= Golden Globe Award for Best Actress – Miniseries or Television Film =

Category of the Golden Globe Awards

Golden Globe Award for Best Actress – Miniseries or Motion Picture Made for Television
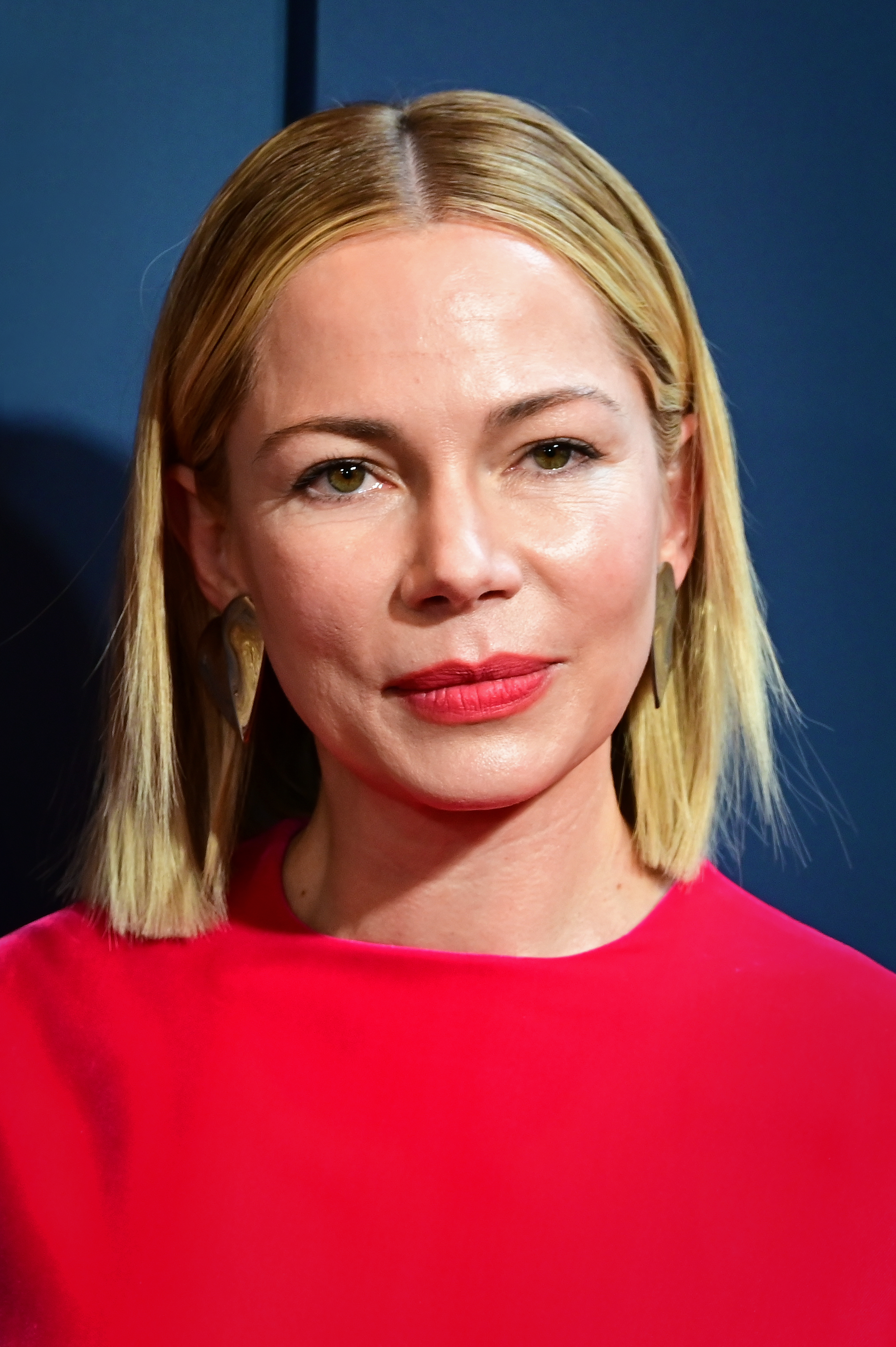
- The 2025 recipient: Michelle Williams
- Awarded for: Best Actress in a Miniseries or Television Film
- Country: United States
- Presented by: Hollywood Foreign Press Association
- First award: January 30, 1982
- Currently held by: Michelle Williams, Dying for Sex (2025)

Highlights
- Most awards: Judy Davis, Ann-Margret, Helen Mirren, Michelle Williams, Kate Winslet (all have 2 each)
- Most nominations: Jessica Lange (8); Helen Mirren (8)
- Website: goldenglobes.org

The Golden Globe Award for Best Actress – Miniseries or Television Film or Best Actress – Miniseries or Motion Picture Made for Television is a Golden Globe Award presented annually by the Hollywood Foreign Press Association (HFPA).

It is given in honor of an actress who has delivered an outstanding performance in a leading role on a miniseries or motion picture made for television for the calendar year. The award was first presented at the 39th Golden Globe Awards on January 30, 1982, to Jane Seymour, for her performance in East of Eden (1981). Performances by actresses in a miniseries or television film were originally awarded in the Best Actress – Television Series Drama category, before the creation of this category.

Since its inception, the award has been given to 34 actresses. Michelle Williams is the current recipient of the award, for her performance in Dying for Sex (2025). Ann-Margret, Judy Davis, Helen Mirren, Michelle Williams, and Kate Winslet have won the most awards in the category, winning two times. Jessica Lange and Mirren have been nominated for the award on eight occasions, the most for the category.

== Winners and nominees ==
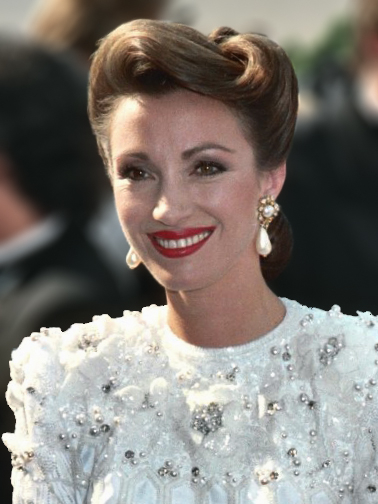
Jane Seymour was the first recipient of the award, for East of Eden (1981)

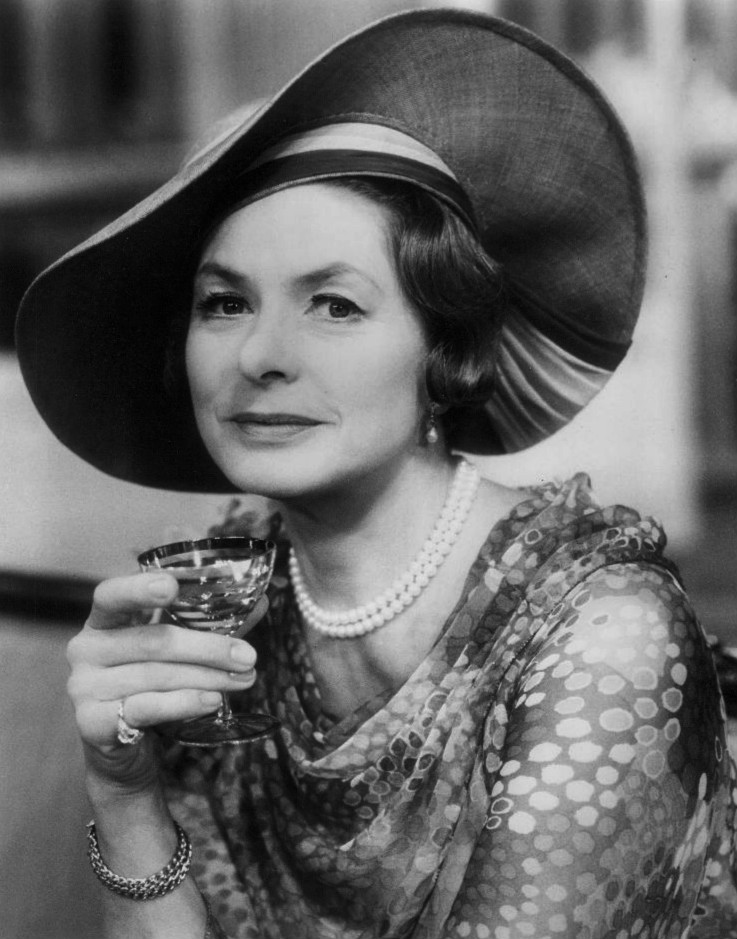
Ingrid Bergman won for A Woman Called Golda (1982).

Ann-Margret won two consecutively for Who Will Love My Children? (1983) and A Streetcar Named Desire (1984)

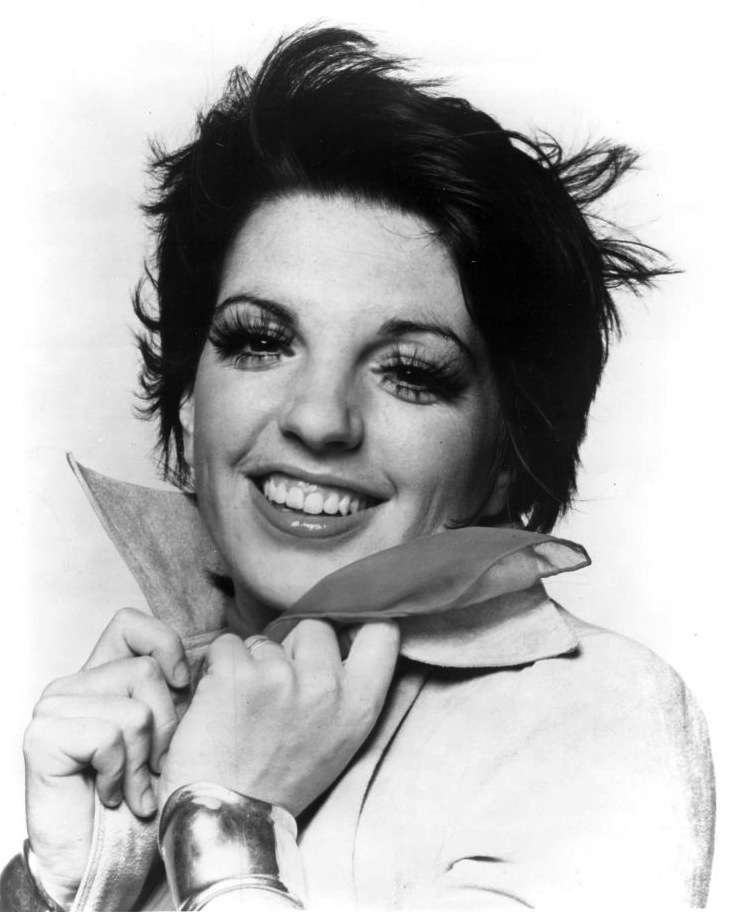
Liza Minnelli won for A Time to Live (1985)

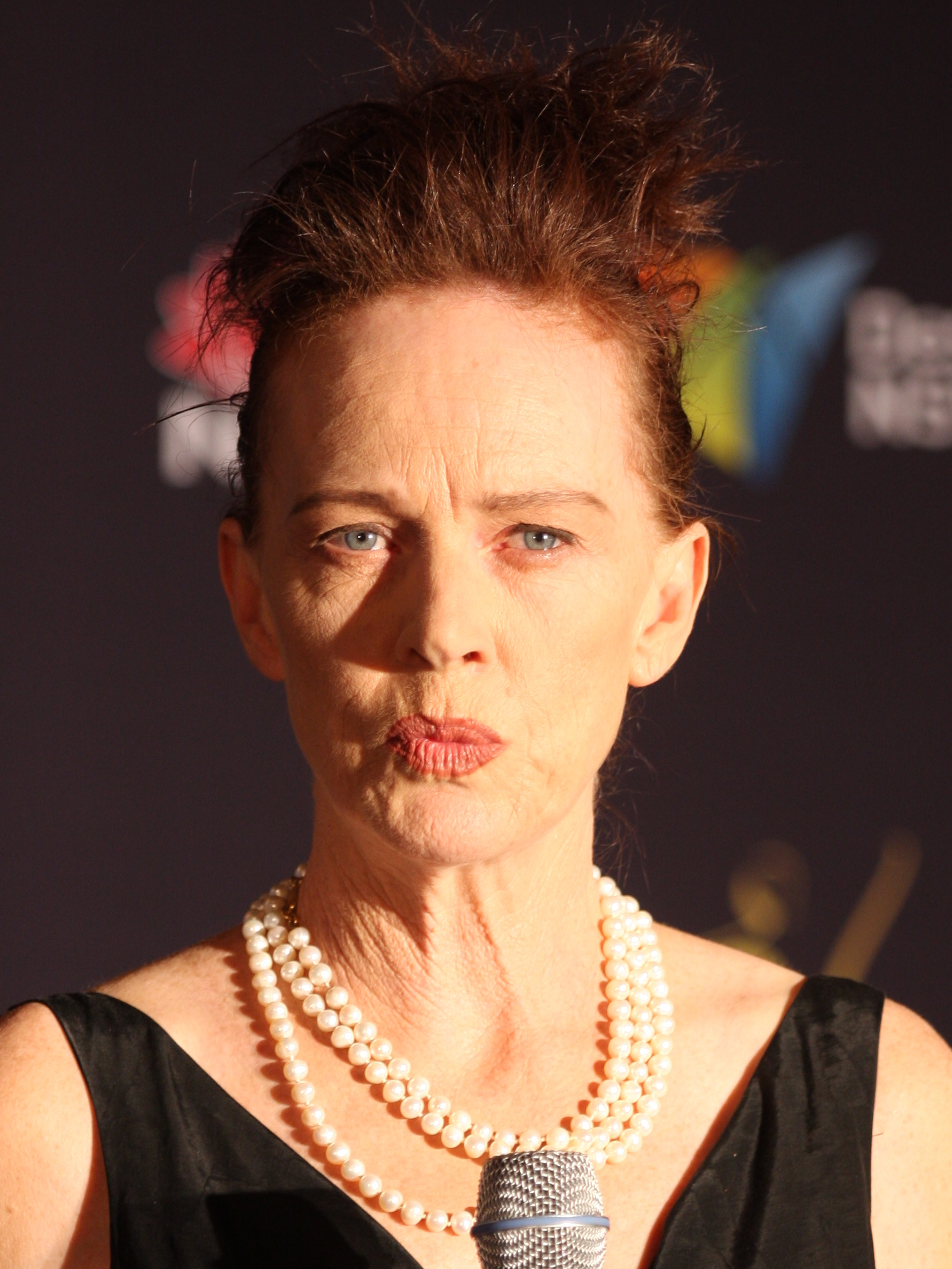
Judy Davis won for One Against the Wind (1991) and Life with Judy Garland: Me and My Shadows (2001).

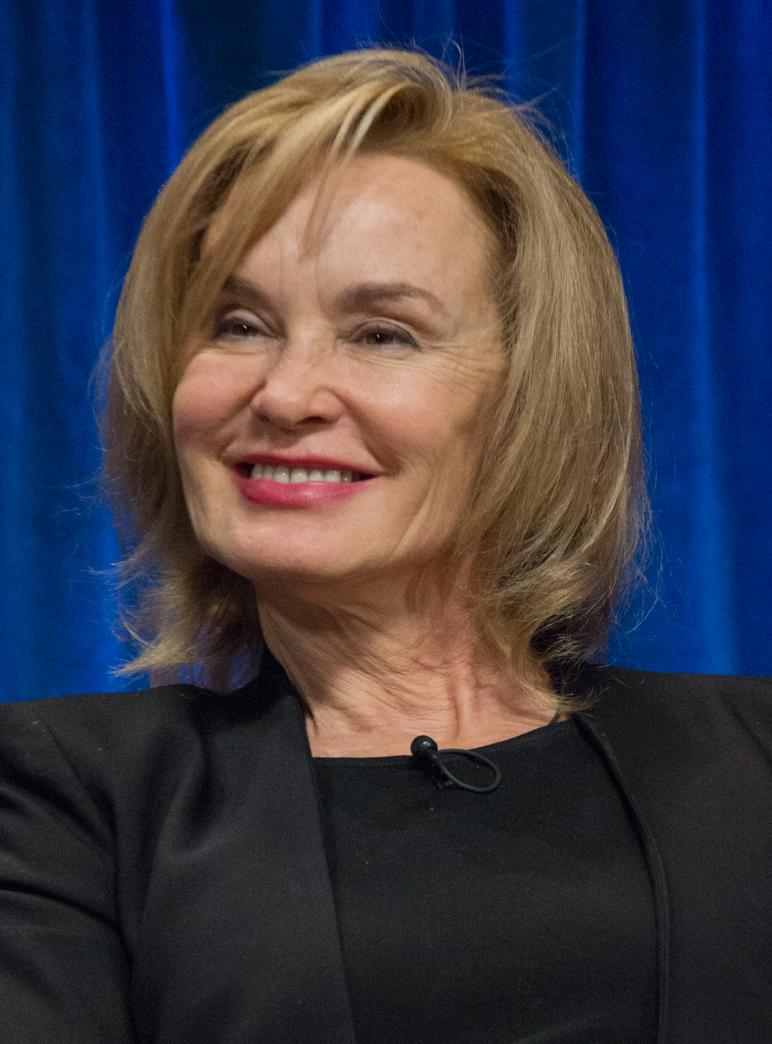
Jessica Lange won for A Streetcar Named Desire (1995).

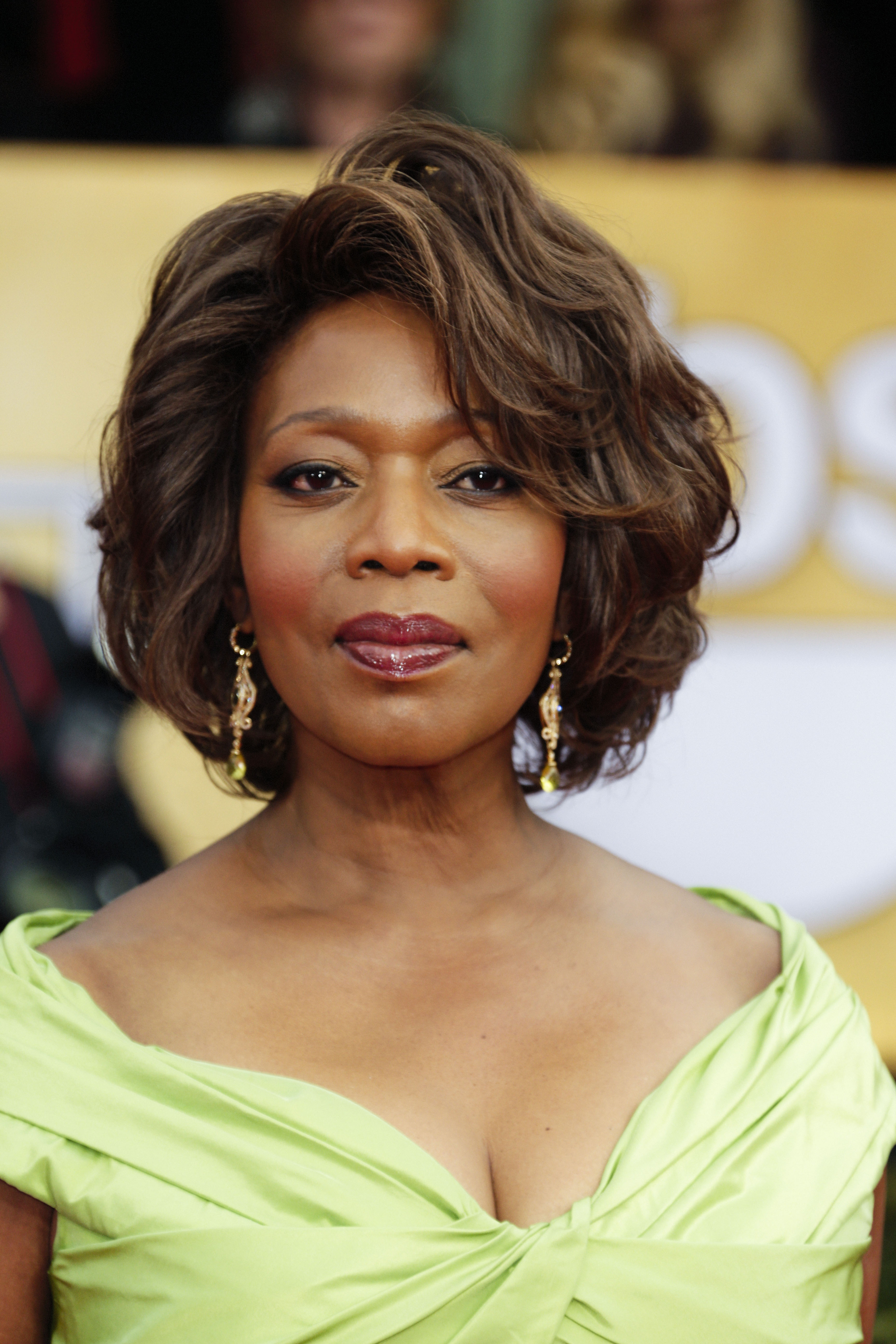
Alfre Woodard won for Miss Evers' Boys (1997)

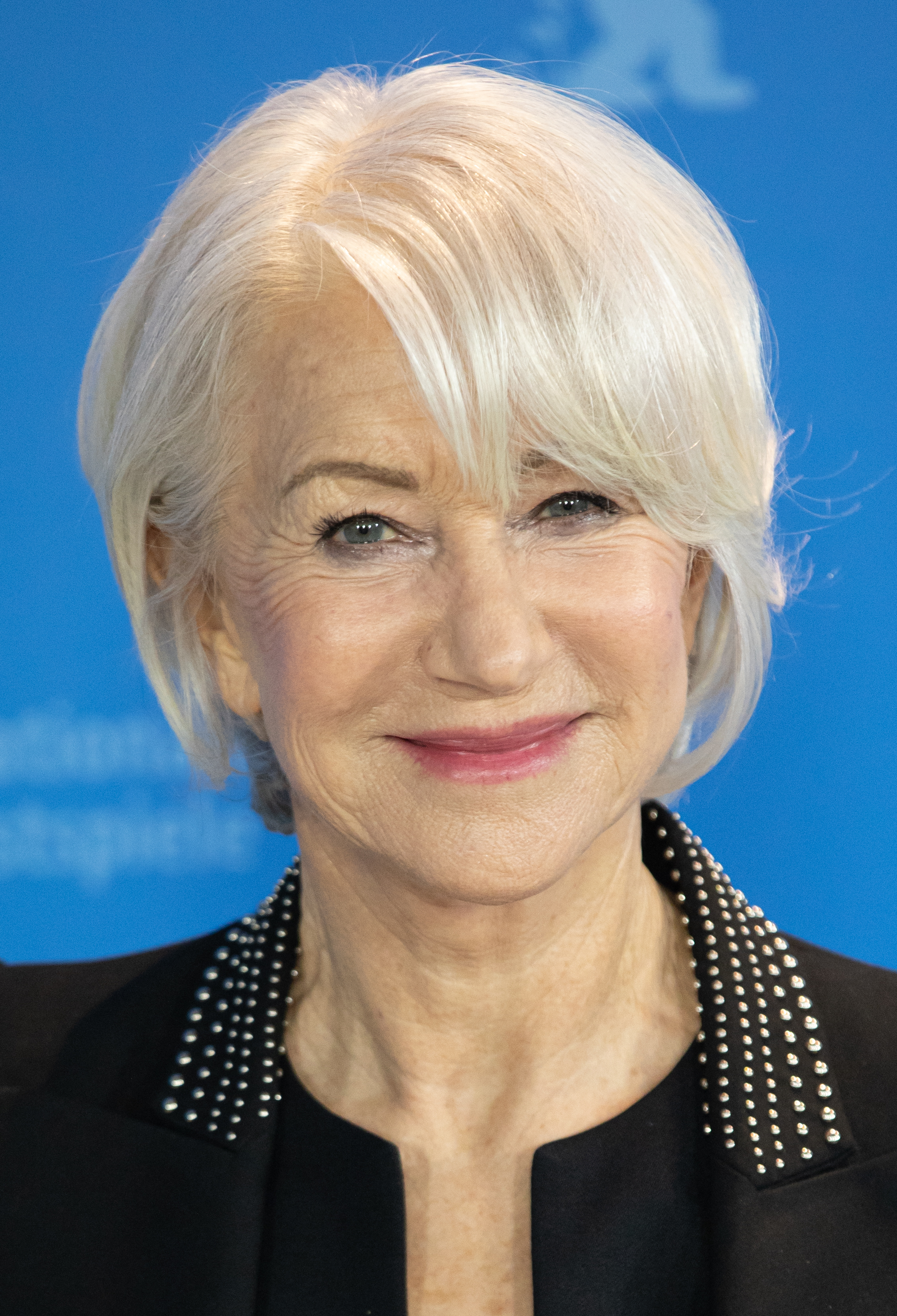
Helen Mirren won twice for Losing Chase (1996) and Elizabeth I (2005).

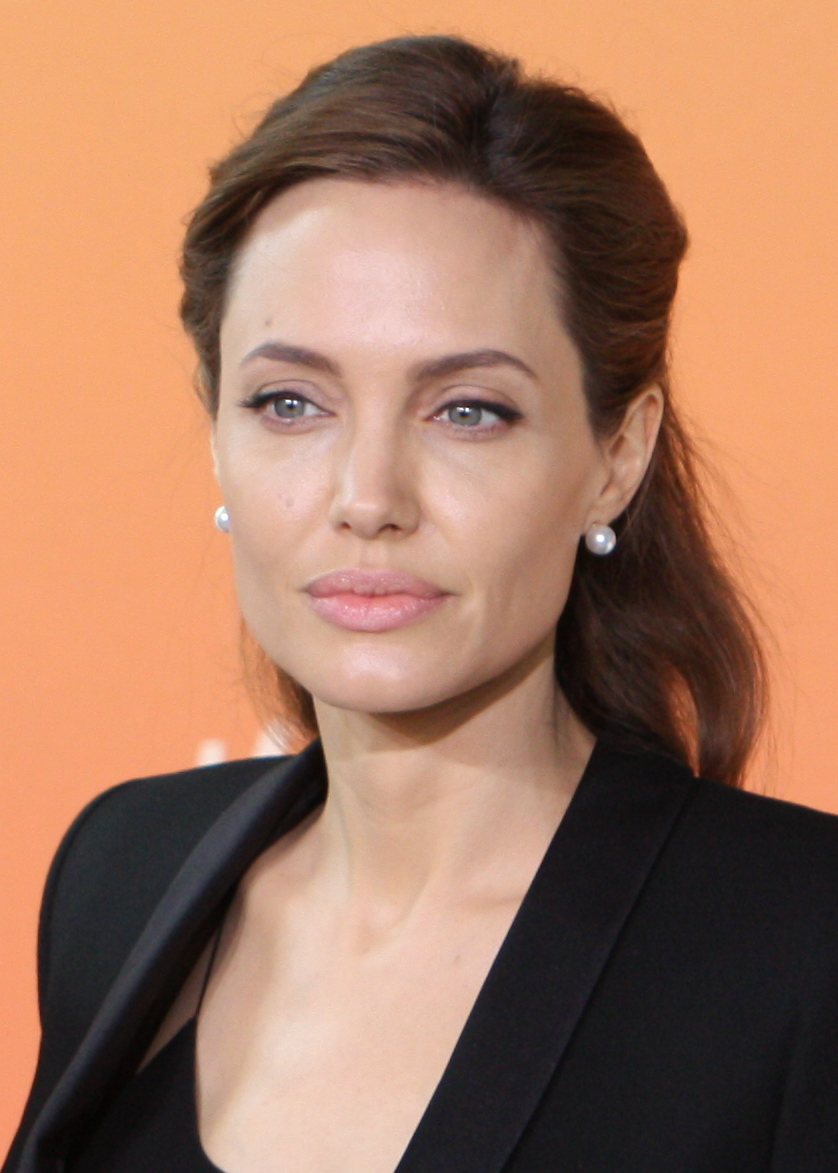
Angelina Jolie won for Gia (1998).

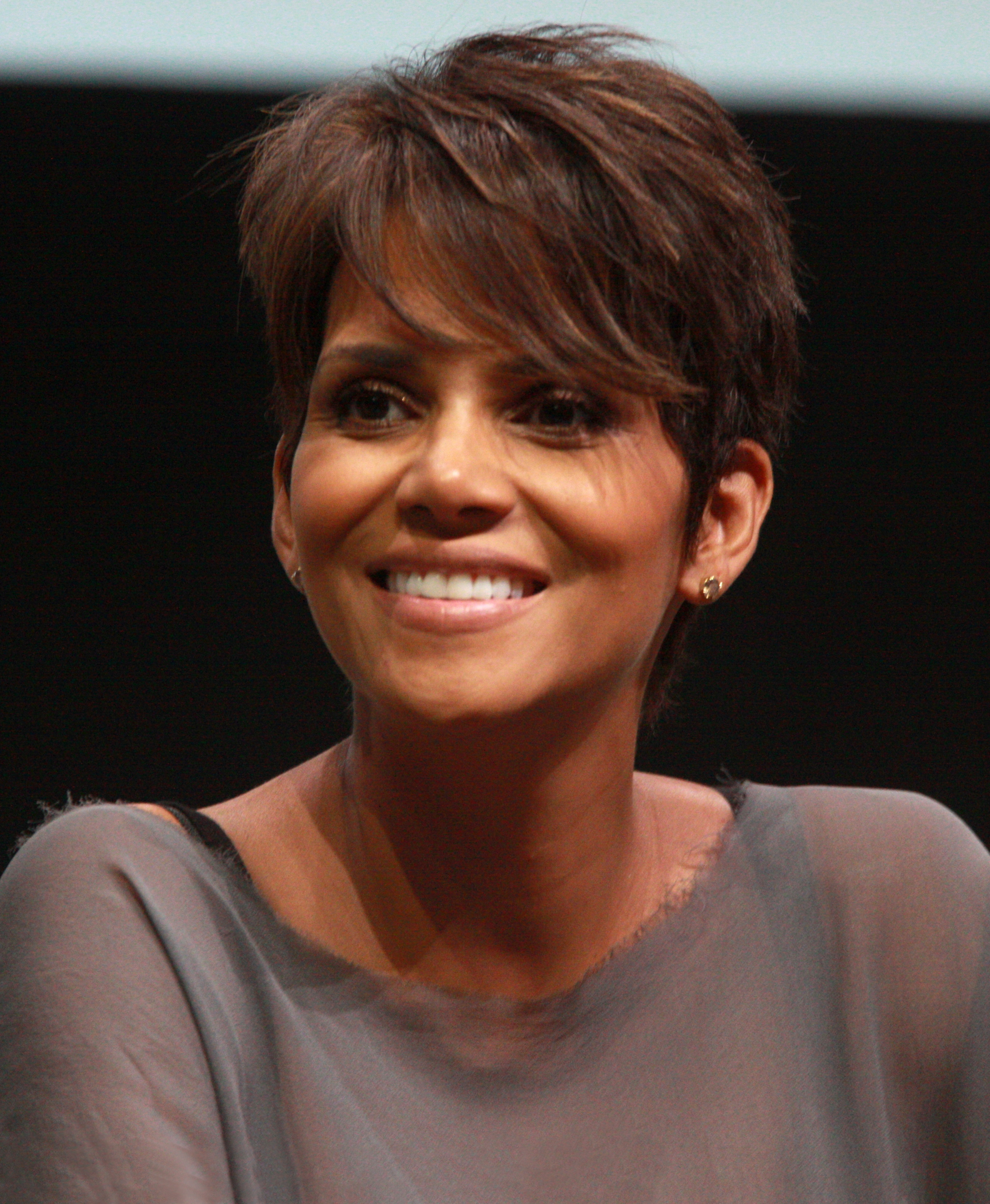
Halle Berry won for Introducing Dorothy Dandridge (1999).

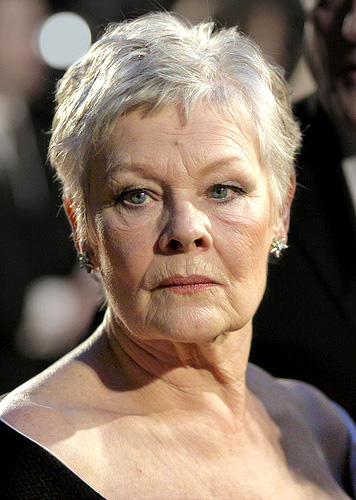
Judi Dench won for The Last of the Blonde Bombshells (2000)

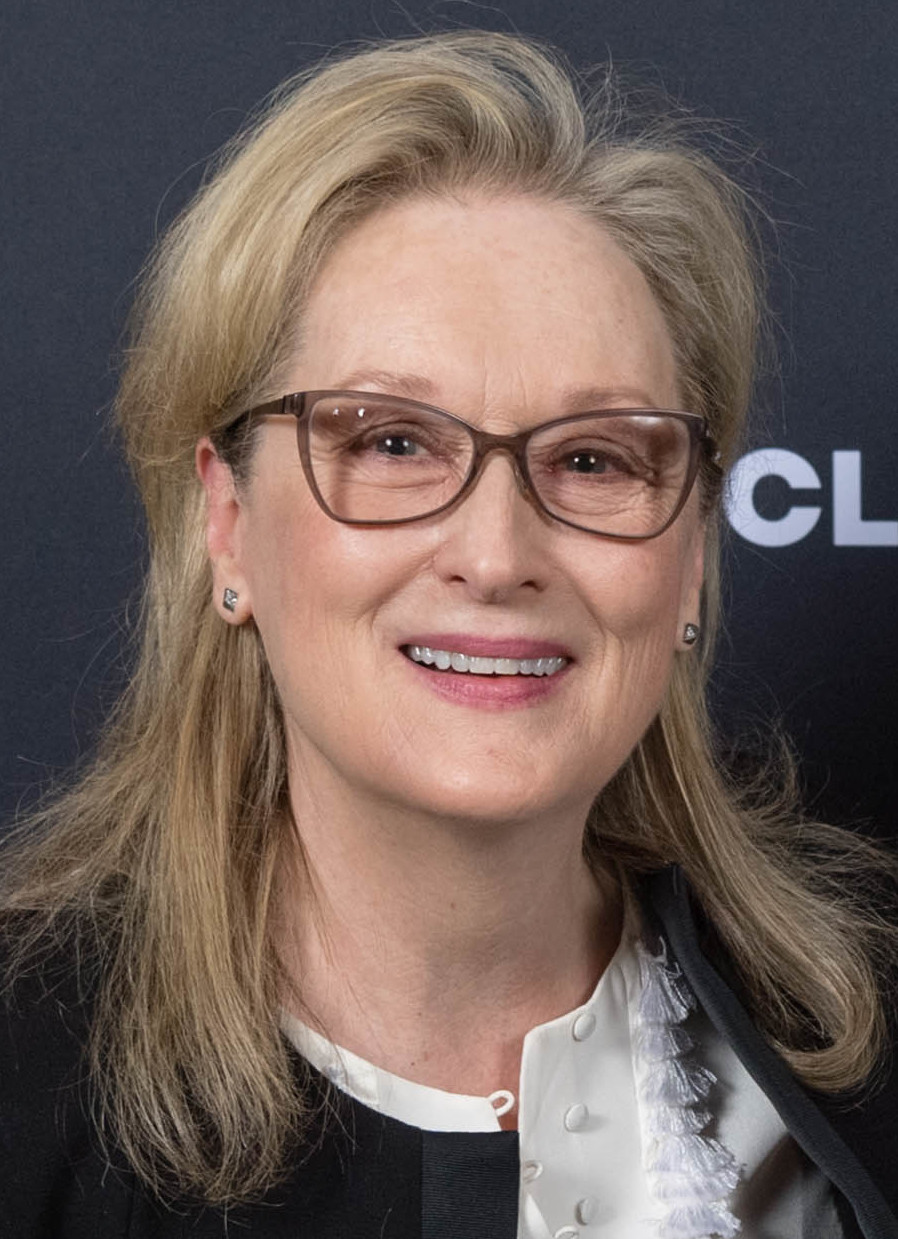
Meryl Streep won for Angels in America (2003).

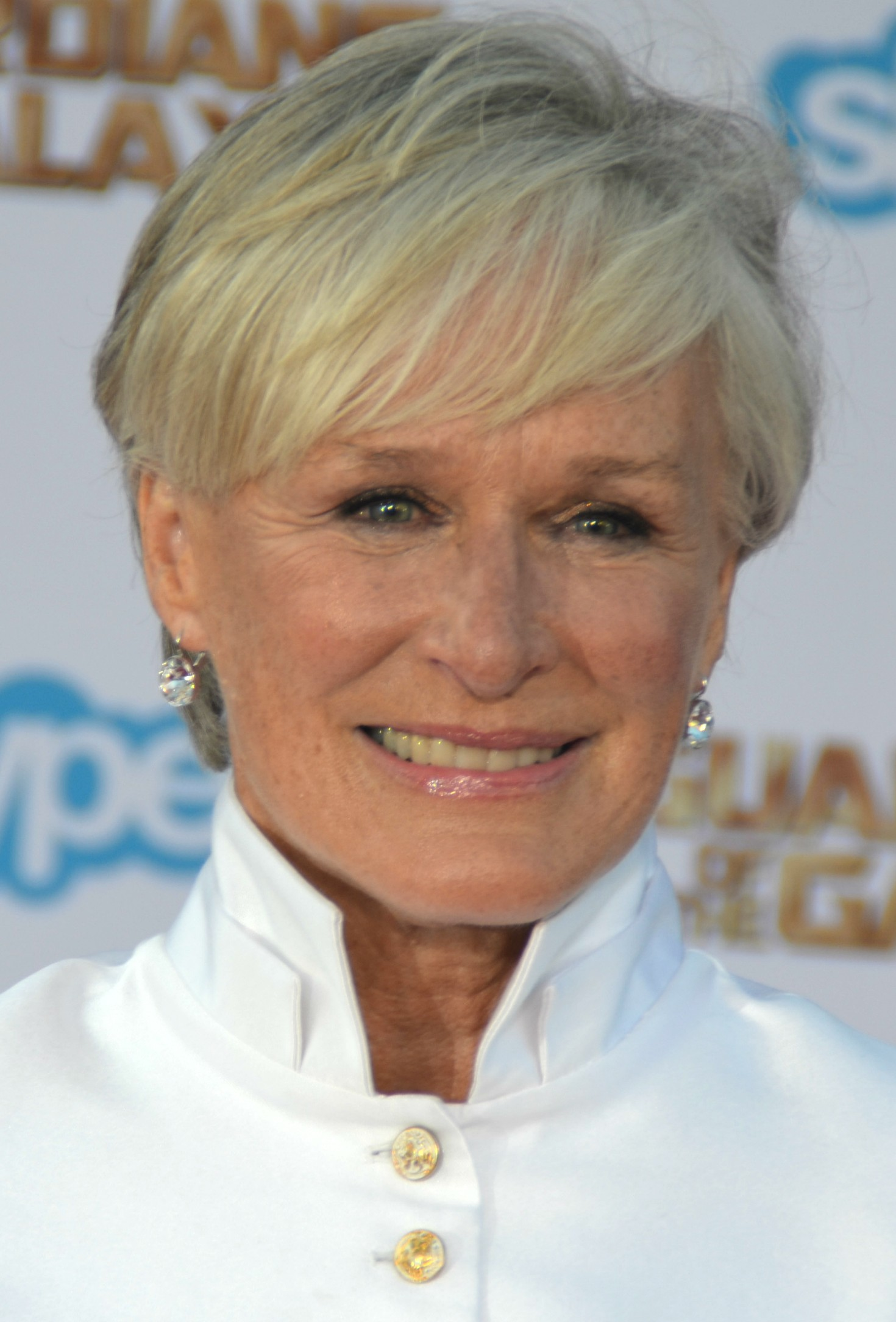
Glenn Close won for The Lion in Winter (2003).

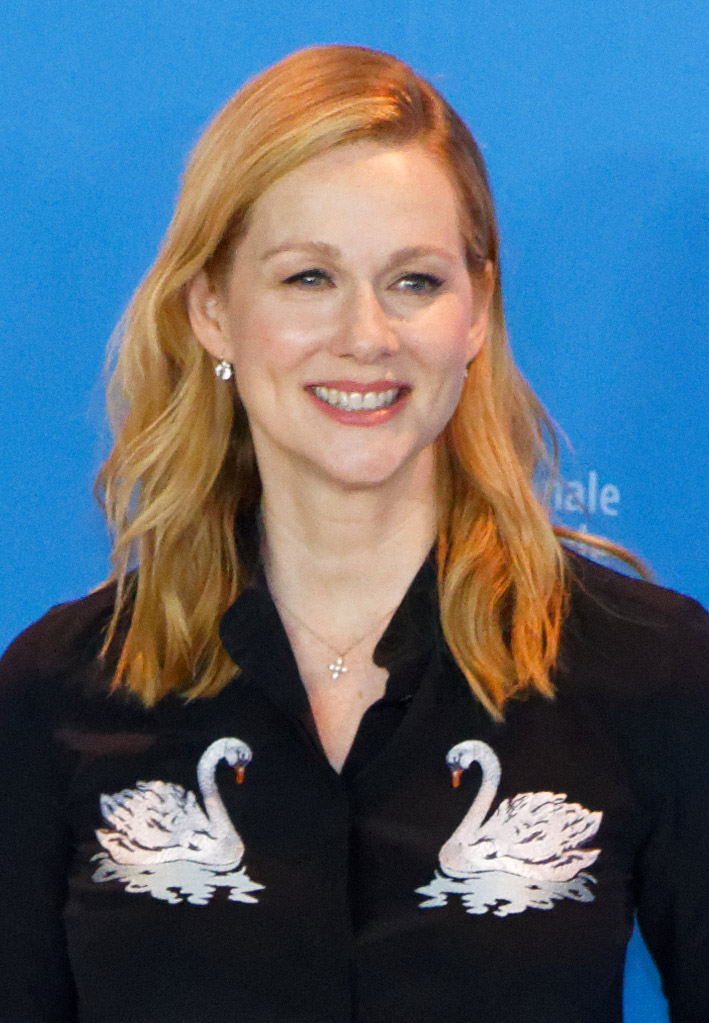
Laura Linney won for John Adams (2008).

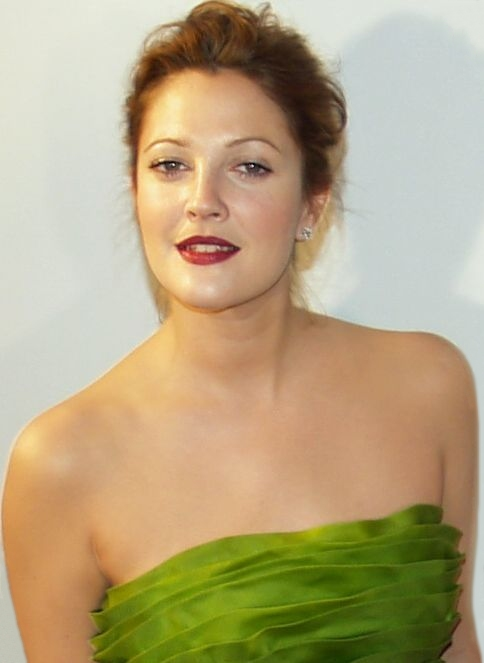
Drew Barrymore won for Grey Gardens (2009)

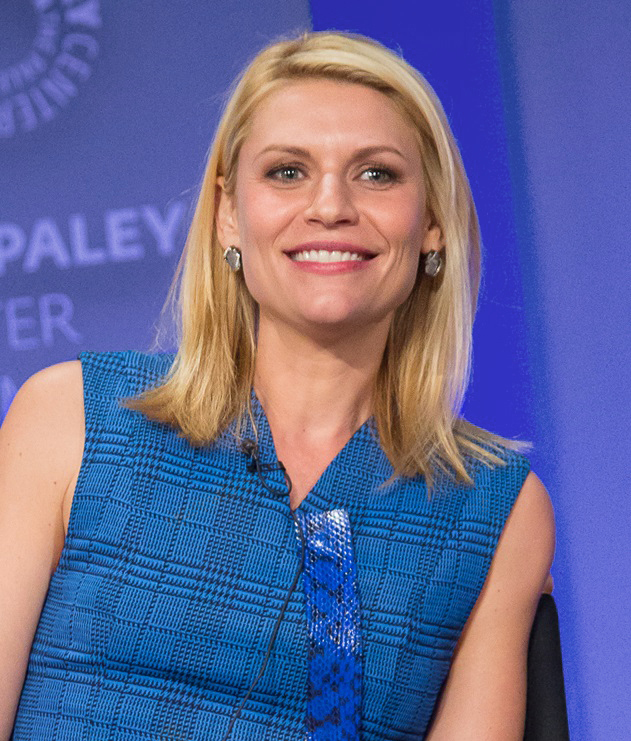
Claire Danes won for Temple Grandin (2010).

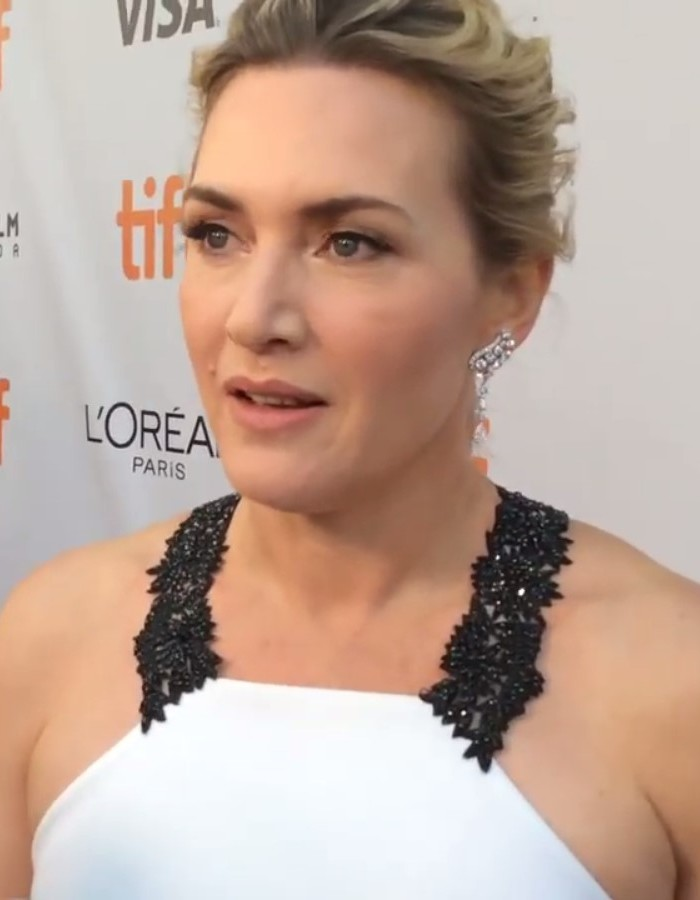
Kate Winslet won twice for Mildred Pierce (2011) and Mare of Easttown (2021).

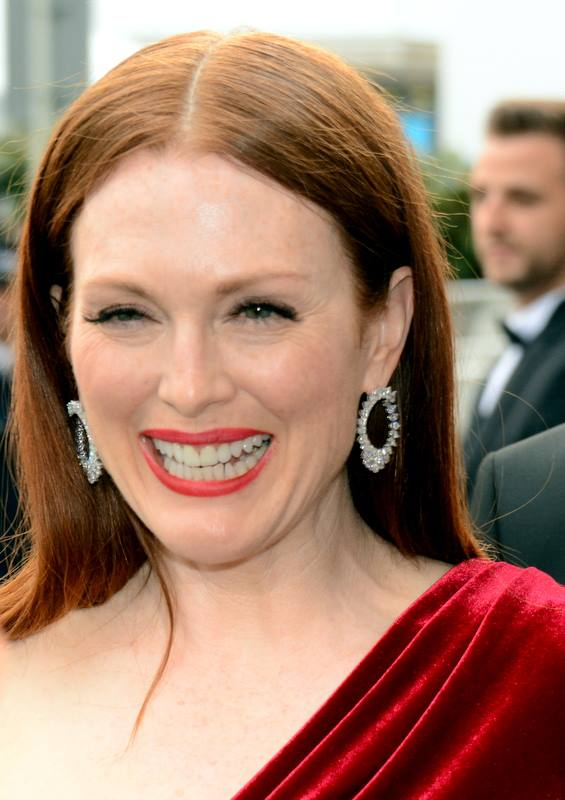
Julianne Moore won for Game Change (2012).

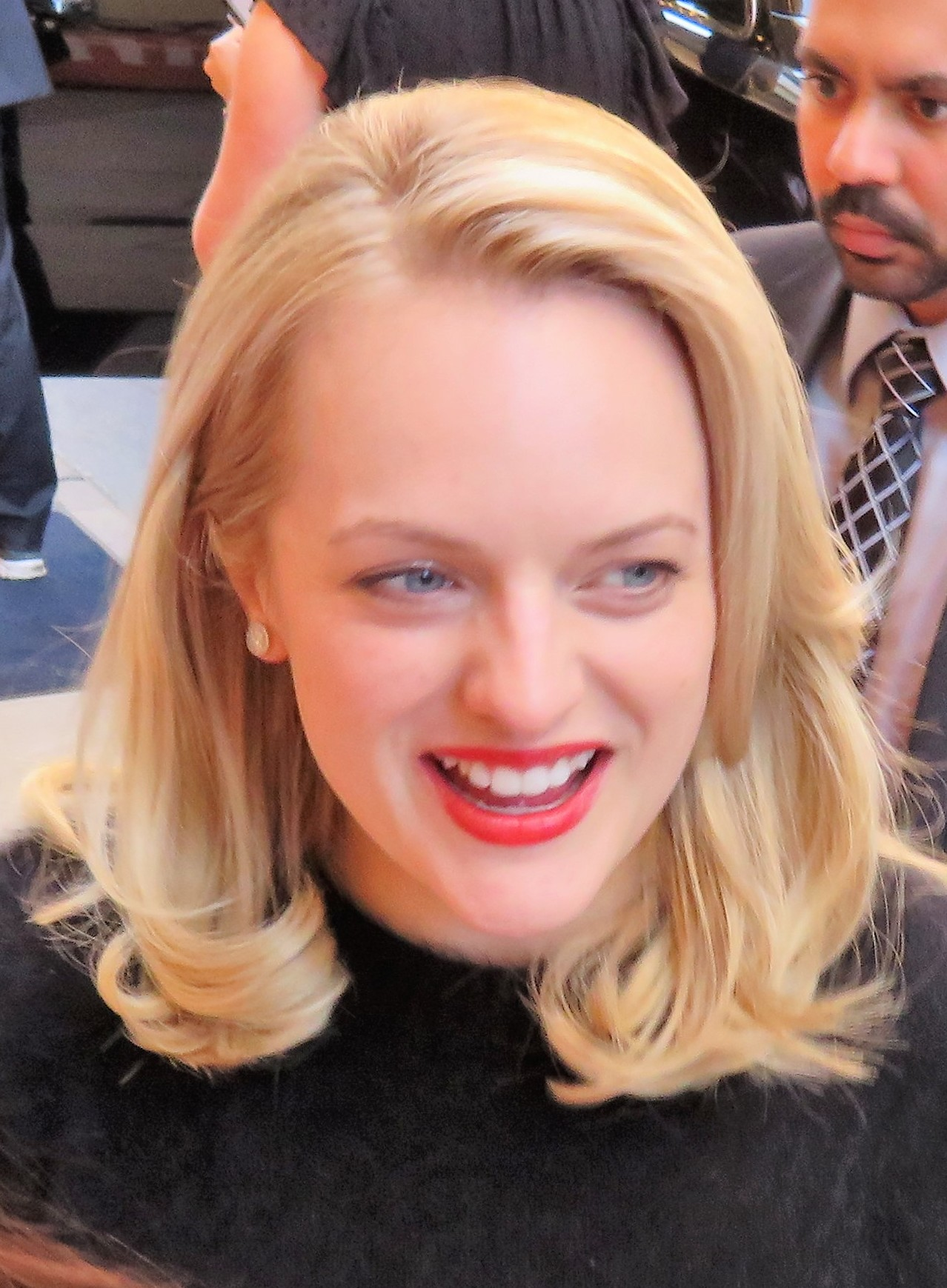
Elisabeth Moss won for Top of the Lake (2013).

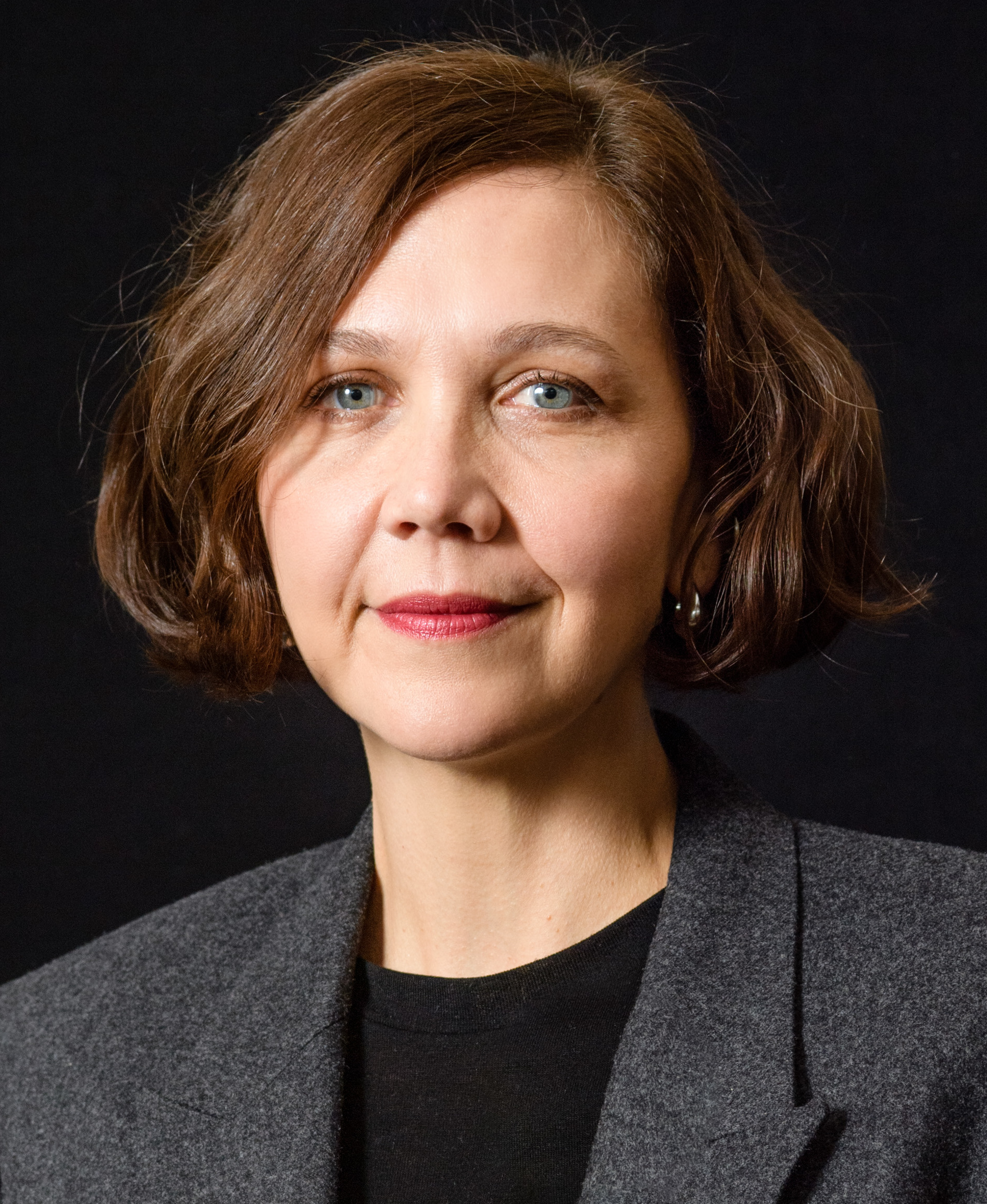
Maggie Gyllenhaal won for The Honourable Woman (2014).

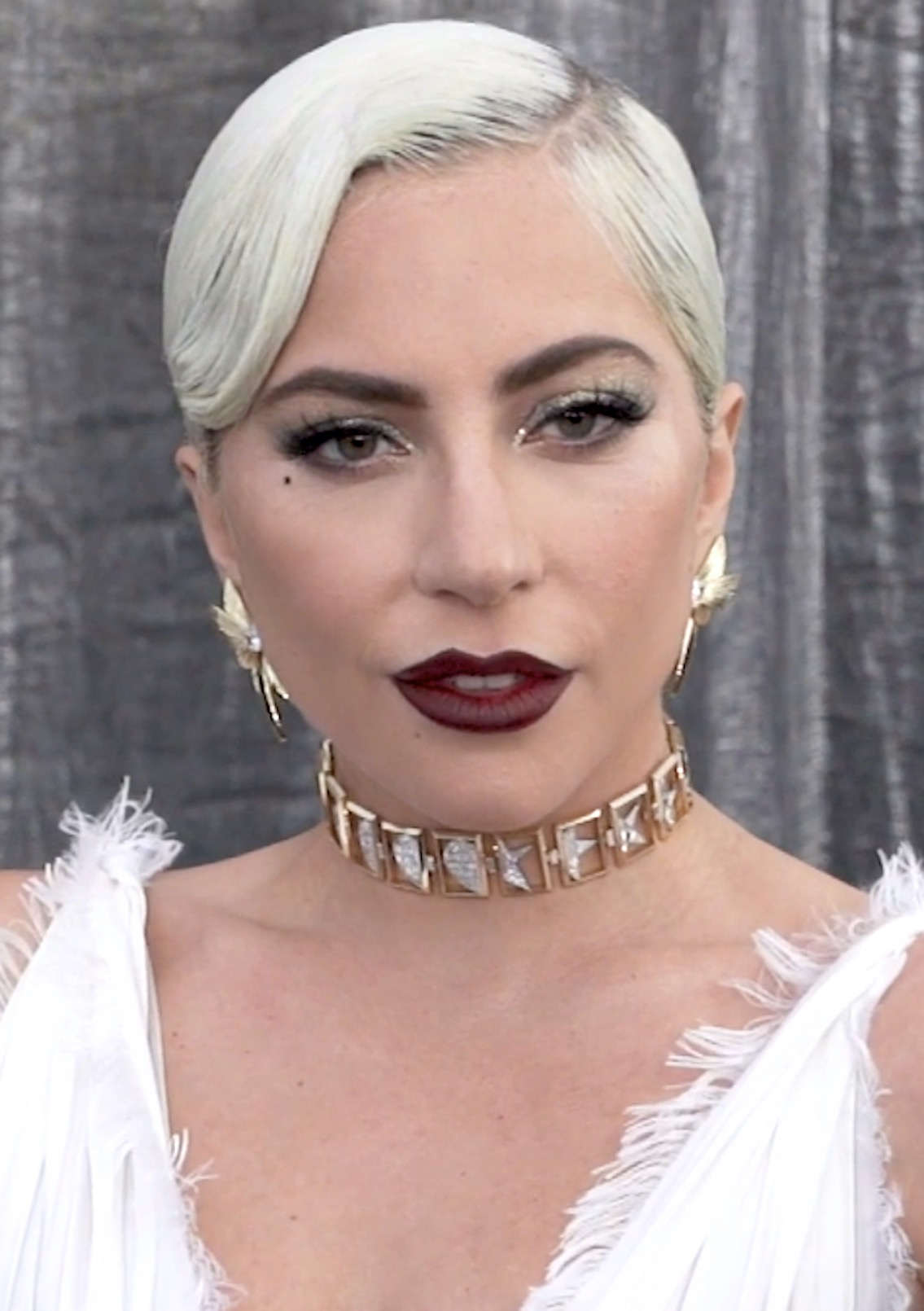
Lady Gaga won for American Horror Story: Hotel (2015–2016).

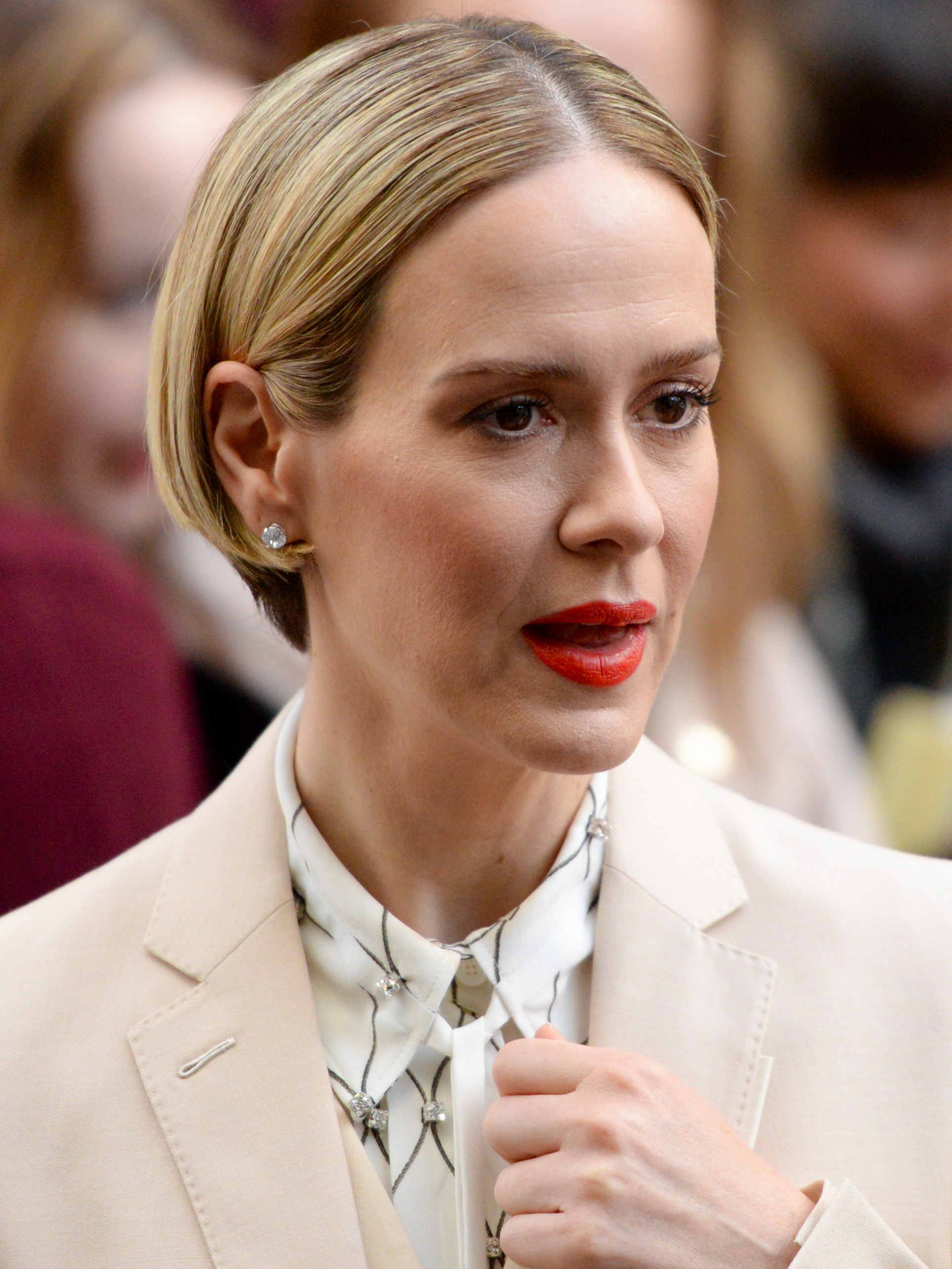
Sarah Paulson won for The People v. O. J. Simpson: American Crime Story (2016).

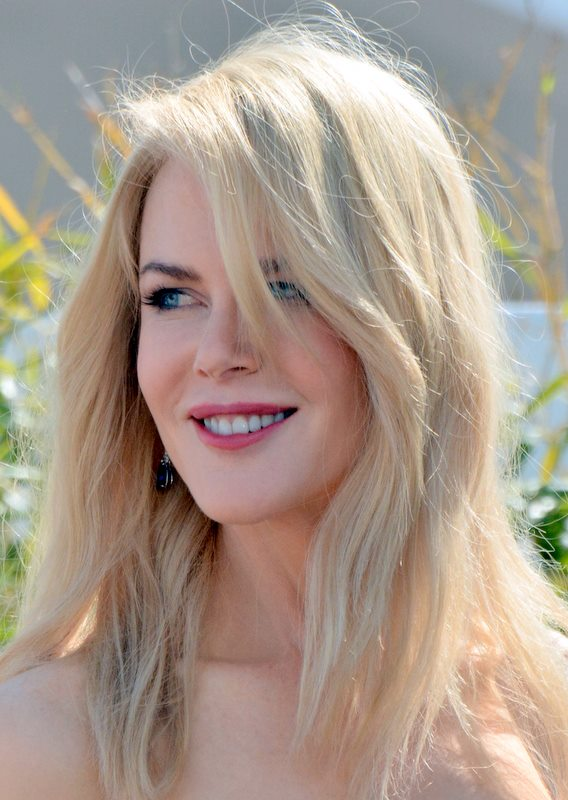
Nicole Kidman won for Big Little Lies (2017).

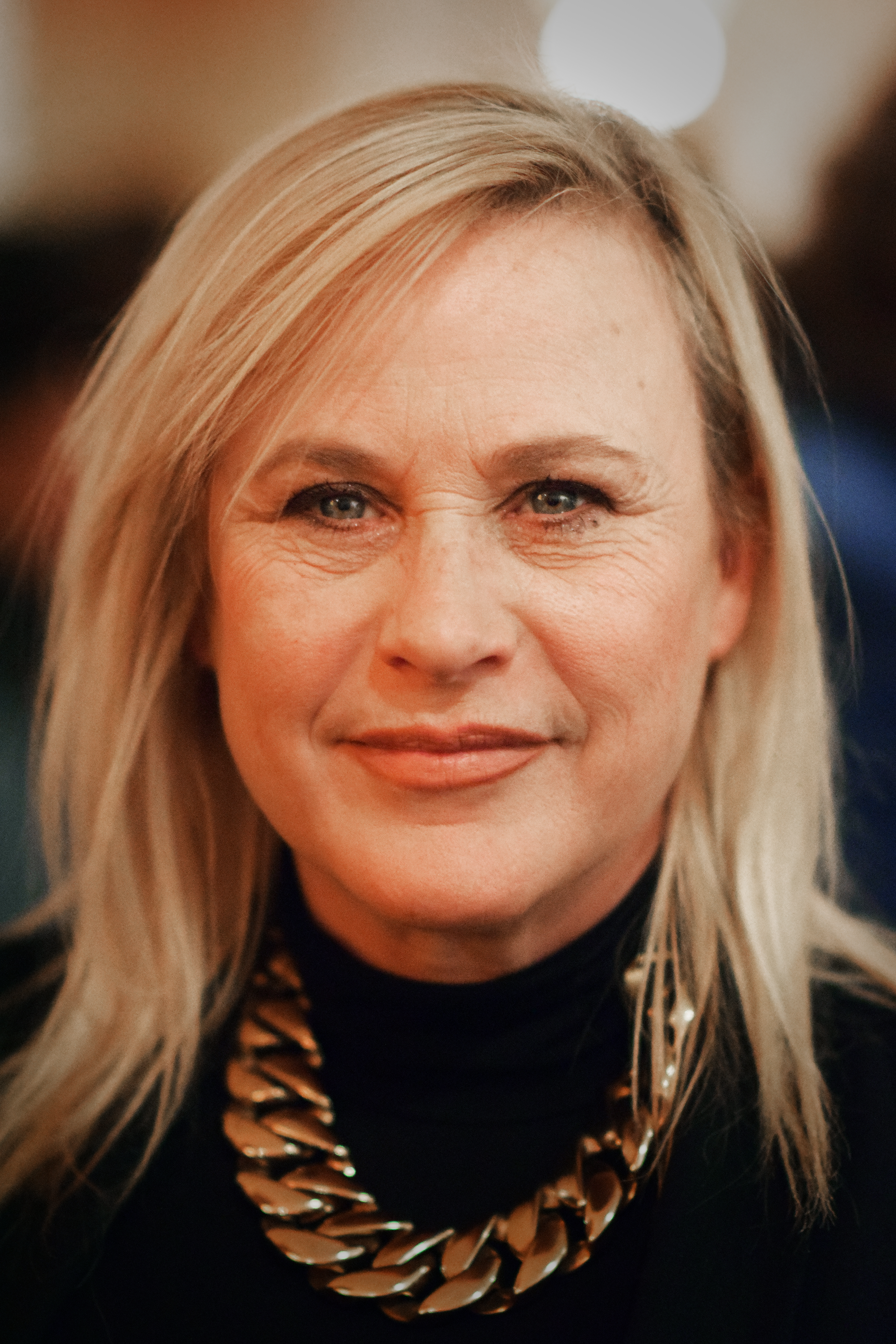
Patricia Arquette won for Escape at Dannemora (2018).

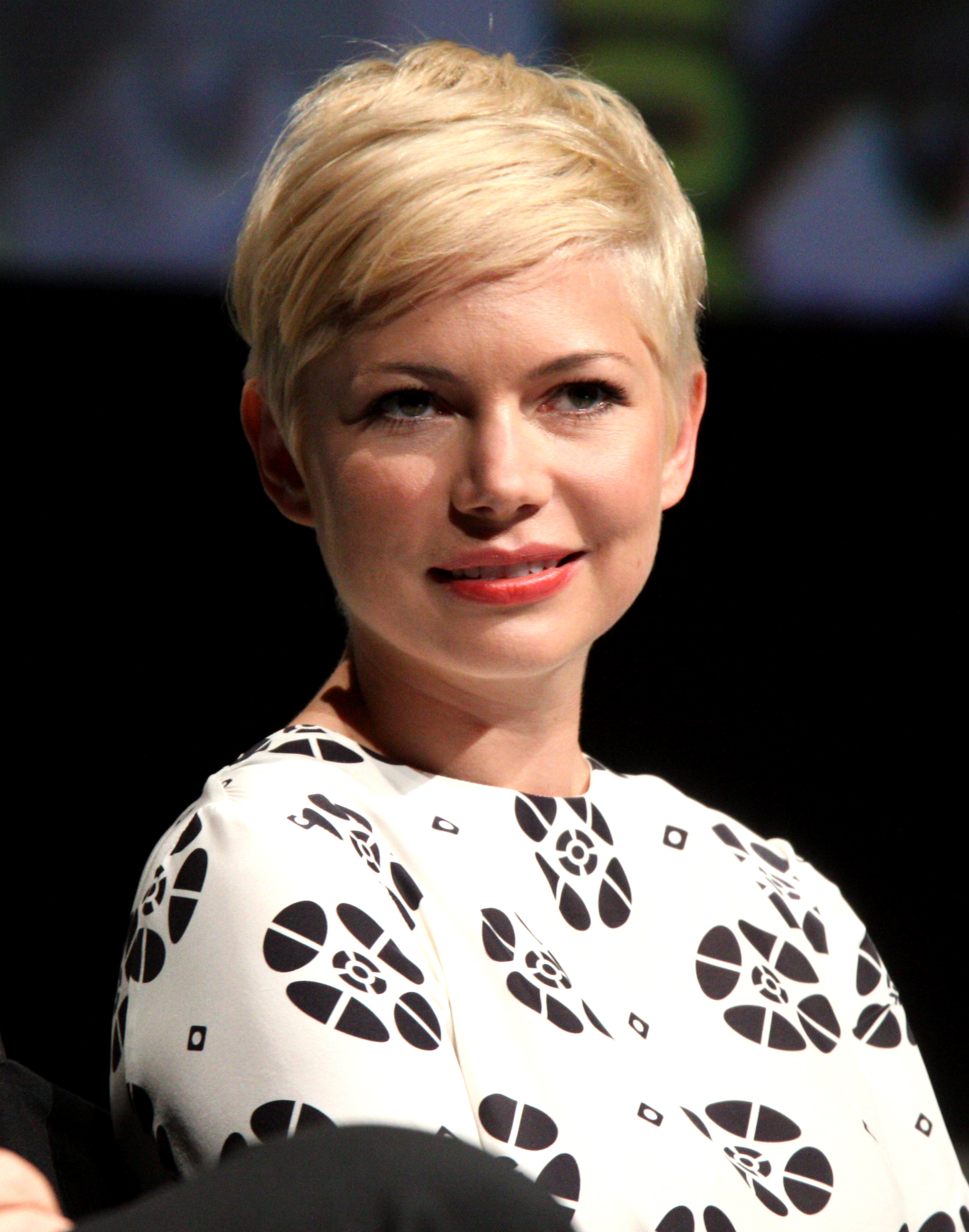
Michelle Williams won twice for Fosse/Verdon (2019) and Dying for Sex (2025)

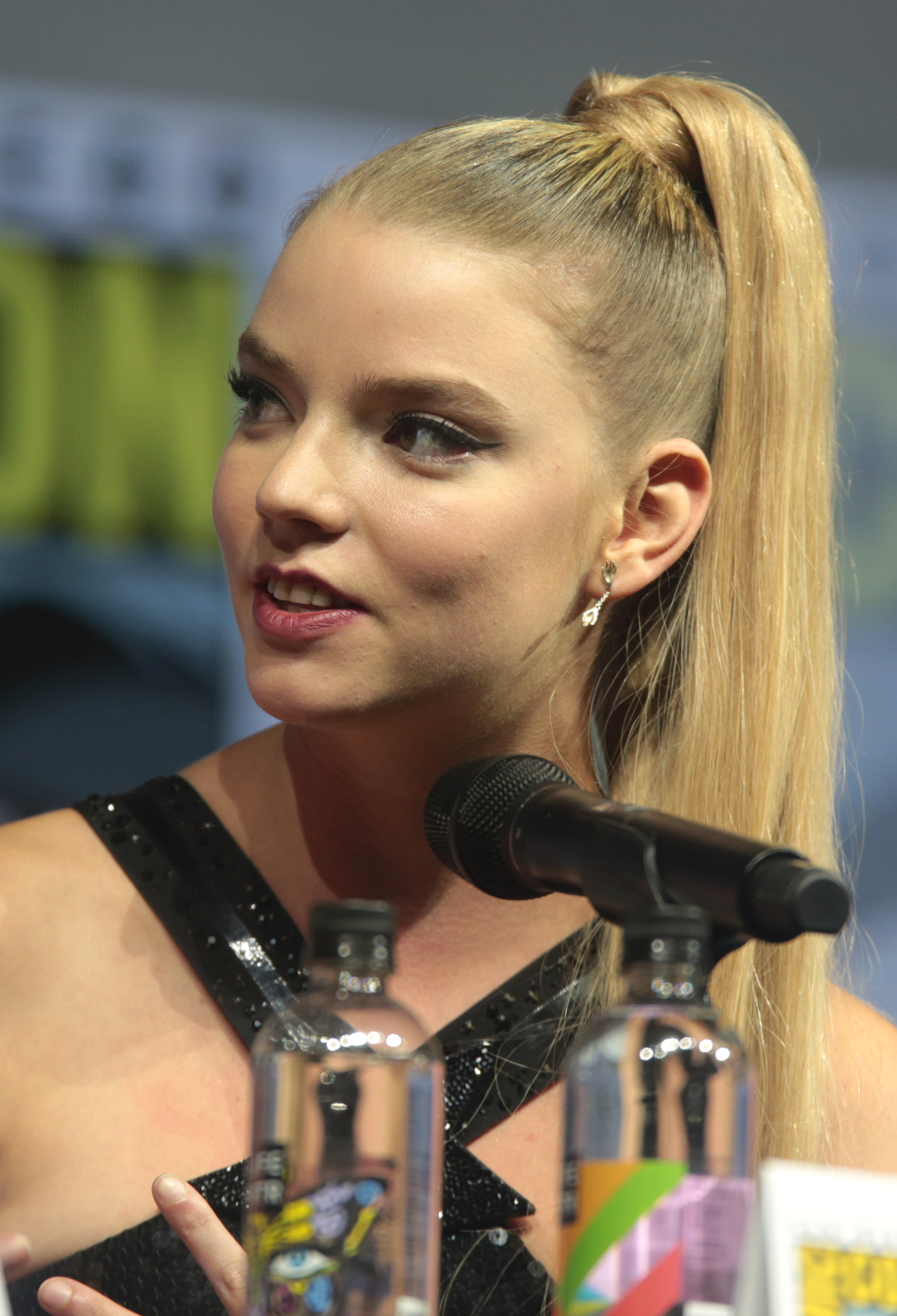
Anya Taylor-Joy won for The Queen's Gambit (2020).

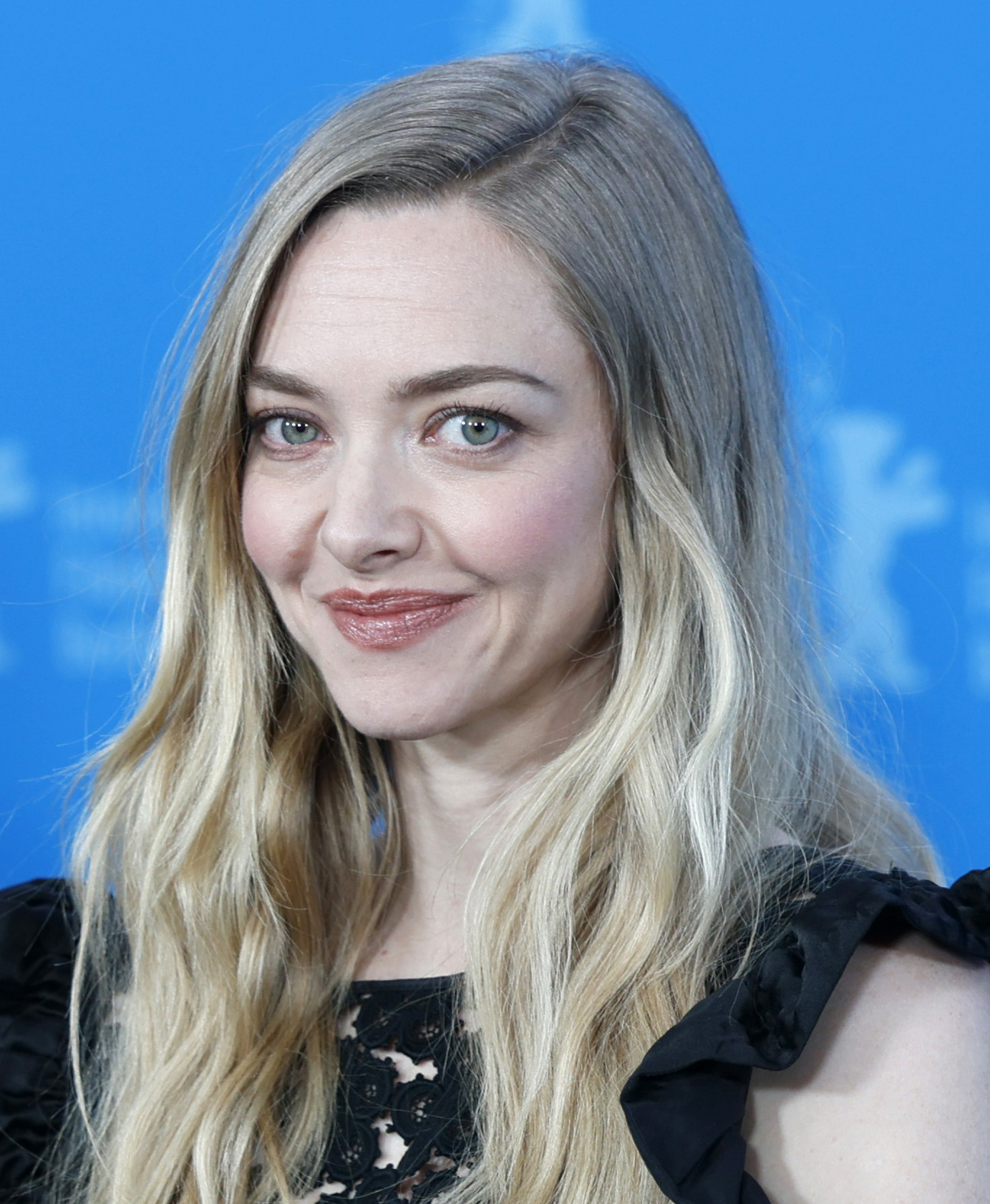
Amanda Seyfried won for The Dropout (2022)

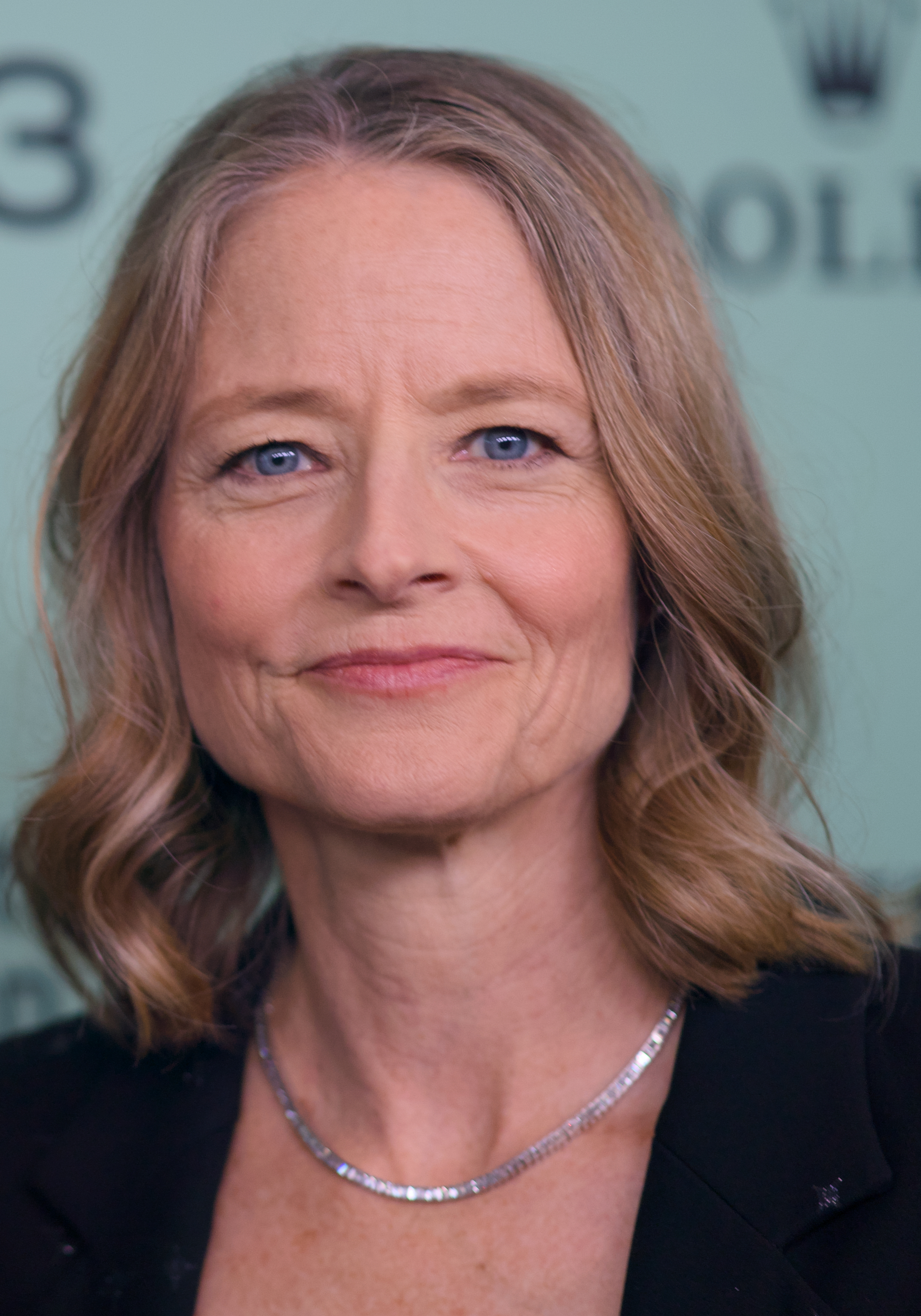
Jodie Foster won for True Detective: Night Country (2024)

Listed below are the winners of the award for each year, as well as the other nominees.

Key	Meaning
‡	Indicates the winning actress

=== 1980s ===
Year	Actor	Role	Program	Network	Ref
1981 (39th)
1981 (39th)	Jane Seymour ‡	Cathy Ames / Kate Albey	East of Eden	ABC	
1981 (39th)	Ellen Burstyn	Jean Harris	The People vs. Jean Harris	NBC	
1981 (39th)	Glenda Jackson	Patricia Neal	The Patricia Neal Story	CBS	
1981 (39th)	Jaclyn Smith	Jacqueline Kennedy Onassis	Jacqueline Bouvier Kennedy	ABC	
1981 (39th)	Joanne Woodward	Elizabeth Huckaby	Crisis at Central High	CBS	
1982 (40th)
1982 (40th)	Ingrid Bergman ‡	Golda Meir	A Woman Called Golda	CBS	
1982 (40th)	Carol Burnett	Beatrice O'Reilly	Life of the Party: The Story of Beatrice	CBS	
1982 (40th)	Lucy Gutteridge	Gloria Morgan Vanderbilt	Little Gloria... Happy at Last	NBC	
1982 (40th)	Ann Jillian	Mae West	Mae West	ABC	
1982 (40th)	Lee Remick	Leslie Crosbie	The Letter	ABC	
1982 (40th)	Jean Stapleton	Eleanor Roosevelt	Eleanor, First Lady of the World	CBS	
1983 (41st)
1983 (41st)	Ann-Margret ‡	Lucile Fray	Who Will Love My Children?	ABC	
1983 (41st)	Susan Blakely	Frances Farmer	Will There Really Be a Morning?	CBS	
1983 (41st)	Blair Brown	Jacqueline Kennedy Onassis	Kennedy	NBC	
1983 (41st)	Gena Rowlands	Victoria Alden	Thursday's Child	CBS	
1983 (41st)	Rachel Ward	Meggie Cleary	The Thorn Birds	ABC	
1984 (42nd)
1984 (42nd)	Ann-Margret ‡	Blanche DuBois	A Streetcar Named Desire	ABC	
1984 (42nd)	Glenn Close	Gail Bennett	Something About Amelia	ABC	
1984 (42nd)	Farrah Fawcett	Francine Hughes	The Burning Bed	NBC	
1984 (42nd)	Jane Fonda	Gertie Nevels	The Dollmaker	ABC	
1984 (42nd)	Glenda Jackson	Yelena Bonner	Sakharov	HBO	
1985 (43rd)
1985 (43rd)	Liza Minnelli ‡	Mary-Lou Weisman	A Time to Live	NBC	
1985 (43rd)	Peggy Ashcroft	Barbara Batchelor	The Jewel in the Crown	PBS	
1985 (43rd)	Gena Rowlands	Katherine Pierson	An Early Frost	NBC	
1985 (43rd)	Marlo Thomas	Tess Lynd	Consenting Adult	ABC	
1985 (43rd)	Joanne Woodward	Barbara Wyatt-Hollis	Do You Remember Love	CBS	
1986 (44th)
1986 (44th)	Loretta Young ‡	Amanda Kingsley	Christmas Eve	NBC	
1986 (44th)	Farrah Fawcett	Beate Klarsfeld	Nazi Hunter: The Beate Klarsfeld Story	ABC	
1986 (44th)	Amy Irving	Anastasia "Anna" Anderson	Anastasia: The Mystery of Anna	NBC	
1986 (44th)	Vanessa Redgrave	Renée Richards	Second Serve	CBS	
1986 (44th)	Marlo Thomas	Marie Balter	Nobody's Child	CBS	
1987 (45th)
1987 (45th)	Gena Rowlands ‡	Betty Ford	The Betty Ford Story	ABC	
1987 (45th)	Ann-Margret	Ann Arden Grenville	The Two Mrs. Grenvilles	NBC	
1987 (45th)	Farrah Fawcett	Barbara Hutton	Poor Little Rich Girl: The Barbara Hutton Story	NBC	
1987 (45th)	Shirley MacLaine	Herself	Out on a Limb	ABC	
1987 (45th)	Raquel Welch	Emily Bauer	Right to Die	NBC	
1988 (46th)
1988 (46th)	Ann Jillian ‡	Herself	The Ann Jillian Story	NBC	
1988 (46th)	Vanessa Redgrave	Alice More	A Man for All Seasons	TNT	
1988 (46th)	Jane Seymour	Natalie Henry	War and Remembrance (Parts I – VII)	ABC	
1988 (46th)	Jane Seymour	Wallis Simpson	The Woman He Loved	CBS	
1988 (46th)	JoBeth Williams	Mary Beth Whitehead	Baby M	ABC	
1989 (47th)
1989 (47th)	Christine Lahti ‡	Zan Cooper	No Place Like Home	CBS	
1989 (47th)	Farrah Fawcett	Diane Downs	Small Sacrifices	ABC	
1989 (47th)	Holly Hunter	Ellen Russell / Jane Doe	Roe vs. Wade	NBC	
1989 (47th)	Jane Seymour	Natalie Henry	War and Remembrance (Parts VIII – XII)	ABC	
1989 (47th)	Loretta Young	Grace Guthrie	Lady in the Corner	NBC	

=== 1990s ===
Year	Actor	Role	Program	Network	Ref
1990 (48th)
1990 (48th)	Barbara Hershey ‡	Candy Morrison	A Killing in a Small Town	CBS	
1990 (48th)	Annette O'Toole	Rose Kennedy	The Kennedys of Massachusetts	ABC	
1990 (48th)	Suzanne Pleshette	Leona Helmsley	Leona Helmsley: The Queen of Mean	CBS	
1990 (48th)	Lesley Ann Warren	Barbara Walker	Family of Spies	CBS	
1990 (48th)	Stephanie Zimbalist	Caroline	Caroline?	CBS	
1991 (49th)
1991 (49th)	Judy Davis ‡	Mary Lindell	One Against the Wind	CBS	
1991 (49th)	Glenn Close	Sarah Whedon	Sarah, Plain and Tall	CBS	
1991 (49th)	Sally Kirkland	Janet Smurl	The Haunted	Fox	
1991 (49th)	Jessica Tandy	Grace	The Story Lady	NBC	
1991 (49th)	Lynn Whitfield	Josephine Baker	The Josephine Baker Story	HBO	
1992 (50th)
1992 (50th)	Laura Dern ‡	Janet Harduvel	Afterburn	HBO	
1992 (50th)	Drew Barrymore	Anita Minteer	Guncrazy	Showtime	
1992 (50th)	Katharine Hepburn	Victoria Brown	The Man Upstairs	CBS	
1992 (50th)	Jessica Lange	Alexandra Bergson	O Pioneers!	CBS	
1992 (50th)	Kyra Sedgwick	Reyzel Weiss / Rose White	Miss Rose White	NBC	
1993 (51st)
1993 (51st)	Bette Midler ‡	Rose Hovick	Gypsy	HBO	
1993 (51st)	Helena Bonham Carter	Marina Oswald Porter	Fatal Deception: Mrs. Lee Harvey Oswald	NBC	
1993 (51st)	Faye Dunaway	Lauren Staton	Columbo	ABC	
1993 (51st)	Holly Hunter	Wanda Holloway	The Positively True Adventures of the Alleged Texas Cheerleader-Murdering Mom	HBO	
1993 (51st)	Anjelica Huston	Lainey Eberlin	Family Pictures	ABC	
1994 (52nd)
1994 (52nd)	Joanne Woodward ‡	Maggie Moran	Breathing Lessons	CBS	
1994 (52nd)	Kirstie Alley	Sally Goodson	David's Mother	CBS	
1994 (52nd)	Irene Bedard	Mary Crow Dog	Lakota Woman: Siege at Wounded Knee	TNT	
1994 (52nd)	Diane Keaton	Amelia Earhart	Amelia Earhart: The Final Flight	TNT	
1994 (52nd)	Diana Ross	Pauline "Paulie" Cooper	Out of Darkness	ABC	
1995 (53rd)
1995 (53rd)	Jessica Lange ‡	Blanche DuBois	A Streetcar Named Desire	CBS	
1995 (53rd)	Glenn Close	Margarethe Cammermeyer	Serving in Silence: The Margarethe Cammermeyer Story	NBC	
1995 (53rd)	Jamie Lee Curtis	Heidi Holland	The Heidi Chronicles	TNT	
1995 (53rd)	Sally Field	Bess Garner Steed	A Woman of Independent Means	NBC	
1995 (53rd)	Linda Hamilton	Rosemary Holmstrom	A Mother's Prayer	USA	
1996 (54th)
1996 (54th)	Helen Mirren ‡	Chase Phillips	Losing Chase	Showtime	
1996 (54th)	Ashley Judd	Norma Jean Dougherty	Norma Jean & Marilyn	HBO	
1996 (54th)	Demi Moore	Claire Donnelly	If These Walls Could Talk	HBO	
1996 (54th)	Isabella Rossellini	Anna Hauptmann	Crime of the Century	HBO	
1996 (54th)	Mira Sorvino	Marilyn Monroe	Norma Jean & Marilyn	HBO	
1997 (55th)
1997 (55th)	Alfre Woodard ‡	Eunice Evers	Miss Evers' Boys	HBO	
1997 (55th)	Ellen Barkin	Glory Marie Jackson	Before Women Had Wings	ABC	
1997 (55th)	Jena Malone	Lily Kate Burns	Hope	TNT	
1997 (55th)	Vanessa Redgrave	Graziella Luciano	Bella Mafia	CBS	
1997 (55th)	Meryl Streep	Lori Reimuller	...First Do No Harm	ABC	
1998 (56th)
1998 (56th)	Angelina Jolie ‡	Gia Carangi	Gia	HBO	
1998 (56th)	Stockard Channing	Rachel Luchman	The Baby Dance	Showtime	
1998 (56th)	Laura Dern	Wanda LeFauve	The Baby Dance	Showtime	
1998 (56th)	Ann-Margret	Pamela Harriman	Life of the Party: The Pamela Harriman Story	Lifetime	
1998 (56th)	Miranda Richardson	Queen Mab	Merlin	NBC	
1999 (57th)
1999 (57th)	Halle Berry ‡	Dorothy Dandridge	Introducing Dorothy Dandridge	HBO	
1999 (57th)	Judy Davis	Lillian Hellman	Dash and Lilly	A&E	
1999 (57th)	Mia Farrow	Diana McGowin	Forget Me Never	CBS	
1999 (57th)	Helen Mirren	Ayn Rand	The Passion of Ayn Rand	Showtime	
1999 (57th)	Leelee Sobieski	Joan of Arc	Joan of Arc	CBS	

=== 2000s ===
Year	Actor	Role	Program	Network	Ref
2000 (58th)
2000 (58th)	Judi Dench ‡	Elizabeth Harman	The Last of the Blonde Bombshells	HBO	
2000 (58th)	Holly Hunter	Ruby Kincaid	Harlan County War	Showtime	
2000 (58th)	Christine Lahti	Lyssa Dent Hughes	An American Daughter	Lifetime	
2000 (58th)	Frances O'Connor	Emma Bovary	Madame Bovary	PBS	
2000 (58th)	Rachel Ward	Moira Davidson	On the Beach	Showtime	
2000 (58th)	Alfre Woodard	Wanda Dean	Holiday Heart	Showtime	
2001 (59th)
2001 (59th)	Judy Davis ‡	Judy Garland	Life with Judy Garland: Me and My Shadows	ABC	
2001 (59th)	Bridget Fonda	Linda Sinclair	After Amy	Lifetime	
2001 (59th)	Julianna Margulies	Morgaine	The Mists of Avalon	TNT	
2001 (59th)	Leelee Sobieski	Tosia Altman	Uprising	NBC	
2001 (59th)	Hannah Taylor-Gordon	Anne Frank	Anne Frank: The Whole Story	ABC	
2001 (59th)	Emma Thompson	Vivian Bearing	Wit	HBO	
2002 (60th)
2002 (60th)	Uma Thurman ‡	Debby Miller	Hysterical Blindness	HBO	
2002 (60th)	Helena Bonham Carter	Ingrid Formanek	Live from Baghdad	HBO	
2002 (60th)	Shirley MacLaine	Mary Kay Ash	Hell on Heels: The Battle of Mary Kay	CBS	
2002 (60th)	Helen Mirren	Mrs. Porter	Door to Door	HBO	
2002 (60th)	Vanessa Redgrave	Clementine Churchill	The Gathering Storm	HBO	
2003 (61st)
2003 (61st)	Meryl Streep ‡	Hannah Pitt / Ethel Rosenberg / The Rabbi / The Angel Australia	Angels in America	HBO	
2003 (61st)	Judy Davis	Nancy Reagan	The Reagans	Showtime	
2003 (61st)	Jessica Lange	Irma Applewood	Normal	HBO	
2003 (61st)	Helen Mirren	Karen Stone	The Roman Spring of Mrs. Stone	Showtime	
2003 (61st)	Maggie Smith	Emily Delahunty	My House in Umbria	HBO	
2004 (62nd)
2004 (62nd)	Glenn Close ‡	Queen Eleanor	The Lion in Winter	Showtime	
2004 (62nd)	Blythe Danner	Rebecca Holmes Davitch	Back When We Were Grownups	CBS	
2004 (62nd)	Julianna Margulies	Maren Jackson	The Grid	TNT	
2004 (62nd)	Miranda Richardson	Queen Mary	The Lost Prince	PBS	
2004 (62nd)	Hilary Swank	Alice Paul	Iron Jawed Angels	HBO	
2005 (63rd)
2005 (63rd)	S. Epatha Merkerson ‡	Rachel "Nanny" Crosby	Lackawanna Blues	HBO	
2005 (63rd)	Halle Berry	Janie Crawford	Their Eyes Were Watching God	ABC	
2005 (63rd)	Kelly Macdonald	Gina	The Girl in the Café	HBO	
2005 (63rd)	Cynthia Nixon	Eleanor Roosevelt	Warm Springs	HBO	
2005 (63rd)	Mira Sorvino	Agent Kate Morozov / Katya Morozova	Human Trafficking	Lifetime	
2006 (64th)
2006 (64th)	Helen Mirren ‡	Queen Elizabeth I	Elizabeth I	HBO	
2006 (64th)	Gillian Anderson	Lady Honoria Dedlock	Bleak House	PBS	
2006 (64th)	Annette Bening	Jean Harris	Mrs. Harris	HBO	
2006 (64th)	Helen Mirren	Jane Tennison	Prime Suspect: The Final Act	PBS	
2006 (64th)	Sophie Okonedo	Susie Carter	Tsunami: The Aftermath	HBO	
2007 (65th)
2007 (65th)	Queen Latifah ‡	Ana Wallace	Life Support	HBO	
2007 (65th)	Bryce Dallas Howard	Rosalind	As You Like It	HBO	
2007 (65th)	Debra Messing	Molly Kagan	The Starter Wife	USA	
2007 (65th)	Sissy Spacek	Josie Cahill	Pictures of Hollis Woods	CBS	
2007 (65th)	Ruth Wilson	Jane Eyre	Jane Eyre	PBS	
2008 (66th)
2008 (66th)	Laura Linney ‡	Abigail Adams	John Adams	HBO	
2008 (66th)	Judi Dench	Matilda "Matty" Jenkyns	Cranford	PBS	
2008 (66th)	Catherine Keener	Gertrude Baniszewski	An American Crime	Showtime	
2008 (66th)	Shirley MacLaine	Coco Chanel	Coco Chanel	Lifetime	
2008 (66th)	Susan Sarandon	Doris Duke	Bernard and Doris	HBO	
2009 (67th)
2009 (67th)	Drew Barrymore ‡	Edith "Little Edie" Beale	Grey Gardens	HBO	
2009 (67th)	Joan Allen	Georgia O'Keeffe	Georgia O'Keeffe	Lifetime	
2009 (67th)	Jessica Lange	Edith "Big Edie" Beale	Grey Gardens	HBO	
2009 (67th)	Anna Paquin	Irena Sendler	The Courageous Heart of Irena Sendler	CBS	
2009 (67th)	Sigourney Weaver	Mary Griffith	Prayers for Bobby	Lifetime	

=== 2010s ===
Year	Actor	Role	Program	Network	Ref
2010 (68th)
2010 (68th)	Claire Danes ‡	Temple Grandin	Temple Grandin	HBO	
2010 (68th)	Hayley Atwell	Aliena	The Pillars of the Earth	Starz	
2010 (68th)	Judi Dench	Matilda "Matty" Jenkyns	Return to Cranford	PBS	
2010 (68th)	Romola Garai	Emma Woodhouse	Emma	PBS	
2010 (68th)	Jennifer Love Hewitt	Samantha Horton	The Client List	Lifetime	
2011 (69th)
2011 (69th)	Kate Winslet ‡	Mildred Pierce	Mildred Pierce	HBO	
2011 (69th)	Romola Garai	Bel Rowley	The Hour	BBC America	
2011 (69th)	Diane Lane	Pat Loud	Cinema Verite	HBO	
2011 (69th)	Elizabeth McGovern	Cora Crawley, Countess of Grantham	Downton Abbey	PBS	
2011 (69th)	Emily Watson	Janet Leach	Appropriate Adult	Sundance Channel	
2012 (70th)
2012 (70th)	Julianne Moore ‡	Sarah Palin	Game Change	HBO	
2012 (70th)	Nicole Kidman	Martha Gellhorn	Hemingway & Gellhorn	HBO	
2012 (70th)	Jessica Lange	Sister Jude Martin / Judy Martin	American Horror Story: Asylum	FX	
2012 (70th)	Sienna Miller	Tippi Hedren	The Girl	HBO	
2012 (70th)	Sigourney Weaver	Elaine Barrish	Political Animals	USA	
2013 (71st)
2013 (71st)	Elisabeth Moss ‡	Det. Robin Griffin	Top of the Lake	Sundance Channel	
2013 (71st)	Helena Bonham Carter	Elizabeth Taylor	Burton & Taylor	BBC America	
2013 (71st)	Rebecca Ferguson	Elizabeth Woodville	The White Queen	Starz	
2013 (71st)	Jessica Lange	Fiona Goode	American Horror Story: Coven	FX	
2013 (71st)	Helen Mirren	Linda Kenney Baden	Phil Spector	HBO	
2014 (72nd)
2014 (72nd)	Maggie Gyllenhaal ‡	Nessa Stein, Baroness Stein of Tilbury	The Honourable Woman	Sundance Channel	
2014 (72nd)	Jessica Lange	Elsa Mars	American Horror Story: Freak Show	FX	
2014 (72nd)	Frances McDormand	Olive Kitteridge	Olive Kitteridge	HBO	
2014 (72nd)	Frances O'Connor	Emily Hughes	The Missing	Starz	
2014 (72nd)	Allison Tolman	Molly Solverson	Fargo	FX	
2015 (73rd)
2015 (73rd)	Lady Gaga ‡	Elizabeth Johnson / The Countess	American Horror Story: Hotel	FX	
2015 (73rd)	Kirsten Dunst	Peggy Blumquist	Fargo	FX	
2015 (73rd)	Sarah Hay	Claire Robbins	Flesh and Bone	Starz	
2015 (73rd)	Felicity Huffman	Barbara "Barb" Hanlon	American Crime	ABC	
2015 (73rd)	Queen Latifah	Bessie Smith	Bessie	HBO	
2016 (74th)
2016 (74th)	Sarah Paulson ‡	Marcia Clark	The People v. O. J. Simpson: American Crime Story	FX	
2016 (74th)	Felicity Huffman	Leslie Graham	American Crime	ABC	
2016 (74th)	Riley Keough	Christine Reade	The Girlfriend Experience	Starz	
2016 (74th)	Charlotte Rampling	Frances Turner	London Spy	BBC America	
2016 (74th)	Kerry Washington	Anita Hill	Confirmation	HBO	
2017 (75th)
2017 (75th)	Nicole Kidman ‡	Celeste Wright	Big Little Lies	HBO	
2017 (75th)	Jessica Biel	Cora Tannetti	The Sinner	USA	
2017 (75th)	Jessica Lange	Joan Crawford	Feud: Bette and Joan	FX	
2017 (75th)	Susan Sarandon	Bette Davis	Feud: Bette and Joan	FX	
2017 (75th)	Reese Witherspoon	Madeline Martha Mackenzie	Big Little Lies	HBO	
2018 (76th)
2018 (76th)	Patricia Arquette ‡	Joyce "Tilly" Mitchell	Escape at Dannemora	Showtime	
2018 (76th)	Amy Adams	Camille Preaker	Sharp Objects	HBO	
2018 (76th)	Connie Britton	Debra Newell	Dirty John	Bravo	
2018 (76th)	Laura Dern	Jennifer Fox	The Tale	HBO	
2018 (76th)	Regina King	Latrice Butler	Seven Seconds	Netflix	
2019 (77th)
2019 (77th)	Michelle Williams ‡	Gwen Verdon	Fosse/Verdon	FX	
2019 (77th)	Kaitlyn Dever	Marie Adler	Unbelievable	Netflix	
2019 (77th)	Joey King	Gypsy-Rose Blanchard	The Act	Hulu	
2019 (77th)	Helen Mirren	Catherine the Great	Catherine the Great	HBO	
2019 (77th)	Merritt Wever	Detective Karen Duvall	Unbelievable	Netflix	

=== 2020s ===
Year	Actor	Role	Program	Network	Ref
2020 (78th)
2020 (78th)	Anya Taylor-Joy ‡	Beth Harmon	The Queen's Gambit	Netflix	
2020 (78th)	Cate Blanchett	Phyllis Schlafly	Mrs. America	FX / Hulu	
2020 (78th)	Daisy Edgar-Jones	Marianne Sheridan	Normal People	BBC / Hulu	
2020 (78th)	Shira Haas	Esther "Esty" Shapiro	Unorthodox	Netflix	
2020 (78th)	Nicole Kidman	Grace Fraser	The Undoing	HBO	
2021 (79th)
2021 (79th)	Kate Winslet ‡	Marianne "Mare" Sheehan	Mare of Easttown	HBO	
2021 (79th)	Jessica Chastain	Mira Phillips	Scenes from a Marriage	HBO	
2021 (79th)	Cynthia Erivo	Aretha Franklin	Genius	NatGeo	
2021 (79th)	Elizabeth Olsen	Wanda Maximoff	WandaVision	Disney+	
2021 (79th)	Margaret Qualley	Alex Russell	Maid	Netflix	
2022 (80th)
2022 (80th)	Amanda Seyfried ‡	Elizabeth Holmes	The Dropout	Hulu	
2022 (80th)	Jessica Chastain	Tammy Wynette	George & Tammy	Showtime	
2022 (80th)	Julia Garner	Anna Delvey	Inventing Anna	Netflix	
2022 (80th)	Lily James	Pamela Anderson	Pam & Tommy	Hulu	
2022 (80th)	Julia Roberts	Martha Mitchell	Gaslit	Starz	
2023 (81st)
2023 (81st)	Ali Wong ‡	Amy Lau	Beef	Netflix	
2023 (81st)	Riley Keough	Daisy Jones	Daisy Jones & the Six	Prime Video	
2023 (81st)	Brie Larson	Elizabeth Zott	Lessons in Chemistry	Apple TV+	
2023 (81st)	Elizabeth Olsen	Candy Montgomery	Love & Death	HBO Max	
2023 (81st)	Juno Temple	Dorothy "Dot" Lyon	Fargo	FX	
2023 (81st)	Rachel Weisz	Beverly Mantle / Elliot Mantle	Dead Ringers	Prime Video	
2024 (82nd)
2024 (82nd)	Jodie Foster ‡	Liz Danvers	True Detective: Night Country	HBO	
2024 (82nd)	Cate Blanchett	Catherine Ravenscroft	Disclaimer	Apple TV+	
2024 (82nd)	Cristin Milioti	Sofia Falcone	The Penguin	HBO	
2024 (82nd)	Sofia Vergara	Griselda Blanco	Griselda	Netflix	
2024 (82nd)	Naomi Watts	Barbara "Babe" Paley	Feud: Capote vs. the Swans	FX	
2024 (82nd)	Kate Winslet	Elena Vernham	The Regime	HBO	
2025 (83rd)
2025 (83rd)	Michelle Williams ‡	Molly Kochan	Dying for Sex	FX on Hulu	
2025 (83rd)	Claire Danes	Agatha "Aggie" Wiggs	The Beast in Me	Netflix	
2025 (83rd)	Rashida Jones	Amanda Waters	Black Mirror	Netflix	
2025 (83rd)	Amanda Seyfried	Mickey Fitzpatrick	Long Bright River	Peacock	
2025 (83rd)	Sarah Snook	Marissa Irvine	All Her Fault	Peacock	
2025 (83rd)	Robin Wright	Laura Sanderson	The Girlfriend	Prime Video	

== Superlatives ==
=== Multiple wins ===
Wins	Name
2	Ann-Margret
2	Judy Davis
2	Helen Mirren
2	Michelle Williams
2	Kate Winslet

=== Multiple nominations ===
Nominations	Name
8	Jessica Lange
8	Helen Mirren
4	Ann-Margret
4	Glenn Close
4	Judy Davis
4	Farrah Fawcett
4	Vanessa Redgrave
4	Jane Seymour
3	Helena Bonham Carter
3	Judi Dench
3	Laura Dern
3	Holly Hunter
3	Nicole Kidman
3	Shirley MacLaine
3	Gena Rowlands
3	Kate Winslet
3	Joanne Woodward
2	Drew Barrymore
2	Halle Berry
2	Cate Blanchett
2	Jessica Chastain
2	Claire Danes
2	Romola Garai
2	Felicity Huffman
2	Glenda Jackson
2	Ann Jillian
2	Riley Keough
2	Christine Lahti
2	Queen Latifah
2	Julianna Margulies
2	Frances O'Connor
2	Elizabeth Olsen
2	Miranda Richardson
2	Susan Sarandon
2	Amanda Seyfried
2	Leelee Sobieski
2	Mira Sorvino
2	Meryl Streep
2	Marlo Thomas
2	Rachel Ward
2	Sigourney Weaver
2	Michelle Williams
2	Alfre Woodard
2	Loretta Young

== See also ==
- Critics' Choice Television Award for Best Actress in a Movie/Miniseries
- Primetime Emmy Award for Outstanding Lead Actress in a Limited Series or Movie
- Screen Actors Guild Award for Outstanding Performance by a Female Actor in a Miniseries or Television Movie
