= Louder, Louder! =

Louder! Louder!

Studio album by Killola
- Released: January 2006
- Recorded: 2005–2006 in Los Angeles
- Genre: Hard rock Power pop Alternative rock Post-punk revival
- Length: 27:04
- Label: independent
- Producer: Killola

Killola chronology
Louder! Louder! (2006)	I Am The Messer (2008)

Louder, Louder! is the debut album by American rock band Killola, released in 2006. Recorded at locations all over Los Angeles in late 2005 and early 2006, Killola spent close to zero on the entire production itself. It features Barrel of Donkeys, their first single, which was released as a limited-print 7" vinyl single by England-based label Kerascene Recordings.

== Track listing ==
All songs written by Killola

1. "Barrel of Donkeys" – 3:56
2. "Appetite" – 2:09
3. "I Don't Know Who" – 3:37
4. "Get Around" – 3:31
5. "It's All Right" – 4:55
6. "Rip-off Artist" – 3:05
7. "Hollow" – 3:06
8. "Bonus Rock Track" – 2:50

== Personnel ==
- Lisa Rieffel – vocals
- Johnny Dunn – bass
- Mike Ball – guitar
- Danny Grody – drums

== Notes ==
Bonus Rock Track is in fact a cover of the Ween song Dr. Rock. There was a video made for the song I Don't Know Who which features lead singer Lisa Rieffel attempting to escape from a mental institution.
