= Killola =

American rock band

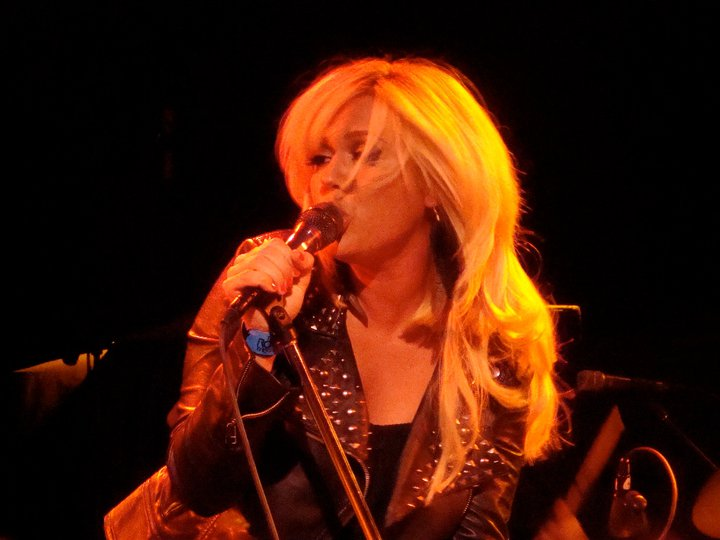
- Lead singer Lisa Rieffel in 2010

Background information
- Origin: Los Angeles, California, U.S.
- Genres: Indie rock, power pop, alternative rock, post-punk revival
- Years active: 2003–present
- Members: Lisa Rieffel; Johnny Dunn; Dan Grody
- Past members: BJ McDonnell; Mike Ball; Steven "Sven" Shenar; Dan Cleary; Timm Sharp
- Website: killola.com

Killola is an independent American rock band from Los Angeles, consisting of Lisa Rieffel (lead vocals), Dan Grody (drums) and Johnny Dunn (bass, guitar). The band's varied musical style is primarily garage pop with punk and pop/electronica influences. Many of their songs make integrated use of layered vocal harmonies and synthesizers. The band possesses a notable DIY work ethic, and maintains a widespread, global fanbase thanks to multiple self-produced releases, free downloads and heavy internet presence.

The band was awarded "Best Use of Emerging Technologies, 2010" by the New York City-based music blog We All Make Music, alongside OK Go and Ben Folds. Killola fans from all over the world submit photos of their band-related tattoos via the group's social networking sites. Tattooed fans are granted free-admission to shows, when the band is able to accommodate.

== Career ==
The group formed in 2003 in Los Angeles. They recorded and released a free four-song EP on stencil-screened CD-Rs, packaged in hand-painted sleeves. The band frequently dropped stacks of the free EPs at Amoeba Music in Hollywood, and at various stores, bars, coffee shops and venues around Los Angeles.

The first formal Killola record Louder, Louder!, was released in January 2006. They recorded the album with friends at locations all over Los Angeles, spending close to zero on the entire production itself. Thiseight8-song CD sold steadily and heavily over the internet and at live shows, with strong internet-orders coming from England. This led to a May 2007 tour of the United Kingdom, actually pre-empting the band's first United States tour. "Barrel of Donkeys", the opening track of Louder, Louder!, was released as a limited-print 7" vinyl single by England-based label Kerascene Recordings.

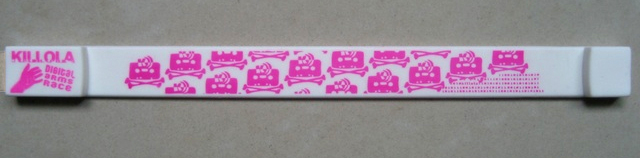
In addition to CD format, Killola released their second album, I Am the Messer, on limited edition Killola USB flash-drive bracelets, preloaded with their album and several videos.

In 2007, the band self-booked an 11-show UK tour through email and Myspace. The final performance of this tour was recorded as a live studio-session, to analog tape, at BreakThru Radio (BTR) in Bury St Edmunds, Suffolk, England. The resulting 12-song Live in England radio-session was offered as a free download to fans. The band also released a double-disc DVD/CD package in the summer of 2007. Killola filmed and recorded a performance at the all-ages East Hollywood venue Safari Sam's on October 6, 2006, and from this recording they produced a live DVD/CD entitled Live in Hollywood.

Their second album, I Am the Messer, was recorded in Los Angeles, California in late 2007 and early 2008; for production, the band tapped Luke Tierney (close friend and member of The Playing Favorites, and The Penfifteen Club), tracking the record in Tierney's home studio in Laurel Canyon. I Am the Messer was released in April 2008 on CD, as well as sold on USB drives. Killola was one of the first acts to distribute an album on USB flash drive wristbands. The drives, entitled 'Digital Arms bRACElets', were pre-loaded with I Am the Messer mp3 files, along with several hidden songs, photos and videos.

In September 2008, Killola co-headlined a tour throughout the entire United States with indie-powerpop band The Action Design, from San Francisco, California. The tour lasted 32 days and the bands played a total of 27 shows together.

Killola, Semi Precious Weapons, Nico Vega and Von Iva all performed on the 'Hell on Heels' tour, in early 2009. Killola opened for New York Dolls at SXSW in March 2009, and supported new-wave pioneers Berlin for multiple dates in April 2009. Kristeen Young and Killola did a west-coast tour of the United States in May 2009.

Killola began their "Buy the Milk" U.S. tour on March 10, 2010, at Crazy Girls in Hollywood, California. On August 20, 2010, Killola's partnership with Aderra Inc. and their USB flash drive album were profiled on the Los Angeles Times Music Blog.

On March 18, 2010, Killola announced the release of their Let's Get Associated album available on a USB Dog Tag Flash Drive. The USB Dog Tag is reported to also include their entire CD back catalog of Louder, Louder and I Am the Messer. On December 17, 2010, Killola was featured in an article written by Damian Kulash, singer of rock band OK Go, in The Wall Street Journal. The article was an overview of Kulash's opinions about the future of the music industry. He cited Killola's partnership with Aderra Inc. as a prime example of how emerging artists can make money while touring.

== World's first live performance via an album ==
On June 17, 2010, Killola performed four songs live with video, streaming real-time to a secret hidden page embedded in every USB Dog-Tag version of their Let's Get Associated album. Fans who owned the record were instructed via Twitter to "plug in your USB album tonight at 7pm PST and we'll perform for you." This was the world's first ever live-streaming performance from inside an album. A second in-album performance took place on July 22, 2010, and was recorded and released free to non-Dog-Tag-owning fans. This performance inside the up-datable USB Dog-Tag was noteworthy in the "Best Use of Emerging Technologies, 2010" award from NYC-based music blog We All Make Music.

== Free downloadable album ==
On August 12, 2008, Killola "freeleased" their second album I Am the Messer as a completely free downloadable album. This was made possible through a digital distribution agreement/partnership with New York/San Francisco-based digilabel True Anthem. The record was offered via an embeddable web 'widget' allowing the free-download mechanism to spread virally throughout the internet. The band offered two previously unavailable bonus tracks to listeners who downloaded the album in its entirety. The bonus tracks became 'unlocked' after the entire album was successfully downloaded. The album is free, based on a sponsorship by DW Drums, and Skullcandy. I Am the Messer remains available for free download via the band's website.

== Appearances ==
Killola music was featured in three consecutive installments of LG15:The Resistance, an interactive web spin-off of the massively popular lonelygirl15 video series. The band released an alternate duet-version of "Is This a Love Song?" featuring renowned French singer Anaïs. This duet-version incorporates a verse in French, as the two singers interchange lines and melodies. The song was released for free, and currently remains available for free download on the band's website.

Killola was the first band to be showcased on DIRECTV's original program The Fizz as the "Indie Music Pick." In March 2007, Killola made an appearance on the Playboy TV program "Night Calls" with hosts Jesse Jane and Kirsten Price. In September 2007, Rieffel and Dunn began hosting a weekly internet music/talk show on Spread Radio Live, a non-FCC regulated web-based radio station founded by Dave Navarro. The popular show broadcasts live on Monday nights at 7 p.m. (PST) on the band's website.

An alternate version of the Killola song entitled "I Wanna See Your Dick" was leaked onto the internet in 2010. The song features a guest-appearance from rapper Shunda K of Yo! Majesty.

Killola released a music video for their song "Cracks In The Armor" on September 9, 2009. The video was produced by the band and the director with no outside funding or assistance. It features lead singer Lisa Rieffel who has been kidnapped to an underwater television studio where she is forced to perform for fish puppets. The other members of the band appear as commandos who enter the underwater world and free her to perform once again as a full band.

Killola also released a music video for their song "She's a Bitch" on May 5, 2011. The video was directed by Hank Friedmann who helmed "Cracks In The Armor" for the band and has an appearance by actress Taryn Manning.

== Discography ==
=== Albums ===
- Louder, Louder! (2006)
- I Am the Messer (2008)
- Let's Get Associated (2010)
- No Class (2013)

=== DVDs ===
- Killola: Live in Hollywood (2007)
