= I Am the Messer =

Studio album by Killola
- Released: August 12, 2008
- Recorded: 2008 in Los Angeles
- Genre: Hard rock Power pop Alternative rock Post-punk revival
- Length: 29:41
- Label: independent
- Producer: Luke Tierney

Killola chronology
Louder, Louder! (2006)	I Am the Messer (2008)

I Am the Messer is the second studio album by American rock band Killola, released in 2008. The album was "freeleased" as a completely free downloadable album. This was made possible through a digital distribution agreement/partnership with New York/San Francisco-based digilabel True Anthem, and sponsorships with DW Drums, and Skullcandy. The record was offered via an embeddable web 'widget' allowing the free-download mechanism to spread virally throughout the internet. The band offered two previously unavailable bonus tracks to listeners who downloaded the album in its entirety. The bonus tracks became 'unlocked' after the entire album was successfully downloaded.

== Track listing ==
All songs written by Killola

1. "This Is How The World Ends" – 3:33
2. "All Of My Idols Are Dead" – 3:00
3. "Strung Out On Sunshine" – 3:02
4. "Is This A Love Song?" – 3:30
5. "The Man From Kilimanjaro (Interlude)" – 1:17
6. "Personal Graveyard" – 3:29
7. "Heartrate 160" – 2:41
8. "Wa Da We Da" – 2:46
9. "You Can't See Me Because I'm A Stalker" – 3:29
10. "10,000 Pound Ego" – 2:58

== Unlockable Bonus Tracks ==
Both written by Killola

"Who We Think We Are" – 3:51
"Cracks In The Armor" – 3:44

== Personnel ==
- Lisa Rieffel – vocals
- Johnny Dunn – bass
- Mike Ball – guitar
- Danny Grody – drums

== Notes ==
The song Is This A Love Song was later released with added vocals from French singer Anais. The title of the album comes from a lyric in the song 10,000 Pound Ego.
