= Ann Jillian =

American actress (born 1950)

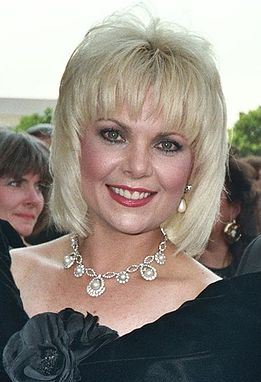
- Jillian at the 1988 Emmy Awards
- Born: Ann Jura Nauseda; January 29, 1950 (age 76); Cambridge, Massachusetts, U.S.
- Occupations: Actress; singer
- Years active: 1960–2000
- Known for: Babes in Toyland; It's a Living; Mae West; Gypsy; The Ann Jillian Story
- Spouse: Andrew L. Murcia (m. 1978)
- Children: 1

Ann Jillian (born Ann Jura Nauseda; January 29, 1950) is an American former actress and singer whose career began as a child actress in 1960. She is best known for her role as the sultry waitress Cassie Cranston on the 1980s sitcom It's a Living.

== Early life and career ==
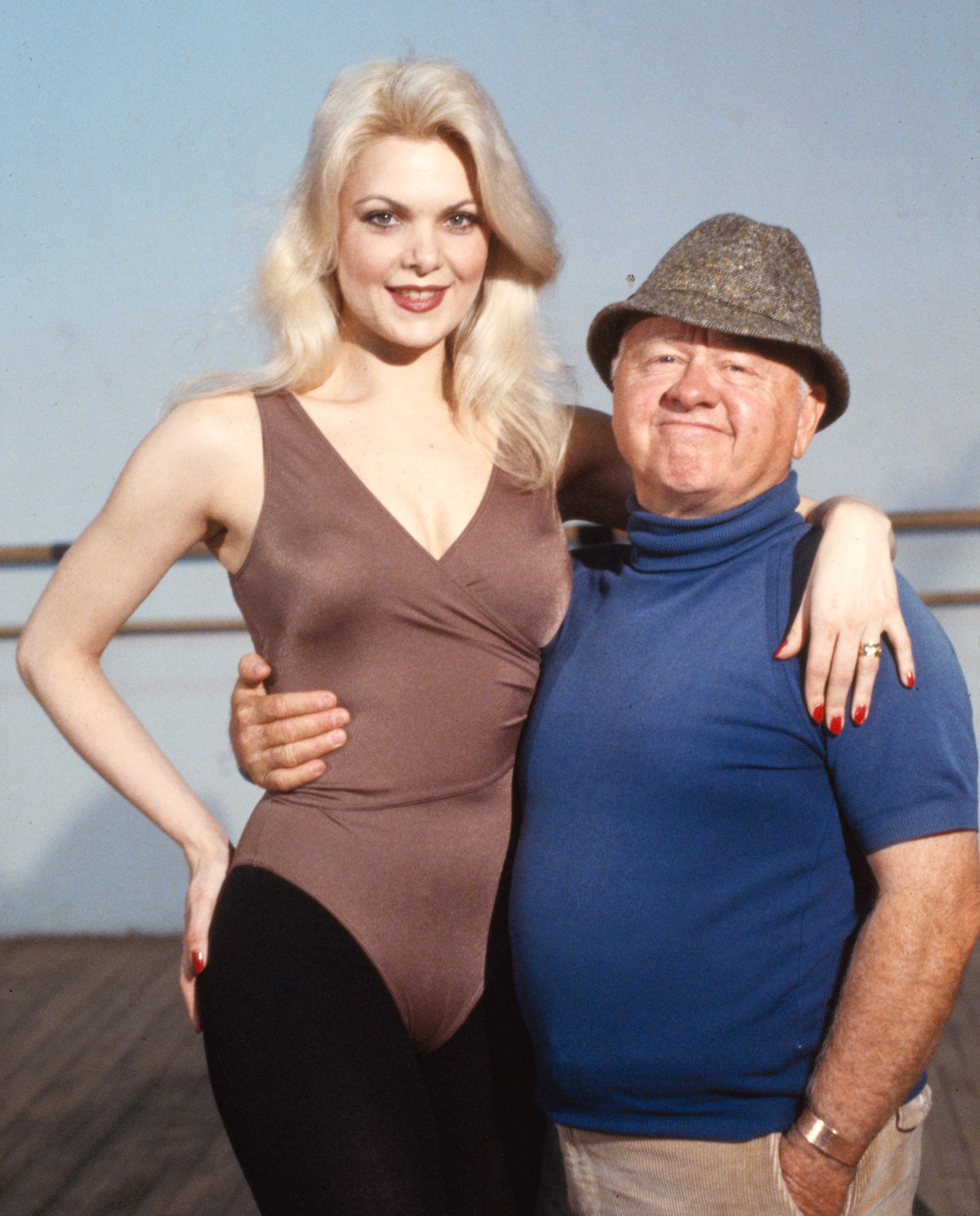
Jillian and Mickey Rooney in Sugar Babies, 1979

Jillian was born in Cambridge, Massachusetts, on January 29, 1950, to Lithuanian immigrant parents Juozas and Margarita Nausėda (later George and Margaret Nauseda) and speaks Lithuanian fluently. Jillian was raised as a devout Roman Catholic.

She began her career as a child actress in 1960 when she played Little Bo Peep in the Disney film Babes in Toyland. Jillian appeared as Dainty June in the Rosalind Russell-Natalie Wood movie version of Gypsy (1962). She had several television appearances in the 1960s and 1970s, becoming a regular on the 1960s sitcom Hazel (1965-66 season) and appearing in the 1963 Twilight Zone episode "Mute" (where she was given screen credit as "Ann Jilliann") as the mute telepath Ilse Nielsen. In 1983, Jillian was honored by the Young Artist Foundation with its Former Child Star "Lifetime Achievement" Award, recognizing her achievements within the entertainment industry as a child actress.

Jillian moved on to voice roles, for Scooby-Doo, Where Are You! and Sealab 2020 in the early 1970s, but — told she was too old to play youthful roles of the day and too young to play a leading lady — there was no more work for her in Hollywood. She took a department store job and studied psychology, but heeded the advice of casting director Hoyt Bowers and Walt Disney, who had told her, "Whatever you do, keep working at your craft".

Jillian married Andy Murcia, a Chicago police sergeant, on March 27, 1978, and shortly thereafter Murcia retired to manage his wife's career.

In the late 1970s, she toured in musical comedies, including Sammy Cahn's Words and Music. After appearing with Mickey Rooney in the play Goodnight Ladies in Chicago, the producers cast Jillian to appear in the original company of Sugar Babies on Broadway with Rooney and Ann Miller in 1979. She also starred in I Love My Wife at the Drury Lane Theatre in Chicago.

== 1980s fame ==
Jillian appeared in more than 25 films, mostly for television. Though she had nearly two decades' worth of film and television credits already, she first came to national prominence in the 1980s series It's a Living, a sitcom that elevated Jillian to sex symbol status in 1980. She was the last to be signed onto this series and received last place billing. The sitcom aired for two seasons on ABC before being cancelled due to low ratings and was sold into syndication for the burgeoning cable television market. (The show became a surprise success in syndication.) Toward the end of her time on the series for the ABC run, she portrayed Mae West in a 1982 made-for-television film. Jillian was nominated for a lead actress Emmy and Golden Globe for her performance.

In 1983, she appeared in the John Hughes movie Mr. Mom with Michael Keaton and Teri Garr. The same year, she appeared in the miniseries Malibu, starring Kim Novak, Eva Marie Saint and James Coburn. That fall she starred in her own sitcom, Jennifer Slept Here, a variation on The Ghost & Mrs. Muir, with Jillian as the apparition in question. Jennifer Slept Here ended in 1984, enabling her to take a role in the miniseries Ellis Island. For their work in the miniseries, Faye Dunaway and Ben Vereen were nominated for Golden Globe Awards, and Ann Jillian and Richard Burton were nominated for Emmy Awards.

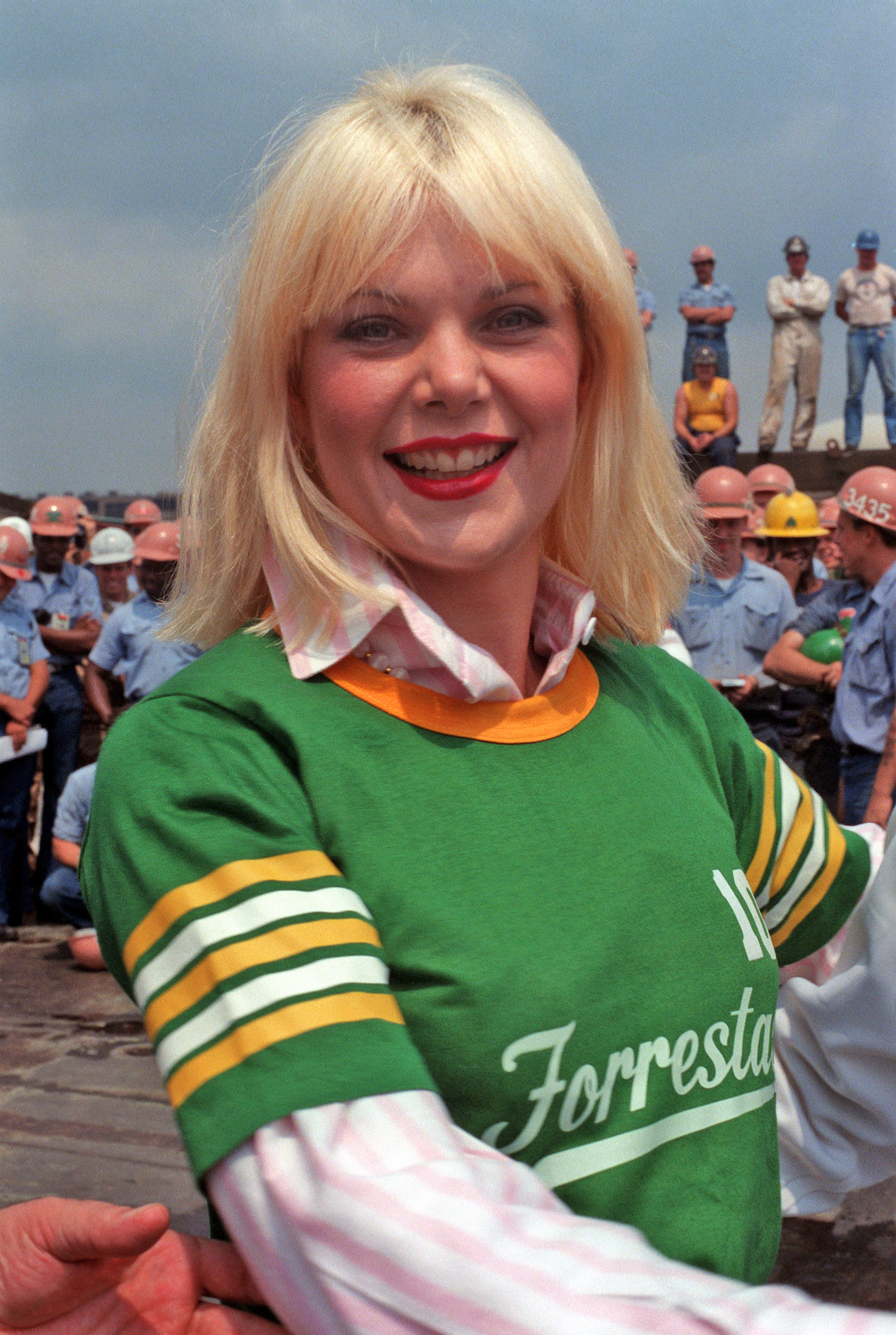
Ann Jillian in Philadelphia, 1984

Bob Hope selected her to appear in six of his television specials, including two, entertaining U.S. troops stationed in Beirut (1984) and Saudi Arabia (1991). She displayed her athletic abilities on three Battle of the Network Stars specials and a Circus of the Stars special, and appeared in the charity extravaganza Night of 100 Stars. She guest starred in television specials for Don Rickles (1986) and David Copperfield (1987) and was on the dais at The Dean Martin Celebrity Roast for Mr. T (1984). In 1985, she played The Red Queen to Carol Channing's White Queen in a television musical adaptation of Lewis Carroll's Alice in Wonderland. The same year, the producers of It's a Living made the relatively unheard-of decision to resume production of the series, by then three years off the air, for first-run syndication, and Jillian was contractually obligated to return to the series. In 1986, she played identical twins in The Killer In The Mirror, a loose remake of the 1964 Bette Davis movie Dead Ringer. She later starred on the namesake series Ann Jillian, which aired 13 episodes on NBC during the 1989–90 season. In 1994, she played the mother of an unborn child with a heart defect in Heart of a Child.

== Personal life ==
=== Family and later work ===
Jillian gave birth to her only child, a son, Andrew Joseph Murcia, in 1992. She continued to act, with ten TV movie roles throughout the 1990s, although her television and film credits became sporadic since the late 1990s, as she decided to devote herself to raising her son and to promoting breast cancer issues.

On September 12, 2015, Jillian was inducted into the National Lithuanian American Hall of Fame.

=== Cancer ===
Before resuming production on It's a Living in 1985, Jillian (then 35) made headlines when she was diagnosed with breast cancer, and she became a vocal advocate for cancer research and prevention. Leaving It's a Living after the 1985–86 season, she focused on beating her cancer, with treatment including a double mastectomy. Her battle with cancer was chronicled in the top-rated made-for-TV film, The Ann Jillian Story (1988), in which Jillian portrayed herself. The film required two years to be produced, due to conflicts in tone, the degree of medical information included, and the relatively limited, realistic reaction portrayed by Jillian and her stage husband, before and after her surgery. Jillian received her third Emmy Award nomination for Outstanding Lead Actress in a Miniseries or a Special, and won a 1989 Golden Globe Award for Best Performance by an Actress in a Mini-Series or Motion Picture Made for TV.

== Filmography ==
Film and television
Year	Title	Role	Notes
1960	Leave It to Beaver	Little Girl	Episode: "Wally, the Businessman"
1960	Shirley Temple's Storybook	Little Girl	Episode: "Madeline"
1961	Babes in Toyland	Bo Peep	
1962	Insight	Maria Goretti	Episode: "The Killer"
1962	Wagon Train	Sandra Carlson	Episode: "The Hobie Redman Story"
1962	Walt Disney's Wonderful World of Color	Portia "Rocky" Sylvester	Episode: "Sammy, the Way-Out Seal"
1962	Gypsy	Dainty June / June Havoc	
1963	Twilight Zone	Ilse Nielsen	Episode: "Mute"
1963–1966	Hazel	Laurie / Millie	12 episodes
1964	My Three Sons	Debbie Rogers	Episode: "The Ballad of Lissa Stratmeyer"
1971	The Partridge Family	Second Girl	Episode: "Days of Acne and Roses"
1972	The New Scooby-Doo Movies	Unknown	Voice; 3 episodes
1972	Sealab 2020	Gail Adams	Voice; 13 episodes
1974	Kojak	Joanna	Episode: "Die Before They Wake"
1980	The Love Boat	Rena Ward	2 episodes
1980–1986	It's a Living	Cassie Cranston	49 episodes
1986	Killer in the Mirror	Samantha DeLorca / Karen Edwards	
1981	Fantasy Island	Delphine McNab	Episode: "Delphine/The Unkillable"
1982	Mae West	Mae West	Television movie Nominated – Golden Globe Award for Best Actress – Miniseries or Television Film; Nominated - Primetime Emmy Award for Outstanding Lead Actress in a Miniseries or a Movie
1983	Girls of the White Orchid	Marilyn	Television movie; alternative title Death Ride to Osaka
1983	Mr. Mom	Joan	
1983	Fantasy	singing duet w/ Clint Holmes "Friends In Love"	NBC game show - Daytime Emmy Award for co-host Leslie Uggams 1983 - Peter Marshall co-host
1983–1984	Jennifer Slept Here	Jennifer Farrell	13 episodes
1984	Ellis Island	Nellie Byfield	Television movie Nominated – Primetime Emmy Award for Outstanding Supporting Actress in a Miniseries or a Movie
1985	Alice in Wonderland	Red Queen	Television movie
1987	Perry Mason: The Case of the Murdered Madam	Suzanne Domenico	Television movie
1988	The Ann Jillian Story	Herself	Television movie Won – Golden Globe Award for Best Actress – Miniseries or Television Film; Nominated – Primetime Emmy Award for Outstanding Lead Actress in a Miniseries or a Movie
1989	Little White Lies	Detective Liz Donaldson	Television movie
1989–1990	Ann Jillian	Ann McNeil	13 episodes
1993	Labor of Love: The Arlette Schweitzer Story	Arlette Schweitzer	Television movie
1994	The Disappearance of Vonnie	Corrine Kaczmarek	Television movie
1994	Heart of a Child	Alice Holc	Television movie
1996	Our Son, the Matchmaker	Julie Longwell	Television movie
1996	The Care and Handling of Roses	Jean Townsend	Television movie
1997	I'll Be Home for Christmas	Sarah	Television movie
1999	Touched by an Angel	Liz	Episode: "The Whole Truth and Nothing But..."
2000	Walker, Texas Ranger	Senator Angela Rhodes	Episode: "Winds of Change"

== See also ==
- List of people from Massachusetts
