= Ann Jillian (TV series) =

- Series premiere print advertisement
- Genre: Sitcom
- Created by: Deidre Fay; Stuart Wolpert
- Starring: Ann Jillian; Lisa Rieffel; Amy Lynne; Zachary Rosencrantz; Noble Willingham; Chantal Rivera-Batisse; Cynthia Harris
- Composer: Ray Colcord
- Country of origin: United States
- Original language: English
- No. of seasons: 1
- No. of episodes: 13 (3 unaired)

Production
- Executive producers: Deidre Fay; Stuart Wolpert; Ann Jillian
- Producers: Ernest Chambers; Rita Dillon
- Camera setup: Multi-camera
- Running time: 30 minutes
- Production companies: 9-J Inc.; Dahn Tahn Productions; Castle Rock Entertainment

Original release
- Network: NBC
- Release: November 30, 1989 – August 19, 1990

Ann Jillian is an American sitcom television series created by Deidre Fay and Stuart Wolpert, starring Ann Jillian that aired on NBC from November 30, 1989, to August 19, 1990. The series was produced by 9-J Inc., Dahn Tahn Productions and Castle Rock Entertainment.

== Plot ==
After the death of her firefighter husband, Ann McNeil, an ex-Radio City Music Hall Rockette, and her 14-year-old daughter Lucy, move from New York to a small northern California village named Marvel, where Ann and her husband went for their honeymoon. Lucy is apprehensive of her new surroundings in a new town and at first misses the fast-paced atmosphere of New York City, but she begins to adjust and makes new friends. Ann is also learning to adjust as well as she starts a new job at a gift shop run by Mrs. Hufnagel. The teens that Lucy hangs out with are Kaz, Melissa, and Robin. Kaz's well-meaning grandfather, Duke, helps Ann and Lucy in their new surroundings.

== Cast and characters ==
- Ann Jillian as Ann McNeil
- Lisa Rieffel as Lucy McNeil
- Noble Willingham as Duke Howard
- Cynthia Harris as Sheila Hufnagel
- Zachary Rosencrantz as Kaz Sumner
- Chantal Rivera-Batisse as Melissa Santos
- Amy Lynne as Robin Winkle

== Production ==
The pilot for the series was produced in early 1989, when it was called The Ann Jillian Show. Retitled Ann Jillian, it premiered as a series on NBC on November 30, 1989, running for 7 episodes before it was put on hiatus in January. The series returned briefly in August 1990, running three additional episodes before being cancelled after a final broadcast on August 19. Three further episodes had been produced, but never aired.

At the time the pilot for the series was produced, Castle Rock Entertainment, which produced the show, also had another pilot produced for NBC named The Seinfeld Chronicles starring stand-up comedian Jerry Seinfeld. When it tested poorly, and Ann Jillian tested more positively, Castle Rock Entertainment committed to Jillian's series, which was picked up for a full season order. However, the show would only last one season, whereas the subsequently re-titled Seinfeld lasted for nine seasons, ending in 1998, becoming among the most successful sitcoms in television history.

== Episodes ==
No.	Title	Directed by	Written by	Original release date	Prod. code
1	"California Dreamin'"	John Bowab	Deidre Fay & Stuart Wolpert	November 30, 1989	03-0101
2	"Interrupted Melody"	John Bowab	Deidre Fay & Stuart Wolpert	December 3, 1989	03-0102
3	"Love-15"	John Bowab	Efrem Seeger	December 10, 1989	03-0105
4	"Since I Don't Have You"	John Bowab	Lyla Oliver & Patrick Cleary	December 17, 1989	03-0108
5	"Buddy System"	John Bowab	Stephen Neigher	December 31, 1989	03-0103
6	"Career Week" "Shoots and Ladders"	John Bowab	Barbara Hall	January 7, 1990	03-0107
7	"The Crush"	John Bowab	Dick Bensfield & Jack Elinson	January 20, 1990	03-0109
8	"Run for the Roses"	John Bowab	Story by : Lyla Oliver & Patrick Cleary; Teleplay by : Lyla Oliver & Patrick Cleary and David S. Cohen & Roger S.H. Schulman	August 5, 1990	03-0111
9	"Old Friends"	John Bowab	Shelly Zellman	August 12, 1990	03-0112
10	"It's a Mall World After All"	John Bowab	Tom Straw	August 19, 1990	03-0113
Note: This episode, the last produced, effectively served as a "pilot" to a rebooted version of the series – from this episode forward, the focus of the series would have shifted to Ann McNeil's new job as the activities director of the local Marvel shopping mall and the characters she worked with there.
11	"Good Citizen"	John Bowab	Stephen Hattman & Stuart Wolpert	Unaired	03-0104
12	"A Housewarming"	John Bowab	Deidre Fay & Stuart Wolpert	Unaired	03-0106
13	"The Anniversary"	John Bowab	Lyla Oliver	Unaired	03-0110

== Reception ==
Howard Rosenberg of Los Angeles Times reviewed the comedy negatively, quipping that the series "has more Anns than laughs."
