= Girls of the White Orchid =

- Also known as: Death Ride to Osaka
- Genre: Crime; Drama
- Directed by: Jonathan Kaplan
- Music by: Brad Fiedel
- Country of origin: United States
- Original language: English

Production
- Executive producers: Leonard Hill; Philip Mandelker
- Producer: Claude Binyon Jr.
- Production location: Japan
- Editor: Brent A. Schoenfeld
- Running time: 98 minutes
- Production company: Hill/Mandelker Films

Original release
- Network: NBC
- Release: November 28, 1983

Girls of the White Orchid is a 1983 television film directed by Jonathan Kaplan. It is also known as Death Ride to Osaka.

== Premise ==
An American woman becomes a prostitute in Japan.

== Cast ==
- Jennifer Jason Leigh - Carol
- Thomas Byrd
- Mako
- Carolyn Seymour
- Richard Narita
- Soon-Tek Oh
- Ann Jillian
- Yvonne McCord
- Philip Charles MacKenzie
- Leslie Wing
- John Hancock

== Production ==
The film was based on a report by ABC's 20/20 show about women who go to Japan to work as entertainers but wind up as prostitutes under the control of the Yakuza. Producer Leonard Hill says NBC pressured him to cast a lead actress from an NBC show—Melinda Culea, who was then on The A-Team—but he held out for Jennifer Jason Leigh. "I don't care about The A-Team" said Hill. "I may make a mediocre movie but I'm not going to make a mediocre effort." However Hill did cast two other actors in the cast who were then on NBC shows, Ann Jillian and Thomas Byrd.

The film was shot on location in Japan.

After the initial lack of success of Over the Edge (1979), Kaplan encountered difficulties in finding budget for new films, which explains why he sought direct financial support from TV producers.

== Reception ==
One writer called it "the missing link between Kaplan's sensationalistic New World output (Night Call Nurses, The Student Teachers) and the socially conscious prestige dramas like The Accused and Immediate Family that he would make in the late '80s and early '90s."
