= Lisa Rieffel =

American actress and singer (born 1975)

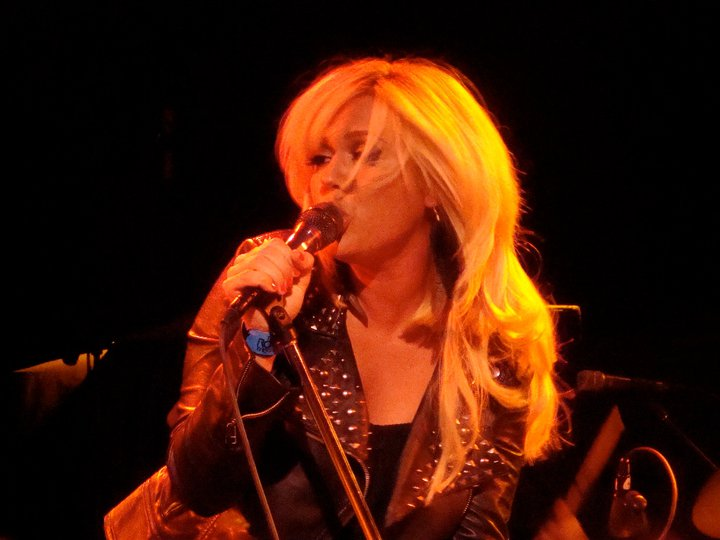
- Rieffel singing for Killola in 2010
- Born: January 12, 1975 (age 51); Denville, New Jersey, U.S.
- Occupations: Actress; singer
- Years active: 1986–present
- Spouse: Johnny Dunn
- Children: 1
- Musical career
- Genres: Indie rock; power pop; alternative rock; post-punk revival
- Instrument: Vocals
- Member of: Killola

Lisa Rieffel (born January 12, 1975) is an American actress and singer.

== Life and career ==
Rieffel was born in Denville, New Jersey. As a child actress, she starred on Broadway and at The Kennedy Center in Raggedy Ann: The Musical Adventure. She is a founding member and lead singer of the Los Angeles-based alternative rock band Killola. The band has released three albums: Louder, Louder! (2006), I Am the Messer (2008) and Let's Get Associated (2010) as well as a live DVD/CD titled Killola: Live in Hollywood (2007).

In television, Rieffel was a series regular in The Thorns, Ann Jillian, The Trials of Rosie O'Neill, Women of the House, and Empty Nest (season 5 only). In 1998, Rieffel was an original cast member of The King of Queens during the show's first season, appearing in five of the sitcom's first six episodes before leaving the show. Some of Rieffel's other television credits include The Cosby Show, Blossom, Roseanne, Married... with Children, Party of Five, The Pretender, Dr. Quinn, Medicine Woman, Brotherly Love, and NCIS.

Her film credits include Forget Paris (1995) and Drowning Mona (2000).

Rieffel co-wrote and recorded a song entitled "So Pretty" for the 2003 film Legally Blonde 2: Red, White & Blonde; the song, however, was not featured on the soundtrack album.

In 2007, Rieffel starred in the cult-popular web-series Girltrash! created by Angela Robinson. Girltrash! was a gritty, pulp comedy-drama with a decidedly lesbian spin. The web-series co-starred Rieffel, Margaret Cho, Rose Rollins, Michelle Lombardo, Riki Lindhome, Jimmi Simpson, Mandy Musgrave, and Gabrielle Christian. The webisodic consisted of 11 installments, airing weekly via OurChart.com, a fictitious website-turned-social-network controlled by Showtime. The feature film Girltrash: All Night Long began production in December 2009. The script was written by Angela Robinson, with Killola writing and producing the original songs for the film's musical numbers. After several postponements, Girltrash: All Night Long was finally released in January 2014.

In 2019, Rieffel formed the band H. Kink with former Killola member and actor Timm Sharp, releasing their first album Wish I Were Here. Sharp left the band shortly after, and Rieffel continued to release music solo under the H. Kink name until Sharp rejoined for their second album in 2023, Karate.

In 2025, Rieffel began releasing music under the solo project name Fur Trapper.

== Personal life ==
Rieffel is married to Killola bassist Johnny Dunn. They have a daughter, Jolee Rose (born December 2011), who gained viral fame in May 2020 for her original song "I Wonder What's Inside Your Butthole".

== Filmography ==
Film
Year	Title	Role	Notes
1995	Forget Paris	Receptionist	
2000	Drowning Mona	Valerie Antonelli	
2004	Stop Thief!	Sophie Lyons	Short film
2010	3B	Natasha	Short film
2014	Girltrash: All Night Long	Daisy Robson	

Television
Year	Title	Role	Notes
1986	The Alan King Show	Casey Cooper	Unsold CBS pilot
1988	In the Line of Duty: The F.B.I. Murders	Suzanne McNeill	Television film
1988	The Thorns	Joey Thorn	Series regular
1989–1990	The Cosby Show	Susan Hennings	Episodes: "Denise: The Saga Continues" (uncredited), "I'm "In" with the In Crowd" and "Off to See the Wretched"
1989–1990	Ann Jillian	Lucy McNeil	Series regular
1991	The Gambler Returns: The Luck of the Draw	Jenny Jones	Television film
1992	Evening Shade	High School Freida	Episode: "Callous Hearts of Rage"
1990–1992	The Trials of Rosie O'Neill	KIm Ginty	Series regular
1992	Blossom	Cybill	Episode: "No Cure for Love"
1992	Married... with Children	D.J.	Episode: "T-R-A-Something-Something Spells Tramp" (credited as Dusty Street)
1993	Love, Lies & Lullabies	Rachel	Television film
1993	Empty Nest	Emily Weston	Series regular (season 5; 14 episodes)
1993	In the Heat of the Night	Lori Foster	Episode: "A Depraved Hart"
1993	The Flood: Who Will Save Our Children?	Leanne Pond	Television film
1994	Dr. Quinn, Medicine Woman	Atlantis	Episode: "The Circus"
1994	Roseanne	Dinah	Episode: "The Parenting Trap"
1995	Women of the House	Veda Walkman	Series regular (episodes 8–12)
1995	The Client	Holly Calhoun	Episode: "A Perfect World"
1996	The Crew	Cindy	Episode: "A League of Their Own"
1996	Brotherly Love	Amy	Episode: "Double Date"
1996	Love and Marriage	Kathleen	Episodes: "Look Who's Talking Now" & "Ain't No Way to Treat a Lady"
1996	Party of Five	Robin	Episode: "Personal Demons"
1996	Sliders	Deanne Bloch	Episode: "Dead Man Sliding"
1996	Style & Substance	Samantha Stevens	Unsold ABC pilot (later re-developed and picked up to series by CBS, aired in 1998)
1997	The Pretender	Jeanette Connelly	Episode: "Baby Love"
1997	Total Security	Jessica Larson	Episode: "Das Bootie"
1998	The Patron Saint of Liars	Beatrice	Television film
1998	The King of Queens	Sara Spooner	Series regular (appeared in five of the first six episodes of season 1)
2003	Lost at Home	Molly	Episodes: "One Bracelet Don't Feed the Beast" & "Our Town"
2007	Girltrash!	Daisy Robson	Series regular (web series)
2009	NCIS	Brenda Carter	Episode: "Caged"
2022	Pivoting	Celia	Episode: "Coleen in a Box"
