= The Ann Jillian Story =

1988 American made-for-television movie

- Genre: Drama, biography
- Written by: Audrey Davis Levin
- Directed by: Corey Allen
- Starring: Ann Jillian; Tony Lo Bianco
- Country of origin: United States
- Original language: English

Original release
- Network: NBC
- Release: April 1, 1988

The Ann Jillian Story is a 1988 made-for-television film.

== Overview ==
The real life story of actress Ann Jillian's struggle with breast cancer.

== Reception ==
The film was shown on NBC on January 4, 1988, and had a 23.8 rating and a 35% share of the audience which made it the third highest-rated television movie of the 1987–88 season in the United States behind the finale of Magnum, P.I. and Elvis and Me.

== Accolades ==
Ann Jillian received her third Emmy Award nomination for Outstanding Lead Actress in a Miniseries or a Special, and won a 1989 Golden Globe Award for Best Performance by an Actress in a Mini-Series or Motion Picture Made for TV.
