= Lombardo Boyar =

American actor (born 1973)

- Born: December 1, 1973 (age 52); El Paso, Texas, U.S.
- Occupation: Actor
- Years active: 1996–present

Lombardo Boyar (born December 1, 1973) is an American actor. He is best known for his recurring role as Chuy in The Bernie Mac Show and for voicing Lars Rodriguez in Rocket Power.

== Career ==
Lombardo is a veteran of the United States Army, having served as a forward observer in the highly decorated 82nd Airborne Division during the 1990s.

Some of Boyar's notable performances include a brief part as convenience-store robber Ramon Garcia on Fox's 24 and a starring role as burglar Eddie Tesoro in P.S. Your Cat Is Dead. He provided voices in both Happy Feet and Coco. and Anglophone cable-TV audiences may also be familiar with Boyar's voice work as Lawrence "Lars" Rodriguez in Klasky-Csupo's Rocket Power cartoons and with his live-action performance as Sergio del Rio on Steven Bochco's Over There. He has also guested on a semi regular basis as Chuy on The Bernie Mac Show. Fluent in English and Spanish with a very adaptable voice, Boyar has also provided voice-over work for commercials.

Boyar had a voice acting role in the 2008 Turok video game as Gonzales.

== Filmography ==
=== Film ===
Year	Title	Role	Notes
1996	Rant	Lalo (voice)	Short Film
1997	Tear It Down		
1997	17 and Under	Gang Member Working on Car	
1999	EDtv	New York Guy	
1999	Candyman: Day of the Dead	Enrique	Direct-to-video
1999	Blink of an Eye	Guillermo	
2000	Gone in 60 Seconds	Paramedic	
2000	Brother	Mo	
2001	Scenes of the Crime	Zeke	
2002	P.S. Your Cat Is Dead!	Eddie Tesoro	
2002	S1m0ne	Paparazzi Photographer	
2002	Never Get Outta the Boat	Cesar	
2003	The Wounded	Cartoon	Direct-to-video
2005	American Gun	Hector	
2006	Happy Feet	Raul (voice)	
2008	What Just Happened	Guard at Studio Gate	
2008	Beverly Hills Chihuahua	Praying Dog (voice)	
2008	The Last White Dishwasher	Rudy Valentine	Short Film
2009	Next Day Air	Carlos	
2010	Group Sex	Ramon	Direct-to-video
2011	Happy Feet Two	Raul (voice)	
2012	Least Among Saints	Armando	
2013	Big Ass Spider!	Jose Ramos	
2013	Viva America	Ricardo	Short Film
2013	Halfway to Hell	Emilio	
2014	Space Dogs: Adventure to the Moon	Chip (voice)	
2014	Spiralmind	Ramon	Short Film
2014	Dawn of the Planet of the Apes	Terry	
2014	Some Kind of Beautiful	Ernesto	
2015	Tales of Halloween	Gambling Neighbor	
2016	The Last Heist	Vendor	
2016	Pup Star	Doberman Guard (voice)	
2016	Ulterior Motives: Reality TV Massacre	Hector	
2016	Bad Santa 2	Valet Boss	
2017	The Bird Who Could Fly	Deputy Lombardo	Short Film
2017	Guerra	Carlo	Short Film
2017	Pup Star: Better 2Gether	Security Guard Dog (voice)	
2017	Coco	Plaza Mariachi / Gustavo (voice)	
2018	Josie	Romero	
2019	Endings, Beginnings	Fruit Stand Vendor	
2023	Candy Cane Lane	Scott	
2025	The Accountant 2	Tomas	

=== Television ===
Year	Title	Role	Notes
1996–1997	Dangerous Minds	Fatty	2 episodes
1997	Baywatch	Hector Molina	Episode: "Matters of the Heart"
1997	Malcolm & Eddie	Ernesto	Episode: "The Courtship of Eddie's Mother"
1997	Walker, Texas Ranger	Luis 'Flaco' Lopez	Episode: "Mr. Justice"
1997	Nothing Sacred	Paco	Episode: "A Bloody Miracle"
1997–2001	NYPD Blue	Tino / George Ruiz / Gangbanger #3	3 episodes
1998	Sparks		Episode: "Flirting with Disaster"
1998	Gia	Hood #2	TV movie
1998	ER	Morris Campbell	Episode: "Exodus"
1998	C-16: FBI	Ernesto Cruz	Episode: "Hitting Olansky"
1998	L.A. Doctors	Manny	Episode: "Fear of Flying"
1998	Frasier	Delivery Man	Episode: "Merry Christmas, Mrs. Moskowitz"
1998–1999	Silk Stalkings	Commissioner / Water Taxi Driver / Man on the Car	3 episodes
1999	Martial Law	Pablo	Episode: "Substitutes"
1999	To Serve and Protect	Tachi	Episode: "Part I"
1999	Becker	Hector	Episode: "Becker the Elder"
1999	The Pretender	Seelye	Episode: "Survival"
1999–2004	Rocket Power	Lars Rodriguez, Townsperson #2, Spectator #1, Boarder #2, Biker #2 (voices)	39 episodes
2000	The X-Files	Deputy Juan Molina	Episode: "X-Cops"
2001	The Division		Episode: "Forces of Deviance"
2001	Six Feet Under	Powerful	Episode: "Familia"
2001–2006	The Bernie Mac Show	Chuy	34 episodes
2002	Family Law	Officer Dash	Episode: "To Protect and Serve"
2002	First Monday		Episode: "Crime and Punishment"
2002	Rocket Power: Race Across New Zealand	Lars Rodriguez (voice)	TV movie
2002	Shadow Realm	Perez	TV movie
2002	Night Visions	Perez	Episode: "Patterns/Voices"
2003	Kingpin	Romulo	2 episodes
2003	24	Ramon Garcia	2 episodes
2003	CSI: Crime Scene Investigation	Jesse Commons	Episode: "All of Our Country"
2003	Boomtown	Eddie	Episode: "Wannabe"
2004	Threat Matrix	Victor Benitez	Episode: "Mexico"
2004	The D.A.	Diego Rodriguez	Episode: "The People vs. Oliver C. Handley"
2004	Taste	Carlos	TV movie
2004	Rocket Power: Island of the Menehune	Lars Rodriguez (voice)	TV movie
2004	Boston Legal	Ramone Valasquez	Episode: "Catch and Release"
2005	Without a Trace	Jorge Hernandez	Episode: "Neither Rain Nor Sleet"
2005	The Shield	Hernesto	Episode: "Hurt"
2005	Over There	Sergio Del Rio	9 episodes
2005	Joey	Dave	Episode: "Joey and the High School Friend"
2006	The Class	Scott	Episode: "The Class Runs Into a Convenience Store"
2006	Standoff	Felix Aguila	Episode: "Borderline"
2007	Biker Mice from Mars	Chaz Divini (voice)	Episode: Between Rump and a Hard Race"
2007–2008	Notes from the Underbelly	Hector	3 episodes
2008	Raising the Bar	Freddy Valerio	Episode: "Bagels and Locks"
2009	The Closer	Victor Rivera	Episode: "Products of Discovery"
2009	Cold Case	Cal Acevedo	Episode: "Hood Rats"
2009	CSI: Miami	Carlos Guzman	Episode: "In Plane Sight"
2010	Modern Family	Jose	Episode: "Starry Night"
2010	Miami Medical	Eddie Del Valle	Episode: "88 Seconds"
2011	Southland	Mr. Estrada	Episode: "Failure Drill"
2011	Breakout Kings	Carlos Zepeda	Episode: "These Are Rules"
2011	Little in Common	Benny Pacheco	TV movie
2012	The Life & Times of Tim	Eduardo's Son	Episode: "Super Gay Eduardo/The Pros and Cons of Killing Tim"
2012	NCIS	Felix Quintero	Episode: "Secrets"
2012	Awake	Jose	Episode: "Ricky's Tacos"
2012	GCB	Duarte	Episode: "Revelation"
2012	Outlaw Country	Mexican	TV movie
2013	The Joe Schmo Show	Chico, the Ex-Con	Episode: "The Bounty Begins"
2013	Shameless	Manuel	Episode: "El Gran Cañon"
2013	The Garcias Have Landed	Ernie Garcia	TV movie
2014	Jessie	Boomer	3 episodes
2014	Real Husbands of Hollywood	Guard #2	Episode: "Black Is the Same Old Black"
2014–2016	Murder in the First	Edgar Navarro	32 episodes
2015	The Player	Carlos Salvado	Episode: "Downtown Odds"
2016	Criminal Minds: Beyond Borders	Cedro Pena	Episode: "The Ballad of Nick and Nat"
2016	Man with a Plan	Dad	Episode: "Thanksgiving"
2017	American Crime	Rodrigo	Episode: "Season Three: Episode Two"
2020	Better Things	Jose	2 episodes
2020–2021	Station 19	Johnny Alvarez	2 episodes

=== Video games ===
Year	Title	Role	Notes
2001	Rocket Power: Extreme Arcade Games	Lars Rodriguez	
2002	Rocket Power: Beach Bandits	Lars Rodriguez	
2004	The Chronicles of Riddick: Escape from Butcher Bay	Theo / Alonzo / Barassa	
2006	Happy Feet	Raul	
2008	Turok	Gonzales	
2011	Rango	Lupe	
2011	Call of Juarez: The Cartel	Flaco, Additional voices	
