= I Hate My 30's =

American 2007 sitcom

- Created by: Brice Beckham; David Fickas
- Starring: Megahn Perry; Liam Sullivan
- Composer: Kenn Michael
- Country of origin: United States
- Original language: English
- No. of seasons: 1
- No. of episodes: 8

Production
- Executive producers: Brice Beckham; David Fickas; Josh Uranga
- Camera setup: Single-camera
- Running time: 30 minutes (including commercials)
- Production company: Drama 3/4 Productions

Original release
- Network: VH1
- Release: July 26 – September 13, 2007

I Hate My 30's is an American television sitcom that lasted for one season aired on VH1 from July 26 until September 13, 2007.

== Plot ==
It focuses on a cast of characters in their 30s who work together in a nondescript office environment. A common theme is the grudging realization by the characters that they are well into adulthood and need to grow up. Dr. Rod (Ric Barbera) guides each episode, presenting a common issue or obstacle facing these frustrated folks and providing commentary.

== Cast and characters ==
=== Main ===
- Megahn Perry is Carol, a woman who just turned 30 and is dealing with the many stages of turning 30. She also has feelings for her co-worker, Chad, but believes that if she pursues them it would complicate her career. Her best friends are Vicki, Mandy, and her grandmother (who is never shown, but Carol is often seen talking on the phone with her).
- Liam Sullivan is Kyle, who works in the mailroom at Carol's job, and is somewhat dimwitted. He often doesn't take his job seriously, and throws some letters up in the air or simply forgets about the mail altogether.
- Brice Beckham is Corey, Carol's boss, whose wife, Lori, recently divorced him. He often talks about her rudely, but ends the sentence with "God, I miss her." He is also obsessed with the fictional book series Wizard Larry (a parody of Harry Potter).
- James Mathis III is Bruce, the computer expert at Carol's job. He also is obsessed with his health and weight so he constantly works out. He knows a lot about the fat contents of food and other health details.
- David Fickas is Chad, one of Carol's co-workers who also has feelings for Carol, but knows Carol doesn't want a relationship for the time being. In the episode 'Owe Boy', it's revealed that he does not know how to manage his money. He buys whatever he sees on television, leading to a serious debt problem, which gets resolved when his grandparents die in a buffalo stampede and he inherits 1.2 million dollars.
- Jill Ritchie is Mandy, another one of Carol's co-workers and she is completely self-obsessed. She constantly gloats about how pretty she is. Kyle (see below) has feelings for her, so Mandy often uses Kyle to run her errands.
- Mark Kelly is Travis, a somewhat violent co-worker of Carol's. He has anger-management issues, and often hurts his co-workers (with no feelings of remorse). He also has relationship problems with his son, Bickle, but those end once he finds some things they have in common.
- Michele Specht is Katie, Kyle's crazy roommate. She often shows up at Kyle's job unexpectedly and sneaks up on people. She sometimes stalks her 'friends' and all her 'friends' are afraid of her intensity.
- Rachael Lawrence is Vicki, another one of Carol's co-workers who is in her late 20s. She is constantly late for work, and like to gloat about her young age to make her co-workers feel bad. She is in a band and in the show they play two of her songs, 'the carol of carol's career' and 'I want the 411 on stickbone12'.
- Ric Barbera is Dr. Rod, the narrator of the show and is your guide through the lives of the main characters. In the beginning of every episode he tells you about a stage of your 30s which helps you grasp what's going to happen in the episode. He also owns the coffee shop, a jewelry shop and a pizza shop/pharmacy.
- Alex Fox is C.L. Fox, which is short for Crazy Lyca Fox, hosts the ending skit, 'the safety place with C.L. Fox, by giving the main characters advice on how to stay out of trouble based on personal experiences.

=== Recurring ===
- Pam Cook is The Intern

== Episodes ==
All episodes of the series were written and directed by Brice Beckham & David Fickas.

| No. | Title | Original release date |
|---|---|---|
| 1 | "I Have to Go #30" | July 26, 2007 |
| 2 | "Always a Bridesmaid to Order" | August 2, 2007 |
| 3 | "Try to Understand... He's a Magic Man" | August 9, 2007 |
| 4 | "Daydream Bereaver" | August 16, 2007 |
| 5 | "Owe Boy" | August 23, 2007 |
| 6 | "Out of Cervix" | August 30, 2007 |
| 7 | "Promotion Commotion, What's Your Notion?" | September 6, 2007 |
| 8 | "Between a Rock and a Cyberspace" | September 13, 2007 |
