= The Gravedancers =

- Theatrical release poster
- Directed by: Mike Mendez
- Written by: Brad Keene; Chris Skinner
- Produced by: Al Corley; Lawrence Elmer Fuhrmann Jr. Bill McCutcheon; Eugene Musso; Bart Rosenblatt
- Starring: Dominic Purcell; Josie Maran; Clare Kramer; Marcus Thomas; Megahn Perry; Tchéky Karyo
- Cinematography: David A. Armstrong
- Edited by: Mike Mendez
- Music by: Joseph Bishara
- Production company: Code Entertainment
- Distributed by: After Dark Films; Freestyle Releasing
- Release dates: July 15, 2006 (Fantasia Film Festival); November 17, 2006 (United States)
- Running time: 95 minutes
- Country: United States
- Language: English

The Gravedancers is a 2006 American horror film directed by Mike Mendez. It was chosen as one of the 8 Films To Die For in 2006 and screened at that year's After Dark Horrorfest film festival.

== Plot ==
An unidentified young woman, alone in a room, is attacked by an invisible assailant, who hangs her in the stairway of her house. As she dies, she drops an ornate black envelope.

A year later, former college friends Sid, Kira, and Harris go out drinking after a funeral. They break into the Crescent View Cemetery to say their final goodbyes to the departed. Continuing their revelries, they get quite drunk. Sid finds a black envelope tucked behind a garland of flowers at the grave. It contains a poem urging those present to be joyful and to dance upon the graves. In their drunken state, the three regard this as a celebration of life, and they dance.

Afterward, mysterious things happen. Harris and his wife Allison are frightened by unexpected visions and odd sounds. Then Kira is attacked by a demonic force. She is severely bitten and sexually assaulted, and her house is ransacked. Sid is plagued by unexpected fires. They enlist a pair of paranormal investigators, Vincent Cochet and Frances Culpepper, who determine that the three friends inadvertently invoked a powerful curse by dancing on the graves. They are now being haunted by three wayward spirits—a passionate axe murderer, a child pyromaniac, and a serial killer and rapist—who will kill them at the next full moon.

As the full moon approaches, they return to the cemetery to disinter the remains of their tormenters, hoping to bury them anew and put the curse to rest. Not all of the critical parts make it back into the ground, however, and on the final night, the three friends experience renewed attacks, more powerful and furious than any previously. They are trapped together with the investigators by the malevolent spirits. Sid is incinerated by his firebug ghost, and Kira is murdered, and her body is possessed by the axe murderer who is pursuing Harris.

Under duress, Culpepper admits that she foiled the burial plan by hiding the skulls of the corpses, the better to gather hard evidence of ghostly activity. Culpepper is then killed with an axe to the chest. Harris takes the axe murderer's skull and tries to return it to its body to break the curse. He helps Allison escape the house through an attic window.

The spiritual force in the house coalesces into the form of a demonic head. Smashing through the walls and out of the house, it pursues their fleeing vehicle. Barely eluding the head, Allison and Harris return the skull to its corpse, and the raging spirits disappear.

Later, Allison and Harris walk through the cemetery following their friends' funerals. As they leave, the groundskeeper carefully places an ornate black envelope on one of the tombstones.

== Cast ==
- Dominic Purcell as Harris Mckay
- Clare Kramer as Allison Mitchell
- Josie Maran as Kira Hayden
- Marcus Thomas as Sid Vance
- Tchéky Karyo as Vincent Cochet
- Megahn Perry as Frances Culpepper

== Production ==
Production on the film began in North Carolina during the winter, and lasted six weeks. After numerous false starts and shifting studios, director Mike Mendez opted to finance the film independently, leaving a six-year gap in between his first film, The Convent, and The Gravedancers.

== Release ==
The Gravedancers debuted at the Fantasia Film Festival on July 15, 2006. It was officially released on November 17, 2006, by After Dark Films and Freestyle Releasing as a part of the 8 Films to Die For series.

=== Versions ===
The film was distributed on DVD by Lionsgate on March 27, 2007.

== Reception ==
On review aggregator Rotten Tomatoes, The Gravedancers holds an approval rating of 100% based on 7 reviews, with an average rating of 7.10/10. A review wrote, ”It's not quite clear why the film decided to weave three separate tones into the narrative, but the strange transitions do prove both jarring and occasionally refreshing.”

== See also ==
- List of ghost films
