= Jill Ritchie =

American actress (born 1974)

- Born: Jill Susanne Ritchie; March 5, 1974 (age 52); Romeo, Michigan, U.S.
- Other name: Jill Haas
- Occupation: Actress
- Years active: 1995–2007
- Spouse: Bradley Haas (m. 2006)
- Children: 2
- Relatives: Kid Rock (brother)

Jill Susanne Ritchie (born March 5, 1974) is an American former actress.

== Early life ==
Ritchie was born on March 5, 1974, in Romeo, Michigan, the daughter of Susan (née Brabbs) and William Ritchie (1941–2024), who owned multiple car dealerships. She was raised in her father's large home on extensive property, which included an orchard and a barnyard for their horses. She is the younger sister of musician Kid Rock. Ritchie attended DePaul University's Theatre School before transferring to University of Southern California where she graduated with a B.A. in theatre.

== Career ==
Ritchie starred in the 2004 film D.E.B.S., portraying the role of Janet. Ritchie also portrayed the role of Amy In Breakin' All the Rules with Jamie Foxx as well as a guest role as Bluth family publicist Jessie in an episode of Arrested Development. She co-starred in the VH1 series I Hate My 30's as Mandy. She is friends with Liam Kyle Sullivan and she also appeared in his video "Let Me Borrow That Top" as Katelyn (the girl Kelly wants the top from and who was homecoming queen). Ritchie also appeared in the 2005 Disney movie Herbie: Fully Loaded as Charisma alongside actors Lindsay Lohan, Michael Keaton, and Justin Long.

== Personal life ==
Ritchie married Bradley Haas in May 2006; they have two daughters, born in 2008 and 2010.

== Filmography ==
=== Film ===
Year	Title	Role	Notes
1998	Best of the Best 4: Without Warning	Mickey	Video
2000	Ready to Rumble	Brittany	
2000	Face the Music	Eden	
2001	Perfect Fit	Daisy	
2001	Surfacing: AKA A Letter from My Father	Shelby	
2002	100 Women	Actress	AKA, Girl Fever
2003	D.E.B.S.	Janet	Short
2004	D.E.B.S.	Janet	
2004	Seeing Other People	Sandy	
2004	Breakin' All the Rules	Amy	
2005	Herbie: Fully Loaded	Charisma	
2005	Little Athens	Jessica	
2006	Southland Tales	Shoshana Kapowski / Shoshana Cox	

=== Television ===
Year	Title	Role	Notes
1995	Beverly Hills, 90210	Nose Ring Girl	Episode: "Everything's Coming Up Roses"
1997	Dangerous Minds	Megan	Episode: "Everybody Wants It"
1997	Pacific Palisades	Teenager	Episode: "Private Showing"
1997	Teen Angel	Cheerleader	Episode: "Marty Buys the Farm"
1997	USA High	Heather	Episode: "West Point"
2000	Chicken Soup for the Soul	Liz	Episode: "The Right Thing"
2000	Jack & Jill	Roxanne	Episode: "Under Pressure"
2000	Boston Public	Karen Fitzgerald	Episode: "Chapter 6"
2000	Nash Bridges	Vickie, Glenda	Episodes: "Line of Sight", "End Game"
2001	Nash Bridges	Leia Brooks	Episode: "Cat Fight"
2001	The Geena Davis Show	Madison	Episode: "The Prime Directive"
2001	Off Centre	Michelle	Episode: "Trust Me or Don't Trust Me"
2001	Men, Women & Dogs	Sam	Episode: "Kibbles & Grits"
2001	Inside Schwartz	Focus Group Girl	Episode: "Bless Me Father, for I Have Fired You"
2002	Nancy Drew	Bess Marvin	TV film
2003	Miss Match	Haley	Episode: "Miss Communication"
2004	Arrested Development	Jessie	Episode: "Public Relations"
2007	The Loop	Jenny	Episode: "Fatty"
2007	I Hate My 30's	Mandy	Main role
2007	Me & Lee?	Jessica	TV film
