= Tales of Halloween =

- Theatrical release poster
- Directed by: Neil Marshall; Darren Lynn Bousman; Axelle Carolyn; Lucky McKee; Andrew Kasch; Paul Solet; John Skipp; Adam Gierasch and Jace Anderson; Mike Mendez; Ryan Schifrin; Dave Parker
- Written by: Axelle Carolyn; Andrew Kasch; Neil Marshall; Lucky McKee; Mike Mendez; Dave Parker; Ryan Schifrin; Clint Sears; John Skipp; Greg Commons
- Produced by: Shaked Berenson; Axelle Carolyn; Tada Chae; Patrick Ewald; Mike Mendez
- Starring: Adrienne Barbeau; Caroline Williams; Madison Iseman; Greg Grunberg; Clare Kramer; Barry Bostwick; Adam Pascal; Alex Essoe; Lin Shaye; Barbara Crampton; Stuart Gordon; Mick Garris; Pollyanna McIntosh; Marc Senter; Grace Phipps; Booboo Stewart; Keir Gilchrist; Noah Segan; James Duval; Dana Gould; Adam Green; Lombardo Boyar; Sam Witwer; John Landis; Jose Pablo Cantillo; Pat Healy; Kristina Klebe; Joe Dante; John Savage
- Cinematography: Jan-Michael Losada; Zoran Popovic; David Tayar; Alex Vendler; Richard J. Vialet; Joseph White; Scott Winig
- Edited by: Matthew Barry; Josh Ethier; Andrew Kasch; Mike Mendez; Vanessa Menendez; Eddie Oswald; Dave Parker; Zach Passero; Brian J. Smith; Sean Tretta
- Music by: Lalo Schifrin (Main title composer); Christopher Drake; Joseph Bishara; Bobby Johnston; Edwin Wendler; Kung Fu Vampire
- Production company: Epic Pictures Group
- Distributed by: Epic Pictures Releasing
- Release dates: July 24, 2015 (Fantasia International Film Festival); October 16, 2015 (North America)
- Running time: 92 minutes
- Country: United States
- Language: English

Tales of Halloween is a 2015 American comedy horror anthology film consisting of ten interlocking segments, each revolving around Halloween. Segments were directed by Neil Marshall, Darren Lynn Bousman, Axelle Carolyn, Lucky McKee, Andrew Kasch, Paul Solet, John Skipp, Adam Gierasch, Jace Anderson, Mike Mendez, Ryan Schifrin and Dave Parker.

The film premiered on July 24, 2015, at the Fantasia International Film Festival, before receiving a limited theatrical release and through video on demand on October 16, 2015, by Epic Pictures.

== Plot ==
=== Sweet Tooth ===
Written and directed by Dave Parker.

Having just finished trick-or-treating, Mikey comes home. His parents have left him in the care of babysitter Lizzy, who has invited her boyfriend Kyle over to watch a horror movie. As Mikey enjoys his candy, Lizzy and Kyle advise him to leave some for "Sweet Tooth". The teens share the urban legend: fifty years ago, Timothy Blake, a boy who loved trick-or-treating but had never been allowed candy by his parents, discovered his parents eating his Halloween haul. Enraged, he killed them with a meat cleaver and ate all the candy. Wanting more, he cut his parents open and ate the candy in their stomachs. Every Halloween since, his spirit roams the neighborhood for candy. Children have to leave some candy to share with Sweet Tooth, or he will rip open their stomachs and take what is inside.

Rattled, Mikey leaves a candy bar by the door before sleeping. Lizzy and Kyle are attacked by Sweet Tooth himself. He spares Mikey after taking the candy bar he left. Mikey's parents come home to find Lizzy and Kyle's corpses and their son exclaiming that they ate all his Halloween candy. It is revealed in "Bad Seed" that Mikey is believed to have murdered Lizzy and Kyle himself and was arrested.

=== The Night Billy Raised Hell ===
Written by Clint Sears, directed by Darren Lynn Bousman.

Billy Thompson, dressed as a red devil and accompanied by his older sister Britney and her boyfriend Todd, tries to begin trick-or-treating early. The two teens trick Billy into throwing an egg at the house of Mr. Abbadon, a stingy resident who has never given out candy over the years. Before Billy can throw the egg, he is caught red-handed by Mr. Abbadon. Billy is ushered into Mr. Abbadon's house, where Mr. Abbadon is revealed to be a demon.

Tired of children pranking his house year after year, he tells Billy that he is going to teach him what a real Halloween prank is. Mr. Abbadon and Billy go around the neighborhood and play twisted "pranks" throughout town, ranging from spray-painting walls to stabbing a dentist neighbor. The duo even hijack Adrianne Curry's car, using it to run down trick or treaters and rob a convenience store. After, Mr. Abbadon returns to his house and greets Billy, who is revealed to have actually been tied up the entire time. The person wearing Billy's devil costume is a miniature demon known as Mordecai.

Satisfied, Mr. Abbadon lets Billy go, only for Billy to be surrounded by police officers for the terror Mordecai caused disguised as him. A terrified Billy pees his pants before the officers shoot him dead.

=== Trick ===
Written by Greg Commons, directed by Adam Gierasch.

On Halloween night, close friends Nelson, Maria, James and Caitlyn are lounging around Nelson's house, smoking pot, giving out candy, and watching Night of the Living Dead. As Nelson goes to greet a trick-or-treater dressed as a witch, the girl suddenly stabs him multiple times in the abdomen. Frightened, Maria tries to drive Nelson to the hospital, only to be grievously attacked by four more kids in costumes. Maria succumbs to her injuries and drops dead in the house's pool. By this time, Nelson has died as well.

James has his face burned by yet another trick-or-treater, who completes their attack by stuffing his mouth with rat poison. Caitlyn, the only adult left, hides in the pool house. It is revealed that Caitlyn, Nelson, Maria and James are actually a group of psychopaths who have been kidnapping kids and torturing them for amusement. The vigilante kids find the pool house, which turns out to be the place the foursome tortured victims with surgical tools. The kids free the group's most recent victim, a girl whose eye was gouged by the adults, who kills Caitlyn with an axe to the head.

=== The Weak and the Wicked ===
Written by Molly Millions, directed by Paul Solet.

Alice, a sociopathic pyromaniac, along with her lackeys, Isaac and Bart, corner a lost trick-or-treater, dressed as a cowboy. They are interrupted by a teenager dressed as some sort of creature. The teen hands Alice a drawing of the creature, referred to as "The Demon of All Hallows Eve", warning that the Demon will "spill the blood of the wicked where the wicked have harmed the weak". The trio chases the teenager and stop by a burnt-down trailer car. In a flashback to when Alice, Bart, and Isaac were children, it is revealed that Alice intentionally set the trailer, which the teenager used to live in, on fire, with his parents inside.

The bullies recognize the teen as Jimmy Henson, before proceeding to beat him up. As Alice prepares to light him on fire, Bart and Isaac are suddenly pulled into the shadows by an unseen force. The actual Demon of All Hallow's Eve shows up, looking exactly like Jimmy's costume (the drawing Alice dropped contained instructions on how to summon it). Alice is brutally killed by the Demon, her blood violently splashing on Jimmy, who smiles in satisfaction.

=== Grim Grinning Ghost ===
Written and directed by Axelle Carolyn.

Lynn attends her mother's Halloween party. She listens as her mother recounts the story of Mary Bailey, a girl who was mocked all her life for her disfigured physical appearance. As a ghost, Mary rises every Halloween to laugh at people's appearances behind their backs and take the eyes of those who turn around to look at her. On her way home, Lynn's old car breaks down in the middle of the road. She accidentally breaks her phone and is forced to finish her trip home on foot. She hears sinister cackling; possibly Mary Bailey's ghost following her.

Terrified, but remembering her mother's story, Lynn runs and manages not to turn around. She reaches home, whereupon she turns around to see nothing. As she settles in to watch a movie, her dog suddenly gets nervous and leaves. Lynn finds Mary Bailey sitting beside her.

=== Ding Dong ===
Written and directed by Lucky McKee.

One year ago, married couple Jack and Bobbie watch as children trick or treat on Halloween night. Bobbie is distraught by the fact she has no children of her own, prompting Jack to try and cheer her up by dressing their dog as Gretel. Suddenly angered at the gesture, Bobbie transforms into her true form, a red-skinned demonic witch with multiple arms, and proceeds to claw Jack's face.

In present day, a submissive Jack and an enthusiastic Bobbie have prepared a routine to perform for trick-or-treaters, dressed as Hansel and the witch from Hansel and Gretel respectively. Even though everything goes normally, with Bobbie performing the skit for the children (including children from the other stories of the film), there is a sense of uneasiness between the couple every time children arrive on their front porch. When a young boy also dressed as Hansel visits the couple's house by himself, Bobbie prepares to lead him inside. Jack alerts the boy's mother of his location and informs Bobbie that he secretly underwent a vasectomy to prevent a pregnancy, believing that his wife is far too abusive and unstable to properly care for a child. Bobbie snaps and transforms back into her witch form. She throws Jack into the oven, which resembles a cavernous inferno. She then begins sobbing and ends up melting and perishing.

=== This Means War ===
Written and directed by Andrew Kasch and John Skipp.

Boris has proudly finished decorating his house for Halloween, setting up a classic graveyard-themed display, complete with an animatronic talking skeleton. When children are about to observe his decorations, they are scared away from the place by blaring rock music. The music is revealed to come from the house of Boris' new neighbor, Dante, a punk rock enthusiast who has set up a far more gruesome and gore-oriented set of decorations on his own house. Boris walks up to Dante's yard to ask him to turn the volume lower and demand that his scantily clad girlfriend put on more clothes, but Dante and his friends refuse to comply. Dante also describes Boris' display "cute." An angered Boris charges into a shed on Dante's property to cut power from the sound system. Dante declares, "Of course you know, this means war," and uses a baseball bat to knock the head off of Boris' talking skeleton. Dante prepares to dump a bucket of fake blood on the rest of Boris' decorations, but Boris charges him and ends up covered in the fake blood instead. They engage in a fistfight, and spectators (including characters from the other stories in the film) cheer, place bets, and egg them on until the police arrive. Eventually, Boris shoves Dante towards a sharp piece of standing wood left over from the wrecked decorations. In the end, both Boris and Dante are impaled on the piece of wood, killing them both and shocking the crowd.

=== Friday the 31st ===
Written by Mike Mendez and Dave Parker, directed by Mike Mendez.

Deep in the woods, a deformed serial killer who resembles Jason Voorhees hunts down a teenage girl dressed as Dorothy Gale for Halloween. The girl runs to a barn where she discovers several of the killer's dismembered victims, among them her friend Casey. The killer tracks her to the barn, and when she manages to escape and flee, he kills her by throwing a spear through her chest. As the killer celebrates his most recent slaying, a UFO suddenly appears overhead. The ship beams down a small, costumed alien that tries to trick-or-treat. Unable to persuade the constantly repeating alien that he has no candy to give, the frustrated killer proceeds to stomp on the alien, seemingly crushing him. As the killer walks back to his barn, the alien's remains slither into the girl's mouth and possess her body. The possessed girl proceeds to chase the frightened killer into his barn. From there, the possessed girl and the killer then proceed to attack each other with a meat cleaver and a chainsaw, respectively. Their duel eventually concludes with both of them decapitating each other. The alien then crawls out of the girl's severed head through the mouth and teleports back to the spaceship, taking the killer's head with him as his "treat".

=== The Ransom of Rusty Rex ===
Written and directed by Ryan Schifrin.

Bank robber Hank and his partner Dutch, lounging in their van, spot millionaire Jebediah Rex letting his son Rusty go out for trick-or-treating. Seeing this, the two set out on a plan to kidnap the millionaire's son and hold him for ransom. After succeeding in capturing Rusty, the kidnappers tie him into a chair and call his father. However, Jebediah seems not to express fear about the fact that his son has been kidnapped, tells the kidnappers that they have made a terrible mistake, and promptly hangs up the phone. Hank calls him again in an attempt to discuss the ransom, but Jebediah coldly tells them they can have his son. Exasperated, the kidnappers eventually find out that Rusty is actually a malicious, cat-like imp that clings to the people near him. After the criminals engage in a vicious fight with Rusty, they capture him, tie him up, and prepare to throw him in a nearby swamp. Dutch is briefly fooled when Rusty begins emitting the cries of a child, only for the imp to spew bile at his face when he checks on him. After returning to their lair, Hank and Dutch discover that Rusty has followed them. As Rusty attacks Dutch, Hank calls Jebediah once more, who informs him that Rusty is not his son. He came to Jebediah's doorstep five years ago disguised as a trick-or-treater and has been holding Jebediah and his wife hostage ever since. Thanking the kidnappers for freeing him from Rusty, Jebediah warns them to remember to feed Rusty, otherwise "he will eat". Hank and Dutch once again tie up Rusty, and this time, they deliver him to Jebediah's doorstep and set him on fire. Sometime later, as Hank comes back from buying food from a convenience store (the same one featured earlier), he finds Rusty in the backseat, feasting on Dutch's severed head.

=== Bad Seed ===
Written and directed by Neil Marshall.

Ray is seen carving pumpkins in his kitchen as his wife Ellen appreciates his work. When she leaves the room and comes back in, changed into her cat costume, she watches as the latest pumpkin her husband carved suddenly comes to life and bites his head off, before growing spider-like roots for legs and fleeing out the back door. Detective McNally is called in to investigate the crime scene (as most of the police department are busy dealing with the emergencies portrayed earlier in the film). At first, she refuses to believe the description of the victim's killer, but is proven wrong after forensic analyst Bob confirms the killer was indeed a carved pumpkin. Meanwhile, the pumpkin proceeds to disguise itself among the jack o' lanterns on a nearby porch, where it eats a trick-or-treater. At the police station, McNally meets with her superior, Captain J.G. Zimmerman, to discuss the situation. After mentioning that the town goes crazy every Halloween (showcasing reports describing incidents from earlier in the film), Zimmerman assigns McNally to track down the pumpkin before it can do any more damage. While driving, McNally finally discovers the pumpkin as it terrorizes the neighborhood. McNally manages to track it down to a backyard, where it disguises itself among several other pumpkins. When it discovers McNally, the pumpkin attempts to move in for the kill. When McNally runs out of bullets, Bob arrives and tosses McNally a shotgun, allowing her to destroy it. McNally finds a sticker on a broken piece of the pumpkin, revealing that it comes from a company known as Clover Corp, advertised as a "100% organic super-pumpkin". McNally and Bob visit the Clover Corp. headquarters and meet with professor Milo Gottlieb with a search warrant. Gottlieb takes them to a warehouse where they discover thousands of genetically modified pumpkins; all potentially dangerous, all waiting to be sold.

== Cast ==
=== Wraparound ===
- Adrienne Barbeau as D.J.

Sweet Tooth:

- Hunter Smith as "Sweet Tooth"
- Cameron Easton as Timothy Blake
- Caroline Williams as Mrs. Blake
- Robert Rusler as Mr. Blake
- Clare Kramer as Lieutenant Karly Brandt-Mathis
- Greg Grunberg as Alex Mathis
- Austin Falk as Kyle
- Madison Iseman as Lizzy
- Daniel DiMaggio as Mikey

The Night Billy Raised Hell:

- Barry Bostwick as Mr. Abbadon
- Marcus Eckert as Billy Thompson
- Christophe Zajac-Denek as Mordecai / Little Devil
- Ben Stillwell as Todd
- Natalis Castillo as Britney Thompson
- Adam Pascal as The Dentist
- Adrianne Curry as Herself
- Rafael Jordan as Alien

Trick:

- John F. Beach as James
- Tiffany Shepis as Maria
- Casey Ruggieri as Catilyn
- Trent Haaga as Nelson
- Marnie McKendry as Princess
- Rebekah McKendry as Mother
- Mia Page as Girl / Witch
- Clayton Keller as Alien
- Sage Stewart as Devil Girl

The Weak and the Wicked:

- Keir Gilchrist as Jimmy Henson
  - Jack Dylan Grazer as Young Jimmy Henson
- Grace Phipps as Alice
  - Katie Silverman as Young Alice
- Booboo Stewart as Isaac
- Noah Segan as Bart
- Matt Merchant as Demon

Grim Grinning Ghost:

- Alex Essoe as Lynn / Victorian Woman
- Lin Shaye as Lynn's Mother / Pirate
- Liesel Hanson as Mary Bailey
- Barbara Crampton as Witch
- Lisa Marie as Victorian Widow
- Mick Garris as Erik
- Stuart Gordon as Sherlock Holmes
- Anubis as Baby

Ding Dong:

- Marc Senter as Jack
- Pollyanna McIntosh as Bobbie
- Lily Von Woodenshoe as Gretel
- Vanessa Menendez as Lone Child's Mother
- Lucas Armandaris as Lone Child
- Daniel DiMaggio as Mikey
- Mia Page as Girl / Witch
- Sage Stewart as Devil Girl
- Ben Woolf as Rusty Rex
- Aidan Gail as Child Fireman
- Mo Meinhart as Witch
- Gavin Keathley as Child Jake Gyllenhaal
- Felissa Rose as Parent

This Means War:

- Dana Gould as Boris
- James Duval as Dante
- Elissa Dowling as Velma
- Graham Denman as "Ziggy"
- Thomas Blake Jr. as Axl
- Sean Clark as Tytan
- Buz Wallick as Danzy
- Joshua Lou Friedman as Butch
- Jennifer Wenger as Vicki
- Michael Monterastelli as Goober
- Graham Skipper as Officer Hellman
- Adam Green as Officer Carlo
- Lombardo Boyar as Gambling Neighbor
- Cody Goodfellow as Drunken Neighbor
- Frank Blocker as Judge Moustache
- Andy Merrill as Neighbor
- Frank Dietz as Neighbor
- Noel Jason Scott as Nosferatu
- Shaked Berenson as Detective / Masked Wrestler

Friday the 31st:

- Amanda Moyer as Dorothy
  - Jennifer Wenger as Possessed Dorothy
- Nick Principe as The Killer

The Ransom of Rusty Rex:

- John Landis as Jebediah Rex
- Ben Woolf as Rusty Rex
- Jose Pablo Cantillo as "Dutch"
- Sam Witwer as Hank

Bad Seed:

- Kristina Klebe as Detective McNally
- Pat Healy as Bob "Forensic Bob"
- Greg McLean as Ray Bishop
- Cerina Vincent as Ellen Bishop
- John Savage as Captain J.G. Zimmerman
- Dana Renee Ashmore as Coroner #1
- Dylan Struzan as Coroner #2
- Drew Struzan as "Rembrandt"
- Nicole Laino as Cheryl
- Aidan Gail as Kevin
- Graham Skipper as Officer Hellman
- Adam Green as Officer Carlo
- Monette Moio as Cheerleader Girl
- Noah Nevins as Cheerleader's Boyfriend
- Joe Dante as Professor Milo Gottleib
- Alexandra Fritz as Pirate

== Production ==
Tales of Halloween was conceived by filmmaker Axelle Carolyn, who garnered a slew of directors to make a Halloween-centric film taking place in the "same town on the same night". Carolyn was at a birthday party when she pitched the film to Adam Gierasch and Andrew Kasch. Kasch would then bring along his collaborator John Skipp to work with him on "This Means War". Mike Mendez, director of The Convent, signed onto the film a month later and helped secure a deal with Epic Pictures Group. Joe Begos was brought onto the project and wrote a script, but would drop out to direct The Mind's Eye. Begos was replaced by Lucky McKee, who was flown out to Los Angeles to direct his segment. Mendez's short, "Friday the 31st", was actually the opening to a film he co-wrote with Dave Parker 18 years prior, called Dead Stuff. Darren Lynn Bousman used a script from his colleague Clint Sears and reassembled his crew from The Devil's Carnival. Gierasch, writer of films Mortuary and Crocodile, first pitched a romantic short which would be rejected by Carolyn. For Ryan Schifrin's short, "The Ransom of Rusty Rex", actor John Landis had assisted Schifrin after editing was completed by giving notes. Bousman and Neil Marshall shot their segments in the matter of two days.

Greg Grunberg and Clare Kramer reprise their characters from Big Ass Spider!.

== Release ==
The film had its premiere at the Fantasia International Film Festival in Montreal on July 24, 2015. It was also selected as the opening-night film at Wizard World Chicago as well as London FrightFest Film Festival, where it closed the annual event on August 31, 2015, tying with its European premiere. The film was released in a limited release and through video on demand on October 16, 2015.

== Reception ==
Tales of Halloween has an approval rating of 77% on review aggregator website Rotten Tomatoes, based on 52 reviews, and an average rating of 6.7/10. The site's consensus reads, "Tales Of Halloween boasts a number of fun scares and is overall more consistent than many horror anthology films, even if it isn't quite as dark or nasty as the classics of the genre." Metacritic assigned the film a weighted average score of 64 out of 100, based on 5 critics, indicating "generally favorable reviews".

Michael Gingold, writing for Fangoria, called it "Well-produced on its modest budget", and gave it three and a half out of four skulls. Kalyn Corrigan of Bloody Disgusting called it "a fun, exuberant addition to the subgenre of horror anthology films." Katie Rife of The A.V. Club gave it a "B" saying the film "might make it a new annual tradition in horror-loving households." Rob Hunter of Film School Rejects wrote "Tales of Halloween is good fun, but it’s difficult not to wish that more of the stories had aimed for darker, more terrifying and affecting goals. Still, the EC Comics attitude finds a new home with Carolyn and her crew, and with any luck the film will spawn a new Halloween tradition of fun, gory, spooky anthology films highlighted by short, messy bursts of genre talent."

Dennis Harvey of Variety gave the film a mixed review, calling the segments "polished enough but utterly routine" and saying "Even the best of these, however, are held back by brevity from developing silly ideas into anything truly memorable."

== See also ==
- List of films set around Halloween
