= Andrew Kasch =

American film director and editor

- Born: Tallahassee, Florida, U.S.
- Occupation(s): Director, editor, producer

Andrew Kasch is an American film director and editor.

== Life and career ==
Born and raised in the South, Kasch had a lifelong obsession with sci-fi, horror and fantasy and went on to study film at the Savannah College of Art & Design where he graduated in 2013.

Shortly after his arrival in Los Angeles, he directed and edited the short horror-comedy Thirsty, starring Joe Lynch (director) and Tiffany Shepis. The film became a cult hit on the festival circuit for several years before it was acquired by Fearnet.

In 2009, Kasch was hired to edit bonus content for the horror franchise documentary His Name Was Jason: 30 Years of Friday the 13th. After a turbulent production, Kasch and director Daniel Farrands broke off and worked for several years making documentaries for DVD/Blu-ray releases of several horror films, including the Friday the 13th series for Paramount and The Haunting in Connecticut for Lionsgate. In 2010, the duo independently directed the 4-hour Freddy Krueger/New Line Cinema documentary Never Sleep Again: The Elm Street Legacy which won several awards and is widely regarded as one of the best film documentaries ever made. He continued to work on bonus material for home video releases, including catalog titles from Scream Factory. He went on to edit and/or produced documentaries for over 40 genre films, including the Halloween and Star Trek franchises, Scream, Evil Dead 2, Day of the Dead, and Phantasm II.

Following the release of Never Sleep Again, Kasch formed a directing team with horror writer and filmmaker John Skipp. Their first project was the award-winning festival short Stay At Home Dad followed by the horror anthology film Tales of Halloween, ("This Means War") which stars Dana Gould and James Duval in the leading roles.

Kasch worked as a television editor for Mike Judge's 2012 revival of Beavis & Butthead before joining Berlanti Productions, serving as editor for the DC Extended Universe shows. Credits include The Flash, Legends of Tomorrow, Black Lightning and Titans. He has also directed episodes of Legends of Tomorrow.

== Selected filmography ==
=== Director ===
- DC's Legends of Tomorrow (2019)
- Monsterland (2016) - (Wrap-around segments)
- Tales of Halloween (2015)
- Hot Rod Worm - The Slow Poisoner (2014) (Music video)
- Stay At Home Dad (2012) (Short film)
- Never Sleep Again: The Elm Street Legacy (2010) - Won — Saturn Award for Best DVD Release
- Thirsty (2009) (Short film)

=== Editor ===
- Legends of Tomorrow
- Titans
- The Flash
- Black Lightning
- Crystal Lake Memories: The Complete History of Friday the 13th (2013)
- Stay At Home Dad (2012) (Short film)
- Beavis & Butthead (2011)
- Never Sleep Again: The Elm Street Legacy (2010)
- Thirsty (2009) (Short film)

=== Actor ===
- His Name Was Jason: 30 Years of Friday the 13th (2009) - Himself
