= Brice Beckham =

American actor (b. 1976)

- Born: James Brice Beckham; February 11, 1976 (age 50); Long Beach, California, U.S.
- Education: University of Southern California
- Occupations: Actor; producer; writer
- Years active: 1984–1993; 2001–present
- Known for: Wesley T. Owens in Mr. Belvedere

James Brice Beckham (born February 11, 1976) is an American actor most famous for his role as Wesley T. Owens in the television sitcom Mr. Belvedere and for his role as Corey in I Hate My 30's. He lives in Los Angeles and is a member of LA's Namaste theater group.

== Early years and education ==
Born on February 11, 1976 in Long Beach, California, Beckham attended Minnie Gant Elementary School, College Intermediate School, Walter B. Hill Junior High School, and Wilson High School, in Long Beach, California. While in high school, he came in first place in the California High School Speech State Finals in 1993. He attended the University of Southern California, majoring in theater.

== Acting career ==
Beckham began his acting career in school plays. He later went on to do an assortment of radio commercials, and would later appear on an episode of the TV sitcom Alice. He starred in Mr. Belvedere as Wesley T. Owens. The show aired from 1985 to 1990. He appeared in an episode of Win, Lose, or Draw in 1989, and in a guest role in American Dreamer in 1991. In 1992, he starred in an episode of CBS Schoolbreak Special, called "Two Teens and a Baby".

In 2007, he starred in the VH1 series I Hate My 30s. In 2012, Beckham was one of several former child actors who appeared in a Funny or Die video called "CCOKC", which stood for Child Celebrities Opposing Kirk Cameron. A counterpoint to Cameron's stance on homosexuality, the humorous video aimed to spread the message that gay individuals are not a threat to anyone. Keith Coogan, Josie Davis, Jeremy Licht, Kenn Michael, Christine Lakin, and Maureen Flannigan also appeared in the video.

== Radio and podcast appearances ==
Beckham appeared on Ken Reid's TV Guidance Counselor podcast on March 22, 2017.

== Filmography ==
Year	Film	Role	Notes
1984	Alice	Howie	TV episode – "Big Bad Mel"
1985–1990	Mr. Belvedere	Wesley T. Owens	Appeared in all 117 episodes.
1988	Scrabble	Himself	TV episode – "Celebrity Teen Week"
1991	American Dreamer	Nelson	TV episodes – "Don't Drink the Water", "Papa Joe", "They Shoot Ducks, Don't They?"
1991	The Wonder Years	Nick	TV episode – "Soccer"
1992	CBS Schoolbreak Special	Chris Lance	TV episode – "Two Teens and a Baby"
1993	Roseanne	Lunch Box Customer	TV episode – "Crime and Punishment"
2001	Silent Story		
2003	Behind the Mask	Greg Black	
2004	Deliverance: The Musical		
2005	The Confession	Guard	
2006	Shark Bait	Green Gossiping Fish/Cynical Shark	Voiceover.
2007	I Hate My 30's	Corey	VH1 scripted comedy series. Appeared in all 8 episodes.
2009	Burn Notice	Jeremy	TV episode – "Bad Breaks"
2009	Buttf**ker	Mr. Wyler	
2011	L.A. Noire	David Parker	(video game voiceover)
