= Megahn Perry =

American actress (born 1977)

- Occupation: Actress
- Years active: 1997–present
- Known for: Buffy the Vampire Slayer, The Convent, The Perfect Host

Megahn Perry is an American actress.

== Career ==
Perry appeared in Buffy the Vampire Slayer in season two, episode fifteen ("Phases") as Theresa Klusmeyer, a girl who is later turned into a vampire. She also had a guest star appearance on Dawson's Creek. She starred in the short-lived VH1 series I Hate My 30's, as Carol, someone who just started her 30s.

In 2006, she had a supporting role in the supernatural horrorfest film The Gravedancers. She played paranormal investigator Frances Culpepper. It was chosen as one of the 8 Films To Die For in 2006 and screened at that year's After Dark Horrorfest film festival. It's received positive reviews.

She starred in the film Silent Story as Rose and was in Liam Kyle Sullivan's Text Message Breakup and No Booty Calls videos as Kelly's gothic, vampire friend Heather.

Perry was featured in the 2010 thriller The Perfect Host, starring David Hyde Pierce.

== Heather's Vlog ==
Perry starred in a YouTube web series under the channel LiamKyleSullivan. She portrays "Heather the Vampire". Based on the release dates of the videos, she was originally active from 2008 to 2012 but made cameo appearances in 2020 and 2021.
