= Boltneck =

2000 American film

- Directed by: Mitch Marcus
- Written by: Dave Payne
- Produced by: Paul Colichman; Mark R. Harris
- Starring: Matthew Lawrence; Justin Walker; Christine Lakin; Christian Payne; Shelley Duvall; Richard Moll; Charles Fleischer; Kenny Blank; Bianca Lawson; Ryan Reynolds
- Cinematography: Russ Brandt
- Edited by: Stan Cole; Daniel H. Holland
- Music by: Roger Neill
- Distributed by: Pioneer Entertainment; Regent Entertainment
- Release date: 17 October 2000 (video premiere)
- Running time: 92 minutes
- Country: United States
- Language: English

Boltneck (also released as Big Monster on Campus and Teen Monster) is a 2000 American teen comedy horror film directed by Mitch Marcus and starring Matthew Lawrence, Ryan Reynolds, Justin Walker, and Christine Lakin. The film is a modern film adaptation of the classic Mary Shelley novel Frankenstein. Matthew Lawrence plays high-schooler Frank Stein who reanimates a fellow student using the brain of a criminal by mistake. The film was released straight-to-video.

== Plot ==
Los Angeles. Frank is a high school student obsessed with heavy electron resurrection (reanimating corpses soon after death). One night Frank’s neighbor and fellow student Lance throws a party and as a joke invites Karl, an outsider in school. When Karl shows up, however, he gets into a fight with Lance and Tuttle and dies after falling into an empty swimming pool. Frank sees Lance and Tuttle attempting to dump the body and offers to reanimate the corpse for them. Stealing a brain from his father’s lab, Frank successfully resurrects Karl and returns him home.

The next day Frank is befriended by Lance and Tuttle, and Karl appears to be changed into a cool kid in school. Frank, suspicious of Karl’s personality change, discovers that the brain he used was that of a murderer named Skeeter Wayne Dobbs. Revealing this to Karl, Karl and Frank agree to keep this a secret from the others. Karl then helps Frank to get a date with his crush Macy by throwing a party using money stolen from the homecoming dance. At the dance Karl beats up Lance and Tuttle and leaves with Andrea who soon goes missing. Realizing Karl has stolen the homecoming money and potentially murdered Andrea, Frank confronts Karl, who dismisses his concerns and invites him to a Halloween party that night. Macy, thinking Frank stole the money, breaks up with him and goes to the party alone.

At the party Karl accosts Macy who runs to the backyard and discovers that Andrea was not murdered, but rather had been secretly getting breast implants. Lance, Tuttle, and Frank fight with Karl, who attempts to murder Tuttle, but fails. Karl then chases Frank upstairs, but is ambushed and incapacitated. Frank then removes the evil brain using a prop guillotine at the party. Transporting Karl’s corpse back to the laboratory, his father helps him reanimate Karl using his original brain. The next day the homecoming money is returned to school, Karl has his original personality restored, and Frank makes up with Macy.

== Cast ==
- Matthew Lawrence as Frank Stein
- Ryan Reynolds as Karl O'Reilly
- Justin Walker as Lance Kipple
- Christian Payne as Tuttle
- Christine Lakin as Macy
- Shelley Duvall as Mrs. Stein
- Richard Moll as Mr. O'Reilly
- Charles Fleischer as Mr. Stockton
- Kenny Blank as Jordy
- Bianca Lawson as Darien Stompanato
- Judge Reinhold as Mr. Stein
- Nicole Nieth as Andrea Shrelonzky
- Brad Lesley as Arnie
- Eric Siegel as Officer Scott
- Richard Speight Jr. as Comic Book Salesman

== Reception ==
A review by Horror Society gave the film a 3 out of 5.

== In popular culture ==
In a 2018 advertising campaign for Deadpool 2 featuring David Beckham, Ryan Reynolds (dressed as Deadpool) is seen apologizing for Reynolds' critical and commercial flops, including Green Lantern, R.I.P.D., Self/less and Blade: Trinity. When Beckham attempts to add Boltneck to this list, Deadpool is offended, proclaiming it "a masterpiece".
