= P.S. Your Cat Is Dead =

1972 novel by James Kirkwood Jr

P.S. Your Cat is Dead
- Author: James Kirkwood Jr.
- Language: English
- Publisher: Stein and Day
- Publication date: 1972
- Media type: Print (Hardback)
- Pages: 223 pages
- ISBN: 978-0446829342

P.S. Your Cat Is Dead is a novel by James Kirkwood Jr., originally published in 1972, adapted from his play. The book and play later were adapted to film in 2002.

== Synopsis ==
Abandoned by his girlfriend on New Year's Eve, and still unaware that his beloved cat Bobby Seale has died in an animal clinic, hopeless New York actor Jimmy Zoole is feeling depressed and unstable when he happens across a cat burglar named Vito in his apartment. Furious, he beats the stranger unconscious and ties him to his kitchen sink. Jimmy begins to torment his terrified captive; however, the unlikely pair soon establish a bond. Vito once had a wife whom he left when she refused to sleep with him after becoming a strict Catholic. Jimmy questions his own sexual orientation as his relationship with Vito takes on an erotic dimension, and they part amicably.Vito returns having decided to exact revenge on a rich dealer who promised yet never delivered a tombstone for his employee/Vito’s best friend, Jitters. In the end, Jimmy and Vito, now working as a team, sell a stash of the dealer’s stolen drugs and run away together.

== Genesis ==
In his James Kirkwood biography Ponies & Rainbows, Sean Egan traces the genesis of the play, which had its roots in a series of burglaries at Kirkwood's apartment on West 58th Street in New York. The book also features a photograph of Gino Marino, a friend and lover of Kirkwood's upon whom Egan claims the author based the character Vito.

== 1975 Broadway production ==
After five previews, the Broadway production, directed by Vivian Matalon, opened on April 7, 1975, at the John Golden Theatre, where it ran for 16 performances. The cast included Keir Dullea as Jimmy, Tony Musante as Vito, and Jennifer Warren as Kate.

After rewrites in the early summer of 1975, the play opened at the Montgomery Playhouse in San Francisco that July with Robert Foxworth as Jimmy and Jeff Druce as Vito. Actor and LGBTQ activist Sal Mineo played Vito from November 1975 to January 1976. He was preparing for the Los Angeles run in February 1976, but he was murdered at his West Hollywood apartment on February 12 by a drug addict, a week before it was slated to open. The play opened at the Westwood Playhouse in Los Angeles on February 22 with Keir Dullea returning as Jimmy and Jeff Druce reprising his role of Vito at the last minute.

During his acceptance speech for the Tony Award that he received for A Chorus Line on April 16, 1976, Kirkwood stated the following: "As A Chorus Line was previewing at the Newman Theater, I had a little ditty open on Broadway about a month before called P.S. Your Cat Is Dead. It was greeted by some of the critics as if I'd dramatized the Black Plague. It's been rewritten. It's got a whole new life on the coast, so it's alive and well."

The play opened off-Broadway in March 1978 at the Promenade. By July of that year, it had moved to Circle in the Square Theatre.

== Mexican play ==
In Mexico, this play first was produced in 1983 under the title "P.D. Tu gato ha muerto" and starred Manuel Ojeda as Jimmy and Humberto Zurita as Eddie. It was produced from 1997 to 2000 and starred Otto Sirgo in the role of Jimmy. The role of Eddie throughout the years went to Héctor Soberón, Juan Soler, Xavier Ortiz, Héctor Suarez Gomiz, Jorge Poza and Sebastián Rulli. The play was presented in several cities of the United States when Juan Soler was part of the cast.

== 2002 film ==
In 2002, Steve Guttenberg combined the play and novel into the feature film P.S. Your Cat Is Dead, which he co-wrote with Jeff Korn and directed, starring himself as the writer, Cynthia Watros as his ex-girlfriend Kate, and Lombardo Boyar as the youthful burglar Eddie. It was screened at the 2002 Philadelphia International Gay and Lesbian Film Festival.

== Brazilian play ==
In 2004, the play was produced in São Paulo, with the title P.S.: Seu Gato Morreu, directed by Jarbas Homem de Mello, and had Teco Tavares - who also produced and translated the play to Portuguese - in the role of Jimmy Zoole and Paula Picarelli as Kate. The roles of Vito and Fred were played by Luís Araújo and Eduardo Estrela, respectively.

== German play ==
The first performance of a German version of the play took place on 29 January 2011 in Berlin at Jüdisches Theater Bimah, directed by Thomas Maul. While the roles of Vito (played by Markus Riexinger) and Jimmy's girlfriend Kate (Katrin Stephan) were taken from the original play as they are, Jimmy Zoole was turned into a woman: Jenny Zola (Jasmin Steck), turning the relationship with Kate into a lesbian one.

== Argentine Play ==
The play was a success back in 1978 at the ATENEO Theater (Buenos Aires), produced by Carlos Rottemberg, directed by Emilio Alfaro and with Luis Brandoni and Gerardo Romano in its leading roles.

== Print references ==
- Egan, Sean (2011). Ponies & Rainbows: The Life of James Kirkwood. Oklahoma: BearManor Media. ISBN 978-1-59393-680-8.
