= Saturn Award for Best DVD or Blu-ray Release =

Film award category

- Awarded for: Best DVD/Blu-ray release of the year for a genre film
- Country: United States
- Presented by: Academy of Science Fiction, Fantasy and Horror Films
- First award: 2001
- Website: www.saturnawards.org

Saturn Award for Best DVD or Blu-ray Release (formerly Saturn Award for Best DVD Release) was an award presented by the Academy of Science Fiction, Fantasy and Horror Films for each film considered to be released either on DVD or on Blu-ray or both sometimes. The following is a list of the winners of this award:

== Winners ==
Year	Film	Ref
2001 (28th)	Ginger Snaps	
2001 (28th)	Bruiser	
2001 (28th)	Harry, He's Here to Help	
2001 (28th)	Lady and the Tramp II: Scamp's Adventure	
2001 (28th)	Panic	
2001 (28th)	Rat	
2002 (29th)	Dog Soldiers	
2002 (29th)	Brother's Keeper	
2002 (29th)	Dagon	
2002 (29th)	The Hunchback of Notre Dame II	
2002 (29th)	Metropolis	
2002 (29th)	Vampires: Los Muertos	
2003 (30th)	Bionicle: Mask of Light	
2003 (30th)	Anatomy 2	
2003 (30th)	The Hitcher II: I've Been Waiting	
2003 (30th)	Interstate 60	
2003 (30th)	May	
2003 (30th)	Millennium Actress	
2004 (31st)	Starship Troopers 2: Hero of the Federation	
2004 (31st)	Bionicle 2: Legends of Metru-Nui	
2004 (31st)	Ju-On: The Grudge	
2004 (31st)	The Lion King 1½	
2004 (31st)	The Lost Skeleton of Cadavra	
2004 (31st)	Ripley's Game	
2005 (32nd)	Ray Harryhausen: The Early Years Collection	
2005 (32nd)	Bionicle 3: Web of Shadows	
2005 (32nd)	Boo	
2005 (32nd)	Cube Zero	
2005 (32nd)	Dead & Breakfast	
2005 (32nd)	Ringers: Lord of the Fans	
2006 (33rd)	The Sci-Fi Boys	
2006 (33rd)	2001 Maniacs	
2006 (33rd)	Bambi II	
2006 (33rd)	Beowulf & Grendel	
2006 (33rd)	The Butterfly Effect 2	
2006 (33rd)	Hollow Man 2	
2007 (34th)	The Cabinet of Dr. Caligari	
2007 (34th)	Behind the Mask: The Rise of Leslie Vernon	
2007 (34th)	Driftwood	
2007 (34th)	The Man from Earth	
2007 (34th)	The Nines	
2007 (34th)	White Noise: The Light	
2008 (35th)	Jack Brooks: Monster Slayer	
2008 (35th)	Cold Prey	
2008 (35th)	The Deaths of Ian Stone	
2008 (35th)	Resident Evil: Degeneration	
2008 (35th)	Starship Troopers 3: Marauder	
2008 (35th)	Stuck	
2009 (36th)	Nothing But the Truth	
2009 (36th)	The House of the Devil	
2009 (36th)	Laid to Rest	
2009 (36th)	Not Forgotten	
2009 (36th)	Pontypool	
2009 (36th)	Super Capers	
2009 (36th)	Surveillance	
2010 (37th)	Never Sleep Again: The Elm Street Legacy	
2010 (37th)	The Disappearance of Alice Creed	
2010 (37th)	District 13: Ultimatum	
2010 (37th)	The Good Heart	
2010 (37th)	The New Daughter	
2010 (37th)	The Square	
2011 (38th)	Atlas Shrugged: Part I (tie)	
2011 (38th)	The Perfect Host (tie)	
2011 (38th)	13	
2011 (38th)	City of Life and Death	
2011 (38th)	The Double	
2011 (38th)	Kill the Irishman	
2011 (38th)	The Reef	
2012 (39th)	Touchback	
2012 (39th)	Atlas Shrugged Part II: The Strike	
2012 (39th)	Chained	
2012 (39th)	Cosmopolis	
2012 (39th)	The Possession	
2012 (39th)	A Thousand Cuts	
2013 (40th)	Big Ass Spider!	
2013 (40th)	The Brass Teapot	
2013 (40th)	Curse of Chucky	
2013 (40th)	Mischief Night	
2013 (40th)	Solomon Kane	
2013 (40th)	Twixt	
2013 (40th)	You're Next	
2014 (41st)	Odd Thomas	
2014 (41st)	Beneath	
2014 (41st)	Blue Ruin	
2014 (41st)	Ragnarok	
2014 (41st)	White Bird in a Blizzard	
2014 (41st)	Wolf Creek 2	
2015 (42nd)	Burying the Ex	
2015 (42nd)	Big Game	
2015 (42nd)	The Cobbler	
2015 (42nd)	Monsters: Dark Continent	
2015 (42nd)	The Tale of the Princess Kaguya	
2015 (42nd)	Wolf Totem	
2016 (43rd)	Tales of Halloween	
2016 (43rd)	Dog Eat Dog	
2016 (43rd)	The Girl	
2016 (43rd)	The Lobster	
2016 (43rd)	The Man Who Knew Infinity	
2016 (43rd)	The Wailing	
2017 (44th)	Dave Made a Maze	
2017 (44th)	2:22	
2017 (44th)	Colossal	
2017 (44th)	Cult of Chucky	
2017 (44th)	Devil's Whisper	
2017 (44th)	The Man from Earth: Holocene	
2018/2019 (45th)	King Cohen	
2018/2019 (45th)	Fahrenheit 451	
2018/2019 (45th)	Jonathan	
2018/2019 (45th)	Kin	
2018/2019 (45th)	Nancy Drew and the Hidden Staircase	
2018/2019 (45th)	Time Freak	
