= D.E.B.S. (2004 film) =

2004 film by Angela Robinson

- Theatrical release poster
- Directed by: Angela Robinson
- Screenplay by: Angela Robinson
- Based on: D.E.B.S. by Angela Robinson
- Produced by: Andrea Sperling; Jasmine Kosovic
- Starring: Sara Foster; Jordana Brewster; Meagan Good; Devon Aoki; Jill Ritchie
- Cinematography: M. David Mullen
- Edited by: Angela Robinson
- Music by: Steven M. Stern
- Production companies: Screen Gems; Destination Films; Anonymous Content
- Distributed by: Samuel Goldwyn Films
- Release dates: January 22, 2004 (Sundance); March 25, 2005 (United States)
- Running time: 92 minutes
- Country: United States
- Language: English
- Budget: $3.5 million
- Box office: $97,446

D.E.B.S. is a 2004 American action comedy film written, edited and directed by Angela Robinson, a feature-length adaptation of her 2003 short film of the same name. D.E.B.S. follows the relationship between spy-in-training Amy Bradshaw and supervillain Lucy Diamond.

D.E.B.S. received mixed reviews from critics and was described as underperforming at the box office on its initial release. It has since gained a reputation as a cult classic, especially amongst the queer community.

== Plot ==
Embedded in the SAT is a secret test that determines aptitude for espionage, and those who score highly on the test are recruited into D.E.B.S. (Discipline, Energy, Beauty, Strength), a clandestine paramilitary academy. Four D.E.B.S.—Max, Janet, Dominique and Amy—are tasked by Ms. Petrie and Mr. Phipps, the heads of D.E.B.S. academy, to surveil Lucy Diamond, an infamous supercriminal. Amy in particular is interested in Lucy due to writing a senior thesis about her. It is believed that Lucy is meeting Russian assassin Ninotchka Kaprova, which turns out to be a blind date.

Amy has recently broken up with her controlling boyfriend, Bobby, a fellow agent. The D.E.B.S. observe Lucy's date with Ninotchka, and are interrupted by Bobby, who is on his own stakeout, with several other intelligence agencies also observing Lucy. Amy gets into an argument with Bobby, demanding answers on their breakup, which catches Lucy's attention. A shootout ensues, during which Max reminds Janet that she has not yet earned her D.E.B.S. stripes, and Lucy flees while being chased by the D.E.B.S. Lucy is caught in a standoff with Amy, but they end up having a friendly conversation. Lucy escapes when Amy's attention wavers, and the D.E.B.S. praise Amy for being the only person to have ever faced Lucy and lived.

Lucy quickly takes a liking to Amy, and, against the advice of her friend and henchman, Scud, sneaks into Amy's dorm. Lucy initially says she wants to help Amy on her thesis but ends up coercing her into joining her at a nightclub, along with Janet, who had caught the two speaking. During this trip, Lucy and Amy grow closer and Lucy clarifies that the deaths of the agents sent after her were happenstance. Janet and Scud also befriend each other. Lucy and Amy nearly kiss but are interrupted by Janet.

Later, Amy is promoted to squad leader, replacing Max, much to her jealousy. Ms. Petrie plans on using Amy's encounter with Lucy to boost the D.E.B.S. image and reputation, though Amy is hesitant to talk about her encounter due to her growing feelings for Lucy. The D.E.B.S. respond to a bank heist orchestrated by Lucy, which she has committed in order to see Amy again. When Lucy and Amy are alone, the two kiss, and Lucy talks Amy into running off with her. The D.E.B.S. assume Amy has been kidnapped and organize a nationwide manhunt to find her. In the meantime, Lucy and Amy enjoy having an actual relationship with one another while Janet covers for them and develops feelings for Scud, whom she has a secret correspondence with.

On the basis of a tip from a jealous Ninotchka, the D.E.B.S. and Bobby discover Amy and Lucy while they are having sex. When Amy returns to the academy, Ms. Petrie prepares to exile Amy, but Max convinces her to claim that Amy was kidnapped and brainwashed in order to protect their reputation. Amy becomes depressive when forced to go along with the story, and Bobby tries to coerce Amy into getting back together with him. When Lucy tries to see Amy again, Amy is forced to reject her, making Lucy realize she is not happy with her life of crime. In an attempt to win Amy back, Lucy returns everything she has ever stolen and publicly turns over a new leaf.

At the D.E.B.S. year-end dance, Amy is to be made D.E.B. of the year and deliver a speech denouncing Lucy. She briefly talks with Mr. Phipps about just what the actual test measures (as she recorded a perfect score), and he reveals that the test actually measures one's ability to lie, in essence saying that perfect liars make perfect spies. Janet talks with Dominique and Max, who start to realize how unhappy Amy actually is. Lucy infiltrates the academy during the dance. Upon discovering this, Bobby plans to track Lucy down and kill her. Lucy evades Bobby only to hear Amy's speech about her experience as Lucy's captive. When Amy and Lucy meet eyes, Amy retracts her entire speech and runs off-stage. Ms. Petrie, Bobby, and the rest of the academy try to track them down while Lucy and Amy are cornered by Max, Janet, and Dominique. When Amy reminds Max of her promise to always be her friend, they give their blessings to Lucy and Amy, and allow them to escape. Max finally awards Janet her D.E.B.S. stripes, and Janet and Scud begin a relationship. Lucy and Amy ride off into the night, heads on one another's shoulders.

== Cast ==
- Sara Foster as Amy Bradshaw
- Jordana Brewster as Lucy Diamond
- Meagan Good as Max Brewer
- Devon Aoki as Dominique
- Jill Ritchie as Janet
- Geoff Stults as Bobby Matthews
- Jimmi Simpson as "Scud"
- Holland Taylor as Ms. Petrie
- Michael Clarke Duncan as Mr. Phipps
- Jessica Cauffiel as Ninotchka Kaprova
- Christina Kirk as Madeleine

Ritchie was the only cast member from the short film to reprise her role as Janet in the feature-length film.

== Production ==
=== Inception ===
Director, writer, and editor Angela Robinson began to draw comics about the D.E.B.S. in college as a sideline to her writing. She received a $20,000 grant from POWER UP to make an 11-minute short based on the concept, which toured a number of film festivals, including the Sundance Film Festival. Clint Culpepper, then president of Screen Gems, liked the short and gave the green light to develop it into a feature film.

Fans of the movie were concerned that the lesbian relationship would be written out or downplayed, as occurred in, e.g., Fried Green Tomatoes. Robinson told AfterEllen.com that "The relationship between Amy and Lucy is still the heart of the movie... Screen Gems has been outrageously supportive. I was not pressured to tone down the relationship — if anything, we worked together... to make the relationship more complex and intimate".

== Reception ==
=== Box office ===
D.E.B.S. was released in 45 theaters. Over 21 days, it grossed $97,446.

=== Critical response ===
On the review aggregator website Rotten Tomatoes, 42% of 64 critics' reviews are positive. The website's consensus reads: "Lacking enough material for a full-length movie, D.E.B.S. is short on both plot and laughs." Metacritic, which uses a weighted average, assigned the film a score of 42 out of 100, based on 21 critics, indicating "mixed or average" reviews.

In a positive review, Stephen Hunter of The Washington Post praised the film for poking fun at various tropes in spy films and not taking itself too seriously, saying “much of the fun of the innocent little thing is the riffs that [Angela] Robinson plays on familiar genre strokes. A gunfight in a nightclub, with sparks flying, guns blasting, glasses busting, shooters diving, has all the hallmarks of John Woo-style mayhem in full bloom.” He added the film “arrives with sparkly production values and extreme confidence in every scene. It's so spoofy it's difficult to call it ‘good’ or even ‘bad’; just say it's smooth.” Hunter further discussed how the film presents queerness in a normalized way, saying the film is “not gay in that in-your-face, zealous manner of so many films more interested in advocacy than art or commerce. It's gay in what might be called a homo-normative way. That is, it accepts same-sex attraction as a norm, something not at all ‘unusual’ or strange but something so a part of the landscape it doesn't require comment.”

Peter Travers of Rolling Stone gave a one-star rating and said, "You might think there's no downside to a movie that peeks up the skirts of babes in micro-minis, but writer-director Angela Robinson's dimwitted satire is libido-killing proof to the contrary."

A positive reaction from a producer at a film festival screening led to Robinson making a deal to direct the 2005 Disney remake Herbie: Fully Loaded.

From retrospective reviews, Paste wrote "in the 20 years since this film debuted, there is still a distinct lack of lesbian films (let alone lesbian rom-coms) that are as effortlessly queer, undeniably heartfelt and innately rewatchable" and that "D.E.B.S. remains a cornerstone of lesbian cinema, and a cult classic always worth revisiting". Maddy Myers, for Polygon, commented that the film "feels like a movie that teenage-me, a queer kid who adored screwball comedies, was meant to watch a billion times".

=== Accolades ===
Year	Festival	Award	Recipients	Result
2004	Berlin International Film Festival	Reader Jury of the "Siegessäule"	Angela Robinson	Won
2005	Black Movie Awards	Outstanding Achievement in Writing	Angela Robinson	Nominated
2005	Black Movie Awards	Outstanding Performance by an Actress in a Leading Role	Meagan Good	Nominated

== Legacy ==
Academic Claire Hines, in her article "The Queer Female Action Spy Hero in Post-Millennial American Cinema", highlighted that "when D.E.B.S. was released the queer press responded positively to the film as part of a wider breakthrough" and that the film "is also recognized by action scholars as significant in the development of the female action hero". Hines commented that "the use of camp is especially important to the challenges that D.E.B.S. makes to the heteronormative codes and conventions of spy action. [...] D.E.B.S. makes a strong statement about the female action hero as a queer figure, the (guilty) pleasures of spy action and teen romantic comedy and is intentionally playful with the secret identity trope".
