= Mike Mendez =

American filmmaker and actor (born 1973)

- Born: 1973 (age 52–53); Los Angeles, California, U.S.
- Occupations: Film director; producer; screenwriter; editor; actor

Mike Mendez (born 1973) is an American filmmaker. Best known for his work in the horror genre, his directorial credits include The Convent (2000), The Gravedancers (2006), and Big Ass Spider! (2013).

== Early life ==
Mendez was born and raised in Los Angeles, California. His parents are from the Republic of El Salvador.

== Career ==
Mendez's debut feature, Killers, played at the Sundance Film Festival in 1997. Centered on two psychotic brothers who escape from death row and take a suburban family hostage, it was described by Variety as a "parodistic genre piece", and by Sundance head Geoffrey Gilmore as "completely delirious and truly inspired". His next notable project was The Convent (2000), a supernatural horror film starring Adrienne Barbeau, which critic Joe Leydon felt was "markedly more accomplished than the usual run of self-consciously campy horror schlock", adding: "[Mendez] dwells gleefully on scenes of jokey, over-the-top gore, but otherwise keeps the pace brisk enough to sustain the fang-in-cheek mood".

Mendez received praise for his work on The Gravedancers (2006), a ghost story set in a cemetery, with Fangoria commenting, "If the basic narrative [is] familiar ... Mendez [proves] that it can still work when staged with gusto. There are moments when the action and images tip over into silliness, but you have to hand it to Mendez: the very last major effect is completely gonzo and yet done with such poker-faced conviction that the scene remains exciting instead of becoming laughable". His next film was the sci-fi creature feature Big Ass Spider!, which premiered at SXSW in 2013 and was positively reviewed by critics: The Hollywood Reporter called it "shamelessly Corman-esque", saying that it "does almost everything just a tiny bit better than it needs to" and "relishes its campy heritage from the title card onward", while Paste's Jim Vorel wrote, "It has a motor on it, propelling itself through its under-80 minute runtime without ever taking a breath ... There will undoubtedly be detractors who lump it into the same category as [Sharknado] but [there's] an easily noticeable upgrade in quality [here]. It's more good-natured, less stilted and in many ways more fun".

Mendez directed two films released in 2016: action thriller The Last Heist and horror comedy Don't Kill It. Describing the latter, which follows an eccentric demon hunter, The Austin Chronicle said it was full of "belly laughs" and noted, "[Mendez has never] hit quite the right tone in his films to date ... But in the perfectly self-aware Lundgren, he has [found] his perfect muse/foil for his brand of [smart and silly] horror spoof". In a similarly positive review, the Los Angeles Times commended Mendez on his ability to "[crank] up the pace", as well as for bringing "a lightness and unpretentiousness" to the material. His next film as director was the 2022 anthology feature Satanic Hispanics, of which Paste said, "The way these stories all blend into one darkly hilarious, deliciously violent stew is almost hypnotic".

In addition to directing and producing, Mendez has worked as an editor on many of his own features, alongside various documentaries, television films, and series such as Beavis and Butt-Head. His acting roles include small parts in Hatchet II (2010), Terror Toons 3 (2015), and Malignant (2021).

== Filmography ==
=== Film ===
Selected credits
Year	Title	Director	Writer	Producer	Editor	Notes
1996	Killers	Yes	Yes	No	No	
1997	Bimbo Movie Bash	Yes	Yes	No	No	
2000	The Convent	Yes	No	No	No	Winner: Audience Award, Fantafestival Nominee: Best Film, Fantasporto
2006	The Gravedancers	Yes	No	Yes	Yes	
2010	Midgets vs. Mascots	No	No	No	Yes	
2013	Big Ass Spider!	Yes	No	No	Yes	Nominee: Audience Award, SXSW Nominee: Best Independent Film, Rondo Hatton Classic Horror Awards
2015	Tales of Halloween	Yes	Yes	Yes	Yes	Segment: "Friday the 31st"
2016	The Last Heist	Yes	No	No	Yes	
2016	Don't Kill It	Yes	No	No	Yes	
2018	Nightmare Cinema	No	No	No	Yes	
2019	The Shed	No	No	No	Yes	
2019	Acceleration	No	No	No	Yes	
2022	Satanic Hispanics	Yes	No	Yes	Yes	Segment: "The Traveler" Winner: Best Director, Fantastic Fest
2022	Beavis and Butt-Head Do the Universe	No	No	No	Yes	
2023	Slotherhouse	No	No	No	Yes	

=== Television ===
Selected credits
Year	Title	Director	Writer	Producer	Editor	Notes
2002	Masters of Horror	Yes	Yes	Yes	Yes	Documentary
2009	Jockeys	No	No	No	Yes	6 episodes
2013	Alaska Gold Diggers	No	No	No	Yes	6 episodes
2015	Lavalantula	Yes	Yes	No	Yes	TV film
2018	Stan Against Evil	No	Yes	No	No	1 episode
2019	Critters Attack!	No	No	No	Yes	TV film
2022–2023	Beavis and Butt-Head	No	No	No	Yes	22 episodes
