= Shoes (Kelly song) =

2006 song by Liam Kyle Sullivan

Song by Kelly

from the album Shoes
- Released: May 5, 2006
- Genre: Electroclash
- Length: 2:47
- Songwriter: Liam Kyle Sullivan

Music video
- "Shoes" on YouTube

"Shoes" is a song recorded by American actor Liam Kyle Sullivan, performing as his alter ego, Kelly. After Sullivan posted its music video to his own website in early 2006, he uploaded it to YouTube on May 5, 2006, where it became one of the first-ever viral videos online. It was included on Kelly's debut studio album, also titled Shoes (2006).

"Shoes" is a satirical electroclash song about Kelly, a moody teenage valley girl, going on a shopping spree for shoes on her birthday. It was praised by critics for its memorable lyrics, surreal video, and Sullivan's characterization of Kelly. Sullivan performed "Shoes" live during Margaret Cho's off-Broadway show The Sensuous Woman (2007) and for a one-off 2024 Pride Month performance that went viral online. The music video won the People's Choice Award for Favorite User-Generated Video in 2008. It has appeared on several lists of the best YouTube videos of all time and has been described as an important moment in the history of YouTube and of the Internet due to its virality.

== Background ==
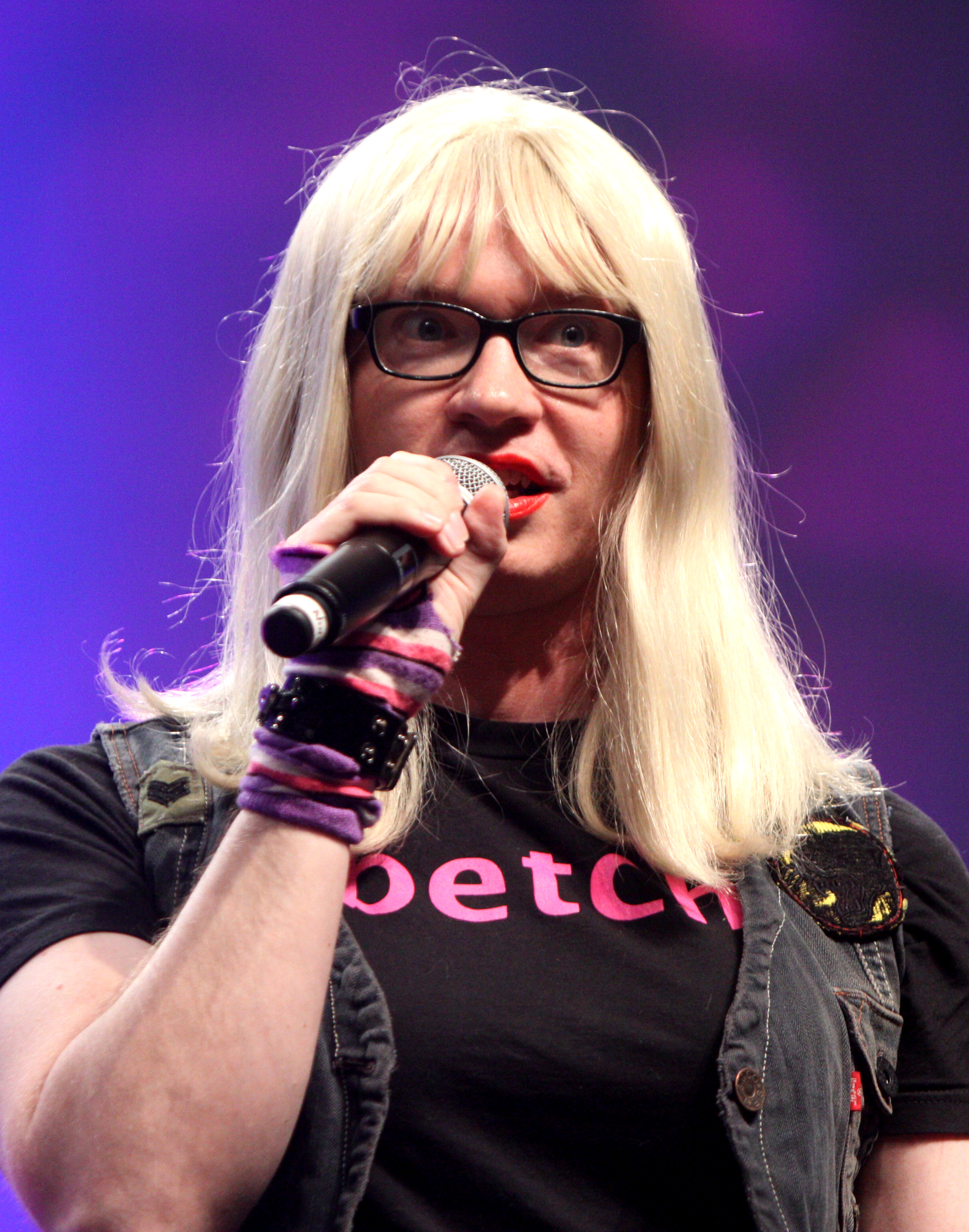
Sullivan, as Kelly, in 2012

Prior to performing as Kelly, Liam Kyle Sullivan worked as an actor in Los Angeles, having previously appeared in the series Gilmore Girls and 8 Simple Rules, and was a member of the comedy troupe Drama 3/4. He also had a live comedy show, the Liam Show, which began in 2004 and incorporated video skits he filmed. His character of Kelly is a mercurial teenage valley girl who wears a leather jacket, glasses, a blonde wig which Sullivan borrowed from his ex-girlfriend, and striped white-and-red tights. She was based on various women in his life, including his mother and his older sister, the latter of whom he used as the basis for Kelly's restrictive family dynamics due to the "restrictions on her that [he] didn't have" growing up. Before writing "Shoes", Sullivan performed as Kelly by only changing his voice, imagining her as a teenage girl speaking with braces on. He performed as her at the ACME Comedy Theatre but stated that "it didn't work [and] wasn't funny" without the accompanying costume.

Sullivan was inspired to write "Shoes", Kelly's debut song, after repeatedly saying the word "shoes" in Kelly's voice and finding it funny. He was also inspired by his mother's love of shoes and by a friend who told him about having spent $300 on a pair. "Shoes" began as a comedy sketch, which Sullivan first performed as Kelly at a small club in Santa Monica in 2005, before being adapted into a song which he wrote in 15 minutes. He performed the song live several times and, encouraged by audiences' positive reception to it, decided to film a music video for it.

== Composition ==
"Shoes"
A 17-second-long sample of "Shoes", in which Kelly says the hook ("Oh my god, shoes") in a monotone and decides which shoes "rule" and which shoes "suck"

Musically, "Shoes" is a satirical and rhythmic electroclash song with house– and techno–based production. Sullivan performs on the song in a deadpan monotone. In its lyrics, Kelly sings the refrain "Oh my god, shoes"; points out which shoes "rule" and which shoes "suck"; decides to buy a pair of $300 shoes; and is told by several store clerks, "I think you have too many shoes," to which she retorts, "Shut up!" several times. Sullivan explained Kelly's obsession with shoe shopping as being "like oxygen for her" and "a robotic thing for her". Toward the end of the song, a saleswoman tells Kelly that a pair of shoes she wants likely will not fit her, explaining, "Your feet are kinda big." Kelly launches into a rage and attacks the woman. Kelly loudly exclaims "FUCK YOU" several times and sings, "Those shoes are mine, betch" repeatedly as she fights the woman. Sullivan described the end of the song as "explor[ing] Kelly's rage more".

Sullivan stated that "Shoes" was inspired by electroclash acts such as Peaches and Chicks on Speed, who were "so expressive, but not doing too much". Justine McDaniel of The Washington Post described "Shoes" as having "simplistic lyrics, flat valley-girl tune and big personality". In his 2011 book Reading YouTube: The Critical Viewers Guide, Anandam P. Kavoori described "Shoes" as "an over-determined text" that "affirm[s] the terms of the contract between object and identity that shoes represent for women" and compared its tone of "feminist agency" to that in the Nancy Sinatra song "These Boots Are Made for Walkin'".

== Music video ==
Sullivan wrote and directed the music video for "Shoes" after his friend convinced him to make one for the song. It was filmed in early 2006 on a Panasonic camcorder on location at the Electric Grasshopper, a shoe store in Silver Lake, Los Angeles, and co-stars Sullivan's friends, also actors. He enlisted other friends to edit and film the video.

The music video begins with a skit in which Kelly and her twin brother (both played by Sullivan) open birthday presents given to them by their father (also played by Sullivan) and mother (played by Pam Cook). Her brother receives a new computer and a car, while Kelly receives a stuffed animal of a purple dinosaur. After expressing her disappointment, her mother asks if she expected "con-dams" as they argue. She leaves in fit to go on a shoe shopping spree with her friends. When the clerks comment on the large amount of shoes Kelly has, she steps a clerk with her shoes, transitioning the video. Kelly then holds a pool party that is attended by her many friends and a person in a robot costume. As Kelly enters a rage, the video is interlaced with scenes of a woman dancing with a flaming hula hoop. Kelly and her friends attack the saleswoman in various ways. The fighting prompts a police officer to intervene. To Kelly's shock, the purple dinosaur toy comes to life and attacks the police officer to protect her. The dancing woman extinguishes the flaming hula hoop, causing the video to go black.

Tray Butler of HX likened the video to that for Cyndi Lauper's song "Girls Just Wanna Have Fun", particularly in its opening skit. Eric Newman of Footwear News described the video as "campy" and as having "next-to-no budget". Advertising Age and Wired both compared it and other music videos by Sullivan as Kelly to the sketch comedy series The Kids in the Hall. Kavoori wrote that "Shoes" was closer to having the framework of a short film than a music video and described Kelly as "an irreverent mix of Madonna and Ugly Betty".

== Release and virality ==
The music video for "Shoes" was originally uploaded exclusively to Sullivan's own website but, after a fan reuploaded it to YouTube, he created an account on the site to post his own upload of the video on May 5, 2006; he also posted it to a MySpace account he had created for Kelly. It quickly went viral on YouTube and was widely shared via email. Sullivan described the experience of the song's virality as "great" but "a little confusing" since, at the time, the concept of virality "was new, at least for videos". By November 2006, the music video for "Shoes" had more than one million views on YouTube, and rose to having 15 million views in 2008; 34 million in 2010; and 54 million in 2014. By 2024, it had more than 69 million. "Shoes" was included on Sullivan's debut studio album as Kelly, which was also titled Shoes (2006).

"Shoes" has been described as one of the first viral videos online. McDaniel described it in 2024 as "one of America's first viral videos" and "a key piece of pop culture in general". Lyons wrote in 2016 that "Shoes" was "what we might call the very first viral video of the internet" which "heralded the true beginning of the viral age" for being self-made, contrasting it with the previously viral 2005 YouTube music video for The Lonely Island's song "Lazy Sunday", which was more notable for its "means of access" than for its "actual exposure". Carly Lamphere wrote for Online Searcher in 2019 that "Shoes" was "one of the first viral videos ever" that was "all anyone could talk about in late 2006", which "ushered in a new age of the viral video star". Rolling Stone included "Shoes" on their 2020 list of the "viral videos that built YouTube". In 2024, Sam Gutelle of Tubefilter called Sullivan "one of YouTube's earliest viral stars".

== Reception and accolades ==
Newman called "Shoes" "infectious" for its "throbbing" beat and "catchy" lyrics, naming its lyric "Those shoes are mine, betch," an "instant classic". Sarah Kuhn of Back Stage East called the song "hilariously hypnotic", while TheaterMania called it "odd" and "weirdly funny". Patrick Lyons of Noisey retrospectively described the song and video as "bizarre, grating, and hilarious". Lamphere wrote in 2019, "In my personal opinion, no YouTube star will ever top the ingenuity of Liam Kyle Sullivan and 'Shoes,' no matter how many followers, reposts, and TV show deals anyone gets." Also in 2019, American DJ Gay Panic called the song "one of the greatest electroclash tracks" and an example of the genre being well-liked for featuring "cool chicks and dudes whispering cool stuff over simple beats they can dance to when they're on cocaine". Gutelle called it Sullivan's "undisputed magnum opus" for its "wealth of quotable lines" and "Sullivan's perfect portrayal of a stereotypical valley girl". Rolling Stone praised the video as "a masterpiece of the comedic parody song trend" and the song as "a perfect dance-pop time capsule" that "predicated the type of quick-cut musical moments that would take over viral video culture through TikTok".

"Shoes" has been noted by commentators for its popularity among and impact on gay men. Butler wrote that the song had "fags all over America chanting" its lyrics, while The Advocate wrote in 2007, "Any gay man with a YouTube account has surely seen Liam Sullivan's viral sensation 'Shoes,' ... [which] has such a gay sensibility that the most surprising thing about the clip may be that its creator is actually—gulp—straight." Sullivan has stated that he does not consider the character of Kelly to be a form of drag. McDaniel described the song as having "had a special impact on the LGBTQ+ community".

At the 34th People's Choice Awards in 2008, "Shoes" won the inaugural award for Favorite User-Generated Video. Time and Thrillist included "Shoes" on their lists of the best YouTube videos of all time, while Teen Vogue and USA Today included it on their lists of the best viral YouTube videos. Popular Mechanics included "Shoes" on their list of the best moments in the history of the Internet.

== Live performances ==
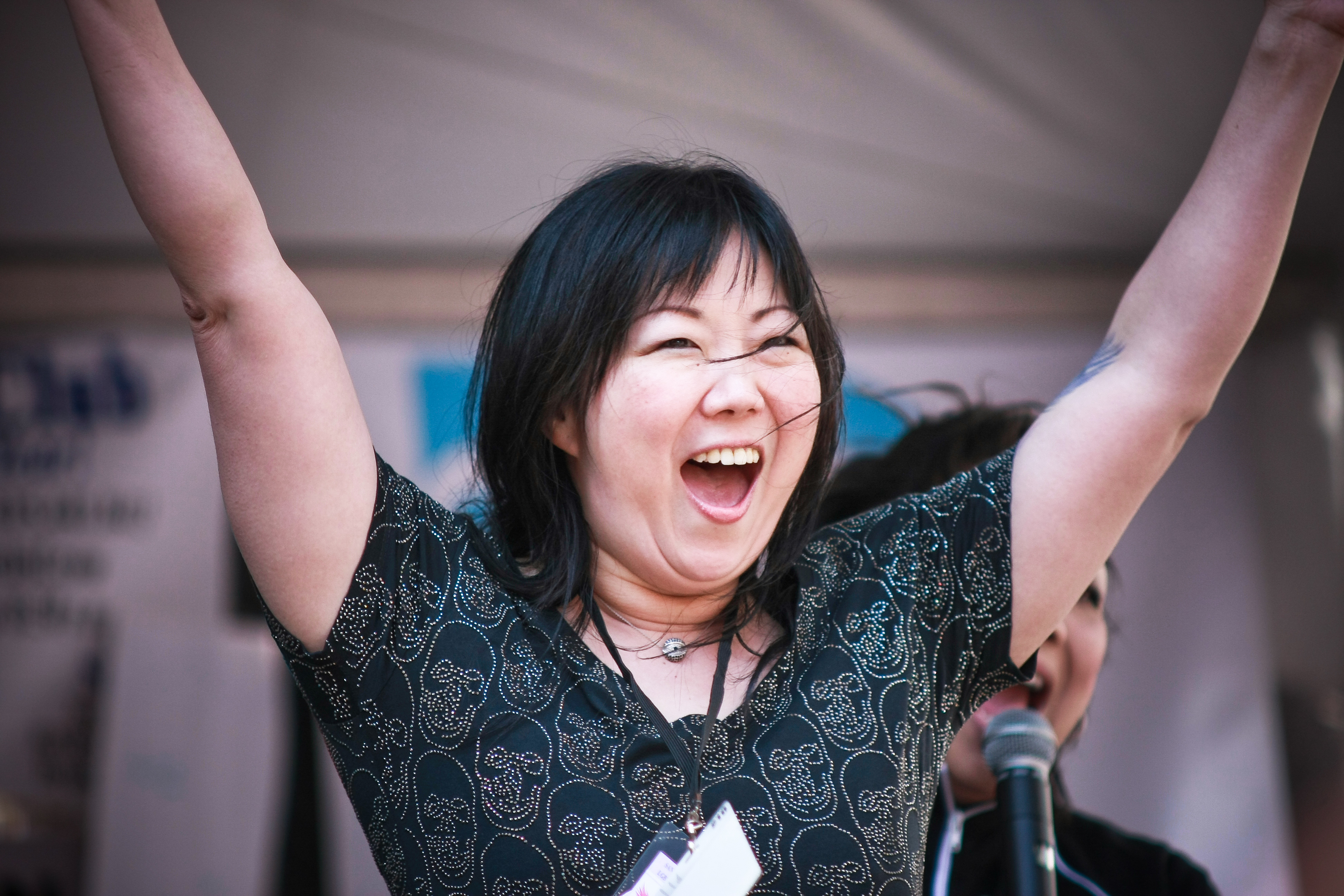
The robot costume used in the music video for "Shoes" was created by artist Al Ridenour, whose wife, comedian Margaret Cho (pictured), became a fan and collaborator of Sullivan's

Sullivan found the robot costume from the video for "Shoes" on a flyer at a Los Angeles coffee shop and reached out to its creator, who he later learned was artist Al Ridenour after his wife, comedian Margaret Cho, blogged about it. After Sullivan sent the video to Ridenour, he showed it to Cho, who said she was "instantly obsessed" with the video and began collaborating with him. After she appeared in "Text Message Breakup", the follow-up video to "Shoes", Cho brought Sullivan to perform "Shoes" as Kelly as part of her off-Broadway neo-burlesque show The Sensuous Woman in 2007. Charles Isherwood called Sullivan's performance the "liveliest segment" of The Sensuous Woman for The New York Times, opining that "Shoes" was "arguably even funnier live". Conversely, Chris Jones of the Chicago Tribune, in his review of The Sensuous Woman, criticized Sullivan's as a "heinous shtick" that "goes on forever" and "[makes] you want to throw your own shoes at the stage", while TheaterMania wrote that Sullivan "[wore] out [his] welcome rather quickly" after performing "Shoes".

In June 2024, Sullivan performed "Shoes" as Kelly for the first time in several years at a Pride Month event at Precinct, a gay bar in Downtown Los Angeles. Videos of the performance went viral on social media, including in a video on X that received seven million views, with users praising it for its millennial nostalgia. Time's Moises Mendez II described the performance's warm reception as evidence of "the staying power of great, original content", adding, "'Shoes' will always live on."

== Media appearances and remixes ==
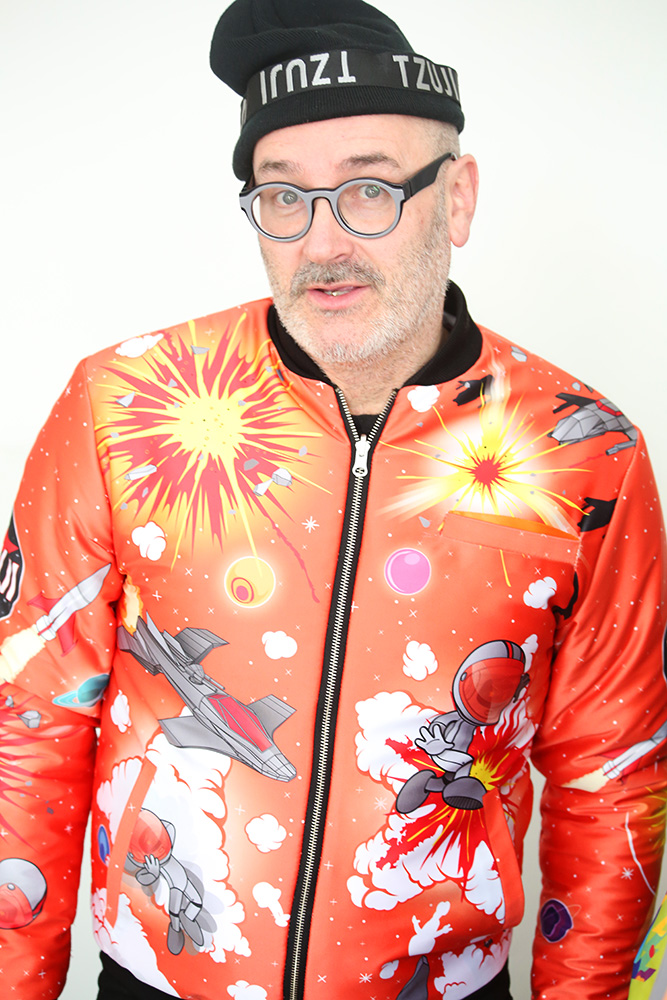
Larry Tee's (pictured) remix of "Shoes" appeared on his 2009 album Club Badd

"Shoes" was played on Good Day L.A. and Total Request Live. In October 2024, Sullivan performed a rendition of "Shoes" as Kelly in a social media advertisement for Crocs' "Siren clog", a platform mule, in which the saleswoman who remarks on Kelly's shoe size instead goes to find the shoe in her size.

Larry Tee's remix of "Shoes" appeared on Tee's album Club Badd, released in 2009. Sullivan made a YouTube video commemorating the ten-year anniversary of "Shoes" in 2016, by which point he was primarily working as a video editor. In September 2020, Sullivan released "Masks", a remix of "Shoes" with lyrics about the importance of using face masks during the COVID-19 pandemic.

In October 2026, Sullivan appeared in character as Kelly in Mozilla's Come Back to Firefox advertising campaign, alongside several other viral internet personalities from the 2000s and 2010s. The campaign used nostalgia for early internet culture to promote Firefox.
