= The Perfect Host =

2010 film by Nicholas Tomnay

- Theatrical release poster
- Directed by: Nicholas Tomnay
- Written by: Nicholas Tomnay; Krishna Jones
- Based on: 2001 short film The Host by Tomnay
- Produced by: Mark Victor; Stacey Testro
- Starring: David Hyde Pierce; Clayne Crawford; Helen Reddy
- Cinematography: John Brawley
- Edited by: Nicholas Tomnay
- Music by: John Swihart
- Distributed by: Magnolia Pictures
- Release dates: January 2010 (Sundance); July 1, 2011 (United States)
- Running time: 92 minutes
- Country: United States
- Language: English
- Budget: $1 million
- Box office: $450,885

The Perfect Host is a 2010 American black comedy psychological thriller film co-written and directed by Nicholas Tomnay in his feature directorial debut, and starring David Hyde Pierce and Clayne Crawford. It is a remake of Tomnay's short film The Host (2001).

The Perfect Host was released in the United States in July 2011. It received mixed reviews from critics, who praised the performances of Hyde Pierce and Crawford, but criticized the pacing.

== Plot ==
Fugitive John Taylor flees from an initially unspecified crime scene, with a wounded foot (with flashbacks and news reports revealing that he has robbed a bank, in collusion with a teller). He stops in a convenience store for some disinfectant, just moments before it is robbed; he turns the tables on the robber, but she gets away with his wallet. The store's CCTV identifies John and his car, so he quickly abandons it, proceeding on foot into an expensive neighborhood. Claiming to have been mugged, he gains entry to the house of Warwick Wilson, who is preparing a dinner party. John makes small talk and drinks red wine while trying to figure out his next move, and how to keep his lies from being found out. When the radio makes an announcement about the robbery, he angrily shushes Warwick and reveals himself. After forcing him to call his guests to cancel the party, John states that he intends to kill Warwick, but that he might spare him if he accommodates John until morning. Suddenly, John keels over; the wine has been drugged, and Warwick is not the person he seems.

When John comes to, he is tied to a chair, and the party is in full swing, but with all the other guests being mere figments of Warwick's imagination. Warwick takes a Polaroid picture of John and reveals a scrapbook of his past dinner parties, featuring similarly captive guests arranged in a timeline of increasing distress and injury which culminates in death. Unbeknownst to John, Warwick's imaginary guests are cleaned up and respectable versions of the people in the album. As the night wears on, John is further terrorized, drugged and incapacitated, and learns various things about Warwick's strange lifestyle.

John and Warwick play chess, with the prize being John's freedom; John, who is an excellent player, wins. Warwick lets John go as agreed but taunts him before he can leave, calling him worthless. John takes one of the swords on display in Warwick's living room and stabs him with it, but it proves to be a collapsible prop. John is knocked out and regains consciousness in Warwick's bathtub, where Warwick runs a blade across John's throat.

John's body is left outside with the trash. He awakens and discovers that most of his injuries are fake; Warwick is a master of movie makeup. Detective Morton, who has been investigating the robbery, arrives at Warwick's door; it is revealed that Warwick is a police lieutenant supervising the case. Meanwhile, John becomes suspicious of Simone, the bank teller he conspired with, and discovers that she made alternate travel arrangements out of Los Angeles that don't include him. John confronts Simone in a parking garage over her betrayal and faking illness which motivated him to rob the bank to pay for her medical treatment. He takes her car and the money, leaving her to be captured by the detectives. However, Warwick stops John from leaving and takes the money at gunpoint, leaving him with a couple thousand dollars to flee to Mexico.

A couple of months later, Detective Morton receives mail from Mexico (implied to be from John) containing a Polaroid of Warwick and John together at a dinner party. Morton confronts Warwick, who dismisses it as a fake, but when Morton persists, Warwick invites Morton to a dinner party.

== Cast ==
- David Hyde Pierce as Warwick Wilson
- Clayne Crawford as John Taylor
- Helen Reddy as Cathy Knight, Warrick's neighbor
- Megahn Perry as Simone Demarchi, John's girlfriend
- Joseph Will as Detective Valdez
- Nathaniel Parker as Detective Morton
- Brooke Anderson as Thief

== Production ==
Principal photography took place in Los Angeles over 17 days in autumn of 2008.

== Release ==
The film premiered in January 2010 at the Sundance Film Festival. The Perfect Host played at several other film festivals, including Fantasia International Film Festival and Sitges Film Festival. It won the audience award at the 2011 Amsterdam Fantastic Film Festival, a Saturn Award, and was named the Best Feature at the 2011 Abertoir festival (Wales's national horror film festival).

The film had a limited theatrical release in the United States on July 1, 2011.

== Reception ==
On the review aggregator website Rotten Tomatoes, 44% of 32 critics' reviews are positive, with an average rating of 5.20/10. Metacritic, which uses a weighted average, assigned the film a score of 48 out of 100, based on 16 critics, indicating "mixed or average" reviews.

The film tied with Atlas Shrugged: Part 1 for the 2011 Saturn Award for Best DVD or Blu-ray Release.
