= Justin Walker (actor) =

American actor

- Born: U.S.
- Education: Washington and Lee University
- Occupations: Actor, filmmaker, restaurant owner
- Years active: 1985–2005

Justin Walker is an American actor best known for his portrayal of Christian Stovitz in the 1995 film Clueless.

He is a graduate of Washington and Lee University in Lexington, Virginia, having majored in theater.

Walker owned Teddy Teadle's Grill in Rancho Mirage, California. He was Partner & CMO in Draftster.com, a now-defunct fantasy sport wagering website.

== Filmography ==
Year	Title	Role	Notes
1995	Clueless	Christian Stovitz	
1996	Humanoids from the Deep	Matt	TV movie
1996	Last Resort	Webber Smythe	TV movie
1997	The Journey: Absolution		
1999	Splendor Falls		
1999	V.I.P.		TV series; 1 episode
1999	Born Bad	Brian	
1999–2000	The X Show	Co-host	talk show
2000	Boltneck	Lance Kipple	
2001	E! True Hollywood Story: Clueless	Himself	Archive footage; documentary
2001	I Shaved My Crotch For This	Sam	
2001	The Man Every Woman Wants	Himself	
2001	The Perfect Lover		
2003	A.P.U.: Art, Pot, and Underwear	Rhodes	Short film
2005	Clueless: The Class of '95	Himself	Documentary
2005	Clueless: Language Arts	Himself	Documentary
2005	Clueless: Fashion 101	Himself	Documentary
2005	Clueless: We're History	Himself	Documentary
2005	Takeout	Don Libishitz	

== Other work ==
- 1998 - Pizza Hut "Edge Pizza" Commercial
