= Tall Hopes =

American television sitcom (1993)

- Genre: Sitcom
- Created by: Michael Elias; Rich Eustis
- Starring: George Wallace; Anna Maria Horsford; Kenny Blank; Terrence Howard; Karla Green
- Composer: Ed Alton
- Country of origin: United States
- Original language: English
- No. of seasons: 1
- No. of episodes: 6 (3 unaired)

Production
- Executive producers: Michael Elias; Rich Eustis
- Running time: 22 minutes
- Production companies: Eustis/Elias Productions; Warner Bros. Television

Original release
- Network: CBS
- Release: August 25 – September 8, 1993

Tall Hopes is an American sitcom television series created by Michael Elias and Rich Eustis. The series stars George Wallace, Anna Maria Horsford, Kenny Blank, Terrence Howard and Karla Green. The series aired on CBS from August 25 to September 8, 1993.

== Cast ==
- George Wallace as George Harris
- Anna Maria Horsford as Lainie Harris
- Kenny Blank as Ernest Harris
- Terrence Howard as Chester Harris
- Karla Green as DeeDee Harris

== Episodes ==
No.	Title	Directed by	Written by	Original release date	U.S. viewers (millions)
1	"Pilot"	Sam Weisman	Rich Eustis and Michael Elias	August 25, 1993	11.0
2	"Get the Jet"	Unknown	Unknown	September 1, 1993	9.1
3	"Will Work for Credit"	Robert Berlinger	Michael Anthony Snowden	September 8, 1993	8.8
4	"Scalped"	N/A	N/A	Unaired	N/A
5	"Fantasy Girl"	N/A	N/A	Unaired	N/A
6	"Shorts, Laws, & Videotape"	N/A	N/A	Unaired	N/A
