= P.S. Your Cat Is Dead (film) =

P.S. Your Cat is Dead!
- Directed by: Steve Guttenberg
- Written by: Steve Guttenberg
- Based on: P.S. Your Cat Is Dead by James Kirkwood, Jr.
- Produced by: Kyle A. Clark
- Starring: Lombardo Boyar; Steve Guttenberg; Cynthia Watros; Shirley Knight; A.J. Benza; Tom Knight
- Cinematography: David A. Armstrong
- Edited by: Derek Vaughn
- Music by: Dean Grinsfelder
- Distributed by: TLA Releasing
- Release date: February 22, 2002 (US)
- Running time: 92 minutes
- Country: United States
- Language: English
- Box office: $28,454

P.S. Your Cat is Dead! is a 2002 American comedy film directed by Steve Guttenberg. The film is based on the novel of the same name published by James Kirkwood, Jr. in 1972, and a 1975 play.

The film stars Guttenberg as Jimmy Zoole, an unemployed actor whose life is falling apart: his girlfriend has just left him, and his pet cat has just died of a bladder infection. One day he catches Eddie (Lombardo Boyar) in his apartment trying to rob him and ties the burglar up, but unexpectedly finds himself falling in love with Eddie. However, the film tones down the novel's original ending, in which Jimmy and Eddie team up to stage another crime and then run off together.

== Cast ==
- Lombardo Boyar as Eddie Tesoro
- Steve Guttenberg as Jimmy Zoole
- Cynthia Watros as Kate
- A.J. Benza as Carmine
- Tom Wright as Fred Gable
- Shirley Knight as Aunt Claire
- Kenneth Moskow as Stewart Thomas

== Reviews ==
On Metacritic, the film has a score of 33 out of 100 based on 11 reviews, indicating "generally unfavorable reviews". On Rotten Tomatoes, the film has an approval rating of 24% based on 17 reviews, with an average score of 4.5/10.
