= Josie Maran =

American model, actress, and entrepreneur (born 1978)

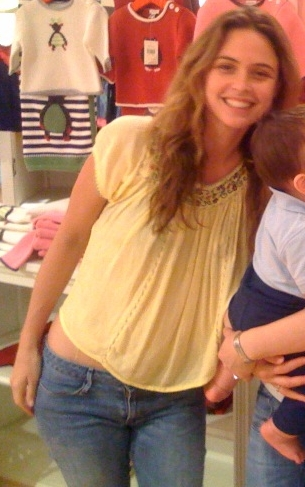
- Maran in 2008
- Born: Johanna Selhorst Maran; May 8, 1978 (age 48); Menlo Park, California, United States
- Occupations: Model; actress; entrepreneur
- Years active: 2002–2008 (acting); 2007–present (entrepreneur)
- Spouse: David Belle (m. 2018)
- Children: 2
- Modeling information
- Height: 5 ft 7.5 in (1.71 m)
- Hair color: Brown
- Eye color: Hazel
- Website: josiemarancosmetics.com

Johanna Selhorst "Josie" Maran (born May 8, 1978) is an American model, actress, and entrepreneur.

== Early life ==
Josie Maran was born May 8, 1978, in Menlo Park, California. Her father is of Russian Jewish ancestry and worked in green home construction. Her mother Roberta was an artist, interior decorator and had chronic fatigue syndrome, which inspired the family to live more healthily. She was raised in the San Francisco Bay Area.

Maran attended Castilleja School, an all-girls school in Palo Alto, California, from grades 7 to 12.

== Modeling and acting career ==
While she was still in high school, Maran was approached by a woman who asked her for a modeling performance in San Francisco, and a scouting agent encouraged her to pursue modeling professionally. In 1990 an appendectomy left Maran with a noticeable scar that is typically edited out of photos.

Signed at age 17 with the Elite modeling agency of Los Angeles, Maran appeared on her first cover with Glamour magazine in 1998; she was then the featured Guess? Girl in their summer 1998 and fall 1998 campaigns. After building a résumé of over 25 commercials and advertisements, including playing Howie D's companion in the music video of Backstreet Boys hit "Everybody (Backstreet's Back)", in which she was almost bitten on the neck by Count Dracula (played by Howie D), Maran moved cross-country to join with Elite in New York City. In 1999, she landed a multi-year deal with Maybelline. Maran appeared in the annual Sports Illustrated Swimsuit Issue for three consecutive years: from 2000 to 2002.

Maran's interest in music led her to play casually in two bands: Darling, with Nicole Richie, and Hollywood 2000, where she sang and played violin.

In 2001, Maran appeared in an independent film, as title character Mallory in The Mallory Effect. Maran followed this by appearing as Susan in Swatters in 2002. In 2004, she appeared in three films: As a French model in Little Black Book, as one of Dracula's brides, Marishka, in Van Helsing, and briefly as a cigarette girl in The Aviator. Maran appeared in a short film "The Confession" alongside Wentworth Miller in 2005, and as Kira Hayden in The Gravedancers in 2006.

Maran appeared in the street-racing video game Need for Speed: Most Wanted released in November 2005. She played Mia Townsend, who guides the player's character through the game.

Maran competed in the 2007 season of Dancing with the Stars, but she and dance partner Alec Mazo were the first couple eliminated.

== Josie Maran Cosmetics ==
In June 2007, Maran launched her own natural cosmetics product line, named Josie Maran Cosmetics. The company motto is "luxury with a conscience" and the main ingredient of the skincare and cosmetics is fair trade argan oil, grown and harvested by co-ops of Moroccan women.

Beyond her business activities she commits herself to the protection and improvement of nature and the environment.

== Personal life ==
Maran and her ex-partner, Iranian-American photographer Ali Alborzi, have two daughters, Rumi Joon (born 2006), and Indi Joon (born 2012). Maran married David Belle on August 26, 2018.

== Filmography ==
=== Film ===
Year	Title	Role	Notes
2002	The Mallory Effect	Mallory	
2002	Swatters	Susan	
2004	Van Helsing	Marishka the youngest bride	
2004	Little Black Book	Lulu Fritz	
2004	The Aviator	Thelma	
2005	The Confession	Wife	
2006	The Gravedancers	Kira Hayden	

=== Television ===
Year	Title	Role	Notes
2002	The Late Late Show with Craig Kilborn	Self	
2003	Jimmy Kimmel Live!	Self	
2004	Jimmy Kimmel Live!	Self	
2004	The Late Late Show with Craig Kilborn	Self	
2004	Late Night with Conan O'Brien	Self	
2005	Van Helsing: Behind the Screams		
2005	Jimmy Kimmel Live!	Self	
2007	Jimmy Kimmel Live!	Self	
2007	Dancing with the Stars	Self	eliminated in week one
2009	America's Next Top Model, Cycle 13	Guest judge	episode "Dance With Me" (October 7, 2009)

=== Miscellaneous ===
Year	Title	Type	Role	Notes
1997	"Everybody (Backstreet's Back)" by Backstreet Boys	Music video	Mina Harker	
2000	The Howard Stern Show	Radio	Self	(episode 13, December 2000).
2004	"Morning Light" by Truman	Music video		
2005	Need For Speed: Most Wanted	Video game	Mia Townsend	
