= The Convent (2000 film) =

- DVD cover
- Directed by: Mike Mendez
- Screenplay by: Chaton Anderson
- Produced by: Jed Nolan
- Starring: Joanna Canton; Adrienne Barbeau; Richard Trapp; Dax Miller
- Cinematography: Jason Lowe
- Edited by: John Rosenburg
- Music by: Joseph Bishara
- Production company: Alpine Pictures
- Release date: January 22, 2000 (Sundance Film Festival)
- Running time: 84 minutes
- Country: United States
- Language: English
- Budget: $500,000

The Convent is a 2000 horror film directed by Mike Mendez, starring horror veteran Adrienne Barbeau. It is about a group of college students who go into an abandoned convent, only to discover that it is inhabited by demons intent on possessing them. It premiered in January 2000 at the Sundance Film Festival. Due to the original distributor closing, the film was not released on home video until December 2002.

== Plot ==
A young woman named Christine breaks into a convent and kills every nun she comes across before setting fire to the place and leaving. The convent becomes an abandoned building and, years later, is a popular place for college students to break in and vandalize, as it is reported to be haunted. It is particularly popular for sororities and fraternities to break in and try to spray-paint their letters on the bell tower. One night, a young woman named Clorissa goes there with her friends. She is joined by her old goth friend Mo, her nerdy brother Brant, ex-fraternity brother Frijole, the cheerleader Kaitlin and her dog, and fraternity brothers Chad and Biff.

At the convent, Biff and Frijole start bullying Brant under the pretense that it is just routine hazing that all must go through to join the fraternity. The group begins to explore the convent but are stopped by the arrival of two police officers that force them to leave and take a cannabis joint that one of them had been holding. Scared to lose her scholarship if she is caught by the police, Mo decides to stay and hide in the convent, having persuaded Frijole to cover for her by promising him they would have sex. The group then goes to a diner, where Frijole says that they must return for Mo and a large stash of pot that he left in the convent.

In the convent, Mo is grabbed by a group of gothic Satanists who want to sacrifice her as part of a ritual to give its leader Saul power and summon Satan to Earth. While listening to the group talk to one another, Mo realizes that they have no idea what they are doing. She tries to talk them out of killing her, to no avail. After being stabbed in the heart, Mo is possessed by one of the demons that were already inhabiting the convent and begins slaying everyone in the group except Saul and Dickie-Boy, who manage to escape. The others return to the convent and are also murdered one by one, until only Clorissa and Brant remain. Saul kidnaps Brant to sacrifice him to Satan and send the demons back, but Brant escapes and Saul is killed and converted by the demons. Brant does not get far, as he and Dickie-Boy are taken by the demons to use them in a sacrifice.

Clorissa flees to the nearby house of a now-grown Christine, who reveals the full story of the convent, which also served as an orphanage and home for pregnant teens. Christine attacked the nuns and the priest running the place because they had become possessed by demons and intended to take her baby and use him to create the Anti-Christ. She saved her son, but had to spend years in a mental institution as a result. Every few years, college students break into the convent and become possessed by demons, but little comes of it because she fought them off and because none of them were virgins (meaning that Mo's claims of virginity were false), as only a virgin can become the Anti-Christ. Upon hearing that Brant is a virgin, Christine and Clorissa return to the convent. They fight off most of the demons but cannot stop them from killing Dickie-Boy (who was also a virgin), who becomes the Anti-Christ. Christine then urges Clorissa and Brant to flee, as she will blow up the convent with herself and the Anti-Christ inside. Clorissa and Brant escape the convent and find that the only other survivor is Kaitlin's dog, which Clorissa takes home with her. At home, Clorissa lies down on her bed before being attacked by the dog, as it was also possessed by a demon.

== Cast ==
- Joanna Canton as Clorissa
- Liam Kyle Sullivan as Brant
- Megahn Perry as Mo
- Richard Trapp as Frijole
- Jim Golden as Biff
- Dax Miller as Chad
- Chaton Anderson as Sapphira
- Renée Graham as Kaitlin
- Adrienne Barbeau as Adult Christine
- Kelly Mantle as Dickie-Boy
- David Gunn as Saul
- Coolio as Officer Starkey
- Bill Moseley as Officer Ray
- Oakley Stevenson as Young Christine

== Production ==
Convent's original script was written by Chaton Anderson with additional ideas contributed by director Mike Mendez. Anderson recalled that the script went back to her own childhood memories, recalling an eerie building she knew growing up that was a "religious home for runaway girls" that was abandoned for years. Anderson and her friends broke into it when they were either 14 or 15 recalling it as "the most dilapidated and sinister place I'd ever set foot in". Mendez recalled both Evil Dead 2 and Lamberto Bava's film Demons being an influence on Convent.

The film was shot in Los Angeles in 1999 and had a budget of half a million dollars from Alpine Pictures. It had a shooting schedule of 18 days.

== Release ==
The film was debuted at the Sundance Film Festival on January 22, 2000, as a special midnight screening. In 2018, Mendez reflected on the screening, recalling it to be "really fun" and said, "The whole festival run for that film was tremendous, to be honest. It kind of spoiled me. My future films had to live up to the festival experiences with The Convent, and often they didn't."

On initial festival screenings, Mendez said that audiences approached him who stated the film did not accurately showcase Satanists, to which Mendez responded, "We were just having fun. You're right, we didn't do our proper research, but if we did it wouldn't be as funny. The Convent is an equal opportunity offender." Mendez also spoke about a critic who approached him about the film's only homosexual character who one character is afraid of, and then having him become the Antichrist. Mendez responded that the critic was "looking too deeply into it. There is no message".

The film was given an NC-17 rating from the MPAA. Mendez recalled the issue was the film being "too bloody" and it was re-sent and re-edited twice to the MPAA to get an R-Rating. The film was cut by 19 seconds for this rating.

The Convent was originally set to be released by the distributor A-Pix who went defunct. The film had been released as a bootleg prior to this on eBay and at horror conventions. It was released on VHS and DVD on December 11, 2002, by Trimark.

In November 2023, it was announced that Synapse Films was releasing The Convent in 4K and Blu-ray in its uncut form, remastered under the supervision of Mike Mendez.

== Reception ==
Critical reception for The Convent has been mixed.
