= Kenny Blank =

American actor (born 1977)

- Born: Kenneth Michael Benbow Blank; September 15, 1977 (age 48); New York City, U.S.
- Other name: Kenn Michael
- Education: University of Southern California
- Occupations: Actor; composer; editor; director; producer
- Years active: 1991–present
- Parent: Warren Benbow (father)

Kenny Blank (born September 15, 1977), also known as Kenn Michael, is an American actor, composer, director, editor, and producer. He is best known for his role as Michael Peterson in the television series The Parent 'Hood from 1995 to 1997 for which he also composed some music, as well as his appearance in Eddie Murphy's 1992 film, Boomerang.

== Early life ==
Blank was born as Kenneth Michael Benbow Blank in New York City on September 15, 1977, the son of Lola, a dancer for James Brown who later became Blank's manager, and Warren Benbow, a jazz drummer who has worked with Miles Davis and Stevie Wonder. His parents later divorced and Blank was raised by his mother and stepfather, Bob Blank, who owned a music studio.

By the time he was 6 years old, Blank played the piano and made short films. He graduated from Stamford High School in 1995. In the late 1990s, Blank was a student at the University of Southern California, where he studied filmmaking.

== Career ==
Blank began acting at the age of 7. As a child, Blank reviewed the book Jumanji on Reading Rainbow in the episode about the Macy's Thanksgiving Day Parade. He also narrated Bill Martin Jr.'s "Knots on a Counting Rope" with Joseph Ruben Silverbird. His major breakthrough was his role as Tito in the 1991 Joe Pesci film The Super. For his performance as Tito, Blank was nominated for a Young Artist Award in 1992 in the Best Young Actor Co-starring in a Motion Picture category.

When he was 13 years old, he portrayed Linus Bragg in the made-for TV film Carolina Skeletons (or The End of Silence), based on the life of George Stinney, an African-American boy who was wrongfully convicted of murder and executed at the age of 14. Blank had a small role in the feature film Boomerang (1992) and appeared in the miniseries Alex Haley's Queen.

He was a series regular on the short-lived sitcom Tall Hopes (1993), playing aspiring director Ernest Harris. Although the series received poor reviews, Blank's performance as Ernest was well received. He portrayed teenager Michael Peterson in the sitcom The Parent 'Hood in the mid-1990s, also composing songs for the series. Blank left the series after its third season.

Blank acted in Silent Story and Delivering Milo. Notable guest appearances on television shows include roles in Hangin' with Mr. Cooper, Moesha, City of Angels, Living Single, and Freaks and Geeks. He also appeared as Jordy in the direct-to-video horror comedy Boltneck.

As a voice actor, Blank provided the voice of the character Darren Patterson on the Nickelodeon animated series As Told by Ginger (2000–06), as well as earning a small role in All Grown Up!, as Sulky Boy's band member J.T. He appears in the Saints Row video game series as one of the selectable voices of the Boss, the main character of the series. Blank provided the English dub voice of Angelino in Mutafukaz. He is also the English dub voice of Philly the Kid in Cannon Busters.

== Other careers ==
Since 1998, Blank has cinematographed, edited and directed a number of short films. He made his directorial debut in 1999 on the theme song for Mystery Men. Blank exhibited an experimental film, Manifested Intent, at the Urbanworld Film Festival. In 2019, Blank directed the television film In Broad Daylight for TV One.

During the 1990s, he also worked as a composer, creating songs on The Montel Williams Show and providing the title theme for The Super. As a teenager, he contributed music to Kodak, Lego and commercials for other companies.

== Filmography ==
=== Film ===
Year	Title	Role	Notes
1991	The Super	Tito	
1992	Boomerang	Kenny	
1998	Dead Man on Campus	Luke	
2000	Boltneck	Jordy	
2001	Delivering Milo	Mr. Ralph	
2001	Evolution	Student	
2001	Silent Story		Short film
2005	Ganked	Marcus	Independent film
2005	The Legend of Frosty the Snowman	Walter Wader (voice)	Direct-to-video
2006	All You've Got		Composer
2017	Mutafukaz	Angelino (voice)	

=== Television ===
Year	Title	Role	Notes
1993	Hangin' with Mr. Cooper	Henry	1 episode
1993	Homicide: Life on the Street	James Hill	1 episode
1993	Alex Haley's Queen	Henry at 11	1 episode
1993	Tall Hopes	Ernest Harris	6 episodes
1995–1997	The Parent 'Hood	Michael Peterson	Seasons 1–3
1997	Living Single	Damon Barker	1 episode
1999-2000	Pepper Ann	Lamar Abu-Dabe (voice), Malik (additional voices)	4 episodes
2000–2016	As Told by Ginger	Darren Patterson, additional voices (voice)	32 episodes
2002	Static Shock	Jump, Joe (voices)	2 episodes
2003	All Grown Up!	J.T. (voice)	Episode: "Tweenage Tycoons"
2019	Cannon Busters	Philly the Kid (voice)	12 episodes; English dub
2023	Teen Titans Go!	Dracula (voice)	Episode: "Looking for Love"

=== Video games ===
Year	Title	Role
2004	Grand Theft Auto: San Andreas	Pedestrian
2006	Saints Row	Playa Voice 2 / Stilwater's Resident / Radio Voice
2006	Company of Heroes	Voice
2007	Company of Heroes: Opposing Fronts	Aldrich
2007	Power Rangers: Super Legends	Navy Thunder Ranger
2008	Saints Row 2	Male Voice 2
2011	Saints Row: The Third	Male Voice 2
2013	Saints Row IV	Male Voice 2
2015	Saints Row: Gat out of Hell	Male Voice 2
