= Silent Story =

- Directed by: Eduardo Cisneros
- Written by: Eduardo Cisneros
- Starring: Megahn Perry; David Fickas
- Release date: 2001

Silent Story is a 2001 film which was written and directed by Eduardo Cisneros. It is a fantasy-comedy/sci-fi film and was released in November 2001. It is rated 7.8 stars on IMDB.

It stars Megahn Perry as Rose and David Fickas as Eddie. The film won Best Short at the Los Angeles Latino International Film Festival in 2001.
