= Big Ass Spider! =

2013 film by Mike Mendez

- Theatrical release poster
- Directed by: Mike Mendez
- Written by: Gregory Gieras
- Produced by: Shaked Berenson; Patrick Ewald; Travis Stevens; Klaus von Sayn-Wittgenstein
- Starring: Greg Grunberg; Lin Shaye; Patrick Bauchau; Ray Wise; Clare Kramer; Lombardo Boyar
- Cinematography: Benji Bakshi
- Edited by: Mike Mendez
- Music by: Ceiri Torjussen
- Production company: Epic Pictures Group
- Distributed by: Epic Pictures Releasing
- Release date: October 18, 2013
- Running time: 80 minutes
- Country: United States
- Language: English

Big Ass Spider! is a 2013 science fiction action film directed and edited by Mike Mendez. The film tells the story of a bug exterminator, who, with the help of a hospital security guard and the military, battles a giant spider that goes on a rampage in Los Angeles.

== Plot ==
Alex Mathis is a cash-strapped but good-natured exterminator working in Los Angeles. While helping an elderly woman with a rodent problem, he is bitten by a brown recluse spider and is treated at a hospital. Meanwhile, a mortician is bitten by a rodent-sized spider that crawls out of a dead body which just arrived at the hospital. Learning of this, Alex offers to take care of the spider in exchange for clearing his hospital bill. José Ramos, a hospital security guard, offers to help Alex. Going to the morgue, Alex deduces the spider escaped into an air vent. He enters the vent and communicates with José via walkie-talkie. Meanwhile, a U.S. military task force led by Major Braxton Tanner and Lieutenant Karly Brant show up at the hospital to examine the dead body the spider burst out of.

Meanwhile, the spider, growing exponentially, kills a paralyzed hospital patient. Back inside the vent, Alex stumbles upon a spiderweb and learns that it is highly flammable. Alex ventures into the hospital basement, where he has a confrontation with the spider. The spider is driven off by Karly and escapes into a grate down into the sewer, where it sprays acid at a homeless man, killing him. Alex, enamored with Karly, offers his assistance to Braxton, who declines, especially when Alex presses her for answers on where the spider came from. Braxton learns that footage of the spider is now on the news as José convinces Alex to continue their pursuit as it could be the most important thing of their lives.

The duo tracks the still-growing spider at a public park, where it kills dozens of people. Alex and José get the spider to chase their truck and lure it to the military. A huge firefight ensues, but the spider escapes into the nearby woods. Karly and a group of soldiers pursue it, but the spider ambushes them, killing most of the soldiers and capturing Karly. After Alex and José demand answers, Braxton reveals that they discovered alien DNA and hoped to use it as a growth hormone. However, a spider's nest was hidden in some test fruit, thus exposing the spider to the alien DNA and triggering its rapid growth. It is also revealed that the spider will soon start reproducing based on its size and their studies of the alien DNA.

Alex and José head for the city, as the now-enormous spider sets up a nest at the U.S. Bank Tower. As they enter the skyscraper, Braxton informs them that Karly is located directly inside the nest, and warns them of an impending airstrike. They get to Karly and free her and several other trapped citizens just before the hatching baby spiders can attack. The group makes it out of the building seconds before the airstrike hits, provoking the spider. Alex deduces from the spiderwebs' flammability that the spider could be killed by shooting its spinneret. José grabs a rocket launcher from a military vehicle and tosses it to Alex, who shoots the spider in the spinneret. The spider explodes, finally killing it. Alex embraces Karly, and the two passionately kiss.

In a mid-credits scene, Braxton calls Alex to tell him they have another problem. In the background, a giant cockroach can be seen climbing the Statue of Liberty in a video monitor.

== Cast ==
- Greg Grunberg as Alex Mathis
- Clare Kramer as Lieutenant Karly Brant
- Lombardo Boyar as Jose Ramos
- Ray Wise as Major Braxton Tanner
- Lin Shaye as Mrs. Jefferson
- Patrick Bauchau as Lucas
- Lloyd Kaufman as Himself
- Alexis Kendra as Nurse Lisa (Alexis Peters)
- Adam Gierasch as Homeless Man
- James C. Mathis as Street Cop

== Production ==
Big Ass Spider! was directed by Mike Mendez. It stars Lin Shaye, Ray Wise, Patrick Bauchau and Clare Kramer. To cast extras for the film, Mendez used people from his Facebook friends list, as he did not have enough money for paid extras. The film's screenplay was originally called Dino Spider. Distributors pushed for the film to be retitled Mega Spider, as they felt that Big Ass Spider! would not be marketable. However, Mendez convinced the distributors to keep the title, feeling that Big Ass Spider! "is the right title for the movie. I felt it in my heart and soul."

== Reception ==
On Rotten Tomatoes the film has a 78% approval rating based on reviews from 27 critics. The site's consensus states: "Big Ass Spider! delivers on the promise of its outlandish title with a tongue-in-cheek creature feature that embraces its B-movie silliness with utterly entertaining result". On Metacritic it has a score of 53 out of a 100 based on reviews from 9 critics, indicating "mixed or average" reviews.

Scott Foundas of Variety gave a positive review, calling the film "an exceedingly good-natured Z-grade creature feature." He went on to write that "Many worse ways to spend 80 minutes can easily be imagined." Bill Goodykoontz of The Arizona Republic opined that the film was "gleefully schlocky" but criticized the film for being predictable. John DeFore of The Hollywood Reporter wrote positively of the film, saying "Mike Mendez's shamelessly Corman-esque Big Ass Spider! does almost everything just a tiny bit better than it needs to."

Neil Genzlinger of The New York Times gave a negative review of the film, branding it as a "humorless horror comedy". He concluded by saying that "the director, Mike Mendez, shows no signs of knowing how to make campy horror work the way that the creators of similar movies on Syfy do. It has to be either subtle or over the top. This is neither." Rex Reed rated the film a 1 out of 4, saying that it was "lazily directed" and "aims for satire and settles for stale shtick".

== Release ==
On October 18, 2013, the film was released on demand and into a limited number of theaters by Epic Pictures Releasing. It was released on DVD and Blu-ray on January 7, 2014. Its home media release earned it a Saturn Award for Best DVD or Blu-ray.
