= The Last Heist =

- Directed by: Mike Mendez
- Written by: Guy Stevenson
- Produced by: Rick Benattar; Nigel Thomas
- Starring: Henry Rollins; Torrance Coombs; Victoria Pratt
- Cinematography: Jan-Michael Losada
- Edited by: Mike Mendez; Laurens Van Charante
- Music by: Alexander Bornstein
- Production companies: Benattar/Thomas Productions; Parkside Pictures; Tadross Media Group; DH Films
- Distributed by: XLrator Media
- Release date: June 17, 2016
- Running time: 84 minutes
- Country: United States
- Language: English

The Last Heist is a 2016 American action thriller film directed by Mike Mendez and written by Guy Stevenson starring Henry Rollins, Torrance Coombs and Victoria Pratt.

== Plot ==
Bernard (Henry Rollins) arrives at a small bank in Los Angeles to withdraw his belongings from a safety deposit box due to the bank closing down. He meets the mild-mannered employee Danny (Michael Aaron Milligan), his manager Mark (John O'Brien), the elderly Ms. Waxman (Fay DeWitt) and Cynthia (Courtney Compton). Bernard insists that he is seen to before the other customers, and, intimidated, Cynthia allows Danny to show him to his safety deposit box before her. Shortly afterwards, a group of bank robbers led by Paul (Torrance Coombs), Washington (Mykel Shannon Jenkins), Biggs (Nick Principe), and Rick (Ken Lyle), arrive to rob the bank. While Rick stays in the van in order to keep lookout, the rest of the group storm the bank and take Mark, Ms Waxman and Cynthia hostage. Hearing the commotion, Danny leaves Bernard alone, who then removes several human eyeballs from his safety deposit box.

Arriving upstairs, Danny is also taken hostage, while recognizing his long estranged brother Paul as one of the robbers. AJ (Mark Kelly) and Ally (Camilla Jackson) take the hostages to a back room and keep guard. However, during a momentary lack of concentration from the robbers, Danny is able to text 911 and summon Detective Pascal (Victoria Pratt) to the scene, along with a few rookie cops. Pascal questions Paul at the front door who convinces her the text was not sent from the bank, however Pascal remains suspicious and quickly takes a photo of him to send to her station for identification. While leaving, Pascal finds Rick snorting cocaine in the van, prompting Rick to try and escape into the bank. Realizing he is not going to make it, he pulls his gun, only for Pascal to shoot him twice in the chest, severely injuring him. Paul, Washington and Biggs open fire on the officers and manage to drag the injured Rick inside of the bank. Shortly afterward, a number of patrol cars show up, including Pascal's boss Franklin (Robert Craighead). Meanwhile, Tracey (Kristina Klebe) goes into the vault to collect the money and look for the missing civilian, Bernard. After not being able to find him, Tracey gathers money and items of value in a large bag. As she is about to return to the group, Bernard attacks her, stabbing her multiple times and gouging out her eyes.

Paul quickly goes looking for Tracey and finds her corpse in the vault. He alerts the others that Tracey has been murdered, presumably by the missing civilian who is believed to be making his way around through the vents. He enters back into the lobby area with the bag of money. Ms. Waxman pleads with the robbers to allow her to use the restroom, and reluctantly Ally agrees. While waiting outside, Ally becomes impatient and enters the bathroom, only to find Ms. Waxman dead with her eyes gouged out. She is soon attacked by Bernard who stabs her to death. Biggs leaves the group to locate a hidden elevator within the bank which will allow the group to escape through the bank's basement and out a back door. Realizing Rick will not survive much longer, Paul attempts to bargain with Pascal and demands a medic for Rick and a school bus for the group's escape. Soon afterward, a group of men in tactical gear, including Smith (Cris D'Annunzio) and Sinclair (John J. York), arrive on the scene. They identify as United States Department of Defense contractors and convince Pascal and Franklin that they have been chasing Paul all over the country as he has been making large scale robberies. Smith enters the bank as the demanded medic, but is immediately recognized as one of Sinclair's men. Angered, the robbers keep Smith hostage and allow Cynthia to leave with the injured Rick. While watching Smith alone in the back room, AJ encounters Bernard. However, Sinclair's sniper believes Bernard to be a civilian hostage and shoots AJ dead when he raises his gun to him. Bernard then murders Smith, and soon after Biggs by hitting him in the head with an axe.

Sinclair decides to storm the bank with his men, along with Pascal. Upon entering the bank there is a gunfight with Washington and Mark being murdered. Sinclair encounters Paul and it is revealed Sinclair and his men are part of a drug cartel and are also planning on robbing the bank, having been beat to their objective by Paul and his gang. Sinclair shoots Paul dead before Pascal is shot in the neck. Pascal survives her injuries and shoots Sinclair's remaining men, while Sinclair escapes with the bag of money into the basement through the elevator located by Biggs earlier. Danny takes Pascal's gun as she dies from her wounds and goes after Sinclair. Bernard attacks Sinclair in the basement but Sinclair is able to get away, dropping a knife as he does so. Danny arrives in the basement and is also attacked by Bernard, but is able to reach the knife and stab Bernard to incapacitate him. Sinclair makes it outside and is quickly caught by Danny, who reveals he is also working for a drug cartel to protect the money in the bank. He then shoots Sinclair and leaves with the money. Bernard appears and attacks Danny, repeatedly stabs him before gouging out his eyes and putting them in his jar with the others. He then makes his escape out of the back of the bank with the money and his jars of eyeballs.

== Cast ==
- Henry Rollins as Bernard, a soft-spoken serial killer
- Torrance Coombs as Paul
- Michael Aaron Milligan as Danny
- Victoria Pratt as Pascal
- Mykel Shannon Jenkins as Washington
- Nick Principe as Biggs
- Mark Kelly as AJ
- Ken Lyle as Rick
- Kristina Klebe as Tracey
- John O'Brien as Mark
- John J. York as Sinclair
- Camilla Jackson as Ally
- Fay DeWitt as Ms. Waxman
- Courtney Compton as Cynthia
- Cris D'Annunzio as Smith
- Robert Craighead as Franklin

== Release ==
The films was released on June 17, 2016 in the United States.

== Reception ==
The film was panned with a 11% out of 9 reviews on Rotten Tomatoes. Simon Abrams of RogerEbert.com gave the film one star stating the "movie feels like it ran out of money on day two, and everybody but the people in front of the camera knew it." Owen Gleiberman of Variety praised Henry Rollins' portrayal of the serial killer as "the only reason to see this slipshod indie bank-hostage thriller."
