= Liam Kyle Sullivan =

American comedian, musician, actor, and director

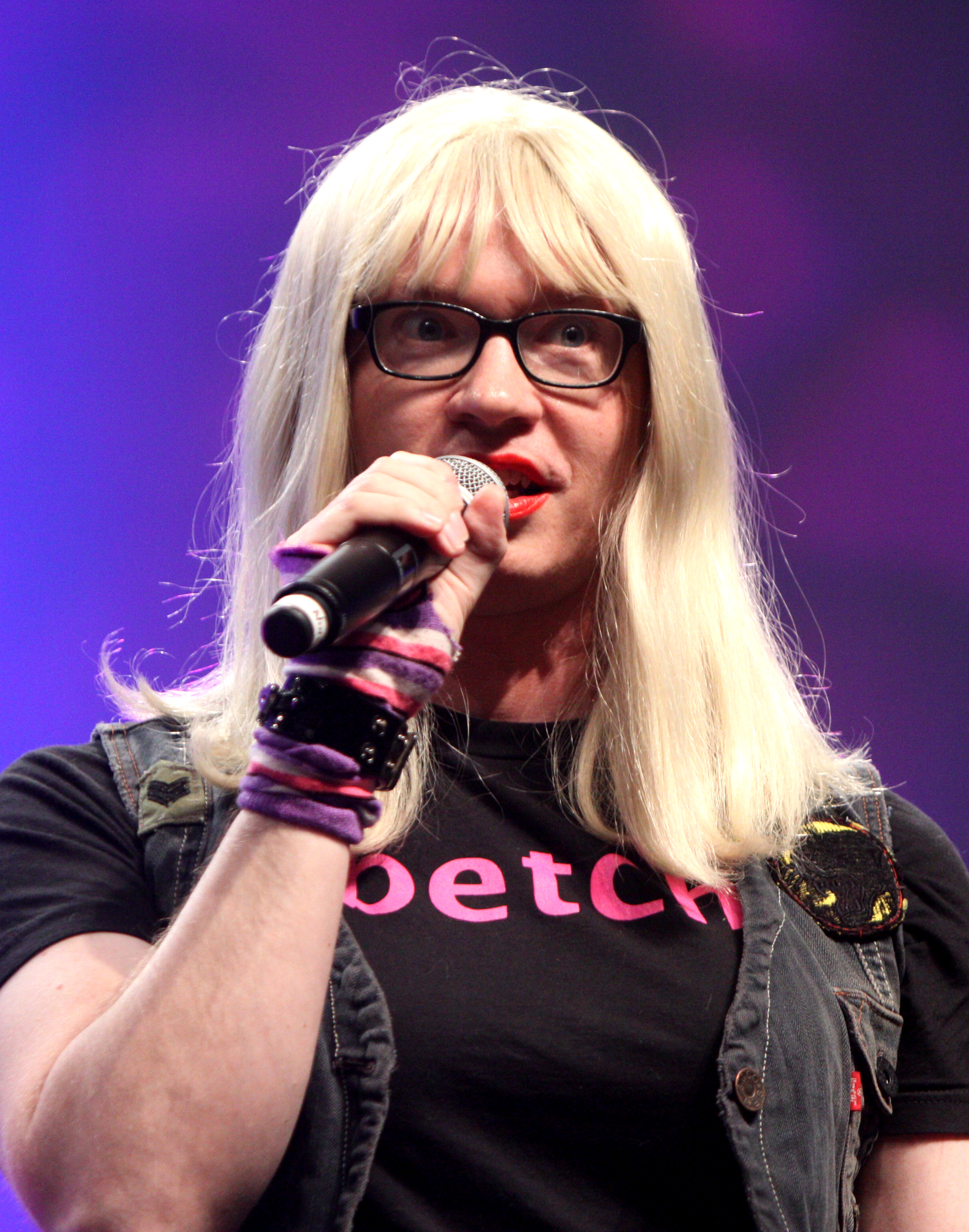
- Sullivan as Kelly in June 2012
- Born: July 17, 1973 (age 53); Norfolk, Massachusetts, U.S.
- Occupations: Comedian; musician; actor; director
- Years active: 1997–present
- Children: 2
- Musical career
- Also known as: Kelly; Susan Walker
- Genres: Comedy hip hop; electroclash; electronic rock; rap rock; rapcore; country
- Instrument: Vocals
- Label: TuneCore
- Website: liamshow.com

Liam Kyle Sullivan (born July 17, 1973) is an American comedian, musician, actor, and director. He is best known for his YouTube comedy videos, particularly as a female character named Kelly, and was one of YouTube's first breakout stars. The music video for his song "Shoes", performed as Kelly, became one of YouTube's first viral videos.

== Career ==
=== Comedy ===
Sullivan is best known for his character Kelly, who is portrayed by a cross-dressing Sullivan and released an album entitled Shoes. He won the 2008 People's Choice Award for User Generated Video for the Kelly music video "Shoes". Kelly's music videos have featured guest stars such as Margaret Cho, Amanda Palmer, Dave Navarro, Lisa Nova, and Ask a Ninja. Another of Sullivan's characters, Kelly's aunt Susan Walker, also released the country album Susan Walker's Greatest Tits. He has also worked as an editor for Smosh. In 2016, he made an appearance on the Fine Brothers' YouTube channel in a video called "YouTubers react to Shoes (Viral Video Classic)". In 2020, he posted his first YouTube video in seven years called "Masks", returning to the Kelly character in a sketch parodying "Shoes" and encouraging people to wear face masks during the COVID-19 pandemic.

=== Acting ===
In 1997, Sullivan briefly appeared in the Buffy the Vampire Slayer episode "Reptile Boy" as a cross-dressing fraternity pledge. In 2000, he starred as Brant in the horror film The Convent. In 2004, he appeared in the 8 Simple Rules episodes "Mall in the Family" and "Finale Part Un" as Zack; in 2005, he returned in the episode "Freaky Friday" as Dorkie Dwaine McDoogle. Later that year, he appeared in the Gilmore Girls episode "Wedding Bellblues" as a photographer. In 2007, he appeared as Kelly in The Dresden Dolls' music video for "Shores of California". He also appeared as Kelly in the VH1 series I Hate My 30's, performing "Forget It, Just Get It!"

In 2008, Sullivan appeared as Kelly in the Weezer music video for "Pork and Beans", which also featured many other internet stars. He also appeared at the LOGO Network's NewNowNext Awards as Kelly, and opened for Margaret Cho's "Beautiful" Tour throughout the year, playing Kelly and several other characters. In 2010, his song "My Romantic Pattern" was featured in the season 1 episode "One Cold Swim Away" of the comedy drama Gravity.

== Discography ==
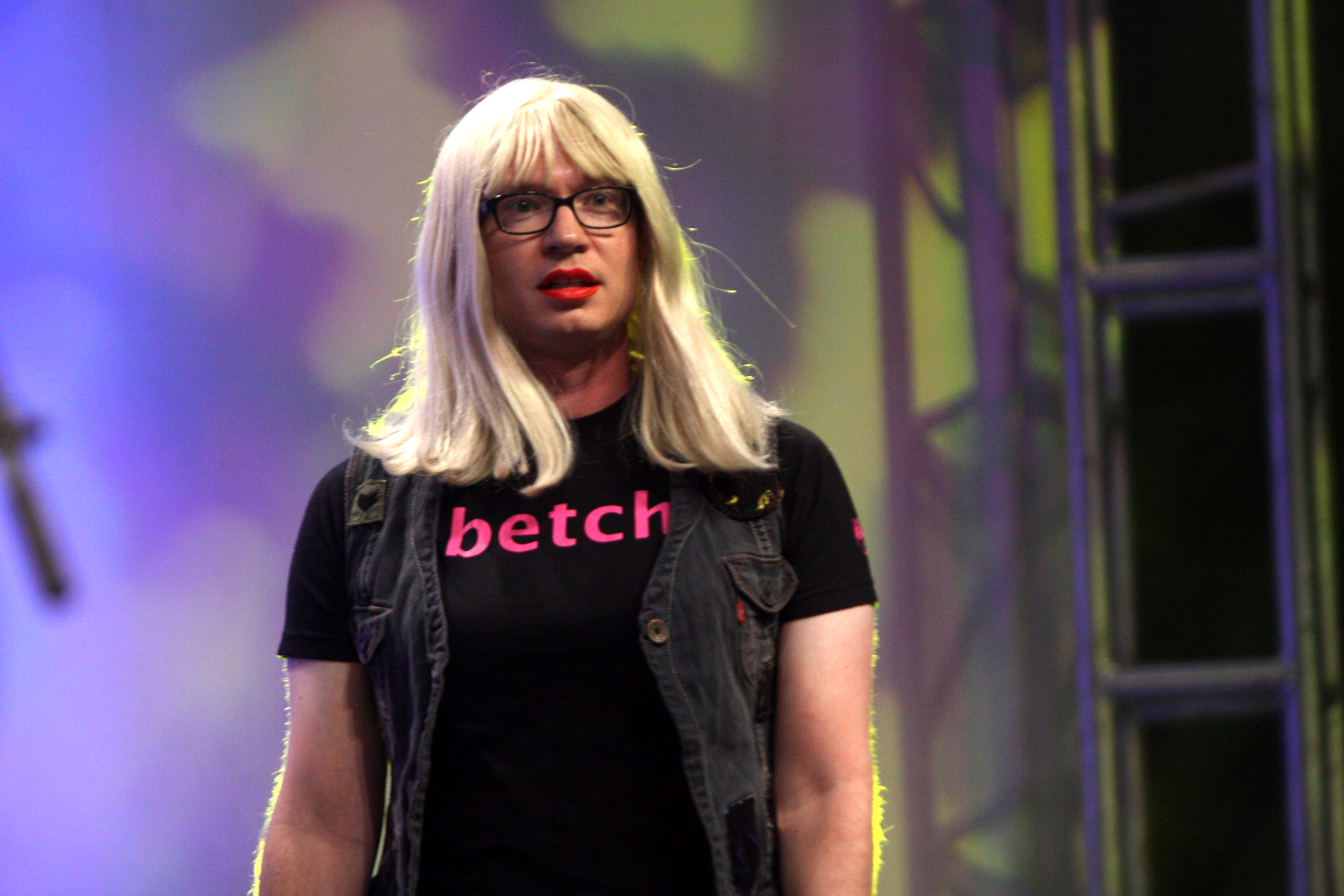
Sullivan as Kelly in June 2012

=== Albums ===
- Shoes (2006)
- Susan Walker's Greatest Tits (2009)

=== Music videos ===
Year	Title	Notes
2006	"Shoes"	
2006	"Txt Msg Brkup"	
2007	"Let Me Borrow That Top"	
2008	"No Booty Calls"	Sequel to "Txt Msg Brkup"
2008	"Where Do You Think You're Going in That?"	
2009	"What R U Guys Talking About?"	Also released under the title "Kelly: The Prequel"
2009	"I Like to Tinker"	
2009	"Shut Up and F*ck Me"	
2020	"Masks"	

=== Other videos ===
- "Love Letters" (2006)
- "Muffins" (2006)
- "Dr. Ulee Sex Therapist" (2009)
- ”Breakfast Loaves” (2022)
