= Secret Truths =

- South of Nowhere episodes
- Spencer (right) meets Ashley in the school gym.
- Episode nos.: Season 1 Episodes 1/2
- Directed by: Donna Deitch
- Written by: Thomas W. Lynch
- Production code: 101/102
- Original air date: November 4, 2005

Guest appearances
- John Eric Bentley as Coach; Marcus Brown as Dallas; Edward Cannan as Counsellor; Aasha Davis as Chelsea; Marisa Lauren as Sherry; Dinah Lenney as Teacher; Dustin Meier as Cop #1; Quentin Prescott Price as Boz; Darryl Reed Jr. as Zak

Episode chronology
← Previous —	Next → "Friends, Lovers, Brothers, and Others"

"Secret Truths" is the two-part premiere episode of the American teen drama series South of Nowhere. It premiered on November 4, 2005 on Noggin's teen-targeted programming block, The N. It was written by series creator Thomas W. Lynch and directed by Donna Deitch. The episode introduces three siblings—Spencer, Glen and Clay Carlin—who start at a new school after their family moves from a small town in Ohio to Los Angeles.

Lynch conceived South of Nowhere from the idea of a teenager's coming out after hearing that his friend's son had come out to his parents. Lynch pitched the premise to Noggin LLC and was commissioned to write the pilot. After the casting process was complete, the episode was filmed in October 2004, but when the show was picked up for a full season, Lynch decided to recast many of the characters and the pilot was shot again in July 2005 with the new cast. The premiere of the episode was promoted with branded MetroCards that were handed out to teenagers in Manhattan. Generally, critics reviewed the pilot positively, particularly commending its treatment of current social issues; however, some critics found the show's introduction of these issues to be forced and inauthentic.

== Plot ==
After their mother Paula (Maeve Quinlan) takes on a new job, the Carlin family moves from a small town in Ohio to Los Angeles, California. The three Carlin siblings start at King High School, where they each try to fit in. Glen (Chris Hunter), a talented basketball player, tries out for the school basketball team, upsetting the star player Aiden Dennison (Matt Cohen) and his cheerleader girlfriend Madison Duarte (Valery Ortiz). Tensions between Glen and Aiden escalate into a locker room fight over Aiden's ex-girlfriend Ashley Davies (Mandy Musgrave), and Glen takes the spotlight in his first game, leaving Aiden on the bench. Glen's sister Spencer (Gabrielle Christian) joins the cheerleading squad but ends up doing little more than take orders from Madison. She befriends the rebellious Ashley, but when Ashley indicates her interest in girls, Spencer starts to avoid her, only to admit later that she enjoyed their time spent together. That night, though, she dreams of being taunted by the cheerleaders and called gay, although she denies it. Glen and Spencer's adopted African American brother Clay (Danso Gordon) is smart but naïve, and he finds himself facing the racial tensions of LA that he never experienced in Ohio. After Clay strikes up a conversation with a girl named Chelsea Lewis (Aasha Davis), he is beaten up by her ex-boyfriend Dallas (Marcus Brown) when Clay tries to defend her. He then earns the respect of Sean Miller (Austen Parros), who is cynical about the way African Americans are treated in society, and when they go driving they are pulled over by the police for "driving while black".

At a school dance, Sean persuades Dallas to make peace with Clay while Clay dances with Chelsea. Spencer convinces Ashley to come despite her disdain for school dances, but when Madison sees them together, she alleges that Spencer is gay and kicks Spencer off the cheerleading squad. It is revealed that Ashley was once pregnant by Aiden and lost the baby in a miscarriage, and when Glen tries to force Spencer to leave, another fight breaks out between him and Aiden. Spencer and Ashley flee the dance with Aiden and end up at a lookout over LA.

== Production ==
Thomas W. Lynch first had the idea for South of Nowhere when one of his close conservative friends told Lynch that his son had just come out to him. The man asked his son, "How do you know you're gay?" and the son responded, "How do you know you're straight?" When Lynch heard this, he says, he "knew there was a series in there about identity." He wondered why such a noteworthy event—an adolescent's coming out to their parents—had never before been explored as an ongoing subject on a television series. He "sat with the idea for a few days" and then wrote an outline of the show's pilot over a few weeks. In an effort to maintain authenticity in depicting teenage experiences, Lynch spoke to high school counselors and asked drama students at a Los Angeles high school for feedback. He pitched the series—which he was then calling "Out"—to Noggin LLC executives Amy Friedman and Essie Chambers, who then commissioned him to write the pilot script.

Gabrielle Christian first auditioned for the role of Spencer (then called "Zooey") in July 2004, though Lynch also had her read for Ashley's part. Mandy Musgrave also auditioned for the role of Spencer, but Lynch liked her chemistry with Christian, so he paired the two up with Musgrave as Ashley. The pilot was first shot in October 2004 and directed by Rose Troche. After the series was picked up by Noggin for its teen block, The N, in January 2005, Lynch decided to recast many of the characters. He said that "I didn't pick [Christian] up right away, I had her keep re-auditioning. ... I [had] to make sure that this combination [was] perfect." Her contract was finally picked up in May 2005 and the pilot was re-filmed with the new cast in July. Filming took place in Los Angeles, with a correctional facility used largely as the high school set. Donna Deitch, who directed the second version of the pilot but no subsequent South of Nowhere episodes said that the pilot is "something I'm really, really proud of, because I think that show has a look, a style to it that really helps". She felt that the style she set suited the material and was "fairly inventive" for a low-budget series.

== Promotion ==
Before the airing of the pilot, The N joined with marketing agency Mr. Youth LLC to promote the show amongst teenagers in Manhattan. On Thursday November 3 and Friday November 4, 2005, street teams with chest-mounted televisions as well as branded Vespas were dispersed around lower Manhattan. They visited various high schools and offered South of Nowhere-branded MetroCards to teenagers who were traveling south on the N subway line.

== Reception ==
Most reviews of "Secret Truths" were positive, particularly praising its treatment of social issues. Maureen Ryan wrote for the Chicago Tribune that "The lack of either cutesyness or condescension shown by this program is promising." She also commended that the pilot "doesn't shy away" from issues pertaining to race, religion and sexuality. Kate Authur of The New York Times compared the pilot positively to other series, writing, "If you took the plot of Beverly Hills, 90210 (a good-looking Midwestern family moves to Los Angeles), combined it with the identity issues of Degrassi (race, sexuality and class clash in a high school setting) and added a splash of One Tree Hill's basketball backdrop, you would get South of Nowhere ... That's meant to be a compliment." Alessandra Stanley, another critic for The New York Times, mentioned "Secret Truths" in a feature about racial issues on television. She felt that the pilot distinguished itself from other teen shows by including a subplot about race; however, she still found it to be "constrained and politically correct". Variety's Brian Lowry gave the episode a lukewarm review, comparing it to other teen dramas. He wrote that "the web of relationships doesn't feel particularly fresh, mirroring the recent spate of nighttime teen serials", but he felt the pilot was an "edgier treatment", noting that it "isn't screwing around" by addressing topics including abortion, drugs, homosexuality and racism. Karman Kregloe of AfterEllen.com, a website focused on the portrayal of lesbians in the media, thought that the episode was "well-written, and the storyline for each of the lead characters is compelling". She praised the show greatly for its authentic portrayal of teenagers' questioning of their sexuality and the "big step" taken towards promoting tolerance.

Other critics responded to the episode less positively. Joanna Weiss of The Boston Globe was more critical, feeling that the show "takes pains to introduce as many hot-button issues as possible" to give the illusion of authenticity. She found the characters to be predictable and to only serve as "plot vehicles". The Seattle Times' Kay McFadden also found a main problem of the show in the characters, believing that the pilot was more focused on plot development than it was on character development. She felt that the show was slightly hypocritical in trying to educate viewers on moral values but at the same time emphasising its own sexual aspects, setting "a weird standard for young viewers".
