= Ashley Davies =

- Portrayed by: Mandy Musgrave
- Duration: 2005–08
- First appearance: "Secret Truths"
- Last appearance: "On the Precipice"
In-universe information
- Occupation: Seasons 1–2 - Student (G.E.D.); Season 3 - Musician, heiress
- Parents: Christine Davies; Raife Davies (deceased)
- Half-sisters: Kyla Woods
- Wife: Spencer Carlin
- Children: Clay - son with Spencer; Child with Aiden (miscarriage)

Ashley Davies is a fictional character from the television series South of Nowhere, a television series produced by Noggin LLC for its teen block, The N. Ashley is in a romantic relationship with the lead character, Spencer Carlin. She attended King High School before she got a $12.5 million inheritance, and is portrayed by actress Mandy Musgrave.

A rebellious narcissist who is at times known to refuse the conformity of labels such as straight or gay, the character has emerged as an icon among teenagers and young adults.

== Background ==
=== Casting and characterization ===
Actress Mandy Musgrave had originally auditioned for the role of Spencer Carlin. Spencer would eventually become her onscreen love interest, portrayed by actress Gabrielle Christian. When describing her auditioning process, Musgrave explained the casting directors swapping the roles between her and her co-star. She found it "weird", but relayed their "immediate" chemistry. I had forgotten my sides and she knew all of her lines," she said, "and we were going up for the same character — Spencer then was known as 'Zooey'. We went in there and I thought 'Crap, this girl is amazing! She so has the part, I don't know my lines and I'm not prepared.'" Musgrave continued, "She knew her lines, so she gave me her sides. But then when they started matching us up, they put me up for the character of Ashley. I thought, 'I'm so unprofessional, this girl has the part. Why am I here?' But they kept bringing us in together and loving our chemistry and we became lovers at first sight!"

Ashley's background was revealed to show her as the rich, detached daughter of '80s rock royalty. It is Ashley who broadens Spencer's horizon, opening her up to a grittier world, her sexuality and her first love.

At first characterized as "the girl who is always the first to build walls" and deflect emotion with sarcasm, Ashley matures and softens through being with Spencer as their relationship grows. Her bad girl aspect are left intact, along with the reality that at any moment she can "break the heart" of the person closest to her.

In addition, Ashley is written to know who she is, who she likes and what she wants. There is nothing artificial or contrived about her presence. Far from a plot device or stereotype, she exudes confidence around everyone, except for when she is alone with Spencer. Spencer's innocence continually manages to intrigue Ashley, allowing her to be vulnerable and insecure. This bares Ashley's emotions in a real and heartfelt way to let Spencer in, and is what makes their relationship as new to Ashley as it becomes to Spencer, later playing a central role in strengthening their bond.

=== Sexual orientation ===
Ashley's sexual orientation is a complex topic set by the writers of the series. While sources that define the character's sexual orientation as gay are present, AskMen.com, for one, defines it as bisexual. The character herself when asked, replied: "I'm not into labels." Yet, she is able to unselfconsciously use words like "gay" and "lesbian" to assert her sexuality, as well as accept these as labels for herself.

Musgrave, when giving insight into the character's sexual identity, stated, "I think that Ashley has always [been] known for being unpredictable. One of her famous lines is, 'I'm not into labels.' She doesn't have one, so she's not gay, she's not straight." Musgrave added, "But whoever she sees love in, she falls for that person. She's not going for a physical package; she's going for the inner characteristics. I think that's important, and I wish that more humans could be like that. I think that she's not worried about finding her sexual identity; it's found. And she is the 'no label girl.'"

In giving more back story to the character's sexual history, Aiden Dennison was detailed as Ashley's one male romantic encounter and relationship. After Aiden and another unknown male, she started dating girls exclusively, all viewed by her as sexual adventures. Ashley's need to dominate her lovers was seen to change with Spencer. Spencer became more than just another conquest for her. When the two broke up, this briefly changed. Ashley again sought out Aiden and used him to get over Spencer, her need to conquer once again present.

Though Ashley's heart is often seen to be with Spencer, she exhibits what can be construed as romantic feelings or at least a powerful emotional bond where Aiden is concerned.

== Storyline ==
=== Season 1 ===
Ashley Davies is born on April 21, 1989. She is raised into a wealthy family, mostly by her mother. Her father is Raife Davies (C.C. DeVille), a rock star who sleeps around, does drugs, and is rarely home at all due to his constant touring with his band, Purple Venom. Her mother is a socialite who is almost never home. Her parents have been divorced since Ashley was eight years old. She only sees her father on special occasions such as her birthday. Ashley suffers from being neglected, and as a result tends to crave attention; she spends her entire life searching for love, but the instant she finds it, she pushes it away because she does not know how to handle it and believes she will only cause the other person pain.

In the first episode, it is revealed that at one point in her life Ashley was dating Aiden Dennison. After the two had sex, Ashley discovered that she was pregnant. She was going to keep the baby, saying that she wanted somebody who she could finally love and who would always love her back. She instead suffered a miscarriage and the two broke up. Ashley then turned to girls and slept around with various nameless girls quite often. After the breakup, she and Aiden rarely spoke. It is having Spencer Carlin in her life that results in her friendship with Aiden being restored.

When Spencer arrives at King High in October of junior year, she first meets Ashley after literally running into her and making her spill coffee, books, etc. Ashley, who is rude to her at first, later apologizes at the gym. The two instantly become best friends, as Ashley opens Spencer's world to a vast array of new possibilities.

Ashley (left) and Spencer (right).

Ashley's past with Madison Duarte is also revealed. Ashley and Madison were once friends in freshman year of high school, but once Aiden took an interest in Ashley, Madison became jealous and broke off their friendship. Madison made fun of Ashley because of her sexuality and found great enjoyment in harassing her. This continues throughout the first season.

Ashley visibly develops romantic feelings for Spencer. It is clear that Spencer, who is beginning to discover her true sexuality due to Ashley, returns those feelings, but Ashley keeps pushing her away because she "wants [her], but she doesn't want to hurt [her]". Spencer tells her that she cannot only take care of herself but Ashley as well, and the two share a kiss that leads to both intercourse and the start of their romance.

=== Season 2 ===
Ashley and her father have a dinner, to which Spencer is invited. Ashley's dad dies shortly after in a car crash. Ashley is upset with his death and pushes Spencer away.

At her father's funeral, Ashley discovers that she has a half sister (Kyla) and she realizes that all she ever knew about her dad was a lie. Ashley does not like Kyla because of what she represents (her father's lies) and Ashley becomes angry when Spencer tries to integrate Kyla into their group. She manages to deal with her family problems thanks to Spencer, who helps her along the way.

As Spencer and Ashley's relationship progresses, Spencer tries to keep their love a secret, but Ashley wants it out in the open. She pressures Spencer to "come out" to her parents, but she is too afraid of what her devout Catholic mother, Paula, will think. When Spencer's mother walks in on Spencer and Ashley during an intimate moment, she reacts angrily and throws Ashley out of the house; she tells Spencer that she cannot go to school because she does not want her to see Ashley. She hires a sexual therapist to "straighten her out", but Spencer's father, Arthur vehemently opposes this and puts his support firmly behind his daughter. Paula begins to tolerate Spencer and Ashley's relationship.

During prom, Madison apologizes to Ashley, saying that she finally understands how much grief Ashley and Spencer have gone through in order to be together. Tragedy abounds when the prom is the target of a drive-by shooting where several people die, including Spencer's adopted brother, Clay.

=== Season 3 ===
Following the shooting, Ashley leaves for Europe with her mother because she "just couldn't deal". During her time away, she does not talk to Spencer, who is mourning the loss of her brother. Upon returning, she tries to talk to her, but Spencer is not ready and only pushes her away. Ashley later tricks Spencer into talking; the two kiss passionately for some time, but Spencer decides to break it off and stay broken up. She explains that Ashley was not there for her when Clay died, and because Ashley "didn't know what she wanted". This is their breakup and prompts Ashley to have sex with Aiden, which Spencer finds out about when Ashley shows up at school on the back of Aiden's motorcycle. This further angers Spencer.

After getting her inheritance, Ashley offers Spencer a trip to Cabo, but she declines because they both need to figure out their own paths in life. The night before Ashley leaves, she talks to Spencer and tries once more to keep her in her life. After hanging up the phone, she turns over to face Aiden, and it is clear that she has slept with him yet again.

After getting her inheritance, Ashley decides to drop out of high school and get her GED with Kyla. She and Kyla eventually bond and become very close, moving into a loft together; they both buy the loft with the money they share that they inherited from their father.

In the mid-season finale, entitled "Gay Pride", it is revealed that Spencer and her mother, Paula, had been fighting about going to the Pride Festival. Paula tries to convince Spencer that she cannot go herself because of her schedule at work, but Spencer is sure that she refuses to go due to homophobia. Ashley convinces Paula to go by asking her what she is truly afraid of, and by telling her to go to Pride as [her] mom for the day, since "God knows [she] could use one every now and then". Paula and Ashley go to Pride together and meet Arthur and Spencer there, and Spencer finally realizes why she really fell in love with Ashley in the first place. After the festival, Spencer calls Ashley and says that "now it's [her] turn to open [her] front door" (which she is standing behind; a direct reference to "Can't Buy Me Love", where Ashley tells her to do the same thing before offering her the trip to Cabo). Ashley does, and Spencer is standing there with a trench coat on; she drops it to reveal her naked body, and they kiss, going inside of the loft where the two make love. After this, they are back together as a couple and while Ashley deals with much music-related stuff and her father; her and Spencer have a complication about their future together. Ashley questions if Spencer is going across the country to go to college or staying in LA. On the last episode, the series ends at a graduation party with Ashley giving Spencer a key to the loft no matter what choice Spencer makes and then Spencer tells her that she was not going to go. They then share a kiss and walk back out to the party.

== Impact ==
Ashley Davies made a significant impact on television. Her famous line, "I'm not into labels", became a favorite quote among viewers. AskMen.com states the character as an icon among teenagers and young adults, while AfterEllen.com describes her romance with Spencer Carlin as one that has made television history. "Lesbian teen romances on television rarely last beyond sweeps week, so the fact that the one between Ashley and girlfriend Spencer (co-star Gabrielle Christian) has become such a focal point of the program is remarkable indeed," stated Karman Kregloe, Senior Writer and Director of Special Projects of the website.

A popular love story, fan videos and fan fiction are rampant for the pairing, also known by the portmanteau "Spashley" for (Spencer and Ashley). When asked of all the mania surrounding the couple, the fan videos in particular, Musgrave stated her awareness:

I have a MySpace account and I always switch out the videos they have up there. Also, I type in things in the search engine for music for what I want to put on my page. And one day randomly I heard about this band called South of Nowhere, and I thought 'Oh I'll put them up as joke.' So I typed in 'South of Nowhere' and our show came up, and I thought, 'For music?' and they have some of our songs from the show up there. It was really cool. People are so interested in the show.

In addition, fans have been known to ask Musgrave for advice on how to come out to their friends and family, often thanking her for giving them the courage to be themselves. Musgrave is seen as a spokesperson for gay youth, who look to her for guidance. In response to this, she stated that it is a difficult title to live up to, but that she is up for the task. "I'm trying," she said. "I'm trying to be the best lesbian I can."
