= Gabrielle Christian =

American actress and singer

- Born: Gabrielle Christine Horchler; July 30, 1984 (age 42); Washington, D.C., U.S.
- Occupations: Actress; singer
- Years active: 2000–present
- Notable work: South of Nowhere
- Spouse: Justin Mentzer (m. 2009; div. 2023)
- Website: gabriellechristian.com (archived 2021-06-10)

Gabrielle Christian (born Gabrielle Christine Horchler; July 30, 1984) is an American actress and singer best known for her portrayal of Spencer Carlin in The N original series South of Nowhere, and her portrayal of Colby Robson in the web series Girltrash! and the film Girltrash: All Night Long. In addition, she has also guest starred on Drake & Josh, Windfall, Without a Trace and What Should You Do? along with several minor roles in a variety of other shows.

== Early life and career ==
Christian was born Gabrielle Christine Horchler in Washington, D.C. to parents Gabe and Joani. She grew up in Cheverly, Maryland. She began performing in plays at age 12. She has four sisters (Gen, Steph, Jules, Ili). Christian acquired her first acting job while she still attending high school at Eleanor Roosevelt High School located in Greenbelt, Maryland, on the television series Young Americans. She studied one and half years of theater at the University of Pittsburgh, before relocating to Los Angeles, California after landing roles on several television series What Should You Do?, Without a Trace and Drake & Josh. Her most notable role was portraying Spencer Carlin on The N's hit television series South of Nowhere which aired for three seasons between 2005 and 2008. Outside of South Of Nowhere, Christian appeared in CSI: Miami as Amy Hobbs in the Season six episode "Permanent Vacation." In 2006 she appeared as Miranda Keyton in the "Truth Be Told and Priceless" episodes of Windfall. In 2007 Christian portrayed Colby Robson in Angela Robinson's Girltrash! web-series alongside South of Nowhere co-star Mandy Musgrave. In 2008 she appeared in the "Atomic No. 33" episode of Numbers. In 2010 she appeared as Justine Grogan, the daughter of Abbey Grogan (Jennifer Grey), on the "Unplanned Parenthood" episode of House. In August 2011 she guest starred on The Protector as lab assistant Laurel Nash. Christian has two films yet to be released the first being You're Cordially Uninvited where she portrays Rose, a woman who is engaged to another woman (Lisa), but wishes not to have to face her parents and their reaction. The second film was released in 2014 and is the musical film to the Girltrash! web series titled Girltrash: All Night Long where she will once again portray Colby Robson.

On June 2, 2011 Christian released her first single entitled "Kissing Mandy" to iTunes.

On March 24, 2020, Christian starred in the Canadian TV film Vintage Hearts (alternatively named Love's Second Chance), which premiered on September 21, 2020 on the Hallmark Channel. She portrays Rose Padero, a fashion stylist living in New York who moves back home to inherit her grandmother's small-town shop.

In 2021, Christian joined the cast of A Hui Hou, a film written and directed by filmmaker J.R. Niles. The film is currently in post-production as of August 2022. She also joined Niles for two additional films, Bonds of Redemption and Maria De Luna.

== Personal life ==
Christian helps her mother with the Sudden Infant Death Syndrome (SIDS) organization. The organization was created by her mother after the loss of her son in 1991. She uses the surname Christian in memory of her brother. Her mother has written a book, often known as the SIDS "Bible". The book features a poem Christian wrote when she was eight.

Christian became the spokesperson for the organization FAIR Fund, which works to engage youth in the areas of human trafficking, domestic violence, and sexual assault prevention. She hosts cocktail events to showcase jewelry made by girls participating in the JewelGirls program. Christian's father is from Hungary. She speaks fluent Hungarian, conversational French, and basic Russian.

Christian maintains close friendships with fellow South of Nowhere cast members Maeve Quinlan and Mandy Musgrave. Christian married longtime boyfriend Justin Mentzer on July 11, 2009 at Saint Timothy's Chapel in Mentzer's home town of Drummond, Montana with the reception held at the Mentzers' family ranch. Mentzer filed for divorce in May 2022. The divorce was finalized in March 2023.

== Filmography ==
=== Film ===
Year	Title	Role	Notes
2005	American Gun	Girl	
2006	Joe Lies	High School Girl	Short
2007	South of Pico	Astrid	
2009	John Dunn's Last Run	Stephanie	Short
2011	You're Cordially Uninvited	Rose	Short
2013	Day Dreamers	Girl	Short
2013	A 2nd Opinion	Lilian	Short
2013	Breaking Chains	Jane	Short; also producer
2013	Bawlin'	Chelsie	Short
2014	Girltrash: All Night Long	Colby Robson	
2015	The Party Is Over	Danielle	
2015	Words Left Unsaid	Mandy	Short
2019	More Beautiful for Having Been Broken	Sasha Pinchot	
2020	Vintage Hearts	Rose Padero	TV film
2021	A Hui Hou	Blue	Post-Production
2022	Bonds of Redemption	Lydia	Announced
2022	Maria De Luna	Lucy	Pre-Production

=== Television ===
Year	Title	Role	Notes
2000	Young Americans	Grace Banks	"Cinderbella", "Winning Isn't Everything", "Gone"
2003	What Should You Do?	Tai	TV series
2004	Without a Trace	Monica	"In the Dark"
2005–2007	Drake & Josh	Lucy	"Girl Power", "The Storm"
2005–2008	South of Nowhere	Spencer Carlin	Main role
2006	Windfall	Miranda Keyton	"Truth Be Told", "Priceless"
2007	CSI: Miami	Amy Hobbs	"Permanent Vacation"
2008	Numbers	Audrey Doran	"Atomic No. 33"
2010	House	Justine	"Unplanned Parenthood"
2011	The Protector	Laurel Nash	"Rats"
2011	Nick Swardson's Pretend Time	Drunk Girl	"The Mis-Education of Garry Gaga"
2011	The Middle	Cashier	"Thanksgiving III"
2012	Dirty Work	Veronica	"Armadillo"
2012	Jersey Shore: Shark Attack	Penelope	Television film
2012–2014	The Unwritten Rules	Lauren	TV series
2013	Brandt Point	Ashley Hoffman	TV film
2013	Hawaii Five-0	Tina	"Kekoa"
2013	Run DMZ	Candy	TV series
2013	The Royalty Club		TV series
2015	Instant Mom	Lynda Momsly	"Bag Lady"

=== Web ===
Year	Title	Role	Notes
2007–2009	Girltrash!	Colby Robson	6 episodes
2009	3 Way	Cindy Shimms	Episode: "Ladycops: Brotherly Love"
2013	Ctrl.Alt.Del	Carson Clarke	6 episodes

=== Music videos ===
Year	Title	Artist
2006	"How to Save a Life"	The Fray
2012	"Remember Everything"	Five Finger Death Punch
2014	"She"	Jen Foster

== Discography ==
Year	Title	Notes
2011	Kissing Mandy	Single
