= Girltrash! =

American web series (2007–2009)

- Genre: Comedy
- Created by: Angela Robinson
- Written by: Angela Robinson
- Directed by: Angela Robinson
- Starring: Michelle Lombardo; Lisa Rieffel; Riki Lindhome; Rose Rollins; Gabrielle Christian; Mandy Musgrave
- Country of origin: United States
- Original language: English
- No. of seasons: 1
- No. of episodes: 11

Production
- Executive producers: Angela Robinson; Alexandra Kondracke; Josh Polon
- Producers: Rebecca Sekulich; Nathan Swisher
- Editors: Angela Robinson; Robert Cosentino; Chris W. Hill
- Running time: approx. 3 Minutes approx. 4 minutes (two-part episodes)

Original release
- Release: June 10, 2007 – September 3, 2009

Related
- Girltrash: All Night Long

Girltrash (stylized as Girltrash!) is a web series created by Angela Robinson. It originally aired on ourchart.com from June to August 2007. It stars Michelle Lombardo, Lisa Rieffel, Riki Lindhome, Rose Rollins, Gabrielle Christian and Mandy Musgrave.

== Pilot ==
The series follows the lives of Tyler Murphy, Daisy Robson, and LouAnne Dubois, along with Misty Monroe and Daisy's little sister Colby. It is set in the Los Angeles criminal underworld with Tyler and Daisy chasing after LouAnne, a con artist who is on the run from Monique Jones from whom she stole money. LouAnne seduces Tyler. To make matters worse, Colby and Misty are being held hostage by Monique in order for Tyler and Daisy to finish their end of the deal.

The filmmakers ran out of funding before the project could be completed and the series remains unfinished.

== Cast ==
- Michelle Lombardo as Tyler Murphy
- Lisa Rieffel as Daisy Robson
- Riki Lindhome as LouAnne "Trouble" Dubois
- Rose Rollins as Monique Shaniqua Jones
- Gabrielle Christian as Colby Robson
- Mandy Musgrave as Misty Monroe
- Amber Benson as Svetlana "Lana" Dragovich
- Margaret Cho as Min Suk
- Maeve Quinlan as Judge Cragen
- Joel Michaely as Dryer Guy
- Jimmi Simpson as Valentine

== Episodes ==
No.	Title	Original release date
1	"Episode 1"	June 10, 2007
Tyler and Daisy have an encounter at a bar with Valentine, a gun-toting loan shark who demands they pay money that Tyler stole from him after seducing his wife.
2	"Episode 2"	June 17, 2007
As Tyler and Daisy drive to their next job, they reminisce about their past encounters with LouAnne.
3	"Episode 3"	June 24, 2007
Tyler and Daisy confront LouAnne to get the money back, but the situation changes putting them all in danger.
4	"Episode 4"	July 1, 2007
Tyler, Daisy and LouAnne are now on the run. Tyler reminisces about the first time she met LouAnne and just how much better life was before their encounter.
5	"Episode 5"	July 8, 2007
While Tyler and LouAnne flirt with each other, Judge Cragen offers Daisy $2,000 to get Tyler away from her.
6	"Episode 6"	July 15, 2007
As the girls are on the run we are introduced to the overly violent criminal Monique who takes her anger out on a laundry guy who messed with her washing. Daisy gets an unexpected call from her sister Colby.
7	"Episode 7"	July 22, 2007
Monique has Misty and Colby. She gives Daisy an option to bring her the money and LouAnne, but LouAnne decides to run.
8	"Episode 8"	July 29, 2007
LouAnne has escaped. Daisy is fearful for her sister's life, and Monique threatens to go to work on Misty using a 9-iron.
9	"Episode 9"	August 5, 2007
With LouAnne still on the run, Tyler and Daisy need to get a hold of a lot of cash quick to pay off Monique. Tyler calls Lana, a Russian Mafia princess, to see if she can help but when Lana hangs up, they decide to turn up at her place. Lana once tried to kill Tyler. Meanwhile, Misty and Colby argue about Colby seeing other people
10	"Episode 10"	September 3, 2009
Tyler asks Lana to loan her some money. Meanwhile, Misty and Colby plead with Monique to let them go. On the street, Daisy finds LouAnne, but learns that LouAnne spent all of the money that she stole.
11	"Episode 11: The Lost Colby & Misty Scenes"	September 3, 2009
Un-edited footage; Colby and Misty manage to untie themselves, but are still trapped in the warehouse with Monique. Tyler gets the money from Lana in exchange for agreeing to do Lana a favor in the future... with no questions asked.

== Film ==
Girltrash: All Night Long is the musical prequel to Girltrash, starring Gabrielle Christian, Michelle Lombardo, Mandy Musgrave, Lisa Rieffel, Rose Rollins, Kate French, Malaya Drew and Clementine Ford. Girltrash: All Night Long was directed by Alex Kondracke and produced and written by Angela Robinson and Lisa Thrasher. Stacy Codikow, founder of Power Up was the executive producer.

Before the film's release controversy arose when creator, writer and producer Angela Robinson relinquished her association with the film stating: "Power Up is presenting a version of the film that I have not seen, that is unfinished and that has not been creatively approved by me as a result, I do not support nor validate any screenings or commercial sales of Girltrash: All Night Long at this time." Codikow responded by stating that Robinson had in fact seen the final edit of the film. The film was released on February 1, 2014.

== See also ==
- List of lesbian, gay, bisexual, or transgender-related films by storyline
