= Michelle Lombardo =

American model and actress (born 1983)

- Born: September 16, 1983 (age 43); Glastonbury, Connecticut, U.S.
- Education: Glastonbury High School
- Occupations: Actress; model
- Years active: 2004–present
- Known for: Girlfriends' Guide to Divorce Quarterlife; Californication Girltrash!
- Children: 3
- Modeling information
- Height: 5 ft 10 in (1.78 m)
- Hair color: Brown
- Eye color: Blue
- Agency: Next Model Management

Michelle Helen Lombardo (born September 16, 1983) is an American model and actress. Lombardo gained fame with her appearances in the 2000s Sports Illustrated Swimsuit Issues. She made her film debut in Dishdogz in 2005 and began acting on television in 2007 on Entourage. She had a major role as Tyler Murphy in Girltrash! and appeared in the box-office hit Click (2006). She had small roles in the comedy action film Cat Run (2011) and drama film Redwood Highway (2013), and appeared in television series The Defenders, Mad Men and Girlfriends' Guide to Divorce.

== Early life ==
Lombardo was born on September 16, 1983, in Glastonbury, Connecticut. Lombardo has one brother and one sister. Lombardo was the captain of her volleyball team at Glastonbury High School. In 1999, she was discovered at her high school career day by model scout Tina Kiniry from John Casablancas Modeling & Acting Agency. Early in her career, she worked locally in Connecticut as a model. In 2001 and 2002, she attended University of Connecticut, taking courses in nutrition. She relocated to Los Angeles to pursue her dream of becoming a model and an actress.

== Career ==
In 2004, she won the inaugural Sports Illustrated "Fresh Face" contest and appeared in the magazine's annual Swimsuit Issue in 2004 and 2005. Lombardo and eight other "Fresh Face" contestants appeared together on The Late Late Show with Craig Kilborn, taking part in a skit with Danny DeVito. In February 2004, Lombardo learned that she was the winner of the contest in a segment on Dateline NBC and signed a three-year contract with Next Model Management. She has been the cover of Triathlete and in pictorials for Playboy and Complex. She appeared in commercials for Suzuki Forenza and T-Mobile. Lombardo was ranked at number 53 on AskMen's list of the Top 99 Most Desirable Women of 2008.

She has had guest roles on Entourage, October Road, Mad Men and The Defenders. She had roles films Click (2006), All In (2006), Stiletto (2008), Calvin Marshall (2009), Cat Run (2011) and Girltrash: All Night Long (2014). She portrayed Surfer Girl, one of Hank Moody's love interests, on the first season of Californication. In 2008, she had a recurring role as Debra on web series Quarterlife. She played the main role of Tyler Murphy on the web series Girltrash!. She was also a host on the cable network Current TV.

== Personal life ==
In her spare time, Lombardo enjoys outdoor activities such as mountain biking, reading, snowboarding and swimming. She has three children.

== Filmography ==
Film roles
Year	Title	Role	Notes
2005	Dishdogz	Nurse Hatcher	
2006	All In	Jasmine	
2006	Click	Linda	
2007	Machine	Layla	
2008	Essential Life	Jordan	Short film
2008	Stiletto	Suicide Girl	
2009	Calvin Marshall	Tori Jensen	
2011	Cat Run	Stephanie	
2013	Redwood Highway	Stacia	
2013	RockBarnes: The Emperor in You	Amy	
2013	Discarded	Alice	
2014	Girltrash: All Night Long	Tyler Murphy	
2015	Sky	Bar Singer–Helen	
2015	The Morning After	Maggie	
2016	Black Road	Sarah	
2017	Americons	Mathis	
2018	Welcome to Where You've Always Been	Ashia	Short film
Television roles
Year	Title	Role	Notes
2007	Entourage	Catherine	Episodes: "The First Cut Is the Deepest", "Snow Job"
2007	October Road	Amiquay	Episode: "Let's Get Owen"
2007–2009	Girltrash!	Tyler Murphy	Main role; 11 episodes
2007–2008	Californication	Surfer Girl	3 episodes
2008	Quarterlife	Debra	5 episodes
2010	The Defenders	Darian Sollaway	Episode: "Nevada v. Sen. Harper"
2014	Mad Men	Sprout	Episode: "The Monolith"
2017	The Haunted	Jane Doe	Television film
2018	Girlfriends' Guide to Divorce	Tess Fury	3 episodes
