= Spencer Carlin =

Fictional character from the television series South of Nowhere

- Portrayed by: Gabrielle Christian
- Duration: 2005–08
- First appearance: "Secret Truths"
- Last appearance: "On the Precipice"
In-universe information
- Occupation: Student at UCLA; Film director
- Parents: Paula Carlin; Arthur Carlin
- Brothers: Glen Carlin; Clay Carlin (adoptive, deceased)
- Wife: Ashley Davies
- Children: Clay - Son with Ashley

Spencer Carlin is a fictional character from South of Nowhere, a television series produced by Noggin LLC for its teen block, The N. Spencer attends King High, the central setting for the show. She is portrayed by Gabrielle Christian, and has a tempestuous romantic relationship with Ashley Davies. She was included in AfterEllen.com's Top 50 Favorite Female TV Characters.

== Background ==
Actress Gabrielle Christian was immediately noted by South of Nowhere casting directors as having significant chemistry with costar Mandy Musgrave when both went in to audition for the series. This led to the producers pairing the two as their main lesbian romance of the show. The relationship is often seen as unpredictable, with Spencer and Ashley going through periods where they need to be away from each other. Christian detailed, "I think like most high school relationships, even though Ashley and Spencer usually end up coming back to each other, there are periods where Ashley makes a wrong decision and Spencer makes a wrong decision and we take our little breaks."

Ashley gives Spencer a different outlook on life and teaches her to be more independent. Spencer subsequently learns how to be strong and not so repressed all the time, and how to make decisions for herself instead.

"She definitely becomes a lot more confident and more determined to figure out where she's going with her future and figure out what she's going to do with her life," Christian stated. "And with that goes learning the independence of what she's going to do — with or without a relationship. And it's what every high school senior goes through, which I really like because it's a totally different route for Spencer."

== Storyline ==
=== Season 1 ===
Spencer Carlin and her family move from a small town in Ohio to the big city Los Angeles, where she quickly forms a friendship with bad-to-the-bone Ashley Davies. Her mother doesn't like Ashley so when she befriends Kelly, her mom is happy but the friendship ends when Kelly tries to make a move. Spencer soon realizes that she is gay and confides in Ashley. At first, she is afraid of how the world will treat her. Throughout the season, Spencer's friendship with Ashley soon builds into a romantic relationship. At first, Spencer tries to run from her love for Ashley. She goes on a date with Aiden, but realizes that she wants to be with Ashley. She leaves her date and goes to help a drugged out Ashley. They spend their first night together. The next day, Ashley begins to pull away, but in the last episode of the season, Spencer and Ashley talk about their feelings and eventually make love.

=== Season 2 ===
Dating throughout most of Season 2, the first character to know about their relationship is their friend, Aiden Dennison. Spencer comes out to Chelsea, and is overheard by Spencer's brother, Clay (Chelsea's boyfriend). Both are immediately accepting and supportive. Her other brother, Glen, catches them kissing, and acts in a hostile manner toward them before eventually accepting their relationship. Spencer's mother, Paula, catches the two in bed later on and stops them from seeing each other. Though Arthur, Spencer's dad, is accepting of his daughter's choices and tries keep his family functioning normally. This hits the breaking point when Paula hires an ex-gay therapist to come and convert Spencer. Paula's actions drive Spencer to run away with Ashley. She eventually comes back home after Arthur puts his foot down about her behavior and Paula starts to accept their relationship.

Spencer and Ashley become free to date each other openly. However, a problem arises when Aiden discovers he is still in love with Ashley, creating a love triangle between the three. Spencer finds out at prom, and it soon becomes obvious to everyone as they begin to leave. Spencer and Aiden argue, and Ashley tells them, "I decide who I love." Spencer tells her to "just decide". But before Ashley can choose, a drive-by shooting occurs and her decision is left unknown at the end of Season 2.

=== Season 3 ===
After an extended period of kissing her, Spencer realizes she cannot forgive Ashley for leaving her for the summer. She says that Ashley was not there for her when her brother (Clay) died as a result of the drive-by shooting. Although she ends the relationship, Spencer still talks to Ashley, but wants to find a different life for herself.

After Ashley and Spencer's breakup, Spencer meets with Madison Duarte for lunch. Madison informs her that there are many single lesbians in LA. Spencer decides to adopt this new mindset immediately.

Later that day, Spencer bumps into a new girl, who says she is hot. Later, they run into each other at Chelsea's art studio, and the girl introduces herself as Carmen. They spend the whole day together, during which they talk about themselves, their lives, and during which Carmen states that she is a lesbian. That night, Spencer and Carmen kiss passionately.

In the next episode, Spencer introduces Carmen to her parents. They spend the whole day playing games, but Carmen gets uncomfortable after they see a tattoo on her hand. Spencer tries to console her by saying her parents just want to know her, but Carmen shrugs her off, saying "You don't even know me."

But for Spencer, it's kind of interesting because this is the first person she's really been with, relationship-wise, besides Ashley. And you see the way her family deals with the Carmen character, and the acceptance they have of her as opposed to Ashley. It's kind of contradictory, actually. There are some choices that the writers have made that show the family in a different light, and the way Spencer handles being with women now — because before it was mainly just Ashley. But now she's a gay woman and she's experiencing other women, so you kind of get to see that part of her.

— Gabrielle Christian

The next day, Ashley invites Spencer to her new hotspot, Ego, to party. Spencer agrees, but takes Carmen along. Angry, Ashley insults Carmen, calling her Spencer's community service project (she is not aware that they were dating). Spencer, angry, leaves with Carmen. They go to Chelsea's studio, where Spencer tells Carmen that she and Ashley had dated. Carmen gets angry, calling Ashley a "stuck-up, phony, white trash bitch" and saying that Spencer still loves her. Spencer tries to calm her down, but Carmen pushes her into a wall. Spencer tells her to leave, hurt and crying.

Spencer ends it with Carmen, and Carmen moves to San Diego.

Spencer makes plans to go to the LGBT festival, and wants her mom to go with her. But due to her mom's work schedule, they start fighting again about Paula's homophobia. Spencer instead goes to the festival with her dad. Later, Ashley stops by and convinces Paula to go. Spencer is thrilled, and thanks her mom for being part of "one of the greatest days of my life". Paula replies, "It was one of mine too." That night, Spencer calls Ashley and thanks her for bringing Paula. She tells Ashley to open her door, and when Ashley does, Spencer is standing right there. After revealing her naked body, they kiss, make love, and when they wake up the next day Ashley asks if Spencer is going to dump her again. She says no and rushes off to school because she is 5 hours late.

Spencer decides to come out to her grandmother on her 18th birthday. When her grandmother visits and is told by Spencer that she is gay, she is not happy, and decides to go home early. Showing signs of acceptance of her daughter's sexuality Paula stands up for Spencer and accuses her mother of being a bigot.

In the final episode, Spencer has to make a choice to go to a college away from Ashley or go to a college near. In the end, she goes to UCLA and moves in a loft with Ashley.

In the 'Five Years Later' Webpisode, five years after the last episode, Spencer & Ashley are married, and Ashley is heavily pregnant as Spencer donated her eggs while Aiden donated his sperm. Ashley finally decides to name their child Clay after Spencer's deceased brother which makes her happy.
