= Rose Rollins =

American actress

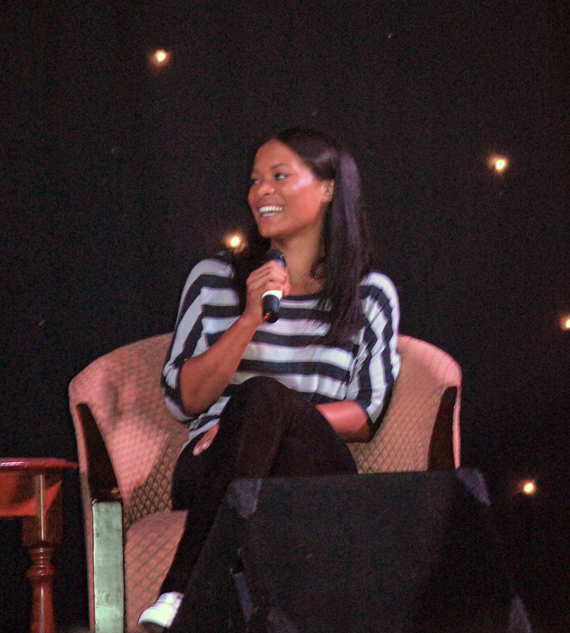
- Rollins at fan convention for The L Word in 2009.
- Born: Berkeley, California, U.S
- Occupation: Actress
- Years active: 1999–present

Rose Rollins is an American actress. She is known for her role as Tasha Williams in the Showtime drama series, The L Word (2007–09) and as Valerie Anderson in the ABC crime drama series, The Catch (2016–17).

== Early life ==
Rollins was born in Berkeley, California. She moved to New York when she worked as model, appearing on numerous commercials and major advertising campaigns. She later moved to Los Angeles, and made her acting debut appearing as C. J. Cregg's assistant in two episodes of NBC drama series, The West Wing in 1999.

== Career ==
In early 2000s, Rollins has had supporting roles in films 13 Moons (2002) opposite Jennifer Beals, Undisputed (2002) starring Wesley Snipes, and Something New (2006) starring Sanaa Lathan. She also appeared in Mission: Impossible III in 2006. On television, she had the recurring role in the short-lived ABC legal drama In Justice in 2006.

In 2007, Rollins joined the cast of the Showtime drama series The L Word during the fourth season as Tasha Williams. She starred on the show through the finale in 2009. She also played Monique on the web series Girltrash! in 2007, which was directed by Angela Robinson. She later has appeared on CSI: NY and Miami Medical, before a regular role opposite Kelli Giddish in the short-lived NBC police drama series, Chase produced by Jerry Bruckheimer during 2010–11 season. In 2014, Rollins played the leading role alongside Julia Stiles in the TNT legal drama pilot Guilt by Association.

In 2015, Rollins had a recurring role as Detective Kizmin Rider in the Amazon crime drama series, Bosch. Later that year, she was cast as Valerie Anderson in the ABC drama series The Catch produced by Shonda Rhimes. The series was canceled after two seasons. She later went to co-star on the second season of the Audience Network thriller Condor.

== Filmography ==
=== Film ===
Year	Title	Role	Notes
2002	13 Moons	Sanandra	
2002	Undisputed	Tawnee Rawlins	
2006	Something New	Lauren	
2006	Mission: Impossible III	Ellie	
2006	I Thought of You	Betty Davis	Short film
2007	Blind Man	Summer	
2013	In 3 Days	Ella	Short film
2014	Girltrash: All Night Long	Monique Shaniqua Jones	
2015	Pixels	White House Press Secretary	

=== Television ===
Year	Title	Role	Notes
1999	The West Wing	Suzanne	Episodes: "Post Hoc, Ergo Propter Hoc" and "A Proportional Response"
2004	Nikki and Nora		Pilot
2005	Dr. Vegas	Amanda	Episode: "Babe in the Woods"
2006	In Justice	Victoria	Recurring role, 4 episodes
2007–2009	The L Word	Tasha Williams	Series regular, 28 episodes
2009	CSI: NY	Beth Garrett	Episode: "Dead Reckoning"
2010	Miami Medical	Meg Baxter	Episode: "Down to the Bone"
2010–2011	Chase	Daisy Ogbaa	Series regular, 16 episodes
2012	Southland	Officer Anawalt	Episode: "Underwater"
2012	NCIS	Navy Lt. Comm. Megan Huffner	Episode: "You Better Watch Out"
2013	Nikita	Ellen Crawford	Episode: "Set-Up"
2014	Guilt by Association	Toni LaCollette	Pilot
2015	Bosch	Detective Kizmin Rider	Recurring role, 8 episodes
2016–2017	The Catch	Valerie Anderson	Series regular, 20 episodes
2018	No Apologies	Sara Ruiz	Pilot
2020	Condor	Eva Piper	Series regular
2021	Envy: A Seven Deadly Sins Story	Gabrielle Flores	
2022	Long Slow Exhale	J.C. Abernathy	Starring role
2023	The L Word: Generation Q	Tasha Williams	Guest, 2 episodes

=== Web ===
Year	Title	Role	Notes
2007–2009	Girltrash!	Monique Shaniqua Jones	6 episodes
