= Max Van Ville =

German-American actor (born 1987)

- Born: January 13, 1987 (age 39); Hollywood, Los Angeles, California, U.S.
- Other name: VANVILLE
- Occupations: Actor, producer, DJ
- Years active: 2003-2010

Max Van Ville (born January 13, 1987), also known as VANVILLE, is an American DJ and actor from Hollywood, Los Angeles.

== Filmography ==
Year	Film	Role	Notes
2003	The Battle of Shaker Heights	Infantryman #1	
2003	Bad Santa	Skateboard Bully	
2003	Malcolm in the Middle	Hans	TV series, episode: "Christmas Trees"
2004	Saint Henry	Twiggy	
2004	Summerland	Punk	TV series, episode: "Big Waves"
2004	Sleepover	Skater Dude	
2004	CSI: Crime Scene Investigation	Jonathan Lee Avery Heywood III	TV series, episode: "What's Eating Gilbert Grissom?"
2005	The Chumscrubber	Student #3	
2005	Numb3rs	Josh Kramer	TV series, episode: "Vector"
2005	Buffalo Dreams	Moon	TV film
2006	Cold Case	Boris Litvak	TV series, episode: "Detention"
2006	Big Momma's House 2	Chad	
2006	The Standard	Eric	
2006	Beyond the Break	Emo	TV series, episodes: "The Big Hit", "Vin, Lose, or Draw"
2007	Halloween	Paul Freedman	
2007	Mr. Woodcock	Pizza Waiter #2	
2008	Gardens of the Night	Surf	
2008	Drillbit Taylor	Kid With A Drink	
2009	Costa Rican Summer	Tasty	
2009	Love Hurts	Trev	
2010	High School	Little Dave	
2010	Percy Jackson & the Olympians: The Lightning Thief	Seventies Kid – Casino	
