= Girltrash: All Night Long =

- Film poster
- Directed by: Alexandra Kondracke
- Written by: Angela Robinson
- Produced by: Angela Robinson; Lisa Thrasher
- Starring: Lisa Rieffel; Michelle Lombardo; Gabrielle Christian; Mandy Musgrave; Clementine Ford; Rose Rollins
- Cinematography: Sandra Valde-Hansen
- Edited by: Chris W. Hill
- Music by: Luke Tierney
- Distributed by: POWER UP
- Release date: February 1, 2014
- Running time: 86 minutes
- Country: United States
- Language: English

Girltrash: All Night Long is a 2014 musical comedy film directed by Alexandra Kondracke and written by Angela Robinson. The film is a prequel to the web series Girltrash! and stars Lisa Rieffel, Michelle Lombardo, Gabrielle Christian and Mandy Musgrave.

== Plot Synopsis ==
Set during one long night in the LGBT subculture of Los Angeles, Daisy and Tyler are two rock and roll musicians who are selected to partake in a battle of the bands contest to claim a prize. But while on their way to the concert, their van breaks down and they are sidetracked by Daisy's younger sister, Colby, a recent college graduate who agrees to drive them to the concert if they help her hook up with her crush; a struggling actress named Misty. Also tagging along is Misty's bisexual best friend Sid, who longs to hook up with a famous celebrity. However, Misty is not interested in hooking up with Colby because she has her sights on Tyler. Meanwhile, Daisy tries to win back her ex-girlfriend, Xan, who is on a date with her latest girlfriend who is competing against Daisy and Tyler's band that very night. Elsewhere, Monique Jones is a violent ex-con recently paroled from prison who comes looking for Daisy and Tyler with a score to settle.

== Cast ==
- Lisa Rieffel as Daisy Robson
- Michelle Lombardo as Tyler Murphy
- Gabrielle Christian as Colby Robson
- Mandy Musgrave as Misty Monroe
- Kate French as Sid
- Clementine Ford as Zan
- Rose Rollins as Monique Shaniqua Jones
- Heather Thomas as Nadine Robson
- Megan Cavanagh as Officer Margie

== Awards ==
Year	Award	Category	Result
2014	FilmOut San Diego	Best Soundtrack	Won
2015	Paris Lesbian and Feminist Film Festival	Best Feature Film	Won

== See also ==
- List of LGBT-related films directed by women
