= Machine (2006 film) =

- Directed by: Michael Lazar
- Written by: Michael Lazar
- Produced by: Robert Berson; Michael Lazar; Nick Vallelonga
- Starring: Michael Lazar; Michael Madsen; Neal McDonough; James Russo; Michelle Lombardo; Terasa Livingstone
- Cinematography: Jeff Baustert; Byron Werner
- Edited by: Kevin McGuinness; Tony Wise
- Music by: Ron Dziubla
- Production companies: Vallelonga/Quattrochi Productions; Highwire Films; Blue Cow Creative
- Distributed by: Artist View Entertainment (2006); MTI Home Video (2006); Los Banditos Films (2009)
- Release date: October 29, 2006
- Country: United States
- Language: English

Machine is a 2006 American action movie written and directed by Michael Lazar, and starring Lazar, James Russo and Neal McDonough.

The film had theatrical debut October 29, 2006.

== Plot ==
Ex-special forces mercenary and now hardened criminal Vic, (Michael Lazar) lives in a world of cons, double crosses, crooked cops, mob bosses, and drug-dealing crime lords. Playing by his own rules, Vic and his partner Frank (Paul Sloan) work both sides of the street, caring only about where they can score and take down the most cash. After a dangerous shootout during a drug deal gone bad, Vic finds himself working for ruthless crime boss Paul Santo (Nick Vallelonga). Santo is being indicted for murder, and he enlists Vic and Frank to kill the three witnesses who will testify against him. Watching Vic's every move is Santo's strongest soldier, Ray, (Michael Madsen) a stone-cold killer, who would like nothing better than to whack Vic and Frank the moment his boss gives him the okay. As the Asian proverb says, "In the shadow of every crime is a woman" and that holds true for Vic as his grifter girlfriend Thea (Lisa Arturo) and Frank's ex, the exotic, sultry, Layla (Michelle Lombardo) have their own agendas as they both try in their own way to use and manipulate their men. As Vic tries to juggle all this as well as kill the witnesses to pay off his debt to Santo, and at the same time avoid Ray's wrath, he is pursued by crooked vice cop Ford (Neal McDonough) who's relentless as he turns up the heat on Vic and Frank. On top of all this, it doesn't help that Asian crime lord, Cho (Garret Sato) and his henchman Butch (James Russo) are applying their own brand of pressure on Vic and Frank. They want to take out Santo and Ray, using Vic and Frank as pawns in their game of revenge and murder. In the end, Vic settles all scores as these competing factions come crashing together in the violent, action-packed climax.

== Cast ==
- Michael Lazar as Vic
- Michael Madsen as Ray
- Neal McDonough as Detective Ford
- James Russo as Butch
- Michelle Lombardo as Layla
- Terasa Livingstone as Vivian
- Paul Sloan as Frank
- Lisa Arturo as Thea
- Nick Vallelonga as Paul Santo
- Brian Hayes Currie as "Top"
- Garret Sato as Cho
- Robert Berson as Rich
- Jess King as Banes
- Robert Ciancimino as Kane
- Jimmy Labrie as Davis
- Hadi Armani as Raheed

== Reception ==
Film Monthly said in its review, "This one is worth a DVD rental just for their performances, but most especially if you’re a fan."

eFilmCritic said, "The movie's a cluttered mess with a plotline so long-winded that one runs out of breath just trying to make it all connect."

Film Critics United wrote, "Other than giving me a new found respect for Neal McDonough who gave his best shot in role that probably barely covers three notes on his C-class Benz, one would be wise to steer way clear of ‘Machine’."

Home Theater Info said, "Considering this was the first time for so many involved in the production too much can’t be expected. There is some potential here that subsequent films may explore."
