= Buffalo Dreams =

2005 TV film

- Film poster
- Written by: Marjorie Schwartz Nielsen
- Directed by: David Jackson
- Starring: Reiley McClendon; Simon R. Baker; George Newbern; Jane Sibbett; Graham Greene
- Theme music composer: Ramin Djawadi
- Country of origin: United States
- Original language: English

Production
- Producers: Linda Berman; John Cosgrove; Terry Dunn Meurer
- Cinematography: Denis Maloney
- Editor: Louis Cioffi
- Running time: 89 minutes
- Production company: Cosgrove Meurer Productions

Original release
- Network: Disney Channel
- Release: March 11, 2005

Buffalo Dreams is a 2005 American Western television film directed by David Jackson on Disney Channel Original Movie.

== Plot ==
Set against the backdrop of New Mexico, the film follows a boy, Josh Townsend, who moves because of his father's job and becomes involved with a group of teens attempting to preserve the buffalo and Navajo traditions. Along the way he makes friends and learns important lessons about life. The movie teaches about a few Navajo traditions. Josh eventually enters a race against his rival and proves to be the better of the two; however, he quits the race after seeing the buffalo herd stampeding. Josh quickly gathers his friends to save the town, and while his rival refuses to help, his friends do. Together, they herd the buffalo away from the town and back onto their preserve. During the process, Josh's friend Thomas Blackhorse falls in front of a buffalo, but is saved by his sister who finally speaks for the first time in years to help calm the buffalo. Josh and his friends are hailed as heroes by the town and in recognition of his bravery, Josh is made an honorary member of the Navajo tribe with the name Rides With the Wind. He and Thomas, who he had trouble getting along with before, make a pact to keep the buffalo safe together.

== Cast ==
- Reiley McClendon as Josh Townsend
- Simon R. Baker as Thomas Blackhorse
- Graham Greene as John Blackhorse
- George Newbern as Dr. Nick Townsend
- Jane Sibbett as Blaine Townsend
- Tessa Vonn as Scout Blackhorse
- Geraldine Keams as Abuela Rose
- Chris Hunter as Kyle
- Adrienne Bailon as Domino
- Max Van Ville as Moon
- Christopher Robin Miller as Virgil
- Seth Packard as Wylie
- Justin Stern as Luke
- Chris White as J.G.

== Production ==
The film was shot in 2004 on location in Utah, with several scenes on Antelope Island (in the Great Salt Lake) at the historic ranch house.

== Awards ==
In 2006 the film was nominated for the Directors Guild of America Award for Outstanding Directing – Children's Programs for David S. Jackson and for Best Performance in a TV Movie, Miniseries or Special - Supporting Young Actress for Tessa Vonn at the 27th Young Artist Awards.
