= D.E.B.S. (2003 film) =

2003 short film by Angela Robinson

- Film poster
- Directed by: Angela Robinson
- Written by: Angela Robinson
- Produced by: Andrea Sperling; Jasmine Kosovic
- Starring: Alexandra Breckenridge; Tammy Lynn Michaels; Shanti Lowry; Jill Ritchie; Clare Kramer
- Narrated by: Phil Terrence
- Cinematography: Kristian Bernier
- Edited by: Angela Robinson
- Music by: Steven M. Stern
- Production company: POWER UP
- Distributed by: POWER UP
- Release date: January 16, 2003 (Sundance Film Festival)
- Running time: 11 minutes
- Country: United States
- Language: English
- Budget: $20,000

D.E.B.S. is a 2003 American action comedy short film written and directed by Angela Robinson. D.E.B.S. made the film festival circuit including the Sundance Film Festival, L.A. Outfest and New York Lesbian and Gay Film Festival, receiving a total of seven film festival awards.

D.E.B.S. is both a parody and an emulation of the Charlie's Angels (2000) format. It features a lesbian love story between one of the heroes and the villain. "Debs" is also short for debutantes.

== Plot ==
A narrator explains that there is a test hidden in the SATs which measures an applicant's ability to fight, cheat, lie and kill. Female students who score well on this hidden test are selected to become members of the secret paramilitary group D.E.B.S. which stands for Discipline, Energy, Beauty and Strength.

Focusing on one squad of D.E.B.S. composed of the team captain Amy, the tough Max, French exchange student Dominique, and the prissy and insecure Janet, all of whom face off against a ruthless villain named Lucinda Reynolds, also known as Lucy in the Sky.

Spoofing television prime time shows, a recap shows the team's boss Mr. Tibbs explaining that Lucy in the Sky was spotted entering the United States again. Max is frustrated knowing that for some reason Lucy keeps capturing Amy and the team has to rescue her. Amy is captured, leading to Max to take over the team to lead them to Lucy's hideout in a dockside warehouse. Max, Janet, and the chain-smoking Dominique make entry into Lucy's hideout and soon are facing off in a gun battle with Lucy's henchmen, led by her right-hand man Billy Skids.

Meanwhile, unknown to either Lucy's henchmen or the D.E.B.S., Lucy and Amy are lovers and Lucy keeps capturing Amy so that the two of them can have sex, with Amy timing them to know when her colleagues will appear to "rescue" her. This time Lucy becomes frustrated over the same routine they have to go through over their secret romance each time. Amy then tells Lucy that she really loves her, and Lucy is happy.

Elsewhere, Max, Janet, and Dominique defeat Lucy's henchmen (with Dominique never dropping the cigarette she's smoking, and Max having an all-too-brief meeting of minds with Skids during their fistfight, while Janet is just determined not to get her favorite sweater ruined). The three D.E.B.S. arrive at a locked door to Lucy's quarters where they hear Amy screaming out, leading them to try to break down the door. But Amy is not screaming in pain, but in passion as she climaxes from the sex. Lucy and Amy quickly dress where Amy tells Lucy that she can capture her again next week during the D.E.B.S. mission to Uganda. On cue from Amy, Lucy punches her out and makes her escape as Max, Janet, and Dominique arrive, none of them aware to Amy's secret tryst with the enemy. Amy thanks them for rescuing her—again. The four D.E.B.S. walk out of the warehouse and into the sunset as Janet asks Amy if that is her sweater that she's wearing and if she got blood or any dirt on it.

== Cast ==
- Alexandra Breckenridge as Amy
- Tammy Lynn Michaels as Max
- Shanti Lowry as Dominique
- Jill Ritchie as Janet
- Clare Kramer as Lucy Diamond
- Daryl Theirse as Mr. Tibbs
- James Buckhammer II as Billy Skids

== Production ==
D.E.B.S. was sponsored by a grant from POWER UP, which promotes gay women in entertainment. Several people involved its creation (director Angela Robinson, Tammy Lynn Michaels) are lesbian.

== Expansion to feature length ==
The success of the short led Robinson to expand the film into a feature length production, D.E.B.S. (2004 film).

== Awards ==
Year	Festival	Award	Category/Recipient(s)
2003	Bearfest - Big Bear Lake International Film Festival	Jury Award	Best Short Film; Angela Robinson
2003	Cleveland International Film Festival	Honorable Mention	Best Women's Short Film; Angela Robinson
2003	Dublin Gay & Lesbian Film Festival	Audience Award	Best Short Film; Angela Robinson
2003	L.A. Outfest	Audience Award	Outstanding Narrative Short Film; Angela Robinson
2003	New York Lesbian and Gay Film Festival	Best Short	Angela Robinson
2003	Philadelphia International Gay & Lesbian Film Festival	Jury Prize	Best Short Film - Lesbian; Angela Robinson
2003	PlanetOut Short Movie Awards	Grand Prize	Angela Robinson
