= The Catch (American TV series) =

American comedy-drama television series

- Genre: Comedy drama; Crime drama; Romance drama
- Created by: Kate Atkinson; Helen Gregory; Jennifer Schuur
- Developed by: Allan Heinberg
- Starring: Mireille Enos; Peter Krause; Alimi Ballard; Jay Hayden; Jacky Ido; Rose Rollins; Sonya Walger; Elvy Yost; John Simm
- Composer: Chad Fischer
- Country of origin: United States
- Original language: English
- No. of seasons: 2
- No. of episodes: 20

Production
- Executive producers: Shonda Rhimes; Betsy Beers; Allan Heinberg; Julie Anne Robinson
- Running time: 42–43 minutes
- Production companies: Shondaland; ABC Studios

Original release
- Network: ABC
- Release: March 24, 2016 – May 11, 2017

The Catch is an American comedy-drama television series that aired on ABC from March 24, 2016, to May 11, 2017. It stars Mireille Enos and Peter Krause, was created by Jennifer Schuur, Kate Atkinson, and Helen Gregory, and developed by Allan Heinberg, and was executive produced by Shondaland's Shonda Rhimes and Betsy Beers. Julie Anne Robinson also served as an executive producer and directed the pilot episode. In May 2016, the series was renewed for a second season, which premiered on March 9, 2017. In May 2017, the series was canceled after two seasons.

== Premise ==
The Catch follows Alice Vaughan (Enos), who runs a private investigation firm in Los Angeles, California. After being defrauded by her fiancé, she is determined to find him—between working on other cases—before it ruins her career. Her fiancé, Benjamin Jones (Krause), is revealed to be a master con artist working for a high-stakes international crime operation along with Margot Bishop (Sonya Walger). Rose Rollins, Elvy Yost, Jay Hayden, Jacky Ido, and Alimi Ballard also co-star.

== Production ==
=== Development ===
On October 21, 2014, it was announced that ABC had bought the original concept for a drama series about a gutsy female forensic accountant, based on a treatment written by novelist Kate Atkinson. The script was written by Jennifer Schuur. The Catch is produced by Shonda Rhimes, Betsy Beers, Julie Anne Robinson, and Schuur. ABC ordered the pilot on January 26, 2015 for the 2015–16 television season. The pilot episode was filmed in Austin, Texas and was directed by Julie Anne Robinson. On May 7, 2015, ABC picked up the pilot to series.

In June 2015, it was announced The Catch would take over How to Get Away with Murder's Thursday 10 ET/9 CT slot and form part of Shondaland's mid-season #TGIT block. On August 18, 2015, it was announced that the series creator Jennifer Schuur had exited the series as showrunner because of creative differences. Shondaland's Allan Heinberg, who has worked on Grey's Anatomy and Scandal, then stepped in as showrunner of The Catch. The Catch premiered on March 24, 2016. On May 12, 2016, ABC renewed the series for a second season, which premiered on March 9, 2017. On May 11, 2017, ABC canceled the series after two seasons.

=== Casting ===
Casting advertisement began in February 2015. On March 2, 2015, it was announced that Mireille Enos would play the leading role of Alice Vaughan. Newcomer Damon Dayoub was cast for the male leading role as Alice's fiancé, Benjamin Jones. Bethany Joy Lenz later was cast as his criminal wife, Zoe. Alan Ruck and Rose Rollins were cast as an estranged couple and friends of Alice and Alice's fiancé Benjamin's. Jacky Ido was cast as an FBI agent who becomes suspicious of Alice, along with Jay Hayden and Elvy Yost as Alice's co-workers in her forensic firm. On May 18, 2015, Lenz revealed on her WhoSay account that she was being replaced. The same day, it was announced that Damon Dayoub, the male lead, was also being replaced.

On July 14, 2015, it was reported that Peter Krause had taken over the male lead role of Benjamin Jones replacing Dayoub, who played the role in the pilot. On July 22, 2015, Sonya Walger was added to the cast as Margot Bishop, replacing Lenz. The pilot was reshot with the new cast members.

For the second season it was announced that John Simm would be upped to the series regular cast, while Ballard and Ido would be departing the series. However, Ido returned as Jules Dao for the season 2 premiere to wrap up his character's storyline.

== Cast and characters ==
=== Main cast ===
- Mireille Enos as Alice Vaughan
- Peter Krause as Benjamin Jones
- Sonya Walger as Margot Bishop
- Jacky Ido as FBI Special Agent Jules Dao (season 1; guest, season 2)
- Rose Rollins as Valerie Anderson
- Alimi Ballard as Reginald Lennox III (season 1)
- Jay Hayden as Danny Yoon
- Elvy Yost as Sophie Novak
- John Simm as Rhys Griffiths (season 2; recurring, season 1)

=== Recurring cast ===
- Medalion Rahimi as Zara Al-Salim (season 1)
- Alan Ruck as Gordan Bailey (season 1)
- Shivani Ghai as Felicity
- Nia Vardalos as Leah Wells (season 1)
- Caleb Smith as Agent Shawn Sullivan (season 1)
- Lesley Nicol as Sybil Griffiths
- T. R. Knight as Tommy Vaughan (season 2)
- Gina Torres as Agent Justine Diaz (season 2)
- Ismael Cruz Córdova as The Hammer (season 2)
- Warren Christie as Ethan Ward (season 2)
- Philippa Coulthard as Tessa Riley (season 2)
- Kevin Carroll as Nicholas Turner (season 2)

The Vaughan character was significantly revised after the pilot episode: instead of a Chicago-based auditor, she became a Los Angeles-based private investigator. She also became sexier: instead of being a "very guarded, lacquered ’50s-era Hitchcock presence," Vaughan became "peppier, a life-lover with mascaraed lashes and a closet filled with Bond girl minidresses." Her style is a "modernised look of the 1960s".

== Broadcast ==
Internationally, the series premiered in Australia on the Seven Network on October 10, 2016. In the UK the show premiered on Sky Living. Since 2022, the show became available on Disney+ outside the US.

== Episodes ==
Season	Episodes	Originally released	
Season	Episodes	First released	Last released
1	10	March 24, 2016	May 19, 2016
2	10	March 9, 2017	May 11, 2017

=== Season 1 (2016) ===
No. overall	No. in season	Title	Directed by	Written by	Original release date	US viewers (millions)
1	1	"Pilot"	Julie Anne Robinson	Story by : Kate Atkinson & Helen Gregory; Teleplay by : Jennifer Schuur	March 24, 2016	5.85
A private investigator named Alice Vaughan and her firm, Anderson-Vaughan Investigations, are plagued by a mysterious Mr. X, who steals money from their clients and always seems to be one step ahead. Alice's upcoming wedding contrasts with her partner Valerie Anderson's pending divorce. However, when Alice's fiancé, "Christopher Hall", disappears into thin air with all of her money and her client data, her bliss disappears when she realizes he conned his way into her life and heart to get her clients' money. Alice, Valerie, and their other team members (P.I. Danny, and hacker-turned-P.I. Sophie) manage to get the money back by anticipating Christopher's next move, but Alice won't back down until she finds out his true identity. Christopher leaves her a stolen painting they both loved, which she takes as an invitation to play his game. Also on Christopher's trail is FBI agent Jules Dao, who hopes to work together with a reluctant Alice to finally catch the con artist.
2	2	"The Real Killer"	Kevin Dowling	Sherry White	March 31, 2016	5.07
After his acquittal, Jeffrey Bloom hires AVI to find out who really killed his older, rich wife Edith. Her son appears to be hiding something, but his hate for Jeffrey and media attention make him reluctant to cooperate. Valerie's disappointed when Gordon doesn't show for mediation. Alice asks Sophie to help her with the painting, and they find out Alice has the real painting. Through the forger of the museum piece, Sophie and Alice discover that "Christopher" uses obituaries to create new identities and set a plan in motion to catch him. Meanwhile, Ben, Margot, and Reggie set their eyes on Kuroqi Princess Zara Al-Salim, who's visiting Los Angeles.
3	3	"The Trial"	John Terlesky	Oanh Ly	April 7, 2016	4.89
AVI helps Valerie's soon-to-be ex-husband when his sister experiences side effects following participation in a clinical trial for MS. She wants to sue the company, but they'll need to find proof that they lied about the success of their first trial. Margot, Ben, and Reggie set out to con Qasim Halabi, head of Princess Zara Al-Salim's security detail and her advisor, by pretending to be looking for investors for the Runyon Towers. Ben continues to bond with the Princess herself and gets in her inner circle. Alice and Sophie are on top of "Christopher" as he used their obit for his new identity. Through Dao, Alice finds out that Christopher may have committed a murder, leading to her accepting his help, and she discovers just how dangerous Margot can be when she's threatened.
4	4	"The Princess and the I.P."	Regina King	Ameni Rozsa	April 14, 2016	4.76
AVI is hired by Marie Sherwood and Phillip Thompson when Gwen Ericsson, Marie's best friend and the developer of a software called ThruSight, disappears. The software is a dangerous weapon in the wrong hands. The team discovers that Gwen faked her own death because Phillip's company wants to sell her software to terrorists. Meanwhile, Ben plays Zara and convinces her to stand up for herself by raising money for a foundation for women's rights. Zara is forced to return to Kuroq with her brother, but not before leaving Ben with a $15 million check. Dao and Alice decide to work together to catch Christopher, but when Alice discovers he truly loved her and apologizes for what he did to her and her firm, she lets him escape. Margot does her best to buy more time when the benefactor's collector pays her a visit. Danny grows jealous of Shawn, head of the firm's security.
5	5	"The Larágan Gambit"	Mike Listo	Danny Tolli	April 21, 2016	4.60
Alice and Ben arrange a secret meeting, but Ben notices that Dao's tailing Alice. He warns her, after which she discovers the bug in her house. Alice comes clean to her colleagues about hunting down Christopher and Valerie helps her to make Dao back down. Meanwhile, the benefactor has decided to forego this month's payment if Margot and Ben steal a bracelet from the Prime Minister of Larágo. They enlist Felicity's help to enact their plan, but they soon discover they're not the only ones after the bracelet. AVI helps William Etheridge, who suspects that his wife Renée, a local politician and client of AVI, is having an affair.
6	6	"The Benefactor"	Jann Turner	Lyndsey Beauliu	April 28, 2016	4.58
Ben and Margot's benefactor comes to town. His name is Rhys Griffiths and he's Margot's brother. He wants the bracelet, but Alice has stolen it from him after their night together. Before Ben can retrieve it, Mickey Shive manages to steal it from Alice. While Ben and Rhys enact a plan to get it back, Margot grows closer to Felicity and discovers why Rhys wants the bracelet so bad, changing the entire deal. Meanwhile, Alice gets caught between Ben and Dao when the latter plans on using the bracelet to catch "Christopher". Also, AVI helps one of the first female Army Rangers when she's being harassed and receives death threats.
7	7	"The Ringer"	John Stuart Scott	Jim Campolongo	May 5, 2016	4.36
Alice decides she and Ben are done after another night together because she refuses to keep lying to the people she loves. AVI helps Vincent Singh when his son Joey goes missing. During the investigation, the team learns Vincent barely sees his son and that his supposedly mentally ill ex-wife Karen may know more about Joey's disappearance than she cares to admit. Rhys enlists Ben and subsequently Margot and Reggie's help to set up a poker con, but he has his own agenda that may ruin Margot's plan. Unable to let go of Ben, Alice manages to convince Dao to go after the people "Christopher" works with in an attempt to free Ben once and for all. However, Rhys has his eyes on Alice and wants to get her out of the way so Ben will stay on their side.
8	8	"The Package"	Bill D'Elia	Jon Dorsey & Greg Goetz	May 12, 2016	4.23
Margot poses as Alice's new therapist and learns valuable intel. Alice makes it her goal to take down the Kensington Firm and she tries to get Ben to pick a side. In order to protect her, Ben tries to get Margot and Rhys to leave Los Angeles, but to no avail. Dao, Valerie, and Alice start their mission by tracking Rhys. Rhys himself enlists Ben and Reggie's help to get a counterfeiter out of witness protection so she can come work for the Firm, but the counterfeiter has some demands of her own. Margot makes a move to thwart Rhys's plans while Rhys threatens to hurt Alice to ensure Ben's loyalty to him. Meanwhile, the team at AVI helps a friends of Sophie's to get out of a difficult contract.
9	9	"The Happy Couple"	Rob Greenlea	Allan Heinberg	May 19, 2016	4.04
Sybil Griffiths, Margot and Rhys's mother, comes to town and orders Rhys and Ben, who's working with the FBI to take the Kensington Firm down in exchange for blanket immunity, to secure invitations for a high-profile wedding for a mysterious con. Rhys and Ben have to pose as a couple and convince Stephanie and Morgan, the engaged couple, not to call off the wedding. Alice discovers that Margot has replaced her therapist and together with Dao and the rest of the AVI team, she sets out to catch the woman that's ruined her life. Margot teams up with Reggie and Leah to get rid of their counterfeit money when Alice gets too close, but AVI outsmarts her and she gets arrested. Ben tries to get her to accept a deal like his, but she refuses. Sybil stages a prison break and, having learnt from Margot that Ben's working with the FBI, has Rhys threaten Alice for real in order to keep Ben in line.
10	10	"The Wedding"	Kevin Dowling	Allan Heinberg	May 19, 2016	4.04
Sybil moves forward with her big wedding con while Rhys spends the day with Alice so she can't interfere. However, Alice manages to escape him and warns her colleagues. Rhys realizes that Sybil will kill Ben the minute that the con's over, while Alice realizes that Sybil and the recently escaped Margot will also come after her and her team. With Dao thrown off the case and the corrupt FBI agents working for Sybil, the AVI team and Dao have no choice but to infiltrate the wedding, where Rhys decides to switch sides and help save Ben's life. Alice and Ben have Sybil arrested in the middle of her con, but Margot manages to get away with the groom's criminal mother's money. Alice and Ben renew their engagement plan a long getaway with Rhys so the FBI can't get to Ben before his name is cleared. With her mother arrested, Margot has become the new head of the Kensington Firm and calls in an anonymous tip about the stolen painting in Alice's bedroom, which leads to Alice's arrest. Moments before Alice is taken away by the FBI, Ben arrives to confess his crimes and he's arrested instead.

=== Season 2 (2017) ===
No. overall	No. in season	Title	Directed by	Written by	Original release date	US viewers (millions)
11	1	"The New Deal"	Rob Bowman	Allan Heinberg	March 9, 2017	3.67
FBI Special Agent Justine Diaz has a deal for Ben, which gets him out of prison right away in exchange for staging cons and tipping off the FBI so they can arrest criminals. His work on Ben's case gets Jules Dao promoted, but it comes with moving to D.C. Rhys stages a prison break to get Ben out, thus ruining the latter's deal with the FBI. In exchange for help from within the prison, Rhys promised Ben's help on a snatch and grab con with a surprising twist. This leads to the FBI being able to arrest a criminal, meaning the deal with Ben's back on the table. Meanwhile, Alice's brother Tommy comes to town for his sister's help when he discovers someone created a bank account in his name with three million dollars in it. Valerie focuses on getting AVI up and running again after the FBI investigation into the firm caused them to lose all their clients.
12	2	"The Hammer"	John Stuart Scott	Jim Campolongo	March 16, 2017	3.81
After Margot's latest lieutenant/lover is shot and killed, she is convinced that the target was herself and wants to hire AVI to find the killer. With AVI lacking clients and money, Alice and Valerie reluctantly take the case. They track down an assassin nicknamed "The Hammer", eventually cornering and capturing him, but he won't give up who hired him. Agent Diaz assigns Ben and Rhys to pull a con on a Japanese restaurateur whose operation is a front for smugglers. The two shun Diaz's suggestions and decide to run the con their own way. Meanwhile, Tommy makes a move on a vulnerable Sophie after she gets angry with Danny for abandoning her. It turns out, Danny was digging up info on Tommy's former dog-walking employers, who were murdered, revealing they were working for drug dealers. At the end of the episode, Tommy reveals he tricked Sophie so he could get access to the $3 million that is in his name.
13	3	"The Dining Hall"	Jann Turner	David Hemingson	March 23, 2017	3.41
Ben, Rhys, and Justine look into the diamond smuggling and discover ties with the Japanese consul general. They set up an exclusive dining experience to attract the consul general through her son in order to convince her to use them as a new front for her operation, but they are thrown for a loop when it turns out she's not the one behind the contraband operation. AVI uncovers Tommy's ties to the Southland Cartel and they're caught in a race against time when one of the Cartel's lieutenants goes after Tommy, who has disappeared using his new identity. Sophie and Danny work with Margot and The Hammer to find out who paid The Hammer to kill Margot. By hacking into a bank's CCTV footage, they get a look at the woman when she makes her second payment, but nobody recognizes her.
14	4	"The Family Way"	Allison Liddi-Brown	Rina Mimoun	March 30, 2017	3.40
Alice and Ben ask for Margot's help to save Rhys. While the rest of the team attempts to track down and capture the woman who wants Margot dead, Alice is preoccupied when her brother gets out of jail after her ex-boyfriend Ethan paid bail. Tommy is set on getting the money, but he's still threatened by Theo Tasker from the Southland Cartel, forcing Alice to take on Tasker with a favor from Ethan. As Ben and Rhys work to become involved with Jesse and Yumi's contraband operation, Margot interferes in an unexpected way, leading to a heated argument between her and Ben. Meanwhile, Margot and Danny continue their sexual relationship, and Tommy makes an important decision that heavily impacts his relationship with Alice. The identity of the mystery woman surprises everyone.
15	5	"The Bad Girl"	Sharat Raju	Ameni Rozsa	April 6, 2017	3.56
The AVI team checks Margot's alleged daughter's background story and finds that she speaks the truth about growing up with terrible foster parents after Sybil sold her to the couple. Tessa states she went after Margot because she's responsible for her horrible childhood. Through a text on her phone, the team finds that she works with Felix, one of the Firm's lieutenants. Margot goes to visit her mother in prison and learns she's being extradited soon while Tessa talks to Alice about Ben being her father. Felix attempts to kill Sybil for Tessa, but Danny and Margot save her. After a heart-to-heart with her own mother, Margot realizes she doesn't need a test to know that Tessa is hers. Rhys, Ben, and Justine team up with top criminal and sex addict Chloe Jackson, only to have her betray them. Ben plans to buy an overwater villa for him and Alice, but she tells him to hold off on that. Margot introduces him to their daughter as Alice sees her envisioned future shattered to pieces.
16	6	"The Hard Drive"	Steve Robin	Danny Tolli	April 13, 2017	3.15
AVI helps Nicholas and examines the one case that could pose a threat to him becoming Chief of Police. The case involves the death of a fellow police officer that involved Alice's ex-boyfriend Ethan and that got dropped under mysterious circumstances. As the team digs deeper, parts of Alice's past that she's not proud of surface, and the team reflects on how they met one another. Meanwhile, a security breach with the FBI poses a threat to Rhys's and Ben's CI status. With Justine, they set out to investigate the company behind the breach and destroy their servers, only to discover that the company uses a young man with an eidetic memory as a human hard drive. Meanwhile, Margot has a hard time leading the Kensington Firm while dealing with her mother and Tessa, who insists on becoming part of the Firm.
17	7	"The Birthday Party"	John Stuart Scott	Lyndsey Beaulieu	April 20, 2017	2.98
AVI is hired by Ethan Ward to find out who leaked confidential information that damages his business, Sophie admits she had her friend Heather hack into his systems when they were looking into him for Nicholas Turner. When Heather is found dead, Danny asks for Margot's help to figure out who did it and the hunt for the killer begins. Margot herself has Tessa infiltrate a sweet sixteen party organized by a crime family to gain intel, but she and Ben have to interfere when she gets caught planting microphones. Meanwhile, Rhys and Troy help Justine track down her husband Eddie, who broke things off in an e-mail and disappeared while on an undercover mission. Eddie's supposed betrayal makes Rhys think about Felicity, who coincidentally pays Margot a visit.
18	8	"The Knock-Off"	Nzingha Stewart	Morgan Pollitt & Alexander Newman-Wise	April 27, 2017	2.99
Ethan introduces Alice to his fiancée Gretchen and asks AVI to vet an angel investor for Gretchen's newfound fashion business. With help from Tessa, they discover that the investor has been sued for Human Rights violations and is thus to be avoided. Ethan soon offers Gretchen a big amount of money to help her realize her dream, and Alice can't shake the feeling that Gretchen has been after Ethan's money all along. Margot works with Felicity to steal an expensive bottle of rare scotch from an underground speakeasy to impress Matthew Keegan, whom she's heard is looking for a new supplier, only to discover that Matthew has already made a deal with a mysterious man named Mockingbird. Ben, Rhys, Troy, and Justine set their plan to extract Justine's husband from Argosy in motion, but it backfires gravely. Meanwhile, Sophie discovers that Danny is involved with Margot and Ethan learns about the history of Ben and Alice, leading to a confrontation.
19	9	"The Cleaner"	Rob Greenlea	Jon Dorsey & Greg Goetz	May 4, 2017	2.96
The AVI team discover their working relationship with Margot isn't as clean as they'd like; Alice finds herself on the receiving end of a life-altering confession.
20	10	"The Mockingbird"	John Stuart Scott	Allan Heinberg	May 11, 2017	2.96
Alice and Ben have no choice but to face their pasts; a stunning betrayal could change everything.

== Reception ==
=== Critical response ===
The Catch has been met with generally positive reviews from critics, with most praising Mireille Enos' leading performance. Metacritic gave season one of the show a score of 59 out of 100 based on 30 reviews, indicating "mixed or average reviews". The review aggregator website Rotten Tomatoes reports a 72% approval rating. The site's general consensus reads:

While the jury is out on its weekly worthiness, The Catch largely yields satisfying results with tried-and-true Shondaland production qualities, fun cases of the week, and bendy plot twists.

=== Ratings ===
==== Overall ====
Viewership and ratings per season of The Catch
Season	Timeslot (ET)	Episodes	First aired		Last aired		TV season	Viewership rank	Avg. viewers (millions)
Season	Timeslot (ET)	Episodes	Date	Viewers (millions)	Date	Viewers (millions)	TV season	Viewership rank	Avg. viewers (millions)
1	Thursday 10:00 p.m. (Note: The ninth episode of the first season aired on Thursday 9:00 pm.)	10	March 24, 2016	5.85	May 19, 2016	4.04	2015–16	TBD	TBD
2	Thursday 10:00 p.m.	10	March 9, 2017	3.67	May 11, 2017	2.96	2016–17	TBD	TBD

==== Season 1 ====
Viewership and ratings per episode of The Catch
No.	Title	Air date	Viewers (millions)
1	"Pilot"	March 24, 2016	5.85
2	"The Real Killer"	March 31, 2016	5.07
3	"The Trial"	April 7, 2016	4.89
4	"The Princess and the I.P."	April 14, 2016	4.76
5	"The Larágan Gambit"	April 21, 2016	4.60
6	"The Benefactor"	April 28, 2016	4.58
7	"The Ringer"	May 5, 2016	4.36
8	"The Package"	May 12, 2016	4.23
9	"The Happy Couple"	May 19, 2016	4.04
10	"The Wedding"	May 19, 2016	4.04

==== Season 2 ====
Viewership and ratings per episode of The Catch
No.	Title	Air date	Viewers (millions)
1	"The New Deal"	March 9, 2017	3.67
2	"The Hammer"	March 16, 2017	3.81
3	"The Dining Hall"	March 23, 2017	3.41
4	"The Family Way"	March 30, 2017	3.40
5	"The Bad Girl"	April 6, 2017	3.56
6	"The Hard Drive"	April 13, 2017	3.15
7	"The Birthday Party"	April 20, 2017	2.98
8	"The Knock-Off"	April 27, 2017	2.99
9	"The Cleaner"	May 4, 2017	2.96
10	"The Mockingbird"	May 11, 2017	2.96
