= Mandy Musgrave =

American actress and singer

- Occupations: Actress, singer
- Years active: 2004–2014; 2019; 2025
- Spouse: Matt Cohen (m. 2011)
- Children: 1

Mandy Musgrave is an American actress and singer. Best known for her portrayal of Ashley Davies on the television series South of Nowhere, as well as portraying Misty Monroe in the web series Girltrash! and the film Girltrash: All Night Long, she has also appeared on a number of shows as a guest star.

== Career ==
She appeared on the television show CSI: Crime Scene Investigation. Her big break came when she landed the role of Chelsea Benson on the daytime drama Days of Our Lives, appearing on the series from 2004 to 2005. In addition, Musgrave appeared on The King of Queens in 2005. Later that year, she debuted on South of Nowhere as Ashley Davies.

In 2007, Musgrave appeared opposite of her South of Nowhere love interest Gabrielle Christian in web series Girltrash!. Musgrave portrayed actress Misty Monroe; Christian played college graduate Colby Robson. In 2014, Musgrave and Christian reprised their roles in a new musical film called Girltrash: All Night Long by Angela Robinson.

Musgrave also starred in Dan's Detour of Life, a webseries comedy written by the producers of That '70s Show. She portrayed Jessie Ford, a 15-year-old high school student dealing with her parents' abrupt divorce. In 2010, Musgrave was cast in a guest role on the television series 90210. She appeared in three episodes as Alexa, Gia's ex-girlfriend. In 2019, Musgrave was cast as Carol Lockhart on General Hospital.

In 2019, Musgrave starred as the lead role in the indie short film Mama Bear, written by Lee Ehlers and directed by her partner, Matt Cohen. The film follows a suburban mother who must unexpectedly secure a liver transplant for her dying son, who has only 24 hours to live. The film first was premiered at the HollyShorts Film Festival on August 13, 2019, and then was released to the public on September 1, 2019.

== Personal life ==
Musgrave spends time with South of Nowhere co-stars Gabrielle Christian, Maeve Quinlan, and Matt Cohen. Musgrave married Cohen on May 18, 2011. She gave birth to the couple's son in April 2015.

== Filmography ==
=== Film ===
Year	Title	Role	Notes
2006	Pope Dreams	Virginia Venable	
2009	16 to Life	Darby	
2012	Chutes and Ladders	Teacher #1	Short film
2013	Windsor Drive	June	
2014	Girltrash: All Night Long	Misty Monroe	
2014	Hard Crime	Ms. Hammer	
2019	Mama Bear	Mom	Short film
2025	Public Domain	The Little Mermaid	TV Movie

=== Television ===
Year	Title	Role	Notes
2004–2005	Days of Our Lives	Chelsea Brady	Regular role (195 episodes)
2005	The King of Queens	Suzie	Episode: "Hi, School"
2005	CSI: Crime Scene Investigation	Jackie Ryan	Episode: "4x4"
2005–2008	South of Nowhere	Ashley Davies	Main cast
2008	Dan's Detour of Life	Jessie Ford	TV movie
2009	Eli Stone	Tessa	Episode: "Tailspin"
2010	The Middle	Kate	Episodes: "The Neighbor", "The Jeans"
2010	90210	Alexa	3 episodes
2019	General Hospital	Carol Lockhart	4 episodes

=== Web ===
Year	Title	Role	Notes
2007–2009	Girltrash!	Misty Monroe	Recurring role
2008	3 Way	Trouble	2 episodes
2009	Rockville CA	Jackie	Episode: "D List"
2011–2013	Cowgirl Up	Dakota	Recurring role

== Awards and nominations ==
Year	Award	Category	Result	ref
2007	1st Annual Wave Awards, Academy of Wireless Arts, Video and Entertainment	Favorite Mobile Dramatic Artist, "South of Nowhere"	Won	
