= Redwood Highway (film) =

- Directed by: Gary Lundgren
- Written by: Gary Lundgren; James Twyman
- Produced by: James Twyman
- Starring: Shirley Knight; James LeGros; Zena Grey; Michelle Lombardo; Sam Daly; Tom Skerritt
- Cinematography: Patrick Neary
- Edited by: Gary Lundgren
- Production company: Redwood Highway
- Distributed by: Monterey Media
- Release date: April 5, 2013
- Country: United States
- Language: English
- Box office: $131,698

Redwood Highway is a 2013 American independent drama film directed by Gary Lundgren, produced by James Twyman, and written by Lundgren and Twyman. The film stars Shirley Knight and Tom Skerritt.

== Plot ==
Living in a comfortable retirement community in southern Oregon, estranged from her family, unsatisfied with her surroundings, and generally not happy about life, Marie (Shirley Knight) decides to journey 60 miles on foot to the coast of Oregon to see the ocean for the first time in 45 years and attend her granddaughter's wedding as an unexpected guest. Along the way, she meets an extraordinary cast of characters and discovers that you're never too old to learn something about life and about yourself.

== Cast ==
- Shirley Knight as Marie Vaughn
- Tom Skerritt as Pete
- James LeGros as Michael Vaughn
- Zena Grey as Naomi Vaughn
- Michelle Lombardo as Stacia
- Sam Daly as Buck
- Brent Hinkley as Mel
- Catherine E. Coulson as Suzie

== Production ==
Redwood Highway was filmed in numerous locations throughout southern Oregon, including Ashland, Talent, Phoenix, Grants Pass, Cave Junction, and Brookings. The filmmakers and most of the crew members involved are from southern Oregon.

== Release ==
In October 2013, Monterey Media bought the United States distribution rights and will release the film in the United States and Canada. The film will be released in theaters in the United States and Canada in April 2014.

=== Festivals ===
Redwood Highway was selected to screen at the following film festivals:

- 2013 Ashland Independent Film Festival
- 2013 Mt Rainier Film Festival
- 2013 Northwest Film Forum Local Sightings Film Festival
- 2013 Tacoma Film Festival
- 2014 Sedona International Film Festival

== Reception ==
On the review aggregator website Rotten Tomatoes, 80% of 10 critics' reviews are positive, with an average rating of 6.3/10.
