= Allan Heinberg =

American screenwriter, television writer and producer, and comic book writer

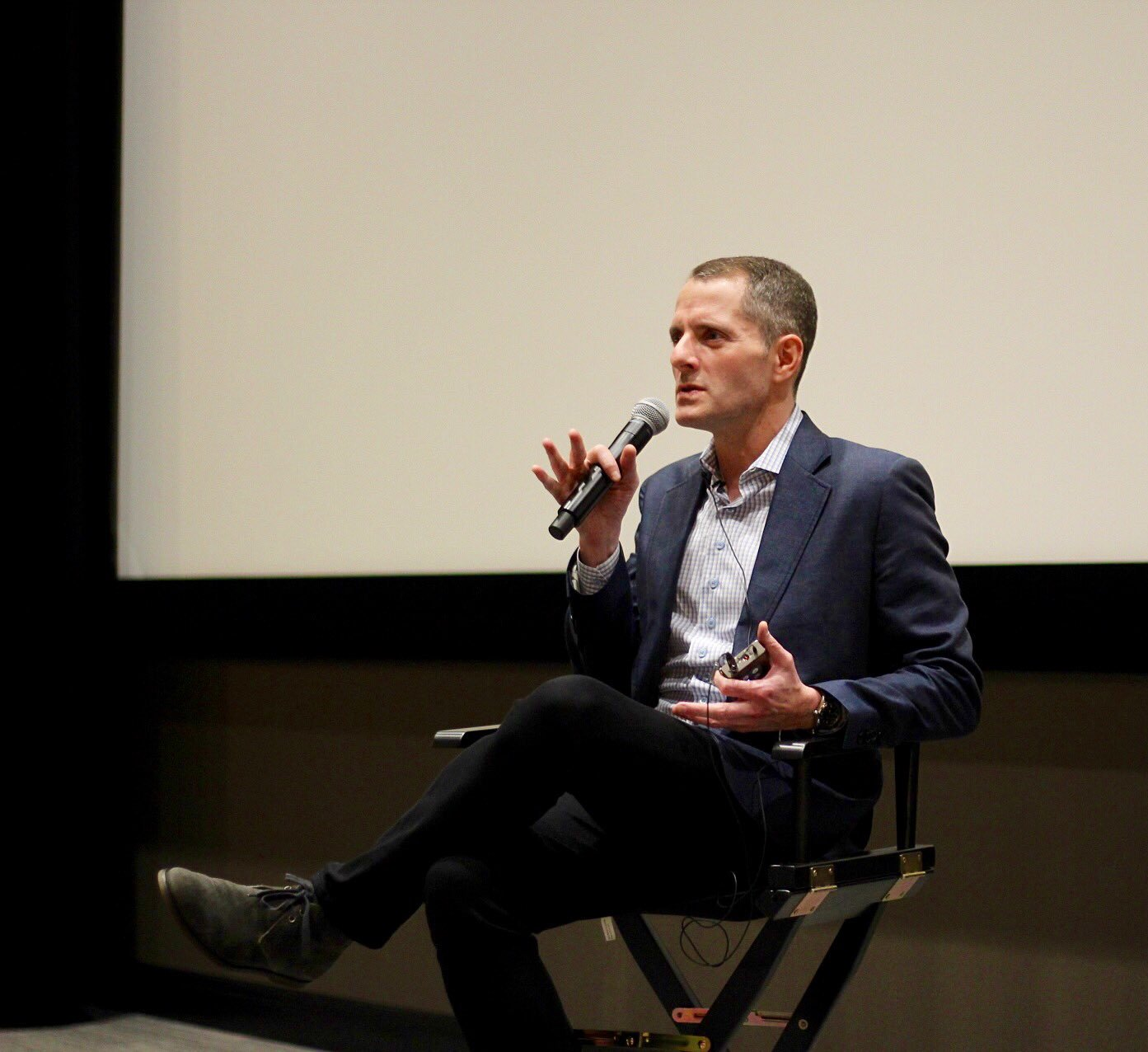
- Allan Heinberg at Belmont University in 2017
- Born: June 29, 1967 (age 59) Tulsa, Oklahoma, U.S.
- Area: Writer

Allan Heinberg (born June 29, 1967) is an American film screenwriter, television writer and producer and comic book writer.

Heinberg is the screenwriter of the 2017 film Wonder Woman, directed by Patty Jenkins. His television writing and producing credits include The Naked Truth, Party of Five, Sex and the City, Gilmore Girls, The O.C., Grey's Anatomy, Looking, and Scandal. Heinberg developed, wrote, and ran ABC's The Catch, starring Mireille Enos and Peter Krause and also developed the 2022 Netflix series The Sandman.

For Marvel Comics, Heinberg co-created and wrote Young Avengers and its sequel, Avengers: The Children's Crusade with co-creator/artist Jim Cheung. As part of this series, he co-created the characters Kate Bishop, Hulkling, Iron Lad, Patriot (Eli Bradley), Speed, and Wiccan. For DC Comics, Heinberg co-wrote JLA: Crisis of Conscience with Geoff Johns (art by Chris Batista), and re-launched Wonder Woman with artists Terry Dodson and Rachel Dodson.

== Early life ==
Heinberg is a graduate of Booker T. Washington High School in Tulsa, Oklahoma and Yale University class of 1989. He was in Morse College. Heinberg acted in the Broadway cast of Laughter on the 23rd Floor and appeared off-Broadway in Hello Muddah, Hello Fadduh and the Vineyard Theatre's production of Bob Merrill's Hannah...1939 starring Julie Wilson.

== Career ==
=== Theatre ===
A stageplay called The Amazon's Voice helped launch Heinberg's screenwriting career in 1994. The play was produced off-Broadway by the Manhattan Class Company and featured Tim Blake Nelson and Ellen Parker in lead roles.

=== Comics ===
Heinberg's Young Avengers was a sales success and fan favorite for Marvel Comics. He returned to write for the Young Avengers during the 2010–2011 Children's Crusade storyline.

After co-writing a 5-issue arc of DC Comics's JLA with Geoff Johns, Heinberg and artist Terry Dodson relaunched Wonder Woman following the Infinite Crisis limited series.

Heinberg won the 2005 Wizard Fan Award for Breakout Talent for Young Avengers.

=== Television ===
On television, Heinberg worked on The Naked Truth, Party of Five, Sex and the City, Gilmore Girls, The O.C., Grey's Anatomy, Looking, Scandal and The Catch, and served as executive producer of The CW's pilot for their Wonder Woman origin series Amazon in 2012, but the pilot was not picked up for a series. In 2019, it was announced that Heinberg would develop a television adaptation of The Sandman for Netflix. He also executive produced the series with Neil Gaiman and David S. Goyer.

=== Film ===
Heinberg wrote the screenplay for the 2017 superhero film Wonder Woman, as well as co-wrote the story with Zack Snyder and Jason Fuchs.

== Filmography ==
=== Film ===
Year	Film	Credit	Notes
2012	Blue Like Jazz	Special thanks	
2017	Playing It Straight	Very special thanks	Short film
2017	Thirst	Special thanks	Short film
2017	Wonder Woman	Screenplay by Story by	Co-wrote story with Zack Snyder and Jason Fuchs

=== Television ===
Year	Film	Credit	
1997–1998	The Naked Truth	Written by	
1998–2000	Party of Five	Story editor, written by, story by, co-producer, producer	
2000–2002	Sex and the City	Creative consultant, written by, supervising producer	
2000	Grosse Pointe	Creative consultant	
2002	Gilmore Girls	Written by	
2006–2010	Grey's Anatomy	Written by, executive producer, co-executive producer, consulting producer	
2006	Grey's Anatomy: Straight to the Heart	Consulting producer	TV movie
2006	Grey's Anatomy: Under Pressure	Consulting producer	TV movie
2006	Grey's Anatomy: Complications of the Heart	Consulting producer	TV movie
2007	Grey's Anatomy: Every Moment Counts	Co-executive producer	TV movie
2007	Grey's Anatomy: Come Rain or Shine	Co-executive producer	TV movie
2016–2017	The Catch	Developed by, executive producer, written by	
2021	Hawkeye	Created Kate Bishop (uncredited)	
2022	The Sandman	Developed by, executive producer, written by	

=== Video games ===
Year	Film	Credit	Notes
2013	Marvel Heroes	Characters created by, uncredited	Characters: Katherine "Kate" Bishop/Hawkeye and William "Billy" Kaplan/Wiccan
2016	Lego Marvel's Avengers	Characters created by, uncredited	Characters: Katherine "Kate" Bishop/Hawkeye, William "Billy" Kaplan/Wiccan, Dorrek VIII/Theodore "Teddy" Altman/Hulkling and Thomas "Tommy" Shepherd/Speed
2016	Lego Marvel Super Heroes 2	Characters created by, uncredited	Characters: Katherine "Kate" Bishop/Hawkeye, William "Billy" Kaplan/Wiccan and Dorrek VIII/Theodore "Teddy" Altman/Hulkling

Preceded by Greg Rucka	Wonder Woman writer 2006–2007	Succeeded by Jodi Picoult
