= Unplanned Parenthood (House) =

- House episode
- Episode no.: Season 7 Episode 5
- Directed by: Greg Yaitanes
- Written by: David Foster
- Original air date: October 18, 2010

Guest appearances
- Jennifer Grey as Abbey; Gabrielle Christian as Justine; Keiko Agena as Dr. Cheng; Vernée Watson as Nurse Smits; Charlene Amoia as Dr. Christina Fraser

Episode chronology
← Previous "Massage Therapy"	Next → "Office Politics"
- House season 7

"Unplanned Parenthood" is the fifth episode of the seventh season of the American medical drama House. It first aired on Fox on October 18, 2010.

== Plot ==
The episode starts with Abbey (Jennifer Grey) giving birth to a baby in a hospital, in the company of her adult daughter Justine (Gabrielle Christian) who is later implied to be a result of an unplanned pregnancy. The baby experiences breathing problems, which House and his team conclude is caused by pulmonary edema secondary to a liver failure causing insufficient production of plasma proteins. They suspect Caroli disease to be the underlying cause of the liver failure, but fail to confirm it, leaving the case still inexplicable.

Meanwhile, following Cuddy's directive, House challenges Foreman and Taub to hire a female doctor to join the team. When Cuddy asks House to babysit her daughter, Rachel, both House and Wilson learn a few hard lessons in parenting.

While babysitting, House is momentarily distracted by trying to leave Wilson to babysit Rachel, and Rachel makes a mess of his Chinese takeout food. Wilson pulls a coin from her mouth and fears she has swallowed the change from the Chinese food. House and Wilson surreptitiously keep her under observation after they think that there is a dime missing from the change, but they later realize that they had miscalculated the bill and that all of the change was accounted for.

House decides to buy time by transfusing the newborn with the mother's blood. The baby improves but the team is unsure why.

The mother has melanoma, a mole under her finger nail, which has been passed to the baby. She is unusually healthy for someone with late-stage melanoma, and the team discover it is because she also has lung cancer which is causing antibodies to be created which are fighting off the melanoma and giving her blood an added factor which helped the baby. The team recommends surgery to treat her lung cancer and chemotherapy for the baby, but she opts to postpone the surgery for nine days in order to continue transfusions until the baby fully recovers. She dies unexpectedly of a pulmonary embolism, but her blood harvested at autopsy is enough to cure her baby. Justine, apparently having practically become an unplanned parent, holds her baby sister in her arms.

Later, House and Cuddy are asleep and one has to go check on Rachel. House lets Cuddy do so, and over the baby monitor he hears Cuddy exclaim, "What? How did you eat a dime?" To which Rachel replies, "House", closing the episode with House's eyes opening in surprise.

== Critical response ==
Zack Handlen at The A.V. Club rated the episode C+.
