= Chris Hunter (actor) =

American actor

- Born: Tacoma, Washington, U.S.
- Occupation: Actor
- Years active: 2000–2009

Chris B. Hunter is an American actor who is most known for co-starring in The N original series South of Nowhere as Glen Carlin. He has also made guest appearances in other shows including 7th Heaven, Boston Public, That's So Raven, Phil of the Future, Just for Kicks and The Amanda Show. He also co-starred in the Disney Channel Original Movie Buffalo Dreams.

== Television ==
Year	Title	Role	Notes
2000	The Amanda Show	Magician	Recurring role
2003	That's So Raven	Conrad	Guest
2003	Boston Public	Plummer	Guest
2003	Phil of the Future	Tanner Kirkpatrick	Recurring role
2005	Buffalo Dreams	Kyle	TV movie
2006	7th Heaven	Brad Stone	Guest
2006	Just for Kicks	Unknown	Guest
2005–2008	South of Nowhere	Glen Carlin	Starring Role
2007	Bones	Young Terry	Guest
2009	American Black Beauty	Carey Lane	Guest
