= What Should You Do? =

- Genre: Reality
- Written by: Aaron Kass; Monica Regal
- Directed by: Stanley Akira; Mark Cole; Hollywood Heard
- Presented by: Leeza Gibbons
- Country of origin: United States
- Original language: English
- No. of seasons: 2
- No. of episodes: 29

Production
- Executive producers: Denise Contis; Rasha Drachkovitch; Stuart Zwagil
- Producers: David Hillman; Timothy Phillips; Patrick Taulère
- Camera setup: Single-camera
- Running time: 22–24 minutes
- Production companies: 44 Blue Productions; Four Point Entertainment; Lifetime Television

Original release
- Network: Lifetime
- Release: April 1, 2003 – January 1, 2006

What Should You Do? is an American reality series that aired on Lifetime from April 2003 to January 2006.

== Overview ==
Hosted by Leeza Gibbons, the program recreates real-life stories of life-threatening or emergency situations and dilemmas, such as a car plunging off a bridge into a river or getting kidnapped and locked in a trunk, while highlighting tips and advice from experts about how to best react.
