= Valery Ortiz =

Puerto Rican actress (born 1984)

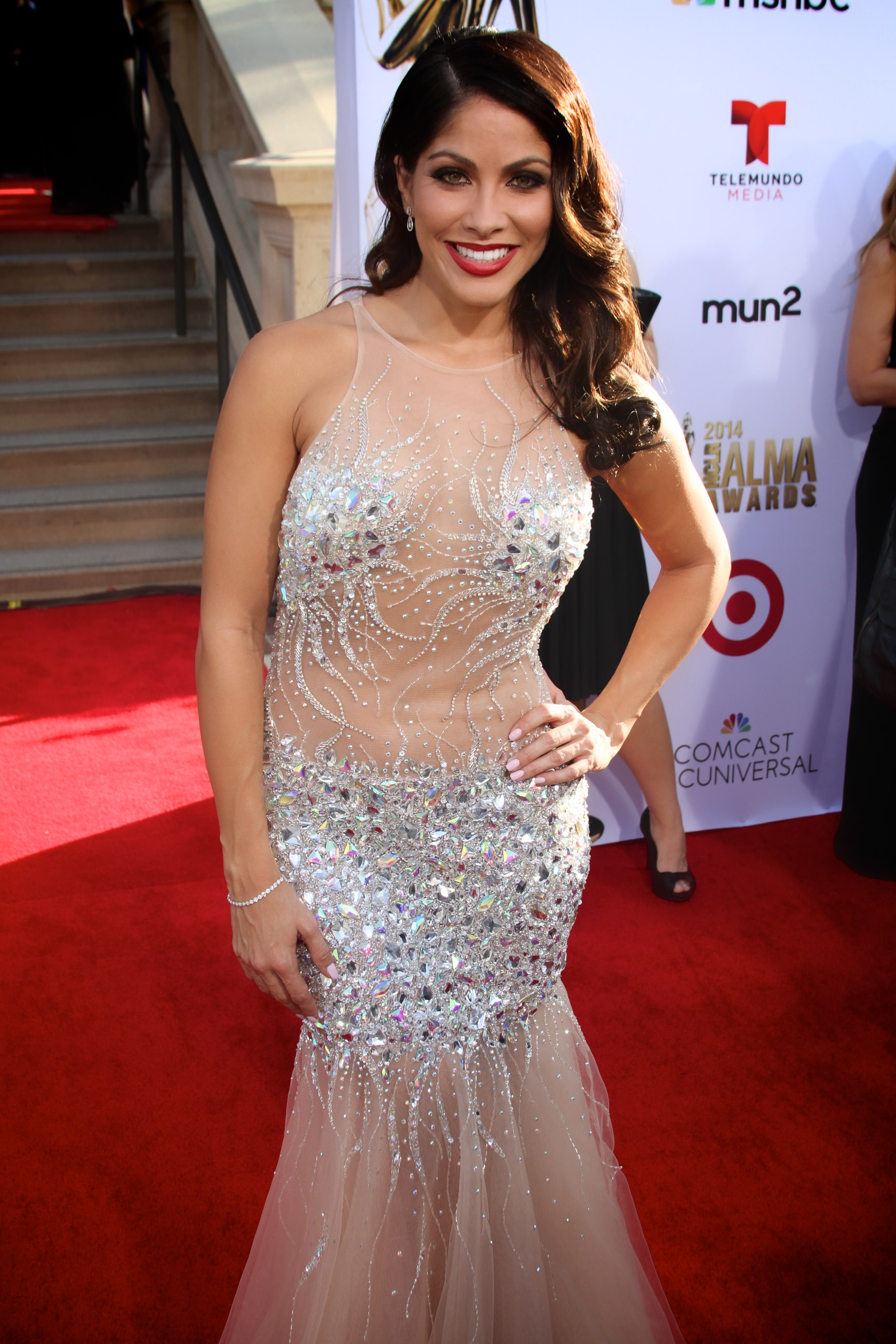
- Ortiz at the 2014 Alma Awards
- Born: Valery Milagros Ortiz; August 1, 1984 (age 42); San Juan, Puerto Rico
- Occupations: Actress, model
- Years active: 2004–present
- Spouse: Jesse Carrion (m. 2011)
- Website: www.valeryortiz.com

Valery Milagros Ortiz (born August 1, 1984) is a Puerto Rican actress and model. She has appeared in various television series including South of Nowhere (2005–2008), Diary of a Single Mom (2009–2011), Hit the Floor (2013–2016) and Gabby Duran & the Unsittables (2019–2021). Ortiz has also appeared in films including Date Movie (2006), Dumbbells (2014) and Thriller (2018).

== Early life ==
Ortiz was born in San Juan, Puerto Rico and raised in Orlando, Florida. Passionate to become a "ballerina" and she explored her dancing talents after receiving a scholarship to The Southern Ballet Theater Performing Art Centre in Orlando. She continued dancing but eased out of it in middle school as her interest in theatre and acting grew. She worked in Orlando as an extra on the Universal Studios backlot. Following in her older brother's footsteps, she was accepted into the Dr. Phillips High School performing arts magnet program. After four years of study, Ortiz began working in several productions like Latins Anonymous (Orlando Fringe Festival), West Side Story as Maria, A Midsummer Night's Dream as Helena, The Vagina Monologues (Orlando Premiere) and The Edinburgh, Scotland Fringe Festival.

== Career ==
While attending the University of Central Florida for a Bachelor in Fine Arts, Ortiz was given an opportunity to work on television show Splat! as a host. After the first season, a two-week road trip "vacation" to Los Angeles turned into permanent relocation to Los Angeles. Ortiz quickly started working on a local television show called LATV Live as a VJ.

While working at the Hard Rock Cafe as a hostess, Ortiz was cast as in the comedy Date Movie as Jell-O, a Jennifer Lopez impersonation. During the movie's filming, she was cast the television series South of Nowhere. Shortly after, she was cast in the pilot Emily's Reason's Why Not, which was picked up and aired in 2006. In 2010, she appeared on an episode of Two and a Half Men. She currently is an anchor for Si TV and E! News. Ortiz was "One of the Top 25 Latinas of 2006" from Maxim en Español. For three seasons, Ortiz portrayed the role of Raquel Saldana in Hit the Floor, a scripted VH1 series that premiered May 2013.

In August 2019, Disney Channel announced the premiere date for their new live-action comedy series Gabby Duran and the Unsittables with Ortiz set to star as Dina Duran. Ahead of the series premiere in October 2019, the show received an early season 2 renewal from Disney Channel.

== Personal life ==
Ortiz currently lives in Los Angeles, California. She enjoys reading, hiking, decorating, and writing.

== Filmography ==
=== Film ===
Year	Title	Role	Notes
2006	Date Movie	Jell-O	
2008	From a Place of Darkness	Rosa	
2013	2 Dead 2 Kill	Donna Valens	
2014	Dumbbells	Missy	
2015	Lure	Girlfriend	Short
2016	Skirtchasers	Gabriella	TV movie
2016	Peaches	Sydnee DeLeon	Short
2018	Thriller	Ms. Cruz	
2020	2 Minutes of Fame	Ms. Ellen	
2021	Old Flames Never Die	Steph	TV movie
2024	Skeletons in the Closet	Valentina	

=== Television ===
Year	Title	Role	Notes
2004	Nickelodeon SPLAT!	Herself/co-host	TV series
2005–08	South of Nowhere	Madison Duarte	Main cast
2006	Emily's Reasons Why Not	Waitress	Episode: "Pilot"
2006–07	What About Brian	Roxanne	Recurring cast: season 2
2007–09	On the Up	Herself/host	TV series
2008	10 Items or Less	Buck's Friend #2	Episode: "Forever Young"
2009	Cold Case	Marisol Acosta	Episode: "Stealing Home"
2009–11	Diary of a Single Mom	Lupe	Main cast
2010	Melissa & Joey	Celeste Vega	Episode: "Up Close & Personal"
2010	Gigantic	Kelli	Episode: "Pilot: Part 1 & 2"
2010	Two and a Half Men	Tracy	Episode: "Chocolate Diddlers or My Puppy's Dead"
2010–16	American Latino TV	Herself/host	TV series
2011	In the Flow with Affion Crockett	J-Lo/Kim Kardashian 2011	Episode: "No Rush!"
2013	Cowgirl Up	Maddie	Main cast: season 2
2013	Cltrl.Alt.Del	Catalina	Episode: "Do You See What I See?"
2013–16	Hit the Floor	Raquel Saldana	Main cast: season 1-3
2016	Agents of S.H.I.E.L.D.	Maria	Episode: "Uprising"
2017	Switched at Birth	Noelle	Recurring cast: season 5
2017	If Loving You Is Wrong	Tippa Haynes	Recurring cast: season 2
2018	NCIS	Carrie	Episode: "Dark Secrets"
2019	Going Up	Vanessa	Recurring cast: season 1
2019	Five Points	Valeria	Recurring cast: season 2
2019–21	Gabby Duran & the Unsittables	Dina Duran	Main cast
