= POWER UP =

US film production company

- Founded: 2000
- Founder: K. Pearson Brown; Stacy Codikow; Amy Shomer
- Type: 501(c)(3) non-profit organization
- Purpose: Motion pictures
- Location: Los Angeles, California, U.S.
- Method: Funding, producing
- Key people: Stacy Codikow, Executive Director; Lisa Thrasher, President of Film Production & Distribution
- Website: www.powerupfilms.org

POWER UP (the "Professional Organization of Women in Entertainment Reaching Up") is an American non-profit organization and film production company with the stated mission "to promote the visibility and integration of gay women in entertainment, the arts, and all forms of media". It was founded in 2000 by K. Pearson Brown, Stacy Codikow, and Amy Shomer. Its all-volunteer membership includes women and men, gay and straight.

POWER UP provides funding and assistance to filmmakers and produces its own films. After several short films, its first feature film was the comedy Itty Bitty Titty Committee directed by Jamie Babbit. In 2004, POWER UP was awarded the Leadership Award by the National Gay and Lesbian Task Force.

In 2001, K. Pearson Brown, one of the founding members, brought a sexual harassment suit against another founding member, Stacey Codikow. Codikow counter-sued, alleging that Brown had made sexual overtures towards her and accusing Brown of defamation. Codikow also demanded Brown's resignation on the grounds that she was bisexual. Brown denied Codikow's allegations, but resigned from the organization. Both lawsuits were dropped in late 2002.

== Films ==
- 2001: Stuck – Jamie Babbit
- 2001: Chicken Night – Lisa Ginsburg
- 2001: Breaking Up Really Sucks – Jennifer McGlone
- 2003: Give or Take an Inch – Lee Friedlander
- 2003: Fly Cherry – Jessica Sharzer
- 2003: D.E.B.S. – Angela Robinson
- 2003: Intent – Mary Ann Marino
- 2004: Little Black Boot – Colette Burson
- 2004: The Nearly Unadventurous Life of Zoe Cadwaulder – Buboo Kakati
- 2004: Billy's Dad Is a Fudge-Packer – Jamie Donahue
- 2005: Promtroversy – Leanna Creel
- 2005: Starcrossed – James Burkhammer
- 2007: Itty Bitty Titty Committee – Jamie Babbit
- 2008: The Nitty Gritty Behind the Itty Bitty Titty Committee – Lisa Thrasher
- 2014: Girltrash: All Night Long – Alexandra Kondracke

== See also ==
- List of LGBT-related organizations
