= South of Nowhere =

2005 – 2008 American teen drama television series created by Thomas W. Lynch

- Created by: Thomas W. Lynch
- Starring: Gabrielle Christian; Mandy Musgrave; Matt Cohen; Chris Hunter; Rob Moran; Maeve Quinlan; Valery Ortiz; Danso Gordon (seasons 1–2); Austen Parros (seasons 1–2); Eileen April Boylan (seasons 2–3); Aasha Davis (seasons 2–3)
- Opening theme: "I Don't Want to Know (If You Don't Want Me)"; The Donnas (season 1, broadcast) "Lift Me Up"; Gena Olivier (season 1, DVD) "Wasted"; L.P. (seasons 2–3)
- Country of origin: United States
- Original language: English
- No. of seasons: 3
- No. of episodes: 40 (list of episodes)

Production
- Running time: 22 minutes
- Production companies: Noggin LLC; Tom Lynch Company

Original release
- Network: The N (Noggin)
- Release: November 4, 2005 – December 12, 2008

South of Nowhere is an American teen drama television series created by Thomas W. Lynch. It first aired on November 4, 2005, on Noggin as part of its teen programming block, The N. The show was produced by Noggin LLC in association with the creator's studio, Tom Lynch Company. It ran for three seasons and 40 episodes in total, the last of which aired on December 12, 2008. Live webisodes were also created to accompany each episode in the season-two storyline, and were seen exclusively through The N's website on the Click.

The show follows the lives of the members of the Carlin family (Paula, Arthur, Glen, Clay, and Spencer) as they adjust to moving from Ohio to Los Angeles, California. One of the main focuses include the relationship between Spencer Carlin (Gabrielle Christian) and her bisexual friend, Ashley Davies (Mandy Musgrave). The close friendship between Ashley and Spencer led Spencer to question her own sexuality, a subject which created controversy before the show first aired. It was the first series on The N to deal with such a subject relating to the primary characters. South of Nowhere was positively reviewed by publications such as Variety, The Boston Globe, and The New York Times.

Rare for a teen series, but fitting with Noggin/The N's goals as a "thinking channel", the show was created with loose educational goals in mind. Parent discussion guides were available for each episode on The N's website. The guides offered tips and questions about the topics raised in South of Nowhere, especially those centered around sexual identity, to use as discussion starters with teenagers.

== Plot ==
The main cast (season two)

The series begins with the Carlins moving to Los Angeles. The Carlin children transfer to a Los Angeles school called King High. The father, Arthur, works as a social worker and school counselor. The mother, Paula, initiated the move to accept a lucrative job in the emergency room of a Los Angeles hospital. Throughout the series, Arthur and Paula struggle to keep their family happy and together in their new environment.

The youngest Carlin child, Spencer, befriends a bisexual girl named Ashley Davies. Ashley is the jaded, neglected daughter of a famous rock star. As her friendship with Ashley develops into a romance, Spencer begins to question her sexuality. When she figures out that she is gay, Clay and Arthur support her, while Glen and Paula struggle to understand it at first and take time to realize the error of their ways. Spencer's relationship with Ashley introduces her to Aiden Dennison, who was once Ashley's boyfriend, as well as to Kyla Woods, Ashley's estranged half-sister, who debuts in season two. Spencer and Ashley's storylines involve topics of homosexuality, homophobia, peer pressure, religion, romance, and high school.

The middle child, Clay, was adopted by the Carlins and is African-American. He is a straight-A student and cares deeply about his future and his family. He becomes best friends with a movie buff named Sean Miller, and he dates an aspiring artist named Chelsea Lewis. Clay constantly wonders about his birth mother, which drives him to find out her identity and meet with her. When Clay discovers that his birth mother chose to give him up for adoption because she was a teen parent, he is hurt by her treatment of him, but they eventually make partial amends. At the end of the second season, Clay is murdered in a drive-by shooting at prom, deeply affecting his family and friends for the remainder of the series. Clay's storylines, as well as Sean and Chelsea's, deal with topics of racism, abortion, adoption, teen pregnancy, hate crimes, and stepfamilies.

The eldest child, Glen, is the athlete of the family. He joins the basketball team and quickly upstages the former star player, Aiden. Glen begins to date the captain of the cheerleading squad, Madison Duarte, and is sought after by colleges for his basketball skills. During an impromptu basketball match, though, Glen injures his leg and is unable to play. He becomes addicted to the painkillers to which he is prescribed, which leads to him losing his basketball dreams by the time he graduates. As a graduate, Glen plans to join the army, but later decides against it, eventually choosing to work at a sporting goods store. Glen's storylines involve topics of drugs, drug dealing, arrests, college, stress, and the military.

== Episodes ==
Season	Episodes	Originally aired	
Season	Episodes	First aired	Last aired
1	11	November 4, 2005	February 3, 2006
2	13	September 29, 2006	December 22, 2006
3	16	August 10, 2007	December 12, 2008

== Cast ==
- Gabrielle Christian as Spencer Carlin
- Mandy Musgrave as Ashley Davies
- Matt Cohen as Aiden Dennison
- Chris Hunter as Glen Carlin
- Danso Gordon as Clay Carlin (seasons 1–2; guest star in season 3)
- Rob Moran as Arthur Carlin
- Maeve Quinlan as Paula Carlin
- Austen Parros as Sean Miller (seasons 1–2; recurring in season 3)
- Valery Ortiz as Madison Duarte
- Aasha Davis as Chelsea Lewis (season 3; recurring in seasons 1-2)
- Eileen April Boylan as Kyla Woods (seasons 2–3)

== History ==
=== Production ===
Thomas Lynch said, "I believe The N is the only network bold and daring enough to air this series, and I'm thrilled to be collaborating with them." He said that Amy Friedman, the creative director of Noggin and The N, "showed no fear about the idea" of a coming-out storyline; her main focus was ensuring that the subject matter was treated respectfully.

Tom Ascheim, the general manager of Noggin and The N, said that South of Nowhere represented how he wanted The N block to present itself. In an interview with The New York Times, Ascheim said that the show "doesn't preach...it doesn't pretend it's doing something particularly heroic...it just kind of says, 'Hi, here we are, being who we are.'" Likewise, Friedman called the show "definitional" to the block.

Each episode of South of Nowhere is half an hour in length with commercials (23–25 minutes of actual program). The pilot episode was produced as two episode segments and runs for one hour (about 46 minutes of actual program). Noggin LLC initially ordered 11 episodes of the series for its The N block, which aired on Fridays at 8:30 p.m.

On February 27, 2008, The N's podcast, The N'Sider Podcast, announced that South of Nowhere was to be cancelled after the end of season three. On February 28, an official announcement was made on the show's website that it would be the last season.

"Things change. It doesn't always seem good, but change they do. South of Nowhere has been a great journey. A show like this could not have existed ten years ago on youth oriented television or any television for that matter. But exist it does, because things change. I have loved my experience with The N for having the courage and vision to air South. I love the fans for allowing me to tell real stories about their lives. I love all of the producers, writers, directors, and crew who took the series into their hearts and participated in SON as more than a 'job'. I love the cast and how they dimensionalized the characters and created real people that you as fans could relate to and feel for as they reflected your own lives. I especially love Spashley, The name you gave to the two lead characters. To be able to create a show called 'Excellent,' 'groundbreaking' and 'impossible to resist' is rare. To create a show that touches the hearts and lives of a generation is a gift. Thank you for allowing me and Spashley into your hearts. And remember, things change, so there's no telling where the stories of Spashley will show up next.
Love and Respect-Tom Lynch Creator / Executive Producer

=== Broadcast ===
Rather than cut the season in half, The N gave South of Nowhere a four-week break. The show returned to Noggin's nighttime lineup in January 2006 with the remaining episodes from the original order to air. During the breaks between episodes, interviews were shown with two of the stars, Gabrielle Christian and Matt Cohen, during commercial breaks.

The second season was originally set to begin on October 6, 2006, but was pushed up to September 29, 2006. Its season premiere followed the sixth-season premiere of Degrassi: The Next Generation. The N officially renewed South of Nowhere for a third season of 16 episodes in 2007. Eight episodes aired from August 10, 2007 to September 21, 2007.

Promotions began airing in March 2008 stating the show would be returning April 11. However, on March 21, it was announced that the final half of the third season had been pushed back to the fall. South of Nowhere returned for the remainder of its third season on October 10, 2008 and ended its run on December 12, 2008.

=== Music ===
- In the broadcast version of season one, the theme song was "I Don't Wanna Know (If You Don't Want Me)" by The Donnas.
- The show's theme song for the second and third seasons is "Wasted" by LP.
- For the Amazon DVD and iTunes releases, the first season's theme music was replaced with "Lift Me Up" by Gena Olivier.
- The song used in the teaser trailers for season one was "No Money Fun" by Oly.
- "Reasons to Fall" by Lauren Hoffman is used multiple times in "The Morning After". Another song by Hoffman, "Ghost You Know", was used during the ending scene of the season one finale. Her songs "Broken", "Hope You Don't Mind" and "Magic Stick" are also used throughout the series.
- The song used in early promos for season one is "Perfect Vision" by Montag.
- The song used in the first promo for season three is "Deep" by Ben Broussard.
- The song used in the promo for the last half of the series is "Goodbye" by Secondhand Serenade.
- The song used in the episode "Girls Guide To Dating" (also titled "Girls Guide To Dating Girls") is "Something In Me" by Katelyn Tarver.
- The song used in "Behind The Music" is "What I Wouldn't Give" by Skylar Grey.
- The song used twice ("Saturday Night Is For Fighting" and "The It Girls") is "Hollywood" by Conex.

== Release ==
=== Syndication ===
In Canada, reruns aired on MuchMusic from 2011 to 2012. In the United States, reruns aired on TeenNick from 2009 to 2010 and again in 2012, and on Logo TV in 2017.

=== DVD releases ===
From 2008 to 2009, all three seasons of South of Nowhere were released on DVD through Amazon CreateSpace.

=== Streaming ===
South of Nowhere is available to download online on the "TV Shows" section of Apple's U.S. iTunes Store and the episodes are formatted for use with the Apple iPod. The show is also available for download on Amazon Unbox service and viewable on a compatible PC, TV, or portable video player. On all of these copies, the first-season episodes have had the opening and closing theme music replaced with different music (noted above).

All episodes, as well as the webisodes, were able to be streamed on The N's video service "The Click". However, this service is only available in selected countries. It is not available in Canada. Episodes can also be viewed on Logo's official website.

Season 2 was released on September 16, 2008, through Amazon.com. Season 1 was released on October 21, 2008. These contain the same edits as used on Amazon Unbox. Season 1 does not feature opening credits for the majority of the episodes, though the accompanying music track, "Life Me Up," is used in the closing credits for each. Season 3 was released on June 16, 2009 through Amazon.

== Reception ==
=== Critical ===
South of Nowhere received positive reviews from television critics. Jill Murphy of Common Sense Media gave the series a four out of five stars stating "An eye-opening portrayal; OK for mature teens.".

=== Ratings ===
Ratings for the second season were up by 35% from season 1. On November 17, 2006, the series reached a high among teens with a 2.16 rating.

=== Awards and nominations ===
The series was nominated for a GLAAD Media Award for Outstanding Drama Series in 2006, 2007 and 2009.
