= AskMen =

Website portal

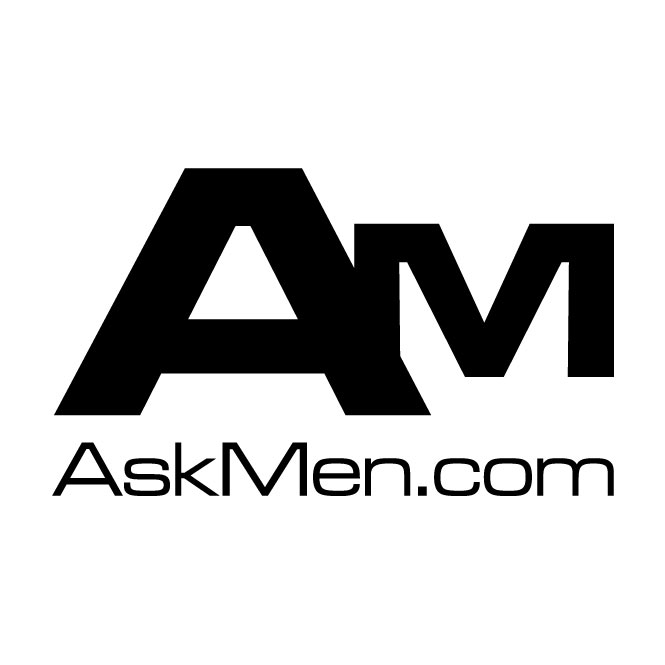
- Website type: Online men's publication
- Owner: Ziff Davis
- Website: www.askmen.com
- Commercial: Yes
- Registration: Optional
- Launched: January 2000; 26 years ago

AskMen is a free online men's web portal, with international versions in Australia, Canada, the Middle East, the United Kingdom and the United States. The site was acquired through IGN Entertainment in 2005 and is currently owned by Ziff Davis, which operates IGN as a subsidiary.

== History ==
AskMen was founded in August 1999 by Ricardo Poupada, Christopher Bellerose Rovny and Luís Rodrigues (all three graduates of Concordia University's John Molson School of Business in Montreal, Canada). The company secured $500,000 in venture capital in 2000 while its main competitor, TheMan.com, obtained $17 million in financing from Highland Capital. In November 2000, TheMan.com shut down operations, providing an opportunity for AskMen to become the largest men's lifestyle website online. By 2001, AskMen surpassed the other websites in its category to become the largest men's lifestyle website. In 2005, it was acquired by IGN.

In December 2009, the site had an estimated 12 million unique visitors.

== Print ==
In May 2007 AskMen launched a three-book series published by HarperCollins, starting with a book titled From the Bar to the Bedroom.
