= Maeve Quinlan =

American actress and tennis player (born 1964)

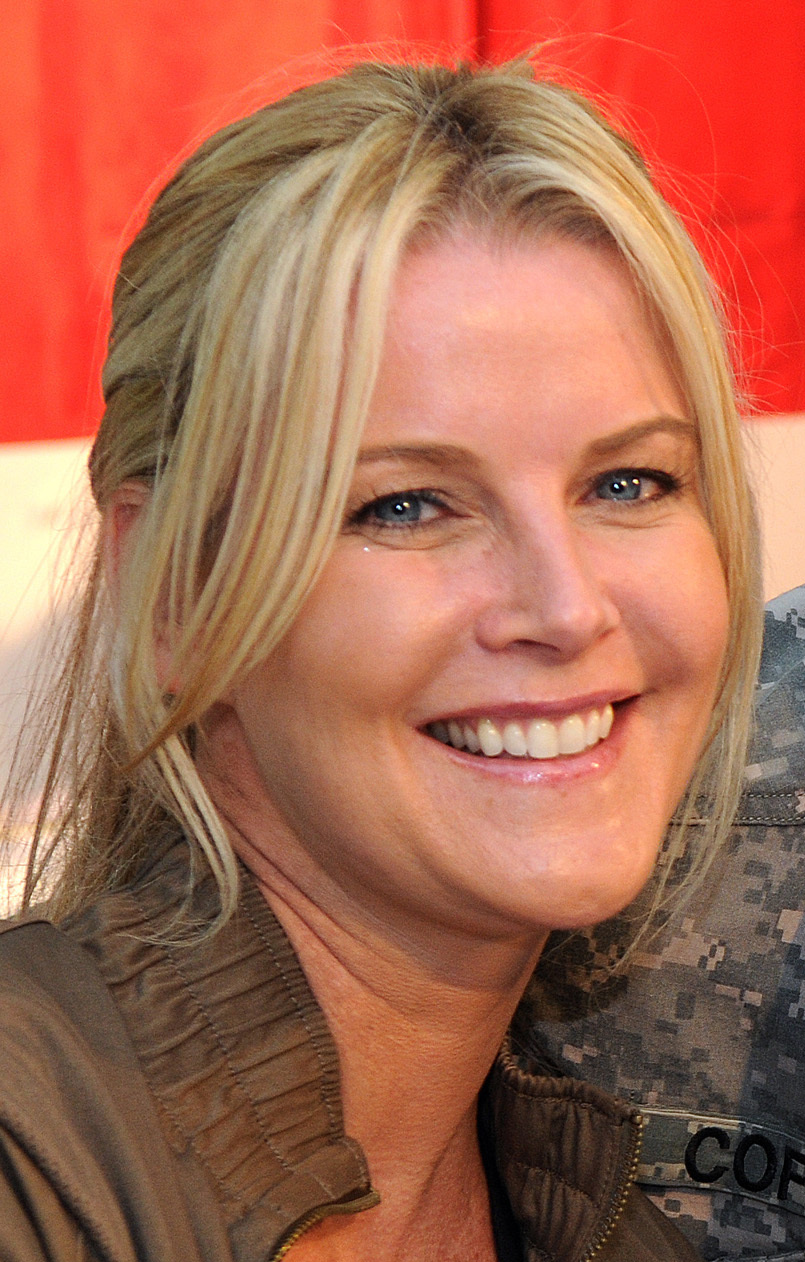
- Quinlan at Camp As Sayliyah, Qatar, in 2009
- Born: Maeve Anne Quinlan; November 16, 1964 (age 61); Chicago, Illinois, U.S.
- Citizenship: United States; Ireland
- Education: Northwestern University; University of Southern California (MFA)
- Occupation: Actress
- Years active: 1988-present
- Spouses: Tom Sizemore (m. 1996; div. 1999) Derek Chatterton (m. 2023)

Maeve Quinlan (born November 16, 1964) is an American-born Irish actress and retired tennis player. She is best known for starring as Megan Conley for 11 years in The Bold and the Beautiful, as Paula Carlin South of Nowhere, and Constance Tate-Duncan in the rebooted 90210.

== Career ==
Quinlan entered the professional tennis circuit at age 16. She competed in the French Open, Wimbledon and U.S. Open. Quinlan earned her full scholarship to both USC and Northwestern University, where she studied theater. After an injury, she quit tennis and pursued an acting career, starting with parts in commercials for Nike and Gatorade.

Prior to South of Nowhere, she was a regular on the soap opera The Bold and the Beautiful, where from 1995 to 2005 she played Megan Conley. She returned for a three-week guest-starring role on the show in March 2006, while on hiatus from South of Nowhere. One of her more notable roles was that of Rhonda in the 2002 movie Ken Park, a controversial film in which she received oral sex from the boyfriend of her character's daughter. She also starred in the unsuccessful comedy Totally Blonde in 2001, and in 2007, the popular web series Girltrash!

She starred in the 2009 movie Not Easily Broken with Morris Chestnut and Taraji P. Henson. She co-created, co-produced, and starred in 3 Way, a web series about roommates, which featured lesbian characters, with Jill Bennett, Maile Flanagan, and Cathy Shim.

== Personal life ==
Quinlan is a second-generation Irish American, the daughter of Irish immigrants, and holds dual US/Irish citizenship. She was married to actor Tom Sizemore from 1996 until their divorce in 1999. She is the ex-sister-in-law of Paul Sizemore and Aaron Sizemore.

== Filmography ==
=== Film ===
Year	Title	Role	Notes
1999	The Florentine	Claire	
1999	Play It to the Bone	Tiffany	
2001	Instinct to Kill	Receiving Nurse	
2001	Totally Blonde	Liv Watson	
2002	Ken Park	Rhonda	
2002	Heart of America	Becky Schultz	
2003	Net Games	Det. Sandra Simmonds	
2004	Nobody's Perfect	Crazy Girl	Short film
2004	Criminal	Heather	
2004	The Drone Virus	Colleen O'Brian	
2005	Tennis, Anyone...?	Siobhan Kelly	
2005	The Nickel Children	The Mother	
2006	High Hopes	Sarah	
2009	Not Easily Broken	Julie Sawyer	
2010	Dirty Girl	Janet	
2011	Sound of My Voice	Diane Winston	
2011	Cougars Inc.	Kitty Lowell	
2012	Divorce Invitation	Pam	credited as Rose Dublin
2013	Another Dirty Movie	Mrs. Prussy	
2016	Liquorice	Mariam Glass	
2022	Our Almost Completely True Story	Heather	

=== Television ===
Year	Title	Role	Notes
1995-2006	The Bold and the Beautiful	Megan Conley	Regular role (330 episodes)
1997	L.A. Heat	Teresa	Episode: "Old Scores"
2001	JAG	Susan Evans	Episode: "New Gun in Town"
2004	A Boyfriend for Christmas	Diane	TV film
2005	McBride: The Chameleon Murder	Whitney Collier	TV film
2005-2008	South of Nowhere	Paula Carlin	Main role (41 episodes)
2006	South Beach	Jennifer	Episode: "I'll Do What I Want to Do"
2007	Dirt	Kitty Ryder	Episode: "The Sexxx Issue"
2007	Primal Doubt	Holly	TV film
2008	Life	Lynn Gray	Episodes: "Not for Nothing", "Crushed"
2008-2011	90210	Constance Tate-Duncan	Recurring role (8 episodes)
2012	Hawaii Five-0	Sandra Fryer	Episode: "Ua Hala"
2012	Teenage Bank Heist	Joyce	TV film
2015	Double Daddy	Diane	TV film
2015	A Christmas Miracle	Eva Jones	TV film
2017	The Stalker Club	Karen	TV film
2017-2018	Riley Parra	Nina Hathaway	Recurring role (5 episodes)
2018	The Sinister Surrogate	Carol Morrison	TV film
2019	Riley Parra: Better Angels	Nina Hathaway	TV film
2022	A Job to Die For	Claudia	TV film
2023	The Paramedic Who Stalked Me	Karen	TV film

=== Web ===
Year	Title	Role	Notes
2007	Girltrash!	Judge Cragen	2 episodes
2008–2009	3 Way	Siobhan McGarry	13 episodes
2013	Cowgirl Up	Buckshot Betty	Recurring role (6 episodes)
