= Angela Robinson (filmmaker) =

American director and screenwriter

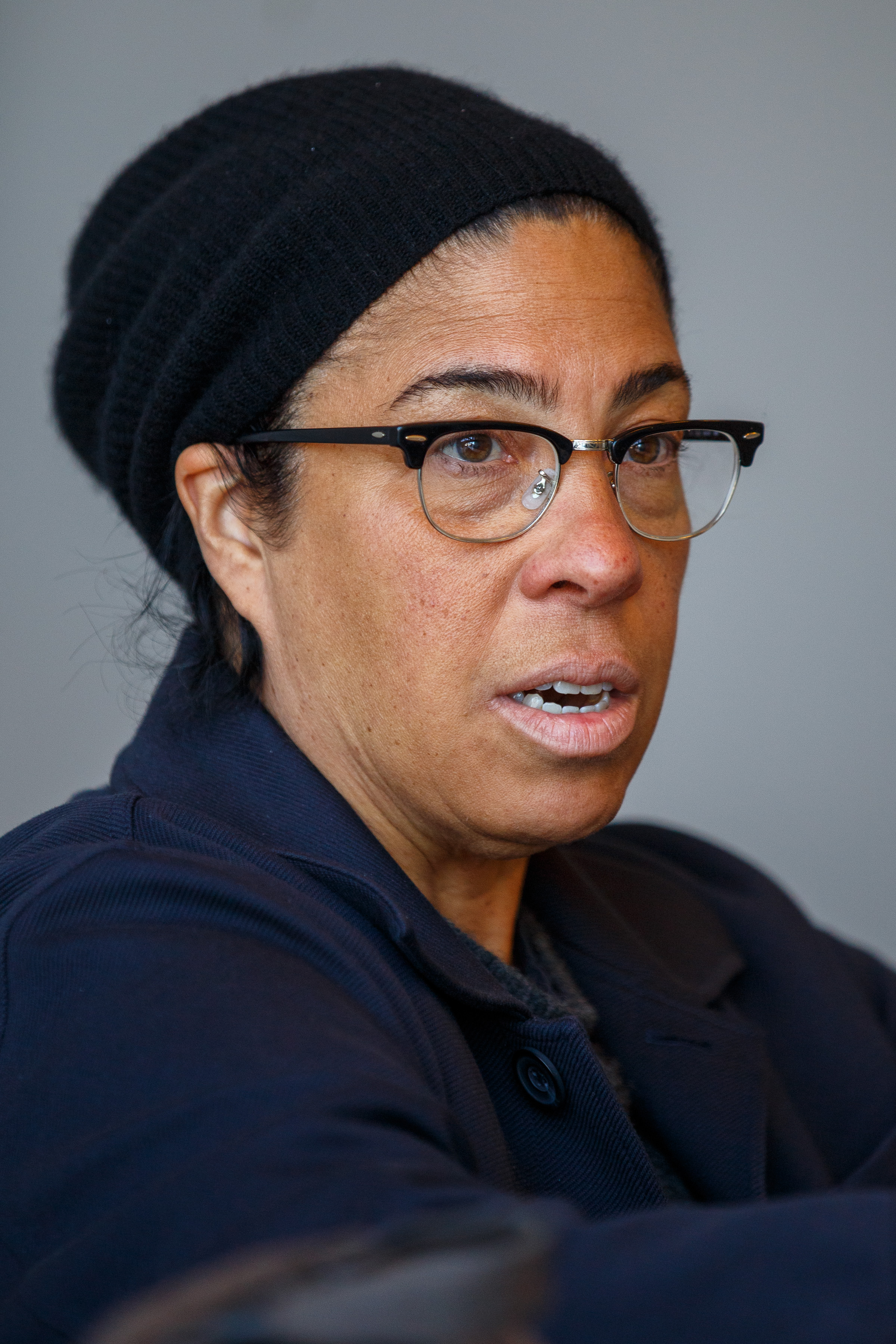
- Robinson in 2025
- Born: February 14, 1971 (age 55); Chicago, Illinois, U.S.
- Education: Brown University (B.A.); New York University (MFA)
- Occupations: Director, screenwriter, producer
- Years active: 1995–present
- Partner: Alexandra "Alex" Martinez Kondracke
- Children: 1

Angela Robinson (born February 14, 1971) is an American film and television director, screenwriter and producer. Outfest Fusion LGBTQ People of Color Film Festival awarded Robinson with the Fusion Achievement Award in 2013 for her contribution to LGBTQ+ media visibility.

== Early life ==
Robinson was born in Chicago. Robinson attended Brown University, where she majored in theatre and later received an MFA from New York University.

== Career ==
Robinson frequently deals with gay and lesbian topics in her films. Angela Robinson's first screen work was a black and white film, Chickula: Teenage Vampire, about a queer vampire. The film was shown at LGBTQ film festivals in 1995.

== Films ==
=== D.E.B.S. ===
Robinson directed the short film D.E.B.S. (2003), produced by POWER UP. The short film has won four awards which includes the Bearfest-Big Bear Lake International Film Festival Jury Award for Best Short Film, the PlanetOut Short Movie Awards Grand Prize, the Philadelphia International Gay & Lesbian Film Festival Jury Prize for Best Lesbian Short Film and New York Lesbian and Gay Film Festival Award for Best Short. Robinson went on to direct a feature-length adaptation of D.E.B.S. (2004). D.E.B.S (2004) is a lesbian romantic comedy about a "spy-in training Amy Bradshaw and a supervillian Lucy Diamond. Amy is assigned to go after Lucy. However, Amy starts to develop feelings for her." D.E.B.S has made a big impact in queer cinema. Senior entertainment writer named Adam Vary described D.E.B.S as "the gay spy movie" in his article "The New New Queer Cinema". Writer Katrin Horn remarked that D.E.B.S is a groundbreaking movie as the film works to desexualize femme identity previously centered in lesbian chic cinema. Robinson's use of narrative and stylistic techniques in D.E.B.S offered a new lenses into lesbian representations and the structure of heteronormative romantic comedies.

=== Girltrash! ===
In 2007, Robinson created the online series Girltrash! for OurChart, a social networking website aimed primarily at lesbians. In 2014, Robinson wrote the screenplay for a musical feature film and prequel to her Girltrash! series, Girltrash: All Night Long, directed by Alexandra Kondracke. Robinson was also one of the producers for the film. The film is a lesbian musical drama about two rock and roll musicians named Daisy and Tyler during a night out in the LGBTQ+ subculture of Los Angeles. The film won the audience award in the 2015 Paris International Lesbian and Feminist Film Festival.

=== Professor Marston and the Wonder Women ===
Robinson wrote and directed the film Professor Marston and the Wonder Women that was released in 2017. The film focuses on William Moulton Marston, a Harvard educated psychologist who created Wonder Woman in the 1940s. Marston's received help from his wife Elizabeth and Olive Byrne, a research assistant, in his creation of the super heroine. The movie also includes the polyamorous relationship Marston, Elizabeth and Olive were in and how that effected their careers and lives.

The film's inclusion of a lesbian relationship between Elizabeth Marston and Olive Byrne after William's death was criticized and strongly denounced by Christie Marston, daughter of William’s son Moulton, saying she was "blindsided" by the narrative since nobody from the film ever reached out to her or her family. For her part, Robinson admitted in an interview with Abraham Riesman at Vulture that she made no effort to contact the family. She admitted that the entire story line was fictional, stating: "I wanted to kind of be able to explore my own interpretation of what the story was…. I felt like their story had been kind of hidden from history for a long time, and I kind of wanted to excavate and interpret what I found and then write the film."

=== Strangers in Paradise ===
In 2017, Robinson worked with cartoonist Terry Moore on a feature film adaptation of graphic novel Strangers in Paradise.

== Television ==
=== The L Word ===
In 2004, Robinson wrote, produced and directed episodes from the show The L Word. The show is about the lives of a group of lesbian and bisexual friends in Los Angeles. Media critic, Samuel A. Chambers argues that the L Word's importance is that the show brought a lot of visibility to a range of lesbian and bisexual identities in its character plot lines. Also, many of the guests cast on the show were queer actresses in Hollywood, like Jane Lynch and Sandra Bernhard. In 2006, the show won the 17th annual GLAAD Media award. The award recognizes and honors inclusive representations of LGBTQ+ people and issues that impact them.

=== True Blood ===
Robinson has served as a writer for the television series True Blood. True Blood is an American fantasy drama about Sookie Stackhouse, a telepathic waitress, who lives in a rural town in Louisiana. The waitress falls in love with Bill Compton, a vampire, and the two must navigate the challenges that come with their relationship. The fictional show also focuses on vampires' struggle for rights and assimilation in society.

=== Other works ===
Robinson has also served as writer and co-executive producer for the HBO television series Hung, In addition to her film and TV work, Robinson also wrote the first four issues of the Web ongoing series at DC Comics.

In March 2012, it was announced that Robinson would write a supernatural teen thriller with Dawn Olmstead (of Prison Break) and Marti Noxon (of Mad Men) attached as producers.

More recently, in 2021, Robinson signed an overall deal with Warner Bros. Television to create scripted television programs for Warner Bros. platforms including Max, basic and premium cable channels and broadcast networks.

At Warner Bros., Robinson is currently working as writer and executive producer with HBO Max to develop a series based on Madame X, a DC Comics character also known as Madame Xanadu. Madame X is a clairvoyant who uses tarot cards to tell the future and is immortal due to her deal with Death. The series will be produced by Bad Robot in association with Warner Bros. Television.

== Personal life ==
Robinson is openly lesbian. She met her partner, television writer and director Alexandra "Alex" Martinez Kondracke, the daughter of Morton Kondracke, while they were both studying at New York University. Kondracke is an activist and filmmaker. In 2009, Kondracke gave birth to their first child, Diego. They live in the Los Feliz neighborhood of Los Angeles.

== Filmography ==
=== Film ===
Short film

Year	Title	Director	Writer	Producer	Editor	Notes
1995	Chickula: Teenage Vampire	Yes	Yes	No	No	1995 N.Y.U. application film
1998	The Kinsey 3	Yes	No	No	Yes	
1999	Ice Fishing	No	No	Yes	No	
2003	D.E.B.S.	Yes	Yes	No	Yes	
2007	Girltrash!	Yes	Yes	No	No	Web series

Feature film

Year	Title	Director	Writer	Producer	Notes
2004	D.E.B.S.	Yes	Yes	No	Also editor
2005	Herbie: Fully Loaded	Yes	No	No	
2014	Girltrash: All Night Long	No	Yes	Yes	
2017	Professor Marston and the Wonder Women	Yes	Yes	No	

As herself

- Fabulous!: The Story of Queer Cinema (2006)

=== Television ===
Year	Title	Director	Writer	Producer	Notes
1999–2001	Taxicab Confessions	No	No	Yes	3 episodes
2004–2009	The L Word	Yes	Yes	Yes	Directed 8 episodes, wrote 6 episodes; Role: Angela (episode: "LMFAO")
2007–2009	Girltrash!	Yes	Yes	Executive	Web series; Also editor
2009–2011	Hung	No	Yes	Yes	Wrote 4 episodes
2010	Gigantic	Yes	No	No	2 episodes
2011	Charlie's Angels	Yes	No	No	Episode "Runaway Angels"
2012–2014	True Blood	Yes	Yes	Yes	Wrote 6 episodes, directed 1
2015–2017	How to Get Away with Murder	No	Yes	Yes	Wrote 2 episodes
2025	Wednesday	Yes	No	No	2 episodes

== Awards and nominations ==
Year	Title	Award/Nomination
2003	D.E.B.S.	Bearfest - Big Bear Lake International Film Festival Jury Award for Best Short Film * New York Lesbian and Gay Film Festival Award for Best Short * Philadelphia International Gay & Lesbian Film Festival Jury Prize for Best Lesbian Short Film * PlanetOut Short Movie Awards Grand Prize
2004	D.E.B.S.	Nominated: 2005 Black Movie Awards for Outstanding Achievement in Writing

== See also ==
- List of female film and television directors
- List of lesbian filmmakers
- List of LGBT-related films directed by women
