= List of Guggenheim Fellowships awarded in 2002 =

List of Guggenheim Fellowships awarded in 2002.

== U.S. and Canadian Fellows ==
- Andrew Abbott, Gustavus F. and Ann M. Swift Distinguished Service Professor, University of Chicago: Time and social structure.
- Peter A. Abrams, Professor of Zoology, University of Toronto: Sources of uncertainty in ecological predictions.
- Betty Adcock, poet, Raleigh, North Carolina; Member of the MFA Faculty in Writing, Warren Wilson College MFA Program for Writers; Writer-in-Residence, Meredith College: Poetry.
- Rabih Alameddine, writer, San Francisco: Fiction.
- Robert Livingston Aldridge, composer, Clifton, New Jersey; Assistant Professor of Music, Montclair State University: Music composition.
- Elizabeth Alexander, poet, New Haven, Connecticut; Adjunct Associate Professor of African-American Studies, Yale University: Poetry.
- Philip B. Allen, Professor of Physics and Astronomy, State University of New York at Stony Brook: Electron-phonon effects in nanosystems.
- Thomas T. Allsen, Professor of History, College of New Jersey: The royal hunt in Eurasian history.
- Stephen Alter, writer, Reading, Massachusetts; Writer-in-Residence, Massachusetts Institute of Technology: A biography of the Indian elephant.
- Donald Antrim, writer, Brooklyn, New York: Fiction.
- Brett Baker, artist, Ithaca, New York: Painting.
- Rebecca Baron, film maker, Los Angeles; Member of the Faculty in Film, California Institute of the Arts: Film making.
- Lawrence W. Barsalou, Professor of Psychology, Emory University: The human conceptual system.
- Omer Bartov, John P. Birkelund Distinguished Professor of European History, professor of history, and Professor of German Studies, Brown University: The origins of the Holocaust in Buczacz, Ukraine.
- Ellen B. Basso, Professor of Anthropology, University of Arizona: A translation of Kalapalo narratives.
- Louise Beach, composer, Pleasantville, New York: Music composition.
- Marion Belanger, photographer, Guilford, Connecticut: Photography.
- David A. Bell, Professor of History, Johns Hopkins University: The culture of war in the age of Napoleon.
- Paul Berman, writer, Brooklyn, New York: A study of pro-Americanism and anti-Americanism.
- George F. Bertsch, Professor of Physics, University of Washington, Seattle: The density functional theory of nuclear binding.
- Alan Bewell, Professor of English, University of Toronto: Romanticism and natural history.
- Dawoud Bey, photographer, Chicago. Professor of Photography, Columbia College Chicago: Photography.
- Stanley Boorman, Professor of Music, New York University: Music printing and publishing in Italy, 1501–1539.
- Philip Brett, Professor of Musicology, University of California, Los Angeles: The music and life of Benjamin Britten.
- Nicholas Brooke, composer, Kingston, New Jersey: Music composition.
- Diane Coburn Bruning, choreographer, Sleepy Hollow, New York; artistic director, Chamber Dance Project: Choreography.
- Mary Baine Campbell, Professor of English and American Literature, Brandeis University: Dream and metaphor in early modern literature, science, and personal life.
- Christopher Cannon, University Lecturer and Fellow, Faculty of English and Pembroke College, University of Cambridge: Form as thought in early Middle English literature.
- Bridget Carpenter, playwright, Los Angeles: Play writing.
- Noël Carroll, Monroe C. Beardsley Professor of the Philosophy of Art, University of Wisconsin–Madison: The philosophy of dance.
- Elinor Carucci, photographer, New York City; Member of the Faculty in Photography, School of Visual Arts: Photography.
- Rita Charon, Professor of Clinical Medicine and Director, Program in Narrative Medicine, College of Physicians and Surgeons, Columbia University: Narrative medicine as a model for empathy and clinical courage.
- Brian R. Cheffins, S. J. Berwin Professor of Corporate Law, University of Cambridge: The foundations of the Anglo-American corporate economy.
- Gang Chen, Associate Professor of Mechanical Engineering, Massachusetts Institute of Technology: Functional nanomechanical structures and devices.
- John R. Clarke, Annie Laurie Howard Regents Professor, University of Texas at Austin: Humor, power, and transgression in ancient Roman visual culture.
- Peter Cole, poet and translator, Jerusalem; Visiting Artist and Scholar, Jewish Studies Program, Wesleyan University: A translation of Hebrew poetry of Spain.
- Dennis Congdon, artist, Rehoboth, Massachusetts; Professor of Painting, Rhode Island School of Design: Painting.
- Anthony Cutler, Research Professor of Art History, Pennsylvania State University: Gifts and gift exchange between Byzantium, the Islamic world, and beyond.
- Lennard J. Davis, Professor of English, Professor of Disability and Human Development, University of Illinois at Chicago: A history of obsession in Western culture.
- Sam Davis, Professor of Architecture and Associate Dean, College of Environmental Design, University of California, Berkeley: Architecture for the homeless in America.
- John Dorst, Professor of American Studies, University of Wyoming: Animal trophies and taxidermy displays in contemporary American culture.
- Dennis Eberhard, Composer, Cleveland, Ohio; Director of Transitional Education Services, Services for Independent Living, Cleveland: Music composition.
- Judith Eisler, artist, New York City: Painting.
- Mitch Epstein, photographer, New York City; President, Black River Productions; Associate Professor of Photography, Bard College: Photography.
- Rodney C. Ewing, Professor of Nuclear Engineering and Radiological Sciences, Geological Sciences, and Materials Science and Engineering, University of Michigan: The impact of the nuclear fuel cycle on the environment.
- Ann Fabian, Associate Professor of American Studies and History, Rutgers University: The collection and display of human remains in 19th-century United States.
- Anne Feldhaus, Professor of Religious Studies, Arizona State University: Divine siblings in India.
- Robin Fleming, Professor of History, Boston College: Material culture and the rewriting of Anglo-Saxon history.
- Robert Fourer, Professor of Industrial Engineering and Management Sciences, Northwestern University: Languages and systems for large-scale optimization.
- William L. Fox, independent scholar, Portland, Oregon: The perception of space in Antarctica.
- Daniel S. Freed, Professor of Mathematics, University of Texas at Austin: Applications of K-theory to geometry and physics.
- Takashi Fujitani, Associate Professor of History, University of California, San Diego: "Korean Japanese" and "Japanese Americans" during World War II.
- Michael Gagarin, James R. Dougherty Jr. Centennial Professor of Classics, University of Texas at Austin: Writing and orality in ancient Greek law.
- Mary Gaitskill, writer, Rhinebeck, New York; Instructor in English, Syracuse University: Fiction.
- Susan Gal, Professor of Anthropology and Linguistics, University of Chicago: Language ideologies and political authority during and after socialism.
- Thomas M. Gardner, Professor of English, Virginia Polytechnic Institute and State University: Emily Dickinson and contemporary writers.
- William Gay, writer, Hohenwald, Tennessee: Fiction.
- Diane Yvonne Ghirardo, Professor of the History and Theory of Architecture, University of Southern California and University of Cape Town: Women's spaces in Renaissance Ferrara.
- David D. Gilmore, Professor of Anthropology, State University of New York at Stony Brook: Monsters in rituals.
- Alfredo Gisholt, artist, Newton, Massachusetts; Teaching Associate of Art, Boston University: Painting.
- Susan Goodman, Professor of English, University of Delaware: A biography of William Dean Howells.
- Jeffrey L. Gould, Professor of History and Director, Center for Latin American and Caribbean Studies, Indiana University Bloomington: Rebellion, repression, and memory in El Salvador.
- David Greenspan, playwright, New York City: Play writing.
- Daniel Hall, poet, Amherst, Massachusetts; Visiting Writer, Amherst College: Poetry.
- Paul Harold Halpern, Professor of Mathematics and Physics, University of the Sciences in Philadelphia: The concept of dimensionality in science.
- Jonathan Hay, Associate Professor of Fine Arts, New York University: The erotics of luxury in Chinese art, 1580–1840.
- Perry Hoberman, artist, Brooklyn, New York; Member of the MFA Adjunct Faculty in Computer Art and Photography and Related Media, School of Visual Arts: New media art.
- Stephen D. Houston, Jesse Knight University Professor, Brigham Young University: Experience and being among the classic Maya.
- Nicholas Howe, Professor of English and Director, Center for Medieval and Renaissance Studies. Ohio State University: Cultural geography of Anglo-Saxon England.
- Martha C. Howell, Gustave Berne Professor of History, Columbia University: Market culture in cities of the late medieval North.
- John P. Huelsenbeck, Assistant Professor of Biology, University of Rochester: Studies in phylogenetic inference.
- David Humphrey, artist, New York City: Painting.
- Dan Hurlin, choreographer and theatre artist, New York City; Member of the Faculty in Dance and Theatre, Sarah Lawrence College: Choreography.
- Douglas Irwin, Professor of Economics, Dartmouth College: A history of United States trade policy.
- Kenro Izu, photographer, Rhinebeck, New York; President, Kenro Izu Studio: Photography.
- Richard Jackson, poet, Chattanooga, Tennessee; Professor of English, University of Tennessee, Chattanooga; Member of the Faculty, MFA Program in Writing, Vermont College: Poetry.
- Lea Jacobs, Professor of Communication Arts, University of Wisconsin–Madison: The decline of sentiment in American silent film.
- Iván A. Jaksic, Professor of History, University of Notre Dame: Ticknor, Prescott, and the origins of Hispanic studies in the United States.
- Deborah Jowitt, Senior Dance Critic, Village Voice; Master Teacher of Dance and Dance History, Tisch School of the Arts, New York University: A critical biography of Jerome Robbins.
- Mercouri G. Kanatzidis, Professor of Chemistry, Michigan State University: Studies in solid-state chemistry.
- Moisés Kaufman, playwright, New York City; artistic director, Tectonic Theatre Project: Play writing.
- Alexander S. Kechris, Professor of Mathematics, California Institute of Technology: Classification problems in mathematics, group actions, and equivalence relations.
- John Kelsay, Richard L. Rubenstein Professor of Religion, Florida State University: The Islamic law of war and peace.
- Stephen Kern, Distinguished Research Professor of History, Northern Illinois University: A cultural history of causality since 1830.
- Barbara J. King, Associate Professor of Anthropology and University Professor for Teaching Excellence, College of William and Mary: The social emergence of communication and language in primates.
- Elizabeth King, artist, Richmond, Virginia; School of the Arts Research Professor in Sculpture, Virginia Commonwealth University: Video Installation.
- Carol L. Krumhansl, Professor of Psychology, Cornell University: Cognitive neuroscience of music.
- Paul LaFarge, writer, Brooklyn, New York; Adjunct Professor of Writing, Columbia University; Visiting Writer, Wesleyan University: Fiction.
- Jhumpa Lahiri, writer, Brooklyn, New York: Fiction.
- Peter Lake, Professor of History, Princeton University: Dynastic crises, confessional politics, and conspiracy theory in post-Reformation England.
- Bun-Ching Lam, composer, Poestenkill, New York: Music composition.
- David W. Lea, Professor of Geological Sciences, University of California, Santa Barbara: The role of tropical ocean cooling and atmospheric carbon-dioxide variations in ice-age cycles.
- Marsha I. Lester, Professor of Chemistry, University of Pennsylvania: Significant radical reactions in the lower atmosphere.
- Arthur Levering, II, composer, Cambridge, Massachusetts: Music composition.
- Margaret Levi, Jere L. Bacharach Professor of International Studies and Professor of Political Science, University of Washington, Seattle: Trustworthy governance and constituent engagement.
- Laura A. Lewis, Associate Professor of Anthropology, James Madison University: Narratives of history, race, and place in the making of black Mexico.
- Xinsheng Sean Ling, Professor of Physics, Brown University: Studies in nanopore DNA sequencing.
- Kefeng Liu, Associate Professor of Mathematics, University of California, Los Angeles: Mathematical and physical aspects of the mirror principle.
- Rosemary Helen Lloyd, Rudy Professor of French, Indiana University Bloomington: The still life in art and letters.
- Andrew W. Lo, Harris & Harris Group Professor and Director, MIT Laboratory for Financial Engineering, Massachusetts Institute of Technology: A cognitive map of financial risk perception and preferences.
- Victor Lodato, playwright, Tucson, Arizona: Play writing.
- Abraham Loeb, Professor of Astronomy, Harvard University: Studies of the earliest stars and black holes.
- Jerome Loving, Professor of English, Texas A&M University: A biography of Theodore Dreiser.
- Michael Lucey, Associate Professor of French and Comparative Literature and Director, Center for the Study of Sexual Culture, University of California, Berkeley: Same-sex sexualities in 20th-century French literature.
- David Ludden, Professor of History, University of Pennsylvania: A history of knowledge about South Asian economies, 1770–1930.
- Philip Lutgendorf, Associate Professor of Hindi and Modern Indian Studies, University of Iowa: The meanings of the divine monkey in India.
- John D. Lyons, Commonwealth Professor of French, University of Virginia: The practice of imagination in early modern France.
- Mikhail Lyubich, Professor of Mathematics and deputy director, Institute for Mathematical Sciences, State University of New York at Stony Brook: Geometric structures in holomorphic dynamics.
- Kristin Mann, Associate Professor of History, Emory University: Trade, state, and emancipation in 19th-century Lagos.
- Lev Manovich, Associate Professor of New Media Art, University of California, San Diego: The avant-garde art of the early 20th century and new media culture.
- Tanya Marcuse, photographer, Barrytown, New York; Adjunct Professor of Photography, Simon's Rock College of Bard and Bard College: Photography.
- Robert L. Martensen, Professor of History of Medicine and Director, Clendending Library of History of Medicine, University of Kansas School of Medicine: The origins and cultural politics of the cerebral body.
- Chris Martin, artist, Brooklyn, New York; Art Therapist, Rivington House Health Care Facility, New York: Painting.
- Rita McBride, artist, New York City: Sculpture.
- Marlene McCarty, installation artist, New York City: Installation art.
- Jim McKay, film maker, New York City: Film making.
- Jane Mead, poet, Winston-Salem, North Carolina; Poet-in-Residence, Wake Forest University: Poetry.
- Ian A. Meinertzhagen, Killam Professor in Neuroscience, Dalhousie University: Post-genomic approaches to simple nervous systems.
- Claire Messud, Writer, Northampton, Massachusetts; Visiting Writer, Amherst College: Fiction.
- Guy P. R. Métraux, Professor of Visual Arts, York University: Christian destruction of ancient art.
- Susan Mogul, video and film maker, Los Angeles: Video and film making.
- Santi Moix, artist, New York City: Painting.
- Ian Morris, Jean and Rebecca Willard Professor of Classics and professor of history, Stanford University: Greek democracy and standards of living in the first millennium BCE.
- Judith Murray, artist, New York City: Painting.
- John Nathan, Takashima Professor of Japanese Cultural Studies, University of California, Santa Barbara: Japan's quest for a viable role today.
- Stephen Neale, Professor of Philosophy, Rutgers University: Myths of meaning.
- Bruce Nelson, Professor of History, Dartmouth College: "Race" and "nation" in Ireland and the Irish diaspora.
- Eric Nisenson, writer, Malden, Massachusetts: The Brazilian musical and cultural revolution.
- Jennifer Nuss, artist, New York City; Artist-in-Residence, Brandeis University: Painting.
- Lena Cowen Orlin, Professor of English, University of Maryland, Baltimore County; executive director, Shakespeare Association of America: Privacy in early modern England.
- Kathy Peiss, Professor of History, University of Pennsylvania: Taste and the myth of American classlessness.
- H. Vincent Poor, Professor of Electrical Engineering, Princeton University: Quantum multi-user communications.
- René Prieto, Professor of Spanish, Vanderbilt University: The theme of solitude in Spanish American literature.
- Stephen Prina, artist, Los Angeles; Instructor in Fine Art, Art Center College of Design: Visual art.
- Pola Rapaport, film maker, Hampton Bays, New York: Film making.
- Dewey Redman, composer, Brooklyn, New York: Music composition.
- Donald Reid, Professor of History, University of North Carolina at Chapel Hill: A biography of Daniel Guérin.
- Howard Rosenthal, Roger Williams Straus Professor of Social Sciences and Professor of Politics, Princeton University: Empirical tests of theories of the legislative process.
- Jonathan L. Rosner, Professor of Physics, Enrico Fermi Institute, University of Chicago: Studies in heavy quark physics.
- Alexander Ross, artist, Alford, Massachusetts: Painting.
- Mary Ruefle, poet, Amherst, Massachusetts; Visiting associate professor of English, University of Alabama: Poetry.
- Russell Rymer, writer, Portland, Oregon: The pernambuco tree, conservation, and classical music.
- Richard A. Satterlie, Professor of Biology, Arizona State University: The modular and multifunctional nature of arousal systems.
- Adrian Saxe, Artist, Los Angeles; Professor of Art, University of California, Los Angeles: Sculpture.
- Ilya R. Segal, Associate Professor of Economics, Stanford University: Prior knowledge and communication constraints in the design of multi-unit auctions.
- Ullica Segerstråle, Professor of Sociology, Illinois Institute of Technology: An intellectual biography of the evolutionist William D. Hamilton.
- Ruth G. Shaw, Professor of Ecology, Evolution and Behavior, University of Minnesota: Evolutionary consequences of fragmentation.
- Charlie Smith, writer, New York City: Poetry.
- Sheila M. Sofian, film animator, Pasadena, California; Assistant Professor of Film Animation, College of the Canyons: Film animation.
- Pierre Sokolsky, Professor of Physics, University of Utah: Ultrahigh-energy cosmic rays on the ground and in space.
- David Stark, Arnold A. Saltzman Professor of Sociology & International Affairs, Columbia University: Network properties of East European capitalism.
- Allyson Strafella, artist, Brooklyn, New York: Drawing.
- Elisabeth Subrin, film maker, Brooklyn, New York; Visiting Lecturer of Film Studies, Amherst College: Film making.
- Lawrence R. Sulak, David M. Myers Distinguished Professor of Physics, Boston University: The observation of high-energy neutrinos.
- Madoka Takagi, photographer, Topanga, California: Photography.
- Gary Taylor, Professor of English and Director, Hudson Strode Program in Renaissance Studies, University of Alabama: The publishing career of Edward Blount.
- Richard Taylor, Professor of Mathematics, Harvard University: Galois representations and modular forms.
- Richard Lowe Teitelbaum, composer, Bearsville, New York; Professor of Music, Milton Avery Graduate School of the Arts, Bard College: Music composition.
- Elizabeth A. Thompson, Professor of Statistics and Biostatistics and adjunct professor of genetics, University of Washington, Seattle: Studies in statistical genetics.
- Daniel Treisman, Associate Professor of Political Science, University of California, Los Angeles: Decentralization, governance, and economic performance.
- Matthew Turner, Associate Professor of Geography, University of Wisconsin–Madison: The history of environmental scientific practice in the Sahel.
- Naomi Uman, film maker, Newhall, California; Member of the Adjunct Faculty, California Institute of the Arts: Film making.
- Tomas Vu-Daniel, Artist, New York City; Assistant Professor of Art, Columbia University: Painting.
- Howard Waitzkin, Professor of Family and Community Medicine, Internal Medicine, and Sociology, University of New Mexico: Economic globalization and public health.
- Craig Walsh (Craig T. Walsh), composer, Tucson, Arizona; Associate Professor Emeritus of Music, University of Arizona: Music composition.
- Lee Palmer Wandel, Professor of History and Religious Studies, University of Wisconsin–Madison: The Eucharist in the early modern world.
- Robert N. Watson, Professor of English, University of California, Los Angeles: Human alienation from nature in the English Renaissance.
- Sheldon Weinbaum, CUNY Distinguished Professor of Mechanical and Biomedical Engineering, City College of New York: The structure and function of the endothelial glycocalyx.
- Jonathan Weinberg, independent scholar and artist, Jersey City: Art and identity in the East Village.
- Catherine Weis, choreographer, New York City; artistic director, Cathy Weis Projects; President and co-director, Roxanne Dance Foundation: Choreography.
- Claire Grace Williams, Professor of Genetics and Forestry, Texas A&M University: Ecological, evolutionary, and population genomics of conifers.
- Reggie Wilson, choreographer, Brooklyn, New York; artistic director, Reggie Wilson/Fist and Heel Performance Group: Choreography.
- Alison Winter, Associate Professor of History, University of Chicago: Technologies of truth and sciences of memory since 1890.
- Larry Wolff, Professor of History, Boston College: Legitimation and imagination in Habsburg Poland.
- Christopher S. Wood, Professor of History of Art, Yale University: Reproductive technologies and Renaissance art.
- James Woolley, Frank Lee and Edna M. Smith Professor of English, Lafayette College: The textual history of Jonathan Swift's poems.
- Randy Wray, artist, Brooklyn, New York: Painting and sculpture.
- Victoria Wulff, artist, New York City: Painting.
- Yu Xie, Frederick G. L. Huetwell Professor of Sociology and Statistics and Senior Research Scientist, Institute for Social Research, University of Michigan: Economic reform and social inequality in contemporary China.
- Karen Yasinsky, artist, Brooklyn, New York: Video.
- Charles F. Yocum, Alfred S. Sussman Collegiate Professor of Molecular, Cellular and Developmental Biology and Professor of Chemistry, University of Michigan: The role of calcium in photosynthetic oxygen production.
- Dean Young, Poet, Berkeley California; Visiting professor, Writers' Workshop, University of Iowa; Member of the MFA Faculty in Writing, Warren Wilson College: Poetry.
- Carl Zimmer, writer, Sunnyside, New York: The discovery of the brain and the birth of the neurocentric age.
- Karl Zimmerer, Professor of Geography and Director, Environment and Development Research Institute, University of Wisconsin–Madison: The rural-urban geography of conservation and resource management.

== Latin American and Caribbean Fellows ==
- Ana Victoria Arias Mantilla, video artist, Bogotá, Colombia: Video making.
- Eduardo M. Basualdo, independent researcher, National Research Council of Argentina (CONICET); Coordinator of Economics and Technology, Latin American Faculty of Social Sciences (FLACSO), Buenos Aires: The evolution, characteristics, and impact of Argentine external debt between 1970 and 2000.
- Mario Bellatin, writer, Mexico City: Fiction.
- José Bengoa, Professor of Anthropology, Universidad Academia de Humanismo Cristiano, Santiago, Chile: History of Mapuche society in the 16th and 17th centuries.
- Pablo Cabado, photographer, Buenos Aires: Photography.
- Jorge José Casal, Associate Professor of Agronomy, University of Buenos Aires; Research Scientist, National Research Council of Argentina (CONICET): Light signaling circuitry in Arabidopsis.
- Richard Cooke, staff scientist, Smithsonian Tropical Research Institute, Balboa, Panama: Life and death at a Precolumbian settlement in Panama.
- Alonso Cueto Caballero, writer, Lima, Peru: Fiction.
- Olívia Maria Gomes da Cunha, Associate Professor of Cultural Anthropology, Federal University of Rio de Janeiro: Ruth Landes in Brazil.
- Mauricio de Mello Dias, artist, Rio de Janeiro: Collaborative interdisciplinary public art (in collaboration with Walter Stephen Riedweg).
- Sandra M. Diaz, Independent Researcher, National Research Council of Argentina (CONICET); Associate Professor of Plant Biology, National University of Córdoba: Comparison of functional diversity and key traits in island and continental floras.
- George A. DosReis, Professor of Immunology, Federal University of Rio de Janeiro: Neutrophil clearance in defense against parasite infection.
- María Teresa Dova, Professor of Physics, National University of La Plata; Research Scientist, National Research Council of Argentina (CONICET): Cosmic rays and high energy experimental physics.
- Antonio Escobar Ohmstede, Research Professor and Director, Archival History of Water Project, Center for Research and Higher Studies in Social Anthropology (CIESAS), Mexico City: Huastecan pueblos, 1750–1856.
- Mario García Joya, cinematographer, Pasadena, California: The management and development of cinema in Cuba, 1960–2000.
- Diego Garcia Lambas, Professor of Astronomy, National University of Córdoba; Independent Researcher, National Research Council of Argentina (CONICET): Large-scale structure of the universe.
- Alicia Genovese, poet, Buenos Aires; Associate Professor of Literature, Kennedy University, Buenos Aires: Poetry.
- Andrea Giunta, Associate Professor of Art History, University of Buenos Aires; Associate Researcher, National Research Council of Argentina (CONICET): The problem of the representation of violence in art.
- Henry Eric Hernández García, artist, Havana, Cuba: Art interventions.
- Rafael Herrera, Visiting assistant professor of mathematics, University of California, Riverside: Classification problems in Riemannian geometry of manifolds with special structures.
- Roberto Jacoby, artist, Buenos Aires; executive director, Fundacion Sociedad Tecnologia Arte (START), Buenos Aires: Networking interdisciplinary public art.
- Diana Jerusalinsky, Associate Professor of Biology, University of Buenos Aires; Independent Researcher, National Research Council of Argentina (CONICET): In vivo gene transfer to the hippocampus with herpes simplex derived vectors.
- Rafael Linden, Professor of Neuroscience, Institute of Biophysics, Federal University of Rio de Janeiro: Mechanisms of modulation of retinal cell death.
- Marcos Magalhães, film maker, Rio de Janeiro: Film animation.
- María Emma Mannarelli, Assistant Professor of History and Director, Gender Studies Program, Universidad Nacional Mayor de San Marcos, Lima: Writing, sexuality, and the process of secularization in Peru, 1895–1930.
- Carmen McEvoy, Associate Professor of History, University of the South: War and the national imagination in Chile, 1869–1884.
- María Moreno, writer, Buenos Aires; Editor, "Supplemento Las 12", Pagina 12, Buenos Aires: The Left, society, and sexuality in Argentine political culture.
- Paulo A. S. Mourao, Professor of Biochemistry, Federal University of Rio de Janeiro: New anticoagulant polysaccharides from marine invertebrates.
- Delfina Muschietti, poet, Buenos Aires, Argentina; Professor of Theory and Literary Analysis, University of Buenos Aires: Poetry.
- Mariano Narodowski, Professor of Education, National University of Quilmes, Buenos Aires: A theoretical model of the modes of education provision.
- Federico Neiburg, Professor of Social Anthropology, National Museum, Federal University of Rio de Janeiro: The social construction of a culture of economics in Argentina, 1950–2000.
- Hermann M. Niemeyer, Professor of Chemical Ecology, University of Chile: Chemoecological studies involving aphids and lizards.
- Isabel Parra, independent artist, Santiago, Chile; President, Violeta Parra Foundation, Santiago: An anthology of exile.
- Ana Irene Pizarro Romero, Professor of Latin American Literature and Cultural Studies, University of Santiago, Chile: Cultural design in the Amazon.
- Santiago Porter, photographer, Buenos Aires; Staff Photographer, Clarín: Photography.
- Ricardo Pozas Horcasitas, Research Professor, Institute of Social Research, National Autonomous University of Mexico (UNAM): The Sixties in Latin America.
- José Manuel Prieto, writer, Mexico City; Research Professor, Center for Economic Research and Teaching, Mexico City: Fiction.
- Hernán Quintana, Professor of Astronomy and Astrophysics, Pontifical Catholic University of Chile: Surveys of the large-scale structure of the universe.
- Walter Stephan Riedweg, artist, Rio de Janeiro: Collaborative interdisciplinary public art (in collaboration with Mauricio de Mello Dias).
- Eduardo Rivera López, Associate Professor of Philosophy, Universidad Torcuato di Tella, Buenos Aires; Researcher, National Research Council of Argentina (CONICET): Ethical issues in genetics and reproductive decisions.
- Juan Pablo Rossetti, Assistant Professor of Mathematics, National University of Córdoba: Classification of lattices.
- Marcelo Rubinstein, independent researcher, National Research Council of Argentina (CONICET): The role of central dopamine D2 receptors in mice carrying targeted conditional mutations.
- Juan Carlos Rulfo, film maker, Mexico City; Administrative and Creative Manager, La Media Productions, Mexico City: Film making.
- Vera Sala, Choreographer, São Paulo; Professor of Communication and Arts of the Body, Pontifical Catholic University of São Paulo: Choreography.
- Graciela Speranza, Professor of Argentine Literature, University of Buenos Aires: Argentine literature and the visual arts.
- Daniel Mario Ugarte, coordinator, Electron Microscopy Facility, National Synchrotron Light Laboratory (LNLS), Campinas, Brazil: Characterization and manipulation of nanosystems.
- André Vilaron, photographer, Rio de Janeiro: Photography.
- Helen Marie Zout, photographer, Buenos Aires, Argentina: Photography.

== See also ==
- Guggenheim Fellowship
