= Alexander Cools =

Dutch behavioral pharmacologist

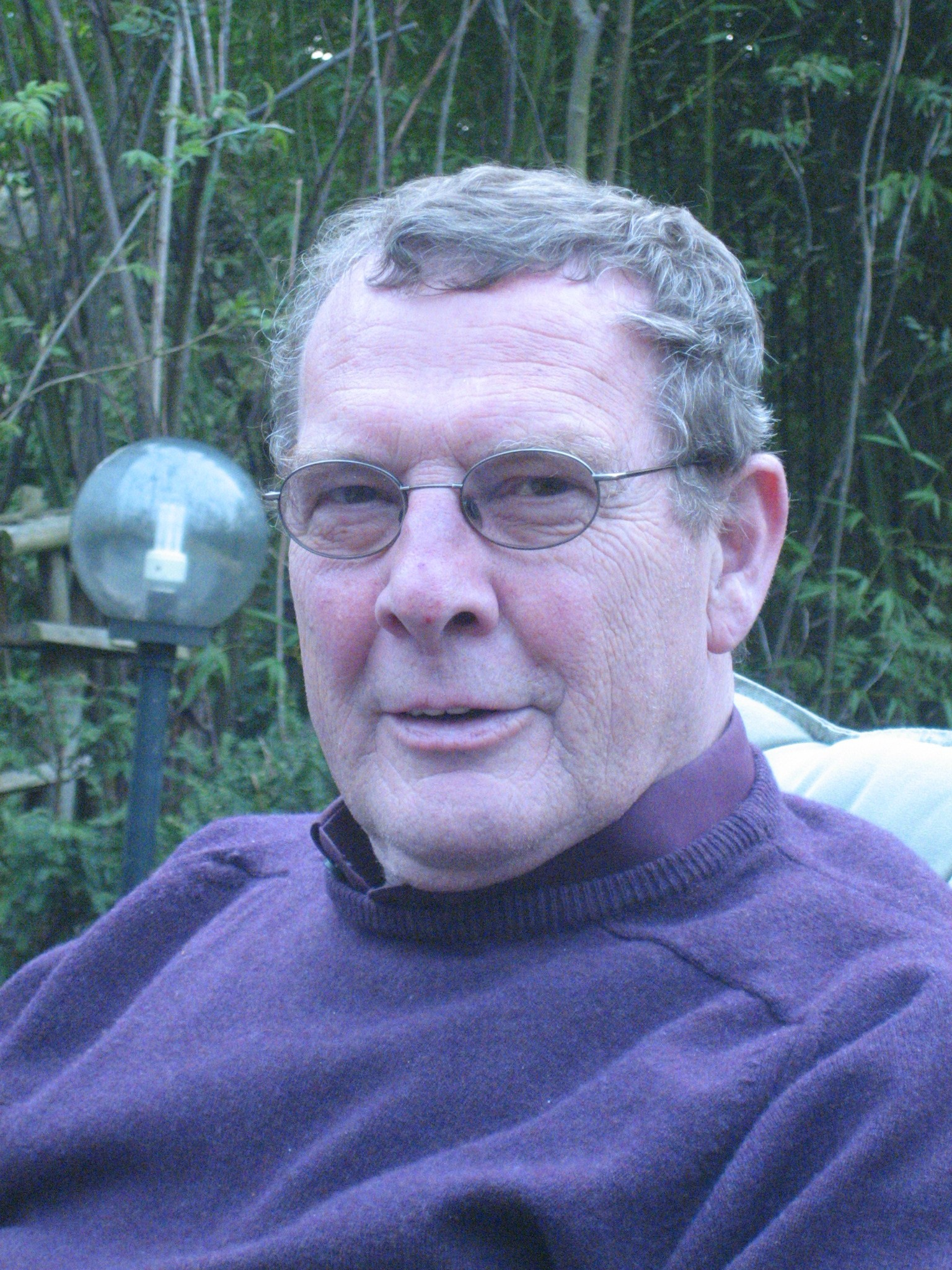
- Born: 1941; The Hague, Netherlands
- Died: 7 September 2013 (aged 71); Nijmegen, The Netherlands
- Education: Radboud University Nijmegen
- Known for: Research on dopamine and the basal ganglia
- Awards: Distinguished Achievement Award (EBPS)
- Scientific career
- Fields: Psychoneuropharmacology
- Workplaces: Radboud University Nijmegen
- Thesis: The Caudate Nucleus and Neurochemical Control of Behaviour: The Function of Dopamine and Serotonin in the Caput Nuclei Caudati of Cats (1973)
- Doctoral advisor: Jacques van Rossum, Jo Vossen

Signature
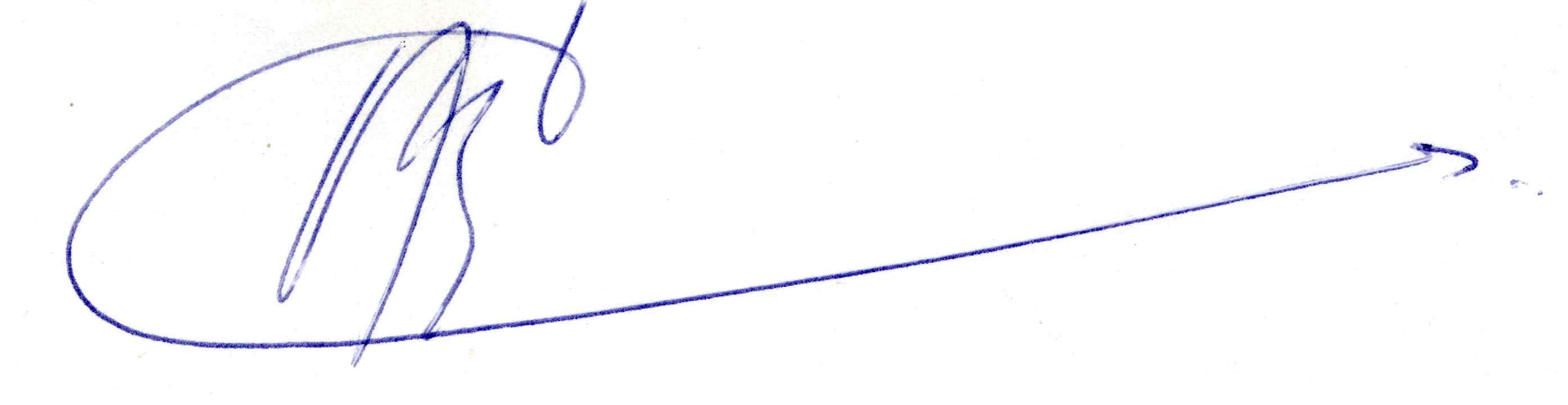

Alexander ("Lex") Rudolf Cools (1941 in The Hague – 7 September 2013 in Nijmegen) was a Dutch behavioral pharmacologist.

He obtained his Ph.D. under the supervision of Jacques van Rossum and Jo Vossen in 1973 at the Radboud University Nijmegen, where he was a professor from 1985 until his retirement in 2006. In 2014, a special issue of the scientific journal Behavioural Pharmacology was dedicated to his memory. Cools was one of the founders of the European Behavioural Pharmacology Society and its second president. In 2003 he received that society's Distinguished Achievement Award.

In 1976, Cools was the first to propose the existence of different types of dopamine receptors, an essentially correct claim that initially was generally dismissed.

Besides his work on dopamine, Cools is mostly known for his work on the basal ganglia and the dorsal and ventral striatum.
