= Jane Stewart (scientist) =

Canadian neuroscientist

- Education: Queen's University, University of London
- Scientific career
- Fields: Behavioral neuroscience
- Workplaces: Concordia University

Jane Stewart OC FRSC is a Canadian neuroscientist who has been active in the fields of psychology, psychiatry, and psychopharmacology. She is a professor emerita at Concordia University in Montreal, Canada.

== Career ==
Stewart earned a Bachelor of Arts degree in psychology and biology from Queen's University in 1956, and PhD in psychology in 1959 from the University of London, England. She then started working for Ayerst Pharmaceuticals (now a subsidiary of Wyeth) in Montreal and subsequently joined Concordia University in 1962, where she served as chair of the Department of Psychology (1969–1974) and director of the Center for Studies in Behavioral Neurobiology (1990–1997). She served on many grant review committees and on the editorial boards of 11 peer-reviewed scientific journals.

== Research ==
Stewart has made contributions to multiple areas of research, such as conditioned drug effects, the motivational effects of drugs, circadian rhythms, antidepressant and antipsychotic drug action, and sexual behavior.

== Honors ==
Stewart was awarded an honorary degree from Queen's University and is a Fellow of the American Association for the Advancement of Science, the American Psychological Association, the Canadian Psychological Association, and the Royal Society of Canada. She also received the highest civilian honor in Canada. She was appointed Officer in the Order of Canada in 2007. A special issue of the journal Biological Psychiatry was dedicated to her on the occasion of her retirement in 2008.

== Significant papers ==
- Kalivas PW, Stewart J (1991). "Dopamine transmission in the initiation and expression of drug- and stress-induced sensitization of motor activity". Brain Research Reviews. 16 (3): 223–44. doi:10.1016/0165-0173(91)90007-U. PMID 1665095. S2CID 10775295. (cited over 1300 times)
- Stewart J, de Wit H, Eikelboom R (April 1984). "Role of unconditioned and conditioned drug effects in the self-administration of opiates and stimulants". Psychological Review. 91 (2): 251–68. doi:10.1037/0033-295X.91.2.251. PMID 6571424. (cited over 600 times)
- de Wit H, Stewart J (1981). "Reinstatement of cocaine-reinforced responding in the rat" (PDF). Psychopharmacology. 75 (2): 134–43. doi:10.1007/BF00432175. PMID 6798603. S2CID 2627859. (cited over 400 times)
- Stewart J, Badiani A (1993). "Tolerance and sensitization to the behavioral effects of drugs". Behavioural Pharmacology. 4 (4): 289–312. doi:10.1097/00008877-199308000-00003. PMID 11224198. (cited over 350 times)
- Shaham Y, Shalev U, Lu L, De Wit H, Stewart J (July 2003). "The reinstatement model of drug relapse: history, methodology and major findings". Psychopharmacology. 168 (1–2): 3–20. doi:10.1007/s00213-002-1224-x. PMID 12402102. S2CID 144348217. (cited over 300 times)
