= Max Carver =

American actor (born 1988)

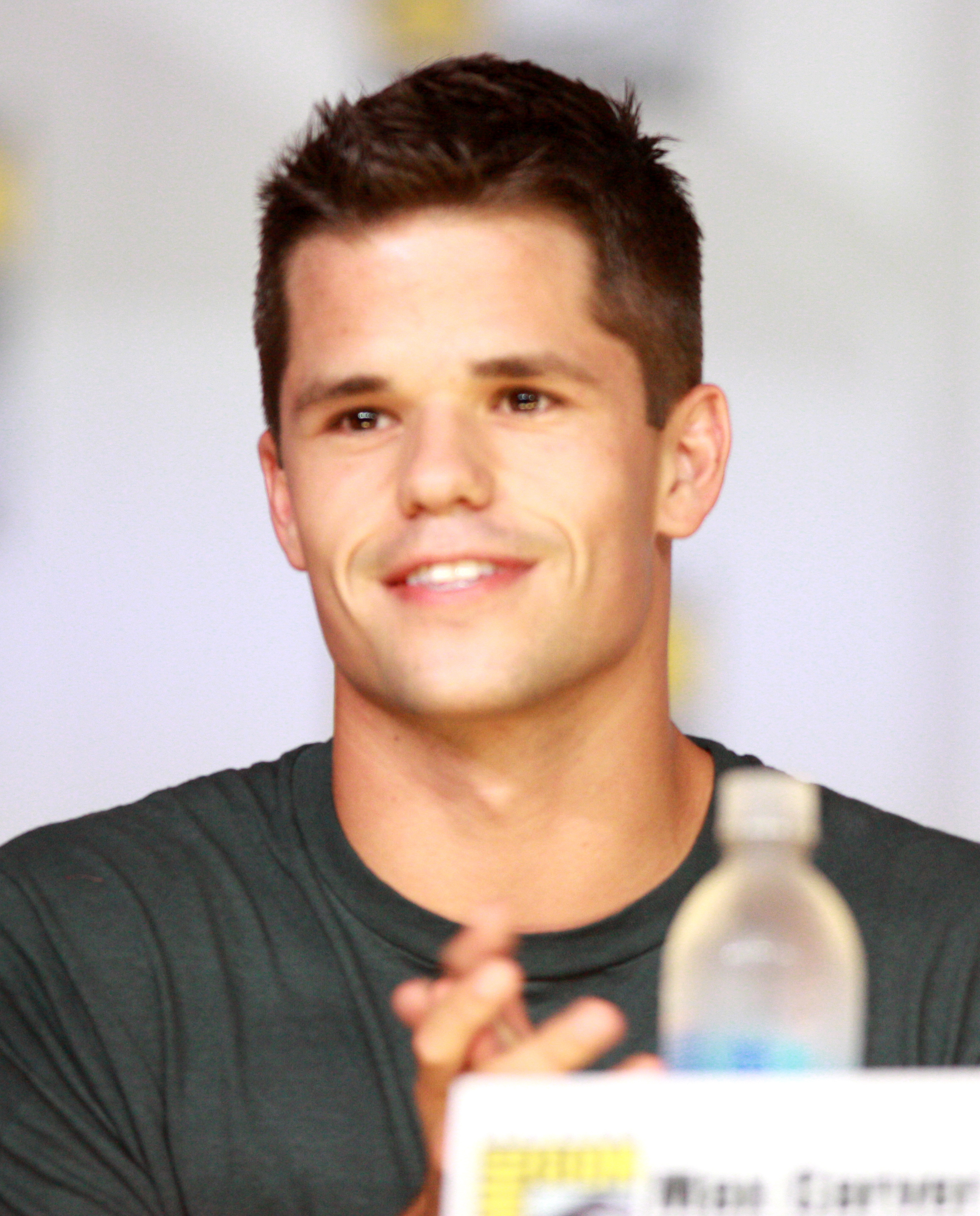
- Carver at the 2013 San Diego Comic-Con
- Born: Robert Maxwell Martensen Jr; August 1, 1988 (age 38); San Francisco, California, U.S.
- Education: University of Southern California (BA)
- Occupations: Actor; director; writer
- Years active: 2008–present
- Father: Robert Martensen
- Relatives: Charlie Carver (brother)

Max Carver (born Robert Maxwell Martensen Jr; August 1, 1988) is an American actor. He is known for his role as Preston Scavo in the ABC television series Desperate Housewives (2008–2012), as Aiden on the MTV teen-horror drama Teen Wolf (2013–2015), and in the first season of the HBO series The Leftovers (2014); his twin brother Charlie Carver portrayed the twin of his characters in all three shows.

== Early life and education ==
Max Carver was born in San Francisco, California, on August 1, 1988. His identical twin brother Charles was born seven minutes earlier on July 31. Before he began acting professionally, he was known as Max Martensen. His father was physician, historian, and author Robert Martensen, and his mother, Anne Carver, is a philanthropist and community activist. In 1992, Anne and her new husband Denis Sutro moved the family to Calistoga in Napa Valley. Max attended high school at St. Paul’s School in Concord, New Hampshire, from which he graduated in 2007. In 2012, he graduated from the University of Southern California with a bachelor's degree in English.

== Career ==
Carver's acting debut was with his brother in the ABC television series, Desperate Housewives; in which they played Preston and Porter Scavo, sons to Lynette Scavo and Tom Scavo. He then appeared with his brother in season 3 of MTV's Teen Wolf in 2013 as a pair of twin werewolves – Max played Aiden, and Charlie played Ethan. In that same year, it was announced that they were cast in the first season of HBO series The Leftovers.

Carver has also acted separately from his brother. He has guest starred on shows such as The Office, Good Luck Charlie, Victorious, and Best Friends Forever. He had a cameo role in the 2014 comedy Mantervention, playing Lifeguard Joe. He made his principal film debut in 2014 in Ask Me Anything, co-starring with Britt Robertson, Justin Long, and Martin Sheen.

== Filmography ==
=== Film ===
Year	Title	Role	Notes
2013	Dean Slater: Resident Advisor	Pissed off Guy	
2014	Ask Me Anything	Rory	
2014	Mantervention	Lifeguard Joe	
2017	Fist Fight	Daniel	
2017	A Midsummer Night's Dream	Snug	
2018	In the Cloud	Caden	
2022	The Batman	The Twin	

=== Television ===
Year	Title	Role	Notes
2008–2012	Desperate Housewives	Preston Scavo	Recurring role; 40 episodes
2009	The Office	Eric	Episode: "Gossip"
2010	Good Luck Charlie	Brad	Episode: "Double Whammy"
2012	Best Friends Forever	Corey	Episode: "Single and Lovin' It"
2012	Victorious	Evan Smith	Episode: "The Blonde Squad"
2012	NTSF:SD:SUV::	Thad	Episode: "16 Hop Street"
2012	Halo 4: Forward Unto Dawn	Cadmon Lasky	Web series; main role
2013	The Cheating Pact	Jordan	Television film
2013–2015	Teen Wolf	Aiden Steiner	Recurring role (season 3), Guest role (season 5); 20 episodes
2014	The Leftovers	Adam Frost	Main role (season 1)
2014	Grand Theft Auto: Give Me Liberty	Claude	Television film
2015	The Following	Reggie	Episode: "Home"
2016	Filthy Preppy Teens	Chaad Bishop	Main role
2016	Cupcake Wars	Himself	Guest star
2025	9-1-1	Cody Whiting	2 episodes
2026	The 'Burbs	Danny Daniels	5 episodes

=== Music videos ===
Year	Title	Artist(s)	Role
2016	"Rough Sweat"	White China Gold	Thomas
2016	"Where Is the Love?"	The Black Eyed Peas featuring The World	Himself

== Awards and nominations ==
Year	Association	Category	Work	Result	Ref
2008	Screen Actors Guild Award	Outstanding Performance by an Ensemble in a Comedy Series	Desperate Housewives	Nominated	
