= Natalie Bible' =

American film director

- Born: Natalie Meredith Bible'; November 9, 1983 (age 42); Knoxville, Tennessee, United States
- Occupations: Film editor, director, screenwriter, producer
- Years active: 2010–present

Natalie Bible' (born November 9, 1983) is an American film director, screenwriter, editor, and film producer.

== Life and career ==
Bible' was born and raised in Knoxville, Tennessee. Her first feature film Windsor Drive which she directed, edited, and produced was distributed theatrically by Indican Pictures in 2015. The film stars Samaire Armstrong, Tommy O'Reilly, Jillian Murray, Mandy Musgrave, and Matt Cohen.

In 2016, Bible' was working on her second feature William Froste.

In April 2022, Bible was set to direct and co-write High Tide starring Andrew Keegan and Sonalii Castillo.

== Filmography ==
Year	Title	Position
2015	Windsor Drive	Director/editor/producer
2016	William Froste	Director/producer
