= Windsor Drive (film) =

- Film poster
- Directed by: Natalie Bible'
- Written by: T.R. Gough
- Produced by: Brieanna Steele
- Starring: Samaire Armstrong; Tommy O'Reilly; Mandy Musgrave; Jillian Murray; Matt Cohen
- Cinematography: Carl Bartels
- Edited by: Natalie Bible'
- Music by: Karsten Shreve
- Production company: Absinthe Productions
- Distributed by: Indican Pictures
- Release date: August 28, 2015
- Running time: 85 minutes
- Country: United States
- Language: English

Windsor Drive is a 2015 American psychological thriller film directed by Natalie Bible' in her directorial debut.

== Plot ==
River Miller is a mentally unstable actor haunted by the past. He moves to Hollywood to start his life over, only to find his inner demons are inescapable.

== Cast ==
- Tommy O'Reilly as River
- Samaire Armstrong as Brooke
- Mandy Musgrave as June
- Jillian Murray as Jordana
- Matt Cohen as Matt
- Anna Gurji as Ivy
- Brieanna Steele as Liz
- Kyan DuBois as Wulfric
- Maetrix Fitten as Randy

== Reception ==
Frank Scheck of The Hollywood Reporter said " Lacking a compelling storyline and convincing performances, Windsor Drive ultimately proves a dead end." Martin Tsai of The Los Angeles Times gave it an unfavorable review.
