= Diana Jerusalinsky =

Argentine neuroscientist (born 1947)

- Born: 23 June 1947 (age 79); Buenos Aires, Argentina
- Occupation: Neuroscientist
- Children: 1
- Awards: Guggenheim Fellowship (2002)

Academic background
- Education: University of Buenos Aires (licentiate and PhD)
- Thesis: Vías colinérgicas en el sistema nervioso central: Desarrollo y localización de receptores colinérgicos muscarínicos y actividad de acetilcolinesterasa (1986)

Academic work
- Sub-discipline: Neurogenetics
- Institutions: University of Buenos Aires; Federal University of Rio Grande do Sul

Diana Alicia Jerusalinsky (born 23 June 1947) is an Argentine neuroscientist. She is currently a full professor at the University of Buenos Aires and a principal investigator at the National Scientific and Technical Research Council. A 2002 Guggenheim Fellow, her work includes neuropsychology, with one of her research projects involving gene therapy for Alzheimer's disease.

== Biography ==
Diana Alicia Jerusalinsky was born on 23 June 1947 in Buenos Aires. She obtained her licentiate from the University of Buenos Aires in 1972.

In 1983, Jerusalinsky joined the National Scientific and Technical Research Council (CONICET) as an independent researcher. She returned to UBA in 1986, starting as an assistant professor of biology before being promoted to associate professor in 1990. While an assistant professor at UBA, she obtained a PhD in biological sciences from their Faculty of Exact and Natural Sciences in 1987; Her doctoral dissertation Vías colinérgicas en el sistema nervioso central: Desarrollo y localización de receptores colinérgicos muscarínicos y actividad de acetilcolinesterasa (1986) was supervised by Eduardo De Robertis. She was a postdoctoral fellow at the University of Bath (1990-1991) under George Lunt, specializing in neurotransmitter release.

In 1999, Jerusalinsky joined the Federal University of Rio Grande do Sul, where she was a professor and a neuroscience postgraduate. She eventually became a full professor at UBA, and in 2009, received a promotion to principal investigator at CONICET. She is a principal member of LATBrain, where she is her country's representative.

Jerusalinsky's research is centered on neurobiology, with her laboratory at UBA studying topics like memory and information processing. In May 2002, she was a speaker at the United Nations University/Wellcome Trust-sponsored Gene Therapy in Latin America: From the Bench to the Clinic meeting, where she talked about her scientific use of Herpes simplex virus-derived vectors. That same year, she was awarded a Guggenheim Fellowship to research the use of said vectors for transferring genes in vivo to the hippocampus. In 2022, she co-directed an experimental study on applying gene therapy to mice to reverse memory loss as a treatment for Alzheimer's disease, the results of which were published in Molecular Therapy; it was featured in Infobae's "15 milestones of Argentine science in 2022" article. She has also published in Behavioural Pharmacology and NeuroReport.

Jerusalinsky has a daughter.
