= Rush (Dean Geyer album) =

Studio album by Dean Geyer
- Released: 28 May 2007
- Recorded: January 2007 – April 2007
- Genre: Pop, pop rock
- Length: 43:26
- Label: Sony BMG

Singles from Rush
- 1. "If You Don't Mean It" Released: 7 May 2007

Professional ratings
Review scores
Source	Rating
Herald Sun	Negative

Rush is the first album by Australian singer Dean Geyer, released by Sony BMG in Australia on 28 May 2007 (see 2007 in music). The album "sums up everything that" Geyer has felt in the past year, he states "the process of creating, writing, recording and promoting has been a rush. But it's been such a joyous ride for me." Rush debuted in the top ten on the Australian ARIA Albums Chart making it his first top ten album. It also produced Geyer with his first top ten hit with "If You Don't Mean It" which spent twelve weeks in the top fifty. The album features a cover version of the Edwin McCain's song "I'll Be", that Geyer also sang on Australian Idol.

== Track listing ==
1. "If You Don't Mean It" (Chris Braide, Carl Falk, Didrik Thott) — 3:12
2. "I Don't Wanna Wait" (Jess Cates, Lindy Robbins, Greg Wells) — 3:25
3. "Rush" (Geyer, Adam Reily) — 3:40
4. "Stay" (Matthew Gerrard, Andy Stochansky) — 3:42
5. "I'll Be" (Edwin McCain) — 4:48
6. "She Comes in Waves" (Greg Johnson, Luke McMaster, Shelly Peiken) — 3:21
7. "Angel" (Geyer, Adrian Hannan, Barbara Hannan) — 3:55
8. "Written All Over Your Face" (Geyer, Tom Nichols, Paul L. Wiltshire) — 3:53
9. "She Takes Me" (Geyer, Richard Goncalves) — 3:40
10. "Can't Be You" (Anthony Egizii, Geyer, David Musumeci) — 4:06
11. "This World Won't Wait" (Geyer, Michael Stangel) — 3:28
12. "Secret Place" (Geyer, Reily) — 4:16
13. "One of a Kind" (iTunes Bonus Track) (Phil Buckle, Geyer) — 3:11

== Charts ==
Chart (2007)	Peak position
Australian Albums (ARIA)	7
