= Naomi Uman =

American and Mexican experimental filmmaker

- Born: New York City, United States
- Education: California Institute of the Arts, 1998
- Known for: Video art, Film director, Visual artist
- Notable work: Leche, Removed, Unnamed Film, Videodiary 2-1-2006 To The Present
- Movement: Feminism

Naomi Uman is an American and Mexican experimental filmmaker and a visual artist. Uman received an MFA in Filmmaking from CalArts in 1998. Uman's work is often "marked by her signature handmade aesthetic, often shooting, hand-processing and editing her films with the most rudimentary of practices." She was once private chef to Gloria Vanderbilt, Malcolm Forbes, and Calvin Klein. Her award-winning films have screened widely at major international festivals as well as the Guggenheim Museum, the Whitney Museum of American Art, and the Museo de Arte Moderno in Mexico City.

== Filmography ==
- Love of 3 Oranges (1993)
- Grass (1997)
- Leche (1998)
- Removed (1999)
- Private Movie (2000)
- Developing Memory (2002)
- Hand Eye Coordination (2002)
- Clay (2008)
- Coda (2008)
- Kalendar (2008)
- On This Day (2008)
- Unnamed Film (2008)

== Awards ==
Uman was awarded the Guggenheim Fellowship for Film, US & Canada in 2002. In 2008 she was awarded a Media Arts Fellowship by Tribeca Film Institute.
