= Takashi Fujitani =

American Historian of Japan

- Occupation: Historian

Academic background
- Education: University of California, Berkeley (PhD)

Academic work
- Discipline: History
- Sub-discipline: History of Japan
- Institutions: University of California, San Diego; University of Toronto
- Notable works: Splendid Monarchy: Power and Pageantry in Modern Japan Race for Empire: Koreans as Japanese and Japanese as Americans during World War II

Takashi Fujitani is a historian of modern Japan and professor emeritus of Japanese history at the University of Toronto. His scholarship focuses on nationalism, colonialism, race, and war memory in modern Japanese history, particularly in the late nineteenth and early-to-mid twentieth centuries. He is known for influential studies of the cultural and political practices through which modern Japan constructed imperial authority and mobilized colonial subjects, most notably his monographs Splendid Monarchy: Power and Pageantry in Modern Japan (1996), and Race for Empire: Koreans as Japanese and Japanese as Americans during World War II (2011).

== Early life ==
Fujitani was born in Chicago and raised in Berkeley, California as a second-generation Japanese American (nisei). He recalls being highly influenced by black culture as a child, especially the music of R & B, including James Brown.

== Academic career ==
Fujitani earned his PhD in history from the University of California, Berkeley in 1986. Thereafter, Fujitani joined the faculty of the University of California, Santa Cruz, University of California, San Diego, and Doshisha University, where he taught classes on modern Japan, imperialism, and transnational histories of race and empire.

In 2011, Fujitani joined the University of Toronto as Professor of History and the inaugural Dr. David Chu Professor in Asia-Pacific Studies at the Asian Institute, where he worked on interdisciplinary initiatives focused on empire, colonialism, and global history.

== Scholarship ==
Fujitani’s research focuses on the political and cultural history of modern Japan, with particular attention to nationalism, imperialism, and race. His work has emphasized how imperial power was constructed through symbolic practices and how colonial subjects were incorporated into Japanese wartime mobilization.

His first major monograph, Splendid Monarchy: Power and Pageantry in Modern Japan (1996), analyzes imperial ceremonies and public rituals in the Empire of Japan to show how they helped produce and legitimize modern imperial authority.

In Race for Empire: Koreans as Japanese and Japanese as Americans during World War II (2011), Fujitani examines wartime racial policies affecting Koreans under Japanese colonial rule and Japanese Americans in the United States, highlighting the shifting and contingent nature of racial categories in wartime states.

He has also edited and contributed to collaborative works on empire and colonialism that place Japanese imperial history within broader global and comparative frameworks.

== Awards and fellowships ==
- External Faculty Fellow, Stanford Humanities Center (2002–2003)
- Guggenheim Fellowship (2002)
- Fellowship, American Council of Learned Societies (2002)
- Grant-in-Aid, American Council of Learned Societies (1990)

Additional fellowships and research grants have included support from the Social Science Research Council, the Institute for Research in Humanities at Kyoto University, the Humanities Research Institute at University of California, Irvine, the University of California President’s Research Fellowship in the Humanities, the American Philosophical Society, and the Reischauer Institute of Japanese Studies at Harvard University.

== Selected works ==
- Fujitani, Takashi (1996). Splendid Monarchy: Power and Pageantry in Modern Japan. Berkeley: University of California Press.
- Fujitani, Takashi; White, Geoffrey M.; Yoneyama, Lisa (2001). Perilous Memories: The Asia-Pacific War(s). Durham: Duke University Press.
- Fujitani, Takashi (2011). Race for Empire: Koreans as Japanese and Japanese as Americans during World War II. Berkeley: University of California Press.
