= Dean Geyer =

Australian singer-songwriter and actor (born 1986)

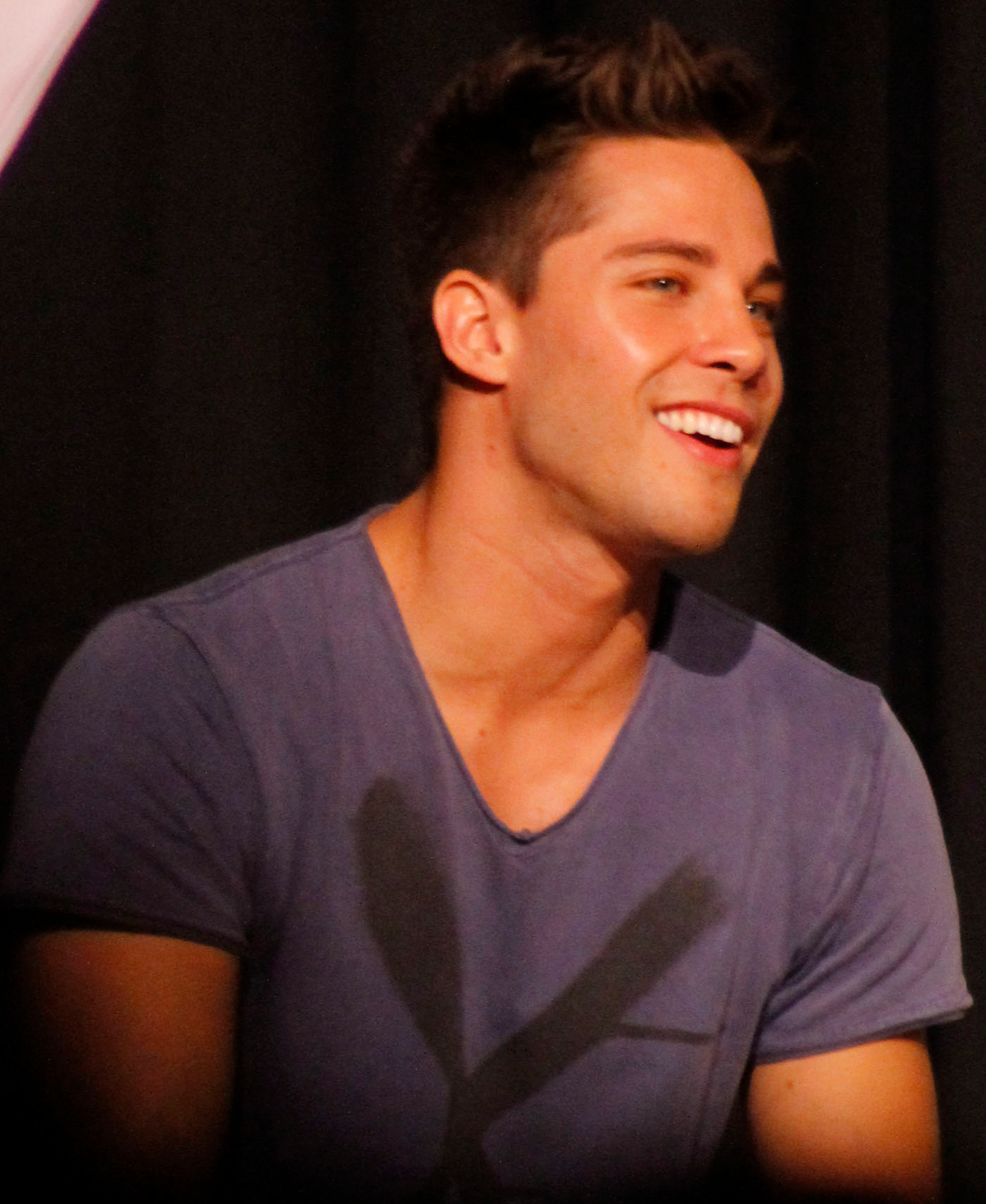
- Dean Geyer at an event organised by Young Storytellers Foundation at a school in Culver City, 21 October 2012

Background information
- Born: Dean Stanley Geyer; 20 March 1986 (age 40); Johannesburg, South Africa
- Origin: Australia
- Genre: Pop rock
- Occupations: Singer-songwriter; actor
- Instruments: Vocals; guitar
- Years active: 2003–present
- Label: Sony BMG (2006–2008)
- Spouse: Jillian Murray (m. 2017)

Dean Stanley Geyer (born 20 March 1986) is a South African Australian singer-songwriter, actor and martial artist who finished third in the 2006 season of the talent show television series Australian Idol, and has had a notable role in the Australian soap opera Neighbours as Ty Harper. He joined the cast of the US show Glee in the 4th season as NYADA Junior Brody Weston and appeared in Terra Nova as Mark Reynolds.

== Early life ==
Geyer was born in Johannesburg, South Africa, as the oldest of three children. His father, Keith Geyer, is a sensei in JKA Karate who appeared in two South African films, Kill or Be Killed and Kill and Kill Again. He has two younger sisters, Jess Geyer (now Jess Burns) and Tatum Geyer (now Tatum Prins), who share his interest in martial arts. Geyer's interest in music started early in his childhood. He learned to play the guitar, and wrote his first song entitled "Change" which was based on his move from South Africa to Australia. During his schooling life in Melbourne, Australia, he attended Melbourne High School – a selective-entry, all boys' school in South Yarra, Victoria. At his Australian Idol audition, he played a self-composed song called "Nice to Meet You".

In 2004, Geyer formed a band called "Third Edge" and recorded his original music at Studio 52. Studio 52 then permitted Geyer and his band to perform at the Kool Skools awards night, but they only received a nomination.

Dean is a Christian and has been open about this calling in his life especially during his Australian Idol days.

== Career ==
Geyer auditioned for the fourth series of Australian Idol in his Australian hometown of Melbourne. After singing Marc Cohn's "Walking In Memphis", Geyer played a self-composed piece called "Nice to Meet You". This song was praised by the three judges, who unanimously voted to send him through to the Top 100.

Geyer survived the culling rounds in Sydney, where the Top 100 are reduced to the Top 24. He sang "I Don't Wanna Be" by Gavin DeGraw for his elimination performance, and later performed the U2 smash hit "Beautiful Day" with Chris Murphy. They became close friends and impressed the judges with their voices and their camaraderie. Geyer was the first contestant who was accepted by Idol into the top 100. On 28 May, Geyer was the second contestant voted into the top 12.

Geyer's performance of Ryan Cabrera's "On the Way Down" on 15 October received a "touchdown" from judge Mark Holden. His Disco performance in the Final 8 of "Turn the Beat Around" included a front handspring by Geyer off the side of the stage and a backflip at the end of his performance. In the weeks leading up to the final of Australian Idol 2006, Geyer was selected by both Mark Holden and former Idol judge Ian Dickson as their favourites for winning the competition.

On 12 November, Geyer received a second Touchdown from Mark Holden after his performance of Edwin McCain's "I'll Be". Although Geyer was one of the most popular characters in the behind-the-scenes interviews on Idol Backstage, he was eliminated from the show on 13 November after receiving the lowest number of votes from home viewers losing out to runner-up Jessica Mauboy and eventual winner, Damien Leith.

=== 2006–09: Rush and Neighbours ===
Within weeks of the Australian Idol fourth-season finale Geyer signed a multiple album recording-contract with Sony BMG Australia. Geyer worked with Grammy Award nominated Music Producer Greg Wells and co-wrote eight of the thirteen tracks on his debut album. In March 2007 Geyer performed at the Celebrity Grand Prix in Melbourne in which the singles was unreleased at the time. In April that same year Geyer released his debut single If You Don't Mean It which peaked on the ARIA Charts at No. 10. The album, recorded in early February, was released on 26 May 2007 On 26 May 2007 Geyer released his long-anticipated debut album Rush which debuted and peaked at No. 7 on the ARIA Charts and received mixed reviews from critics. Despite a successful first week the album quickly dropped out of the charts due to little promotion and no planned second single. Geyer was to support Young Divas on their nationwide Australian tour but dropped out to instead promote Rush in several in-store appearances and signings. Later that year Geyer supported ARIA Award-Winning Duo The Veronicas on their Hook Me Up Australian Tour. In March 2008 Geyer portrayed the role of then fiancée Lisa Origliasso in the duo's music video This Love. That same year Sony BMG dropped Geyer due to the under-performance of Rush.

In November 2007, Jonathon Moran from The Daily Telegraph reported Geyer had joined the cast of long-running soap opera Neighbours. Geyer portrayed the role of Ty Harper an aspiring musician who had dropped out of law-school and moved to Erinsborough. Geyer worked with Neighbours drama coach Mike Bishop for four months to help prepare himself for the role and he took vocal lessons to work with his South African accent. On 27 March 2008, Geyer made his on-screen debut to mixed reviews from critics. Geyer notably performed a duet with co-star Caitlin Stasey titled "Unforgettable", which peaked at No. 40 on the ARIA Downloads Chart. In November 2008 after eight-months on Neighbours Geyer announced he was leaving the series to revamp his music career. The following month Geyer filmed his final scenes which aired in April 2009.

=== 2010–present: International career and acting roles ===
In October 2010, it was announced Geyer would make his film debut in Never Back Down 2: The Beatdown the sequel to the 2008 film Never Back Down. Geyer portrays the role of Mike Stokes a former high school wrestler who competes in MMA. Filming began in September 2010 in Louisiana on a budget of $3 million. The film was shot over the course of four weeks with the rehearsals commencing over two weeks. In April 2011, the film premiered the ActionFest film festival. The film was released Straight-to-DVD in September that same year to mixed reviews from critics. In July 2011, Geyer made his American television debut on the VH1 Drama television series Single Ladies. In 2012, Geyer maintained a major-recurring role on the Fox Network Steven Spielberg produced science fiction drama television series Terra Nova.

In July 2012, Geyer was announced to have been cast in a recurring role in the fourth season of the Fox musical comedy drama television series Glee. Geyer portrayed the role of Brody Weston an upperclassman who becomes involved with the series protagonist Rachel Berry (Lea Michele) who both attend NYADA. Geyer made his first appearance on Glee in the series premiere episode "The New Rachel" which aired on 13 September 2012 to over 7.41 million viewers.

In 2015, Geyer played Daniel in the Georgian film, Landmine Goes Click, opposite Sterling Knight and Spencer Locke. He will also star in the films, Rehearsal, with Bruce Greenwood, Don't Wake Mommy and The Sand, all of which were released in 2015. Geyer was also in production for the TV crime-drama, Shades of Blue, starring Jennifer Lopez. He appeared in 3 episodes.

In 2020, Geyer began releasing new music again, for the first time in over a decade.

In 2023, Geyer was cast in the Zoey 101 reboot, Zoey 102. The film released on July 27, 2023 on Paramount+.

== Personal life ==
In 2007, Geyer began a relationship with Lisa Origliasso of Australian duo The Veronicas whom he met at the 2007 ARIA Awards. In April 2008, Origliasso publicly announced that she and Geyer were engaged. However, the engagement was later called off due to work commitments.

In 2010, he began dating American actress Jillian Murray. They announced their engagement on 18 December 2016. They were married on 14 September 2017. On April 2026, the couple were expecting their first child together, and on July 4, they welcomed a boy.

== Discography ==
=== Albums ===
- Rush (2007)

=== Singles ===
Year	Title	Peak chart positions	Album
Year	Title	AUS	Album
2007	"If You Don't Mean It"	10	Rush
2008	"Unforgettable" (with Caitlin Stasey)	— (Note: "Unforgettable" did not enter the ARIA Top 100 Singles Chart, but peaked at number 40 on the Australian Digital Singles Chart.)	Non-album singles
2020	"The Pretender"	—	Non-album singles
2020	"Living Skeleton"	—	Non-album singles
2020	"Runaway"	—	Non-album singles

== Filmography ==
Film
Year	Title	Role	Notes
2011	Never Back Down 2: The Beatdown	Mike Stokes	Film debut
2015	Landmine Goes Click	Daniel	
2015	The Sand	Jonah	
2015	Don't Wake Mommy	Brad	
2016	Rehearsal	Blaise Remington	
2017	Once Upon A Date	Josh Dunbrook	TV movie
2020	A Ring for Christmas	Gabe Hudson	
2023	Zoey 102	Todd	

Television
Year	Title	Role	Notes
2006	Australian Idol	Contestant (Himself)	Season 4; 3rd place
2007	Saturday Disney	Himself	Episodes: "Environmental Superheroes", "Keep Australia Beautiful"
2008–2009	Neighbours	Ty Harper	Main cast; 120 episodes
2011	Single Ladies	Gabe	Episode: "Everything Ain't What It Seems"
2011	Terra Nova	Mark Reynolds	Recurring; 12 episodes
2012–2013	Glee	Brody Weston	Recurring role (season 4); 14 episodes
2015	Casual	James	Episodes: "Friends", "Animals", "..."
2016	Shades of Blue	Nick Davis	Episode: "Pilot"
2016	I'm a Celebrity...Get Me Out of Here!	Contestant (Himself)	Season 2, placed 9th/12
2021	Christmas in the Pines	Mark	Television film
2026	9-1-1	Zane Williams	Episode: “Secrets”
2026 – Present	General Hospital	Tristan Rogers	Regular Role

== Awards ==
Year	Result	Award	Category	Nominated work
2004	Won	TREV Awards (Tertiary Recreation Entertainment Victoria)	Best Acoustic Act	James Dean (Dean Geyer's Band)
2009	Won	Nickelodeon Australian Kids' Choice Awards	Fave Hottie	
2009	Nominated	Logie Awards of 2009	Most Popular New Male Talent	Neighbours

== Countdown ==
Year	Countdown	Position
2006	TV Guide Australia's "Hottest Guys on Television"	No. 2
2006	POPrepublic.tvm "Male Hottie of 2006"	No. 2

=== Musical influences ===
He has stated that his two music idols are Bon Jovi and Marc Cohn.

== Bibliography ==
=== Contributor ===
- Geyer, Dean (2007). "Contributor". Laugh Even Louder!. By Camp Quality. Gosford, New South Wales: Scholastic Australia Pty Limited. ISBN 978-1-74169-022-4.
