= The Squeeze (2015 film) =

- Directed by: Terry Jastrow
- Screenplay by: Terry Jastrow
- Produced by: Anne Archer; Michael Doven; Terry Jastrow; Brian McCormack; George Parra
- Starring: Jeremy Sumpter; Jillian Murray; Christopher McDonald; Katherine LaNasa; Michael Nouri
- Cinematography: Taron Lexton
- Edited by: Eric Treiber; Alexa Vier
- Music by: Michael D. Simon
- Production company: JAM Films
- Distributed by: ARC Entertainment
- Release date: April 17, 2015
- Running time: 95 minutes
- Country: United States
- Language: English

The Squeeze is a 2015 American feature film starring Jeremy Sumpter as Augie, a young golfer who just won the local tournament by 15 strokes and tied and broke the public course record during the tournament, and is seduced by a gambler to play golf for bet money. Everything goes well until he goes to Las Vegas and has his life and his family on the line on a high stake gambling scheme. The film mixes golf with gambling and Christian ethics. The film was based on the real-life events of Keith Flatt.

The film was written and directed by Terry Jastrow, a senior producer of many golf tournaments, winner of 7 Emmy Awards and is recognized by his innovations on golf and sports television coverage.

== Cast ==
- Jeremy Sumpter as Augie
- Jillian Murray as Natalie
- Christopher McDonald as Ríverboat
- Katherine LaNasa as Jessie
- Michael Nouri as Jimmy Diamonds
- Jason Dohring as Aaron Bolt
- Mekia Cox as Lana
- David O'Donnell as John Tom
- David Andrews as Billy Bob
