= Helen Zout =

Argentine photographer

Helen Marie Zout (b. 1957) is an Argentine photographer. Zout is based in Buenos Aires, Argentina.

Her best well known works relate to the disappearances carried out by the military dictatorship in Argentina between 1974 and 1983. Her work is included in the collection of the Museo Nacional de Bellas Artes, and the Museum of Fine Arts, Houston.

She was awarded a Guggenheim Fellowship in 2002.
