= Mantervention =

2014 film by Stuart Acher

- Theatrical release poster
- Directed by: Stuart Acher
- Written by: Juan E.G.
- Produced by: Jordan Rosner; Gato Scatena; Joel Michaely
- Starring: Chloe Bridges; Nick Roux; Jillian Murray; Max Carver; Travis Van Winkle; Mario Van Peebles
- Cinematography: John Matysiak
- Edited by: Brad E. Wilhite
- Production companies: Scatena & Rosner Films
- Distributed by: Vision Films
- Release dates: July 17, 2014 (TCL Chinese Theater); September 5, 2014 (United States)
- Running time: 98 minutes
- Country: United States
- Language: English

Mantervention is a 2014 American sex comedy film directed by Stuart Acher and written by Juan E.G. The film stars Chloe Bridges, Nick Roux, Jillian Murray, Max Carver, Travis Van Winkle, and Mario Van Peebles.

== Premise ==
Spencer is a heartbroken college student who finds himself trapped in an endless cycle of crying and masturbation, so his best friend Coke decides to put him through a "mantervention" in order to help him get over his ex.

== Cast ==
- Nick Roux as Spencer
- Travis Van Winkle as Coke
- Chloe Bridges as Katie
- Mario Van Peebles as Steve
- Randy Wayne as Kip
- Sarah Baldwin as Allison
- Lindsay Pearce as Monica
- Deep Roy as massage parlor owner
- Jillian Murray as Madisyn
- Max Carver as Lifeguard Joe
- Josie Davis as TSA supervisor
- Rich Franklin as Coach Billings
- Stephanie Faracy as Spencer's mom
- Daniel Cormier as himself
- K. J. Noons as himself
- Dwayne Johnson as MMA fighter
- Megan Albertus as tipsy girl
- Mindy Robinson as Beach Hottie

== Production ==
Mantervention is an independent film speculatively produced in 2013 by Scatena & Rosner Films. In January 2014 at the Sundance Film Festival, Vision Films picked up the sales and distribution rights for the picture.

== Release ==
Mantervention premiered at TCL Chinese Theater on July 17, 2014. It was released on September 5, 2014, in select theaters in the United States and through video on demand. The film was initially released across the U.S. on digital cable video-on-demand platforms including Comcast, DirecTV, Xfinity, Cox, Time Warner Cable, Charter Communications, and Mediacom. The only U.S. domestic cable provider to not pick up Mantervention was U-Verse. The film is also available on iTunes, Amazon.com, Best Buy, Hulu, Vudu, and Walmart.

=== Marketing ===
Scatena & Rosner Films executed a marketing campaign targeting the college demographic and also included a limited theatrical release in numerous college markets including University of Alabama, Florida State University, University of Florida, Georgia Institute of Technology, North Carolina State University, and Arizona State University. The campaign employed local street teams, cross-promotions with local restaurants and companies, and interviews and press exposure within the local communities. The campaign was well-received in all markets and led to positive reviews and increased viewership.

== Reception ==
Mantervention won the Audience Award for Best Feature Film at the 2014 Bel Air Film Festival.
