= Panna Czinka =

Hungarian-Romani violinist

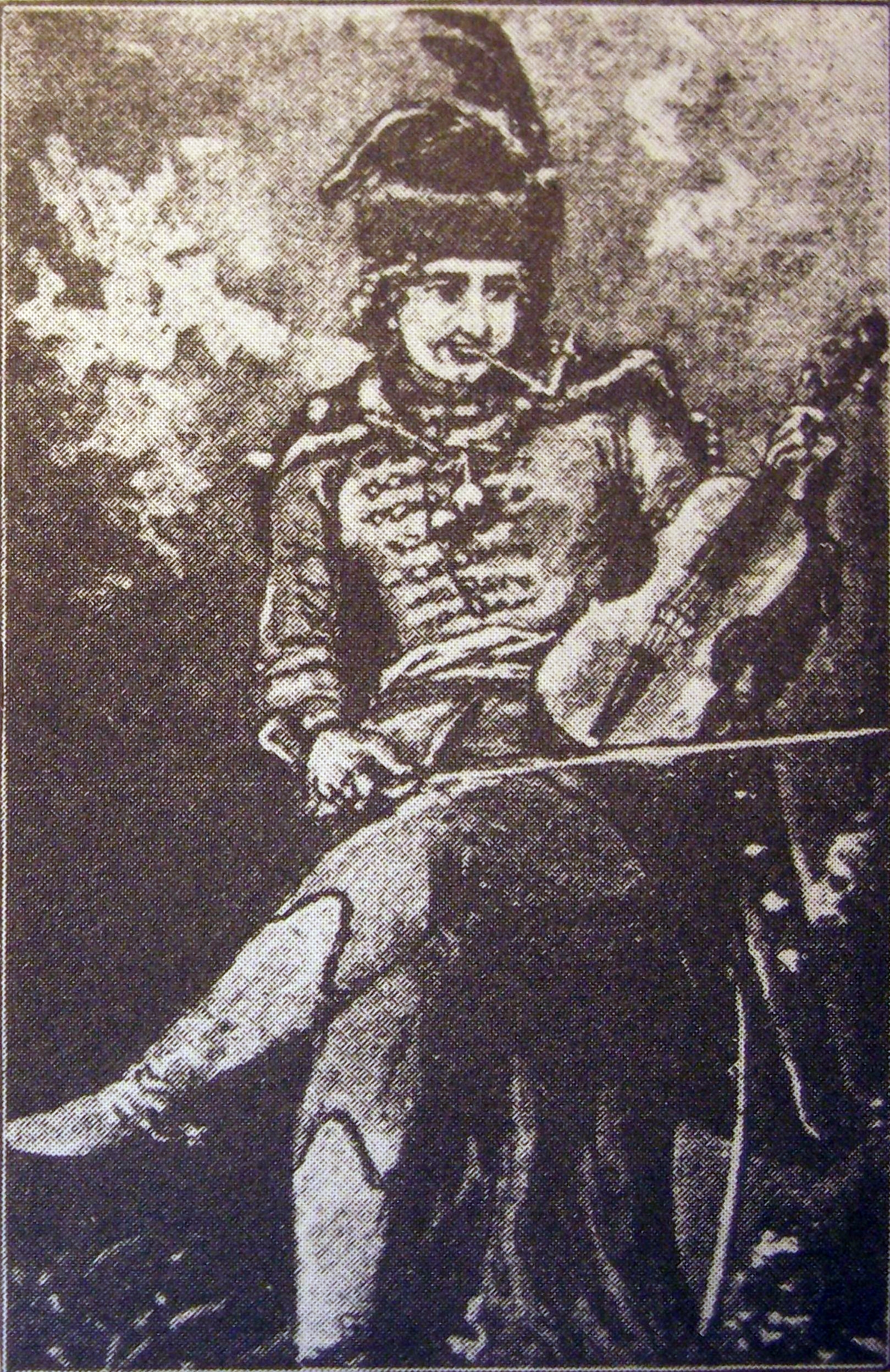
Panna Czinka

Panna Czinka (Hungarian: Czinka Panna, Slovak: Panna Cinková) (c. 1711– 1772) was a famous Hungarian-Romani violinist.

== Life ==
Czinka was born in Sajógömör, Hungary (modern-day Gemer, Slovakia) to a Romani family of musicians. Her father was a court musician of Francis II Rákóczi. Her father and brothers are said to be the authors of the Rákóczi March.

She studied music in Rozsnyó (today Rožňava) and married a Romani musician-blacksmith. Legends claim that she played violin at the age of 9. After 1725 Czinka formed a music band with her husband and brothers-in-law. She designed a uniform of sorts for the band. She became famous for her skill with the violin. She played first violin in this ensemble. The band toured abroad and was invited to perform in noble houses. She also gave birth to four sons and one daughter.

Panna Czinka died in 1772 and was buried on 5 February in Sajógömör. Her grave has not survived. Many Hungarian writers and composers — such as Mór Jókai, Zoltán Kodály, and Endre Dózsa — refer to her works.

== Legacy ==
She was portrayed by Anna Gurji in Dušan Rapoš's biographical film Czinka Panna.
