= Delfina Muschietti =

Argentine poet (born 1953)

- Born: 1953 (age 72–73); Villaguay, Entre Ríos Province, Argentina
- Occupations: Poet; translator; essayist
- Writing career
- Notable awards: Guggenheim Fellowship (2002)

Delfina Muschietti (born 1953) is an Argentine poet, translator, and essayist. A 2002 Guggenheim Fellow, she has written several poetry volumes and edited a few books. She has also served as director of the University of Buenos Aires's Poetry and Translation program.

== Biography ==
Muschietti was born in 1953 in Villaguay, Entre Ríos Province.

Muschietti has published several poetry volumes, specifically Los pasos de Zoe (1993), El rojo Uccello (1996), Enero (1999), Olivos (2002), and Amnesia (2010). Writing about El rojo Uccello, Anahí Diana Mallol said that "in Delfina Muschietti's writing, the voice itself is fractured, split, and dissolved".

In 1996, Muschietti published a translated volume of Pier Paolo Pasolini's poetry, titled La mejor juventud. She has also published translations of work by Attilio Bertolucci, Alda Merini, and Amelia Rosselli. She served as editor for Editorial Losada's complete works volume of Alfonsina Storni. She was the editor of Traducir poesía. Mapa rítmico, partitura y plataforma flotante (2014; lit. "Translating Poetry: The Task of Repeating in Another Language"); Clarín called it "one of the most important books on this subject written in recent years".

Muschietti is also an essayist, with her work focusing on subjects such as Oliverio Girondo, Juan Laurentino Ortiz, Alejandra Pizarnik, and Storni. In 2000, she won an Antorchas Foundation to work on Más de una lengua, an essay book centered on contemporary Argentine poetry. She was also a contributor to the 2006 edited volume Literatura argentina. Siglo XX, Tomo II, Yrigoyen entre Borges y Arlt (1916–1930), where she provided a gender perspective on a 1921 El Hogar article José Gabriel wrote on one of Storni's books.

Muschietti works as a professor at the University of Buenos Aires. In 2001, she became director of UBA's Poetry and Translation program.

In 2002, Muschietti was awarded a Guggenheim Fellowship in Poetry. She also won a 2004 European Union Alßan Programme.

== Works ==
- El rojo Uccello (1996)
- (ed.) Traducir poesía. Mapa rítmico, partitura y plataforma flotante (2014)
