= If You Don't Mean It =

Single by Dean Geyer

from the album Rush
- B-side: "Crazy", "We Share the Same Space"
- Released: 7 May 2007
- Recorded: 2007
- Genre: Pop
- Length: 3:12
- Label: Sony BMG
- Songwriters: Chris Braide, Carl Falk, Didrik Thott

"If You Don't Mean It" is a pop song written by Chris Braide, Carl Falk and Didrik Thott, recorded by Dean Geyer for his first album Rush (2007). Geyer states the song is about a girl who "says she loves him but doesn't show it by her actions. He gets desperate wondering if there's someone else." It was released as the album's first single in Australia on 7 May 2007, as a CD single and digital download. The single was released to Australian radio on 4 April 2007 and became the most added song to radio for that week.

The song has been covered in two different continents, both by Idol alumni as well. The first to cover it was Jon Peter Lewis, of American Idol, on his sophomore CD called Break the Silence. The second to cover it was Markus Fagervall, of Idol (Sweden), also on his sophomore CD, called Steal My Melody. Markus went on to release the song as his sophomore CD's lead single.

== Track listing ==
1. "If You Don't Mean It" – 3:14
2. "Crazy" – 2:46
3. "We Share the Same Space" – 3:33

== Chart performance ==
=== Weekly charts ===
| Chart (2007) | Peak position |
|---|---|
| Australia (ARIA) | 10 |

=== Year-end Charts ===
| Chart (2007) | Position |
|---|---|
| ARIA Singles Chart | 88 |
| Australian Artists Singles Chart | 20 |
