= Matt Cohen (actor) =

American film and television actor

- Cohen in 2026
- Born: Matthew Joseph Cohen; September 28, 1982 (age 44); Miami, Florida, U.S.
- Other name: Matthew Cohen
- Occupation: Actor
- Years active: 2000–present
- Spouse: Mandy Musgrave (m. 2011)
- Children: 1
- Website: bio.site/mattcohen

Matthew Joseph Cohen (born September 28, 1982) is an American actor and filmmaker best known for playing young John Winchester and the archangel Michael in Supernatural, Aiden Dennison on the teen drama series South of Nowhere, and as Griffin Munro on the ABC daytime soap General Hospital. In 2019, he became a correspondent for Entertainment Tonight, but was laid off in 2023.

== Early life ==
Cohen was born in Miami, Florida. He is Jewish. Cohen played football and ran track in high school. He attended American Heritage School from 2nd to 12th grade and graduated in 2001. Cohen competed in auto racing and motocross. He graduated with honors. Cohen went to Florida State where he studied business. While in college, he enrolled in acting classes. After finishing college, Cohen moved to Los Angeles to pursue acting.

== Career ==
Cohen has starred in several films such as Boogeyman 2, Dark House and he played lead character Aiden Dennison on The N's South of Nowhere. He played Syd on Rockville CA, a WB web series created by The O.C's Josh Schwartz. In 2009, he co-produced The Outside, which starred Nia Peeples, Michael Graziadei, Dante Basco and South of Nowhere's Rob Moran. In late 2008, he had a guest-starring role in the third episode of The CW's fourth season of Supernatural as a young John Winchester, which he later reprised in the fifth-season episode "The Song Remains the Same". He reappeared in the eleventh season's "Baby," but was revealed to be an unknown being posing as John Winchester to communicate with Sam in his dreams. This being was later identified as Lucifer. He portrayed Johnny Jones in the slasher–thriller film Chain Letter. He guest-starred in the fourth season of 90210 as Jeremy, after replacing Drew Seeley in the role. It was announced on August 11, 2015, that Cohen was to recur in the second season of How to Get Away with Murder as Levi, who is described as a sexy, edgy, working-class guy. He will first appear in the second episode and will appear in a total of three episodes. In 2016, he joined the cast of General Hospital as Griffin Munro. In March 2019, it was announced that Cohen would leave General Hospital, making his last appearance on March 22, 2019. In December 2019, it was announced that Cohen would return to General Hospital for a short period of time; he returned from December 6–10, 2019. In 2025, he joined the cast of The Young and the Restless as Detective Burrows; he will debut in the role on October 16 of the same year.

== Personal life ==
Cohen married his South of Nowhere co-star Mandy Musgrave on May 18, 2011. Musgrave gave birth to their son, Macklin, in April 2015.

== Filmography ==
=== Film ===
Year	Title	Role	Notes
2007	Boogeyman 2	Henry Porter	A direct-to-video horror film directed by Jeff Betancourt.
2009	The Outside	Travis	Co-Producer; Directed by Ari Davis.
2009	Dark House	Rudy	A supernatural horror film directed by Darin Scott.
2010	Chain Letter	Johnny Jones	A horror film directed by Deon Taylor.
2010	Sunnyview	Miguel	Short film directed and written by Courtney Rowe.
2011	Tai Chi & Qi Gong Basics	Lead role	Directed by James Wvinner.
2012	Trigger	Ryan	Directed and co-written by Matt Sinnreich.; Co-written by Lee Ehlers.
2012	Chutes and Ladders	Principal	Co-producer; Short film directed and written by Lee Ehlers.
2013	Windsor Drive	Matt	American surrealist psychological thriller film directed by Natalie Bible' in her directorial debut.
2014	Hard Crime	Vick Hammer	Directed and written by Lee Ehlers.
2016	Liquorice	Bentley Edison	Post-production; Directed by Natalie Bible
2019	Holiday Date	Joel	Hallmark holiday film
2023	Made for Each Other	David	Hallmark film

=== Television ===
Year	Title	Role	Notes
2005	Complex	Jacques	Television film
2005–08	South of Nowhere	Aiden Dennison	Main role
2006	The O.C.	Jim	Episode: "The Undertow" (3.18)
2008	Medium	Ryan Haas	Episode: "Lady Killer" (4.11)
2008, 2010, 2015	Supernatural	John Winchester (young), Michael, Lucifer	Episodes: "In the Beginning" (4.03; credited as Matthew Cohen), "The Song Remains the Same" (5.13), "Baby" (11.04)
2009	Nite Tales: The Series	Jon	Episode: "Black Widow" (2.09)
2010	NCIS: Los Angeles	Marine Private First Class James Winston	Episode: "Special Delivery" (2.04)
2011	90210	Jeremy	Recurring role (season 4)
2011–13	Cowgirl Up	Sheriff B. Calhoun	Episodes: #1.6, #2.1, #2.6
2013	The Client List	Victor Collins	Episode: "Save a Horse, Ride a Cowboy" (2.09)
2014	Melissa & Joey	Vic Spinelli	Episode: "House Broken"
2014	Criminal Minds	John Franklin	Episode: "If the Shoe Fits" (10.06)
2015	How to Get Away with Murder	Levi Sutter	Recurring role (season 2)
2015	Guidance	Jim	2 episodes
2016–19	General Hospital	Griffin Munro	Contract role
2017	Criminal Minds: Beyond Borders	Ryan Garrett	Recurring role

=== Other work ===
Year	Title	Role	Notes
2009	Rockville CA	Syd King	Web series
2013	Cowgirl Up	Director	Six episodes
2016–17	Kings of Con	Matt Cochran	Web series, Five episodes
2019-present	Entertainment Tonight	Co-Host	
2020-	Days of Our Lives	Director	Director Team, TV Series
2020	Supernatural	Director	Episode: "Gimme Shelter"
