= Christmas in the Pines =

- Written by: Nastasha Baron
- Directed by: Gary Wheeler
- Starring: Jillian Murray; Dean Geyer; Leigh-Allyn Baker
- Country of origin: United States
- Original language: English

Production
- Running time: 90 minutes

Original release
- Network: INSP
- Release: 2021

Christmas in the Pines is a holiday-themed film, which was released in 2021. The film follows Ariel Colt and Mark Henderson, played by Jillian Murray and Dean Geyer, who due to a real estate mishap find themselves spending Christmas together with their respective families.

It aired originally on American TV networks, firstly on INSP and then later FOX. It has more recently become available on numerous streaming platforms such as Apple TV and Amazon Prime.

== Plot ==
The film follows magazine writer, Ariel Colt, and architect, Mark Henderson. Colt who is working hard to meet deadlines before Christmas, worries that it will be the least Christmassy Christmas ever. She arrives in the small fictional mountain town of Winter Springs in North Carolina, where she has just completed the purchase of an idyllic holiday cottage.

On arrival, she is informed by the real estate agent that he has made a mistake. Both Ariel and Mark Henderson, who is also at the property, have both had their sales processed and technically both can claim they own the cottage. With possession nine tenths of the law, both Mark and Ariel refuse to leave the cottage. They are informed that they need to find a solution by Christmas, otherwise they would lose the right to buy the property and it would again be listed back on the market.

As problems arise in the cottage, each of their families arrive in a ploy to force the other out of the cottage. Instead of causing the mayhem that was planned, the families begin to find common ground and begin to speak about traditions. The division between the two slowly subsides, as the families help the two find a solution to their real estate problem.

== Cast ==
- Jillian Murray as Ariel Colt
- Dean Geyer as Mark Henderson
- Leigh-Allyn Baker as Amy Colt
- Victoria Staley as Jasmine Colt
- Grant Goodeve as Duke Henderson
- Aaron Mees as Trevor Henderson
- Jeff Rose as Peter Colt
- Eden Lee as Erica Holden
- Anthony S. Goolsby as Nick Sage
- Stephen Ware as Santa Claus
- Joseph Curtis Callender as Jeremy Huckabee

== Release ==
The film originally aired on US television in 2021 on the INSP network. It was then made available on numerous streaming platforms, including Apple TV and Amazon Prime. In the United Kingdom, Christmas in the Pines was made available on the streaming service ITVX.

== Reception ==
The Dove Foundation gave the film a positive review, approving it for all ages. It stated that the Christmas tale told a story of where "war becomes warmth." As of 2026, it scores 6.3 on IMDb.
