= José Gabriel =

Argentinian writer

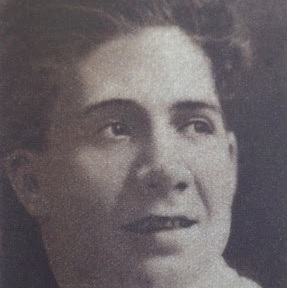
José Gabriel 1938

José Gabriel (né José Gabriel López Buisán; 1896–1957) was a Spanish-born Argentine writer and essayist.

His more important works are La fonda (The Inn), La bandera celeste (The Light Blue Flag), Vida del General Lamadrid (Life of General Lamadrid) and Vida y muerte en Aragón (Life and Death in Aragon).

His biography of Evaristo Carriego was used by Jorge Luis Borges for his famous work on the poet.
