= Michael Lucey =

American literary scholar

- Occupations: Literary scholar and academic

Academic background
- Education: B.A. in the College of Letters; M.Phil. in Modern English Studies; Ph.D. in Comparative Literature
- Alma mater: Wesleyan University; University of Oxford; Princeton University

Academic work
- Institutions: University of California, Berkeley (UC Berkeley)

Michael Lucey is a literary scholar and academic, as well as a translator. He is a distinguished professor and holds the Sidney and Margaret Ancker chair in the Humanities at the University of California, Berkeley (UC Berkeley).

Lucey's scholarly work has been in the fields of sexuality studies, French, British, American, and comparative literature, as well as nineteenth and twentieth-century cultural studies, with methodological interests, including insights drawn from Pierre Bourdieu's sociology of culture and the field of linguistic anthropology, particularly the work of Michael Silverstein. He has been a fellow of the John Simon Guggenheim Foundation and has received the Aldo and Jeanne Scaglione Prize for French and Francophone Studies from the Modern Language Association (MLA).

== Education ==
In 1982, Lucey completed his B.A. in the College of Letters at Wesleyan University, and in 1984, obtained his M.Phil. in Modern English Studies from the University of Oxford. Later, in 1988, he earned his Ph.D. in Comparative Literature from Princeton University.

== Career ==
Lucey joined University of California, Berkeley in 1988 as an assistant professor, becoming associate professor in 1994 and professor in 2002. He was the Bernie H. Williams Professor from 2011 to 2015. Since 2015 and 2020, he has held the titles of distinguished professor and Sidney and Margaret Ancker chair in the Humanities.

From 1994 to 1995, Lucey was the faculty director of the Berkeley Bisexual Lesbian Gay Center, which developed an LGBT Studies program for the campus, and from 1995 to 1996, he was the program director of the new Minor Program in Lesbian, Gay, Bisexual, Transgender Studies. Between 2001 and 2007, he was the founding director of the Center for the Study of Sexual Culture. From 2005 to 2011, he chaired the Department of French.

== Works ==
Lucey authored a book titled The Misfit of the Family: Balzac and the Social Forms of Sexuality in 2003, which moved away from psychoanalytic approaches to Balzac's novels common at the time to argue that Balzac was interested in sexuality from a sociological and an epistemological point of view and to examine how Balzac explored in his novels the relationship between family, sexuality, economics, history, and law. He claimed that Balzac used literature as a means of understanding and analyzing, as well as of representing, a range of non-mainstream forms of sexuality and that Balzac was also intrigued by how the available social categorizations of sexual behaviors affect the terms of their perception. Dorothy Kelly called this a "wonderful book" because it provides a "fresh new perspective" and incorporates "excellent textual analyses". Kelly noted that the subject of "family, sexuality, money, class in Balzac" "is not really new". Yet, she said that the author's perspective is one that "rejuvenate our understanding of Balzac's textual practices and social representations". Nicholas White described it as "an urgent and compelling argument which is exceptionally well versed in Balzacian criticism". White also noted that he had an "ambivalent attitude" toward the psychoanalytical paradigm in Balzac criticism. In another book, Never Say I: Sexuality and the First Person in Colette, Gide, and Proust, he documented how depictions of sexuality, particularly same-sex sexual relationships, influenced the creation of literary prose forms in twentieth-century France and discussed the works of Marcel Proust, André Gide, and Colette, among others. He focused on these authors' use of the first person in its interlocking social and formal dimensions, studying their mobilization of the first person to convey authority, legitimacy, and authenticity in representations of same-sex sexuality. Lynne Huffer, in her review, noted that he "makes a unique and somewhat provocative argument" and "sets the stage for a series of dazzling readings".

In his 2019 publication, Someone: The Pragmatics of Misfit Sexualities, from Colette to Hervé Guibert, Lucey examined characters in French literature from the 20th century whose sexual patterns are challenging to imagine or depict, highlighting the writings of Simone de Beauvoir, Jean Genet, Colette, Hervé Guibert, and other authors. Andrew J. Counter called this book a "finely crafted and aesthetically sensitive work of literary criticism" and highlighted that the book "requires attention". He further added that the invested attention rewards so "richly that the process of reading it feels like a working together, rather than a working against". Joseph Litvak commended the work, calling it a "series of fine-grained analyses" that "provides valuable tools" for seeing "perhaps all sexualities, not just misfit sexualities". Litvak opined, however, that the author's concentration on Bourdieu "entailed the erasure or at least the subordination of other French masters", and went so far as to insist that the "book's punitive silence about Lacan seems odd". Nonetheless, Litvak also found that his discussion on free indirect discourse in Beauvoir constituted one of the book's "riches", calling it "one of the most provocative reconceptualizations of this narrative technique since D. A. Miller's Jane Austen, or the Secret of Style". Peter Cryle emphasized that the work has defined and addressed the topic in a "distinctive and enlightening manner". Cryle also noted that "some readers with a narrow allegiance to historical studies may initially find that manner disorienting", but this book eventually gives a "rewarding opportunity to suspend their disciplinary habits".

In his book What Proust Heard: Novels and the Ethnography of Talk, Lucey juxtaposed Proust's writing with that of Honoré de Balzac, Fyodor Dostoevsky, George Eliot, Virginia Woolf, Nathalie Sarraute, and Rachel Cusk to explore novelists with a particular kind of interest in talk or "language-in-use". He showed how Proust and these other novelists devote considerable energy to investigating not just what people are saying or doing when they talk, but also how talk itself is a central form of socio-cultural activity. Colton Valentine wrote a review in the Los Angeles Review of Books (LARB) describing how his "language-in-use" approach develops the significance of "a certain type of listener, someone who attends not only to words but also to how words function in particular interactions". He also mentioned that speech act theory might have the resources within it to resist his critique of its limits: "Lucey's focus on its illocutionary over perlocutionary tenets at times risks a straw man". Zakir Paul described this work as a "remarkable transposition of linguistic anthropology and novel theory" and said that it will teach readers "fine-grained, incisive ways of speaking". Andrew J. Counter called it a "brilliant book", further adding that the book is "utterly original, yet profoundly Proustian", noting that "some of that sophistication involves a kindly and timely reproach to mainstream literary criticism", because literary criticism has been somewhat inattentive to "developments in the (social) science of language", and also because it has shown such a "persistent attachment to a model of speech act theory".

== Awards and honors ==
- 2002 – Fellow, John Simon Guggenheim Foundation
- 2022 – Aldo and Jeanne Scaglione Prize for French and Francophone Studies, MLA

== Selected books ==
- Lucey, Michael (1995). Gide's Bent: Sexuality, Politics, Writing. Oxford University Press. ISBN 9780195080865.
- Lucey, Michael (2003). The Misfit of the Family: Balzac and the Social forms of Sexuality. Duke University Press. ISBN 9780822331933.
- Lucey, Michael (2006). Never Say I: Sexuality and the First Person in Colette, Gide, and Proust. Duke University Press. ISBN 9780822338574.
- Lucey, Michael (2019). Someone: the Pragmatics of Misfit Sexualities, from Colette to Hervé Guibert. The University of Chicago Press. ISBN 9780226606217.
- Lucey, Michael (2022). What Proust Heard: Novels and the Ethnography of Talk. The University of Chicago Press. ISBN 9780226816678.
