= Robert Martensen =

American physician, historian, and author

Robert Lawrence Martensen (January 1, 1947, Lake County, Ohio – September 26, 2013, Pasadena, California) was an American physician, historian, and author.

== Career and publications ==
Martensen worked as physician in emergency department and intensive care unit settings and as a professor at Harvard Medical School, University of Kansas Medical Center and Tulane University, teaching bioethics and medical history. After Hurricane Katrina, he moved to Maryland to work for the National Institutes of Health (NIH) as the director of the Office of History.

He was a recipient of a 2002 Guggenheim Fellowship towards the completion of his book The Brain Takes Shape: An Early History, published in 2004 by Oxford University Press. In 2008, Martensen's book A Life Worth Living: A Doctor's Reflections on Illness in a High-Tech Era was published by Farrar, Straus & Giroux.

=== Views and experiences ===
In a 2009 interview with The New York Times, Martensen said health care in the United States left many stakeholders dissatisfied. He said hospital administrators were unhappy because they had to focus on profit, patients felt isolated, and some physicians were quitting because they could not practice medicine in the way they wanted.

Martensen criticized end-of-life care in the United States. While most Americans die in nursing homes or hospitals, Martensen said neither are properly oriented to care for dying patients. In nursing homes, management may not want death to occur on-site, so the individual will be sent to the emergency department, and in a hospital, a dying patient may be subject to intrusive medical technology instead of palliative care (which may result from the incentives and disincentives in health insurance coverage).

Martensen discussed the end-of-life care of both his mother and father. While he was out of town and his mother was in the hospital, her physician called Martensen, saying she had a heart block and he asked if he should put in a pacemaker. Martensen, being a physician, knew which medical questions to ask, and he asked for a modest treatment. The issue was her fluids; after she was hydrated her EKG was normal.

In Martensen's 2008 book, Chapter 7, "Life in the Narrows", discusses the death of his father. Instead of having a bad death (dysthanasia) that can occur in hospitals, Martensen thought his father's death was relatively good. His father was 86, septic, had deteriorating lung function, an advance directive with a DNR, and he had started to receive morphine for air hunger. Alternatively, Martensen's father could have been put on a mechanical ventilator. However, that would have violated both Martensen and his father's wishes. Martensen explained that

... ventilators were developed to bridge difficult situations: somebody has a traumatic injury; somebody has an infection, their lungs are not functioning; somebody is recovering from surgery and their lungs are not functioning. You put them on a ventilator—the intention was [to] get them over a difficult patch and allow them to survive. For my dad, who was in his 86th year, who had a progressive deteriorating lung function, he had been doing pretty well till three weeks before he died, then things got worse. And to put him on a ventilator would have just extended that artificial functioning for an indefinite period of time. And ... your body can't tolerate a ventilator without being heavily sedated, particularly initially ... imagine something blocking your airway. Well, the brain reflex is so primitive and so powerful, you'll do anything to get it out. And the way medicine counters that is by initially paralyzing people but then sedating them and giving them pain meds and so forth. That to my father would have been anathema, and it also—from my father's point of view, and I happen to agree with him—would have been to no purpose, because ... he never would have gotten off the ventilator. Instead of dying in two days, he might have died in two weeks or two months later, but he never would have been able to get off the ventilator because he didn't have the lung function.

As the morphine began to act on Martensen's father, his anxiety from air hunger was lessening and he was still conscious. Martensen told his father he thought that life was slipping away, that he thought it was his time, that he loved him, and that was going to remove the oxygen; Martensen's father replied, "thank you."

== Education ==
Martensen was educated at Harvard University (B.A., 1969), Geisel School of Medicine, Dartmouth (M.D., 1974), and the University of California, San Francisco (M.A. and Ph.D., 1993).

== See also ==
- Futile medical care
