= Claire Williams Bridgwater =

American forestry scientist (born 1957)

- Born: July 13, 1957 (age 69); Windsor, North Carolina, U.S.
- Occupation: Forestry scientist
- Awards: Guggenheim Fellowship (2002)

Academic background
- Education: North Carolina State University (BS, MS, PhD); University of North Carolina at Chapel Hill (MA)
- Thesis: Early genetic testing for loblolly pine (pinus taeda l.) growth traits (1986)

Academic work
- Discipline: Forestry science
- Institutions: Texas A&M University; American University; Weyerhaeuser

Claire Grace Williams Bridgwater (born July 13, 1957) is an American forestry scientist. A former full professor at Texas A&M University, she is Research Professor-in-Residence at the American University College of Arts and Sciences. A 2002 Guggenheim Fellow, she has authored three books, including Conifer Reproductive Biology (2009), and over a hundred articles.

== Biography ==
Williams was born on July 13, 1957, in Windsor, North Carolina. She attended North Carolina State University where she obtained a BS in 1978, an MS in 1980, and a PhD in forestry in 1986, as well as Guilford College. Her doctoral dissertation was Early genetic testing for loblolly pine (pinus taeda l.) growth traits. In 2021, she obtained her MA in Global Studies from University of North Carolina at Chapel Hill.

In 1987, she worked as a postdoctoral fellow at Duke University. She returned to NCSU as a visiting assistant professor of botany and genetics, serving from 1993 to 1995. In 1995, she joined Texas A&M University as an associate professor of genetics and forestry, and was promoted to full professor in 2001; she eventually received tenure from Texas A&M. She was a 1995 Dr. Lee Senior Visiting Fellow at Christ Church, Oxford, a 2000 Bullard Fellow at Harvard University, and a 2002 Senior Fulbright Scholar at the University of British Columbia. She eventually became a research professor-in-residence at American University.

She has authored three books and over a hundred articles, including on conifer genetics. In 2002, she was awarded a Guggenheim Fellowship "for a study of ecological, evolutionary, and population genomics of conifers". In May 2009, she authored the book Conifer Reproductive Biology.

Outside of academia, she has worked for the research and development department of Weyerhaeuser, as well as United States Department of State's Bureau of European and Eurasian Affairs (namely as a science advisor). In February 2024, she wrote an advice article on entry-level faculty job interviews for Inside Higher Ed.
