= Jillian Murray =

American actress (born 1984)

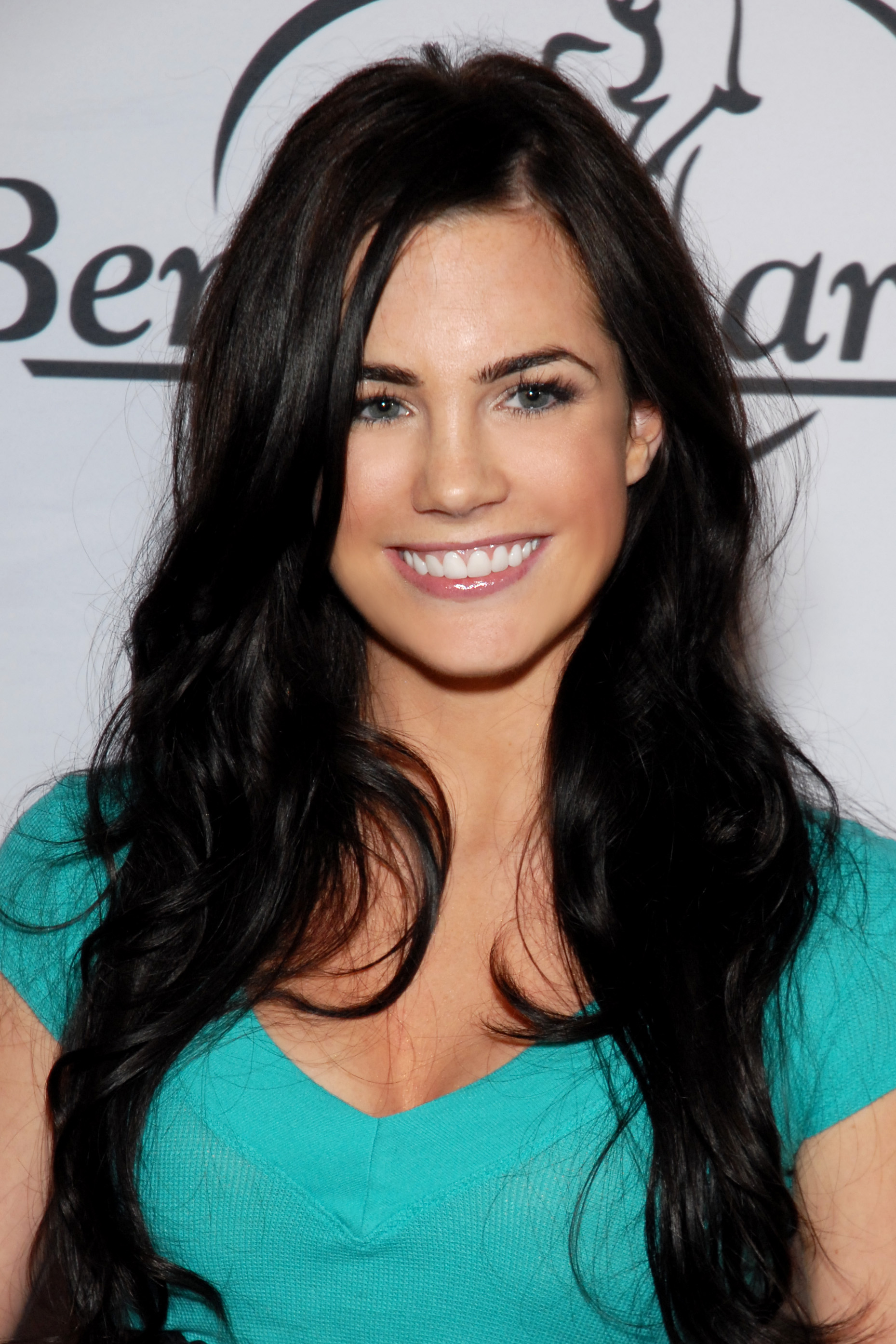
- Jillian Murray attending the Benchwarmer Valentines Party at Area, Hollywood, California, on December 12, 2008
- Born: June 4, 1984 (age 42); Reading, Pennsylvania, U.S.
- Occupations: Actress and model
- Years active: 2003–present
- Spouse: Dean Geyer (m. 2017)
- Children: 1

Jillian Murray (born June 4, 1984) is an American actress. She is known for her roles as Portlyn on Sonny with a Chance, Olivia on MTV's Awkward, Gwen Adams in American High School, Lex Mitchell in Forget Me Not, Brandi Cox in Wild Things: Foursome, and as the body model for Dr. Liara T'Soni for the Mass Effect video game series. She played Dr. Heather Pinkney in the first two seasons of the CBS medical drama Code Black.

== Early life ==
Murray was born in Reading, Pennsylvania, and grew up in Wyomissing in Berks County, Pennsylvania. In 1998, she and her parents moved to Tucson, Arizona; Murray later relocated to Los Angeles to pursue a career in film.

== Career ==
Murray made her film debut in the 2003 independent film Deep Toad as Natashia. She was later cast in Fifty Pills as Jayne, followed by Legacy, also known as Pretty Little Devils. Her first leading role was in The Fun Park, a 2007 indie horror flick, playing a mentally unstable girl.

In 2009, Murray portrayed Gwen Adams in the romantic comedy American High School. She later played Heather in the spoof comedy An American Carol, Abby Graves in the cult horror The Graves, and Lex Mitchell in Forget Me Not.

Murray starred in a recurring role on the Disney Channel original series Sonny with a Chance, playing Portlyn. She was offered a series regular role after the 4th episode but declined due to many film offers on the table. She landed the lead female role in the comedy Cougar Hunting playing Penelope (Lara Flynn Boyle's daughter), as well as the female lead in her first studio film in Wild Things: Foursome playing Brandi Cox. After wrapping that film in 2010 she was offered the lead female in her second studio film Never Back Down 2: The Beatdown playing Eve. This film is where she met her longtime boyfriend Dean Geyer.

Murray's face and body were used as the model for the character of Liara T'Soni in the Mass Effect franchise of video games. She appeared in the premiere episode of the 2011 revival of the reality series Fear Factor (where she came in second place and lost the first place title because her partner fell).

In 2012, Murray starred alongside Danny Trejo and Ron Perlman in the action film Bad Ass, and was cast in the horror film Cabin Fever: Patient Zero. She also produced her first film, Visible Scars, and starred in the film alongside Tom Sizemore. She landed a role on MTV's hit show Awkward playing Olivia. In 2013 she landed numerous indie flicks including Mantervention, Windsor Drive, and My Favorite Five. At the end of 2013, she played the female lead in a golf drama titled The Squeeze alongside Jeremy Sumpter, Christopher McDonald and Michael Nouri. In 2014 Murray was cast as Danni, one of the leads in the film Dark Ascension (originally titled Welcome to Purgatory).

In 2015, Murray was cast in the recurring role of Dr. Heather Pinkney on CBS's Code Black; in summer 2016 she was promoted to series regular for the show's second season.

== Personal life ==
In 2010, Murray began dating Australian singer and actor Dean Geyer. The couple announced their engagement on December 18, 2016. They were married on September 14, 2017. On April 2026, the couple were expecting their first child together and a few months later on July 4, she gave birth to a boy.

== Filmography ==
=== Film ===
Year	Title	Role	Notes
2003	Deep Toad	Natashia	Uncredited
2005	Fifty Pills	Jayne	
2005	One Night With You	Brianna	
2006	The Fun Park	Megan Davis	Direct-to-video film
2008	Legacy	Megan Woods	Direct-to-video film; also known as Pretty Little Devils
2008	An American Carol	Heather	
2009	American High School	Gwen Adams	Direct-to-video film
2009	Knuckle Draggers	Amy	also known as Alpha Males Experiment
2009	Forget Me Not	Lex Mitchell	
2009	The Graves	Abby Graves	
2010	Wild Things: Foursome	Brandi Cox	Direct-to-video film
2011	Never Back Down 2: The Beatdown	Eve	
2011	Cougar Hunting	Penelope	
2012	Bad Ass	Lindsay	
2012	Visible Scars	Stacy	
2014	Cabin Fever: Patient Zero	Penny	
2014	Mantervention	Madisyn	
2015	My Favorite Five	Shelly	
2015	The Squeeze	Natalie	
2015	Windsor Drive	Jordana	
2019	A Kiss on the Candy Lane	Jennifer Monroe	Direct-to-video film
2022	A Brush With Christmas	Charlotte	
2022	An unlikely angel	Janie	
2023	Christmas Keepsake	Elizabeth	

=== Television ===
Year	Title	Role	Notes
2006	Drake & Josh	Drake's Girl / Cute Girl	Episodes: "The Great Doheny", "I Love Sushi"
2007	Cheerleader Camp	Georgie	Television movie
2009	Sonny with a Chance	Portlyn	4 episodes
2010	Rules of Engagement	Young Woman	Episode: "Little Bummer Boy"
2010	The Jace Hall Show	Herself	Episodes: "It's All About the 'V'", "Ice-T, Coco and StarCraft 2"
2011	Awkward.	Olivia [Jenna Plus]	Episode: "Jenna Lives"
2011	Fear Factor	Herself	Contestant; episode: "Broken Hearts & Blood Baths"
2015	Down Dog	Ms. Berndhardt	Unsold television pilot (Amazon Prime)
2015	Murder in the First	Suzy Q	3 episodes
2015–2017	Code Black	Dr. Heather Pinkney	Recurring role (season 1); main role (season 2)
2018	A Dangerous Date	Alexis	Television movie
2019	Prescription for Love	Claire Abbott	Television movie
2020	Killer Daddy Issues	Carrie	Television movie; also known as Overlook
2021	Christmas in the Pines	Ariel Colt	Television movie
2026	9-1-1	Jane Williams	Episode: "Secrets"

=== Video games ===
Year	Title	Role	Notes
2007	Mass Effect	Dr. Liara T'Soni	Body model
2010	Mass Effect 2	Dr. Liara T'Soni	Body model
2012	Mass Effect 3	Dr. Liara T'Soni	Body model
