= Randy Wray =

American painter and sculptor (born 1965)

Randy Wray (born 1965) is an American painter and sculptor who makes use of found objects and recycled materials. His work frequently blurs the boundaries between abstract and representational art.

Wray was born in Reidsville, North Carolina. He attended high school at University of North Carolina School of the Arts before receiving his Bachelor of Fine Arts from the Maryland Institute College of Art.

Wray has exhibited at a wide range of venues, such as Karma, Lo Brutto Stahl, White Columns, 15 Orient, MAMOTH, Derek Eller Gallery, MoMA PS1, the Socrates Sculpture Park, and the Marie Walsh Sharpe Foundation. His work is in the permanent collections of the Art Institute of Chicago and the Weatherspoon Art Museum. His awards include a Guggenheim Fellowship, a New York Foundation for the Arts Painting Fellowship, a Lillian Orlowsky and William Freed Grant, and the inaugural Irving Sandler Prize.
