= Anna Biani =

Georgian actress

Anna Luca Biani
- Born: Ana Giorgobiani; April 1, 1991 (age 34); Tbilisi, Republic of Georgia, Soviet Union
- Occupation(s): Actor, filmmaker
- Years active: 1998–present
- Website: www.annabiani.com

Anna Luca Biani (Georgian: ანა ლუკა ბიანი; born April 1, 1991 as Ana Giorgobiani; Georgian: ანა გიორგობიანი), also known by their stage name Anna Gurji (Georgian: ანა გურჯი), is an American actor. They first appeared in film as a child, in a short documentary named Town (1998). They made their dramatic debut in the short drama-film If This Day Never Happened (2006). Biani then gained the lead role as an 18th-century violinist named Cinka Panna, in Slovak-Hungarian feature film Cinka Panna, directed by Dusan Rapos.

== Biography and career ==
Anna “Luca” Biani is a genderfluid actor from Tbilisi, Georgia, based in Los Angeles, CA, and goes by they/them pronouns. Luca began their acting career at the age of 6, appearing in a number of commercials, as well as a documentary. At the age of 14 Luca landed their first big role as a lead actor in the 2006 short film called If This Day Never Happened, directed by their sister Khatuna Giorgobiani.

Two years later, Biani was cast as the leading role in the historical feature film Cinka Panna, where they played the 18th century Hungarian gypsy violinist Panna Czinka. The film went on to win a Golden Palm Award at the 2009 Mexico International Film Festival.

Since then, Luca has acted in theater plays, improv comedy performances, and a series of films including Freaky Deaky, Windsor Drive and Sacred Blood.

Biani appeared in Innocence of Muslims, a short film uploaded to YouTube in 2012, to which anti-Islamic content was added in post-production, without the actors' knowledge; Biani has expressed shock about this.

== Filmography ==
- G4
- Sacred Blood (2015)
- Windsor Drive (2015)
- Kessler’s Lab
- Freaky Deaky (2012)
- Loverly (2011)
- Christmas Eve. (2010)
- Memorias del desarrollo (2010)
- Sendpoint (2009)
- Cinka Panna (2008)
- If This Day Never Happened (2006)
- Town (1998)
