= Jonathan L. Rosner =

Theoretical physicist

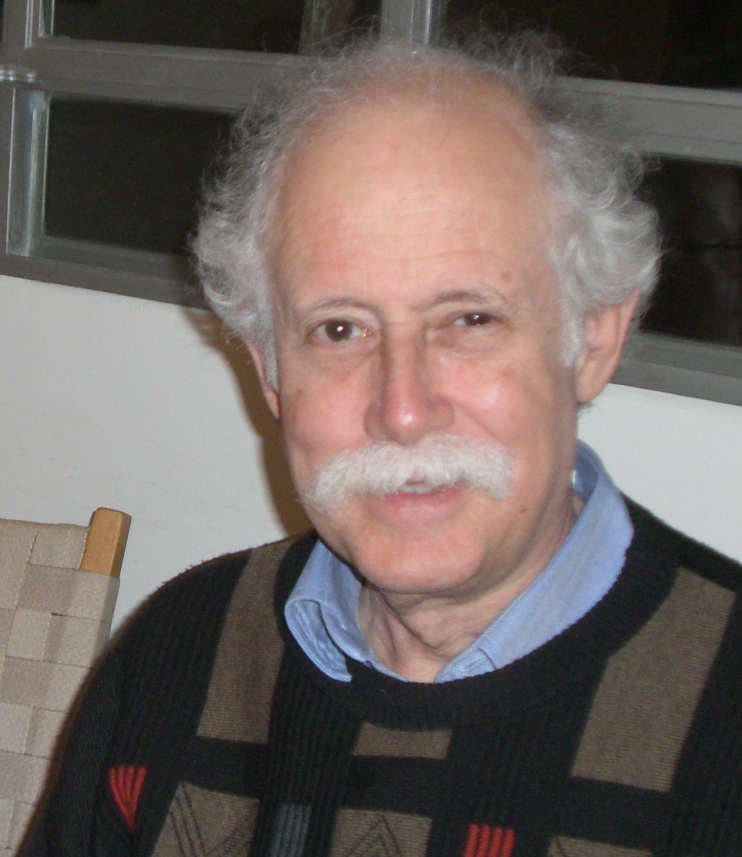
- Jonathan Lincoln Rosner
- Born: Jonathan L. Rosner; 1941; New York City, NY
- Died: May 24, 2025 (aged 83–84)
- Education: Princeton University
- Known for: Particle Physics
- Scientific career
- Fields: Physics
- Workplaces: University of Chicago
- Doctoral advisor: Sam Treiman

Jonathan L. Rosner was a theoretical physicist known for his contributions to the field of particle physics, particularly in the areas of the Standard Model and quark dynamics.

== Personal life ==
Jonathan Rosner was born in New York City in 1941 and grew up in Yonkers, New York, son of Albert Aaron and Elsie Augustine (Lincoln) Rosner.

His wife Joy, whom he married in 1965, is a handweaver. They have two children: Hannah (b. 1969) and Benjamin (b. 1979).

== Education ==
Jonathan attended Roosevelt High School. He received his Bachelor of Arts in Physics from Swarthmore College in 1962 and his PhD in Physics from Princeton University in 1965 with Sam Treiman serving as his doctoral advisor.

== Career ==
After receiving his PhD, Rosner was a Research Assistant Professor at the University of Washington from 1965 to 1967 and a Visiting Lecturer at Tel Aviv University from 1967 to 1969. He served on the faculty of the University of Minnesota from 1969 until 1982, when he became a professor in the Department of Physics at the University of Chicago and part of the Enrico Fermi Institute. He retired in 2011, but remained with the University of Chicago as a professor emeritus until his death in 2025.

Rosner worked on a wide range of topics within particle physics. He was best known for his work on the interactions and properties of quarks and leptons in the Standard Model and in physics beyond the Standard Model. His contributions to the field included the 1969 paper "Graphical Form of Duality," in which he demonstrated that the duality between hadronic s-channel scattering and t-channel exchanges could be understood graphically, and the 1974 paper "Search for Charm" authored with Mary K. Gaillard and Benjamin W. Lee, in which he and his co-authors predicted the properties of hadronic states containing charm quarks.

Rosner also made contributions to the understanding of the spectra and decay processes of mesons and baryons and to the understanding of the strong force through his work on quarkonium systems. In his later years, he focused on the study of tetraquarks and pentaquarks. In addition to his theoretical work, Rosner also actively engaged with experiments and had a long association with the CLEO experiment at Cornell University.

== Honors and awards ==
- Alfred P. Sloan Foundation Fellowship (1971)
- American Physical Society Fellowship in the Division of Particles and Fields (1980)
- University of Chicago Graduate Teaching Award (1996)
- John Simon Guggenheim Foundation Fellowship (2002)
