= Rebecca Baron =

American experimental filmmaker and media artist (born 1968)

- Born: 1968 (age 57–58); Baltimore, Maryland, U.S.
- Education: Brown University (BA); University of California, San Diego (MFA)
- Occupations: Filmmaker, media artist, educator
- Employer: California Institute of the Arts
- Known for: The Idea of North (1995), okay bye-bye (1998), How Little We Know of Our Neighbours (2005), Lossless (2008), Detour de Force (2014)
- Awards: Guggenheim Fellowship (2002)
- Website: rebeccabaron.com

Rebecca Baron (born 1968) is an American experimental filmmaker and media artist whose work examines the construction of history through photography, archival materials, and moving images. Her films include The Idea of North (1995), okay bye-bye (1998), How Little We Know of Our Neighbours (2005), and Detour de Force (2014). With media artist Douglas Goodwin she created the Lossless series (2008) and Nearest Neighbor (2023).

Baron's work has been presented at the Whitney Biennial, the New York Film Festival, the International Film Festival Rotterdam, the Toronto International Film Festival, and other festivals and museums. The Austrian Film Museum presented the first retrospective of her films in 2010. She received a Guggenheim Fellowship in 2002 and was a fellow at the Radcliffe Institute for Advanced Study in 2007–08.

Film scholars including Laura Rascaroli, Jaimie Baron, and Jihoon Kim have discussed her work in relation to the essay film, archival practice, and the materiality of digital images.

== Early life and education ==
Baron was born in Baltimore, Maryland, in 1968. She received a BA in Art-Semiotics from Brown University and an MFA in Visual Arts from the University of California, San Diego.

After moving to New York, Baron worked at Pennebaker Associates, the production company of documentary filmmakers D. A. Pennebaker and Chris Hegedus. She was an assistant editor and researcher on their documentary The War Room (1993). During this period she made her first film, The Idea of North, which she completed in 1995.

Baron joined the faculty of the California Institute of the Arts in 2000, where she has taught documentary and experimental film. She has also taught at the Massachusetts College of Art and Design and Harvard University.

== Work ==
=== The Idea of North and okay bye-bye ===
Baron's early films use photographs and other surviving records to examine the difficulty of reconstructing historical events.

The Idea of North (1995), a 14-minute 16mm film, concerns the failed 1897 Arctic balloon expedition led by Swedish explorer S. A. Andrée. Using photographs recovered decades later with the remains and diaries of the expedition members, the film juxtaposes photographic stillness, cinematic time, and historical narration. It received a Silver Spire award at the 1996 San Francisco International Film Festival and was presented in the Views from the Avant-Garde program at the 1997 New York Film Festival.

Film scholar Laura Rascaroli uses The Idea of North as a principal case study in How the Essay Film Thinks (2017). In a chapter examining narration and argumentation in the essay film, Rascaroli pairs Nguyễn Trinh Thi's Letters from Panduranga as an example of the epistolary essay with Baron's film as her case study of lyricism as counternarration.

Baron's next film, okay bye-bye (1998), began with a discarded scrap of Super 8 film found on a San Diego sidewalk showing an unidentified Cambodian man. Told through a series of unsent letters, the 39-minute film expands from this fragment into an investigation of Cambodia under the Khmer Rouge and of the photographs of prisoners made at the Tuol Sleng prison. Rather than treating archival images as transparent evidence of historical events, the film considers the limits of what can be recovered or understood from them.

Jaimie Baron discusses okay bye-bye in The Archive Effect: Found Footage and the Audiovisual Experience of History (2014), in her account of the affective relationship between archival documents, historical events, and contemporary spectators.

Baron was included in the 2000 Whitney Biennial, where okay bye-bye was shown.

=== How Little We Know of Our Neighbours ===
How Little We Know of Our Neighbours (2005), a 49-minute video, examines the British Mass-Observation movement, founded in the 1930s to record everyday British life through diaries, surveys, observation, and photography. The film places Mass-Observation's practices alongside the history of portable cameras and contemporary surveillance. Baron wrote about the movement's history in Cabinet in 2004, while the film was in production.

The Harvard Film Archive described the film as tracing the changing function of the camera in public space, and "how technology easily shifts between being a tool of authoritarianism, art, voyeurism, entertainment and commerce". The film had its European premiere at the International Film Festival Rotterdam in 2006, and was shown with The Idea of North and okay bye-bye in the Harvard Film Archive's 2007 program Past Image Present: An Evening with Rebecca Baron.

Across these films, Baron's use of archival materials differs from conventional historical documentary, in which images serve primarily as evidence marshaled to support a narrative. Writing for the School of the Art Institute of Chicago's Conversations at the Edge series, Lindsay Bosch argued that Baron's films instead direct attention toward the ambiguity and material character of the archival records themselves.

=== Lossless ===
In 2008, Baron began collaborating with Douglas Goodwin on Lossless, a series of works made by manipulating the data underlying compressed digital copies of existing films. Rather than editing the films conventionally, Baron and Goodwin removed or altered the information that video compression algorithms use to reconstruct images between key frames. The resulting works retain recognizable movements and compositions while figures and backgrounds dissolve, smear, or merge across successive frames.

The series includes interventions into Maya Deren's Meshes of the Afternoon (Lossless #2) and John Ford's The Searchers (Lossless #3). Baron and Goodwin described the project in a chapter, "The Rest is Noise: On Lossless", in the edited volume On Not Looking: The Paradox of Contemporary Visual Culture (2015).

Jaimie Baron discusses Lossless in The Archive Effect as an example of what she terms the "digital archive effect", in which the structure and instability of the digital image itself become perceptible. Jihoon Kim subsequently analyzed Lossless #2 and Lossless #3 in Between Film, Video, and the Digital: Hybrid Moving Images in the Post-Media Age (2016), placing the works within experimental practices concerned with digital glitch, compression, and media materiality.

The Austrian Film Museum characterized Lossless as "a new area of study" in Baron's work, in which "the historical transformation of film itself" became the object of investigation. In December 2010, the museum presented Lossless alongside her earlier films in the first retrospective devoted to her work. Lossless was also shown as an installation in the Sert Gallery at Harvard's Carpenter Center for the Visual Arts.

=== Detour de Force ===
Detour de Force (2014), a 29-minute 16mm film, concerns Ted Serios, a Chicago bellhop who became known in the 1960s for claiming that he could produce images on Polaroid film through mental projection. Baron constructed the film from archival 16mm footage, audio recordings, photographs, and other documentation of experiments conducted with Serios by the psychiatrist Jule Eisenbud.

Rather than resolving whether Serios's photographs were genuine or fraudulent, the film concentrates on the acts of recording, observation, and belief surrounding the experiments. Writing for the International Documentary Association, Akiva Gottlieb placed Detour de Force within a broader development in experimental archival filmmaking in which archival material is not treated simply as evidence for a predetermined historical argument.

The film premiered in the Wavelengths program at the 2014 Toronto International Film Festival. It was subsequently presented in a 2015 program devoted to Baron's work at the School of the Art Institute of Chicago's Conversations at the Edge and at the Harvard Film Archive in December 2015.

=== Nearest Neighbor ===
Nearest Neighbor (2023), Baron's second collaboration with Goodwin, is a 22-minute video concerning machine learning tools used to identify birds and interpret birdsong. The film applies artificial intelligence systems to ornithology, producing what the festival Visions du Réel described as "unlikely and absurdly comical scenarios" that raise the question of how far people will go in inventing tools to replace their own understanding of the world. It had its world premiere in the International Medium Length & Short Film Competition at Visions du Réel in 2023, was named an honorable mention in Film Comment's survey of the best short films of 2023, and had its Chicago debut at the Block Museum of Art later that year.

== Themes and critical reception ==
A recurring concern in Baron's work is the unstable relationship between an image and the event or object it appears to document. Her films frequently begin with photographic or cinematic records but direct attention toward what those records omit, distort, or make impossible to recover.

In presenting its 2010 retrospective, the Austrian Film Museum identified as a unifying feature of Baron's work her "engagement with the fault-lines of memory and history" and with the media through which they are constructed. The program connected the recovered expedition photographs of The Idea of North, the unidentified Cambodian footage of okay bye-bye, the surveillance practices examined in How Little We Know of Our Neighbours, and the digital transformations of Lossless.

Scholars have approached Baron's films from several overlapping fields. Rascaroli treats The Idea of North as an example of lyric argumentation within the essay-film tradition; Jaimie Baron considers okay bye-bye and Lossless in developing her account of the "archive effect"; and Kim examines Lossless in relation to the materiality of digital moving images.

Baron's work also repeatedly examines the status of photographic evidence. The Idea of North asks what can be known from photographs left by people who did not survive; How Little We Know of Our Neighbours examines photography as observation and surveillance; and Detour de Force turns to photographs whose disputed means of production make the question of evidence itself their subject.

In 2023, the Block Museum of Art at Northwestern University presented Rebecca Baron and Douglas Goodwin: Artifacts, a program bringing together work from their collaboration and their individual practices. The museum described the works as looking "quizzically at imaging technologies and their shaky claims to reality". The program included Lossless #3, Detour de Force, Goodwin's Artifact #1, and the Chicago debut of Baron and Goodwin's Nearest Neighbor (2023), a work involving machine learning and bird imagery.

== Recognition ==
Baron was included in the 2000 Whitney Biennial. Her films have screened at the New York Film Festival, the International Film Festival Rotterdam, the Toronto International Film Festival, the London Film Festival, the Viennale, Anthology Film Archives, the Pacific Film Archive, the Flaherty Film Seminar, and documenta 12.

She received a Guggenheim Fellowship in film in 2002. In 2007–08 she was the David and Roberta Logie Fellow and a Radcliffe–Harvard Film Study Center Fellow at the Radcliffe Institute for Advanced Study, where she worked on What Nature Tells Us, a cycle of 16mm films on navigation.

The Austrian Film Museum presented the first retrospective of Baron's films in December 2010.

== Selected filmography ==
- The Idea of North (1995), 16mm, 14 min.
- okay bye-bye (1998), 16mm, 39 min.
- How Little We Know of Our Neighbours (2005), video, 49 min.
- Lossless #2, #3, #4, and #5 (2008), with Douglas Goodwin, video
- Poverty Housing. Americus, Georgia (2008), with Dorit Margreiter
- Detour de Force (2014), 16mm, 29 min.
- Nearest Neighbor (2023), with Douglas Goodwin, video, 23 min.
