= Xinsheng Ling =

Xinsheng Sean Ling
- 凌新生 (Ling Xinsheng)
- Born: February 15, 1964 (age 62)
- Citizenship: United States
- Education: Wuhan University; University of Chinese Academy of Sciences; University of Connecticut; Yale University
- Known for: Condensed matter physics; Superconductivity; Biophysics
- Awards: Sloan Fellowship; Guggenheim Fellowship; Fellow of the American Physical Society
- Scientific career
- Fields: Condensed matter physics Physics
- Workplaces: Brown University; Yale University
- Website: vivo.brown.edu/display/xling

Xinsheng Sean Ling (Chinese: 凌新生; pinyin: Líng Xīnshēng; born February 15, 1964) is a Chinese-American physicist and professor at Brown University. He is known for his work in condensed matter, in particular for his contributions to superconductivity, vortex physics, colloid physics, biophysics, and quantum physics. He joined the faculty of Brown University in 1996.

== Biography and career ==
Ling graduated from Wuhan University in 1984. He earned his M.S. from the University of Chinese Academy of Sciences in 1987 and his Ph.D. from the University of Connecticut in 1992.

He has done postdoctoral research at Yale University and the NEC Research Institute. In 1998 and 2002, he was named an Alfred P. Sloan Fellow and Guggenheim Fellow respectively. He has been a Fellow of the American Physical Society since 2005. His research areas include quantum physics of matter, colloid physics, and nanobiophysics.
