= Louise Beach =

American composer (born 1955)

- Born: September 29, 1955 (age 70); Wilmington, Delaware, U.S.
- Education: Wesleyan University; State University of New York at Purchase; BMI Lehman Engel Musical Theatre Workshop
- Occupation: Composer
- Employer: State University of New York at Purchase
- Awards: Guggenheim Fellowship (2002)
- Musical career
- Genres: Contemporary music; musical theater

Louise Beach (born September 29, 1955) is an American composer who has worked in contemporary music and musical theater. Originally working at the State University of New York at Purchase, she won the 1995 National Association of Teachers of Singing Art Song Composition Award and is a 2002 Guggenheim Fellow, and she was composer of the musicals The Morini Strad and Sabina.

== Biography ==
Louise Beach was born on September 29, 1955, in Wilmington, Delaware, and obtained her BA (1977) from Wesleyan University. She later joined the State University of New York at Purchase faculty as a faculty musician, and her 1982 piece "Daffodil", which she composed for the SUNY Purchase Dance Corps, was praised by Georgette Gouveia for "underlin[ing] the way the choreography unfolds". She also taught at the Centre Internationale de la Danse de Paris, Florida State University, Sarah Lawrence College, and the University of Utah. She won the 1995 National Association of Teachers of Singing Art Song Composition Award for her composition Songs of Dusk.

After obtaining her MFA (1996) in Composition from the SUNY Purchase Conservatory, Beach studied with the BMI Lehman Engel Musical Theatre Workshop and worked with the New Dramatists Composer Librettist Studio. Other compositions she completed include Sonata for Violin and Piano (1997) and Wondrous Love (2002), and she and Polly Waterfield co-arranged O Shenandoah! And Other Songs from the New World, a viola education book aimed at children.

In 2002, Beach was awarded a Guggenheim Fellowship in music composition. She was composer for the Willy Holtzman musical The Morini Strad; Alice T. Carter of the Pittsburgh Tribune-Review commended her role in the play's 2010 world premiere at the City Theatre in Pittsburgh for "augment[ing] the ambiance with original musical interludes that create bridges and background". She was also the composer for Sabina, a musical on psychoanalyst Sabina Spielrein; Carla Maria Verdino-Süllwold of BroadwayWorld praised the "dark, sometimes chromatic harmonies" of Beach's score but criticized its musical dullness.

Beach was based in Pleasantville, New York as of 2003.
