= Stephen Kern =

American cultural historian

Stephen Kern is an American cultural historian and Honorary Distinguished Professor of History at Ohio State University whose research explores modernism. His books include The Culture of Time and Space, 1880–1918 (1983), which examined how technological change reshaped perceptions of temporality and spatiality before and during World War I.

== Career ==
Kern taught at Northern Illinois University, where he became Distinguished Research Professor, before moving to Ohio State in 2002. He was appointed Humanities Distinguished Professor there in 2004. He has received fellowships from the American Council of Learned Societies, the National Endowment for the Humanities, the Rockefeller Foundation, and the Guggenheim Foundation, and won the Ohio Academy of History Distinguished Historian Award in 2007.

== Work ==
Kern's first book, Anatomy and Destiny (1975), was a cultural history of the human body. His book The Culture of Time and Space, 1880–1918, argued that technologies like the telephone, cinema, automobile, and the airplane, together with developments such as Cubism, psychoanalysis, and relativity theory, produced fundamentally new modes of thinking about and experiencing time and space. Harvard University Press reissued it in 2003 with a new preface.

Subsequent works examined the history of encounter or love (The Culture of Love, 1992), the gaze in English and French painting and fiction (Eyes of Love, 1996), and changing ideas about causality since 1830, using murder novels as a case study (A Cultural History of Causality, 2004). The Modernist Novel (2011) offered a formalist analysis of narrative innovation in Conrad, Joyce, Woolf, Proust, Kafka, and others; Jon Hegglund, reviewing it in Studies in the Novel, called it a welcome counterbalance to scholarship that had become reluctant to discuss modernist form. Modernism After the Death of God (2017) argued that key modernist figures — Nietzsche, Joyce, Freud, Lawrence, Gide, Heidegger, and Woolf — turned against Christianity partly over its sexual morality and then built alternative unifying projects.

Kern's 2025 book Time and Space in the Internet Age is a sequel to The Culture of Time and Space, comparing two periods of technological upheaval: 1880–1920 and 1980–2020. His book Origins and Foundations in the Modernist Age, is forthcoming from Edinburgh University Press.

== Selected works ==
- Anatomy and Destiny: A Cultural History of the Human Body (Bobbs-Merrill, 1975)
- The Culture of Time and Space, 1880–1918 (Harvard University Press, 1983; 2nd ed. 2003)
- The Culture of Love: Victorians to Moderns (Harvard University Press, 1992)
- Eyes of Love: The Gaze in English and French Paintings and Novels (Reaktion Books, 1996)
- A Cultural History of Causality: Science, Murder Novels, and Systems of Thought (Princeton University Press, 2004)
- The Modernist Novel: A Critical Introduction (Cambridge University Press, 2011)
- Modernism After the Death of God: Christianity, Fragmentation, and Unification (Routledge, 2017)
- Time and Space in the Internet Age (Routledge, 2025)
