= Behavioural Pharmacology (journal) =

- Discipline: Behavioral pharmacology
- Language: English
- Edited by: Bart Ellenbroek

Publication details
- History: 1989–present
- Publisher: Lippincott Williams & Wilkins
- Frequency: 8/year
- Impact factor: 2.293 (2020)

Standard abbreviations
- ISO 4: Behav. Pharmacol.

Indexing
- CODEN: BPHAEL
- ISSN: 0955-8810 (print); 1473-5849 (web)
- OCLC no.: 22170289

Links
- Journal homepage; Online access; Online archive

Behavioural Pharmacology is a peer-reviewed scientific journal covering the effects of biological active compounds on behaviour in animals, including humans. It is published by Lippincott Williams & Wilkins and the current editor-in-chief is professor Bart Ellenbroek (Victoria University of Wellington).

== Abstracting and indexing ==
The journal is abstracted and indexed in:

- CASSI
- Science Citation Index
- Current Contents/Life Sciences
- BIOSIS Previews
- Index Medicus/MEDLINE/PubMed
- PsycINFO
- Scopus

According to the Journal Citation Reports, the journal has a 2014 impact factor of 2.148.
