= John Stewart Muller =

American film director

- Born: Washington D.C., United States
- Occupations: film director, producer, screenwriter

John Stewart Muller is an American motion picture and television commercial director, screenwriter, and producer.

== Biography ==
Muller was born in Washington, D.C., and raised in Kansas City, Missouri, where he attended the Pembroke Hill School before moving to Los Angeles to study film at Loyola Marymount University. He began making films at the age of seven. A founding partner of Steele Films in 2000, Muller shifted his focus to feature-length motion pictures after eight years directing television commercials, completing a number of original screenplays with his producer, Laura Boersma. Muller and Boersma currently run Granfalloon Productions, the award-winning Santa Monica production company, specializing in commercial production, promos, and branded content for clients such as Mattel, Coors Light, Fox Sports, A&E, MasterCard, Starz, Buick, GSN, AEG, Nickelodeon, HGTV, MovieTickets.com, and more.

Most recently, Muller directed and co-wrote (with Boersma) the psychological thriller Indiscretion, the story of a politician’s wife whose brief affair with an alluring young sculptor leads to a dangerous obsession. Indiscretion stars Academy Award winner Mira Sorvino, Cary Elwes, Christopher Backus, Katherine McNamara, and Melora Walters. Its world broadcast premiere was July 23, 2016, on Lifetime.

His debut feature, Fling (internationally titled Lie to Me), premiered to a sold-out crowd at the Newport Beach Film Festival on April 26, 2008, and received the award for "Outstanding Achievement in Filmmaking" by the festival's jury. Fling had its official Los Angeles Premiere on October 18, 2008, at the Fine Arts Theatre on Wilshire Boulevard as part of the 2008 LA Femme Film Festival. It had its East Coast premiere on November 7, 2008, at the Fort Lauderdale International Film Festival followed shortly thereafter by its Midwest premiere and limited theatrical release on November 14, 2008, at the Screenland Theatre in the Crossroads, Kansas City. Fling had its international premiere at the Bahamas International Film Festival on December 5, 2008. The film was distributed in North America by Peace Arch Entertainment, released on March 24, 2009.

Muller directed and co-wrote episodes for BlackBoxTV, the premium YouTube channel of Anthony E. Zuiker, creator of the CSI franchise. He sold a comedy series, Loving the Single Man, to Michael Eisner’s new media company, Vuguru. His award-winning documentary series for Buick and the NCAA featured world-renowned athletes like Alan Page and Tamika Catchings and aired on sports networks nationwide. He also directed an episode of UPROXX and Woven Digital's documentary series Uncharted on DJ Tyley Marenyi, AKA NGHTMRE.

Muller is currently in development on a number of other feature films and episodic series. He also supports various donkey rescue centers across the United States.

== Filmography ==
=== Feature films ===
- Indiscretion (2016)
- Fling (2008)
- Static (2003)
- These Angels Are Cruel (2001)
- ISSUES (1999)

=== Short films ===
- Last Halloween (2011)
- bunnies (2010)
- Pulverize Hesitation: The Graphic Art of John D. Muller (2010)
- lullaby (1997)

=== Series ===
- School Nurse (2015)
- Uncharted (2015)
- BlackBoxTV (2012)
- The Buick Human Highlight Reel (2011-2013)
- Loving the Single Man (2010)
