= List of awards and nominations received by Mira Sorvino =

Mira Sorvino awards and nominations
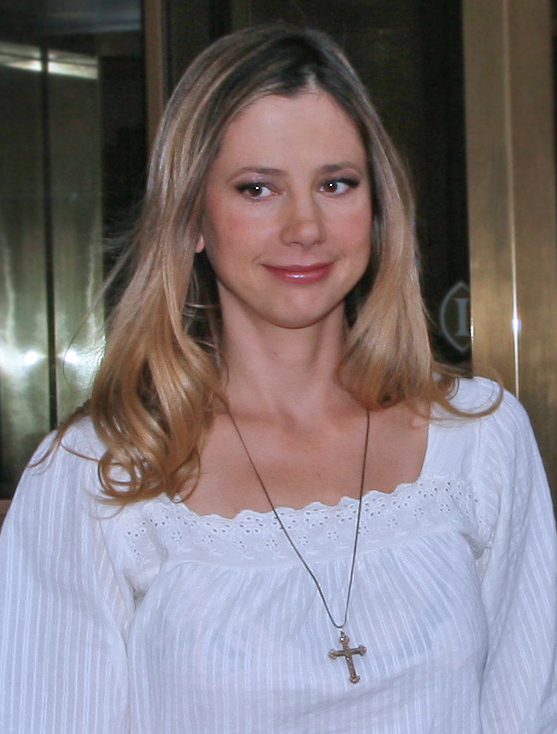
- Sorvino at the 2007 Toronto International Film Festival
Award	Wins	Nominations
Totals
Academy Awards	1	1
Golden Globe Awards	1	3
Primetime Emmy Awards	0	1
BAFTA Awards	0	1
20/20 Awards	0	1
Action on Film International Film Festival	0	1
Awards Circuit Community	0	1
Broadcast Film Critics Association	1	1
Canadian International Faith & Family Film Festival	1	1
Chicago Film Critics Association	0	1
Chlotrudis Society for Independent Film	1	1
Dallas–Fort Worth Film Critics Association	1	1
Giffoni Film Festival	1	1
Gold Derby Awards	0	2
Golden Eagle Awards	0	1
Golden Raspberry Awards	0	1
Hoboken International Film Festival	0	1
Los Angeles Film Critics Association	0	1
Milano International Film Festival	1	2
MTV Movie & TV Awards	0	1
National Board of Review	1	1
National Society of Film Critics	0	1
New York Film Critics Circle	1	1
New York VisionFest	1	1
Oldenburg International Film Festival	1	1
Online Film & Television Association	0	1
Prism Awards	1	1
San Diego International Film Festival	1	1
Saturn Awards	0	1
Screen Actors Guild Awards	0	1
Sonoma International Film Festival	1	1
Southeastern Film Critics Association	1	1
Stinkers Bad Movie Awards	0	1
Taormina Film Fest	1	1
Wins	17
Nominations	38

Mira Sorvino (born September 28, 1967) is an American actress. Throughout the course of her career she has been nominated for several awards for her work on film and television, in particular, for her performance in the 1995 comedy film Mighty Aphrodite, directed by Woody Allen, in which she was the nominee of fifteen awards, winning eight in total − namely, the Academy Award for Best Supporting Actress and the Golden Globe Award for Best Supporting Actress – Motion Picture, while she was also nominated for the BAFTA Award for Best Actress in a Supporting Role and the Screen Actors Guild Award for Outstanding Performance by a Female Actor in a Supporting Role.

== Academy Awards ==
Year	Category	Nominated work	Result	Ref.
1996	Best Supporting Actress	Mighty Aphrodite	Won	

== Golden Globe Awards ==
Year	Category	Nominated work	Result	Ref.
1996	Golden Globe Award for Best Supporting Actress – Motion Picture	Mighty Aphrodite	Won	
1997	Golden Globe Award for Best Actress – Miniseries or Television Film	Norma Jean & Marilyn	Nominated	
2006	Golden Globe Award for Best Actress – Miniseries or Television Film	Human Trafficking	Nominated	

== Primetime Emmy Awards ==
Year	Category	Nominated work	Result	Ref.
1996	Primetime Emmy Award for Outstanding Lead Actress in a Limited Series or Movie	Norma Jean & Marilyn	Nominated	

== BAFTA Awards ==
Year	Category	Nominated work	Result	Ref.
1996	BAFTA Award for Best Actress in a Supporting Role	Mighty Aphrodite	Nominated	

== 20/20 Awards ==
Year	Category	Nominated work	Result	Ref.
2016	Felix Award for Best Supporting Actress	Mighty Aphrodite	Nominated	

== Action On Film International Film Festival ==
Year	Category	Nominated work	Result	Ref.
2016	Action on Film Award for Best Supporting Actress	The Red Maple Leaf	Nominated	

== Awards Circuit Community ==
Year	Category	Nominated work	Result	Ref.
1995	ACCA Award for Best Actress in a Supporting Role	Mighty Aphrodite	Nominated	

== Broadcast Film Critics Association ==
Year	Category	Nominated work	Result	Ref.
1996	Critics' Choice Movie Award for Best Supporting Actress (Note: Known then as the Broadcast Film Critics Association, it is now the Critics' Choice Association.)	Mighty Aphrodite	Won	

== Canadian International Faith & Family Film Festival ==
Year	Category	Nominated work	Result	Ref.
2018	CIFF Award for Best Lead Actress	Trade of Innocents	Won	

== Chicago Film Critics Association ==
Year	Category	Nominated work	Result	Ref.
1996	Chicago Film Critics Association Award for Best Supporting Actress	Mighty Aphrodite	Nominated	

== Chlotrudis Society for Independent Film ==
Year	Category	Nominated work	Result	Ref.
1996	Chlotrudis Award for Best Supporting Actress	Mighty Aphrodite	Won	

== Dallas–Fort Worth Film Critics Association ==
Year	Category	Nominated work	Result	Ref.
1996	Dallas–Fort Worth Film Critics Association Award for Best Supporting Actress	Mighty Aphrodite	Won	

== Giffoni Film Festival ==
Year	Category	Nominated work	Result	Ref.
2013	Giffoni Award	—N/a	Won	

== Gold Derby Awards ==
Year	Category	Nominated work	Result	Ref.
2004	Gold Derby TV Award for Comedy Guest Actress	Will & Grace	Nominated	
2006	Gold Derby TV Award for TV Movie/Mini Lead Actress	Human Trafficking	Nominated	

== Golden Eagle Awards ==
Year	Category	Nominated work	Result	Ref.
2008	Golden Eagle Award for Beat Actress on Television	Leningrad	Nominated	

== Golden Raspberry Awards ==
Year	Category	Nominated work	Result	Ref.
2023	Worst Supporting Actress	Lamborghini: The Man Behind the Legend	Nominated	

== Hoboken International Film Festival ==
Year	Category	Nominated work	Result	Ref.
2017	HIFF Award for Best Supporting Actress	The Red Maple Leaf	Nominated	

== Los Angeles Film Critics Association ==
Year	Category	Nominated work	Result	Ref.
1995	Los Angeles Film Critics Association Award for Best Supporting Actress	Mighty Aphrodite	Nominated	

== Milano International Film Festival ==
Year	Category	Nominated work	Result	Ref.
2013	MIFF Award for Best Actress	Trade of Innocents	Nominated	
2016	MIFF Award for Best Supporting Actress	Mothers and Daughters	Won	

== MTV Movie & TV Awards ==
Year	Category	Nominated work	Result	Ref.
1998	MTV Movie Award for Best Dance Sequence (Note: Shared with Lisa Kudrow and Alan Cumming.)	Romy and Michele's High School Reunion	Nominated	

== National Board of Review ==
Year	Category	Nominated work	Result	Ref.
1995	National Board of Review Award for Best Supporting Actress	Mighty Aphrodite	Won	

== National Society of Film Critics ==
Year	Category	Nominated work	Result	Ref.
1996	National Society of Film Critics Award for Best Supporting Actress	Mighty Aphrodite	Nominated	

== New York Film Critics Circle ==
Year	Category	Nominated work	Result	Ref.
1995	New York Film Critics Circle Award for Best Supporting Actress	Mighty Aphrodite	Won	

== New York VisionFest ==
Year	Category	Nominated work	Result	Ref.
2009	Film Competition Award for Actress (Female Lead)	Like Dandelion Dust	Won	

== Oldenburg International Film Festival ==
Year	Category	Nominated work	Result	Ref.
2012	Walk of Fame	—N/a	Won	

== Online Film & Television Association ==
Year	Category	Nominated work	Result	Ref.
2008	Online Film and Television Award for Best Guest in a Drama Series	House	Nominated	

== Prism Awards ==
Year	Category	Nominated work	Result	Ref.
2015	Prism Award for Performance in a Feature Film	Perfect Sisters	Won	

== San Diego International Film Festival ==
Year	Category	Nominated work	Result	Ref.
2009	SDFF Award for Best Actress	Like Dandelion Dust	Won	
2026	Virtuoso Award	Special Achievement	Honored	

== Saturn Awards ==
Year	Category	Nominated work	Result	Ref.
1998	Saturn Award for Best Actress (Note: The Saturn Awards are distributed by Academy of Science Fiction, Fantasy and Horror Films.)	Mimic	Nominated	

== Screen Actors Guild Awards ==
Year	Category	Nominated work	Result	Ref.
1996	Screen Actors Guild Award for Outstanding Performance by a Female Actor in a Supporting Role	Mighty Aphrodite	Nominated	

== Sonoma International Film Festival ==
Year	Category	Nominated work	Result	Ref.
2009	Jury Award for Best Actress	Like Dandelion Dust	Won	

== Southeastern Film Critics Association ==
Year	Category	Nominated work	Result	Ref.
1996	Southeastern Film Critics Association Award for Best Supporting Actress	Mighty Aphrodite	Won	

== Stinkers Bad Movie Awards ==
Year	Category	Nominated work	Result	Ref.
1998	Stinker Award for Worst On-Screen Couple (Note: Shared with Chow Yun-Fat.)	The Replacement Killers	Nominated	

== Taormina Film Fest ==
Year	Category	Nominated work	Result	Ref.
2004	Taormina Arte Award	—N/a	Won	
