= Michael Rispoli =

American actor (born 1960)

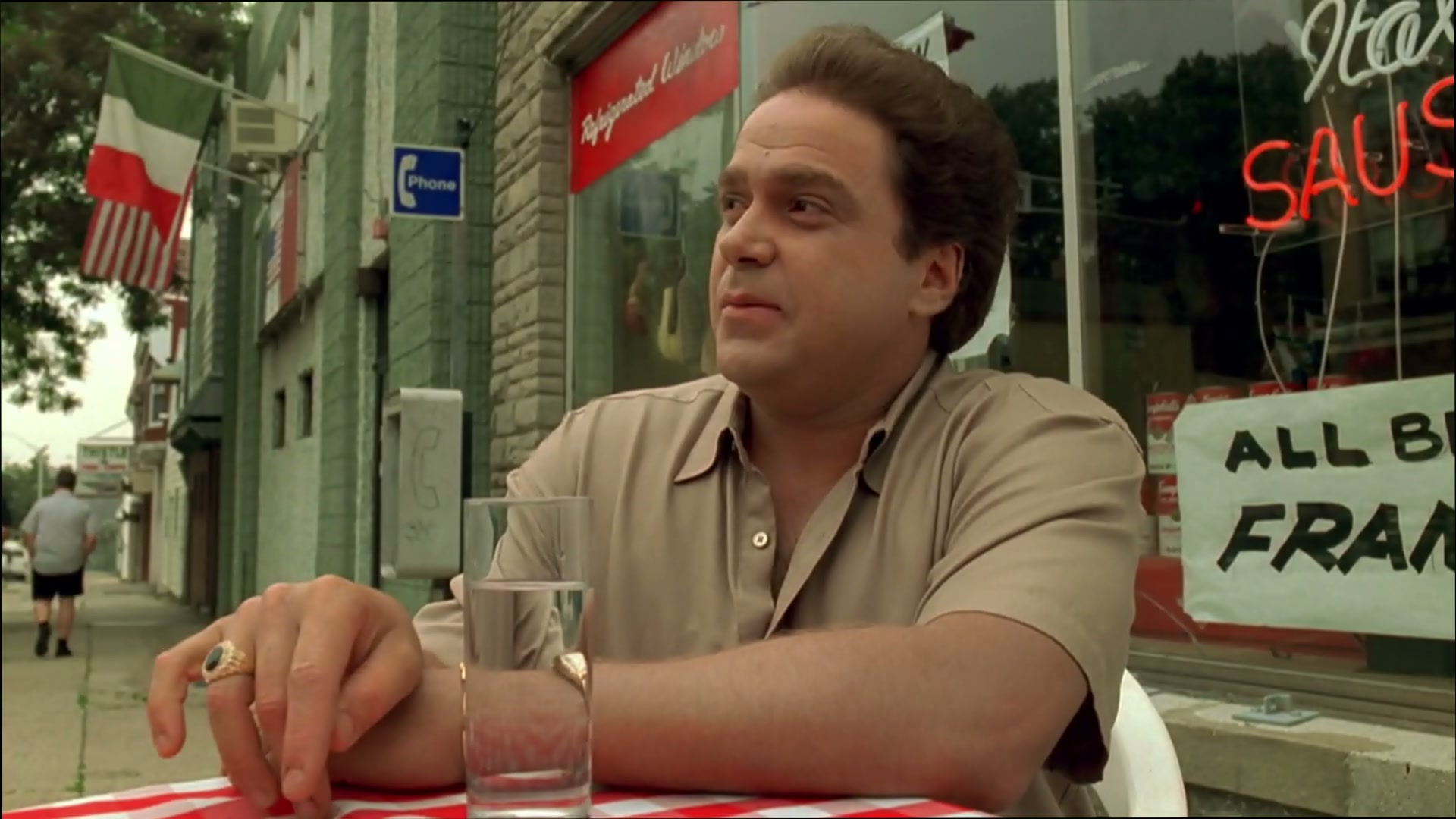
- Michael Rispoli as Giacomo "Jackie" Aprile Sr. in The Sopranos
- Born: November 27, 1960 (age 65)
- Occupation: Actor
- Years active: 1992–present
- Spouse: Madeline Rispoli

Michael Rispoli (born November 27, 1960) is an American character actor. He was a contender for the role of Tony Soprano in the HBO television series The Sopranos, but was ultimately cast as Jackie Aprile, a recurring character in the show's first season. Rispoli reunited with Sopranos co-star James Gandolfini in the 2009 thriller The Taking of Pelham 123. He was a series regular on the HBO series The Deuce.

== Early life and education ==
Rispoli, a second-generation Italian American, was raised in Tappan, New York, one of eight children, and attended Tappan Zee High School, where he played football. He majored in theater at State University of New York at Plattsburgh and graduated in 1982.

== Career ==
The feature film Union Square (co-written and directed by Sundance Film Festival Grand Jury Award winner Nancy Savoca) premiered in 2011 at the Toronto International Film Festival, Rispoli co-stars with Mira Sorvino, Patti LuPone, Tammy Blanchard, Mike Doyle and Daphne Rubin-Vega.

He also starred in the Pulitzer Prize-winning play Between Riverside and Crazy by Stephen Adly Guirgis.

== Filmography ==
=== Film ===
Year	Title	Role	Notes
1992	Night and the City	Trainer	
1993	Household Saints	Nicky Falconetti	
1994	Angie	Jerry	
1994	Above the Rim	Richard "Big Richie" Jones	
1995	Burnzy's Last Call	Officer Chris	
1995	While You Were Sleeping	Joe Jr.	
1995	To Die For	Ben DeLuca	
1996	The Juror	Joseph Boffano	
1996	Homeward Bound II: Lost in San Francisco	Jack	
1996	Feeling Minnesota	Manager of Motel	
1997	His & Hers	Nick	
1997	Volcano	"Gator" Harris	
1997	Cusp	Michael	Short
1998	Scar City	Sam Bandusky	
1998	Snake Eyes	Jimmy George (bookie)	
1998	Rounders	Grama	
1998	One Tough Cop	Lieutenant Denny Reagan	
1999	Summer of Sam	Joey T	
1999	The Third Miracle	John Leone	
2000	Two Family House	Buddy Visalo	
2000	It Had to Be You	Henry Taylor	
2000	Russo	Russo	
2002	Hacks	Al DeMarco	
2002	Death to Smoochy	"Spinner" Dunn	
2004	Mr. 3000	Boca	
2005	One Last Thing...	Babba	
2005	The Weather Man	Russ	
2006	Lonely Hearts	Coroner	
2006	Invincible	Max Cantrell	
2006	Club Soda	Jack	Short
2007	Black Irish	Joey	
2007	Made in Brooklyn	Dominick Sciacca	
2007	Stories USA	Jack	
2008	Yonkers Joe	Mickey	
2009	The Taking of Pelham 123	John Johnson	
2010	Kick-Ass	Big Joe	
2010	See You in September	Terrence	
2010	The Last Godfather	Tony V.	
2011	Union Square	Nick	
2011	The Rum Diary	Sala	
2011	The Reunion	Canton	
2013	Empire State	Tony	
2013	Pain & Gain	Frank Griga	
2013	Not for Human Consumption	Tony Trotta	
2014	Rob the Mob	Sal	
2014	Friends and Romans	Nick DeMaio	
2016	Exposed	Detective Dibronski	
2017	The Depths	Ray Ferguson	
2018	Honor Up	Victor	
2019	Framing John DeLorean	Jim Hoffman	Documentary
2019	Bottom of the 9th	Coach Hannis	
2020	Here After	Angelo	
2021	Cherry	Tommy	
2022	Allswell in New York	Ray	
2025	The Alto Knights	Albert Anastasia	
2025	Nonnas	Al	Completed

=== Television ===
Year	Title	Role	Notes
1995	Bless This House	Frank	Episode: "I Am Not My Sister's Keeper"
1995	The Great Defender	Lou Frischetti	Main cast
1996	My Guys	Sonny DeMarco	Main cast
1998	ER	Victor Nable	Episode: "A Hole in the Heart"
1998	Law & Order	Johnny DeMayo	Episode: "Faccia a Faccia"
1999	Touched by an Angel	Frankie	Episode: "Family Business"
1999	Ryan Caulfield: Year One	Officer Susser	Main cast
1999–2001	The Sopranos	Giacomo "Jackie" Aprile Sr.	Recurring cast: season 1, guest: season 3
1999–2002	Third Watch	Jerry Mankowicz	Recurring cast: seasons 1 & 3
2001	Big Apple	Swenson	Recurring cast
2002	Bram & Alice	Michael	Main cast
2003	Naked Hotel	Concierge	TV movie
2003	10-8: Officers on Duty	Angelo Amonte	Recurring cast
2005–06	Law & Order: Criminal Intent	Frank Adair	Episode: "My Good Name" & "On Fire"
2006	CSI: Crime Scene Investigation	Ike Mannleigh	Episode: "Loco Motives"
2007	The Black Donnellys	Al "Alo" Onatero	Recurring cast
2007	The Bronx Is Burning	Jimmy Breslin	Episode: "The Seven Commandments"
2008	The Oaks	Frank	Episode: "Pilot"
2008	Law & Order	Pete Haynes	Episode: "Challenged"
2010–11	Blue Bloods	Vitale/Jack Condo	Episode: "What You See" & "Critical Condition"
2012	Law & Order: Special Victims Unit	Henry Burzecki	Episode: "Street Revenge"
2012	Common Law	Kevin Boyd	Episode: "Role Play"
2012	The Manzanis	Nick	TV movie
2012–13	Magic City	Belvin "Bel" Jaffe	Recurring cast
2013	Over/Under	Franco Puzzo	TV movie
2013	Person of Interest	Darien Makris	Episode: "All In"
2014	Those Who Kill	Detective Don Wilkie	Recurring cast
2014	The Good Wife	Stu Harper	Episode: "Sticky Content"
2015	The Man in the High Castle	Don Warren	Episode: "The New World"
2016	Madoff	Frank DiPascali	Main cast
2016	Feed the Beast	Detective Guy Giordano	Recurring cast
2017	Chicago Justice	John Beckett	Episode: "Dead Meat"
2017	American Dad!	Townie (voice)	Episode: "Camp Campawanda"
2017–19	The Deuce	Rudy Pipilo	Main cast
2018	Elementary	Sean O'Grady	Episode: "Through the Fog"
2019–23	Billions	Richie Sansome	Recurring cast: seasons 4 & 7
2020	FBI: Most Wanted	Ray Higgins	Episode: "Ironbound"
2020	Dirty John	Betty's father	Recurring cast: season 2
2021	Chicago P.D.	Officer Dave Wheelan	Episode: "Protect and Serve"
2021	Godfather of Harlem	Joseph Magliocco	Episode: "The Geechee"
2022	The Offer	Tommy Lucchese	Recurring cast
2022–23	Power Book III: Raising Kanan	Sal Boselli	Recurring cast: seasons 2–3
2026	The Westies	Vinnie Zaccaro	Episode: "The Troubles"
