= John Billingsley =

American actor (born 1960)

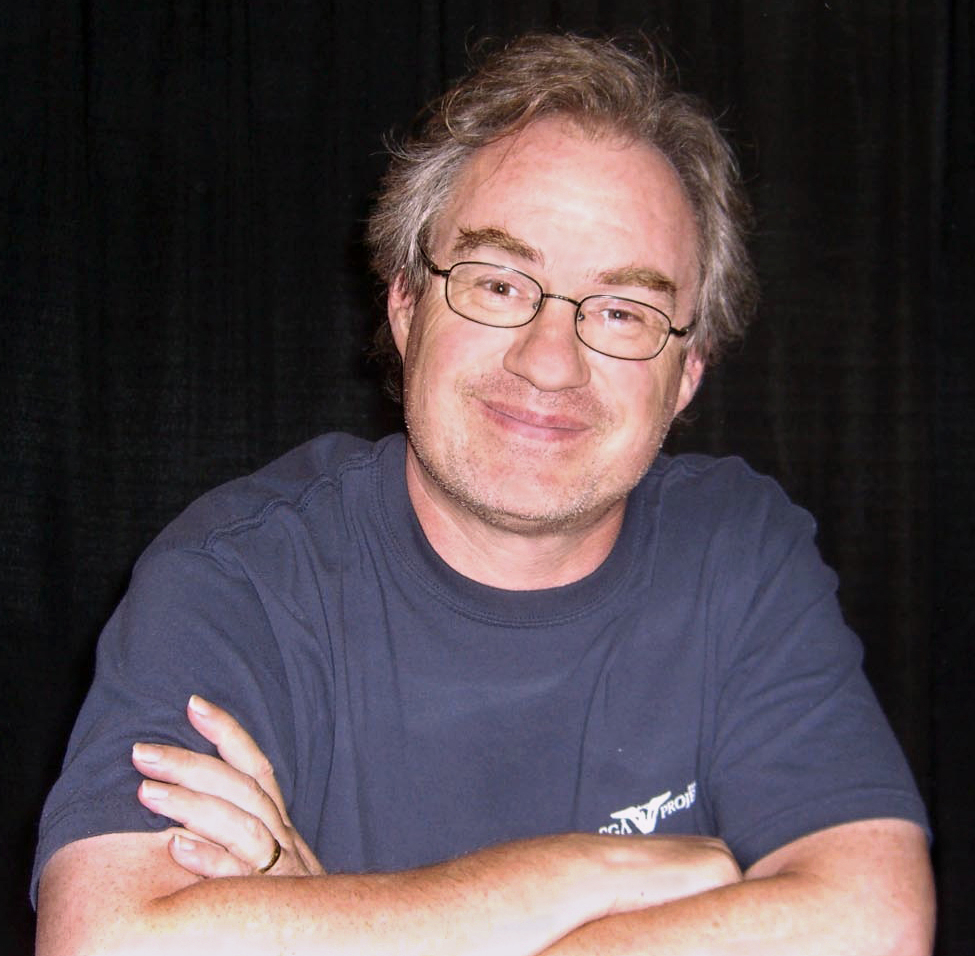
- Billingsley at the 2009 Big Apple Convention
- Born: May 20, 1960 (age 66); Media, Pennsylvania, U.S.
- Education: Bennington College
- Occupation: Actor
- Years active: 1991–present
- Spouse: Bonita Friedericy

John Billingsley (/ˈbɪlɪŋɡzli/, born May 20, 1960) is an American actor best known for his role as Doctor Phlox on the television series Star Trek: Enterprise.

== Early life and education ==
Billingsley was born in Media, Pennsylvania, and subsequently lived in Huntsville, Alabama, and Slidell, Louisiana, before his family settled in Weston, Connecticut.

He graduated from Bennington College in 1982.

== Career ==
=== Early work ===
Billingsley's second on-screen role was in 1991 as a difficult customer making a return in a customer service training video produced by Nintendo of America. He made an appearance in "It Happened in Juneau", a third-season episode of the TV comedy-drama Northern Exposure, playing a patient treated by Marilyn.

Billingsley subsequently appeared in The X-Files episode "Three of a Kind", as a friend of the Lone Gunmen who turns out to be a government spy. He played Bill Gates in a sketch on Seattle comedy show Almost Live!. One of Billingsley's earliest film roles was in the 2001 made-for-television historical drama Just Ask My Children, in which he played corrupt lawyer Andrew Gines.

=== 2000s ===
Billingsley played Dr. John Fallow in a West Wing episode that featured the Gall–Peters projection map (season 2, episode 16). He was cast as Professor Miles Ballard in the short-lived television series The Others; then as the Denobulan Doctor Phlox in the fifth live-action Star Trek series, Star Trek: Enterprise, which ran for four seasons. He also played himself in an episode of Roswell that used the Enterprise set. He also starred in the independent film Breathing Hard (2000) in the same year. In 2002, he was a guest star in an episode of Stargate SG-1, playing a scientist who is also a Trekkie, "worshipping at the altar of Roddenberry". He played a supporting role in the 2003 thriller Out of Time as medical examiner and best friend to the chief of police, played by Denzel Washington.

Billingsley is well known to fans of the series Cold Case for his guest appearance in the show's second season, playing serial killer George Marks, the only killer on the show to get away with murder. He reprised the role in the season finale, in which Marks was killed. He also appeared as a blunt-force victim in the first season of Six Feet Under, in the episode "The New Person".

Billingsley appeared in the first season of the series Prison Break as the mysterious Terrence Steadman, brother of the Vice President, whose death is faked to frame Lincoln Burrows for murder. Soon after, he was cast as a regular on the series The Nine. This left him unable to continue his role as Steadman, and he was replaced in the role by Jeff Perry. In 2005, he played the voice of Trask in Ultimate Spider-Man. In November 2006, Billingsley portrayed William Bradford on two episodes of the podcast The Radio Adventures of Dr. Floyd. In May 2007 he appeared on NCIS as a blind photographer in the episode, "In The Dark". He appeared in the seventh season of 24 as a recurring character. On October 8, 2007, he also made a guest appearance on Journeyman as Alan Platt. Billingsley played Prof. Harry, a biologist, in the 2007 independent science fiction film The Man from Earth, as well as the 2017 sequel The Man from Earth: Holocene. He also made a guest appearance in an October 2007 episode of CSI: Crime Scene Investigation, and in 2006 on the spinoff series CSI: NY.

Billingsley appeared as Jacob Nolston in "Crash Into Me", a two-part, fourth-season episode of the TV drama Grey's Anatomy.

Billingsley and his wife have also appeared as themselves on the HGTV series My House Is Worth What?, in which a real estate expert toured their home and provided commentary for viewers before providing an appraisal.

In 2008, Billingsley had a supporting role in several episodes of the HBO series True Blood as coroner Mike Spencer. In May of that year, he guest starred as John Harris, the father of the Kiss-Me-Not Killer, in "Never Tell", an episode of Women's Murder Club.

He appeared in the disaster film 2012, which was released on November 13, 2009, as Professor Frederic West, an American scientist. He subsequently appeared on the ABC series Scrubs in December 2009.

=== 2010s ===
In August 2010, Billingsley guest starred in an episode of the TNT series Leverage as Coswell, the head of security at the Boston Museum of Art and Antiquities. In November that year he guest starred as amateur psychic Ellis Mars in "Red Moon", an episode of The Mentalist.

In February 2011 Billingsley played Gidger in the Richard Greenberg's play The Violet Hour in Los Angeles. In August 2011, Billingsley starred in an episode of the USA Network drama Suits as the company accountant who is being released for never finishing university.

In October 2012 Billingsley starred in the film Trade of Innocents alongside Dermot Mulroney and Mira Sorvino.

On February 12, 2013, a web comedy video was released on Yahoo! Screen under the title "Forwarders" that featured Billingsley as an Dr. Alan Cooper, a psychologist and expert on compulsive e-mail forwarding. That same year he completed filming of the independent film Red Line.

On January 7, 2014, CBS television premiered the science fiction drama Intelligence, on which Billingsley played Dr. Shenandoah Cassidy, the inventor of an implantable microchip that acts as an interface between a human mind and electronic devices.

In November 2014, Billingsley guest-starred in the CBS crime drama series, Hawaii Five-0, playing lawyer Eugene Goodman in the Season 5 episode, "Ka Hana Malu".

In May 2015, Billingsley appeared in the second season of the AMC period drama, Turn: Washington's Spies, playing Samuel Townsend, father of American Revolutionary spy, Robert Townsend. He later returned to the role for the third season.

In July 2017, he appeared as Doctor Ben in the Showtime revival of Twin Peaks.

=== 2020s ===
Billingsley voiced as Martin / "Clyde" in the 2020 science fiction horror podcast The Left Right Game.

In 2024, Billingsley played Joseph Holt in the Apple TV+ historical drama miniseries Manhunt.

== Personal life ==
Billingsley is married to fellow actress Bonita Friedericy. She first became interested in him after seeing him perform in a stage production of Great Expectations. Friedericy appeared with Billingsley in "Regeneration", a 2003 episode of Star Trek: Enterprise in which she played Rooney. The couple has subsequently appeared in other productions together.

== Filmography ==
=== Film ===
Key
†	Denotes films that have not yet been released

Year	Title	Role	Notes
1989	Shredder Orpheus	Linus	
2001	Crocodile Dundee in Los Angeles	Barry	
2001	Just Ask My Children	Andrew Gines	
2001	The Glass House	Driving Instructor	
2002	High Crimes	Lie Detector Coach	
2003	Out of Time	Chae	
2004	A Cinderella Story	Mr. Rothman	
2005	The 12 Dogs of Christmas	Dogcatcher Doyle	
2006	Room 6	Harrison McKendrick	
2007	The Man from Earth	Harry	
2008	The Last Word	Brady	
2008	The Least of These	Father Alfred McKavee	
2009	2012	Professor Frederick West	
2011	Losing Control	Professor Straub	
2011	Sironia	Doug	
2012	Trade of Innocents	Malcolm Eddery	
2013	Red Line	Sam	
2016	Madtown	Lloyd Zane Miller	
2017	The Man from Earth: Holocene	Harry	
2022	Emily the Criminal	Office manager	
2023	The Shift	Russo	
2025	Anaconda	Jerry	

=== Television ===
Key
†	Denotes television productions that have not yet been released

Year	Title	Role	Notes
1992	Northern Exposure	Patient	Episode: "It Happened in Juneau"
1996	Almost Live!	Bill Gates	1 episode
1997	NYPD Blue	Glenn Farley	Episode: "It Takes a Village"
1998	The Practice	Revenue Officer Robert Schmitt	Episode: "The Trial"
1999	The X-Files	Timothy "Timmy the Geek" Landau	Episode: "Three of a Kind"
2000	G vs E	Bill Kaplan	Episode: "Cougar Pines"
2000	Gilmore Girls	Mr. Remmy	Episode: "The Lorelais' First Day At Chilton"
2000	The Others	Professor Miles Ballard	Main cast
2000	Touched by an Angel	Peter Garfield	Episode: "Reasonable Doubt"
2001	The West Wing	Dr. John Fallow	Episode: "Somebody's Going to Emergency, Somebody's Going to Jail"
2001	Roswell	Himself	Episode: "Secrets and Lies"
2001–2005	Star Trek: Enterprise	Dr. Phlox	Main cast
2002	NYPD Blue	Ryan Lipe	2 episodes
2002	Stargate SG-1	Dr. Simon Coombs	Episode: "The Other Guys"
2003	Angel	Dr. Evan Royce	Episode: "Unleashed"
2004	Duck Dodgers	Dr. Psy-Q Hi	2 episodes (voice role)
2004–2005	Cold Case	George Marks	2 episodes
2006	Prison Break	Terrence Steadman	3 episodes
2006	CSI: NY	Cecil Arthur	Episode: "Risk"
2006	The Closer	Tom Newman	Episode: "Aftertaste"
2006–2007; 2009	The Nine	Egan Foote	Main cast
2006	Dead and Deader	Langdon	TV movie
2007	NCIS	Jackson Scott	Episode: "In the Dark"
2007	Ghost Whisperer	Mike	Episode: “Children of Ghosts”
2007	Journeyman	Alan Pratt	Episode: “Game Three”
2007	Grey's Anatomy	Jacob Nolston	2 episodes
2007	CSI: Crime Scene Investigation	Paul Cydon	Episode: "The Case of the Cross-Dressing Carp"
2008–2012	True Blood	Coroner Mike Spencer	Recurring role (seasons 1–2, 5), guest episode (season 3)
2008	Eli Stone	Daniel Foote	Episode: "Waiting for That Day"
2008	Without a Trace	Harry	Episode: "Rewind"
2008	Fear Itself	Phil	Episode: "Community"
2009	Criminal Minds	Hugh Rollins	Episode: "A Shade of Gray"
2009	24	Michael Latham	3 episodes
2010	Leverage	Head of Security	Episode: "The Rashomon Job"
2010	The Mentalist	Ellis Mars	Episode: "Red Moon"
2011–2014	Suits	Stan Jacobson	2 episodes
2012	Scooby-Doo! Mystery Incorporated	Dr. Henklefust	Episode: "The Night the Clown Cried II: Tears of Doom!" (voice role)
2013	Southland	uncredited	Episode: "Under the Big Top"
2013	Nikita	Heidecker	Episode: "Brave New World"
2014	Bones	Dr. Edward Harkness	Episode: "The Corpse at the Convention"
2014	Intelligence	Dr. Shenendoah Cassidy	Main cast
2014	Hawaii Five-0	Eugene Goodman	1 episode
2014	NCIS: Los Angeles	Doug Ouellet	Episode: “Black Budget”
2015–2016	Turn: Washington's Spies	Samuel Townsend	Recurring role (seasons 2–3)
2016–2017	Stitchers	Mitchell Blair	Recurring role (seasons 2–3)
2017	Code Black	Mr. Hazelton	Episode: "Vertigo"
2017	Man Seeking Woman	Watson	Episode: "Bagel"
2017	Twin Peaks	Dr. Ben	Episode: "Part 10"
2017	Lucifer	Alvin	Episode: "Off the Record"
2018	The 5th Quarter	Martin Fuller	Episode: "A Lift of Their Own"
2018	This Is Us	Bill Weston	Episode "Katie Girls"
2018	The Conners	Mr. Swindell	Episode: "There Won't Be Blood"
2019	The Orville	Cambis Borrin	Episode: "Home"
2019	The Rookie	Kevin Scott	Episode: "Heartbreak"
2019	The Resident	Dr. Stewart	Episode: "If Not Now, When?"
2019	Unbelievable	Judge Brent Gordon	Episode: "Episode 8"
2019	Shameless	Dr. Drew	Episode: "Which America?"
2020	All Rise	Dr. Timothy Gipson	Episode: "What the Constitution Greens to Me"
2020	Homecoming	Buddy	Episode: "People"
2020	Next	Richard Weiss	Episode: "FILE #1"
2021	Station 19	Lloyd	Episode: "Here It Comes Again"
2022	Pam & Tommy	Bruce Hendricks	Episode: "Pamela in Wonderland"
2022	NCIS: Hawaiʻi	Professor Staggs	Episode: "Prisoners' Dilemma"
2023	The Good Doctor	Kurt	Episode: "A Beautiful Day"
2024	Manhunt	Joseph Holt	Episode: "The Final Act"
2024	Grotesquerie	Dr. Lehman	2 episodes
2024	Matlock	Robert Walton	Episode: "The Rabbit and the Hawk"
2024	Based on a True Story	Wendy Jenkins's boss	Episode: "Y'all Ready for This?"
TBA	The Murder of JonBenét Ramsey †	Bill McReynolds	Recurring role, post-production

=== Video games ===
Year	Title	Role	Notes
2005	Ultimate Spider-Man	Bolivar Trask	
2006	Superman Returns	Metallo, additional voices	
