= Waterlily Jaguar =

2018 film by Melora Walters

- Film poster
- Directed by: Melora Walters
- Written by: Melora Walters
- Produced by: Jonathan Piumelli; Mark Sayre; Troy Daniel Smith; Melora Walters
- Starring: James LeGros; Mira Sorvino; Stacey Oristano; Dominic Monaghan; Christopher Backus; Steven Swadling
- Cinematography: Patrick Meade Jones
- Edited by: Dale Fabrigar
- Music by: Matt Dahan
- Production companies: Lexicon Entertainment; Room in the Sky Films
- Release date: September 22, 2018
- Country: United States
- Language: English

Waterlily Jaguar is a 2018 drama film written and directed by Melora Walters. The film stars James LeGros, Mira Sorvino, Stacey Oristano, Dominic Monaghan, Christopher Backus and Steven Swadling. The film centers on Bob (LeGros), a famous novelist known for his "airport novels" seeking to pen a more serious book, only to find himself tumbling down a spiral of obsession that may leave his most important relationships in shambles, including his marriage.

== Cast ==
- James LeGros as Bob
- Mira Sorvino as Helen, his wife
- Stacey Oristano as Wilhelmina, his assistant
- Dominic Monaghan as Bill, his agent
- Christopher Backus as Jackson
- Steven Swadling as Peter
- Lili Mirojnick as Scarlet

== Production ==
Filming started in Los Angeles in January 2017 and lasted several weeks.
