= Doubting Thomas (2018 film) =

- Directed by: Will McFadden
- Written by: Will McFadden; Joseph Campbell
- Produced by: Casey Morris; Laura Jane Salvato; Mark Sayre
- Starring: Will McFadden; Sarah Butler; Jamie Hector; Robert Belushi; Zach Cregger; James Morrison; Melora Walters
- Cinematography: Phil Parmet
- Edited by: Anthony O'Brien; Mark Sayre
- Music by: David Majzlin
- Production company: Long Way Home
- Distributed by: Gravitas Ventures
- Release dates: 12 June 2018 (Dances With Films Festival); 11 October 2019 (limited)
- Running time: 79 minutes
- Country: United States
- Language: English

Doubting Thomas is a 2018 American drama film directed by Will McFadden, starring McFadden, Sarah Butler, Jamie Hector, Robert Belushi, Zach Cregger, James Morrison and Melora Walters.

== Plot ==
A Black baby is born to a white couple. The insensitive comments and a busybody co-worker add to the progression of stress on the couple. The swirl of perceptions about race raises suspicions, threatens relationships, and also extracts a secret.

== Cast ==
- Will McFadden as Tom
- Sarah Butler as Jen
- Jamie Hector as Ron
- Robert Belushi as Alex
- Zach Cregger as Graham
- James Morrison as Bill
- Melora Walters as Kate
- Kendall Chappell as Megan
- Shaun O'Hagan as Mike Wilford
- Hustle as Daryl
- Byron Wallace as Byron
- Myke Wright as Walt
- Phil Parmet as Albright
- Alicia Blasingame as Kendall
- Chuma Gault as Officer Henderson
- Cosmo Jordan as baby

== Release ==
The film was released on 11 October 2019.

== Reception ==
John Defore of The Hollywood Reporter wrote that while the script is "uneven", the film is "open-ended enough to acknowledge that the remedies for unacknowledged prejudice are neither easy nor clearly identified."

Bobby LePire of Film Threat gave the film a score of 10/10 and wrote that the "acting is stellar, the writing is honest, and what it says about race, perception, and your true self is sincere."

Carlos Aguilar of the Los Angeles Times called the film a "mostly hackneyed lesson on racial biases desperately stumbling to appear provocative."
