= Crime Story (2021 film) =

- Film poster
- Directed by: Adam Lipsius
- Written by: Adam Lipsius
- Produced by: Tara Ansley; Alex Mace; Kris Wynne
- Starring: Richard Dreyfuss; Mira Sorvino
- Distributed by: Saban Films; Paramount Home Entertainment
- Release date: August 13, 2021
- Running time: 98 minutes
- Country: United States
- Language: English

Crime Story (formerly titled The Last Job and Reckoning) is a 2021 American crime drama thriller film written and directed by Adam Lipsius and starring Richard Dreyfuss and Mira Sorvino. It was released on August 13, 2021 to negative reviews from critics.

== Synopsis ==
A former mob boss Ben Myers (Richard Dreyfuss) embarks on a deadly rampage of revenge after he becomes the target of a home robbery. The perpetrators think they have got all the footage from the home cameras but Myers has one hidden which captures the whole robbery. Myers then tracks the perps down with the help of some of the contacts he has left. However, when his family gets caught in the crossfire, he must finally face the consequences of his dark past.

== Cast ==
- Richard Dreyfuss as Ben Myers
- Mira Sorvino as Nick Wallace
- Pruitt Taylor Vince as Tommy
- D. W. Moffett as Congressman Billings
- Cress Williams as Jimmy
- Alejandra Rivera Flaviá as Celina
- Aiden Malik as Yonatan
- Joanna Walchuk as Sherry
- Megan McFarland as Nun
- Andrea Frankle as Mrs. Billings

== Production ==
Development for Crime Story began sometime before 2018. Filming began in February 2019 in Savannah, Georgia.

== Release ==
The film was released in theaters and on demand and digital platforms on August 13, 2021.

== Reception ==
On review aggregator website Rotten Tomatoes, the film holds an approval rating of 20% based on 15 reviews, with an average rating of 4.1/10.

Dennis Harvey, writing for Variety, described the film as an "inept muddle", and stated that it "has the feel of an enterprise whose script wasn’t quite ready for “action!”: Half the dialogue sounds haplessly improvised, with sporadic voiceover narration coming off as an equally forlorn attempt to belatedly cohere a half-baked whole." Jeffrey M. Anderson of Common Sense Media gave the film a score of 2 out of 5 stars, writing: "Despite teaming up two Oscar-winning actors, Adam Lipsius' generically titled crime drama is an overwrought, often-confusing assembly of twitchy camerawork and a relentless score."
