= A Mother's Rage =

2013 television film

- Genre: Drama, mystery, thriller
- Story by: Shane Mathers
- Directed by: Oren Kaplan
- Starring: Lori Loughlin; Kristen Dalton; Shaun Sipos; Ted McGinley
- Theme music composer: Sean Murray

Production
- Producer: Frederick Cipoletti
- Cinematography: Jeff Dolen
- Editor: Nic Hill
- Running time: 85 min

Original release
- Release: April 6, 2013

A Mother's Rage (also entitled Road Trip) is a 2013 television film directed by Oren Kaplan and starring Lori Loughlin, Kristen Dalton and Ted McGinley. The story starts with Rebecca Mayer and her daughter Conner, who is about to start her first day in college, being chased by a carjacker on the road. After they call the police, Emily Tobin, a local officer, begins to investigate the case.

== Cast ==
- Lori Loughlin as Rebecca Mayer
- Kristen Dalton as Emily Tobin
- Jordan Hinson as Conner Mayer
- Alix Elizabeth Gitter as Molly Tobin
- Shaun Sipos as Calvin
- Christopher Backus as Kelly
- Ted McGinley as Stan
