= Just Ask My Children =

2001 historical drama made-for-TV film

- advertising poster
- Genre: Drama
- Written by: Deborah Serra
- Directed by: Arvin Brown
- Starring: Virginia Madsen; Jeffrey Nordling; John Billingsley; Graham Beckel; Deirdre O'Connell
- Music by: Patrick Williams
- Country of origin: United States
- Original language: English

Production
- Executive producers: Laurette Hayden; Greg Klein
- Production location: United States
- Cinematography: Lowell Peterson
- Editor: Scott Vickrey
- Running time: 1 hour, 31 minutes
- Production company: Brayton-Carlucci Productions

Original release
- Network: LMN
- Release: September 10, 2001

Just Ask My Children is a 2001 historical drama made-for-television film, recounting the true story of the Kern County child abuse cases from the perspectives of various members of the Kniffen Family.

== Plot ==
In 1982, parents Brenda Kniffen (Virginia Madsen) and her husband Scott Kniffen (Jeffrey Nordling) are arrested due to false accusations of satanic ritual abuse, child molestation and other acts of illegal activity. Two years later, following a systematic trial, they are found guilty and both sentenced to 240 years in prison without parole. Brenda and Scott have two young boys, Brandon and Brian Kniffen, who are played by various actors as they age from little boys to grown adult men in the foster care system.

Denver Dunn (Graham Beckel), a private detective, is hired soon afterwards to have the Kniffen parents exonerated.

Ms. Landry (Deirdre O'Connell), who worked as a guard in the prison, would show disgust towards Brenda at first, but as time passed, she would start to have doubts about Brenda's guilt as American society began to be more critical of 1980's "Satanic Panic" type cases.

It would be revealed that Scott and Brenda were wrongfully accused from the false accusations made 14 years earlier. In 1996, after serving the first 12 years in prison, Scott and Brenda were released and exonerated. Having missed their children, and missed seeing them grow up within those 12 years, the family's reunion is bittersweet.
What was also shown in the film was corruption from within the legal system, noting that the Kniffen boys were coached by social workers and prosecutor Andrew Gines (John Billingsley) to claim that the abuse had occurred.

== Cast ==
- Virginia Madsen as Brenda Kniffen
- Jeffrey Nordling as Scott Kniffen
- Graham Beckel as Denver Dunn
- Deirdre O'Connell as Ms. Landry
- John Billingsley as Andrew Gines
- Robert Joy as Sam Bennis
- Barbara Tarbuck as Marilyn Kniffen
- Maree Cheatham as Corene Oliver
- Ryan Wilson as Brian Kniffen (age 6)
- Cody Dorkin as Brandon Wilson (age 9)
- Scott Bailey as Brandon Kniffen (age 15–21)
- Gregory Smith as Brian Kniffen (age 16–18)

== Reception ==
The film was called "one of the most powerful stories of injustice you will ever see" on The Movie Scene. It airs sporadically on the Lifetime Movie Network. Due to its television release date coinciding the following day with the 9/11 Attacks, the film received little attention until its DVD release in 2002, after which it was nominated for The American Society of Cinematographers Award for Outstanding Achievement in Cinematography in Movies of the Week/Mini-Series/Pilot (Basic or Pay).
