= Indiscretion (2016 film) =

- Film poster
- Written by: John Stewart Muller; Laura Boersma
- Directed by: John Stewart Muller
- Starring: Mira Sorvino; Cary Elwes; Christopher Backus; Katherine McNamara; Melora Walters; LisaGay Hamilton
- Music by: Toby Chu
- Country of origin: United States
- Original language: English

Production
- Producers: John Stewart Muller, p.g.a. Laura Boersma, p.g.a. Thomas Beach; Gabriel Lang; Timothy Rhys
- Cinematography: Frederick W. Schroeder
- Editor: Sam Restivo
- Running time: 99 minutes
- Production company: Granfalloon Productions

Original release
- Network: Lifetime
- Release: July 23, 2016

Indiscretion is a 2016 American psychological thriller film written and directed by John Stewart Muller and starring Mira Sorvino, Cary Elwes, Christopher Backus, and Katherine McNamara. It was co-written and produced by Laura Boersma, Muller's partner at Santa Monica-based Granfalloon Productions. Its world broadcast premiere was July 23, 2016 on Lifetime.

== Plot ==
Mira Sorvino stars as a politician's wife whose weekend fling with a tortured young artist leads to a dangerous obsession.

== Cast ==
- Mira Sorvino as Dr. Veronica 'Ronnie' Simon
- Cary Elwes as Jake Simon
- Christopher Backus as Victor Bernard
- Katherine McNamara as Lizzy Simon
- Melora Walters as Dr. Harper
- LisaGay Hamilton as Karen Wyatt
- Shane Callahan as Neil
- Buck Taylor as Abe
- Marco St. John as Governor Wallace
- Jason Bayle as Marcus
- Liliana Tandon as Rebecca
- Brittany Clark as Ellie
- Lara Grice as Cathy
- Colby Arps as Josh
- Chris J. Floyd as Pete
- Xandra Clark as Riley Evans

== Production ==
The film was shot in and around New Orleans.
