= Friends and Romans =

2014 American comedy film

- Directed by: Christopher Kublan
- Written by: Gregg Greenberg; Christopher Kublan; Michael Rispoli
- Produced by: Michael Mailer
- Starring: Michael Rispoli; Annabella Sciorra
- Cinematography: Austin F. Schmidt
- Music by: Aaron Mirman
- Release date: October 17, 2014 (Woodstock Film Festival)
- Language: English

Friends and Romans is a 2014 American independent comedy film written and directed by Christopher Kublan and starring Michael Rispoli, Annabella Sciorra, Paul Ben-Victor and Tony Sirico. It was awarded Best Narrative Feature and Best Cinematography at the 2014 Boston International Film Festival and Favorite Narrative Feature at the Napa Valley Film Festival.

== Plot ==
Nick DeMaio, who has had small acting roles over the years, seeks to be more than just the Italian mob stereotype. When he is not successful getting an appropriate role from productions by others, he rents a Staten Island theater and puts together his own production of Julius Caesar, with the help of other actors he knows. What he doesn't know is that the theater owner, who auditions for and gets the role of Brutus, is the reclusive mobster the FBI has been investigating. Meanwhile, Nick's daughter Gina wants the lead role in Guys and Dolls at her school, but she gets it only because the drama teacher believes her father is a real mobster.

== Cast ==
- Michael Rispoli as Nick DeMaio
- Annabella Sciorra as Angela DeMaio
- Paul Ben-Victor as Dennis Socio
- Katie Stevens as Gina DeMaio
- Charlie Semine as Paulie / Goldberg
- Anthony DeSando as Joey 'Bananas' Bongano
- Tony Sirico as Bobby Musso
- Tony Darrow as Frankie Fusso
- Patrick Kerr as Mr. Rothman
- Christopher Kublan as Joey Two Chins
- Joseph D'Onofrio as Big Vinnie
- Louis Vanaria as Tony Passioni
- Stephen Mailer as Principal Patten
- John Buffalo Mailer as Schultz
- Jane Wells as Radio Newscaster
- Salena Qureshi as Linda
