= WiseGirls =

- UK DVD cover
- Directed by: David Anspaugh
- Written by: John Meadows
- Produced by: Jack Sojka; Anthony Esposito; Billy Blake; Richard Brams
- Starring: Mira Sorvino; Mariah Carey; Melora Walters
- Cinematography: Johnny E. Jensen
- Edited by: Christopher Cibelli
- Music by: Keith Forsey
- Production companies: Lions Gate Entertainment; Leading Pictures; Intermedia Films
- Distributed by: Lions Gate Entertainment; Intermedia Films; Cinemax
- Release date: January 13, 2002 (Sundance Film Festival)
- Running time: 93 minutes
- Language: English
- Budget: $11 million

WiseGirls is a 2002 crime drama film directed by David Anspaugh and starring Mira Sorvino, Mariah Carey and Melora Walters. The film was produced by Lions Gate Films, Leading Pictures and Intermedia Films. The story centers around Meg Kennedy (Sorvino), a medical school dropout who gets a part-time job as a waitress working at an Italian restaurant in New York City. Befriending other waitresses, Kate (Walters) and Raychel (Carey), Meg slowly learns that the restaurant is run by mobsters as she delves deeper into their dangerous world.

The film premiered at the 2002 Sundance Film Festival and was released later that year on Cinemax with international distribution managed by Intermedia Films. Upon release, the film received generally mixed reviews from critics, with praise for the plot twists, themes and the performances of the cast, particularly Carey, but criticism for its directing, tone and overuse of mafia stereotypes.

== Plot ==
Returning from Missouri as a medical school dropout, Meg Kennedy moves to Staten Island, New York City, staying with her grandmother due to not having found a place for herself. With the recommendation of Mrs. Saladino, a woman who looks after Meg's grandmother, Meg takes work at an Italian restaurant, run by Gio Esposito. At first, Meg makes mistakes and fails to live up to Esposito's expectations. However, she soon proves her worth by saving the life of a restaurant patron from a gunshot wound. Meg becomes a well known waitress by the restaurant's customers and saves enough money from her tips to buy her own apartment.

Meg befriends two other waitresses: Kate, who aspires to be a Broadway star, and Raychel, an outspoken, brassy woman. The three become close friends and make a pact to meet once a year at a particular bar. Meg also opens up to them about recent loss of her fiancé. Despite this, Meg becomes aware that the restaurant is not only mob-owned, but also a front for drug-dealing operations of which Raychel and possibly Kate appear to be aware. Struggling to pull her life together, Meg finds it harder to accept monetary tokens from restaurant owner Mr. Santalino, while also fending off the romantic advances of his son, Frankie.

Things come to a breaking point when Esposito drunkenly assaults Meg in the face. Frankie and Mr. Santalino kill him while Meg watches in horror. Frankie forces Meg at gunpoint to cut Esposito's body up into little pieces so they can dispose of his body in a meat grinder. Later as distraught Meg tells Kate everything and lets her know that she plans on leaving town. Kate reveals that she is an undercover police officer and that she had recorded everything Meg said. The police then tap Meg's necklace and put her back undercover at the restaurant, hoping that Mr. Santalino or Frankie will confess to the murder of Esposito.

During her shift later that night, Meg pretends to have a headache and goes to get an aspirin from Frankie but fails to get a confession from him. Meg tries to warn Raychel, who was promoted to manager, to get out of the restaurant before the police come but is interrupted by Frankie and his group. Meg later sees Mr. Santalino, and gets a confession out of him. Meg thanks him for his heroics and he subsequently promises to do what he did to Esposito to any other man who hurts her. In the process, Mr. Santalino notices Kate watching and he rips Meg's necklace off, horrified at her betrayal. In a gun fight, Kate shoots Frankie dead while she is also shot. Meg attempts to save Kate's life but Mr. Santalino attempts to shoot her. Before he can do so, Raychel shoots him dead and she is arrested. Meg tries to use a knife to save Kate's lungs from filling up with blood, but is ultimately shot by Kate's partner, Garcia, who consequently realises that Meg was saving her.

A year later, Raychel lays flowers at Meg's gravestone. Kate, who survived thanks to Meg, visits Raychel at the bar they made a pact to meet every year. Kate lets Raychel know that she was the reason she got off on probation. She then reveals Meg, who survived and jokes that she'd have to kill Raychel if she told her how she survived. The trio share a drink together and express their adoration for each other.

== Cast ==
- Mira Sorvino as Meg Kennedy
- Mariah Carey as Raychel
- Melora Walters as Kate
- Arthur J. Nascarella as Mr. Santalino
- Joseph Siravo as Gio Esposito
- Christian Maelen as Frankie Santalino
- Saul Stein as Umberto
- Anthony Alessandro as Lorenzo
- Noam Jenkins as Garcia
- Louis Di Bianco as Deluca
- Dax Ravina as Tony
- Karen Giordano as Angela Fontaine
- Michael Egan as Joey Jr.
- Tina Bruno as Mrs. Saladino
- Isa Thomas as Grandmother Nell

== Production ==
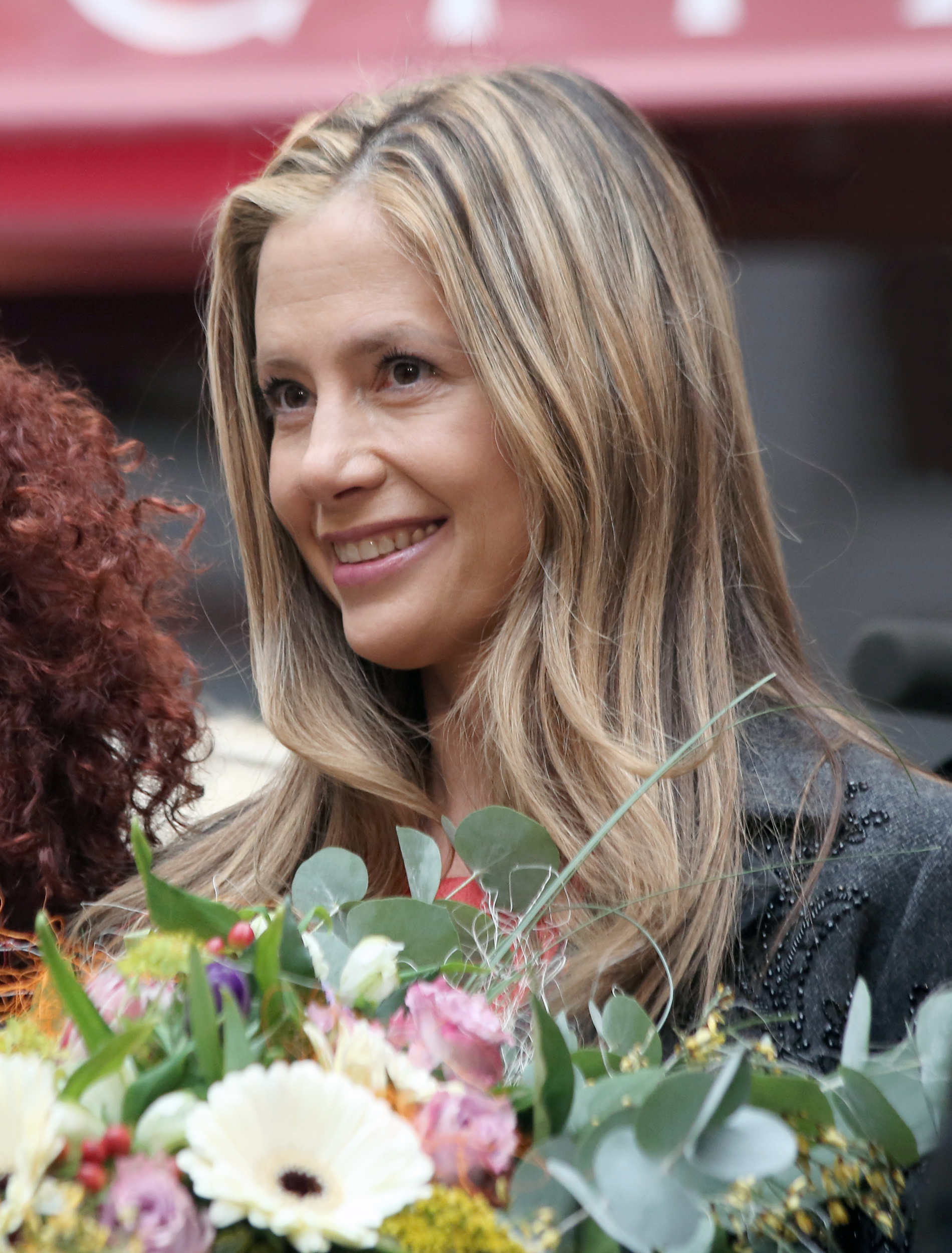
Mira Sorvino (pictured) received mixed reviews as Meg with comparisons made to her Academy Award winning performance in Mighty Aphrodite

In 1999, American singer Mariah Carey began working on a film and soundtrack project titled All That Glitters and signed a $100 million deal with Virgin Records. The film was retitled to Glitter and production began in 2000. During this time, Carey also began working on another film entitled WiseGirls. This film was produced by Lions Gate Films, Leading Pictures and Intermedia Films. Following commencement for Glitter and the release of the soundtrack's lead single "Loverboy", Carey embarked on a short promotional campaign for the song but was stopped short due to Carey being hospitalized, citing "extreme exhaustion" and a "physical and emotional breakdown". Promotion and production for Glitter and WiseGirls respectively came to a halt causing both films to receive a "publicity boost" in the media. Virgin Records commented on Carey's hospitalisation stating that,

Mariah is looking forward to being able to participate in both her album and movie projects [...] She has been making great recovery progress, and continues to grow stronger every day. Virgin Music Worldwide continues to give its absolute commitment and support to Mariah on every level.

In an interview, Anthony Esposito, a producer of WiseGirls, noted that "when he spent time with Carey during the WiseGirls shoot, it was clear she had been pushing herself to the limit. After a day of shooting on the film, he says Carey would often just keep on working into the night". He also called Carey "a person that never, ever relaxes". Released in 2001, Glitter met to negative reviews and was called one of the worst films ever made. Carey subsequently parted ways with Virgin Records.

=== Onset feud ===
During production for WiseGirls, rumours surfaced of a feud and physical altercation between Carey and American actress Mira Sorvino, the lead actress of the film. Tabloids reported that Carey started the fight by throwing a salt shaker at Sorvino. Both Carey and Sorvino's publicists acknowledged that "words were exchanged" between the two after Carey was late to set but Sorvino's publicists also acknowledge that "the incident was ridiculously blown up and never turned physical". A People article which had quoted WiseGirls producer Billy Blake, stated that the two had "wrestled to the floor". Blake later issued a statement denying knowledge of the incident saying that, he did not "have firsthand information of any altercation between Mariah Carey and Mira Sorvino as [he] was not on the set that day". After Carey was hospitalised, Sorvino stated that,

We had one verbal argument, one day [...] but there was no physicality whatsoever — as if you could really imagine me rolling on the ground and pulling her hair out, as the National Enquirer said [...] I'm very sorry for the recent troubles that she's experiencing. I think she'll come out of it fine. She's a very smart person.

In 2002, once the film's promotion began, Carey stated in an interview for Reuters that, "2001 was chock-full of rumours, so why even address it, it's nonsense". In 2018, Sorvino confirmed on Twitter that Carey did "throw a salt shaker over [her] head" but there was "no wrestling or physical contact".

== Promotion and release ==
For WiseGirls, Carey appeared on MTV Italy and Entertainment Tonight among other channels to promote the film. Anspaugh, Carey, Sorvino and Melora Walters were present at the film's world premiere at the 2002 Sundance Film Festival. The film was released through Cinemax.

== Reception ==
=== Critical reception ===
Upon release, the film received mixed or average reviews. On review aggregator website Rotten Tomatoes, the film has an approval rating of 44% based on 9 reviews. Mick LaSalle of the San Francisco Chronicle stated, "It's a good film - not a classic, but odd, entertaining and authentic". Variety reviewer David Rooney remarked that the film was "directed with very conventional efficiency by David Anspaugh" and that "the drama's script keeps enough surprises up its sleeve to remain entertaining. Its themes of female bonding and friendship suggest a theatrical target of young women, with a more solid afterlife in ancillary". The Hollywood Reporter writer Kirk Honeycutt stated that in the film, "Anspaugh goes for a lively surface but one with a strong emotional undertow". He went on to sat that "WiseGirls can't help suffering a bit from over-familiarity [...] but Anspaugh and his actors bring enough vigor to the enterprise that the film comes off as a well-done genre piece..."

Fox News was critical of Anspaugh's "extremely misguided mob movie" saying that even Carey could not save the "awful, terrible mob stereotypical movie that pales considerably next to The Sopranos and The Godfather" and that the film "raises just about every crude Mafia reference it can think of [...] Nearly every word out of Carey's mouth is the f-word". Nathan Rabin of The A.V. Club criticized the tone and pacing, saying "The film's tone varies wildly from scene to scene, and sometimes even from second to second. That identity crisis especially comes through in the film's performances: Carey is sketch-comedy broad throughout, while Sorvino opts for wan naturalism".

=== Mariah Carey's role ===
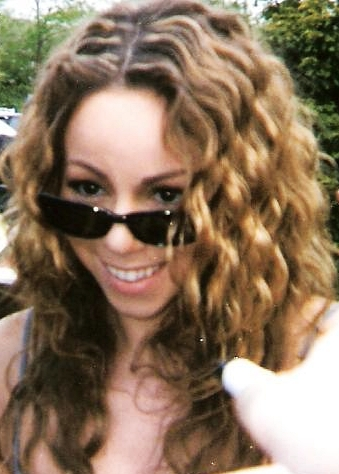
Mariah Carey (pictured) received more praise from critics for her role as Raychel than for her role as Billie Frank in the 2001 film, Glitter

Carey's performance as Raychel was given favorable reviews, with some critics calling it a comeback after her film, Glitter. (Note: As cited by various sources including: Fox News, Tampa Bay Times, Variety, The Hollywood Reporter, and USA Today.) David Rooney from Variety stated that Carey's "second time out as an actress proves luckier than the first [...] downsizing from her disastrous debut headliner "Glitter" to a more modest co-starring role with charm and relaxed assurance". His biggest praise was for Carey saying "by far the most engaging performance [was] Carey, giving trash-talking, husky-voiced Raychel plenty of heart as well as chutzpah and sexy attitude". Fox News also praised Carey's role saying she had found her "forte [...] and now it's her handlers' turn to find more roles like this — wisecracking, world-weary, street-savvy people". Kirk Honeycutt from The Hollywood Reporter noted that "the scathing notices for Glitter will be a forgotten memory [...] once people warm up to Raychel. She's a don't-mess-with-me woman who develops a joyous sense of family in friendship with her fellow waitresses".

Carey responded to the film's reception, saying that "Sometimes you have to go through difficult stuff, either to learn a lesson or maybe reconnect with something that has slipped away a bit. But that's how life is. You may keep getting hit, but you have to just keep on standing up again". In an interview, Carey noted that it was working with Sorvino and Walters which helped her get through filming saying,

This experience was so great and just to have these two amazing actresses working with me and David Anspaugh [director] creating an environment that allowed me to create a character and to allow me to go deep into myself and to do something different and explore a different side of my creativity and I would love to try to continue to do projects that are unexpected like this. Nobody's expecting this.

Producer, Anthony Esposito, stated that he "had such a great experience with Mariah Carey on Wisegirls that [he] wanted to make another film with her". Esposito went on to say that Carey's "performance in WiseGirls is outstanding, with reviews from Sundance praising her work [and that given] the right role, the depth of Mariah's performance will make everyone take notice of her great acting ability". In 2002, Esposito cast Carey in Sweet Science about a "determined boxing manager who drafts an unknown female boxer", but the film never came into fruition.
