= Union Square (film) =

- Film poster
- Directed by: Nancy Savoca
- Written by: Nancy Savoca; Mary Tobler
- Starring: Mira Sorvino; Tammy Blanchard; Patti LuPone; Mike Doyle; Michael Rispoli; Daphne Rubin-Vega; Christopher Backus; Harper Dill; Michael Sirow
- Release dates: September 15, 2011 (Toronto); July 13, 2012 (United States)
- Running time: 80 minutes
- Country: United States
- Language: English

Union Square is a 2011 comedy-drama film directed by Nancy Savoca and starring Mira Sorvino, Tammy Blanchard, Patti LuPone and premiered at the Toronto International Film Festival on September 16, 2011.

== Plot ==
Two sisters have a reunion together. One is about to become married while the other has a stressful life. They visit unforeseen places and construct their worlds together while having a reunion.

== Cast ==
- Mira Sorvino as Lucy
- Mike Doyle as Bill
- Tammy Blanchard as Jenny
- Patti LuPone as Lucia
- Michael Rispoli as Nick
- Christopher Backus as Andy
- Daphne Rubin-Vega as Sara
- Michael Sirow as Jay (voice)
- Harper Dill as Trish
- Holden Backus as Mike
