= Drowning (film) =

- Directed by: Melora Walters
- Written by: Melora Walters
- Produced by: Sergio Rizzuto; Albert Chi; Rory Rooney; Melora Walters; Jerry Ying
- Starring: Melora Walters; Gil Bellows; Jay Mohr; Joanna Going; Steven Swadling; Sergio Rizzuto; Mira Sorvino; Christopher Backus; Sarah Butler; Jim O'Heir
- Cinematography: Christopher Soos
- Edited by: Alexis Evelyn
- Production companies: Potato Eater Productions; Room in the Sky Films; Hero LA; Eight Trick Pony
- Distributed by: Gravitas Ventures
- Release date: October 2019 (Rome Film Festival)
- Country: United States
- Language: English

Drowning is a 2019 drama film written and directed by Melora Walters and starring Walters, Gil Bellows, Jay Mohr, Joanna Going, Steven Swadling, Sergio Rizzuto, and Mira Sorvino. Inspired by real life events experienced by Walters, the film recounts the story of a mother (Walters) coming to terms with her emotions as her only son (Rizzuto) is deployed to war.

== Cast ==
- Melora Walters as Rose
- Gil Bellows as Frank
- Jay Mohr as Henry
- Joanna Going as Catherine
- Steven Swadling as Giovanni
- Sergio Rizzuto as Charlie
- Mira Sorvino as Mary
- Christopher Backus as Peter
- Sarah Butler as Alicia
- Jim O'Heir as Tim

== Production ==
Filming started in Los Angeles in January 2019 and completed principal photography in 9 days.

== Release ==
Drowning made its world debut at the Rome Film Festival 2019 and concluded its festival run in Italy at the Marateale International Film Festival 2020, where Melora Walters took home “Best Director” and Mira Sorvino was honored with the “La Marateale International Award” for her career and her commitment to the advancement of women in film. The film was released publicly in North America on October 20, 2020, by Gravitas Ventures.

== Reception ==
The film was reviewed by Common Sense Media and MadMass Magazine.
