= Deadline (2009 film) =

- Official teaser poster
- Directed by: Sean McConville
- Written by: Sean McConville
- Produced by: Roger Betterton
- Starring: Brittany Murphy; Tammy Blanchard; Thora Birch; Marc Blucas
- Cinematography: Ross Richardson
- Edited by: Chris Levitus
- Music by: Carlos José Alvarez
- Production companies: Enso Entertainment; KRU Studios; Films In Motion
- Distributed by: First Look Pictures
- Release dates: October 5, 2009 (United Kingdom); December 1, 2009 (United States)
- Running time: 89 minutes
- Countries: United States; Malaysia
- Language: English

Deadline is a 2009 psychological horror film directed by Sean McConville and starring Brittany Murphy and Thora Birch.

== Plot ==
Alice Evans needs to complete a screenplay, which she has not finished due to a psychological breakdown after her boyfriend, Ben, tried to kill her. With the deadline for the screenplay approaching, she accepts an offer by a producer friend to let her stay in a Victorian-style home he has recently purchased, so she can focus on her work. She insists on staying there alone, and her friend Rebecca reluctantly agrees and leaves her there.

Alice begins to hear strange noises in the house and becomes convinced the house is haunted by the ghost of a murdered woman. She begins searching the house and finds a collection of videotapes in the attic featuring a mysterious young couple, Lucy and David Woods. At first the tapes just show the couple lovingly talking about their new baby and life together in the house. However, as the tapes progress, the more disturbed David grows. He becomes convinced Lucy is seeing someone else and that the baby may not be his, even though she assures him she's never been with anyone else. One tape shows him filming Lucy as she sleeps muttering "she looks like an angel."

Alice also watches one of her own tapes of herself and Rebecca (before Ben tried to kill her) and it is strongly implied she and Rebecca are more than just friends. Alice keeps watching the video tapes of the Woods and asks Rebecca to do research on the couple for her. Feeling worried about Alice, Rebecca offers to come visit, but Alice insists she is fine. As she keeps watching the tapes, we learn the reason Ben tried to kill Alice: like Lucy Woods, Alice was pregnant and, like David Woods, Ben became convinced the baby wasn't his. Also like David Woods, Ben tried to drown Alice in the bathtub. She survived, but lost the baby. This is why Alice feels so connected to Lucy.

She starts to see the ghost of Lucy Woods around the house. When Alice gets to the last tape, she sees that David did kill Lucy by drowning her in the tub and then hanged himself. Alice then gets a call from Ben, who apologizes for what he did to her. During the call, Alice sees a shadow in the house and becomes convinced Ben is inside with her, and that he has been responsible for everything that has been happening while she was there, but he insists he is in Boston with his mother. Still, Alice is afraid and starts to run away, but at that point, she sees the end of the tape which shows David Woods actually survived his hanging when his mother cut him down just in time. His mother then reports David and Lucy missing. Alice comes face to face with David Woods inside the house. He calls her "Lucy" and thinks Alice is his wife. He catches her and tries to drown her in the bathtub, but then he sees the ghost of his dead wife, Lucy, standing beside him. This scares him so much, he falls backward over the stair railing and dies. Lucy's ghost then lets the water out of the bathtub and saves Alice's life.

Later, Rebecca comes over and finds Alice still lying in the tub muttering about the ghost. Rebecca pulls her out of the tub, and as she dries her off, she finds the screen play that Alice has been working on all this time. She discovers it is word for word the entire story Alice has been telling her; it is now clear that everything Alice saw was all in her head. Rebecca then promises she will never again leave Alice alone and puts her to bed. Rebecca goes downstairs where she finds a video camera on the floor where the body of David Woods would have been. She picks it up and watches a tape Alice shot of Rebecca sleeping that looks exactly like the earlier scene shown of David shooting Lucy as she slept, right down to Alice saying she looks like an angel.

== Cast ==
- Brittany Murphy as Alice Evans
- Thora Birch as Lucy Woods
- Tammy Blanchard as Rebecca
- Marc Blucas as David Woods
- Claudia Troll as David's Mother
- Michael Piscitelli as Ben

== Production ==
Starting in June 2008, the independently-financed film began principal photography in Louisiana. It was the first English-language feature financed by KRU Studios, and was originally scheduled for a mid-2009 release. KRU handled post-production, visual effects and distribution in Asia.

== Release ==
The film premiered to DVD in the United Kingdom on October 5, 2009, and in the United States on December 1, 2009. After Murphy's death on December 20, 2009, Redbox recalled film posters which were displayed on kiosks around the country. The poster depicted Murphy's character sitting in bathtub with a dead version of the other female lead character's reflection in the mirror.

== Reception ==
In her review for Film Thrills, Deirdre Crimmins said that "the script is awful. Not only is the dialogue awkward and unnatural, and the plot impossible to follow, but there is no character development and all of the characters act irrationally."

== Soundtrack ==
MovieScore Media released Carlos José Alvarez's score for the film on July 27, 2010. The album was dedicated to Brittany Murphy's memory.

1. Main Titles 2:06
2. Lucy and David 1:10
3. Somebody Died Here 3:05
4. The House 1:51
5. First Morning 1:07
6. Haunted Piano :51
7. Taking a Bath 1:13
8. An Attempt to Escape 2:24
9. Medication 1:52
10. Transformation 2:27
11. What If Ben Finds Out 1:33
12. But I Belong to You 2:08
13. Miscarriage 2:21
14. The Drowning 5:00
15. The Burial 3:44
16. Following Lucy 1:03
17. Burial Site 4:02
18. Lucy Saves Alice 2:16
19. Set Free 1:25
20. Deadline (Suite for Orchestra) 6:01
