= Norma Jean & Marilyn =

1996 television film directed by Tim Fywell

- Promotional poster
- Genre: Biographical drama
- Based on: Goddess, the Secret Lives of Marilyn Monroe by Anthony Summers
- Written by: Jill Isaacs
- Directed by: Tim Fywell
- Starring: Ashley Judd; Mira Sorvino; Josh Charles; Ron Rifkin; David Dukes; Peter Dobson; Lindsay Crouse
- Music by: Christopher Young
- Country of origin: United States
- Original language: English

Production
- Executive producer: Marvin Worth
- Producer: Guy Riedel
- Cinematography: John Thomas
- Editor: Glenn Farr
- Running time: 132 minutes
- Production company: Marvin Worth Productions

Original release
- Network: HBO
- Release: May 18, 1996

Norma Jean & Marilyn is a 1996 American biographical drama television film directed by Tim Fywell and written by Jill Isaacs, based on the 1985 book Goddess, the Secret Lives of Marilyn Monroe by Anthony Summers. The film stars Ashley Judd as Norma Jean Dougherty and Mira Sorvino as Marilyn Monroe. It premiered on HBO on May 18, 1996.

The tagline for the highly fictionalized film summarizes the plot: "Marilyn Monroe was our fantasy. Norma Jean was her reality." In dream-like scenes, Monroe and her former self appear together, with Norma Jean sometimes taunting Monroe. The original music score was composed by Christopher Young.

The film was nominated for five Primetime Emmy Awards and two Golden Globe Awards, each including for both lead actresses.

== Cast ==
- Ashley Judd as Norma Jean Dougherty
  - Marianne Davis as Young Norma Jean Dougherty
  - Kelsey Mulrooney as Child Norma Jean Dougherty
- Mira Sorvino as Marilyn Monroe
- Josh Charles as Eddie Jordan
- Sam Shamshak as Ted Lewis
- Ron Rifkin as Johnny Hyde
- David Dukes as Arthur Miller
- Peter Dobson as Joe DiMaggio
- Taylor Nichols as Fred Karger
- John Rubinstein as Darryl F. Zanuck
- Allan Corduner as Billy Wilder
- Lindsay Crouse as Natasha Lytess
- Dennis Bowen as Tom Kelley
- Nancy Linehan Charles as Bette Davis
- Jeffrey Combs as Montgomery Clift
- Steven Culp as Robert F. Kennedy
- Lou Cutell as Henry T. Weinstein
- Dana Goldstone as Lee Strasberg
- Micole Mercurio as Mozelle Hyde
- John Apicella as Milton R. Krasner
- Kevin Bourland as David March
- Michael O'Neill as Mr. Kimmel
- Robert Alan Beuth as Commissary Photographer

== Plot ==
The film begins by announcing the death of Marilyn Monroe, recognizing her immense popularity, but speculating that she died of a suicidal overdose. The film then reverts to an earlier time, in which Norma Jean is attending church and the pastor offers to recognize those who wish to proclaim fidelity. Her family suggests that she go to the front of the church for recognition and she does so, however, Norma Jean is nude; the churchgoers do not notice or recognize this. She then describes this as a dream to Eddie Jordan, a lifeguard at the club that is also the location of her modeling agency. Eddie offers to date Norma Jean, and he tells her that his uncle, Ted Lewis, is performing that night. She grabs his hand and puts it inside of her robe, so he could feel her heart beating with excitement. Norma Jean subsequently takes off her robe and swimsuit and dives in for a swim; Eddie dives in after her. Norma Jean insists on meeting Ted (catch phrase “Is everybody happy?”); she slips Ted a napkin with her name and phone number on it. She later tells Eddie that she loves him, but that she would have sex with Bela Lugosi to get ahead in show business.

The film shifts to an even earlier time, when she was a young preteen, living with foster parents, portraying the child abuse that Norma Jean experienced at several points during the film. She attempted to contact her father but was unsuccessful.

Back to her modeling career, Norma Jean has her natural brown hair colored a reddish blonde. She used Ted Lewis to influence Johnny Hyde to represent her. At this point, she begins abusing dangerous narcotics to wake up and go to sleep.

Norma Jean posed for a male photographer and a female assistant, who said she could use a false name for the photo session. She posed nude on a red velvet sheet.

Darryl Zanuck hired Norma Jean for 20th Century Fox, but advised Johnny Hyde that while her body was fine, her face required work. She then got rhinoplasty and chin augmentation, changed her hair color to platinum blonde and changed her name to Marilyn Monroe at the studio’s request. At this time, both Norma Jean and Marilyn Monroe were both simultaneously in the film, but only Marilyn sees Norma Jean, other people present do not see Norma Jean. Marilyn speaks in a breathy vocal range, while Norma Jean continued to speak in a natural voice. Norma Jean coached Marilyn in her acting career, often berating her. Marilyn continued to see Eddie Jordan.

Marilyn's marriage to major league baseball player Joe DiMaggio was fraught with disagreements. He was expecting a typical wife to make dinner for him. During the scene in The Seven Year Itch over the grate with the wind machine blowing up her skirt, the director asked for another set of panties to be put on and DiMaggio was disgusted, slugging a bystander who had made a negative comment to him.

Her marriage to playwright Arthur Miller was successful at first, but their relationship deteriorated over time, ending after the movie The Misfits. She lost Miller’s child while performing in that film.

Skipping out on the movie Something's Got to Give, she performed “Happy Birthday to You” for President John F. Kennedy. Norma Jean put on Marilyn’s dress, then ripped it up. A seamstress sewed the dress back up and she was able to perform the song, even though she was late in the scheduled program. The 20th Century Fox studio fired her for claiming she was too ill to act in her movie, yet she flew to Madison Square Garden in New York City to perform for the President.

Near the end of the film, she tells Eddie Jordan that 20th Century Fox had rehired her at an increased salary and that she knows how to make men love her. She then demonstrates by taking down her top. Eddie is unimpressed and leaves her. Shortly after, after a bout of pills and drinking, she is found passed out and is put in an ambulance. During the trip, the attendant puts a sheet over her head, as she died before she reached the hospital.

== Production ==
A cherry-adorned dress Sorvino wore in the film, from The Misfits (1961), was actually worn by Monroe during the filming of the original film. It was provided to the production by designer and cinema costume collector Gene London.

While filming the movie, Sorvino acquired a small dog whom she named Deer, after its uncanny resemblance to a deer. She adored the dog, and kept it in her trailer while filming, so it would be there waiting for her between shots. Once, while filming at the International School of Los Angeles, in the Los Feliz area of Los Angeles, a crew member inadvertently let the dog escape while cleaning Sorvino's trailer as she was on-set filming a shot. The school was located on a small hill, and Deer apparently bolted down the hill, and into the residential neighborhood below. Sorvino was inconsolable, and returned to the location nightly, cruising slowly through the area, calling out for her lost pet, and posting reward notices. Security Officers who worked overnight shifts on the set were advised of the situation, and were told to be alert to the possibility of Sorvino's presence, and to keep an eye out for the dog, who may return to the location. Several of the officers and other crew members even began bringing collars, leashes, dog carriers and treats with them to work, hoping to capture it, but the crew moved on to the next filming location, and it is believed that Deer was never found.

== Critical reception ==
Norma Jean & Marilyn received mixed reviews from critics. On the review aggregator website Rotten Tomatoes, the film holds an approval rating of 60% based on 5 reviews, with a rating average of 4.8/10.

== Accolades ==
Year	Award	Category	Nominee(s)	Result	Ref.
1996	Primetime Emmy Awards	Outstanding Lead Actress in a Miniseries or a Special	Ashley Judd	Nominated	
1996	Primetime Emmy Awards	Outstanding Lead Actress in a Miniseries or a Special	Mira Sorvino	Nominated	
1996	Primetime Emmy Awards	Outstanding Cinematography for a Miniseries or a Special	John Thomas	Nominated	
1996	Primetime Emmy Awards	Outstanding Hairstyling for a Miniseries or a Special	Andre Blaise	Nominated	
1996	Primetime Emmy Awards	Outstanding Music Composition for a Miniseries or a Special	Christopher Young	Nominated	
1997	Golden Globe Awards	Best Actress in a Miniseries or Motion Picture Made for Television	Ashley Judd	Nominated	
1997	Golden Globe Awards	Best Actress in a Miniseries or Motion Picture Made for Television	Mira Sorvino	Nominated	
