= Christopher Backus =

American actor, director, screenwriter

- Born: Christopher Paul Backus; October 30, 1981 (age 45); Mission Viejo, California, U.S.
- Occupations: Actor; director; screenwriter
- Years active: 2004–present
- Spouse: Mira Sorvino (m. 2004)
- Children: 4

Christopher Backus is an American actor, director and screenwriter. Backus made his television debut in NBC's Will & Grace, followed by landing roles in The O.C., Life on Mars, It's Always Sunny in Philadelphia, Sons of Anarchy, The Mentalist, Perception, and The Last Templar. He also appeared in films such as Redline starring Eddie Griffin and 3 Days Gone directed by Scott McCullough.

== Early life and education ==
Backus grew up in Kansas City, Kansas. His mother, Teryl Backus, is a retired colonel in the United States Marine Corps, and his father, Terry Backus, was a lawyer who died when Christopher was a child. He has one sister, Michele.

== Career ==
Backus moved with friend Rob McElhenney from New York City to Los Angeles during pilot season of 2003. Shortly after arriving, Backus landed his first role in Benjamin Splits, while McElhenney developed the sitcom It's Always Sunny in Philadelphia. After landing supporting roles in NBC's hit show Will & Grace and Fox's The O.C., Backus starred opposite Dominique Swain in Nick Vallelonga's All In. He returned to television in Malik Bader's HUGE in which he portrayed a struggling frontman of an indie rock band. He starred in 3 Days Gone along with Patrick J. Adams, Nothing Personal with Paz de la Huerta, and Elevator with John Getz and Anita Briem.

Backus returned to television to play the leader of the Weather Underground in ABC's period drama Life on Mars, then he reteamed with director Nick Vallelonga on a western with Michael Biehn and James Russo, Yellow Rock.

In 2011, the feature film Union Square, co-written and directed by the Sundance Film Festival's Grand Jury Award Winner, Nancy Savoca, was premiered at the Toronto Film Festival. In it, Backus appears alongside Mira Sorvino, Patti Lupone, Tammy Blanchard, Mike Doyle, and Michael Rispoli.

In summer 2011, Backus appeared as Marlene Dietrich in My Fair Lidy.

In 2012, he starred as Marcus in Among Friends, directed by "scream queen" Danielle Harris.

Backus was set to direct a thriller titled The Sessionist, but dropped out of the project due to creative differences.

== Personal life ==
Backus met Mira Sorvino at a friend's charades party in August 2003. On June 11, 2004, they married in a private civil ceremony at the Santa Barbara, California, courthouse, then later had a hilltop ceremony in Capri, Italy. The couple have four children. He has also starred in films with Sorvino such as Indiscretion and Mothers and Daughters.

== Filmography ==
=== Film ===
Year	Title	Role	Notes
2006	All In	Pete	
2007	Redline	Tony Nefuse	
2008	3 Days Gone	Lucas Snow	Direct-to-video
2010	Hard Breakers	Jesse	
2010	Mineville	Vince	
2011	Union Square	Andy	
2011	Yellow Rock	Cobb	
2011	Elevator	Don Handley	
2012	Besties	Justin	
2012	Among Friends	Marcus	
2015	The SpongeBob Movie: Sponge Out of Water	Burger Beard Senior	Uncredited
2015	Chloe and Theo	Juju Joe	
2015	My Fair Lidy	Lidy / Marlene Dietrich	
2016	Indiscretion	Victor Bernard	
2016	Mothers and Daughters	Sebastian	
2016	Displacement	Brian Chance	
2016	A Christmas in New York	Jack Livingston	
2018	A Dog and Pony Show	John	
2018	Waterlily Jaguar	Jackson	
2019	Beneath the Leaves	Matt Tresner	
2019	Drowning	Peter	
2021	Rogue Hostage	Eagan Raize	
2024	Dirty Angels	Travis	

=== Television ===
Year	Title	Role	Notes
2004	Will & Grace	Adam	Episode: "Looking for Mr. Good Enough"
2005	The O.C.	Curtis	Episode: "The Brothers Grim"
2008	Huge	Tommy	1 episode
2009	Life on Mars	Rodney Slaven	Episode: "Revenge of Broken Jaw"
2009	The Last Templar	Jay CIA Agent	2 episodes
2011	It's Always Sunny in Philadelphia	Bobby	Episode: "The Gang Goes to the Jersey Shore"
2012	The Mentalist	Vincent	Episode: "Pink Champagne on Ice"
2012	Perception	Aaron Bauer	Episode: "Messenger"
2013	A Mother's Rage	Kelly	Television film
2014	Deliverance Creek	Jasper Gatlin	Television film
2014	Sons of Anarchy	Adam 'Greensleeves' Greenblatt	Episode: "Greensleeves"
2015	Workaholics	Water Guy	Episode: "Front Yard Wrestling"
2016	Underground	Jeremiah Johnson	4 episodes
2016	Hell on Wheels	George Armstrong Custer	Episode: "Done"
2016	Roadies	Rick Bayless	8 episodes
2017	Bosch	Woody Woodrow	5 episodes
2019	Big Little Lies	Joe	2 episodes
2019	Jett	Bennie	9 episodes
2019	Mindhunter	Tex Watson	Episode #2.5
2021	Truth Be Told	Holt Rollins	Episode #2.1
2021	Blackout	Danny	3 episodes
2022	Black Bird	Young Jim Keene	2 episodes
2025	NCIS: Origins	Abe Pruitt	Season 2 Episode 1 "The Funky Bunch"
