= Mira Sorvino =

American actress (born 1967)

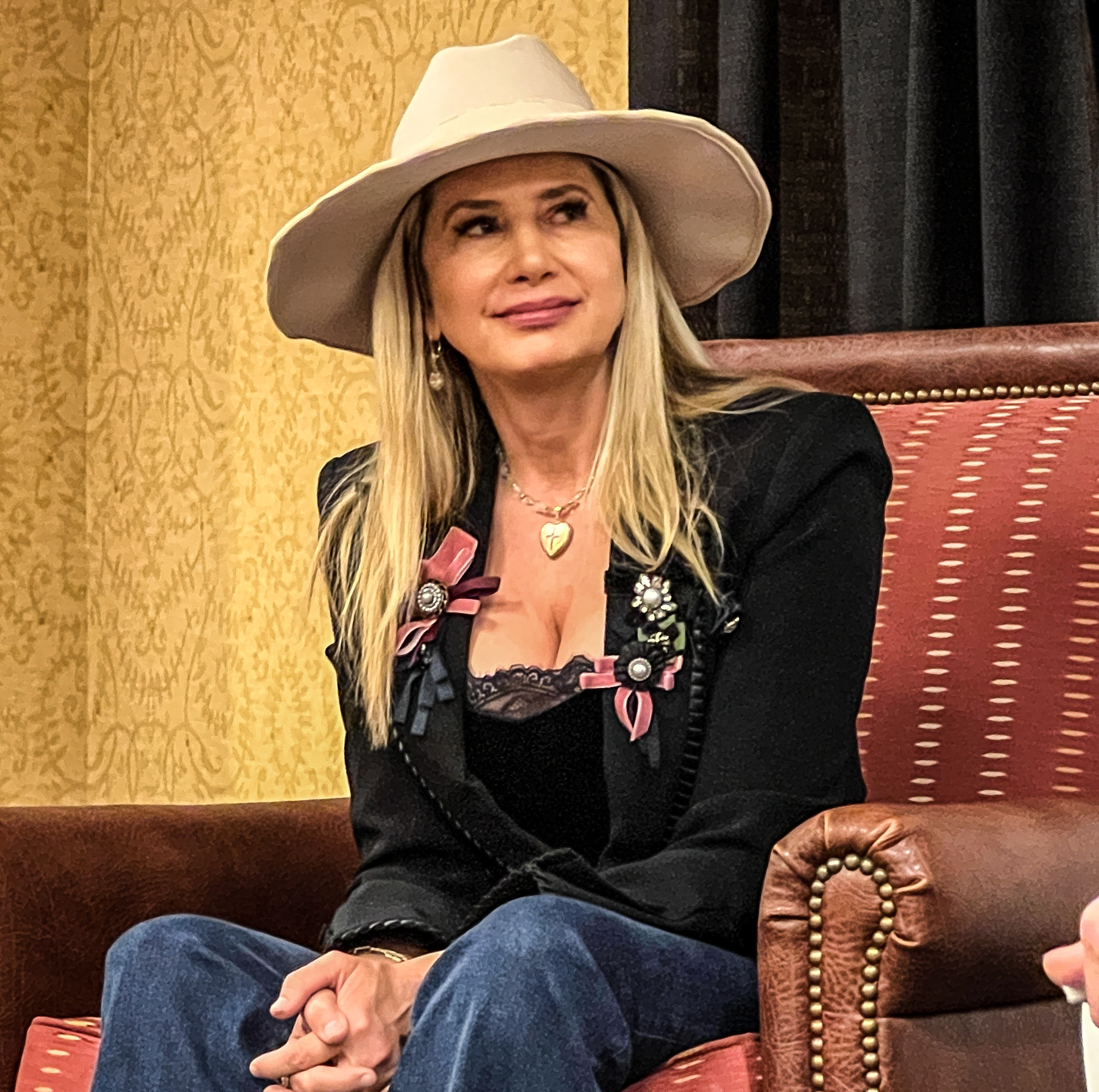
- Sorvino in 2025
- Born: Mira Katherine Sorvino; September 28, 1967 (age 59); New York City, New York, U.S.
- Education: Harvard University (AB)
- Occupation: Actress
- Years active: 1985–present
- Spouse: Christopher Backus (m. 2004)
- Children: 4
- Father: Paul Sorvino
- Relatives: Michael Sorvino (brother)
- Awards: Full list

Mira Katherine Sorvino (/ˈmiːrə sɔːrˈviːnoʊ/; born September 28, 1967) is an American actress. She rose to stardom with her performance as a sex worker in the comedy film Mighty Aphrodite (1995), which won her both an Academy Award and a Golden Globe for Best Supporting Actress.

Sorvino also starred in the films Romy and Michele's High School Reunion (1997), Mimic (1997), Lulu on the Bridge (1998), The Replacement Killers (1998), Summer of Sam (1999), Gods and Generals (2003), Like Dandelion Dust (2009), and Sound of Freedom (2023). For her work in television, she was nominated for a Primetime Emmy Award for Outstanding Lead Actress in a Limited Series or Movie for her portrayal of Marilyn Monroe in Norma Jean & Marilyn (1996) and nominated twice for a Golden Globe for Best Actress – Miniseries or Television Film for her performance as Detective Kate Morozov and for her leading role in Human Trafficking (2005).

== Early life ==
Sorvino was born on September 28, 1967, in Manhattan, New York City, to Lorraine Ruth Davis, a drama therapist for Alzheimer's disease patients and former actress, and Paul Sorvino, an actor and film director. She has two siblings, Michael Sorvino and Amanda. She is of Italian descent on her father's side.

She was raised in Tenafly, New Jersey, where she wrote and acted in backyard plays with her childhood friend Hope Davis, and in theater productions at Dwight-Englewood School. As a child, she was strongly influenced to pursue social causes by her mother, who participated in the 1963 March on Washington.

Sorvino excelled in high school and was accepted into Harvard University. She studied for one year as an exchange student with CIEE in Nanjing, China, where she studied Mandarin Chinese. In 1989, she graduated from Harvard magna cum laude with a degree in East Asian studies. She also helped found the Harvard-Radcliffe Veritones, one of Harvard's co-ed a cappella groups, in 1985.

== Career ==
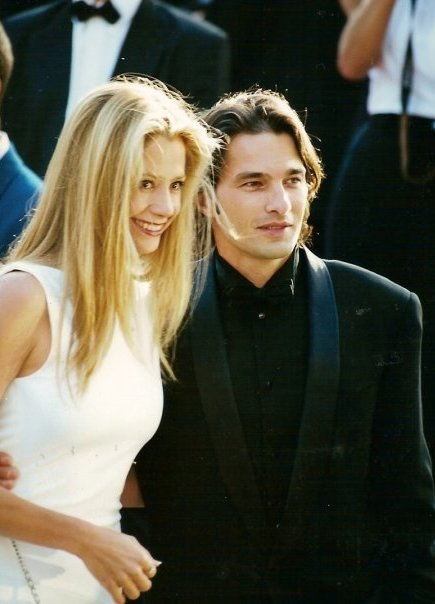
Mira Sorvino and Olivier Martinez at the 2000 Cannes Film Festival

Sorvino's first major screen appearance was in the teen television series Swans Crossing, where she appeared in six episodes. When the 1993 film Amongst Friends entered preproduction, she was hired as third assistant director, then promoted to casting director, then to assistant producer, and finally offered a lead role. The positive reviews she received led to more acting opportunities.

After supporting roles in Robert Redford's Quiz Show and Whit Stillman's Barcelona, she was cast in Woody Allen's Mighty Aphrodite (1995). Her portrayal of a happy-go-lucky prostitute made her a star, winning her an Academy Award and Golden Globe for Best Supporting Actress. Although the film brought her international recognition, she described its shooting as extremely stressful: "I was absolutely neurotic doing Mighty Aphrodite," she recalled. "Every night brought a new nervous breakdown. I'd cry and talk to God, I was so nervous. Then the next day, I'd show up and do my scenes."

Her other credits include Romy and Michele's High School Reunion with Lisa Kudrow, At First Sight with Val Kilmer, and Spike Lee's Summer of Sam. She portrayed Marilyn Monroe for the 1996 HBO film Norma Jean & Marilyn, for which she was nominated for a Golden Globe; and had the lead role in Guillermo del Toro's horror film Mimic. In 1995, she portrayed Conchita Closson in the BBC miniseries The Buccaneers, based on Edith Wharton's last novel. She starred as Daisy Buchanan in the 2000 television film The Great Gatsby.

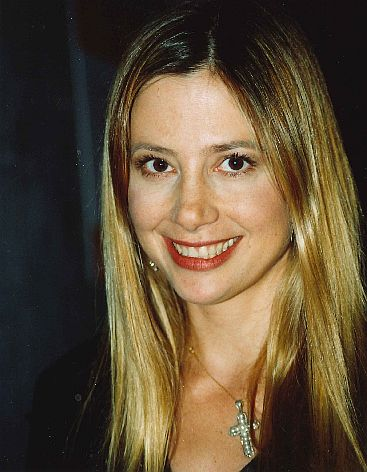
Sorvino on Capitol Hill, Washington, D.C., in 2001

In 2002, Sorvino appeared as the lead in Triumph of Love, an adaptation of the 1732 Marivaux play. That year she also starred in WiseGirls alongside Mariah Carey and Melora Walters. In 2006, she received a Golden Globe nomination for her role as an Immigration and Customs Enforcement agent in the Lifetime film Human Trafficking. She had a supporting role in the drama Reservation Road (2007) with Mark Ruffalo.

In February 2008, she guest-starred as psychiatrist Cate Milton in the "Frozen" episode of the medical television drama House. Plans to make hers a recurring character were interrupted by the writers' strike.

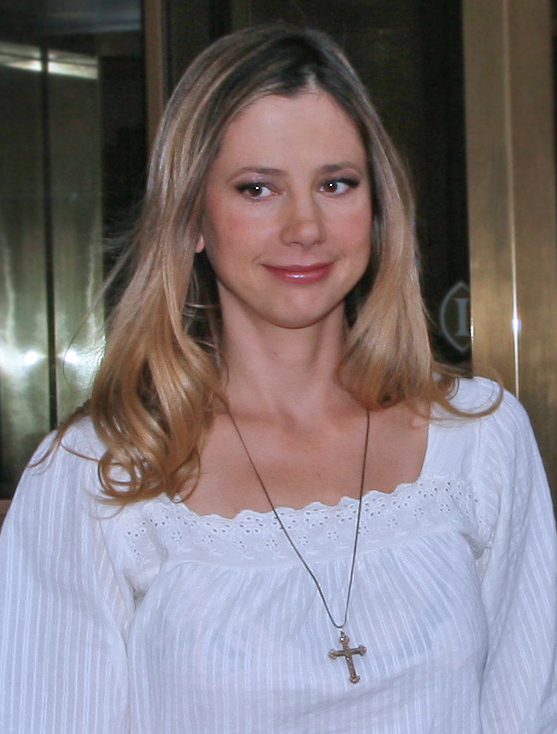
Sorvino at the 2007 Toronto International Film Festival

She starred in Attack on Leningrad (2009), Multiple Sarcasms (2010) with Timothy Hutton and Stockard Channing, and Nancy Savoca's Union Square (2012), with Patti Lupone and Tammy Blanchard. The film premiered at the Toronto International Film Festival to good reviews. In the same year, Sorvino played the mother of the lead in the film adaptation of Wendy Mass's popular children's book Jeremy Fink and the Meaning of Life.

In 2014, she reappeared as Head Detective Betsy Brannigan on the final season of Psych, and on the fourth season of Falling Skies as John Pope's love interest, Sara. Sorvino also joined the cast of the television series Intruders, playing the role of Amy Whelan. In 2016, she appeared in the Netflix series Lady Dynamite as an actor working on a sitcom pilot named White Trash. In 2018, Sorvino played the role of Amy in the psychological thriller Look Away, alongside Jason Isaacs and India Eisley.

In 2019, Sorvino was cast in the Netflix miniseries Hollywood as an actor whose career stalled out after a relationship with a studio head.

In 2022, she played a supporting role in Sound of Freedom, a film about human trafficking in South America.

In May 2025, Sorvino revealed that a sequel to Romy and Michele's High School Reunion was in the works at 20th Century Studios. Sorvino made her Broadway debut as Roxie Hart in the musical Chicago in September 2025 at the Ambassador Theatre.

== Personal life ==
Between 1996 and 1998, Mira Sorvino was romantically involved with director Quentin Tarantino, who was her escort to the Academy Awards ceremony where she won Best Supporting Actress for Mighty Aphrodite.

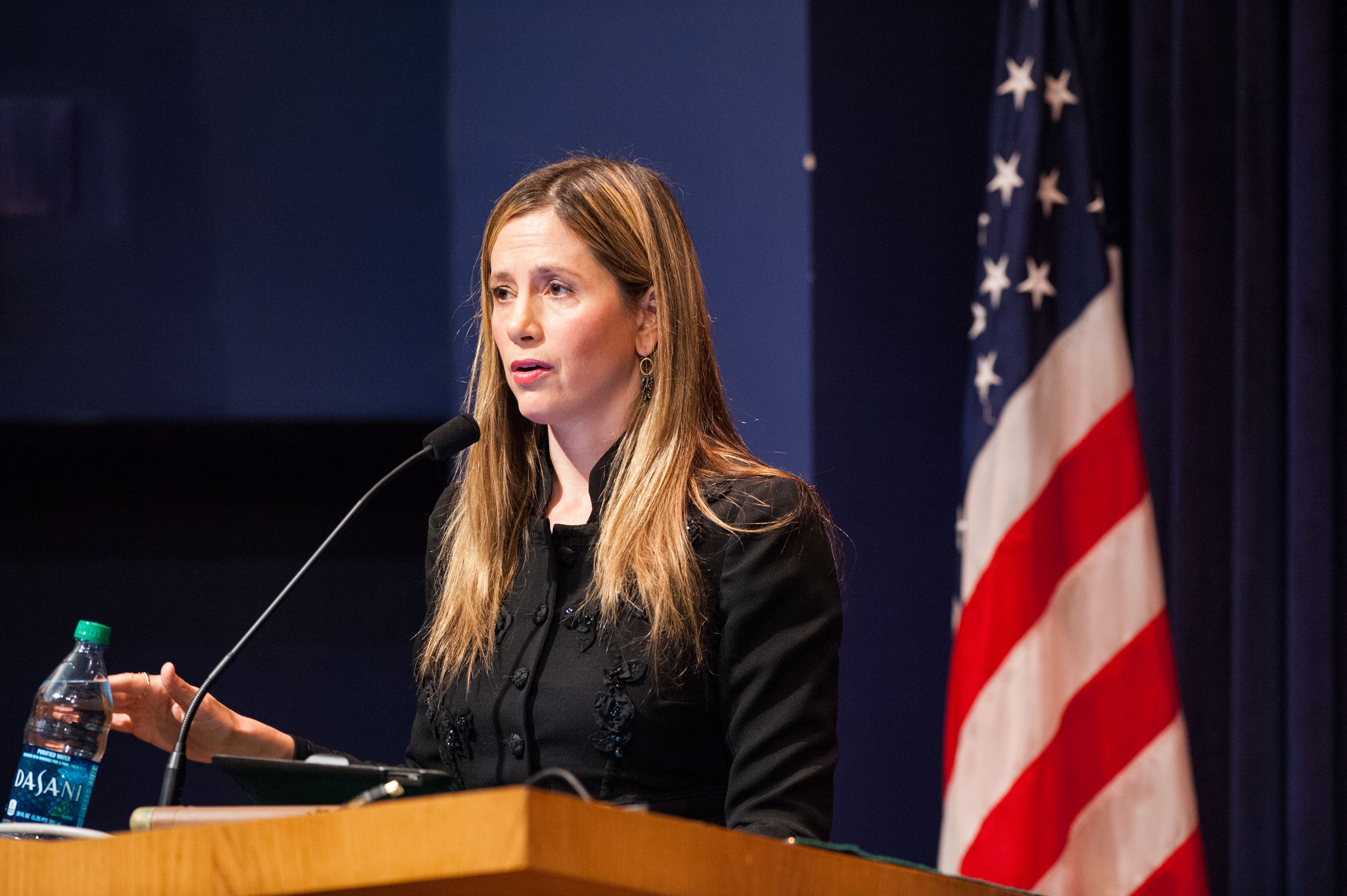
Sorvino at the Anti-Human-Trafficking Symposium in Washington, D.C., January 30, 2013

Sorvino met actor Christopher Backus at a friend's charades party in August 2003. On June 11, 2004, they married in a private civil ceremony at the Santa Barbara, California, courthouse, then later had a hilltop ceremony in Capri, Italy. They have four children: two daughters and two sons. They have also starred in films together, including Indiscretion and Mothers and Daughters.

In honor of Sorvino's role as Susan Tyler, an entomologist who investigated deadly insect mutations in the film Mimic, a compound that is excreted as a defense mechanism by the sunburst diving beetle was named mirasorvone by the entomologist Thomas Eisner who discovered it.

In September 2014, Sorvino gave a wide-ranging interview on The Nerdist Podcast, where she discussed her education, living in China, and her varied interests.

Sorvino was raised in her mother's Episcopalian faith and has publicly identified as a Christian. In 2023, she converted to Catholicism. She resides with her family in Los Angeles, California.

In 2017, Sorvino came out publicly about the sexual harassment she endured from producer Harvey Weinstein and believes her career was damaged after she rebuffed Weinstein's advances. According to Peter Jackson, Weinstein blocked Sorvino and Ashley Judd (her co-star from Norma Jean and Marilyn), another of his alleged victims, from being considered for parts in The Lord of the Rings films. In 2019, she also made public that she was a date rape victim.

=== Activism ===
Sorvino has been affiliated with Amnesty International since 2004. In 2006 she was honored with their Artist of Conscience Award, given to those who have made longstanding philanthropic and humanist efforts. From 2009 to 2012 she was a United Nations Goodwill ambassador for combatting human trafficking, and has lobbied Congress to help abolish the practice in Darfur.

== Filmography ==
=== Film ===
Year	Title	Role	Notes
1985	The Stuff	Factory Worker	Uncredited
1993	Amongst Friends	Laura	
1993	New York Cop	Maria	
1994	Quiz Show	Sandra Goodwin	
1994	Barcelona	Marta Ferrer	
1995	Sweet Nothing	Monika	
1995	Mighty Aphrodite	Linda Ash	Academy Award for Best Supporting Actress
1995	Blue in the Face	Young Lady	
1996	Beautiful Girls	Sharon Cassidy	
1996	Tales of Erotica	Teresa	Short; The Dutch Master
1996	Tarantella	Diane	
1997	Romy and Michele's High School Reunion	Romy White	
1997	Mimic	Dr. Susan Tyler	
1998	The Replacement Killers	Meg Coburn	
1998	Lulu on the Bridge	Celia Burns	
1998	Too Tired to Die	Death / Jean	
1998	Free Money	Karen Polarski	
1999	At First Sight	Amy Benic	
1999	Summer of Sam	Dionna	
2001	The Grey Zone	Dina	
2001	Triumph of Love	The Princess	
2002	WiseGirls	Meg Kennedy	
2002	Semana Santa	Maria Delgado	
2002	Between Strangers	Natalia Bauer	
2003	Gods and Generals	Fanny Chamberlain	
2004	The Final Cut	Delila	
2007	Reservation Road	Ruth	
2009	Like Dandelion Dust	Wendy Porter	
2009	Sweet Flame	Sheila	
2009	Attack on Leningrad	Kate Davis	
2010	Multiple Sarcasms	Cari	
2010	The Presence	The Woman	
2011	Angels Crest	Angie	
2012	Union Square	Lucy	
2012	The Trouble with Cali	The Balletmaster	
2012	Smitty	Amanda	
2012	Trade of Innocents	Claire Becker	
2013	Space Warriors	Sally Hawkins	
2014	Perfect Sisters	Linda	
2014	Frozen in Time	Carol Purtle	Direct to video
2015	Quitters	May Rayman	
2015	Do You Believe?	Samantha	
2015	Chloe and Theo	Monica	
2016	Exposed	Janine Cullen	
2016	Mothers and Daughters	Georgina	
2016	The Red Maple Leaf	Marianna Palermo	
2017	6 Below: Miracle on the Mountain	Susan LeMarque	
2018	Waterlily Jaguar	Helen	
2018	Look Away	Amy Brennan	
2019	Beneath the Leaves	Detective Erica Shotwell	
2019	Stuber	Captain Angie McHenry	
2019	Badland	Sarah Cooke	
2019	Drowning	Mary	
2020	Butter	Marian	
2020	Most Guys Are Losers	Amy	
2021	The Girl Who Believes in Miracles	Bonnie Hopkins	
2021	East of the Mountains	Renee Givens	
2021	Hero Mode	Kate Mayfield	
2021	Crime Story	Nick Wallace	
2021	After We Fell	Carol Young	
2022	After Ever Happy	Carol Young	
2022	Lamborghini: The Man Behind the Legend	Annita	
2023	Sound of Freedom	Katherine Ballard	
2024	The Image of You	Alexia	
2025	Signing Tony Raymond	Sandra Henderson	
2027	Romy and Michele 2	Romy White	Filming

=== Television ===
Year	Title	Role	Notes
1991–1992	Guiding Light	Julie Camaletti	Temporary replacement for Jocelyn Seagrave
1992	Swans Crossing	Sophia Eva McCormick De Castro	Recurring role
1994	Parallel Lives	Matty Derosa	TV movie
1995	The Buccaneers	Conchita Closson	5 episodes
1996	Norma Jean & Marilyn	Marilyn Monroe	TV movie
2000	The Great Gatsby	Daisy Buchanan	TV movie
2003	Will & Grace	Diane	Episode: "Last Ex to Brooklyn"
2005	Human Trafficking	Kate Morozov	Miniseries
2006	Covert One: The Hades Factor	Randi Russell	TV movie
2008	House	Dr. Cate Milton	Episode: "Frozen"
2009	The Last Templar	Tess Chaykin	TV movie
2012	Finding Mrs. Claus	Mrs. Claus	TV movie
2014	Psych	Head Detective Betsy Brannigan	3 episodes
2014–2015	Falling Skies	Sara	Recurring role
2014	Intruders	Amy Whelan	Main role
2015	Stalker	Vicki Gregg	Recurring role
2016	Indiscretion	Veronica Lewis	TV movie
2016	A Christmas to Remember	Jennifer Wade / Maggie	TV movie
2016–2017	Lady Dynamite	Herself / Millicent Pratt / Jennipher Nickels / Ranlith the Hive Queen	2 episodes
2018	Condor	Marty Ross	Recurring role
2018	No One Would Tell	Judge Elizabeth Hanover	TV movie
2018	StartUp	Rebecca Stroud	Recurring role
2018	Modern Family	Nicole Rosemary Page	Recurring role
2018	Spy Kids: Mission Critical	Ingrid Cortez (voice)	Recurring role
2020	Hollywood	Jeanne Crandall	Miniseries
2021	Impeachment: American Crime Story	Marcia Lewis	Recurring role
2022–2023	Shining Vale	Rosemary Wellingham / Ruth Levin / Nellie Bly	Main role
2023	Dancing with the Stars	Herself / Contestant	Season 32
2023-2026	Celebrity Jeopardy!	Herself / Contestant	4 episodes
2024	Blue Bloods	Fire Commissioner	"Bad to Worse"
2026	Jeopardy!	Herself	Clue Giver

=== Theatre ===
Year	Title	Role	Theatre
2025	Chicago	Roxie Hart	Ambassador Theatre, Broadway.

== Works and publications ==
- Sorvino, Mira (1989). Anti-Africanism in China: An Investigation into Chinese Attitudes Towards Black Students in the PRC (Thesis/dissertation). Cambridge, MA: Harvard University. OCLC 36014182.
- Sorvino, Mira (October 9, 2012). "In the Pursuit of Justice". HuffPost.
- Sorvino, Mira (October 11, 2017). "Mira Sorvino: Why I Spoke Out Against Harvey Weinstein". Time.
