= Trade of Innocents =

2012 film

- Directed by: Christopher Bessette
- Written by: Christopher Bessette
- Produced by: Bill Bolthouse; Laurie Bolthouse; Jim Schmidt
- Starring: Dermot Mulroney; Mira Sorvino; John Billingsley; Trieu Tran
- Edited by: Diane Brunjes Robb
- Music by: Timothy Hosman
- Production company: The Bicycle Peddler LLC
- Distributed by: Monterey Media (US)
- Release dates: June 2012 (Breckenridge Festival of Film); October 2012 (Quad Cinema)
- Running time: 91 minutes
- Country: United States
- Language: English

Trade of Innocents is a 2012 American made thriller independent film written and directed by Christopher Bessette and starring Dermot Mulroney, Mira Sorvino, John Billingsley and Trieu Tran.

The film was shot on location in Bangkok, Thailand. It will look to bring awareness and involvement to work against human trafficking.

== Plot ==
In the back streets of a tourist town in present-day Cambodia, we find a filthy cinder block room; a bed with soiled sheets; a little girl waits for the next man to use her. Alex, a human trafficking investigator plays the role of her next customer as he negotiates with the pimp for the use of the child. Claire, Alex's wife, is caught up in the flow of her new life in Southeast Asia and her role as a volunteer in an aftercare shelter for rescued girls. She, and Alex both still are dealing with their grief of losing a child years earlier. As both of them struggle in their own way to overcome the pain of their past and realities of child exploitation where they now live and work, they find themselves being pulled together into the lives of local neighborhood girls, whose freedom and dignity are threatened.

== Cast ==
- Dermot Mulroney as Alex Becker
- Mira Sorvino as Claire Becker
- John Billingsley as Malcolm Eddery
- Trieu Tran as Duke
- Rena Yamada as little girl in the start

== Production ==
=== Development ===
The inspiration of Trade of Innocents came from a combination of the experience of the director (Christopher Bessette) and his trip to Phnom Penh, and the producers Bill and Laurie Bolthouse experience on their trip Phnom Penh. Christopher Bessette and Bill and Laurie later came together to make the film.

Mira Sorvino has a longtime interest in supporting the cause of ending human trafficking. When asked about being in Trade of Innocents she said that "I felt it could be a powerful combination of my activist efforts and my artistic ventures."

== Release ==
In January 2011, Monterey Media acquired the United States and Canada distribution rights for the film from Bicycle Peddler LLC.

=== Festivals ===
Trade of Innocents was selected to screen at the following film festivals:

- 2012 Breckenridge Festival of Film
- 2012 Toronto Cornerstone Film Festival

=== Theatrical release ===
The film will begin its theatrical released in on October 5 at the Quad Cinema in New York.

=== Critical reception ===
The film received a positive reaction from Entertainment Tonight calling it a "powerful and important new film". Media Mike's also called the film "a rare gem that will probably not be seen by many but it really deserves mainstream shot." On Rotten Tomatoes, the film has a score of 0% based on 7 critic reviews. On Metacritic, the film has an average weighted score of 29 out of 100 based on 6 critic reviews, indicating "Generally Unfavorable Reviews."

== Awards ==
Festival	Category	Won
Toronto Cornerstone International Film Festival	Best Picture	Yes
International Christian Visual Media	Best Picture	Yes
Breckenridge Festival of Film	Best Drama	Yes
Breckenridge Festival of Film	Audience Award - 2nd Place	Yes
Breckenridge Festival of Film	Best Best Director	Yes
