= Beneath the Leaves =

2019 thriller film directed by Adam Marino

- Film poster
- Directed by: Adam Marino
- Screenplay by: Naman Barsoom; Daniel Wallner
- Story by: Adam Marino
- Produced by: Ivett Havasi; Tommy Kijas; Beau Turpin
- Starring: Mira Sorvino; Kristoffer Polaha; Doug Jones; Paul Sorvino; Ser'Darius Blain
- Cinematography: Chaz Olivier
- Edited by: Eric Strand
- Music by: Attila Fodor
- Production company: Reel Fire Entertainment
- Distributed by: Netflix
- Release date: February 8, 2019 (Netflix)
- Running time: 90 minutes
- Country: United States
- Language: English

Beneath the Leaves is a 2019 American thriller film co-written and directed by Adam Marino. The film was released on February 8, 2019, on Netflix.

== Plot ==
Detective Brian Larson must recapture James Whitley, a psychopath who victimized him and three other boys as children, when Whitley escapes from prison.

== Cast ==
- Mira Sorvino as Detective Erica Shotwell
- Kristoffer Polaha as Detective Brian Larson
- Doug Jones as James Whitley
- Aaron Farb as Detective Abrams
- Ser'Darius Blain as Josh Ridley
- Paul Sorvino as Captain Parker
- Christopher Backus as Matt Tresner
- Yvonne Miranda as Reporter Hawkins

== Release ==
On review aggregator Rotten Tomatoes, Beneath the Leaves has an approval rating of 20% based on five reviews, with an average rating of 4.9/10. Michael Rechtshaffen from the Los Angeles Times disliked the movie, stating: "A committed cast fails to elevate "Beneath the Leaves," an otherwise draggy and derivative thriller about a psychotic killer whose M.O. involves fatally injecting his victims with potassium chloride before harvesting their fingernails." John DeFore writing for The Hollywood Reporter said: "A by-the-book script and stiff direction fail to milk any suspense from this scenario and, in the absence of thrills, the picture's heavy focus on the long-lasting impact of trauma is suffocating. Sorvino and Polaha have no chemistry in their scenes away from the action, and some viewers who have admired the actress' vocal contributions to current harassment/assault debates will cringe at a scene where the lines "You want me to go?" and "Yes" are treated as an invitation to sex. Jones, most often seen under creature makeup, brings a few physical flourishes to his cookie-cutter psycho role, but not nearly enough to make it memorable." Roger Moore from the "Movie Nation" gave the film 1.5 out of 4 stars and wrote that it "keeps us at arm's length and the cast at half-speed, a disappointing combination when your aim was an intricate, raw-nerves thriller with visceral violence, surprises, and characters we connect with enough to root for."
