= Human Trafficking (miniseries) =

2005 television miniseries directed by Christian Duguay

- Original release U.S. DVD cover art
- Genre: Crime drama
- Written by: Carol Doyle; Agatha Dominik
- Directed by: Christian Duguay
- Starring: Mira Sorvino; Donald Sutherland; Robert Carlyle; Remy Girard
- Theme music composer: Normand Corbiel
- Country of origin: Canada
- Original language: English

Production
- Editors: Gaetan Huot; Sylvain Lebel
- Running time: 176 minutes

Original release
- Network: Lifetime Television
- Release: October 24 – October 25, 2005

Human Trafficking is a television miniseries about an American Immigration and Customs Enforcement agent going undercover to stop an organization from trafficking people, and shows the struggles of three trafficked women. It premiered in the United States on Lifetime Television on October 24 and 25, 2005, and was broadcast in Canada on Citytv on January 2 and 3, 2006. It stars Mira Sorvino, Donald Sutherland, Rémy Girard, and Robert Carlyle.

== Plot ==
In Prague, Czech Republic, single mother Helena (Isabelle Blais) is seduced by a successful, handsome man and travels with him to spend a weekend in Vienna, Austria. He then sells her to a human trafficking ring and she is brought to New York City to work as a sex slave. In Kyiv, Ukraine, sixteen-year-old Nadia (Laurence Leboeuf) enters a modelling competition, without her father's knowledge. She is selected by the bogus model agency to travel to New York with the other selected candidates, where she is forced into a life of sexual slavery. Nadia and Helena are placed in the same house in Washington and become friends.

In Manila, Philippines, twelve-year-old American tourist Annie Gray (Sarah-Jeanne Labrosse) is abducted in front of her mother in a busy street by sex traffickers. She is forced into a child brothel which primarily services sex tourists, overseen by an Australian man, Tommy.

In common, the girls become victims of a powerful international network of sex traffickers led by the powerful Sergei Karpovich (Robert Carlyle).

In New York, after the third death of young Eastern European prostitutes, Russian-American NYPD Detective Kate Morozov (Mira Sorvino) suspects that these women are being "trafficked" by human trafficking gangs. Kate becomes a Special Agent with U.S. Immigration and Customs Enforcement under her new boss, Bill Meehan (Donald Sutherland), the Special Agent-In-Charge of U.S. Immigration and Customs Enforcement's New York Field Office.

At a party worked by Sergei's girls, Nadia attempts escape but is caught. As punishment, Helena is moved to a location in New York City.

Kate busts a salon where girls are being trafficked from the basement. One of the rescued girls is Helena. She tells Kate about her daughter in Prague, who is successfully rescued by Czech police before Karpovich's men can abduct her. Helena also mentions Sergei Karpovich and implores Kate to find Nadia. However, Helena is killed by a sniper bullet shortly after being moved to protective custody.

In Manila, Annie's mother remains to search for her daughter while her husband returns to the US. Meanwhile, Annie is held at a child brothel, awaiting transportation to the Middle East. She manages to call her mother and they overhear Tommy talking in the background. They later identify Tommy on the street and the brothel is identified by the police.

In Kyiv, Nadia's father Viktor stresses about Nadia's disappearance. He locates details of the modelling agency and infiltrates the organisation by bonding with one of Karpovich's men. He is sent to Mexico City to help transport another shipment of girls. He is eventually sent to Washington, where he and Nadia are secretly reunited.

Using information from Helena, Kate locates the Washington brothel. While Nadia is away, ICE raid the brothel. Kate chases Viktor but when he mentions he is trying to rescue his daughter, she lets him escape. Nadia and Viktor are reunited in New York City.

Karpovich gives the name of the Manila brothel to his doctor. ICE raid the brothel and Dr Smith is arrested. However, Tommy is warned by a local police officer on the take and Annie and the other children are smuggled out just in time. The doctor gives the authorities Karpovich's name. Meanwhile, Annie and the other children are locked in a shipping container, awaiting their transportation. Due to missing paperwork and Tommy's execution, the container is abandoned on the docks.

Having no luck finding any new leads, Kate poses as a client on Karpovich's dating website and catches the attention of one of Karpovich's men. She pretends to travel from Moscow and is taken to the New York brothel. With Kate inside, ICE raid the building once Karpovich arrives. Karpovich is killed, along with several of his men. Nadia and Viktor are rescued.

In Manila, another of Annie's captors has a change of heart upon watching his daughter play. He calls the police and alerts them about the shipping container. Annie is rescued, along with the other children, and reunited with her parents. Karpovich's empire is dismantled, many other girls are rescued and his associates arrested.

Human Trafficking closes with images of people walking through crowded city streets, as a closing title caption announces that human trafficking is the third-most profitable criminal business in the world, with as many as 800,000 victims each year.

== Cast ==
- Mira Sorvino – Agent Kate Morozov / Katya Morozova
- Donald Sutherland – Agent Bill Meehan
- Robert Carlyle – Sergei Karpovich
- Rémy Girard – Viktor Taganov
- Isabelle Blais – Helena Votrubova
- Laurence Leboeuf – Nadya Taganova
- Vlasta Vrána – Tommy
- Céline Bonnier – Sophie
- Mark Antony Krupa – Andrej
- Lynne Adams – Ellen Baker
- David Boutin – Frederick
- Emma Campbell – Samantha Gray
- Sarah-Jeanne Labrosse – Annie Gray
- Michael Sorvino – Misha Morozov
- Morgane Slemp - Susan
- Anna Hopkins – Katerina
- Dawn Ford – Viktoria Votrubova

== Production ==
The miniseries was produced by Muse Entertainment Enterprises for broadcast on Lifetime Television. In April 2005 Muse announced that principal photography had begun and that a Canadian broadcaster would be announced shortly. The miniseries was filmed in Montreal, Bangkok, and Prague and was completed in July 2005.

== Reception ==
Human Trafficking received generally mixed to positive reviews by critics. Alessandra Stanley of the New York Times noted that Human Trafficking "avoids the seedy sensationalism that cheapens so many television depictions of the crime" and that it is "a harsh public-service message built into a clever, suspenseful thriller."

Tom Shales of The Washington Post was more negative as he found the miniseries an odd subject for Lifetime to broadcast. He noted that in attempting to, "expose a worldwide scandal" Human Trafficking, "happens to expose vast amounts of flesh in the process—exploitation about exploitation."

John Doyle of The Globe and Mail was also negative towards the miniseries. He compared it to the "searing, shocking and hard to watch" CBC/Channel 4 miniseries Sex Traffic which "suggested a direct connection between the sex trade and NATO officials, and with Western corporations based in Eastern Europe. Doyle concluded that "While Human Trafficking is an international co-production with an international cast, it feels obstinately constructed to satisfy small-minded American viewers.

== Awards and nominations ==
Year	Award	Category	Nominee(s)	Result	Ref.
2005	Online Film & Television Association Awards	Best Miniseries		Nominated	
2006	Directors Guild of Canada Awards	Outstanding Television Movie/Mini-Series		Won	
2006	Directors Guild of Canada Awards	Outstanding Direction – Television Movie/Mini-Series	Christian Duguay	Won	
2006	Directors Guild of Canada Awards	Outstanding Production Design – Television Movie/Mini-Series	Guy Lalande	Won	
2006	Gemini Awards	Best Dramatic Mini-Series	Michael Prupas, Christian Duguay, and Irene Litinsky	Won	
2006	Gemini Awards	Best Actress in a Featured Supporting Role in a Dramatic Program or Mini-Series	Isabelle Blais	Nominated	
2006	Gemini Awards	Best Costume Design	Mariane Carter	Won	
2006	Gemini Awards	Best Production Design or Art Direction in a Dramatic Program or Series	Guy Lalande	Won	
2006	Gemini Awards	Best Sound in a Dramatic Program	Louis Gignac, Michel B. Bordeleau, Natalie Fleurant, and Hans Peter Strobl	Nominated	
2006	Gold Derby Awards	Best Miniseries		Nominated	
2006	Gold Derby Awards	TV Movie/Mini Lead Actor	Donald Sutherland	Nominated	
2006	Gold Derby Awards	TV Movie/Mini Lead Actress	Mira Sorvino	Nominated	
2006	Gold Derby Awards	TV Movie/Mini Supporting Actor	Robert Carlyle	Nominated	
2006	Golden Globe Awards	Best Actor in a Miniseries or Motion Picture Made for Television	Donald Sutherland	Nominated	
2006	Golden Globe Awards	Best Actress in a Miniseries or Motion Picture Made for Television	Mira Sorvino	Nominated	
2006	Primetime Emmy Awards	Outstanding Lead Actor in a Miniseries or a Movie	Donald Sutherland	Nominated	
2006	Primetime Emmy Awards	Outstanding Supporting Actor in a Miniseries or a Movie	Robert Carlyle	Nominated	
2006	Primetime Emmy Awards	Outstanding Music Composition for a Miniseries, Movie or a Special (Original Dramatic Score)	Normand Corbeil	Nominated	
2006	Women's Image Network Awards	Outstanding Lead Actor in a Miniseries or a Movie	Robert Carlyle	Won	

== DVD ==
On October 25, 2005, Maple Pictures released a 2 disc DVD set of the mini-series in Canada, which contained interviews with the director and the five principal cast members on the second disc. Echo Bridge Home Entertainment released the miniseries on a single DVD in the U.S. on May 2, 2006, with deleted scenes not shown during the airing on Lifetime, interactive resources, and scene selections. The Canadian DVD is rated 14A; the U.S. release is labeled Not Rated by the MPAA due to enhanced violence of the deleted scenes.

== See also ==
- Skin Trade (film)
