= Melora Walters =

American actress (born 1959)

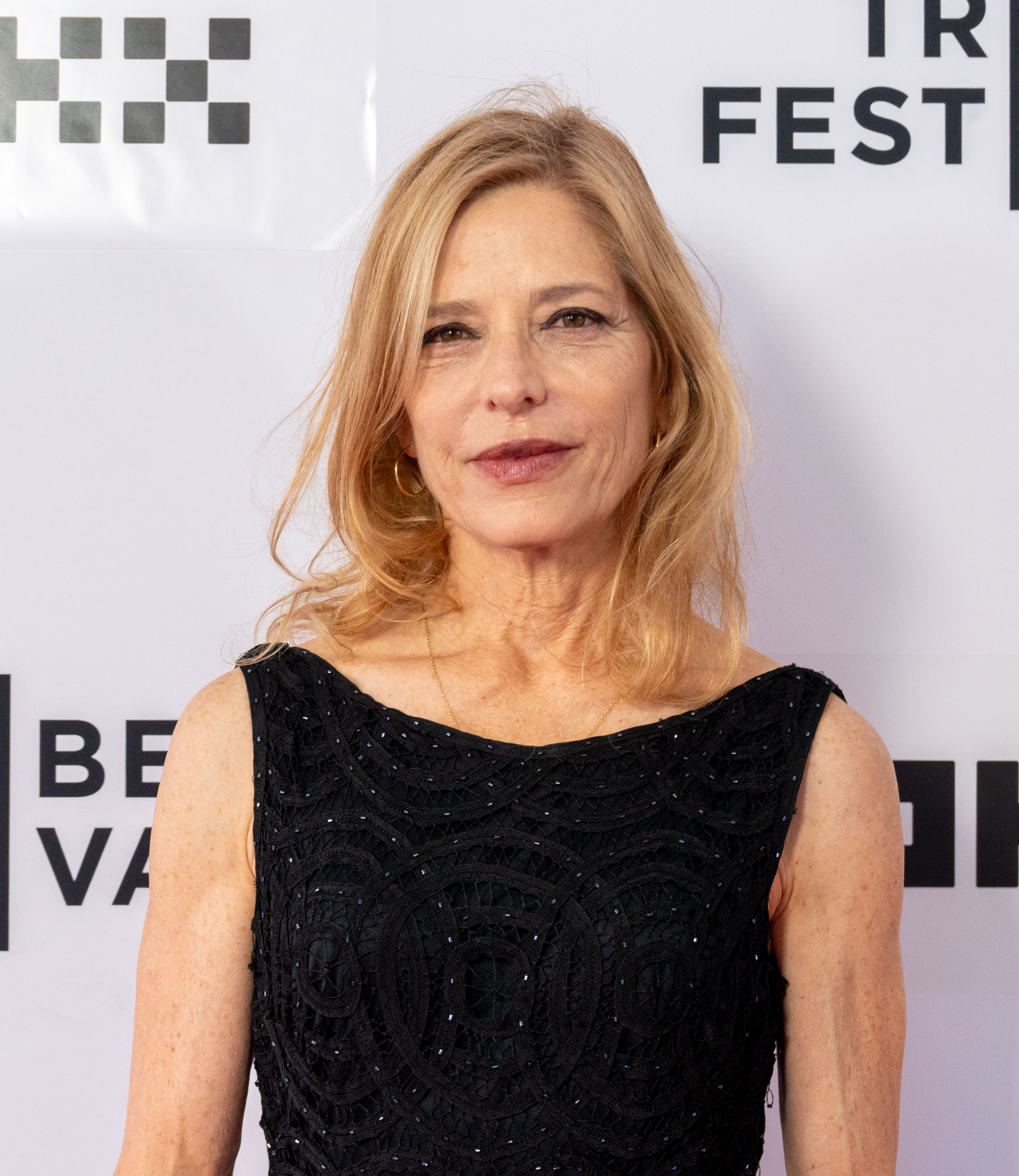
- Walters in 2026
- Born: October 21, 1959 (age 67); Dhahran, Eastern Province, Saudi Arabia
- Occupations: Actress; filmmaker
- Years active: 1988–present
- Spouses: Christopher Scotellaro (m. 1990; div. 1994); Dylan Walsh (m. 1996; div. 2003); Alex Vendler (m. 2008; div. 2010)
- Children: 2

Melora Walters (born October 21, 1959) is an American actress and filmmaker, best known for her starring roles as Wanda Henrickson on HBO's Big Love (2006–2010) and Kathy Kone on Hulu's Pen15 (2019–2021). She has frequently collaborated with Paul Thomas Anderson, earning two Screen Actors Guild nominations for her work in Boogie Nights (1997) and Magnolia (1999), respectively. Her other film credits include Dead Poets Society (1989), Eraser (1996), Matchstick Men, Cold Mountain (both 2003), The Butterfly Effect (2004), Short Term 12 (2013), Cam, Venom (both 2018), and Offseason (2021). Walters's directorial credits include Waterlily Jaguar (2018) and Drowning (2019), both of which she wrote and co-produced.

== Career ==
=== Film ===
Walters made her screen debut with a small part in the 1988 film Underground, which she followed with the more substantial role of Gloria, a school student, in Peter Weir's critically acclaimed Dead Poets Society (1989). Following roles in various features throughout the early-mid 1990s, such as Beethoven (1992), Tim Burton's Ed Wood (1994), and the commercially successful Eraser (1996), Walters began a professional partnership with Paul Thomas Anderson when she appeared in his directorial debut, the 1996 crime drama Hard Eight. She earned praise for her work in his subsequent films Boogie Nights (1997) and Magnolia (1999), with Variety critic Emanuel Levy describing her portrayal of drug addict Claudia in the latter as "superlative". For her performance in Doubting Thomas (2018), Walters was named Best Supporting Actress at the Golden Door Film Festival.

=== Television ===
On television, Walters has appeared in guest roles on series such as Roseanne, Nash Bridges, Seinfeld, NYPD Blue, CSI, Desperate Housewives, Californication, The Mentalist, NCIS, Law & Order: Special Victims Unit, and American Gigolo. She also starred as Felicity on L.A. Doctors (1998–1999), Wanda Henrickson on Big Love (2006–2010), and Kathy Kone on Pen15 (2019–2021). She also played a waitress in The Wonder Years episode "Road Trip" (1991).

== Personal life ==
Walters has two children from her marriage to Dylan Walsh; they divorced in 2003. She was previously married to actor Christopher Scotellaro between 1990 and 1994. Walters married cinematographer Alex Vendler on June 21, 2008. She filed for divorce from Vendler in 2010, citing irreconcilable differences.

== Filmography ==
=== Film ===
Year	Title	Role	Notes
1988	Underground	Prostitute	
1988	Staring at the Dark	Eden	Short
1989	Dead Poets Society	Gloria	
1989	Rude Awakening	"Punky"	Uncredited
1992	Beethoven	Pet Shop Owner	
1993	America's Deadliest Home Video	Gloria	
1993	Twenty Bucks	The Stripper / Funeral Director	
1994	Cabin Boy	Trina	
1994	All Tied Up	Bliss	
1994	Ed Wood	Secretary #2	
1996	Hard Eight	Jimmy's Girl	
1996	Eraser	Darleen Casteleone	
1996	American Strays	Cindy	
1997	Los Locos	Allison	
1997	Boogie Nights	Jessie St. Vincent	Florida Film Critics Circle Award for Best Cast
1999	Magnolia	Claudia Wilson Gator	Florida Film Critics Circle Award for Best Cast
2001	Speaking of Sex	Melinda	
2001	Rain	Ellen	
2002	WiseGirls	Kate	
2002	Desert Saints	FBI Agent Bennie Harper	
2003	Melvin Goes to Dinner	Trenice, Melvin's Girlfriend	Copper Wing Award for Best Ensemble
2003	The Big Empty	Candy	
2003	Matchstick Men	Heather, Roy's Ex-Wife	Uncredited
2003	Cold Mountain	Lila	
2004	The Butterfly Effect	Andrea Treborn	
2007	Brothers Three: An American Gothic	Loren	
2008	Harrison Montgomery	Margo Fleming	
2008	Black Crescent Moon	Katelan Beacon	
2008	Dark Yellow	Woman	Short
2009	Hurt	Helen Coltrane	
2010	Case 219	Victoria Lash	
2010	Shit Year	Shelly	
2010	Love Ranch	Janelle	
2011	The River Murders	FBI Agent Glover	
2012	The Master	Band (voice)	
2012	Mary	Mary	Short
2012	Missing Pieces	Delia Greenly	
2013	Short Term 12	Dr. Hendler	
2013	Underdogs	Nancy Smith-Burkett	
2013	Lonely Boy	Betsy	
2013	They Shoot	Unknown	Short
2014	The Young Kieslowski	Barbara Kieslowski	
2014	Sacrifice	Enid	
2015	Sex, Death and Bowling	Evie	
2016	Indiscretion	Harper	
2016	The Muse	None	Short; writer and director
2016	Sugar Mountain	Tracy Huxley	
2017	Good After Bad	Victoria	
2017	The Lovers	Lucy	
2017	An American Dog Story	Efthemia (voice)	
2017	Odious	Beatrice	
2018	Not a Stranger	Jill Madden	
2018	In a Relationship	Mia Ziniti	
2018	Doubting Thomas	Kate	Golden Door Festival Award for Best Supporting Actress
2018	Waterlily Jaguar	None	Writer and director
2018	Cam	Lynne Ackerman	
2018	Venom	Maria, Homeless Woman	
2018	The Amaranth	Lily Kendrick	
2019	Beneath the Leaves	Rose	
2019	Robert the Bruce	Ylfa	
2019	Kleen	Judith	Short
2019	Stuck	Nancy	Short
2019	Drowning	Rose	Also writer, director, producer
2019	Adeline, the Great	Ms. Nichols	Short
2019	Where Are You	Edith, The Gatekeeper	
2020	The Pale Door	Maria	
2020	Pink Skies Ahead	Hayley	
2020	Hard Luck Love Song	Sally "Gypsy Sally"	
2021	Far More	Evie Flores	
2021	Offseason	Ava Aldrich	
2021	Severed Silence	Naida	
2021	Attention Attention	Ruby	
2021	West of Eden	Evelyn	Short
2022	The Hater	Sally Jensen	
2025	The Idea	Wife	Short
2025	Situations	Brianne	
2026	Crooks	Blanche	Post-production
TBA	They Follow †	TBA	Post-production

=== Television ===
Year	Title	Role	Notes
1989–1990	Roseanne	Debbie	Recurring (season 2); 5 episodes
1990	How to Murder a Millionaire	Ginger	Television film
1991	The Wonder Years	Waitress	Episode: "Road Trip"
1991	ABC Afterschool Specials	Unknown	Episode: "It's Only Rock & Roll"
1992	Murphy Brown	Lisa	Episode: "He-Ho, He-Ho, It's Off to Lamaze We Go"
1992	Dear John	Maria	Episode: "Adult Education"
1993	Telling Secrets	Karen Blake	Television film
1993	Walker, Texas Ranger	Star Buckley	Episode: "Bounty"
1993	Bakersfield P.D.	Marnie Archer	Episode: "Lucky 13"
1994	Dead Man's Revenge	Bunny	Television film
1994	Seinfeld	Jane	Episode: "The Hamptons"
1994	Midnight Run for Your Life	Lorna Bellstratten	Television film
1995	The Marshal	Sheryl	Episode: "The Ballad of Lucas Burke"
1995	Picket Fences	Sherri Watkins	Episode: "Reap the Whirlwind
1995	Dream On	Dina	Episode: "Little Orphan Eddie"
1995	NYPD Blue	Holly Snyder	Episodes: "The Bank Dick" and "Dirty Laundry"
1996	Simon	Emily	Episode: "Simon Night Fever"
1996	Nash Bridges	Florence "Flo"	Episode: "Skirt Chasers"
1997	High Incident	Unknown	Episode: "Camino High"
1997	Brooklyn South	Carly	Episode: "A Reverend Runs Through It"
1998–1999	L.A. Doctors	Felicity	Series regular (season 1); 20 episodes
1998	Twice Upon a Time	Alannah Merribone	Television film
2002	Push, Nevada	Grace	Main cast; 7 episodes
2003–2004	Threat Matrix	Lia "Lark" Larkin	Main cast; 13 episodes
2005	CSI: Crime Scene Investigation	Sage	Episode: "Gum Drops"
2006–2010	Big Love	Wanda Henrickson	Main cast (seasons 1–4); 35 episodes
2007	Desperate Housewives	Sylvia Greene	Episodes: "Distant Past", "Something's Coming"
2012	Californication	Lisa	Episode: "Raw"
2012	Franklin & Bash	Joan Ackermann	Episode: "Strange Brew"
2014	Rake	Jan Falcon	Episode: "Man's Best Friend"
2015	The Mentalist	Amber	Episode: "Byzantium"
2015	Criminal Minds	Paige	Episodes: "Protection" and "The Hunt"
2016	NCIS	Susan Elizabeth Lowe	Episode: "Reasonable Doubts"
2017	Law & Order: Special Victims Unit	Laurel	Episode: "Something Happened"
2018	Cherries	Patsy	Television film
2018	Corporate	Nadine	Episode: "Corporate Retreat"
2018	The Lover in the Attic: A True Story	None	Television film; director
2019	The OA	Melody	Episode: "Angel of Death"
2019–2021	Pen15	Kathy Kone	Main cast; 22 episodes
2022	American Gigolo	Maryanne Henderson	3 episodes

=== Music videos ===
Year	Title	Artist	Notes
1997	"Try"	Michael Penn	Directed by Paul Thomas Anderson
1999	"Save Me"	Aimee Mann	Directed by Paul Thomas Anderson
