= Tammy Blanchard =

American actress

- Born: Tammy Jean Blanchard; December 14, 1976 (age 49); Bayonne, New Jersey, U.S.
- Occupation: Actress
- Years active: 1996–present
- Children: 1

Tammy Jean Blanchard (born December 14, 1976) is an American actress. She rose to prominence for her role as teenage Judy Garland in the critically acclaimed television film Life with Judy Garland: Me and My Shadows (2001), for which she received a Golden Globe Award nomination and a Primetime Emmy Award. Her other notable film roles were in The Good Shepherd (2006), Sybil (2007), Into the Woods (2014) and The Invitation (2015).

Blanchard has been nominated for two Tony Awards: one for her role as Louise in the 2003 Broadway revival of the musical Gypsy, and the other as Hedy LaRue in the 2011 Broadway revival of the musical How to Succeed in Business Without Really Trying.

== Early years ==
Born on December 14, 1976, in Bayonne, New Jersey, Blanchard attended Mary J. Donohoe School and Bayonne High School.

== Career ==
She made her professional acting debut on the soap opera Guiding Light in 1997, where she played spoiled rich girl Drew Jacobs. Her first scene was with Taye Diggs, who briefly played a record producer on the show. The character of Drew became more prominent over the years, and by the time of her departure in 2000, had become an audience favorite.

Soon after leaving GL, Blanchard was cast as the younger version of Judy Davis's Judy Garland in the 2001 ABC television docudrama Life with Judy Garland: Me and My Shadows. She received glowing reviews for her performance and earned an Emmy Award for Outstanding Supporting Actress in a Miniseries or a Movie.

She played Marianne Mulvaney in the Lifetime television film We Were the Mulvaneys (2002), and was noted for her "fragile strength" by The New York Times reviewer. In 2004, she played Sally Reid in the CBS made-for-television film When Angels Come to Town, with Peter Falk.

Blanchard earned a Tony Award nomination and a Theatre World Award for her work in her Broadway debut in the 2003 revival of the musical Gypsy, in which she played the title role opposite Bernadette Peters.

Blanchard's film roles include The Good Shepherd (2006), starring as the deaf lover of Matt Damon's character; Bella (2006), which took the top prize at the 2006 Toronto International Film Festival; and The Ramen Girl (2008) and Deadline (2009), both working with Brittany Murphy. She co-starred with Jessica Lange in the CBS television remake of the 1976 television film Sybil, in which she portrays a woman with dissociative identity disorder (DID). In 2008, she appeared in the multi-star cast of the television docudrama Living Proof as the first woman to have been treated with the breast cancer drug Herceptin.

In 2010, Blanchard played Amy Roberts, the widow of a murderer, in the made-for-television film Amish Grace, which first aired on the Lifetime Movie Network. The movie is based on the West Nickel Mines School shooting. The Huffington Post noted that "This is an amazing young actress and she deserves to get better and better roles." The Hollywood Reporter noted that Blanchard gives "a moving turn". The same year, she appeared in the film Rabbit Hole, alongside Nicole Kidman and Aaron Eckhart, as Kidman's sister.

Blanchard played the role of "office bombshell Hedy La Rue" in the Broadway revival of How to Succeed in Business Without Really Trying, which opened on March 27, 2011, and closed on May 20, 2012. For this role, Blanchard received her second Tony Award nomination for Best Featured Actress in a Musical.

Blanchard starred in the film Union Square, co-written and directed by the Sundance Film Festival's Grand Jury Award Winner, Nancy Savoca, which premiered at the Toronto International Film Festival in 2011, and was screened in New York City in July 2012. In 2014, Blanchard appeared as Florinda in director Rob Marshall's film, Into the Woods, an adaptation of the popular stage musical. In 2015, she portrayed Eden in Karyn Kusama's thriller film The Invitation, and in 2016, she appeared in the film Tallulah, which debuted on Netflix.

She appeared in the Broadway production of The Iceman Cometh as Cora, which started on March 23, 2018, and she played Audrey in the Off Broadway revival of Little Shop of Horrors, which opened at the Westside Theatre on October 17, 2019. For this performance, she received a Drama Desk Award nomination for Outstanding Actress in a Musical, and a Grammy Award nomination for Best Musical Theater Album.

== Personal life ==
Blanchard lives in her hometown of Bayonne, New Jersey. She has a daughter.

== Filmography ==
=== Film ===
| Year | Title | Role | Notes |
|---|---|---|---|
| 2002 | Stealing Harvard | Noreen Plummer | |
| 2006 | Bella | Nina | |
| 2006 | The Good Shepherd | Laura | |
| 2008 | The Ramen Girl | Gretchan | |
| 2008 | Cadillac Records | Isabelle Allen | |
| 2009 | Deadline | Rebecca | |
| 2010 | Rabbit Hole | Izzy | |
| 2011 | The Music Never Stopped | Tamara | |
| 2011 | Moneyball | Elizabeth Hatteberg | |
| 2011 | Union Square | Jenny | |
| 2011 | Certainty | Melissa | |
| 2013 | Burning Blue | Susan Stephensen | |
| 2013 | Blue Jasmine | Nora | |
| 2014 | La vida inesperada (The Unexpected Life) | Jojo | |
| 2014 | Into the Woods | Florinda | Satellite Award for Best Cast – Motion Picture |
| 2015 | The Inherited | Wendy Danver | |
| 2015 | The Invitation | Eden | Nominated—Fright Meter Award for Best Supporting Actress |
| 2016 | Tallulah | Carolyn | |
| 2018 | Fourplay | Anna | |
| 2018 | The Wrong Sun | Jessie | |
| 2018 | American Dreamer | Becca | |
| 2018 | Boarding School | Mrs. Sherman | |
| 2018 | Warning Shot | Audrey | |
| 2018 | Beyond the Night | Caroline Marrow | |
| 2019 | A Beautiful Day in the Neighborhood | Lorraine Vogel | |
| 2020 | The Mimic | The Young Woman | |
| 2020 | Rifkin's Festival | Doris | |
| 2021 | Defining Moments | Laurel | |
| 2025 | Pretty Thing | Amanda | |
| 2026 | Test | Joanne | |

=== Television ===
| Year | Title | Role | Notes |
|---|---|---|---|
| 1997–2002 | Guiding Light | Drew Jacobs | Main cast |
| 2001 | Life with Judy Garland: Me and My Shadows | Judy Garland | 2 episodes Primetime Emmy Award for Outstanding Supporting Actress in a Limited Series or Movie; Nominated—Golden Globe Award for Best Supporting Actress – Series, Miniseries or Television Film; Nominated—Satellite Award for Best Supporting Actress – Series, Miniseries or Television Film |
| 2001 | Law & Order: Special Victims Unit | Kelly D'Leah | Episode: "Consent" |
| 2002 | Law & Order: Criminal Intent | Sarah Eldon | Episode: "Tomorrow" |
| 2002 | We Were the Mulvaneys | Marianne Mulvaney | Television film |
| 2004 | When Angels Come to Town | Sally Reid | Television film |
| 2007 | Sybil | Sybil | Television film |
| 2008 | Living Proof | Nicole Wilson | Television film |
| 2009 | Empire State | Beth Cochrane | Television film |
| 2010 | Amish Grace | Amy Roberts | Television film |
| 2010 | Law & Order | Dana Silva | Episode: "Brazil" |
| 2010 | The Good Wife | Petra Long | Episode: "Taking Control" |
| 2012 | A Gifted Man | Louise Mitchell | Episode: "In Case of Heart Failure" |
| 2012 | The Big C | Giselle | 3 episodes |
| 2012 | Of Two Minds | Elizabeth "Baby" Davis | Television film |
| 2014 | Madam Secretary | Claire Ionesco | Episode: "Need to Know" |
| 2015 | Elementary | Violet de Merville | Episode: "The Illustrious Client" |
| 2016 | Bull | Adele Bensimon | Episode: "The Necklace" |
| 2017 | Billions | Melanie | 2 episodes |
| 2017 | Blue Bloods | Valerie Madigan | Episode: "No Retreat, No Surrender" |
| 2017 | Daytime Divas | Sheree Ainsley | 5 episodes |
| 2018 | The Wrong Son | Jessie | Television film |
| 2019–2020 | Dare Me | Lana Cassidy | Recurring role |
| 2024 | American Sports Story: Aaron Hernandez | Terri Hernandez | Main cast |

== Stage ==
| Year | Title | Role | Notes |
|---|---|---|---|
| 2003–04 | Gypsy: A Musical Fable | Louise/Gypsy | Broadway |
| 2011–12 | How to Succeed in Business Without Really Trying | Hedy LaRue | Broadway |
| 2015–16 | Dada Woof Papa Hot | Julia | Off-Broadway Lincoln Center |
| 2018 | The Iceman Cometh | Cora | Broadway |
| 2019–22 | Little Shop of Horrors | Audrey | Off-Broadway |

== Awards and nominations ==
| Year | Award | Category | Work | Result |
|---|---|---|---|---|
| 2001 | Primetime Emmy Award | Outstanding Supporting Actress in a Miniseries or a Movie | Life with Judy Garland: Me and My Shadows | Won |
| 2002 | American Film Institute Award | Actor of the Year – Female – TV Movie or Mini-Series | Life with Judy Garland: Me and My Shadows | Nominated |
| 2002 | Golden Satellite Awards | Best Supporting Actress – Series, Miniseries or Television Film | Life with Judy Garland: Me and My Shadows | Nominated |
| 2002 | Golden Globe Award | Best Supporting Actress – Series, Miniseries or Television Film | Life with Judy Garland: Me and My Shadows | Nominated |
| 2003 | Tony Award | Best Featured Actress in a Musical | Gypsy: A Musical Fable | Nominated |
| 2003 | Theatre World Award | —N/a | Gypsy: A Musical Fable | Won |
| 2011 | Tony Award | Best Featured Actress in a Musical | How to Succeed in Business Without Really Trying | Nominated |
| 2020 | Drama Desk Award | Outstanding Actress in a Musical | Little Shop of Horrors | Nominated |
| 2021 | Grammy Awards | Best Musical Theater Album | Little Shop of Horrors | Nominated |
