= List of LGBTQ-related films of 2003 =

This is a list of lesbian, gay, bisexual, transgender or queer-related films released in 2003. It contains theatrically released films that deal with important gay, lesbian, bisexual, transgender or queer characters or issues and may have same-sex romance or relationships as a plot device.

== Films ==
Title	Director	Country	Genre	Cast	Notes
Adored (Poco più un anno fia - Diario di un pornodivo)	Marco Filiberti	Italy	Drama	Marco Filiberti, Urbano Barberini	a.k.a. Little More Than a Year Ago, Adored: Diary of a Porn Star and Adored: Diary of a Porn Star
The Adventure of Iron Pussy	Apichatpong Weerasethakul, Michael Shaowanasai	Thailand	Musical, comedy, drama	Michael Shaowanasai, Krissada Terrence, Siriyakorn Pukkavesh, Theerawat Thongjitti, Darunee Khrittabhunyalai, Krung Sriwilai and Jenjira Pongpis	
All Over Brazil	David Andrew Ward	United Kingdom	Short, drama	Frank Gallagher, Iain De Caestecker, Gemma Morrison, Ross Brackenridge, Cheryl-Anne Duncan, Pamela Dwyer, Christopher Gorman, James Kirk and Pete Mackenzie	10 minutes long, part of the 'Tartan Shorts' series for the BBC
April's Shower	Trish Doolan	United States	Comedy	Trish Doolan, Maria Cina, Joe Tabb, Denise Miller, Zack Ward, Samantha Lemole, Molly Cheek, Victoria Reiniger, Euan Macdonald, Lara Harris, Delaina Mitchell, Jane Booke, Randall Batinkoffl, Frank Grillo, Honey Labrador, Arly Jover, Gizelle D'Cole, Pamela Salem, Precious Chong, Jeffrey Gorman, Raymond O'Connor, Steve Portigiani and John Hardison	
Arisan!	Nia Dinata	Indonesia	Comedy, drama	Cut Mini Theo, Surya Saputra, Tora Sudiro, Aida Nurmala, Rachel Maryam Sayidina, Lili Harahap, Aurora Yahya, Wilza Lubis, Nico Siahaan, Tika Panggabean, Jajang C. Noer, Ria Irawan and Indra Birowo	
Beautiful Boxer	Ekachai Uekrongtham	Thailand	Drama	Asanee Suwan, Sorapong Chatree, Orn-Anong Panyawong, Nukkid Boonthong, Sitiporn Niyom, Kyoko Inoue, Sarawuth Tangchit and Keagan Kang	Biography of transsexual boxer Nong Thoom
Bright Young Things	Stephen Fry	United Kingdom	Drama	Emily Mortimer, Stephen Campbell Moore, Fenella Woolgar, Michael Sheen and James McAvoy	Based on the novel Vile Bodies by Evelyn Waugh
Brother Outsider: The Life of Bayard Rustin	Nancy Kates	United States	Documentary	Bayard Rustin	
Bulgarian Lovers	Eloy de la Iglesia	Spain	Comedy, drama	Fernando Guillén Cuervo, Dritan Biba, Pepón Nieto, Roger Pera and Anita Sinkovic	a.k.a. Los novios búlgaros
Camp	Todd Graff	United States	Comedy, drama	Daniel Letterle, Joanna Chilcoat, Robin de Jesús, Anna Kendrick, Alana Allen, Vince Rimoldi, Don Dixon, Tiffany Taylor, Sasha Allen, Eddie Clark, Leslie Frye, David Perlow, DeQuina Moore, Steven Cutts and Stephen Sondheim	
Carandiru	Héctor Babenco	Argentina; Brazil	Drama	Luiz Carlos Vasconcelos, Rodrigo Santoro, Milton Gonçalves, Lázaro Ramos, Caio Blat, Milhem Cortaz, Wagner Moura, Floriano Peixoto, Rita Cadillac, Gero Camilo, Ivan de Almeida, Ailton Graça, Maria Luisa Mendonça, Aida Leiner, Júlia Ianina, Sabrina Greve and Nelson Machado	Based on the book Estação Carandiru (Carandiru Station) by Drauzio Varella
Cheerleader Queens	Poj Arnon	Thailand	Comedy	Wongthep Khunarattanrat, Watcharachai Sataphitak	About a gay-transgender cheerleading team
Chouchou	Merzak Allouache	France	Comedy	Gad Elmaleh, Alain Chabat, Claude Brasseur, Julien Courbey, Catherine Frot, Catherine Hosmalin, Micheline Presle, Jacques Sereys, Roschdy Zem, Arié Elmaleh, Yacine Mesbah, Jean-Paul Comart and Anne Marivin	
Cowboys & Angels	David Gleeson	Germany; Ireland; United Kingdom	Comedy, drama	Michael Legge, Allen Leech, Sean Power, Amy Shiels, David Murray and Frank Kelly	
D.E.B.S.	Angela Robinson	United States	Short, comedy	Alexandra Breckenridge, Tammy Lynn Michaels, Shanti Lowry, Jill Ritchie, Clare Kramer, Daryl Theirse and James Buckhammer II	11 minutes long, a feature-length film was made in 2004
Dangerous Living: Coming Out in the Developing World	John Scagliotti	United States	Documentary		Explores the lives of gay, lesbian and transgender people in developing countries
Die, Mommie, Die!	Mark Rucker	United States	Comedy	Charles Busch, Jason Priestley, Frances Conroy, Philip Baker Hall, Stark Sands, Natasha Lyonne, Victor Raider-Wexler, Nora Dunn and Stanley DeSantis	Screenplay by Busch; based on his play of the same name
Doubt	Crisaldo Pablo	Philippines	Drama	Andoy Ranay, Paulo Gabriel, Larry Burns, John Lapus, Jojo Nones and Rey Pumaloy	a.k.a. Duda
The Dreamers	Bernardo Bertolucci	France; Italy; United Kingdom	Drama	Eva Green, Michael Pitt, Louis Garrel, Anna Chancellor, Robin Renucci, Jean-Pierre Kalfon, Jean-Pierre Leaud, Florian Cadiou, Pierre Hancisse, Valentin Merlet, Lola Peploe and Ingy Fillion	Screenplay by Gilbert Adair, based on his novel The Holy Innocents
Elephant	Gus Van Sant	United States	Drama	Alex Frost, Eric Deulen, John Robinson, Timothy Bottoms, Matt Malloy, Elias McConnell, Nathan Tyson, Carrie Finklea, Kristen Hicks, Bennie Dixon, Alicia Miles, Brittany Mountain, Jordan Taylor and Nicole George	Based in part on the 1999 Columbine High School massacre
The Event	Thom Fitzgerald	Canada; United States	Drama	Joanna Adler (billed as Joanna P. Adler), Chris Barry, Walter Borden, Ray Brimicombe, Laura Cahoot, Brent Carver, Linda Carvery, Rejean Cournoyer (billed as Réjean Joseph Cournoyer), Lucy Decoutere, Richard Donat, Chase Duffy, Olympia Dukakis, Tim Dunn, Travis Ferris, Robert Fucito, Ian Gilmore, Glen Grant (billed as Glen Michael Grant), Steven Hillyer, Celeste Jankowski, Dick Latessa, Jane Leeves, Tim Marback, Gianna Marciante, Jaclyn Markowitz, Vicky McCarty, Don McKellar, Ruth Moore, Carla Morton, Ken Nagami, Marcia Olsen, Joan Orenstein, Doug Pettigrew, Sarah Polley, Parker Posey, Cynthia Preston, Walker Richards, Susan Sayle, Jamie Stevens, Darryl Tannahill and Chaz Thorne	
Facing Windows	Ferzan Özpetek	Italy; Portugal; Turkey; United Kingdom	Drama	Giovanna Mezzogiorno, Massimo Girotti, Raoul Bova, Filippo Nigro, Serra Yilmaz, Maria Grazia Bon, Massimo Poggio, Ivan Bacchi, Chiara Andreis, Veronica Bruni, Olimpia Carlisi, Ohame-Brancy Hibuzo (billed as Ohame Brancy Chibuzo), Carlo Daniele, Rosaria De Cicco and Lucianna De Falco	a.k.a. La finestra di fronte
Fake ID	Gil D. Reyes	United States	Comedy	Stuart Perelmuter, Brian Gligor, Nina Burns, Mark Fisher, Michael Cyril Creighton and Jason Decker	
Far Side of the Moon	Robert Lepage	Canada	Drama	Robert Lepage, Anne-Marie Cadieux	a.k.a. La Face cachée de la lune; based on LePage's play of the same name
Girls Will Be Girls	Richard Day	United States	Comedy	Jack Plotnick, Clinton Leupp, Jeffery Roberson, Ron Mathews, Eric Stonestreet, Hamilton von Watts, Dana Gould, Chad Lindsey and Sam Pancake	
Goldfish Memory	Elizabeth Gill	Ireland	Comedy, drama	Sean Campion, Fiona O'Shaughnessy, Fiona Glascott, Peter Gaynor, Keith McErlean, Stuart Graham, Lise Hearns, Jean Butler, Justine Mitchell, Aisling O'Neill, Demien McAdam, Tony Brown and Flora Montgomery	
Gone, But Not Forgotten	Michael D. Akers	United States	Drama	Matthew Montgomery, Aaron Orr, Ariadne Shaffer, Joel Bryant, Brenda Lasker, Bryna Weiss, Holden Roark, Jenny Kim, Daniel Lee, Mark Fellows, Joanne Bevelaqua, Glenn Blakeslee and Brooke Hamlin	
The Iron Ladies 2 (Satree lek 2)	Yongyoot Thongkongtoon	Thailand	Comedy	Sujira Arunpipat, Kokkorn Benjathikoon, Anucha Chatkaew, Surapun Chawpaknam, Shiriohana Hongsopon, Hathairat Jaroenchaichana, Giorgio Maiocchi, Peter Maiocchi, Chaichan Nimpulsawasdi, Jesdaporn Pholdee, Phomsit Sitthijamroenkhun, Sutthipong Sitthijamroenkhun, Sahaphap Tor and Aphichart Vongkavee	Sequel to The Iron Ladies
Killer Drag Queens on Dope	Lazar Saric	United States	Comedy	Eva Destruction, Omar Alexis, Clark Weaver, Macky Beltzkovsky, Mario Diaz, Don Edmonds, Don Lucas, Haji and Lawrence Hilton-Jacobs	
Kleine Freiheit	Yüksel Yavuz	Germany	Drama	Cagdas Bozkurt, Necmettin Çobanoglu, Leroy Delmar, Sunay Girisken, Nazmi Kirik, Suzana Rozkosny, Naci Özarslan, Thomas Ebermann, Oktay Çagla and Demir Gökgöl	a.k.a. A Little Bit of Freedom
Latter Days	C. Jay Cox	United States	Drama	Steve Sandvoss, Wes Ramsey, Rebekah Johnson, Jacqueline Bisset, Amber Benson, Joseph Gordon-Levitt, Rob McElhenney, Khary Payton, Dave Power, Erik Palladino, Mary Kay Place, Jim Ortlieb and Linda Pine	
Lovers' Kiss	Ataru Oikawa	Japan	Romance	Aya Hirayama, Hiroki Narimiya, Mikako Ichikawa, Aoi Miyazaki, Yuma Ishigaki, Shinnosuke Abe, Naomi Nishida and Chikako Aoyama	Based on a manga by Akimi Yoshida
Maestro	Josell Ramos	United States	Documentary	Francis Grasso, Frankie Knuckles, Larry Levan, David Mancuso, Nicky Siano	
Mambo Italiano	Émile Gaudreault	Canada	Comedy, drama	Luke Kirby, Claudia Ferri, Peter Miller, Paul Sorvino, Ginette Reno, Mary Walsh, Sophie Lorain, Tim Post, Tara Nicodemo, Pierrette Robitaille, Dino Tavarone, Mark Camacho, Michel Perron, Lou Vani and Diane Lavallée	Co-written by Steve Galluccio, based on his stage play of the same name
Monster	Patty Jenkins	United States; Germany	Crime, drama	Charlize Theron, Christina Ricci, Bruce Dern, Lee Tergesen, Annie Corley, Pruitt Taylor Vince, Marco St. John, Marc Macaulay, Scott Wilson, Kane Hodder and Brett Rice	
The Mudge Boy	Michael Burke	United States	Drama	Emile Hirsch, Tom Guiry, Richard Jenkins, Pablo Schreiber, Zachary Knighton, Ryan Donowho, Meredith Handerhan and Beckie King	Based on Burke's 1998 short film Fishbelly White
Normal	Jane Anderson	United States	Drama	Jessica Lange, Tom Wilkinson, Clancy Brown, Hayden Panettiere, Joe Sikora, Richard Bull, Mary Siebel, Randall Arney and Rondi Reed	
Party Monster	Fenton Bailey Randy Barbato	United States; Netherlands	Crime, drama	Macaulay Culkin, Brendan O'Malley, Seth Green, Dillon Woolley, Justin Hagan, Diana Scarwid, Dylan McDermott, Wilson Cruz, Wilmer Valderrama, Chloë Sevigny, Marilyn Manson, Mia Kirshner, Daniel Franzese, Natasha Lyonne, John Stamos and Armen Ra	
Proteus	John Greyson	Canada; South Africa	Drama	Rouxnet Brown, Shaun Smyth, Neil Sandilands, Kristen Thomson, Tessa Jubber, Terry Norton, Adrienne Pearce, Grant Swanby, Brett Goldin, A.J. van der Merwe, Deon Lotz, Jeroen Kranenburg, Andre Samuels, Johan Jacobs, Katrina Kaffer, Kwanda Malunga, Illias Moseko, Andre Lindveldt, Peter van Heerden, Jane Rademeyer, Andre Odendaal, Lola Dollimore, Robin Smith, Colin le Roux, Andre Rousseau and Edwin Angless	
Rise Above: The Tribe 8 Documentary	Tracy Flannigan	United States	Documentary	Tribe 8 Band Members:Lynn Breedlove- Lead Singer, Silas Flipper Howard- Guitar, Leslie Mah- Guitar, Tantrum- Bass Player, Slade- Drums, Mama T.- Bass Player and Jen Schwartz- Drums	Follows the on stage and off stage activities of the band
Saved by the Belles	Ziad Touma	Canada	Comedy, drama	Brian Charbonneau, Karen Simpson, Steven Turpin, Danny Gilmore, Lydia Lockett, Matt Williston, Ron Diamond, Marcelle Lapierre, Mado Lamotte, Dennis O'Brien, Varda Etienne, Terry Sigalas, Louise Bastien, Robert Horble, Driss Berki, Paul Pabello, Alessandro Mangiarotti, Bernadette Rusgal, Nohémie Renaud and John Thomas Fraser	a.k.a. Échappée belles
Sayew	Kongdej Jaturanrasamee, Kiat Songsanant	Thailand	Comedy	Pimpaporn Leenutapong, Nuntawat Arsirapojcharnakul, Anon Saisangcharn, Phintusuda Tunphairao and Jutarat Atthakorn	'Sayew' translates in the Thai language to Spasm or X-Rated Sex Story: Fact or Fiction
Son frère	Patrice Chéreau	France	Drama	Bruno Todeschini, Eric Caravaca, Nathalie Boutefeu, Sylvain Jacques, Maurice Garrel, Catherine Ferran, Antoinette Moya, Fred Ulysse and Robinson Stévenin	a.k.a. His Brother
Tarnation	Jonathan Caouette	United States	Documentary	An autobiographical documentary focusing on Jonathan Caouette's early life and adulthood	It won the Best Documentary Award from the National Society of Film Critics, nominated for the Spirit Awards, the Gotham Awards, as well as the L.A. and London International Film Festivals.
Testosterone	David Moreton	Argentina; United States	Comedy, drama	David Sutcliffe, Celina Font, Antonio Sabato Jr., Jennifer Coolidge, Leonardo Brzezicki, Sônia Braga (billed as Sonia Braga), Dario Dukah, Jennifer Elise Cox, Davenia McFadden, Ezequiel Abeijón, Martín Borisenko, Barbara Bunge, Gustavo Chapa, Daniel Di Biase, Gabriel Dottavio, Americo Ferrari, Harry Havilio, Wolfram Hecht, Carlos Kaspar, Miriam Manfredini, Carolina Marcovsky, Luis Mazzeo, Hector Pazos, Fabrizio Perez, Luis Sabatini, Alejandro Stulchlik, Claudio Torres, Marcos Woinsky, McCaleb Burnett, Julie Fay, Sergio Gravier and Marcelo Aguilar	
Thirteen	Catherine Hardwicke	United States	Drama	Nikki Reed, Evan Rachel Wood	
A Thousand Clouds of Peace	Julián Hernández	Mexico	Drama	Juan Carlos Ortuno, Juan Torres, Perla de la Rosa, Salvador Alvarez, Rosa-Maria Gomez, Mario Oliver, Clarisa Rendón, Salvador Hernandez, Pablo Molina, Martha Gomez, Manuel Grapain Zaquelarez, Miguel Loaiza, Llane Fragoso and Pilar Ruiz	a.k.a. Mil nubes de paz cercan el cielo, amor, jamás acabarás de ser amor, A Thousand Clouds of Peace Fence the Sky, Love; Your Being Love Will Never End and A Thousand Peace Clouds Encircle the Sky
Tiresia	Bertrand Bonello	France	Drama	Laurent Lucas, Clara Choveaux, Thiago Telès, Célia Catalifo, Lou Castel, Alex Descas, Fred Ulysse, Stella, Marcelo Novais Teles, Olivier Torres, Isabelle Ungaro, Abel Nataf and Pascal Tréguy	
Tokyo Godfathers	Satoshi Kon	Japan	Animation, comedy, adventure	Tōru Emori, Yoshiaki Umegaki, Aya Okamoto, Shōzō Iizuka, Seizō Katō, Hiroya Ishimaru, Ryūji Saikachi, Yūsaku Yara, Kyōko Terase, Mamiko Noto, and Satomi Kōrogi	Loosely based on the short story Three Godfathers by Peter B. Kyne
Twist	Jacob Tierney	Canada	Drama	Nick Stahl, Joshua Close, Gary Farmer, Michèle-Barbara Pelletier, Tygh Runyan, Stephen McHattie, Moti Yona, Brigid Tierney, Andre Noble, Maxwell McCabe-Lokos, Josh Holliday, Dave Graham and Mike Lobel	Modern re-telling of the novel Oliver Twist by Charles Dickens
Under the Tuscan Sun	Audrey Wells	United States; Italy	Comedy, drama	Diane Lane, Raoul Bova, Sandra Oh, Lindsay Duncan, Vincent Riotta, Mario Monicelli, Roberto Nobile, Anita Zagaria, Evelina Gori, Kate Walsh, Pawel Szajda, David Sutcliffe, Jeffrey Tambor, Giulia Steigerwalt, Valentine Pelka, Sasa Vulicevic, Massimo Sarchielli, Claudia Gerini, Laura Pestellini, Don McManus, Matt Salinger, Elden Henson, Jack Kehler, Kristoffer Ryan Winters, Nuccio Siano, Malva Guicheney and Dan Bucatinsky	Based on the memoir of the same name by Frances Mayes
