= Guillermo Díaz (actor) =

American actor (born 1971)

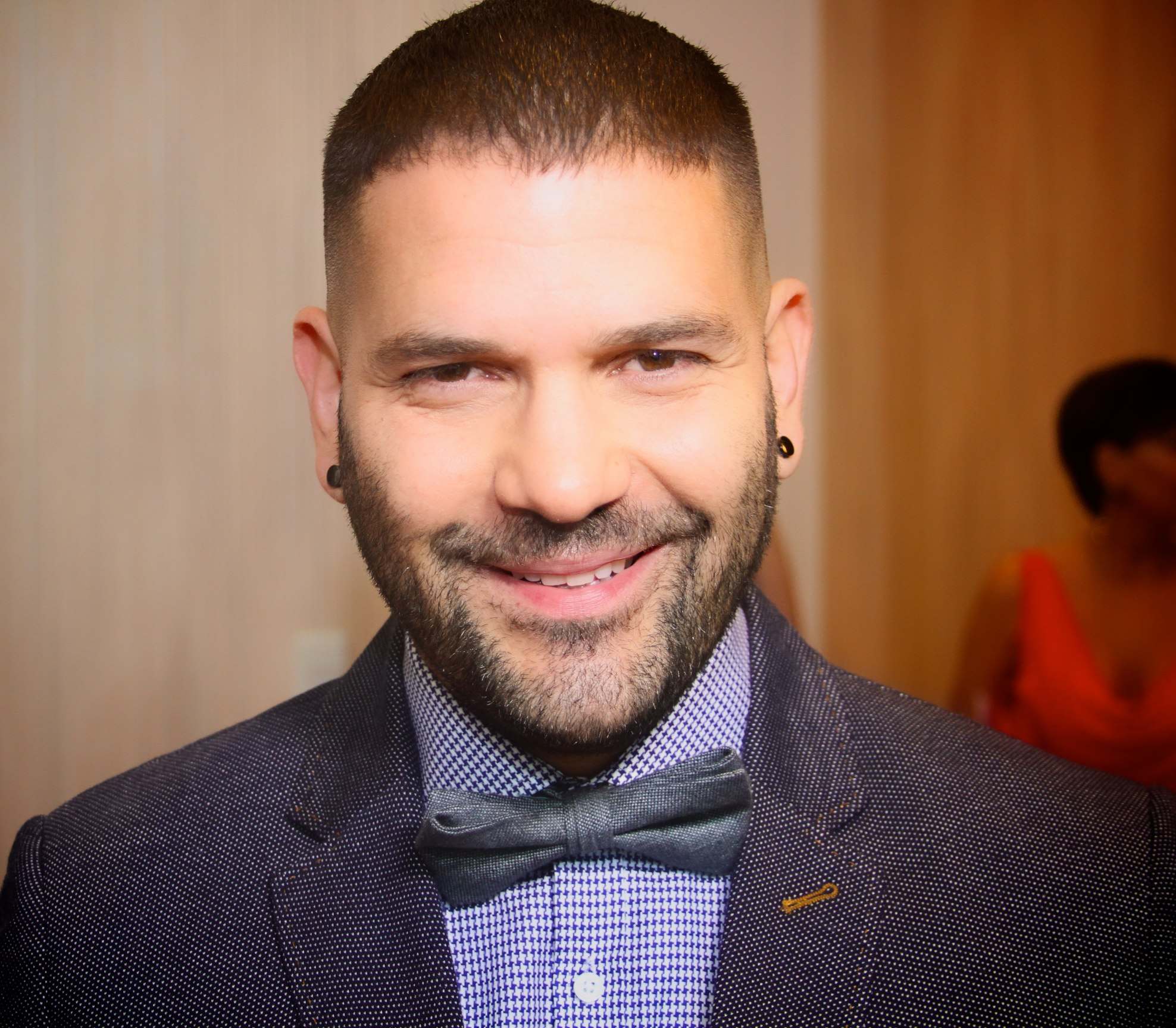
- Díaz in 2013
- Born: March 22, 1971 (age 55); New Jersey, U.S.
- Occupation: Actor
- Years active: 1994–present

Guillermo Díaz (born March 22, 1971) is an American actor. He is known for films Half Baked (1998), 200 Cigarettes (1999) and Stonewall (1995). He is best known as Diego "Huck" Muñoz in Scandal. Díaz has made guest appearances on Chappelle's Show, Law & Order, Weeds, ER, Broad City, and Girls.

== Early life and career ==
Díaz was born in New Jersey to Cuban parents, and grew up in Washington Heights, Manhattan. In 1994, he landed his first speaking role as Spike in Boaz Yakin's Fresh. From there he began working on Party Girl as Leo, Parker Posey's roommate. His next role was a drag queen (La Miranda) in Nigel Finch's Stonewall. In 1996, Díaz worked in Jim McKay's Girls Town as Dylan, after which he appeared in I'm Not Rappaport.

Díaz played Paco de la Vega al Camino Cordoba Jose Cuervo Sanchez Rodriguez Jr., a high school gang member in High School High. He later appeared in Freeway as Flaco, another gang member. While in Los Angeles, he did guest spots on ER and Party of Five.

After finishing work on the West Coast, Díaz traveled back east to play a stoner named Eric in Brian Sloan's film I Think I Do. A similar role followed as Scarface in the film Half Baked. One of his co-stars was Dave Chappelle, who later cast him in several episodes of Chappelle's Show. In 1999, he landed a non-verbal role in 200 Cigarettes, and went on to act in both Ethan Hawke's directorial debut Chelsea Walls and the movie Just One Time, where as secondary characters one critic thought that he and Jennifer Esposito provided what little "comic spark" existed in the film.

Díaz played Guillermo García Gómez, a drug dealer/trafficker, in seasons 2-6 of the series Weeds. In 2009, he starred on the series Mercy, where his portrayal of the gay nurse Angel received negative criticism in online forums for being too flamboyant. In 2010, he appeared in the thriller film Exquisite Corpse.

After having portrayed several Mexican gangsters (cholos), Díaz was cast in 2010 as a Latino gangster named Poh Boy in Cop Out. When asked about being typecast, he said: "I [used to worry], but not really anymore. Now I'm just grateful that I'm working. I try to make everything different."

In 2010, Díaz did a photoshoot for Pinups Magazine. The photoshoot featured full frontal nudity from Díaz.

In 2011, Díaz appeared alongside Britney Spears in a music video for the single "I Wanna Go", and took part in a scene referencing his character Scarface from Half Baked.

=== Scandal ===
In 2012, Díaz began his main role as Huck in the drama series Scandal.

Díaz was one of the many celebrities that acted in Beyoncé and Jay Z's video for "Run" in 2014.

== Personal life ==
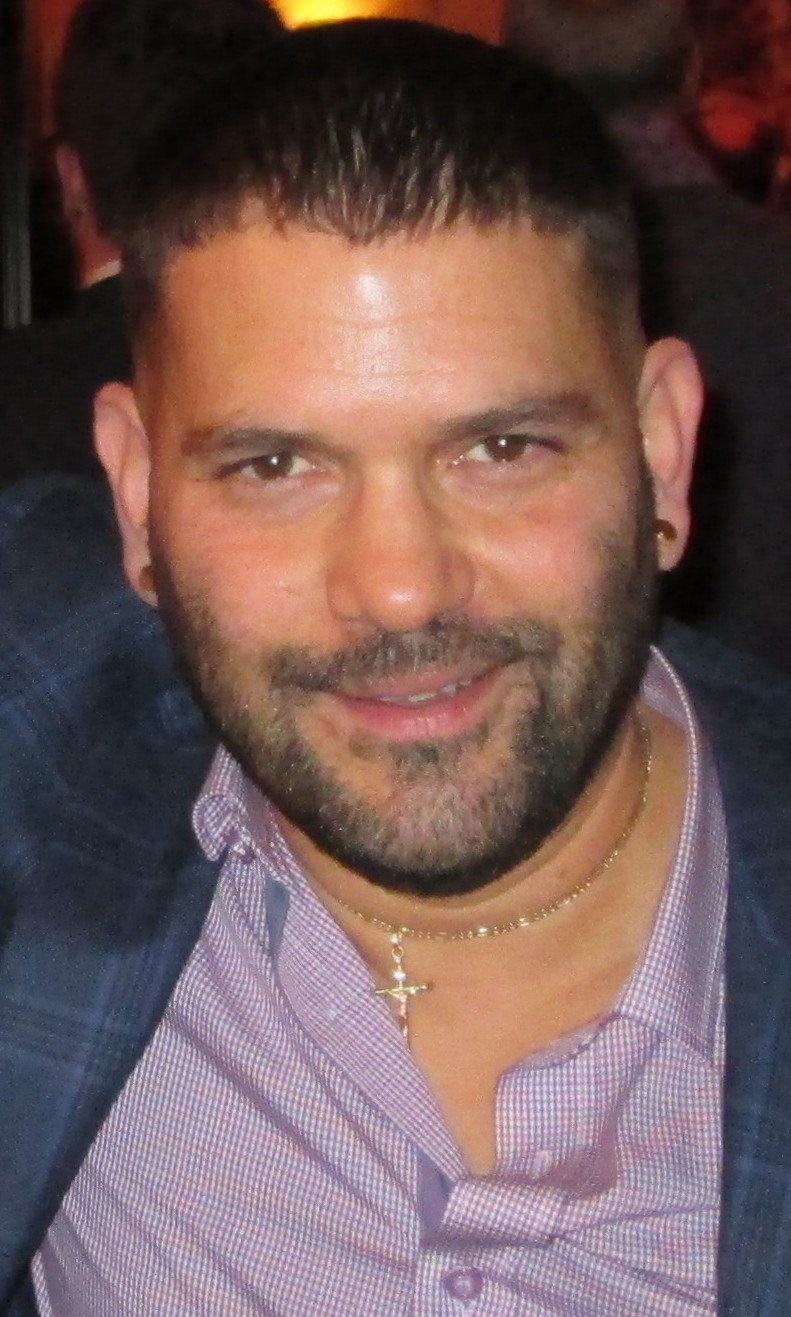
Díaz at the 2013 Outfest Legacy Awards

Díaz is gay. In 2011, he told Out magazine that his rough upbringing in New York City, during which he hid his sexuality so as not to become a target, ultimately made him a better actor. He said: "I went to school in the Bronx. I learned to constantly try to cover up the fact that I was gay. That façade of being somebody I'm really not just to protect myself definitely helped with acting." He was named one of Out Magazine's 100 most influential gay, lesbian, bisexual, or transgender people for 2013.

Díaz has said on multiple occasions that he is a fan of Madonna. He has been to all of her tours apart from The Virgin Tour and The Who's That Girl Tour. He also has her face tattooed on his right arm.

In November 2017, Díaz was nominated to Out magazine's "OUT100" for 2017 in recognition of his work and his visibility.

== In popular culture ==
In 2006, he joined the cast of a series of improv-based commercials for Sierra Mist titled Mist Takes. A Spanish version of the advertisements began airing, and the bilingual Díaz also starred in those with other Latino comedians.

== Filmography ==
=== Film ===
Year	Film	Role	Notes
1994	Fresh	Spike	
1995	Party Girl	Leo	
1995	Stonewall	La Miranda	
1996	Freeway	Flacco	
1996	Girls Town	Dylan	
1996	High School High	Paco de la Vega Camillo Cordová José-Quergo Sanchez Rodriguez Jr.	
1996	I'm Not Rappaport	J.C.	
1997	I Think I Do	Eric	
1997	Nowhere	Cowboy	
1998	The Effects of Magic	Winston	
1998	Half Baked	Scarface	
1998	Just One Time	Victor	Short film
1999	200 Cigarettes	Dave	
1999	In Too Deep	Miguel Batista	
1999	Just One Time	Victor	Remake of 1998 short film
1999	Pop Tarts	Adrian	Short film
2001	Chelsea Walls	Kid	
2002	A Log Story	Niko Gorgina	
2002	Sexy	Voice 3	Short film
2002	West of Here	Thomas	
2003	A Mi Amor Mi Dulce	Chocolate de la Oca Montez	Short film
2003	DoUlike2watch.com		
2003	Undermind	Ray	
2003	Wasabi Tuna	Romeo	
2004	The Terminal	Bobby Alima	
2004	Tony n' Tina's Wedding	Raphael	
2005	My Suicidal Sweetheart	Hector	
2005	Dirty Love	Tom Houdini, Magician	
2005	Husk	Chris	Short film; remade as Husk (2011)
2005	Sangre/Blood	Ricky	Short film
2005	Shooting Vegetarians	Nei	
2006	Down the P.C.H.	Doc	
2006	Harvest	Eugene Pitkin	Short film
2006	Seeking Solace	Guy	Short film
2006	The Utopian	Carlos Alvarez	Short film
2006	The Virgin of Juarez	Felix	
2007	No Destination	A.J.	Short film
2008	The Candy Shop	Halo	
2008	Evilution	Killah-B	
2009	Across the Hall	The Cook	
2009	The Butcher	Owen Geiger	
2009	No Exit	Michael	Short film
2010	Cop Out	Poh Boy	
2010	Exquisite Corpse	Henry	
2010	Peep World	Jesus	
2011	Without Men	Campo Elias	
2012	2nd Serve	Carlos	
2012	She Who Laughs Last	Clown	Short film
2012	Students Like Us	Adult Mike	
2013	Bilet na Vegas (Билет на Vegas)	Detective García	
2018	Warning Shot	Rainy	
2022	Bros	Edgar	
2027	Jason	Rick	Post-production

=== Television ===
Year	Title	Role	Notes
1994	Law & Order	Juan Domingo	Episode: "Kids"
1995	ER	Jorge	Episode: "Days Like This"
1995	Party of Five	Ari	Episode: "Analogies"
1997	Gold Coast	Barry	TV film
1999	Law & Order	Bobby Sabo	Episode: "Marathon"
1999	The Sopranos	Salesperson	Episode: "Meadowlands"
2000	Touched by an Angel	Rick Higuerra	Episode: "The Invitation"
2002	Fidel	Universo Sánchez	TV film
2002	Third Watch	Rafael "Rafe" Connors	Episode: "The Long Guns"
2003	Undefeated	Manny	TV film
2003–2006	Chappelle's Show	Himself	Guest; 5 episodes
2004	The Shield	Garza	Episode: "Blood and Water"
2004	Without a Trace	Carlos Gonzalez	Episode: "Life Rules"
2006	13 Graves	Manny Rodriguez	TV film
2007	Mist-Takes	Himself	Sierra Mist commercials
2007	Cane	Petey	3 episodes
2007	The Closer	Spider	Episode: "Four to Eight"
2007–2012	Weeds	Guillermo García Gómez	Guest; 26 episodes
2008	Criminal Minds	Playboy	Episode: "Brothers in Arms"
2009–2010	Mercy	Nurse Ángel García	Main role
2009	Poor Paul	Aaron	4 episodes
2009	Royal Pains	Benny	Episode: "Strategic Planning"
2010–2011	No Ordinary Family	Detective Frank Cordero	Guest; 6 episodes
2011	Harry's Law	Miguel Martínez	Episode: "The Fragile Beast"
2011	Love Bites	Luis	3 episodes
2011	Poor Paul	Aaron	4 episodes
2011	Tosh.0		Episode: "Brian Atene"
2012	Law & Order: Special Victims Unit	Omar Peña	Episode: "Justice Denied"
2012–2018	Scandal	Diego "Huck" Muñoz	Main role
2016	Girls	Hector Medina	Episode: "Homeward Bound"
2017	Dating Game Killer	Rodney Alcala	TV film
2019	Broad City	Johnny	2 episodes
2019	High Maintenance	Arturo	Episode: "Proxy"
2019	RuPaul's Drag Race	Himself	Judge, Season 11, episode: "Diva Worship"
2019	Law & Order: Special Victims Unit	Carlos Hernandez	Episode: "Murdered at a Bad Address"
2020	I Know This Much Is True	Sergeant Mercado	Episode: "One"
2020	United We Fall	Chuy	Main role
2020	Social Distance	Santiago Villareal	Episode: "A Celebration of the Human Life Cycle"
2021–2022	Law & Order: Organized Crime	Sergeant William "Bill" Brewster	Recurring role, 13 episodes
2024	The Good Doctor	Carl	Episode: "Faith"
2025	St. Denis Medical	Eddie	Episode: "50 cc's of Kindness"
2025	Deli Boys	Chacho	Episode: "Confetti Boys"

=== Other media ===
Year	Title	Role	Notes
2002	Soldier of Fortune II: Double Helix	Domingo Sánchez	Voice; video game
2011	"I Wanna Go" (Britney Spears)	Guillermo	Music video
2014	"Run" (Jay-Z and Beyoncé)	Himself	Music video
