= Myfanwy Macleod =

Canadian artist (born 1961)

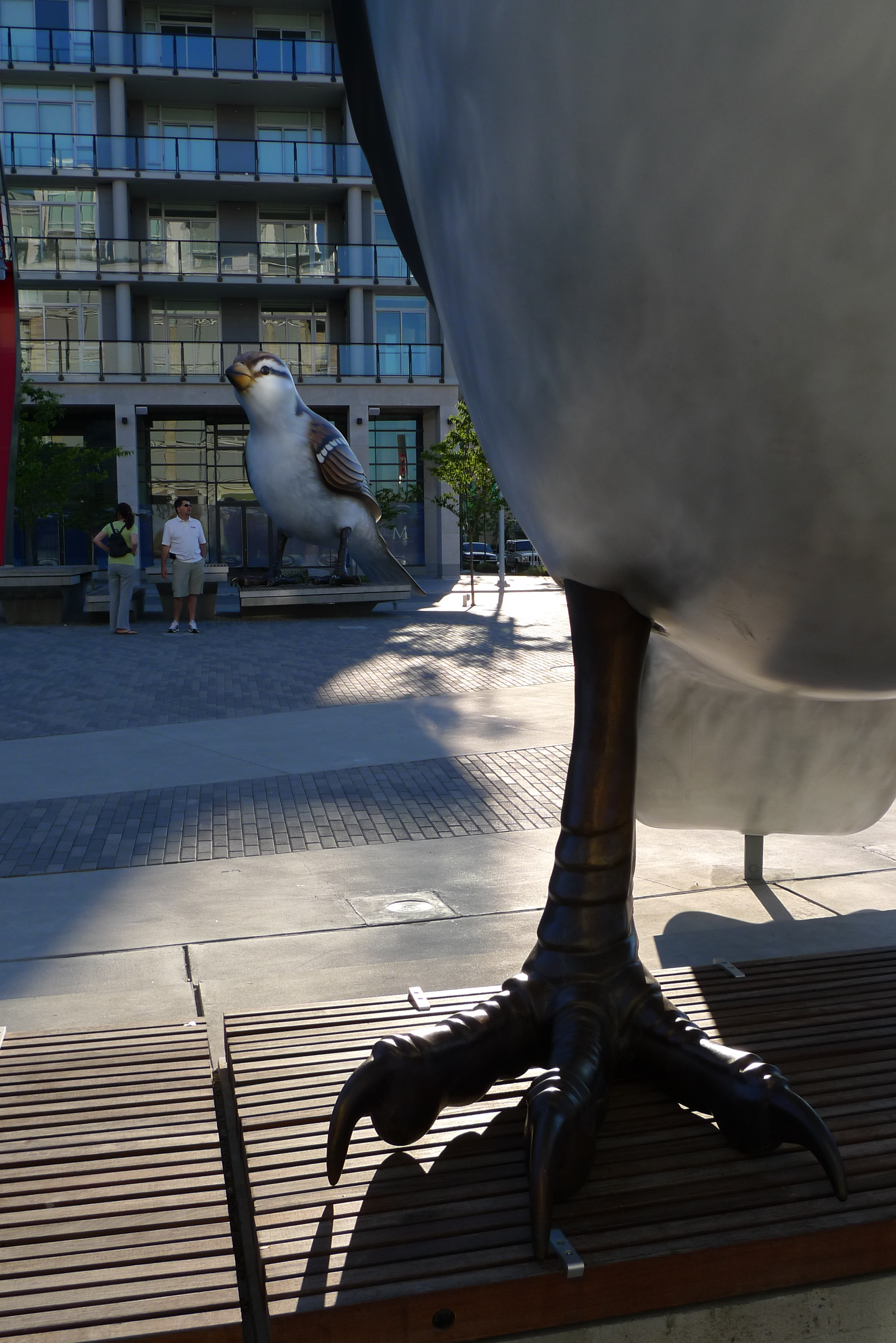
- Myfanwy Macleod's The Birds (2010) sculpture
- Born: 1961 (age 64–65); London, Ontario
- Education: Concordia University
- Alma mater: University of British Columbia
- Known for: sculptor with exhibited work in Canada, the United States of America, and Europe
- Notable work: Whole Lotta Love
- Awards: La Fondation André Piolat (1995), VIVA award from the Doris and Jack Shadbolt Foundation

Myfanwy MacLeod (born 1961) is a Canadian artist who lives, and works, in Vancouver, British Columbia. She has exhibited work in Canada, the United States of America, and Europe. MacLeod received an award from La Fondation André Piolat (1995), and a VIVA award from the Doris and Jack Shadbolt Foundation (1999). She has work in public, and private collections, including at the National Art Gallery of Canada, and the Vancouver Art Gallery. She is a member of the Royal Canadian Academy of Arts.

== Early life ==
MacLeod grew up between Oakville, Ontario, and London, Ontario. Upon completing high school, she traveled throughout Europe. Coming back to Canada, MacLeod attended Concordia University, in Montreal, Quebec, where she studied film before changing her major to visual arts.

MacLeod uses humor, satire, allusions to pop culture, and often references various folklore traditions in her work. She takes interest in how an image or object can be transformed to change its meaning. Since the 1990s, MacLeod has become known for creating art that extends across, and links together, high culture with mass entertainment. In recent work, MacLeod directs focus towards how popular culture has portrayed masculinity through the lens of modernist art history. Artistic mediums that MacLeod works in are sculpture, drawing, painting, and photography, performance video, and sound installation. MacLeod has also written works, including published essays, and an artist book titled Whole Lotta Love (2012).

== Education ==
MacLeod attended Concordia University in Montreal, Quebec, where she earned a Bachelor of Fine Arts in 1990. In 1994, MacLeod completed an independent study at École nationale supérieure des Beaux-Arts in Paris, France. MacLeod completed her Master of Fine Arts at the University of British Columbia in Vancouver, British Columbia in 1995.

== Teaching appointments ==
MacLeod has taught in Vancouver, at the University of British Columbia in 1995, Emily Carr University of Art and Design from 2001 to 2006, as well as teaching as an assistant professor at the University of Western Ontario, in London, Ontario, from 2007 to 2008.

== Group exhibitions ==
=== Bounce (2002) ===
MacLeod was part of Bounce, an exhibition showcasing three Vancouver-based emerging artists, held at the Power Plant Contemporary Art Gallery in Toronto, Ontario. Curated by Philip Monk, Bounce included works by Myfanwy MacLeod, Brian Jungen, and Damian Moppett. Bounce was an exhibition primarily based on sculpture, and included sketches and drawings. Works by MacLeod included in Bounce were: The Tiny Kingdom (2001), Wood For The People, (2002), and A Shady Place (2002). Placed with one another, these works reference to the "hillbilly" portrayed through pop culture.

=== Hammertown (2002–2004) ===
Hammertown was a touring exhibition curated by Reid Shier and co-presented by the Fruitmarket Gallery in Edinburgh, Scotland (2002), Contemporary Art Gallery in Vancouver (2002), and the Winnipeg Art Gallery, Manitoba (2004). MacLeod's work was presented alongside Geoffrey Farmer, Brian Jungen, Euan Macdonald, Luane Martineau, Damian Moppett, Shannon Oksanen, and Kevin Schmidt.

MacLeod's use of enormous scale, weight, and minimalism is conveyed through the inclusion of Our Mutual Friend (2002), a wooden carved sculpture that measures nineteen inches long, and has a circumference of ten inches. Our Mutual Friend refers to a Charles Dicken's novel, and is a visual example of MacLeod's interest with satire, and disembodied parts.

== Work in Scotland ==
In the spring of 2005, MacLeod was part of the three-month-long Glenfiddich Distilleries artist-in-residence program. During the residency, MacLeod documented her experience through photography, sculpture, and drawing. She recorded specific aspects of the area surrounding the distilleries, and notably- the deterioration of buildings on the land that Glenfiddich Distilleries inhabits. MacLeod was the first Canadian artist to be invited to this residency, and was one of seven international artists attending the residency. The collection of work created through the Glenfiddich Distilleries artist in residence program was shown at the Contemporary Art Gallery in 2006, in an exhibition titled Where I Have Lived and What I Have Lived For.

== Solo exhibitions ==
=== Myfanwy MacLeod: A Brief Overview of Personology (2000) ===
MacLeod's exhibition, A Brief Overview of Personology, was created for the Charles H. Scott Gallery in Vancouver, British Columbia, and was curated by Cate Rimmer A Brief Overview of Personology contained several works by MacLeod that were under the themes surrounding the use of self-help books, consumerism, and comedy, creating a dynamic setting of satire. MacLeod pulls inspiration from Tracy Cabot's How To Make a Man Fall in Love With You, a self-help book and appropriates illustrations from the book, putting them into the realm of fine art for public viewing. Works by MacLeod include four silkscreen prints titled How To Make a Man Fall in Love With You (2000), a wood sculpture called One Week (2000), twelve ink drawings on vellum paper based on film stills (2000), and The Greeter (2000), a video projection where MacLeod poses as a greeter that can be found in big box department stores.

=== The Tiny Kingdom (2001) ===
The Tiny Kingdom (2000) is a wood and mixed media based sculpture, measuring fourteen feet high, four feet long, and four feet wide. The Tiny Kingdom is a full-size scale of an outhouse, inspired by the one used in the film Chitty Chitty Bang Bang (1968). It was first shown in 2001 at the Or Gallery in Vancouver, British Columbia. The Tiny Kingdom is "intended to function as a place of reflection and solitude", and "foregrounds the anxious relations between art and society, country and city, colony and imperialist nation". MacLeod alludes to the idea of Marcel Dumchamp's 'Ready Made,' and combines it with references to pop culture, and folklore. The Tiny Kingdom is now in the permanent collection at the National Art Gallery of Canada.

=== Where I Lived and What I Lived For (2006) ===
The work that MacLeod created at Glenfiddich Distilleries was presented in 2006 at the Contemporary Art Gallery in Vancouver, British Columbia. With the inclusion of photography, this exhibition featured work of MacLeod's that stood out from her previous pieces, as photography is not a medium MacLeod used often in her practice before this residency. Works included in Where I Lived and What I Lived For range from large-scale photographs, drawings, to sculpture, and installations. This exhibition showcases the influence Scotland had on her. MacLeod has described her experience as a "voyage of discovery", and said that "Scotland offered [her] the chance to approach [her] work in a different way".

=== Myfanwy MacLeod, or There and Back Again (2013–2014) ===
Myfanwy MacLeod, or There And Back Again is a retrospective art exhibition that includes work by MacLeod made within the previous decade. It explores 1970s pop-culture, both in real and imagined ways, following a theme that references minimalism. The name of the exhibition alludes to JRR Tolkien's literary piece The Hobbit, and 1970s cultural references, including Led Zeppelin. Myfanwy MacLeod, or There and Back Again also hints at the idea of the Bildungsroman.

Myfanwy MacLeod, or There And Back Again took place in two separate sites- in 2013, it was exhibited at Museum London, Ontario. In 2014, the exhibit was shown at the Vancouver Art Gallery, in British Columbia. The exhibition was curated by Cassandra Getty, curator for the Museum London, and Grant Arnold, Audain curator for British Columbia Art at The Vancouver Art Gallery.

Having been born in London, Ontario in 1961, MacLeod spent her "formative years" immersed in the "cool-culture" of rock and roll, muscle cars, and feathered hair. Myfanwy MacLeod, or There And Back Again showcases the nostalgia that MacLeod has for the past. Hosting the exhibition in two specific locations, MacLeod bridges the gap between then and now by exhibiting the work in both her childhood hometown of London Ontario, and in Vancouver, British Columbia, the current city where she resides.

The show contains a collection of work that MacLeod had made over ten years preceding Myfanwy MacLeod, or There And Back Again, and includes rock band and movie posters, soft porn magazines, snap shot photographs, origami, folk crafts, and children's crafts.

At the exhibition held at the Vancouver Art Gallery, MacLeod adopted the role of the curator, alongside Grant Arnold, and curated Artist's Choice Cock and Bull (2014). This component of the exhibition was based on hybridity, combining the works by MacLeod exhibited at Museum London with chosen pieces from the Vancouver Art Gallery's permanent collection, following the theme of a "Cock and Bull story". By only including work created by men in Artist’s Choice Cock and Bull, MacLeod surmises how different means of displaying artwork can draw attention to the ambiguity of working as a feminist within the realm of contemporary art. In Artist's Choice Cock and Bull, the exhibition was reorganized from the traditional layout presented at Museum London, to one that plays even more on the idea of "Sex, Drugs, and Rock and Roll".

The exhibition held in Vancouver British Columbia contained three additional pieces by MacLeod that were not shown in London, Ontario. These pieces were Albert Walker (2014), Dragon (2014), and Presence (2013). Presence, a small sculpture placed on a dolly referencing an album by Led Zeppelin, creates a link between heavy metal music of the 1970s, and minimalism. Dragon, is a photomural on paper paralleling MacLeod's Albert Walker, which is a sculptural installation piece that takes form as an entertainment center- furniture that one could find housing a television in a middle-class home. This entertainment center holds twelve enlarged buds of marijuana, which were duplicated through three-dimensional print and cast in nylon. The buds used in Albert Walker were painted using chameleon paint, a paint that, once applied, changes colour depending on the direction and lighting one is looking at the object in. Through the use of three dimensional printing technologies, MacLeod alludes to the fact that the rarely found strain of marijuana known as "Albert Walker" can only be "reproduced through cloning". Albert Walker is also the name of a Canadian-born man that committed major fraud, and murder.

MacLeod has included references to music, particularly the heavy metal genre of the 1970s, showcasing her connection to and nostalgia of the genre. MacLeod alludes to the band Led Zeppelin in some of her work, including Whole Lotta Love, an artist publication created in 2012. Stack, 2013, is an installation of screen prints on canvas that resembles a stack of three by six "larger than life" Marshall speakers. Some pieces within Myfanwy MacLeod, or There And Back Again are named after Led Zeppelin songs, including Ramble On, 2013- a 1977 Camaro Rally Sport presented on a steel stand and a sculpture made up of a mannequin, Led Zeppelin T-shirt, and beer cans titled Living, Loving Maid (She's Just a Woman) (2013).

Through the art of origami, MacLeod adds geometry to images of women found in playboy magazines. MacLeod uses the center-folds of the magazines, and contorts the image by folding it directly, playing on the humour in the taboo within the forms. MacLeod touched on a more serious topic by including images of British Columbia born Dorothy Stratten, an actress and playboy model from the 1970s with a shocking and grim story. The geometry in the origami forms is reflected throughout the exhibition, in pieces such like "Don't Stop Dreaming", 2004, made up of two three dimensional geometric shaped speakers, compact discs, carpet, and a wallpaper mural, bridging rock and roll with the origami presented. Don’t Stop Dreaming also reflects on previous work relating to the theme of self-help books.

Macleod has explored topics of folklore traditions in Hex series (2009). Exhibited at the Catriona Jeffries gallery in Vancouver, British Columbia in 2009, and in Myfanwy MacLeod, or There And Back Again in 2013 and 2014, Hex Series is a collection of hand painted signs based on patterns found in Dutch culture in Eastern Pennsylvania. Hex Series contains symbols that have distinct meanings. The series is inspired by traditional Hex signs, and are commonly found on barn doors. By recreating these symbols, and placing them in the unusual setting of an art exhibition, MacLeod creates a parallel meaning by showcasing them through a conceptual standpoint.

== Commissioned pieces ==
=== The Birds (2010) ===
The Birds was MacLeod's first major public art commission, and is situated in Vancouver British Columbia. Partially inspired by Alfred Hitchcock's film The Birds (1963), The Birds is a large sculpture of two house sparrows, birds that are not indigenous to British Columbia. This sculpture challenges the idea of place and impossibility.

=== Playtime (2016) ===
Playtime is a site specific public art piece situated in Vancouver at the British Columbia (BC) Women's and Children's Hospital. Created as the first public collaboration between MacLeod and Vancouver-based artist Shannon Oksanen, this piece was commissioned by the BC Children's and BC Women's Redevelopment Project. Playtime is an interactive art piece integrated into the Wellness Walkway of the BC Women's and Children's hospital.

Using the idea of playground design as a starting point, MacLeod and Oksanen created five “modernist play” sculptures that are painted black and white, and are made out of glass fibre and concrete. The largest sculptures are two tall "sister" forms titled Two Figures in Orbit. They are a nod to the modernist sculptor Barbara Hepworth, from whom the titles for the individual sculptures are borrowed. The figures are shaped like bubble braids. One of the figures has wavy vertical stripes, while the other has dots. The second-largest figure, titled Dryad, is striped. Other figures are The Family Man (a checkered form that reads as a stationary seesaw , an X, or an object from the game of "jacks"), The Magic Stones (four small striped rounded forms), and The Musician (shaped like a knuckle ring, patterned with triangles). Grouped together, the sculptures are collectively titled Playtime.

Playtime’s groupings and forms evoke the different constructions of family. The rounded forms and forms with holes in them relate to the body, healthy and unhealthy. The piece is intended to be interactive.

== Published writing ==
- "Just Kidding: Kyla Mallett", Canadian Art (Summer 2004)
- "WWJD (What Would Judd Do)" CJ Press (2008)
- "Whole Lotta Love" - Publication Studio, Vancouver. (2012)
- Master Rabbit I Saw, Capilano Review
