= Kiss the Bride (2007 film) =

2007 film by C. Jay Cox

- Kiss the Bride film poster
- Directed by: C. Jay Cox
- Written by: Ty Lieberman
- Produced by: C. Jay Cox; Richard Santilena; Bob Schuck
- Starring: Tori Spelling; Philipp Karner; James O'Shea; Amber Benson; Garrett M. Brown; Brooke Dillman; Steve Sandvoss; Tess Harper; Robert Foxworth; Joanna Cassidy
- Cinematography: Carl Bartels
- Music by: Ben Holbrook
- Distributed by: Regent Releasing
- Release dates: July 23, 2007 (Outfest Film Festival); April 18, 2008 (United States)
- Running time: 100 minutes
- Country: United States
- Language: English
- Box office: $32,033

Kiss the Bride is a 2007 American romantic comedy film directed by C. Jay Cox and starring Tori Spelling, Philipp Karner and James O'Shea. Ty Lieberman's script was the product of Outfest's first Screenwriters Lab. The film premiered at Outfest on July 23, 2007, and later had a limited release on April 18, 2008.

== Plot ==
Ten years after leaving his conservative Arizona hometown, Matt is a successful editor and chief photographer for the LA lifestyle magazine Queery. Though he has no problems meeting men, he usually dumps them after they fail to measure up to his high school flame, Ryan. Matt and his assistant Stephanie are on the verge of closing the "Big Gay Wedding" issue when he receives an invitation to Ryan's nuptials to Alex—who, to Matt's surprise, is actually a woman. Described by Stephanie as "so 'My Best Friend's Gay Wedding,'" Matt races off to rescue his former love from this woman who must have trapped him into marriage.

== Cast ==
- Tori Spelling as Alex
- Philipp Karner as Matt
- James O'Shea as Ryan
- Amber Benson as Elly
- Joanna Cassidy as Evelyn
- Garrett M. Brown as Gerald
- Tess Harper as Barbara
- Robert Foxworth as Wayne
- E. E. Bell as Dan
- Steve Sandvoss as Sean
- Michael Medico as Chris
- Jane Cho as Stephanie
- Ralph Cole Jr. as Barry
- Brooke Dillman as Virginia
- Dean McDermott as Plumber
- Elizabeth Kell as Monica
- Dean Nolen as Reverend
- Connie Sawyer as Aunt Minnie
- Les Williams as Larry
- Charlie David as Joey
- Paul Meacham as Waiter Worthie
- Kyle Davis as Officer Harley
- Mary Gillis as Saleslady

== Critical reception ==
Nick Pinkerton of LA Weekly called the film "the most ignoble outing in bi-curious screen hijinks since France produced Poltergay." Peter Debruge of Variety said that while there are entertaining moments, director "Cox and his TV-caliber cast simply aren't cut out for the challenge". Elizabeth Weitzman of the New York Daily News wrote, "At first, the supremely silly vibe offers a fair amount of fun. But then Cox switches gears and gets serious, which is a huge mistake. A movie this preposterous should never have been played straight." Maitland McDonagh of TV Guide gave a positive review, calling it a "light, formulaic romantic comedy that plays with genre conventions just enough to make its cotton-candy charms feel almost fresh". In Creative Loafing, David Lee Simmons said "every time the two male leads try to get serious, the filmmakers' clumsy comedy routines get in the way, whether it's Matt being mistaken for a male stripper upon stumbling into Alex's bachelorette party, or the dim-witted homophobia of Ryan's two groomsmen. Despite the presence of vets such as Tess Harper, Robert Foxworth and Joanna Cassidy…Kiss the Bride can't rise above its amateurish foundation".

== Soundtrack ==
- "U Found Me" (Levi Kreis, Darci Monet) - Levi Kreis
- "Hardly A Hero" (Kreis, Monet) - Levi Kreis
- "We're Okay" (Kreis) - Levi Kreis (end credits)
- "Drive" - Brian Kent
