= The Birds (sculpture) =

Sculpture by Myfanwy MacLeod in Vancouver, British Columbia, Canada

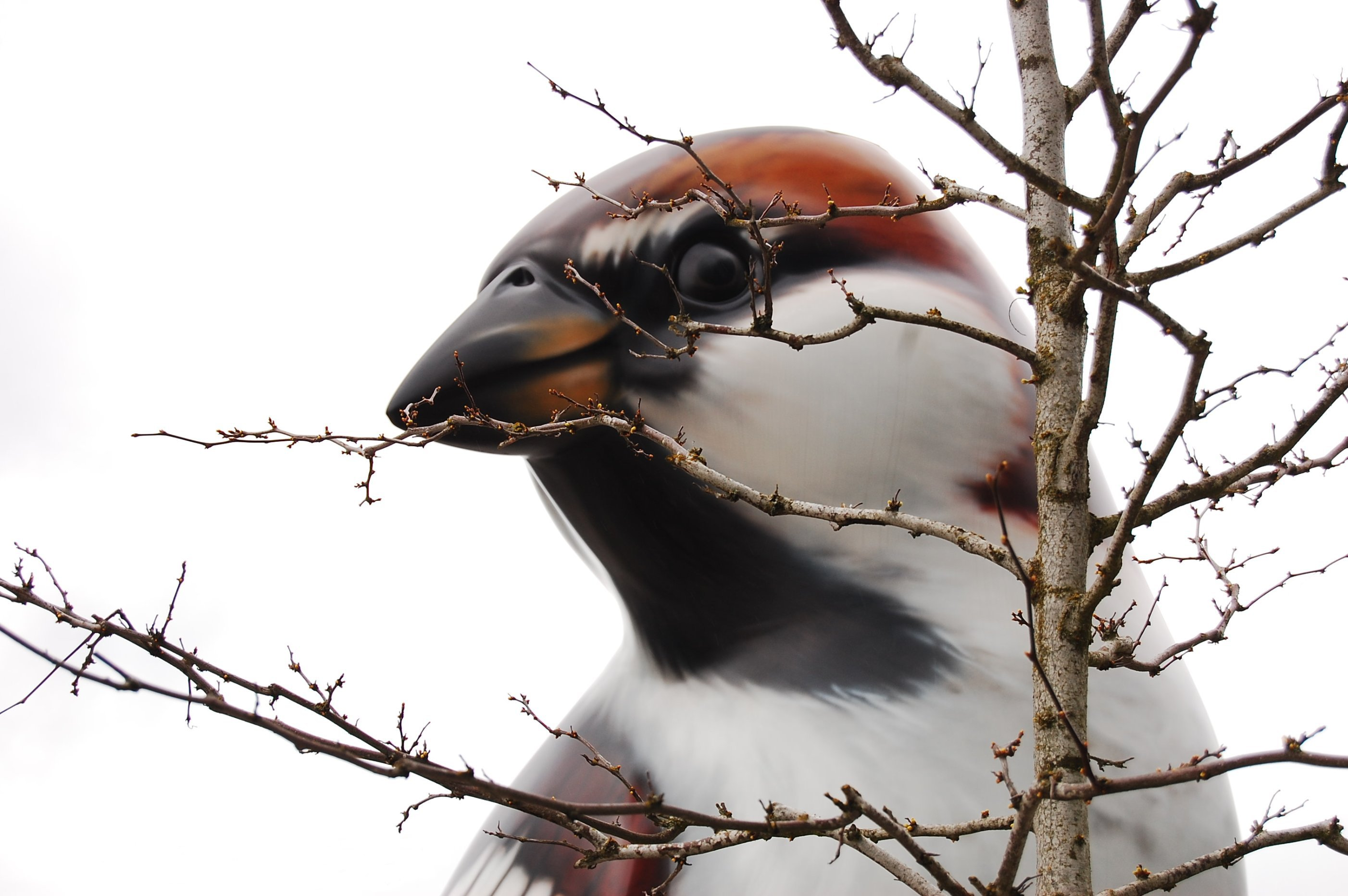
- The sculpture seen through trees in 2011
- Artist: Myfanwy MacLeod
- Year: 2010
- Type: Sculpture
- Subject: House sparrows
- Location: Vancouver, British Columbia, Canada; 49°16′17.06″N 123°6′23.38″W

The Birds comprises a pair of outdoor sculptures depicting house sparrows by Myfanwy MacLeod, installed after the 2010 Winter Olympics in Southeast False Creek Olympic Plaza, which served as the site of the 2010 Olympic Village in Vancouver, British Columbia, Canada. The work depicts one male and one female house sparrow, each approximately five metres tall, and was the first piece approved by the city's Olympic and Paralympic Public Art Program. It was inspired by Alfred Hitchcock's 1963 film of the same name, sustainability, the site's history as a shipyard, and immigration.

They were removed on November 23, 2017 for repairs, but later restored to their original location.

== Background ==
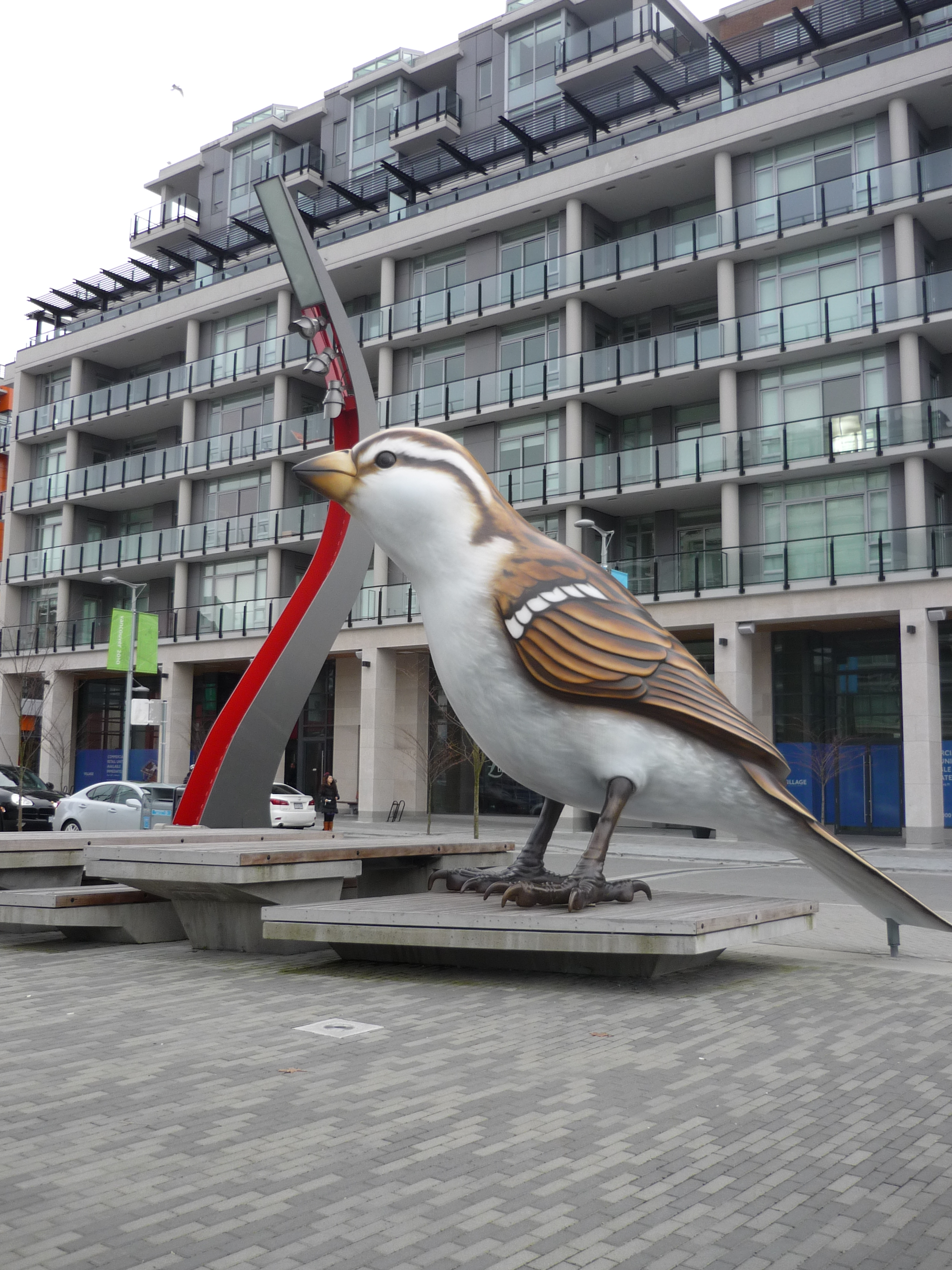
One of the house sparrows (2011)

The Birds was the first work of public art to be approved under the city's Olympic and Paralympic Public Art Program. It was installed in Southeast False Creek Olympic Plaza, which served as the site of the 2010 Olympic Village, in April 2010. MacLeod was inspired by Alfred Hitchcock's 1963 film of the same name. She has said of the piece, "I think it boils down to wanting to make something sublime for the plaza – that is something beautiful, but frightening at the same time." She has also said of its inspiration:

We have a very kind of romantic relationship to nature and I'm interested in playing with that romantic notion and kind of inverting it, sort of like how the birds attack in the film… And the scale of [the installation] has that similar effect, where our relationship to the birds has changed. Because normally when you're on the plaza, you see little birds and you're this giant thing. Here it's the opposite: You're the small thing in relationship to the giant birds.

The Birds was also inspired by sustainability and the site's history as a shipyard, where sailors often wore sparrow tattoos. The sculptures have been called an "ode to immigration" based on MacLeod's interest in "alien species" and when non-native species are introduced to an environment (the house sparrow is not native to North America). MacLeod said: "My work for the Olympic Village tries to infuse the ordinary and commonplace sparrow with a touch of the ridiculous and the sublime. Locating this artwork in an urban plaza not only highlights what has become the 'natural' environment of the sparrow, it also reinforces the 'small' problem of introducing a foreign species and the subsequent havoc wreaked upon our ecosystems."

The sculptures were produced by Heavy Industries, with some bodywork completed by Semi-Rigid Plastic Parts Repair. The Birds was the last of the public art program's works to be installed, despite being the first approved.

== Description ==
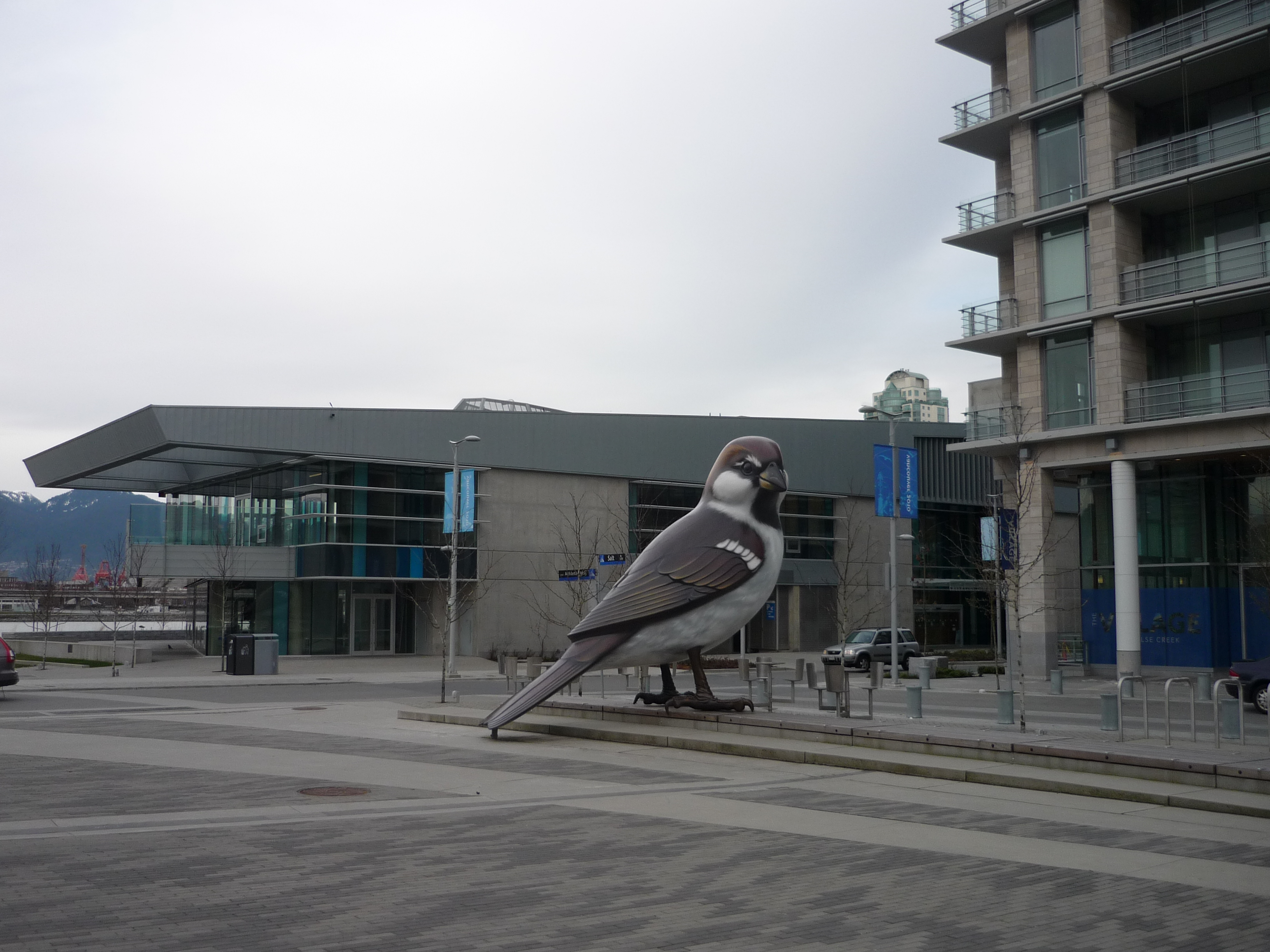
One of the sculptures in 2011

The work depicts one male and one female house sparrow, each between 4.5 and 5.5 m (15 and 18 ft) tall, or approximately 50 times life size. The birds have been described as realistic and "massive yet friendly-looking". Their bodies are made from hard coated expanded polystyrene (EPS) foam, coated with a polyurea skin and airbrush painted, all clad around a steel armature. Their cast bronze legs were sealed with wax. According to Heavy, the EPS form pieces were "glued together with pressure-sensitive adhesive, specifically formulated for bonding EPS to itself and other materials".

== Reception ==
Marsha Lederman of The Globe and Mail called the sculptures "huge and intimidating and a bit creepy", but acknowledged the artist's intent. Explaining connection between immigration and sparrows specifically, she wrote that the birds were introduced "to satisfy cultural nostalgia for homesick Europeans. The birds were alien, exotic. They're now ubiquitous. Part of the everyday landscape. Barely noticed… Not these." Tuija Seipell of Jaunted said the sparrows were reminiscent of the bird that Flick and the Blueberries build to scare the Hoppers in the 1998 film A Bug's Life.

== See also ==
- "The Birds" (story), a 1952 novelette by Daphne du Maurier and the inspiration for Hitchcock's film
