= Fling (film) =

- Theatrical release poster
- Directed by: John Stewart Muller
- Written by: John Stewart Muller; Laura Boersma
- Produced by: John Stewart Muller; Laura Boersma; Brandon Routh (co-producer)
- Starring: Brandon Routh; Steve Sandvoss; Courtney Ford; Shoshana Bush; Nick Wechsler; Ellen Hollman
- Cinematography: Frederick W. Schroeder
- Edited by: Sam Restivo; Ben Waters
- Music by: Nick Urata
- Production company: Steele Films
- Distributed by: Peace Arch Entertainment
- Release date: October 18, 2008
- Running time: 98 minutes
- Country: United States
- Language: English

Fling, internationally titled Lie to Me, is an independent comedy film about a couple navigating the hazards of an open relationship. It is the directorial debut of director John Stewart Muller and stars Brandon Routh, Steve Sandvoss, Courtney Ford, Nick Wechsler, Shoshana Bush and Ellen Hollman. It is the first feature from Santa Monica-based Steele Films and was written and produced by John Stewart Muller and his partner Laura Boersma.

Fling features Brandon Routh in his first lead role since Superman Returns. It premiered to a sold-out crowd at the 2008 Newport Beach Film Festival on April 26 in the Lido Theater on the Balboa Peninsula. The film received an award for "Outstanding Achievement in Filmmaking" from the festival's jury.

Fling had its official Los Angeles premiere on October 18 at the Fine Arts Theatre on Wilshire Blvd. as part of the 2008 LA Femme Film Festival.

Shortly thereafter, it had its sold-out East Coast premiere on November 7 at the 2008 Fort Lauderdale International Film Festival. On November 14, Fling had its Midwest premiere at the Screenland Theatre in the Crossroads District of Kansas City, Missouri.

Fling had its international premiere at the 2008 Bahamas International Film Festival on December 5, 2008. North American distribution is being handled by Peace Arch Entertainment and the DVD was released on March 24, 2009.

== Plot ==
By all appearances, Samantha (Courtney Ford) and Mason (Steve Sandvoss) are the perfect couple: young, attractive, successful, and madly in love. At her sister Allison's (Ellen Hollman) idyllic spring wedding, Samantha, a twenty-something fashion designer, finds herself drawn back into the arms of her ex-boyfriend, James (Brandon Routh), a surprise wedding guest. Meanwhile, Mason, a published novelist just shy of thirty, spends a flirtatious evening culminating in a hot tub encounter with his best friend Luke's (Nick Wechsler) 18-year-old sister, Olivia (Shoshana Bush). Sneaking out of James's room, Sam is startled by Mason and confesses her affair. But Mason's reaction is not what is expected.

== Cast ==
- Brandon Routh as James
- Steve Sandvoss as Mason
- Courtney Ford as Sam
- Shoshana Bush as Olivia
- Nick Wechsler as Luke
- Ellen Hollman as Alison
- Deborah Rush as Katherine
- Mousa Kraish as Patrick
- Diana Newton as Amy
- Mary Kay Riley as Brooke
- Erin McGrane as Becky
- Ginny Weirick as Jessica
- Makinna Ridgway as Jenni
- Brandon Lee White as Josh
- Lahcen Anajjar as Tom
- Tamar Kaprelian as Kim
- Brenner Barclay as Pete
- Frank Munroe as Party Guy

== Production ==
Fling features original music by Nick Urata, the frontman for the band DeVotchKa, whose work on the Little Miss Sunshine soundtrack resulted in a Grammy nomination.

The film was shot in and around Kansas City, Missouri.

== Reception ==
Robert W. Butler of The Kansas City Star gave Fling 3/4, calling it "an impressive first feature."
