= Exquisite Corpse (film) =

- Film poster
- Directed by: Scott David Russell
- Written by: Scott David Russell
- Produced by: Michael Anderson; Christopher Sepulveda
- Starring: Steve Sandvoss; Nicole Vicius; Guillermo Díaz; Tessa Thompson
- Cinematography: Nikolas Smith
- Edited by: Matt Tegtmeier
- Music by: Jonathan Licht
- Release date: August 20, 2010 (Berlin Fantasy Filmfest)
- Running time: 102 minutes
- Country: United States
- Language: English

Exquisite Corpse is a 2010 horror film written and directed by Scott David Russell. It stars Steve Sandvoss, Nicole Vicius and Guillermo Díaz.

== Plot summary ==
A medical student (Steve Sandvoss) is working on a research project and discovers that he is able to reanimate recently deceased mice. He takes a break from his work to go on a trip with three friends. He admits to his friend Sophia (Nicole Vicius) that he loves her - but shortly after this she falls into a nearby lake and drowns.

Using the methods from his research project he is able to revive her, but the process requires that he extract the hormone Oxytocin from a recently dead corpse. He murders two women, and attempts to murder a third, in the process of keeping Sophia alive. His actions arouse the suspicion of his friends and the campus police.

In a twist at the end of the film, Sophia remembers the circumstances of her death, which changes the audience's perceptions of the actions of one of the main characters in the story.
