= Shoshana Bush =

American actress

- Born: 1988 or 1989 (age 37–38); Tiburon, California, U.S.
- Occupation: Actress
- Years active: 2005–present

Shoshana Bush (born 1988 or 1989) is an American actress. She is perhaps best known for her role in the film Dance Flick (2009).

== Career ==
Shoshana Bush is a native of Tiburon, California. She has made guest appearances on television series such as CSI: Miami, Moonlight and Ghost Whisperer. In 2007, she co-starred alongside Tom Arnold in Palo Alto and then appeared in the 2008 film Fling. She made her feature debut in her best-known role to date as Megan White in Dance Flick which was released on May 22, 2009. The film grossed $28,728,151 worldwide. The same year, Bush had a small role in the film Fired Up.

== Filmography ==
Film
| Year | Film | Role | Notes |
|---|---|---|---|
| 2007 | Palo Alto | Audrey | |
| 2008 | Fling | Olivia | |
| 2009 | Fired Up | Girl | |
| 2009 | Dance Flick | Megan White | |
| 2010 | Babe | Ashley | |
| 2012 | Broken Roads | Madalyn Gardner | |
| 2017 | The Other Place | The Sister | |
| 2019 | The Laundromat | Rebecca Rubinstein | |
Television
| Year | Title | Role | Notes |
| 2005 | CSI: Miami | Teenage Girl in Bank | 1 episode |
| 2007 | Moonlight | Chloe Jones | 1 episode |
| 2009 | Ghost Whisperer | Makeena | 1 episode |
| 2010 | The Secret Life of the American Teenager | Haylie | 2 episodes |
| 2010 | The League | Lanie aka "Sexy Brownie Girl" | 2 episodes |
| 2010 | Wizards of Waverly Place | Tyler | 1 episode |
| 2013 | Awkward | Hunter | 1 episode |
| 2014 | Men at Work | Dylan | 1 episode |
| 2017 | Versus | | Main role |
| 2017 | Tough Cookie | Lilla | TV movie |
| 2019 | On My Block | Amber | Recurring role |
