= Max Sandvoss =

American farmer and former actor (born 1980)

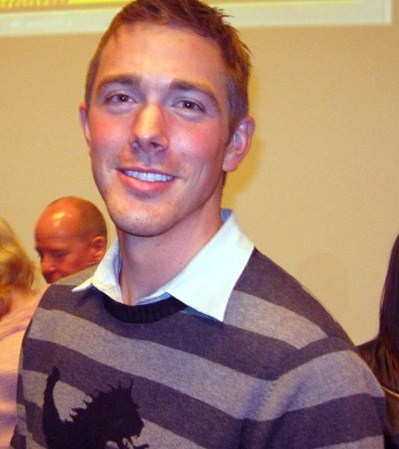
- Sandvoss in 2008
- Born: Stephen James Sandvoss; June 23, 1980 (age 46); New York City, U.S.
- Education: Harvard University (AB)
- Occupation: Actor

Stephen "Max" James Sandvoss (born 1980) is an American businessman, farmer, and former actor.

== Early life and education ==
Sandvoss was born in New York City, New York. His mother, Joyce, is American-born, and his father, Rolf Herman George Sandvoss, was Swiss-born.

After attending school in the suburbs of New York City, and in Connecticut, Sandvoss studied Chinese, thinking about going into international business, but changed his studies to poetry and prose writing, graduating cum laude from Harvard University in 2002.

== Career ==
Sandvoss’ break as an actor came in 2003 when he landed the role of a football star competing against Will Estes in the NBC drama series American Dreams and as the main character in the independent film Latter Days in the same year.

His second feature film was 2005's Rumor Has It, starring Jennifer Aniston, Kevin Costner, Mark Ruffalo and Shirley MacLaine. Sandvoss was also cast in the short film Waning Moon, directed by Luca Colombo, which debuted in August 2006 at a Swiss Film Festival in Lugano.

In June 2006, Sandvoss began filming the horror film Buried Alive, in the role of Danny. The film was released on DVD in October 2007. In late 2006, it was announced that he would reunite with director/writer C. Jay Cox in a supporting role in the film Kiss the Bride, released in 2008.

In May 2007, Sandvoss took on the role of Mason Michael Finch in the indie film Fling (formerly titled Lie to Me), filmed on location in Kansas City, Missouri. The film had its premiere on 26 April 2008, at the Newport Beach Film Festival during the time that Sandvoss was filming a pilot for the Sci-Fi channel, titled "Revolution". It was announced in November 2008 that he would appear in the independent film Exquisite Corpse.

After working as a film and television actor from 2003 to 2010, Sandvoss founded a dairy and creamery in East Bethany, New York, with his brother Trystan Sandvoss. Since January 2018, he has held the position of national sales and marketing director at Old Chatham Sheepherding Co.

== Filmography ==
=== Film ===
Year	Title	Role	Notes
2003	Latter Days	Elder Aaron Davis	
2005	Rumor Has It	Scott	
2006	Price to Pay	Razor	
2007	Kiss the Bride	Sean	
2007	Buried Alive	Danny	
2008	Fling	Mason	
2010	Exquisite Corpse	Nicholas	

=== Television ===
Year	Title	Role	Notes
2003	American Dreams	Dave	Episode: "High Hopes"
2004	Dr. Vegas	Brad	Episode: "Pilot"
2005	Cold Case	Garrett Caine	Episode: "Ravaged"
2005	Nip/Tuck	Evan Bolton	Episode: "Tommy Bolton"
2006	The Inside	Corey Hall	3 episodes
2007	Grey's Anatomy	Jason	Episode: "Kung Fu Fighting"
2007	Judy's Got a Gun	Patrick	Television film
2009	Revolution	Chris Hart	Television film
2010	Miami Medical	Marc Tischer	Episode: "Pilot"
