= Like You Mean It =

- Directed by: Philipp Karner
- Written by: Philipp Karner
- Produced by: Jason Boegh; Thomas Ethan Harris; Philipp Karner
- Starring: Philipp Karner; Denver Milord; Gillian Shure; Hilary Ward; Andrew Dits; Claudia Graf
- Cinematography: Aaron Kovalchil
- Edited by: Dana Turken
- Production company: Round One
- Distributed by: Breaking Glass Pictures (US); TLA Releasing (France, Poland and UK)
- Release dates: 4 December 2015 (Image+Nation); 8 December 2015 (US)
- Running time: 90 minutes
- Country: United States
- Language: English

Like You Mean It is a 2015 American drama film directed by Philipp Karner, starring Karner, Denver Milord, Gillian Shure, Hilary Ward, Andrew Dits and Claudia Graf.

== Cast ==
- Philipp Karner as Mark
- Denver Milord as Jonah
- Gillian Shure as Nicole
- Hilary Ward as Perry
- Andrew Dits as Kyle
- Claudia Graf as Isabelle
- Adrian Quinonez as Craig
- Sheila Korsi as Eva
- Scotty Crowe as Yungtseng
- Kimberly Alexander as Newscaster
- Kathy Deitch as Receptionist
- Jason Boegh as Waiter
- Clayton Bailey as Wedding Guest
- Aida Lembo as Secretary
- Jeff Lorch as Auditioner

== Reception ==
Gary Goldstein of the Los Angeles Times wrote, "The last gasps of a romantic relationship between two very different men are intimately and delicately charted in the beautifully immersive, if decidedly somber, Like You Mean It."

Stephen Farber of The Hollywood Reporter called the film "well-acted but superficial", and wrote that its "poignant epiphany comes too late to redeem the one-note chronicle of the downfall of a handsome narcissist."
