= Philipp Karner =

American actor (born 1979)

- Born: July 15, 1979 (age 46); Vienna, Austria
- Occupations: Actor, Writer, Director
- Years active: 1991-present

Philipp Karner (born July 15, 1979) is an Austrian American actor, director, and screenwriter who is best known for starring in the film Kiss the Bride. He made his directorial debut with the 2015 film Like You Mean It.

== Early life ==
Philipp Karner was born July 15, 1979, in Vienna, Austria, where his parents were both social workers. He has a younger brother and younger sister.

Karner knew he wanted to be an actor from an early age. When he was 12, he was cast as the young Johann Strauss II in the Austrian television miniseries The Strauss Dynasty. After his year of military service in Austria, he moved to Paris, France, for the summer when he was 18. At age 19, he emigrated to the United States in the fall of 1997.

== Career ==
Karner studied acting at the Lee Strasberg Studio in New York City.

He appeared in a few off-Broadway plays, and in television shows such as CSI: Miami, Everwood, Sex and the City, The Sopranos, Will & Grace, and Without a Trace. He became more generally known after starring in the 2007 comedy film Kiss the Bride. He also appeared in the 2010 film Fair Game and the Swedish-German miniseries West of Liberty.

=== Writing, directing, and producing ===
Karner co-wrote and co-produced the 2013 film Diving Normal with friend and producing partner Scotty Crowe. He wrote, produced, and directed the 2015 motion picture Like You Mean It.

== Personal life ==
Karner lived in New York City after emigrating to the United States. He then moved to Los Angeles, California where he became an American citizen. He currently lives in Austin, Texas.

== Filmography ==
| Year | Film | Role | Other notes |
|---|---|---|---|
| 2001 | The Wind | Billy | Main Role |
| 2005 | Race You to the Bottom | Eric | |
| 2007 | Kiss the Bride | Matt | Main Role |
| 2007 | Corrosion | Jay | short film |
| 2010 | Fair Game | Walter | |
| 2011 | The Price of Happiness | Paul | |
| 2013 | Diving Normal | Fulton | Writer, producer |
| 2015 | The Morning After | Dan | |
| 2015 | Like You Mean It | Mark | Writer, director, producer |
| 2019 | Die Geschichte des Trümmermädchens Charlotte Schumann | Miller | |
| Year | Television series | Role | Other notes |
| 1991 | Strauss Dynasty | Young Johann Strauss | Mini-series; uncredited |
| 1999 | Sex and the City | Salesman | Episode: "The Caste System" |
| 2000 | The Sopranos | Caller #3 | Episode: "Guy Walks Into a Psychiatrist's Office" |
| 2001 | Will & Grace | Rocco | Episode: "Old-Fashioned Piano Party" |
| 2002 | Arli$$ | Brandon | Episode: "Playing It Safe" |
| 2003 | NYPD Blue | Tyler | Episode: "Keeping Abreast" |
| 2003 | What I Like About You | Cal | Episode: "I'm Sorry, So Sorry" |
| 2003 | Without a Trace | Rick Highland | Episode: "Coming Home" |
| 2004 | Everwood | Josh Walker | Episodes: "Forget Me Not" and "Controlling Interest" |
| 2004 | CSI: Miami | Adam Kalmenson | Episode: "Pirated" |
| 2005 | Charmed | Bob | Episode: "Desperate Housewitches" |
| 2006 | The Jake Effect | Tennis Stud | Episode: "Parent Teacher Conference" |
| 2010 | Melissa & Joey | Theo Morton | Episode: "Moving On" |
| 2011 | Castle | Jack Sinclair | Episode: "Demons" |
| 2014 | Mistresses | Sean | Episode: "Friends with Benefits" |
| 2019 | West of Liberty | Jack Almond | Episode: 6 episodes |
