= Brian Kent =

American musician

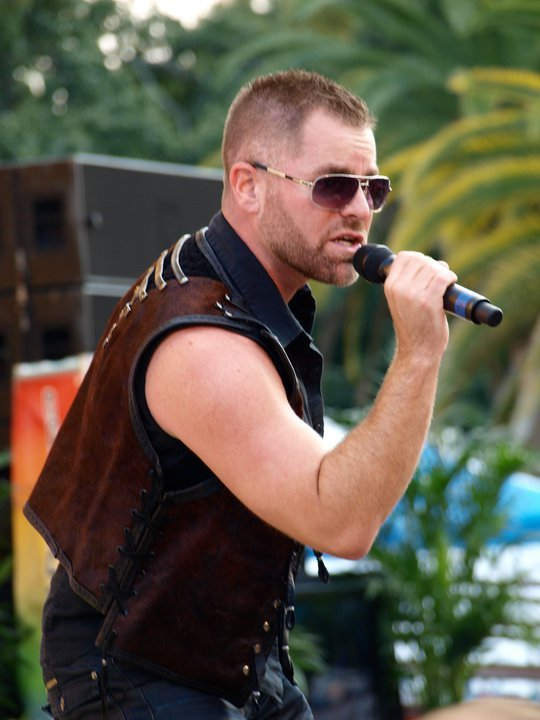
- Born: November 23, 1969 (age 56); Santa Monica, California
- Occupations: Musician, Singer-songwriter, CEO, Music Producer
- Years active: 2004–present
- Notable work: Breathe Life
- Website: www.briankentmusic.com

Brian Kent is an American musical artist.

== Musical career ==
From his album Breathe Life, Kent's single “Whatcha Doin’ To Me” entered the Billboard Dance Chart, peaking at No. 35 in 2009 with nine weeks on the chart. It also reached No. 1 on Sirius Satellite Radio's Hot 20 Chart. His next single was “I'll Find A Way”, which was subsequently nominated for the 2010 Out Music Single of The Year and Out Music Producer Of The Year. His music video for the single “I'm Not Crazy” was on the Logo TV top ten music video list for fifteen weeks. Kent was featured on Logo network's reality series, The A-List: New York, where Mike Ruiz shot and filmed his music video for Su-Su-Su-Superstar. He is also an event promoter and former co-owner and managing partner of San Francisco nightclub Beatbox. In addition to Kent's early musical activism, his music has been featured in such films as Violet Tendencies, BearCity, BearCity 2: The Proposal, and Kiss the Bride.

== Discography ==
- "Don't Stop Believin'" (2005)
- "I'm Not Crazy" (2005)
- "Breathe Life" (2007)
- "Breathe Life - The Remixes" (2007)
- "Whatcha Doin'To Me" (2009)
- "I'll Find A Way" (2010)
- "Su-Su-Su-Superstar" (2011)
- "With or Without You (Wayne G feat Brian Kent)" (2013)
- "On Every Page" (2014)
- "Just Say Yes (Toy Armada & DJ Grind feat Brian Kent)" (2019)
- "Proud" (2020)
- "Believe It or Not" (2022)
- "Carry Your Light" (2024)
- "Say Yes" (2025)
- "Take My Hand" (2026)

== Awards and nominations ==
Year	Category	Nominated work	Result
Outmusic Awards
2009	Outstanding Electro/Dance Song	"Breathe Life"	Won
2010	Outstanding Single of the Year	"I'll Find A Way"	Nominated
2012	Best Electronic/Dance Song of the Year	"Su-Su-Su-Superstar"	Nominated
2012	Best Music Video of the Year	"Su-Su-Su-Superstar"	Nominated
2012	Best CD Artwork	"Su-Su-Su-Superstar"	Nominated
USA Songwriting Competition
2010		"I'll Find A Way"	Finalist

== Filmography ==
=== Film ===
Year	Title	Role	Notes
2012	BearCity 2: The Proposal	Self	
