= April's Shower =

- Film poster
- Directed by: Trish Doolan
- Written by: Trish Doolan
- Produced by: Trish Doolan; Honey Labrador; Christopher Racster; Bill Shaffer
- Starring: Maria Cina; Trish Doolan; Randall Batinkoff; Euan Macdonald
- Music by: Jeff Cardoni
- Distributed by: Regent Releasing
- Release dates: October 15, 2003 (Hamburg Lesbian and Gay Film Festival); January 13, 2006 (United States)
- Running time: 98 minutes
- Country: United States
- Language: English

April's Shower is a 2003 romantic comedy film directed by and starring Trish Doolan. The film also stars Maria Cina and Randall Batinkoff. Doolan also served as writer, producer, and director for the film. The film was actually released as early as 2003 at the Hamburg Gay and Lesbian Film Festival and was subsequently released at other gay-themed film festivals in cities around the world, including San Francisco, Charlotte, Copenhagen, Tampa, Detroit, Rochester, and Dallas. The film gained wide but limited release in January 2006.

== Premise ==
A group of people are gathered for a wedding shower for April. At first, it seems to be a normal gathering for such an occasion but, as time goes on, secrets and stories begin to be revealed. Alex (Doolan) is a chef and a maid of honor at April's wedding. She ultimately reveals her true feelings which ends up taking an effect on everybody at the shower.

== Cast ==
- Trish Doolan as Alex
- Maria Cina as April
- Joe Tabbanella as Jake
- Denise Miller as Vicki
- Zack Ward as August
- Samantha Lemole as Rita
- Molly Cheek as Franny
- Victoria Reiniger as Mary Beth
- Euan Macdonald as Fergus
- Lara Harris as Kelly
- Delaina Mitchell as Spring Dawn
- Jane Booke as Devin
- Randall Batinkoff as Pauly
- Frank Grillo as Rocco
- Honey Labrador as Sasha
- Arly Jover as Sophie
- Gizelle D'Cole as Roxy
- Pamela Salem as Anna
- Precious Chong as Cake Girl
- Jeffrey Gorman as Torth
- Raymond O'Connor as Ted Burns
- Steve Portigiani as Billy
- John Hardison as Blake

== Reception ==
In a review for Out, Justin W. Ravitz said that the film was drowned by histrionics and featured characters with "sitcom personalities". Referring to the storyline of a lesbian leaving her girlfriend for a heterosexual lifestyle, he said that the film was "almost as insufferable as the real thing."
