= Rebekah Johnson =

American singer-songwriter

- Born: Cleveland, Ohio, United States
- Occupations: Singer, songwriter, actress
- Website: http://www.rebeccajordansmith.com

Rebecca Johnson, also credited as Rebekah and Rebecca Jordan, is an American singer-songwriter and actress from Ohio. She wrote the song "Beautiful Disaster" for Kelly Clarkson. Her own music is a mix of pop, jazz, soul, and Americana. She composes on both piano and guitar.

== Early life ==
Johnson grew up in Cleveland, Ohio. She got her start singing in church.

== Career ==
In 1998, Johnson recorded Remember to Breathe for Elektra, the radio singles were "Sin So Well" (No. 80 on the US Billboard Hot 100 chart) and "Hey Genius". Johnson sought and was eventually granted a release from the label due to creative differences. She then signed with Clive Davis' J Records, but did not complete an album, and after 3 years requested a release.

"Beautiful Disaster", written by Johnson and Matthew Wilder, was recorded and released twice by Kelly Clarkson, on her album "Thankful" in 2003 and as a special live recording on "Breakaway" in 2004.

In 2005, as Rebekah Jordan, Johnson produced and released an EP through her own Tea Party Records. The 6 song EP, titled The Trouble With Fiction included 5 original songs and a signature interpretation of the Stevie Nicks classic, "Dreams". The featured musicians were: Butch Norton Lucinda Williams The Eels, Rufus Wainwright, Tracy Chapman) on drums and percussion, John Ballinger on guitar and clarinet, and Jessica Catron on cello.

In 2006, Butch, John Ballinger, Jessica Catron, and Johnson formed a new band, "Dreaming Ferns". They made a limited edition EP titled You're A Spark, which was only available at live shows.

In 2007, she guest-starred on an episode of Jack's Big Music Show.

In 2009, Johnson relocated to Brooklyn, New York. She began writing with John Legend and Alice Smith, and in 2010 was given the Abe Olman Award by the Songwriters Hall of Fame.

Johnson's Souvenir EP was nominated for an Independent Music Award in 2011.

Johnson was featured as a guest vocalist and songwriter on the 2011 Wax Poetics release Adrian Younge Presents Venice Dawn, on the songs "Midnight Blue", "First Step on the Moon", and "It's Me".

Johnson was also featured as a vocalist and writer on the Rockie Fresh mixtape Driving 88 on the song "No Worries" and on The KickDrums Follow The Leader mixtape on the song "Lights" in 2012.

In 2013, Johnson was invited to perform at The Kennedy Center for the ASCAP Foundation's Contemporary Composer Series.

In 2013 Alice Smith released "She", featuring 6 songs co-written with Johnson and producer Syience : "Be Easy", "Cabaret", "The One", "With You", the title track "She", and "Another Love".

Prince and 3rdeyegirl reinterpreted and recorded "Another Love", for their 2014 album Plectrumelectrum

In Chris Rock's 2014 film Top Five, Johnson is featured in the musical score, singing a cover of Nu Shooz "I Can't Wait".

Johnson has had major acting roles in two films, Barry Levinson's Liberty Heights and in the 2003 gay romantic drama Latter Days where she sings three songs: "More", "Another Beautiful Day" and "Tuesday 3:00am". Johnson also had a supporting role in the HBO film Tyson, playing beauty queen Desiree Washington.

== Discography ==
- Remember to Breathe (1998)
- The Trouble With Fiction (2005)
- You're A Spark (2007)
- Souvenir (2011)
- Asphalt Heart (2015)

== Filmography ==
- Tyson (1995)
- Ruby Jean and Joe (1996)
- As Good as It Gets (1997)
- Liberty Heights (1999)
- Latter Days (2003)
