= Pinups (magazine) =

United States magazine

- Issue No. 5
- Editor: Christopher Schulz
- Categories: Queer Zine
- Frequency: Seasonal
- First issue: April 2007
- Country: United States
- Based in: New York City
- Language: English
- Website: www.pinupsmag.com

Pinups is a triannual artists' publication in the United States playing on the historical centerfold practice of nudie magazines by making the centerfold the sole feature. There are no words—just an exaggeration of the classic centerfold. The magazine exists in book form but can be taken apart and tiled to reveal a 70" x 32" image. Pinups is created by Christopher Schulz and printed in New York City.

== History and evolution ==
In April 2007 the first issue of Pinups was made. It was printed with a Xerox process. In 2008 the printing changed from Xerox to offset. Through the issues, Pinups has evolved from a double-centerfold of one model to incorporating multiple models and numerous images.

In August 2008 Pinups was added to the LGBT@NYPL collection at the New York Public Library.

In October 2008 Pinups was included in Queer Zines, an inclusive historical survey of over 100 publications that examines the continuing transgressive potential of queer and punk zines. Curated by Philip Aarons and AA Bronson, with Alex Gartenfeld.
