= Joe Tabb =

American actor

Joe Tabbanella (most often credited as Joe Tabb) is an American actor best known for his work on U.S. adaptations of Latin American telenovelas, having played Marco Manetti on Desire and Stevens on Saints & Sinners, both broadcast on MyNetworkTV in 2006 and 2007 respectively.

== Filmography ==
=== Films ===
Year	Film	Role	Director	Notes
1996	Electra	Billy Duncan	Julian Grant	Credited as Joe Tab (sic)
1997	My F-ing Job	Tony	Eric Thies	
1998	Highland Park Blues	John	Jens Pilegaard	Direct-to-video release
1998	This Town		John K. Anderson	Short film
1999	Choose Life	Wiseguy #1	Gregory Alosio	
2002	Feedback	Lenny	Teo Konuralp	Credited as Joe Tabbanella
2002	Only Human	Bruce	Kane Picoy	Short film
2003	April's Shower	Jake	Trish Doolan	Credited as Joe Tabbanella
2005	Survival of the Fittest	Benny Graziano	Daria Price	Short film
2007	Fetch	Jimmy	Daniel Bernhardt	Short film
2007	Made in Brooklyn	James	Gregory Alosio, Sharon Angela, and Jeff Mazzola	
2008	What's True	Detective Giani Del Rio	Trish Doolan	Short film
2009	Under New Management	Lilo Conforte	Joe Otting	Credited as Joe Tabbenella (sic)
2012	Matter of Family	Steven	Tibor Takács	Short film
2020	Suicide: Quiet Ideation, Loud Consequences	Self	Jacqui Blue	Documentary. Credited as Joe Tabbanella
2024	It's NOT About the Notebook	Adam	Joe Tabb	Short film

=== Television ===
Year(s)	Title	Role(s)	Notes
1995	Night Stand with Dick Dietrick	Terry	S1E22 "Post Office Show"
1996	Women: Stories of Passion	The Clown	S1E8 "City of Men"
1997	Melrose Place	Tailor	S6E10 "My Little Coma Girl"
2004	NCIS	Ricky "Little Ricky" Napolitano	S2E5 "The Bone Yard". Credited as Joe Tabbanella
2006	The Young and the Restless	Earl - Jabot Employee	Episode #8351
2006	Desire	Marco Manetti	55 episodes
2007	Saints & Sinners	Stevens	25 episodes
