= Latter Days =

2003 film by C. Jay Cox

- Theatrical release poster
- Directed by: C. Jay Cox
- Written by: C. Jay Cox
- Produced by: Jennifer Schaefer; Kirkland Tibbels
- Starring: Steve Sandvoss; Wes Ramsey; Rebekah Johnson; Jacqueline Bisset; Amber Benson; Joseph Gordon-Levitt; Khary Payton
- Cinematography: Carl Bartels
- Edited by: John Keitel
- Music by: Eric Allaman
- Production companies: Funny Boy Films; Davis Entertainment Filmworks
- Distributed by: TLA Releasing
- Release dates: July 10, 2003 (PIGLFF); January 30, 2004 (US)
- Running time: 108 minutes
- Country: United States
- Language: English
- Budget: $850,000
- Box office: $834,685

Latter Days is a 2003 American romantic comedy drama film about the relationship between a Mormon missionary who is in the closet and his openly gay neighbor. The film was written and directed by C. Jay Cox and stars Steve Sandvoss as the missionary, Aaron, and Wes Ramsey as the neighbor, Christian. Joseph Gordon-Levitt appears as Elder Ryder and Rebekah Johnson as Julie Taylor. Mary Kay Place, Khary Payton, Erik Palladino, Amber Benson, and Jacqueline Bisset have supporting roles.

Latter Days premiered at the Philadelphia International Gay & Lesbian Film Festival on July 10, 2003, and was released in various U.S. states over the next 12 months. Later the film was shown at several gay film festivals. It was the first film to portray LGBTQ Mormon characters, and the conflict between the teachings of the Church of Jesus Christ of Latter-day Saints (LDS Church) and same-sex romantic and sexual relationships. Showings in some U.S. states were controversial. Various religious groups demanded that the film be withdrawn from theaters and video stores under boycott threats.

The film was met with mixed reactions from film critics but was popular with most film festival attendees. At the North American box office, Latter Days made about $835,000, which barely covered the production's budget of $850,000. In 2004, freelance writer T. Fabris adapted the film into a novel, which was published by Alyson Publications.

== Plot ==
Elder Aaron Davis, a young Mormon from Pocatello, Idaho, is sent to Los Angeles with three other missionaries to spread the faith. They move into an apartment next to openly gay party boy Christian Markelli and his roommate Julie Taylor, an aspiring singer. Christian and Julie work as servers at Lila's, a trendy restaurant owned by retired actress Lila Montagne.

Egged on by his co-workers after an embarrassing first meeting with the young missionaries, Christian makes a bet that he can seduce one of the Mormons, and soon comes to realize that Aaron, the least experienced missionary, is a closeted gay man. Aaron and Christian become acquainted through several encounters in the apartment complex. When Christian accidentally injures himself, Aaron helps him indoors and cleans his wound. Christian attempts to seduce Aaron, but the hesitant Mormon becomes upset by Christian's remark that sex "doesn't have to mean anything". Aaron accuses him of being shallow and walks out. Worried that Aaron is correct, Christian joins a charity, delivering meals to people with AIDS. He gains new insights through a friendship with one of the beneficiaries. Aaron meets and befriends Lila, whose life partner has died, unaware of her connection to Christian.

Aaron's fellow missionary, Paul Ryder, has a cycling accident. Returning to his apartment, a distraught Aaron encounters Christian, who tries to comfort him with a hug. Both men are overwhelmed by their feelings and end up kissing, failing to notice the return of Aaron's roommates. Aaron is sent home in disgrace, leading Christian to confront Ryder, who is angry that Christian corrupted Aaron for no reason. Christian admits that he initially just wanted to win a bet, but says "it's not about that" anymore. Seeing Christian's distress, Ryder tells him that Aaron's flight has a five-hour layover in Salt Lake City.

Christian finds Aaron standing outside the airport terminal. Christian confesses his love, and despite his misgivings, Aaron admits his own feelings. With all flights canceled due to a snowstorm, Christian and Aaron spend an intimate night in a motel. When Christian awakes, he finds Aaron gone, with Aaron's pocket watch, a family heirloom, accidentally left behind. Christian returns to Los Angeles. In Idaho, Aaron is excommunicated by the church elders, led by his father, who is the stake president. Aaron is rejected by his father and scolded by his mother, who tells him that he must pray for forgiveness. When Aaron suggests that he might be gay, his mother slaps him. Overwhelmed by despair, Aaron attempts suicide. His parents send him to a treatment facility in an attempt to change his sexual orientation.

Christian locates Aaron's home address and phone number. Aaron's mother viciously rebukes Christian before telling him she's lost her son. Believing Aaron is dead, Christian spends the next few days thinking continually about Aaron. Christian travels to the Davis home in Idaho, where he tearfully returns Aaron's watch to his mother. After looking at the watch's inscription, she tries to go after Christian, but he has already left.

Julie writes a song based on Christian's journal entry about the ordeal. Julie shows Christian her video for the song, and he is upset that Julie used his story without his consent. Julie tells Christian that she hoped something good would come from it. In the treatment facility, Aaron hears Julie's song when her video airs on television. The video prompts Aaron to return to Los Angeles in search of Christian. When a stranger answers the door to Christian's apartment, Aaron is heartbroken, thinking that Christian has returned to his party boy ways and moved on. Having nowhere else to go, Aaron makes his way to Lila's restaurant and begins to recount his journey to her. Christian walks into the dining room, and is overjoyed to see Aaron alive. They reconcile and later celebrate Thanksgiving with Christian's co-workers. Lila tells everyone that, no matter what, they will always have, "a place at my table, and a place in my heart".

== Cast ==
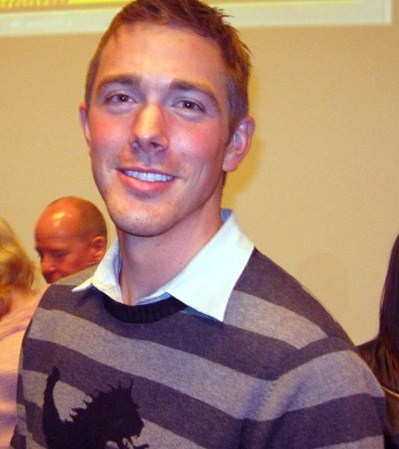
Steve Sandvoss (Elder Aaron Davis in the film)

- Steve Sandvoss as Elder Aaron Davis, a young Latter-day Saint from Pocatello, Idaho, who falls in love with Christian and must choose between his sexuality and his church. The producers auditioned a large number of people before casting Sandvoss, saying he "blew us away."
- Wes Ramsey as Christian William Markelli, an LA party boy aspiring to be an actor, Christian has his ideas of happiness and the meaning of life challenged when he falls for the simple but kind-hearted Aaron. Ramsey said on the DVD Special featurette, "The character of Christian was on so many levels intriguing to me. I was just so excited and feel very blessed to have the opportunity to tell that story through his eyes."
- Rebekah Johnson as Julie Taylor, Christian's roommate who tries to break out into the music world and on the way stop Christian from falling apart.

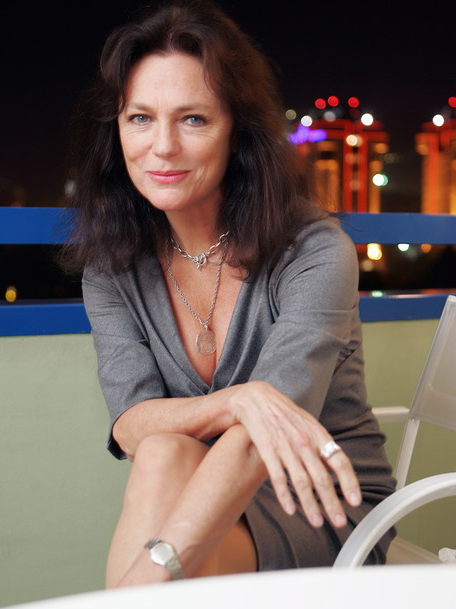
Jacqueline Bisset (Lila Montagne in the film)

- Jacqueline Bisset as Lila Montagne, the owner of Lila's, a restaurant where Christian, Traci, Julie, and Andrew work. Her lover is terminally ill in hospital, but she still finds time to support Christian and Aaron with her witty and sarcastic advice. Bisset herself said, "I like humor, so I just, I really enjoyed doing all the cracks."
- Amber Benson as Traci Levine; Traci has moved from New York to LA to become an actress and works at Lila's to support herself. Traci does not like living in LA, but later admits she did not like New York much either.
- Joseph Gordon-Levitt as Elder Paul Ryder, a prickly, judgmental young missionary assigned as Aaron's partner, Ryder is not enthusiastic about being in LA and even less so about living next door to a gay man. Gordon-Levitt originally auditioned to play Aaron, but his aggressive attitude toward the script but good sense of humor made the producers decide he was a perfect Ryder.

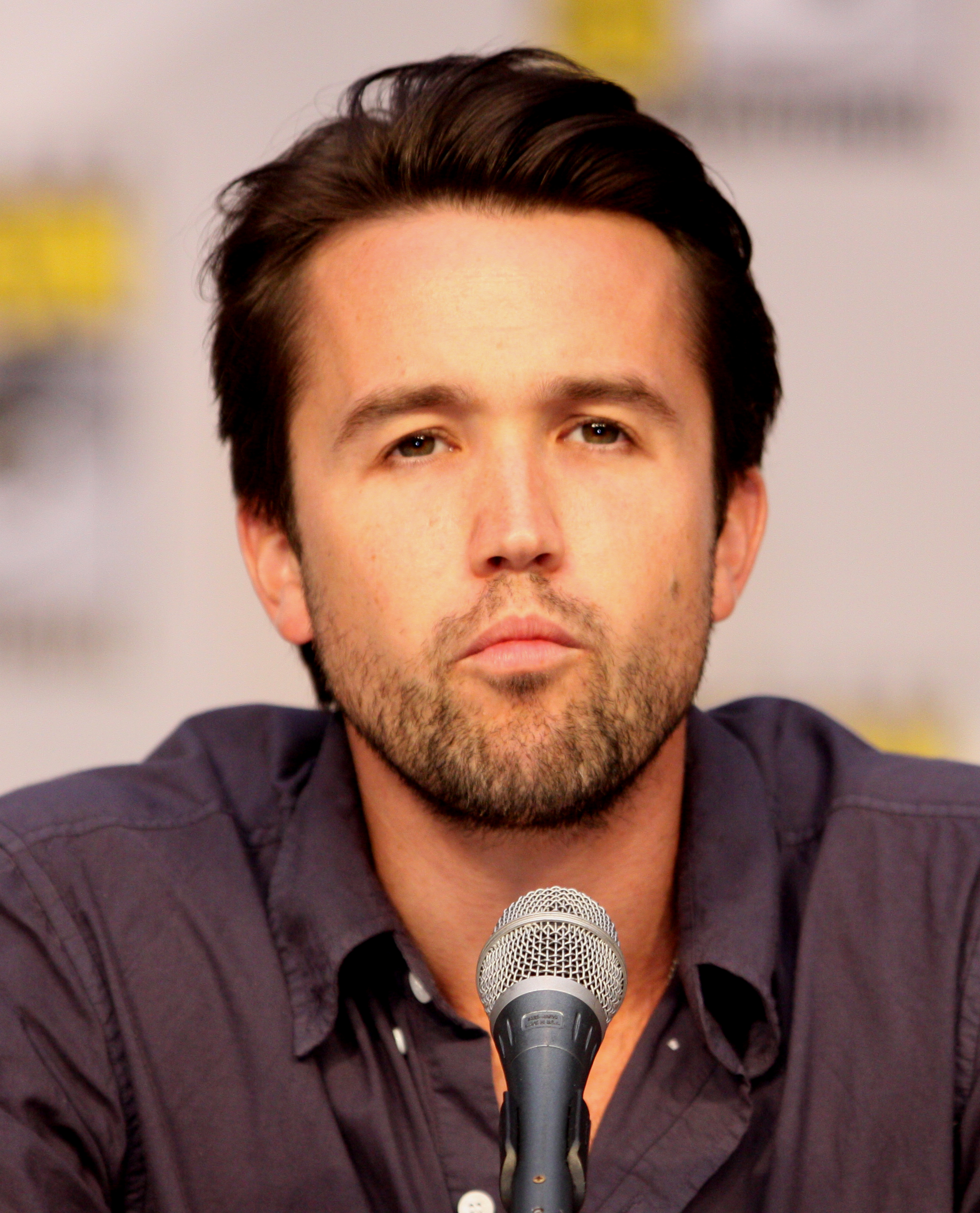
Rob McElhenney portrays Elder Harmon

- Khary Payton as Andrew, an aspiring actor, but one who spends more time at Lila's gossiping and telling racy anecdotes. Andrew has been HIV positive for quite some time, but remains in good health.
- Rob McElhenney as Elder Harmon, the oldest of the LDS missionaries who has been assigned as their leader.
- Dave Power as Elder Gilford, Harmon's missionary partner.
- Erik Palladino as Keith Griffin, a gay man dying of AIDS, drowning in his own bitterness and despair until befriended by Christian. Cox said that Palladino's performance was not how he originally envisioned it, but he could not now imagine a different person playing Keith.
- Mary Kay Place as Sister Gladys Davis, Aaron's deeply religious mother, who, despite showing unconditional love and affection toward Aaron before he leaves for Los Angeles, cannot accept the fact that her son is gay.
- Jim Ortlieb as Elder Farron Davis, Aaron's father, who serves as a Latter-day Saint Stake President in Pocatello, excommunicates Aaron from the church upon learning that he is gay. Farron is portrayed as a distant, evasive individual.
- Linda Pine as Susan Davis, the only Davis who accepts her brother's sexuality. In a deleted scene, she tells Aaron that his being gay has changed nothing between them. She also discovers Aaron's suicide attempt, and in a panic, is able to save him just in time.

== Themes ==
Cox has stated that the film is primarily about a love story between two characters. There is also an exploration of religious attitudes towards homosexuality, and the dilemma of religious LGBTQ people, torn between who they are and what they believe. A non-fiction film with similar themes that has been contrasted with Latter Days is Trembling Before G-d.

Cox has also said that there is a massive irony, both in the film and in real life, that a religion so focused on the family and its importance is ripping families apart through its teaching on homosexuality. In fact, Cox believes one cannot be Mormon and gay. Nevertheless, a major theme of Latter Days is that there is an underlying spirituality in the world that goes beyond the rituals and dogmas of religion.

== Production ==
Latter Days was written and directed by C. Jay Cox after the success of his previous screenplay, Sweet Home Alabama, gave him the financial resources and critical credit to write a more personal love story. Cox based both characters – Christian and Aaron – on himself. He was raised as a Mormon and served a mission before coming out as gay, and had wondered what the two halves of himself would have said to each other if they had ever met. Latter Days was filmed in several locations in Los Angeles in 24 days on an estimated $850,000 budget. After Cox had financed the search for initial backing, funding was acquired from private investors who wanted to see the film made. However producer Kirkland Tibbels still faced several bottlenecks, as financing the whole film remained difficult. It was distributed through TLA Releasing, an independent film distributor, who picked it up through its partnership with production company Funny Boy Films, which specializes in gay-themed media.

Despite coming from a Mormon background, Cox had to research details of the excommunication tribunal, which is held after Aaron is sent back to Idaho. Former Mormons told him about their experiences and provided Cox with "a pretty accurate representation, right down to the folding tables". According to Cox experienced actress Jacqueline Bisset also added valuable suggestions for improvements to the story.

Casting for the two main characters did not focus on their sexuality, but their ability "to show vulnerability". In a behind-the-scenes commentary, Steve Sandvoss explains that he did not want to play his character as a gay character, and Wes Ramsey emphasizes that the love story aspect of the film to him was detached from the character's gender. Due to several nude and kissing scenes, Latter Days was released unrated.

== Release ==
Latter Days premiered at the Philadelphia International Gay and Lesbian Film Festival on July 10, 2003, where it received a standing ovation. When the cast came on stage, they received another standing ovation. The film had a similar reception both at OutFest a week later and at the Palm Springs International Film Festival. The film also screened at the Seattle and Washington film festivals before being released across the United States over the following 12 months. Later, the film was shown at numerous gay film festivals and released internationally, namely in Barcelona and Madrid (where it was also a popular pick) and in Mexico City. Since its initial release, it received nine best film awards, as Cox mentioned in 2005 on a featurette included on the United Kingdom DVD.

The film was banned by Madstone Theaters, an arthouse cinema chain with nine theaters across the country, which claimed it was "not up to [our] artistic quality". The company was pressured with threatened boycotts and protests by conservative groups to withdraw their planned release. At the North American box office, Latter Days made $834,685 from a total of 19 theaters. As of January 2011, the film was the top-grossing film from its distributor, TLA Releasing.

== Reception ==
=== Critical response ===
Critics' reviews have been mixed; on the review aggregator website Rotten Tomatoes, 46% of 48 critics' reviews are positive, with an average score of 5.4/10. Metacritic, which uses a weighted average, assigned the film a score of 45 out of 100, based on 21 critics, indicating "mixed or average" reviews. Frank Scheck, reviewer for The Hollywood Reporter, wrote: "Cox's screenplay, while occasionally lapsing into the sort of clichés endemic to so many gay-themed films, generally treats its unusual subject matter with dignity and complexity." Film critic Roger Ebert gave it two and a half stars out of four, declaring that the script was peopled from the "Stock Characters Store" and "the movie could have been a.) a gay love story, or b.) an attack on the Mormon Church, but is an awkward fit by trying to be c.) both at the same time." Michael Wilmington of the Chicago Tribune commented "this movie is often as kitschy and artificial as ... Sweet Home Alabama" (another film written by Cox).

Other reviewers were more favourable, such as Toronto Sun critic Liz Braun, who said Latter Days was "the most important gay male movie of the past few years." Kevin Thomas of the Los Angeles Times commented: "At once romantic, earthy and socially critical, Latter Days is a dynamic film filled with humor and pathos." Gary Booher, an editor for the LGBTQ Mormon organization Affirmation, said "It was so realistic that it was scary. I felt exposed as the particulars of my experience and of others I know was brazenly spread across the big screen for all to behold."

=== Awards ===
Year	Festival	Award	Category
2003	21. Los Angeles Lesbian and Gay Film Festival	Audience Award	Outstanding First Narrative Feature
2003	9. Philadelphia International Gay & Lesbian Film Festival	Audience Award	Best Feature
2003	13. Washington D.C. Gay & Lesbian Film Festival	Audience Award	Best Feature
2003	8. Seattle Lesbian & Gay Film Festival	Audience Award	Best Narrative Feature
2003	11. ImageOut Filmfestival - Rochester	Audience Award	Best Independent Feature
2003	14. Fresno Reel Pride Gay & Lesbian Film Festival	Audience Award	Best Feature Film
2004	17. Connecticut Gay & Lesbian Film Festival	Audience Award	Best Feature Film
2004	14. Toronto Inside Out Lesbian and Gay Film and Video Festival	Audience Award	Best Feature Film or Video
2004	Lesgaicinemad (Madrid Gay & Lesbian Film Festival)	Audience Award	Best Feature Film
2005	Hong Kong Gay & Lesbian Film Festival	Audience Award	Audience Favorite
2005	Outtakes New Zealand Gay & Lesbian Film Festival	Audience Award	Best Feature

== Soundtrack ==
Eric Allaman scored the soundtrack to the film after shooting wrapped, and composed much of the score himself. Several scenes featuring the rapid passing of time, such as Christian's desperate search for Aaron at Salt Lake City Airport, were scored with techno style beats, and scenes with emotional content were given a more "ambient 'tronica feel". A total of three songs were written by C. Jay Cox for Rebekah Johnson to sing: "More", "Another Beautiful Day", and "Tuesday 3:00 a.m.". Allaman was very impressed with Cox's musical ability, and both men composed more songs as background music.

The official soundtrack album was released on October 26, 2004. Due to contractual reasons, Johnson did not appear on the album, and her character's songs were performed by Nita Whitaker instead.

== Novelization and other releases ==
In 2004, the Latter Days screenplay was adapted into a novel by freelance writer T. Fabris, which was published by Alyson Publications. The book was faithful to the film, but added several extra scenes that explained confusing aspects of the film and gave more about the characters' backgrounds. For example, the reason Ryder tells Christian where to find Aaron is his own broken heart over a girl he fell in love with while on his mission training. The novel also added dialogue that had been cut out of the film: finishing, for example Christian's cry – in the film – of "That's the hand I use to…" with "masturbate with".

In France, Latter Days has been titled La Tentation d'Aaron ("The Temptation of Aaron"), and the DVD given a cover showing Aaron in a nude and suggestive pose. A new trailer was also released, which is considerably more sexual than the original. In Italy, Latter Days is distributed by Fourlab. The film was re-titled Inguaribili Romantici ("Hopeless Romantics"), shown on pay-TV on Sky Show in December 2006, and then released on DVD by Fourlab's gay-themed label "OutLoud!". The film is also available in an Italian-language-dubbed version.

== See also ==
- List of LGBTQ-related films by storyline
- Orgazmo
- The Book of Mormon (musical)
- Portrayals of Mormons in popular media
- Homosexuality and the LDS Church
