= C. Jay Cox =

American film director

- Born: C. Jay Cox; 1962 (age 63–64); Nevada, United States
- Occupations: Film director, screenwriter
- Years active: 1986-present

C. Jay Cox (born 1962 in Nevada) is a screenwriter and director.

== Biography ==
Cox grew up in Eastern Nevada and made his first film when he was eight years old (a two-minute film noir called Vampire Cave). Growing up, he continued writing and creating short films. He graduated with a BA in Journalism from Brigham Young University. He then moved to Los Angeles (where he currently lives) and worked as an actor, performance artist, photographer and other jobs. He began making video shorts, industrial films and documentaries.

After he wrote his screenplay for The Thing in Bob's Garage in 1998, he was given a number of jobs rewriting other screenplays. His own screenplay, Sweet Home Alabama, became a box office hit when the film, starring Reese Witherspoon, was released in 2002. His next film Latter Days, which he wrote, produced and directed, won him several audience awards at film festivals. The title Latter Days refers to the Church of Jesus Christ of Latter-day Saints. His familiarity with the subject matter came from his upbringing as a fifth-generation Mormon. When he moved to Los Angeles he came out as gay. The film is not autobiographical, but it is deeply personal. He directed and produced the 2008 film Kiss the Bride, starring Tori Spelling, and is a screenwriter for the 2009 film New in Town, starring Renée Zellweger and Harry Connick, Jr. He mentioned in a 2004 interview that some of his idols are James L. Brooks, Sydney Pollack and Billy Wilder.

== Filmography ==
Short film

Year	Title	Director	Writer
1996	Get That Girl	Yes	Yes
1998	Reason Thirteen	No	Yes

Feature film

Year	Title	Director	Writer
1998	The Thing in Bob's Garage	No	Yes
2002	Sweet Home Alabama	No	Yes
2003	Latter Days	Yes	Yes
2007	Kiss the Bride	Yes	No
2009	New in Town	No	Yes

Acting credits

- Nightmare Sisters (1987)
- The Offspring (1987)

== Awards ==
- 2003 Outie Award: Audience Award for Outstanding First Narrative Feature, for Latter Days
- 2003 Philadelphia International Gay & Lesbian Film Festival: Audience Award for Best Feature – Gay Male, for Latter Days
- 2004 Toronto Inside Out Lesbian and Gay Film and Video Festival: Audience Award for Best Feature Film or Video, for Latter Days
