= Euan Macdonald =

Canadian/US artist based in Los Angeles (born 1965)

Euan Macdonald (born 1965, Edinburgh, Scotland) is an artist based in Los Angeles. He has exhibited internationally, including La Biennale de Montréal in 2000 and International Biennial of Contemporary Art of Seville in 2005. In 2008, his video, SCLPTR (2005), was included in California Video at the Getty Center, curated by Glenn Phillips.

Macdonald's videos, drawings and sculptures are informed by philosophical, musical, literary and popular references. They often depict everyday scenes while examining landscape, entropy, stillness, noise, and duration. In his essay Responsiveness Testing, Ralph Rugoff, director of the Hayward Gallery, London, writes: "Macdonald quietly unsettles the viewers faith about what exactly is - or is not - happening in the picture he or she is looking at. ... These pockets of uncertainty are enhanced by Macdonald’s deliberately style-less or impersonal approach to making images."

== Works ==
Beginning in the mid-1990s, Macdonald's early videos were single takes that captured specific, everyday events. One of his earliest works, Interval (1997), is a single channel, hand held video of a view from a high-rise building of afternoon traffic passing through two long palm tree shadows on a sunny boulevard in Los Angeles. About Interval, curator Barbara Fischer writes "What this work measures, ultimately, is what eludes the drivers as individuals:" while the drivers are on their own, personal journey, the shadows cast by the palm trees remind us of “the existence of the trees over a certain time, and the changing light caused by the earth’s rotation around the sun."

In 1998, Macdonald shot the video House (everythinghappensatonce), a twenty-five-minute-long take of a dilapidated boat house in mid-fall into the waters of Lake Muskoka in Ontario, Canada. While the subject of the video remains still, movement – from the lake, trees, a boat that speeds by – is occurring all around it. Giorgio Verzotti, curator and art critic, writes that these small events act as a stage for the longer event of the eventual collapse of the house. “This time frame transcends the direct experience of the event, and so the artist allows it to be purely intuited … The intuition ends up approaching the idea of an unpredictable, potentially infinite duration.”

In 2004, Macdonald worked with CN Tower project architect Ned Baldwin to produce The Tower, a public sculpture commission for The Toronto Sculpture Garden.

In 2006, Peter Eleey, currently chief curator at MoMA PS1 invited Macdonald to present his video, Healer (2002), in Times Square as part of The 59th Minute video series. Healer is a video portrait of an elderly, female mystic healer who emerges from orange theater curtains to stand on stage for the duration of the piece.

In 2010, Western Bridge in Seattle, Washington presented A Little Ramble, a survey exhibition of Macdonald's work. This included a commissioned work by the same name, a full scale installation of a large mountain top scene inspired by the Cascade Mountain Range near Seattle as well as "A Little Ramble" by the Swiss writer Robert Walser.

In 2010, while living in China, Macdonald researched and produced work at a western musical instrument factory on the outskirts of Shanghai. Over the course of several weeks Macdonald developed the project 9,000 Pieces (2011), which centered on a factory machine designed to test the endurance of the pianos produced at the factory. First shown in 2011 at Yerba Buena Center for the Arts in San Francisco, 9,000 Pieces consists of two works with the same name: a single channel HD video that frames both the testing machine and a piano as well as an artists book containing photographs of the surrounding factory environment.

While in China, Macdonald was invited by Arrow Factory in Beijing to produce a site-related public artwork. For this project Macdonald produced Take The Dark Out Of The Night Time, an installation of LED architectural lighting on the Arrow Factory rooftop. By "transplanting the visual language of glitzy, brightly colored lights that adorn contemporary architecture" onto a simple, single story building, "an isolated and insignificant corner of the city is mysteriously accentuated and embellished.

== Publications ==
- Euan Macdonald Nine Thousand Pieces, Yerba Buena Center for the Arts, 2011. ISBN 978-0-9826789-3-0
- Euan Macdonald Kimball 1901-, Pitzer Art Galleries, Pitzer College, 2011. ISBN 978-0-9829956-1-7
- Selected Standards, JRP|Ringier, 2008. ISBN 978-3-905770-80-3
- Bingham, Bill and Shevill Mathers, You Are My Sunshine/You Are my Nebula, Contemporary Art Gallery, 2006. ISBN 1-897302-03-7
- Euan Macdonald (Everythinghappensatonce), Verlag für moderne Kunst Nürnberg, 2006. ISBN 978-3-938821-00-8
