= Together (2018 film) =

2018 film by Paul Duddridge

- Directed by: Paul Duddridge
- Written by: Paul Duddridge
- Produced by: Danielle James
- Starring: Peter Bowles; Sylvia Syms; Amanda Barrie; Nina Wadia
- Cinematography: Mikael Levin
- Distributed by: Krindy
- Release date: 12 January 2018
- Running time: 84 minutes
- Country: United Kingdom
- Language: English

Together is a British drama film written and directed by Paul Duddridge. It starred Peter Bowles, Sylvia Syms and Amanda Barrie. It was released on 12 January 2018.

== Cast ==
- Peter Bowles as Philip
- Sylvia Syms as Rosemary
- Nina Wadia as Mrs Justice Reid
- Cathy Tyson as Linda Burns
- Juliet Cowan as Sheila Porter
- Amanda Barrie as Margaret
- Rufus Wright as Dr Ellis
- Carla Mendonça as Rachel
- Dominic Carter as DI Saunders
- Mihai Arsene as Nicolae
- Katie Sheridan as Carol
- Natey Jones as Stuart Marshall
- David Hargreaves as Sidney

== Release ==
The film was released on 12 January 2018.

== Reception ==
At the 2019 International Film Festival, the film was nominated for Best Actor (Peter Bowles) and Best Sound. According to a review by Leslie Felperin in The Guardian, "Writer-director Paul Duddridge heaps on the rotten luck with a certain energetic glee, but too often the performances feel under-directed." The Times said the film had a "riveting and all too credible central idea", and described the film as "uneven".
