= Charlie Brooks =

English actress (born 1981)

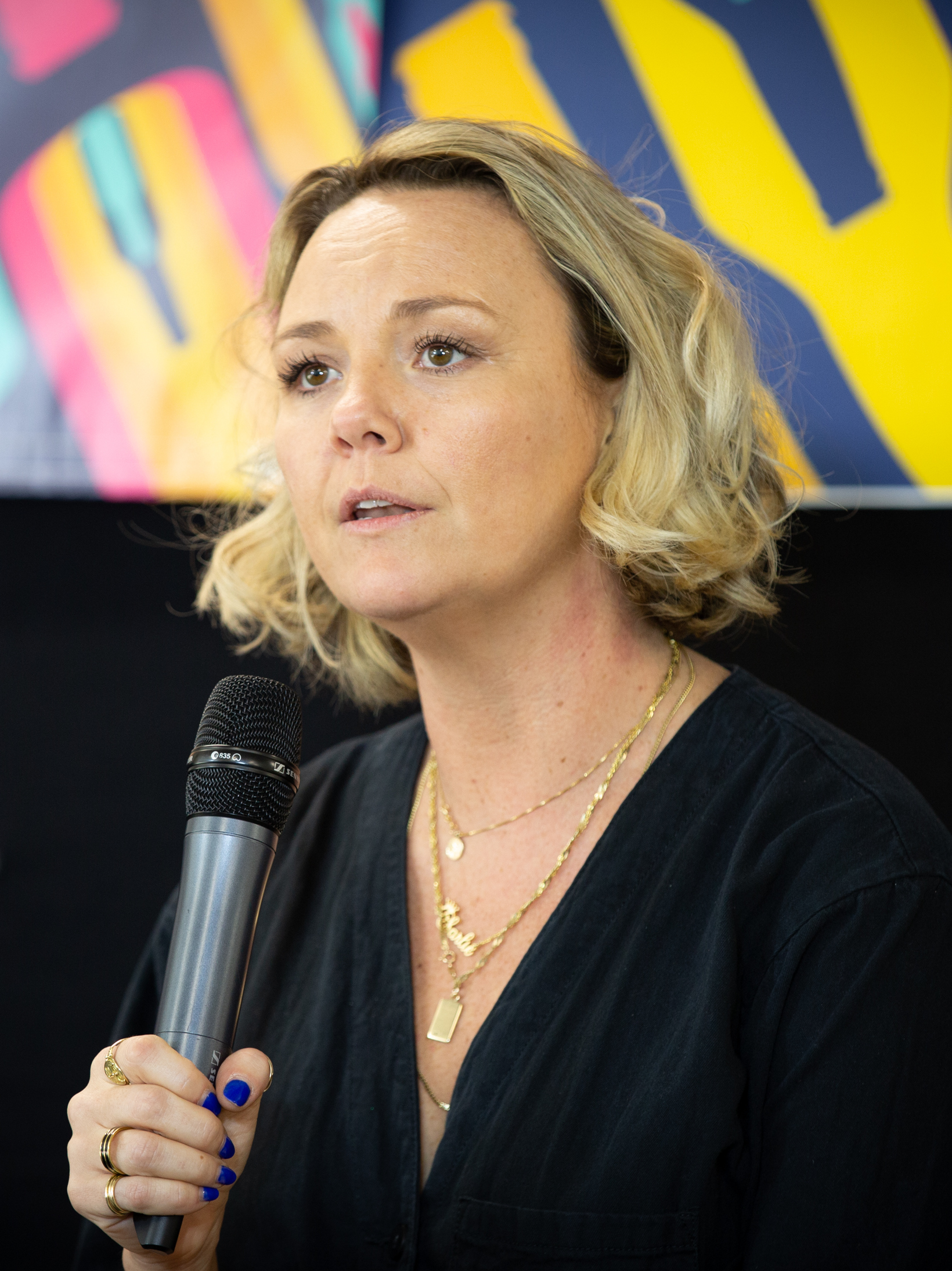
- Brooks attending the Mindful Drinking Festival 2020
- Born: 3 May 1981 (age 45); Ware, Hertfordshire, England
- Occupation: Actress
- Years active: 1995–present
- Known for: Role of Janine Butcher in EastEnders
- Children: 1

Charlene Emma Brooks (born 3 May 1981) is an English actress. She portrayed the role of Janine Butcher in the BBC soap opera EastEnders (1999–2004, 2008–2014, 2021–2022, 2026), and has also performed in British television shows The Bill, Wired and Bleak House. She also portrayed Anna Fallmont in the Network 10 drama Lie With Me.

Brooks has also appeared on several reality television shows, winning the Strictly Come Dancing Christmas Special in 2011 and the twelfth series of I'm a Celebrity...Get Me Out of Here! in 2012. She appeared as a contestant on the seventeenth series of Dancing on Ice in 2025.

== Early life ==
Charlene Emma Brooks was born on 3 May 1981, in Ware, Hertfordshire, England, and moved to Barmouth, Gwynedd when she was a child. Brooks attended Tower House School in Barmouth, and relocated to London to attend Ravenscourt Theatre School, Hammersmith.

== Career ==
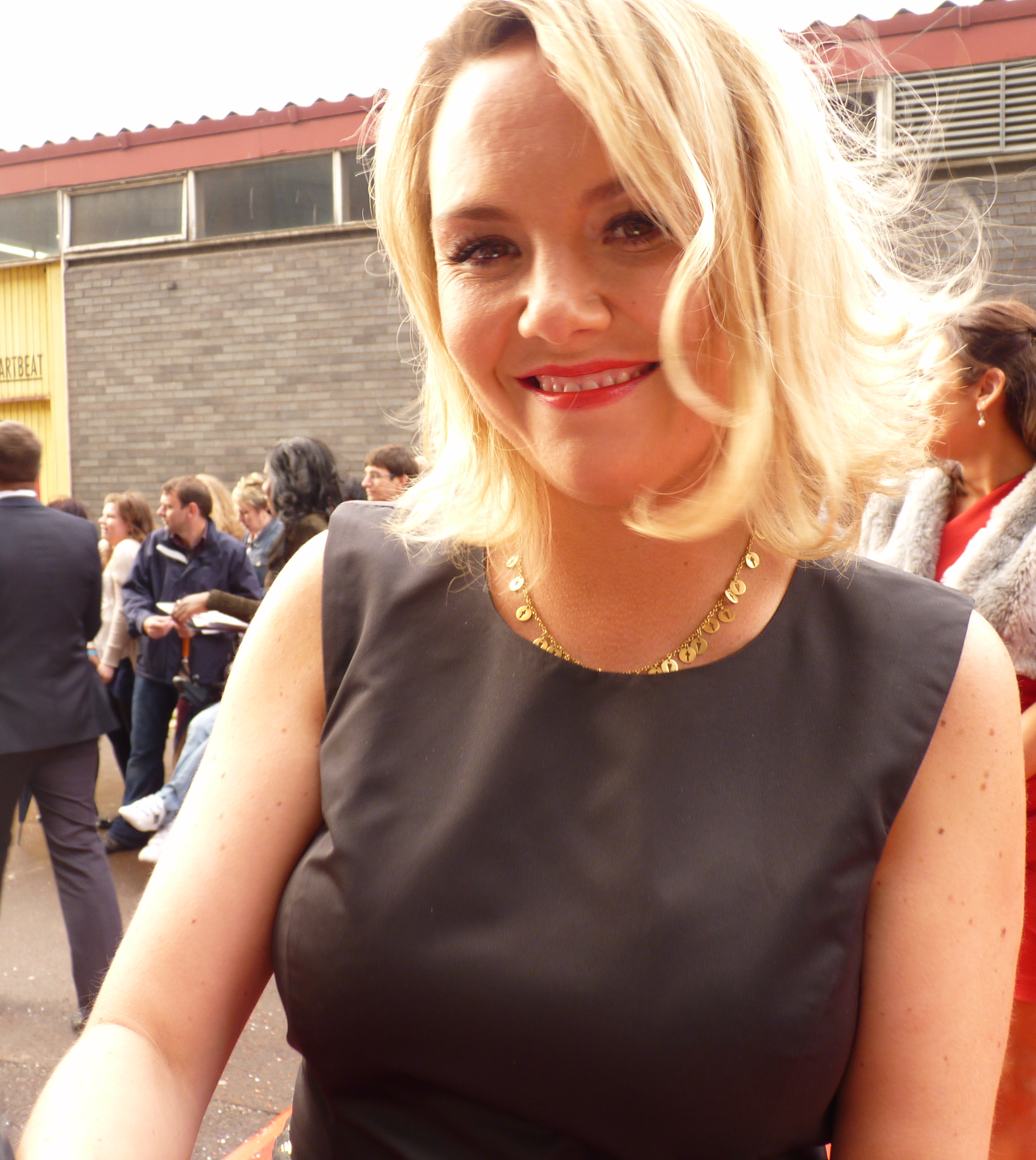
Brooks at The British Soap Awards in 2011

On television, Brooks has appeared in episodes of The Bill, London's Burning, Jonathan Creek and The Demon Headmaster.

Following her departure from EastEnders in 2004, Brooks's first role was in the BBC drama Bleak House as Jenny. Brooks has appeared in commercials and voiceovers in the United Kingdom, Europe and the US.

In 2006, Brooks played Beverley Allitt in a BBC One Docudrama entitled Beverley Allitt: Angel of Death, alongside Ian Kelsey. Producer Cathy Elliot said: "It's a very sensitive issue and of course it's terrible for the parents to have the whole thing brought up. Each time it's brought up it's painful, but a lot of parents realise it's important it's kept in the public domain and that people are aware that things have happened and that not a lot has been done since".

She has guest starred in Robin Hood and Love Soup. In theatre, Brooks, whilst on a break from EastEnders in 2003, appeared in the play Office Games alongside Adam Rickitt. The play was Brooks' West End debut, and described as "a witty and intelligent political commentary". In 2007, she appeared in Our Country's Good at the Liverpool Playhouse.

=== EastEnders ===
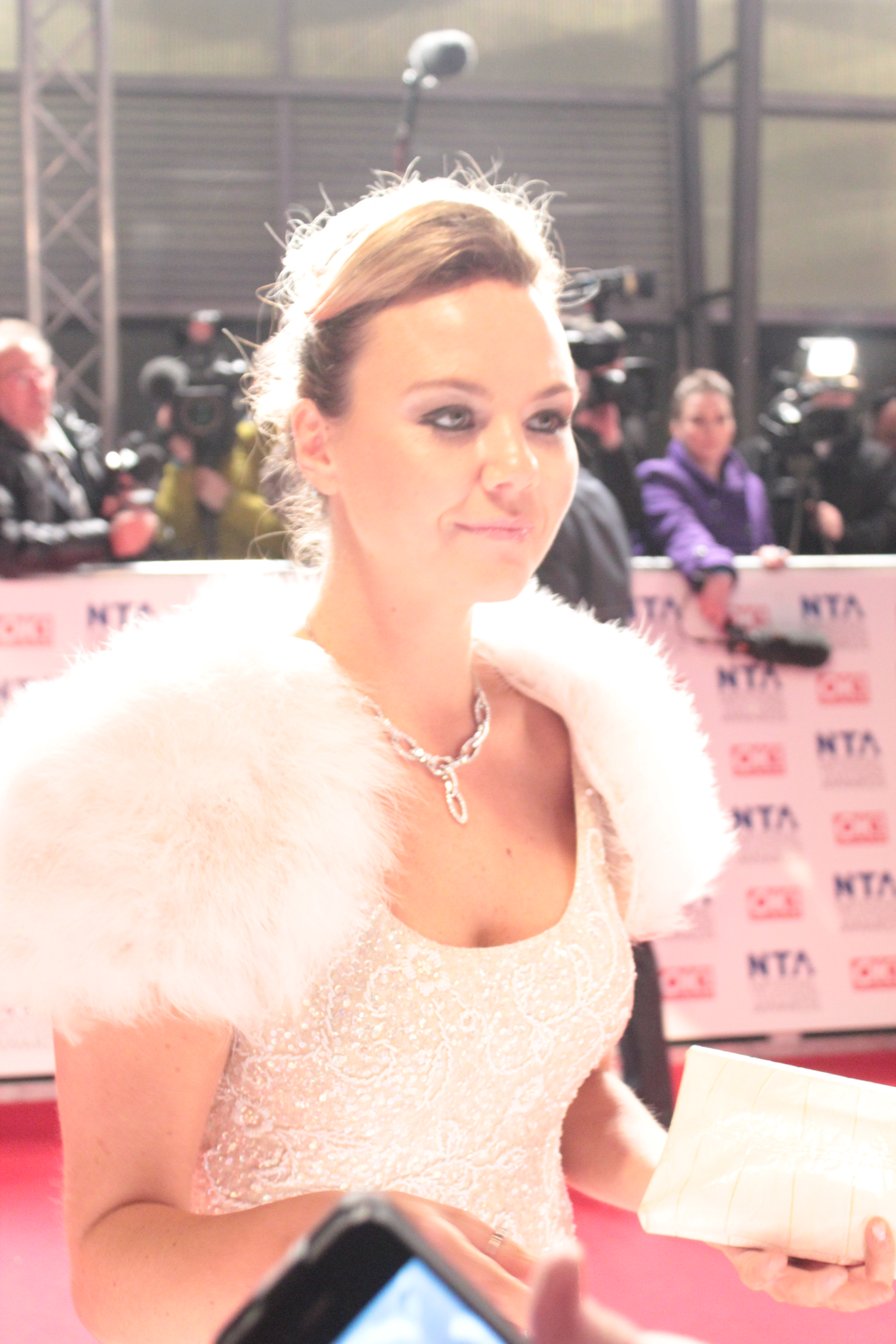
Brooks at the National Television Awards in 2012

When executive producer Matthew Robinson re-introduced the character of Janine Butcher in 1999, after Alexia Demetriou had left the role, Brooks secured the role. Brooks remained in the role until May 2004.

In April 2008, Brooks returned to EastEnders for a guest stint. She was later confirmed to be coming back as a regular character. She said, "I had doubts to begin with, mainly because of Kiki [her daughter], as I know how full-on EastEnders can be, and then there's that stigma about going back to a soap. But I'm so pleased I did, it was the right decision. Especially with what's going on at the moment, I feel really lucky to have a job and I need the security because of Kiki. I was just going to go back for a year, but I had a meeting with the boss last week and we're going to go for another year. So lots more time to get up to much mischief". Executive producer Diederick Santer said, "I couldn't be more pleased that Charlie Brooks is re-joining EastEnders. With her appearances last month, she reminded us what a fine actress she is, and what an intriguing, watchable and engaging character she plays as Janine". She temporarily departed in September 2012, and returned in April 2013 before departing again in March 2014.

In April 2021, it was announced that Brooks had agreed to reprise the role once again for a "huge storyline" and would return later in the year. She made her on-screen return in September 2021. Brooks appeared in her 1,000th episode as Janine on 10 February 2022.

In July 2026, It was announced that Brooks will reprise the role for a guest stint in late 2026.

=== All in a Row ===
In January 2019, it was announced that Alex Oates's play All in a Row, starring Brooks as Tamora, the mother, was going to be produced by Paul Virides Productions at the Southwark Playhouse. The play is based on Oates' ten years of experience caring for severely autistic children and adults, and won the Top Five Play Reading at the Bolton Octagon. The play is about the parents of a profoundly autistic eleven-year-old boy and how they are feeling the night before he is taken to a residential school, when social services feel he needs more support than can be given in their family home.

Criticisms of the play started to emerge when a video trailer for the production was released showing the autistic character, Laurence, portrayed by a puppet. Journalist Frances Ryan criticised the play by calling it a "grotesque step backwards". The National Autistic Society, who initially decided to help the production by providing consultation, reacted to the Twitter furore by releasing a statement saying "while recognising some of the play's strengths, we decided we could not support the play overall due to its portrayal of autism, particularly the use of a puppet to depict the autistic character alone."

Brooks responded by saying: "I understand people's concerns, but I do urge people to come and see the play first before they judge." She also claimed that having a puppet character is essential and that Laurence, the puppet, is very playful. During rehearsals, Brooks visited the Queensmill School for autistic children in Shepherd's Bush, talking to the pupils, their teachers and carers. Brooks concluded by stating: "This is a story that is rarely told. I just hope people will come and see it instead of sitting at home getting angry."

== Other ventures ==
=== Reality television ===
She won I'm a Celebrity...Get Me Out of Here! in 2012, beating campmate Ashley Roberts. Brooks also narrated Botched Up Bodies on Channel 5. In 2025, Brooks appeared as a contestant on the seventeenth series of Dancing on Ice.

=== Fitness DVD ===
Her fitness DVD became the UK's best-selling fitness DVD release, and Brooks was transformed from "podgy Janine to a sexy new mum".

== Filmography ==
Year	Title	Role	Notes
1996	The Demon Headmaster	The Brains	3 episodes
1996	Out of Tune	Carol	Main role; 7 episodes
1997	The Bill	Miriam Olston	Episode: "A Place of Your Own"
1998	Turning Points	Emma	Unknown episodes
1999–2004, 2008–2014, 2021–2022, 2026	EastEnders	Janine Butcher	Series regular; 1,246 episodes
1999	The Bill	Claire Fellows	Episode: "Cold Calling"
1999	Pudding Lane	Janine Butcher	Television film
1999	Jonathan Creek	Trudi	Episode: "The Omega Man"
2000	London's Burning	Lisa	Series 12: Episode 1
2005	The Golden Hour	Cara Wilson	Series 1: Episode 2
2005	Bleak House	Jenny	Miniseries; 5 episodes
2005	Angel of Death: The Beverly Allitt Story	Beverley Allitt	Television film
2006	Take 3 Girls	Patsy	Film
2006	Casualty	Sally Montgomery	Episode: "Sons and Lovers"
2007	Heartbeat	Julie Langley-Smythe	Episode: "Another Little Piece of My Heart"
2007	Robin Hood	Ceris	Episode: "Walkabout"
2008	Love Soup	Denise	Episode: "Human Error"
2008	Wired	Anna	Miniseries; all 3 episodes
2010	EastEnders: Last Tango in Walford	Janine Butcher	DVD release
2011	EastEnders: E20	Janine Butcher	3 episodes
2011	Strictly Come Dancing (Christmas Special)	Herself (participant)	Winner
2012–2013	Celebrity Juice	Herself (participant)	4 episodes
2012	I'm a Celebrity...Get Me Out of Here	Herself (participant)	Winner; series 12
2013–2014	Botched Up Bodies	Narrator	Unknown episodes
2014	Suspects	Tanya	Episode: "Nobody Else: Part 1"
2015	The Dumping Ground	Stephanie Branston	Episode: "Law & Disorder Part One: Party Games"
2016	The Chase: Celebrity Special	Herself (participant)	Didn't appear in the final chase
2018	Moving On	Tina	Episode: "Neighbour"
2020	FOG	Rachel	Short film
2021	Lie With Me	Anna Fallmont	Miniseries; all 4 episodes
2021–2022	Richard Osman's House of Games	Herself	Participant; 10 episodes, including House of Champions
2025	Dancing on Ice	Contestant; series 17	Finished in 6th place
2025	The Hack	Kim Vian	ITVX/Stan 7-part series

== Theatre and radio ==
Year	Title	Role
2003	Office Games	Rose Brown
2004	The Play What I Wrote	Rose
2005–2006	Dixon of Dock Green	Mary Dixon
2006	Dangerous Corner	Betty
2007	Our Country's Good	Dabby Bryant
2013	Dusty Won't Play	Dusty Springfield
2014	Beautiful Thing	Sandra Gangel
2015	A Streetcar Named Desire	Blanche
2017	How the Other Half Loves	Teresa
2018	Monogamy	Sally
2019	All in a Row	Tamora
2022–2023	The Ocean at the End of the Lane	Ursula / Skarthach
2024	Chitty Chitty Bang Bang	Childcatcher
2026	The Curious Incident of the Dog in the Night-Time	Judy

== Awards and nominations ==
Year	Award	Category	Result	Ref
2000	National Television Awards	Most Popular Newcomer	Nominated	
2000	The British Soap Awards	Best Newcomer	Nominated	
2001	Inside Soap Awards	Best Bitch	Won	
2002	Inside Soap Awards	Best Bitch	Nominated	
2003	Inside Soap Awards	Best Bitch	Nominated	
2004	National Television Awards	Most Popular Actress	Nominated	
2004	TV Quick and Choice Awards	Best Soap Actress	Won	
2004	TV Quick and Choice Awards	Best Soap Storyline	Nominated	
2004	The British Soap Awards	Soap Bitch of the Year	Nominated	
2004	The British Soap Awards	Villain of the Year	Won	
2004	Inside Soap Awards	Best Bitch	Won	
2004	Inside Soap Awards	Best Actress	Nominated	
2004	Inside Soap Awards	Best Soap Storyline	Nominated	
2005	The British Soap Awards	Best Exit	Won	
2009	All About Soap Awards	Best Bitch	Won	
2009	Inside Soap Awards	Best Bitch	Won	
2009	End of Year EastEnders Awards	Best Bitch	Won	
2010	All About Soap Awards	Femme Fatale	Won	
2010	All About Soap Awards	Best Soap Love Triangle (Shared with Lacey Turner and Neil McDermott)	Nominated	
2010	Digital Spy Soap Awards	Best Soap Bitch	Won	
2011	The British Soap Awards	Villain of the Year	Nominated	
2011	TV Times Awards	TV's Most Popular Bitch	Won	
2011	All About Soap Awards	Best Celeb Style	Nominated	
2012	TV Choice Awards	Best Soap Actress	Nominated	
2012	Inside Soap Awards	Soap Bitch of the Year	Won	
2012	DS Awards	DS Female Soap Actor	Won	
2012	What's on TV	Soap's Greatest Legend	Nominated	
2013	TV Choice Awards	Best Soap Actress	Nominated	
2013	Inside Soap Awards	Soap Bitch of the Year	Nominated	
2013	DS Awards	Best Female Soap Actor	Nominated	
2014	The British Soap Awards	Villain of the Year	Nominated	
2014	The British Soap Awards	Best Storyline – Hello Stacey, Goodbye Janine	Nominated	
2021	I Talk Telly Awards	Best Soap Performance	Nominated	
2022	Inside Soap Awards	Best Villain	Nominated	
2022	I Talk Telly Awards	Best Soap Partnership (with Danny Dyer)	Nominated	
2022	Digital Spy Awards	OMG Soap Moment of the Year	Won	

Preceded by Dougie Poynter	I'm a Celebrity... Get Me Out Of Here! Winner & Queen of the Jungle; 2012	Succeeded by Kian Egan
