= All in a Row =

Play by Alex Oates

- Original language: English
- Written by: Alex Oates
- Characters: Tamora (mother); Martin (father); Gary (social worker); Laurence (a literal puppet representing an autistic child)
- Subject: Autism spectrum, family drama
- Genre: Drama

Premiere
- Date: 14 February 2019
- Place: Southwark Playhouse
- Official website

All in a Row Live is a play by Alex Oates about a family with an autistic 11-year-old. The play explores the experiences of the parents of a nonspeaking, sometimes physically aggressive, autistic boy and the emotions that they experience on the night before he is taken to a residential school for disabled children.

The play starred Charlie Brooks, Simon Lipkin, Michael Fox, and Hugh Purves, and was produced by Paul Virides Productions at the Southwark Playhouse. An early draft of All in a Row was long-listed for the Bruntwood Prize for Playwriting, and the play was chosen as one of the Bolton Octagon Theatre's Top Five in 2017. It was published by Methuen Drama in 2019.

The play has had a polarizing effect on critics and audiences for its use of a puppet to portray an autistic child.

== Development ==
All in a Row was inspired by Oates' ten years of experience working with autistic children and adults. Oates workshopped the script and puppetry with director Dominic Shaw, and Siân Kidd designed the puppet used for the character of Laurence.

Prior to rehearsal period, the team contacted the National Autistic Society (NAS) for consultation on their portrayal of Autism. NAS arranged for both autistic and non-autistic people to provide advice, and minor changes to the script were made as a result of this feedback. After these changes, NAS released a statement that they could not support the play overall due to its portrayal of autism.

In the development stage, the team decided that the initial design for the Laurence puppet was too stylistically dark to sensitively portray the character, and a more childlike, yet still abstract, design should be explored.

== Characters ==
The play's main characters are:

- Laurence, an autistic 11-year-old boy, who is nonspeaking and sometimes has aggressive meltdowns. Laurence is portrayed by a puppet, operated by puppeteer Hugh Purves.
- Tamora, his mother, who feels overwhelmed trying to keep Laurence safe and prevent him from harming others. Tamora is played by Charlie Brooks.
- Martin, his father. Martin is played by Simon Lipkin.
- Gary, a worker who helps care for Laurence. Gary is played by Michael Fox.

== Plot ==
The play opens with Laurence watching Finding Nemo and begins with an intertwined pair of monologues: Tamora is giving a motivational talk at an all-girls' technology college about her heartbeat-transmitting product, the Heart to Heart, and Martin is describing an incident that occurred in a park in which Laurence attempted to bite a little girl.

The rest of the play is presented in real time over the course of an evening. Somebody has phoned social services and reported that Laurence has bruises. As a result, there has been a social services enquiry resulting in the decision to move Laurence to a residential school where he can be better cared for. A whodunnit, or who-phoned-it, theme runs throughout the play as Martin tries to discover who is responsible for the call that resulted in Laurence's departure.

The support worker, Gary, acts as a conversational go-between for Martin and Tamora as they try to bring themselves to read a social story to Laurence detailing how he will be leaving home. Martin speaks to Gary about his concerns regarding residential schooling, and Tamora confides in Gary her worries and insecurities.

As the evening progresses, Martin and Tamora's relationship degrades, and they begin to argue. This comes to a head when Martin accuses Gary of making the phone call, and Tamora reveals that she was the person who called social services, acknowledging her inability to cope and feeling that Laurence would be better cared for by professionals. A furious argument triggers a meltdown from Laurence, and he bites his mother.

In the aftermath, Martin and Tamora call something of a truce, and they sit down as a family to read the social story and watch the end of Finding Nemo.

== Casting and puppetry ==
The video trailer for All in a Row generated controversy by showing that the autistic child would be portrayed by a puppet.

During casting, autistic and disabled performers were encouraged to apply. Producers stated that two members of the team that they recruited were autistic, but declined to name them in order to respect the requests of those individuals.

The character of Laurence is played by a life-sized, custom-made puppet (operated by a puppeteer), rather than a child actor. Oates told the Newcastle Chronicle and the BBC that his decision to use puppetry was based on multiple reasons, including his admiration for puppetry and the idea that Laurence is a metaphorical puppet of the system, which denies him autonomy over his life. Just like the puppet used to portray him on stage, Laurence is treated like an object that is manipulated by neurotypical people.

Oates also said he thought that using a puppet as a "creative medium" was a more sensitive decision than asking an actor to mimic the condition.

Puppetry director Siân Kidd built the puppet out of natural materials intended to give Laurence a soft quality and chose the colour grey in response to the set design, to make Laurence feel like part of his surroundings.

== Themes ==
Love. The exploration of "love" as a concept is a recurring theme of All in a Row. This is particularly evident in the character of Tamora, named after the Shakespearean mother in Titus Andronicus, as she tries to determine how to best keep her son safe. Her husband, Martin, is portrayed as a perpetual child who is hung up on the notion of love. In addition, the product that Tamora invents was born from her belief that love transforms during parenthood.

Family. The play juxtaposes the movie Finding Nemo with its main story to draw parallels between the characters in each; both stories feature parents who are struggling with letting their children go and doing what is best for them. It also explores pressures and insecurities that can come with parenting a child with special needs, including comparing oneself to other parents and dealing with the guilt of contemplating whether life without their child would be easier.

Disability. Laurence's abilities and needs as an autistic child are a central theme, and the play looks at stereotypes and mistakes that people make around disability and the autism spectrum. At one point, the support worker, who is otherwise a likeable character, makes an ableist suggestion and is reprimanded immediately, suggesting that everyone can get it wrong sometimes. The play also explores whether residential schools for children with disabilities or institutionalization are, in fact, the ideal solution for disabled children, concerns about restraining methods, etc., and the challenge of making an informed decision.

== Reception ==
=== Use of puppetry ===
Much of the feedback for All in a Row focused on the decision to have Laurence represented by a puppet instead of a living actor. While some critics felt that the puppet was an effective representation, criticisms of the play started to emerge when a video trailer for the production was released showing (only) the autistic character portrayed by a puppet. The controversy spawned the Twitter hashtag #puppetgate.

Special education promoter Anna Kennedy was invited to an open rehearsal, which she reviewed, stating that she believed employing a puppet in place of a child was appropriate, as the role would have been too challenging for a child actor. The Reviews Hub also argued that it would have been too hard for a person to play the role of Laurence. Writing for The Guardian, Miriam Gillinson gave the play four stars, calling it lively and truthful and saying that the puppet had a "human feel".

In contrast, WhatsOnStage.com's Jane Kemp said that the puppet added nothing to the production that a living actor couldn't have provided. Writing for The Stage, Fergus Morgan called the presence of a puppet a "wrong-headed decision." Saskia Baron of The Arts Desk gave the play a one-star rating, criticizing the puppet as a "redundant, clumsy distraction."

The National Autistic Society, which helped the production by providing consultation, released a statement on Twitter that, "While recognising some of the play's strengths, we decided we could not support the play overall due to its portrayal of autism, particularly the use of a puppet to depict the autistic character alone."

The artistic director of Southwark Playhouse defended the decision in a statement on Twitter:

[The decision was made] in the interest of child protection: the themes and some dialogue in the play are of an adult nature; also there was a desire to honestly depict the challenges of caring for someone with Laurence's particular behaviour and needs, which meant portraying a certain physicality that would be unsafe for a child performer. We understand that this has been controversial but within the aims of the project, and context of the piece, we support the decision by the writer and creative team on the show to use puppetry as a way to depict the character of Laurence.

— Chris Smyrnios

On press night for All in a Row, February 18, 2019, performer Paul Wady, founder of the Stealth Aspies, Britain's first entirely autistic theatre company, organized a protest outside of the theatre to condemn the use of a puppet to portray an autistic child.

Actress Charlie Brooks, who portrays Tamora in the play, responded to the controversy, saying, "I understand people's concerns, but I do urge people to come and see the play first before they judge."

=== Representation of autism ===
British theatre director Stephen Unwin criticised the play for seeming to suggest that all of the family's problems are Laurence's fault. He wrote, "It's this sense of self-pitying exceptionalism which I think makes All in a Row so misguided and, frankly, so dangerous." In contrast, author and mother to four autistic children Sarah Ziegel praised the play for its "raw" and "honest" depiction of autism.

== Subsequent productions ==
- Theatre Tantarantana, Barcelona, 2024 - The play was produced by inclusive theatre company La Maeutica productions in a Catalan translation. The production used puppetry and received positive reviews by the Catalan press.
