= Katie Sheridan =

British actress

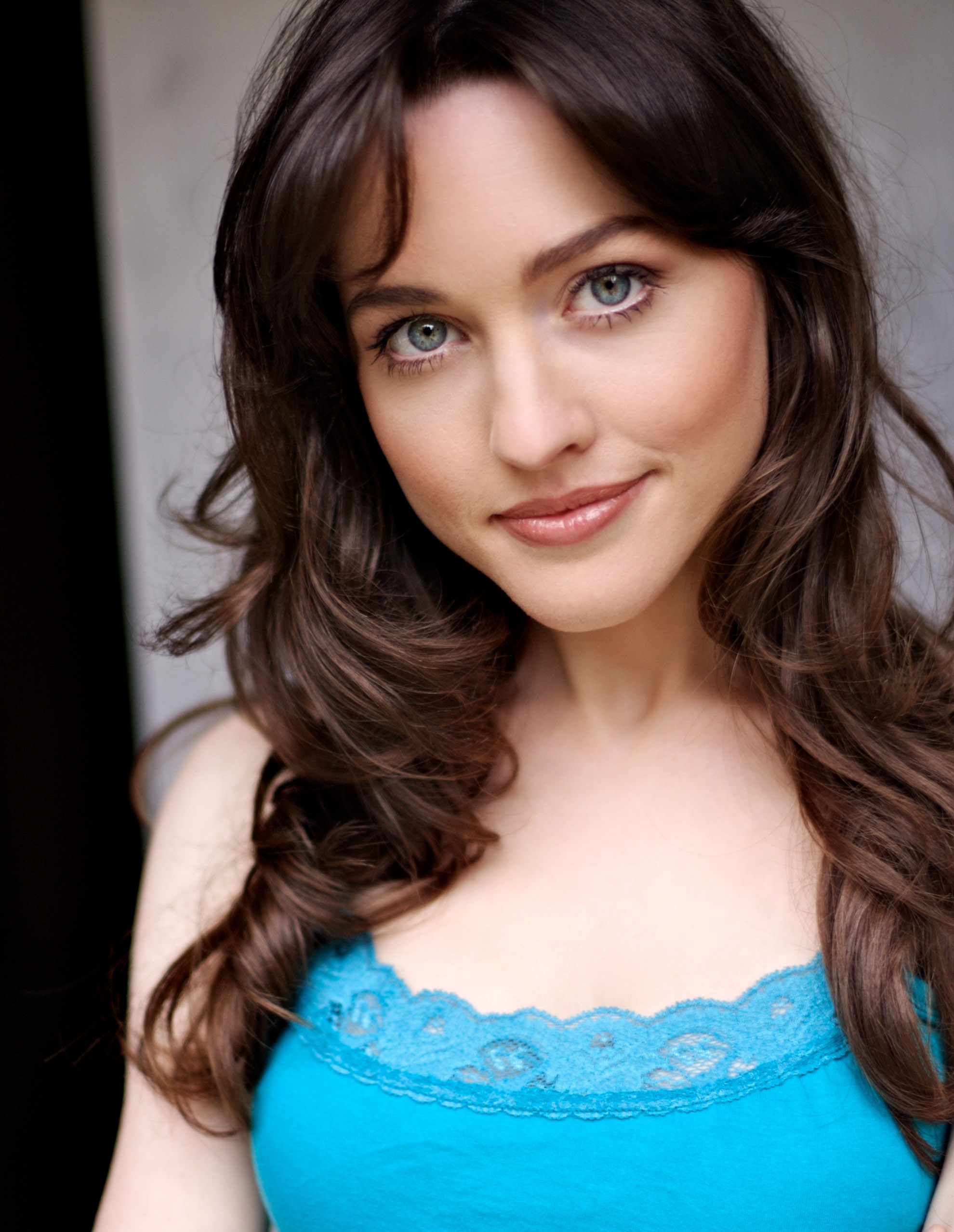
- Sheridan in 2011
- Born: Katie Teresa Sheridan; 29 December 1986 (age 39)
- Occupation: Actress
- Years active: 1998–present

Katie Teresa Sheridan is an English actress. She has appeared in feature films such as Heretiks (2018) and Together (2018), and her television roles include appearances in the BBC series Doctors, Waking the Dead and Love Soup. Sheridan first became known for her role as Sophie Norton in the Nickelodeon comedy series Genie in the House. In 2015 Sheridan created and starred in her own online series, romantic comedy Match Not Found. She was nominated for Best Lead Actor in a web series at the Raindance Film Festival 2016 for this role.

== Personal life ==
Sheridan attended Langleywood School, East Berkshire College and Middlesex University. During an appearance on Reel Geek Girls, she talks about her love for Game of Thrones and Harry Potter.

== Career ==
Katie Sheridan made her first television appearance in ITV's real crime series Cracking the Killer's Code, and appeared in a number of BBC productions including Powers, Waking the Dead, In2minds, Casualty, Love Soup, If...TV Goes Down The Tube and Brief Encounters. She also played young Grace in the feature film Lighthouse Hill.

Sheridan gained a following for her role as Sophie Norton in the Nickelodeon comedy series Genie in the House. The show ran for three seasons, with a total of 78 episodes and was shown in over 100 countries. As of March 2012 Genie in the House was aired in the US on the Starz Kids & Family cable network.

Sheridan has appeared in a number of adverts: for Oral-B toothbrushes in 2015; the Virgin Trains' "Bound for Glory" campaign; the Thorntons Christmas and Easter adverts; the Luton Airport Express commercial in March 2023; for Smart Insurance, as the nonspeaking wife of Paul the handyman in 2016.

Sheridan created, co-wrote and co-produced the online series Match Not Found with British playwright Alex Oates. A romantic comedy, Sheridan plays the luckless in love Kat as the series follows her eventful quest for the right man. She was nominated for Best Lead Actor in a web series at the Raindance Film Festival 2016 for this role, along with the show being screened as part of the festival's Official Selection. Match Not Found was also announced as a finalist in the C21 International Drama Awards for "Best Digital Original Drama", and has had over two million views on YouTube.

Sheridan portrays Sister Margaret in Paul Hyett's horror film Heretiks, which is set in a priory during the 17th century and was filmed on location in Wales. In 2018 Sheridan also played social worker Carol in Together, written and directed by Paul Duddridge, starring Peter Bowles and Sylvia Syms.

Sheridan appears in Melanie Martinez's musical horror fantasy film K-12 as Lorelei, the disguise used by Cry Baby (Martinez) to seduce the villain Leo.

== Filmography ==
Year	Film/TV series	Role	Production
2024	Bogieville	Cathy	Magnificent Films
2022	The Royal Nanny	Princess Rose	Hallmark Channel
2020	Give Them Wings	Jane	Magnificent Films
2019	K-12	Lorelai	Atlantic Records
2018	Heretiks	Sister Margaret	Sterling Pictures Ltd
2018	Together	Carol Turner	Siempre Viva Productions / Colour TV
2018	Rebecca Gold	Rebecca Gold	Web Series
2016	Doctors	Ellie Richards	BBC Television
2015–2020	Match Not Found	Kat	Bytesized Entertainment
2014	The Confusion of Tongues	Harriet	Grand Independent
2014	50 Kisses	Mary	Guerilla Films
2014	Hi-Lo Joe	Cassie	Sonder Films
2013	Which Is Witch	Kelly	I Love Television
2012	Crushing Snails	Sarah	Grand Independent
2006–2010	Genie in the House	Sophie Norton	Nickelodeon
2006	Brief Encounters	Rachel Graham	BBC Television
2006	Love Soup	Teenage Girl	BBC Television
2006	If...(Television Went Down The Tube)	Lizzie	BBC Television
2004	In2Minds	Becky	BBC Television
2004	Waking the Dead	Sarah	BBC Television
2004	Casualty	Becky Eastwood	BBC Television
2004	Powers	Sam Ryan	CBBC Television
2004	Lighthouse Hill	Young Grace	Carnaby Films
2003	Cracking The Killers Code	Linda	Granada Television
