= Paul Duddridge =

British writer and television producer

Paul Duddridge (born 30 November 1966) is a writer, comedy agent, producer and director.

== Biography ==
Duddridge founded the London-based production company "Jones The Film" in 2003. He directed, produced and wrote critically acclaimed television shows "Annually Retentive" for the BBC and "Director's Commentary" for ITV1. Other credit includes "The Keith Barret Show."

Duddridge wrote and fronted award-winning documentary "A Film About Races." He made his feature directing debut in 2016 with Mothers and Daughters.

In 2018, Duddridge's second feature film Together starring Peter Bowles and Sylvia Syms was released. It premiered in the UK and is an official Selection for the 2018 British Film Festival in Australia.

Currently he is Head of Entertainment at digital network TV4 in Los Angeles.

== Political Activity ==
In 2024, Duddridge became the nominating officer for the Party of Women, led by Kellie-Jay Keen-Minshull, giving him overall responsibility for arranging the nomination of candidates and approving the party identity marks used on nomination forms and ballot papers at elections.
