= Directors Commentary =

- Created by: Paul Duddridge
- Written by: Rob Brydon; Paul Duddridge
- Starring: Rob Brydon
- No. of series: 1
- No. of episodes: 7

Production
- Producer: Miles Ross
- Editors: Adrian Conway; Richard Halladey
- Production company: Jones the Company

Original release
- Network: ITV
- Release: January 24, 2004

Directors Commentary is a comedy television series created and written by Paul Duddridge and produced by Miles Ross. It was made by Jones The Film for ITV and broadcast in 2004.

It starred Rob Brydon as Peter de Lane, a fictional director who provided the audio commentary for the DVD releases of shows he had supposedly directed. These commentaries not only provided information on the programmes but also gave a glimpse into de Lane's life.

It ran for 7 episodes, which have all been released on DVD (though omitting all scenes taken from The Duchess of Duke Street).

It uses stock footage of real television programmes, such as Bonanza, Only When I Laugh and Flambards, and de Lane did not appear in person on screen.

The theme song is "The Story of My Life" sung by Michael Holliday
