= Mothers and Daughters (2016 film) =

- Mothers and Daughters
- Directed by: Paul Duddridge; Nigel Levy (co-director)
- Written by: Paige Cameron
- Story by: Paul Duddridge
- Produced by: Danielle James; Amy Williams; Steve King; Ashanti Douglas
- Starring: Susan Sarandon; Christina Ricci; Sharon Stone; Eva Amurri; Courteney Cox; Paul Wesley; Roselyn Sánchez; E. G. Daily; Ashanti; Mira Sorvino; Selma Blair
- Cinematography: Mikael Levin
- Edited by: Vince Filippone; Michael Jablow
- Music by: David Hlebo
- Production company: Siempre Viva Productions
- Distributed by: Screen Media Films
- Release date: May 6, 2016 (United States)
- Running time: 90 minutes
- Country: United States
- Language: English

Mothers and Daughters is a 2016 American independent drama film co-directed by Paul Duddridge and Nigel Levy, scripted by Paige Cameron from a concept by Duddridge, about the lives of different mothers and their children. The film stars an ensemble cast that includes Susan Sarandon, Christina Ricci, Sharon Stone, Eva Amurri, Courteney Cox, Roselyn Sánchez, Paul Wesley, E. G. Daily, Ashanti, Mira Sorvino, and Selma Blair. Principal photography began in July 2015 in Los Angeles. The film was Duddridge's directorial debut.

== Plot ==
The film revolves around the relationships between several mothers and their children. A pregnant photographer captures motherhood on film while re-examining her relationship with her estranged mom.

== Cast ==
- Selma Blair as Rigby
  - Ella Stabile as Young Rigby
- Natalie Burn as Lydia, Rigby's mother
- Eva Amurri as Gayle
- Susan Sarandon as Millie, Gayle's mother
- Alexandra Daniels as Layla
- Mira Sorvino as Georgina, Layla's birth mother
- Sharon Stone as Nina, Layla's adoptive mother
- Courteney Cox as Beth
- Christina Ricci as Rebecca, Beth's daughter
- Paul Wesley as Kevin, Gayle's husband
- Paul Adelstein as Peter, Beth's husband
- David Kloehr as Tony, Beth and Peter's son
- Christopher Backus as Sebastien
- Luke Mitchell as Quinn
- E. G. Daily as Momma Quinn
- Ashanti as Kelly
- Liana Mendoza as Grace
- Stephanie Shamie as Tricia, Layla's old roommate
- Quinton Aaron as Dr. Hamilton
- Isley Reust as Waitress
- Steven Scot Bono as Seamus

== Production ==
On May 8, 2012, Susan Sarandon and her real-life daughter Eva Amurri were cast in the film which was to be directed by Paul Duddridge. Sarandon and Amurri had already worked together in the 2002 comedy The Banger Sisters. On June 4, 2012, Christina Ricci joined the cast, while Danielle James was announced to be producing the film. On July 3, 2012, Sharon Stone was cast, and on September 25, 2014, Paul Wesley joined to play Kevin, a pastry chef and boyfriend of Amurri's character. On July 8, 2015, Courteney Cox joined the cast. Duddridge is making his feature directorial debut on the film working with co-director Nigel Levy. Paige Cameron wrote the script based on Duddridge's concept about the relations between mothers and their children. In July 2015, James was confirmed to be producing the film along with Amy Williams.

=== Filming ===
Principal photography on the film began in July 2015 in Los Angeles.

== Reception ==
Mothers and Daughters received generally negative reviews from critics. On the review aggregator website Rotten Tomatoes, the film holds a rating of 18%, based on 22 reviews, with an average rating of 3.9/10. The website's consensus reads, "Like so many Mothers and Daughters' relationships, its heart is in the right place but this bubble bath of soapy stories slips into oblivion before the credits roll." On Metacritic, the film has a score of 29 out of 100, based on 9 critics, indicating "generally unfavorable reviews".

Frank Scheck of The Hollywood Reporter said that "Between this and Mother's Day, it's enough to spoil the holiday", while Stephanie Merry of The Washington Post gave it 1 out of 4, saying "That's no way to honor your mother". In a review for The New York Times, Neil Genzlinger wrote the screenplay "doesn’t really lay much of a foundation for any of these relationships; instead, we’ve barely registered who’s who before we are plunged into the heart-to-hearts."
