= Match Not Found =

British web series

- Genre: Romantic comedy
- Created by: Alex Oates; Katie Sheridan
- Written by: Katie Sheridan; Alex Oates
- Directed by: Phil Ox
- Starring: Katie Sheridan; Kirsty J Curtis; Connor Mills; Nicholas Clarke; Lilly Driscoll
- Country of origin: United Kingdom
- Original language: English
- No. of episodes: 50

Production
- Executive producers: Alex Oates; Katie Sheridan; Phil Ox
- Production location: London,
- Running time: 2–8 minutes per episode

Original release
- Network: YouTube
- Release: 16 October 2015

Match Not Found is a British romantic comedy web series set entirely on Skype created and written by actress Katie Sheridan and British playwright Alex Oates.

== Format ==
The story is told in vlog-style by Kat with her friends entering the conversation via Skype call and adding to the story.

== Plot ==
This modern romcom follows the story of Kat (Katie Sheridan), who is on an eventful quest for the right man. Feeling fragile after an unexpected breakup, she is now on the rebound with the help of her friends, the vivacious Janna (Kristy J Curtis) and the no nonsense computer programmer Doug (Connor Mills). As the trio hurtle from one dating disaster to the next, it is clear that Kat's friends are no experts in love either.

Over various episodes the characters explore themes of love online and what it is to be single in your twenties in a world moving increasingly on to the internet.

== Characters ==
- Kat (Katie Sheridan) Seasons 1–4
- Doug (Connor Mills) Seasons 1–4.
- Janna (Kirsty J Curtis) Seasons 1–4
- Clark (Nicholas Clarke) Seasons 1–4
- Sarah (Lilly Driscoll) Seasons 1–4
- Tanya (Victoria Alcock) Season 3
- Cordelia (Blanche Anderson) Seasons 2–4
- Olivia (Samantha Baines) Season 2
- Gary (James Baxter) Season 3
- Bill (Page Barrington Bob) Seasons 2–3
- Geoffrey (Ken Boyter) Seasons 2–3
- Lawrence (Jay Brown) Season 3
- Kevin (Davie Fairbanks) Season 2
- William (Jamie Giles) Season 3
- Janet (Gracy Goldman) Season 2
- Matt (Michael Lewis) Season 1
- Benjamin (Oliver Malam) Seasons 2–4
- Kehinde (Adanna Oji) Season 2
- Justin (Laurence Pears) Season 2
- Jack (Simon Pothecary) Seasons 2–4
- Dominic (Lee Ranns) Season 1
- Blake (Jonny Vickers) Seasons 2–3
- Scampi (Scampi) Seasons 3–4

== Reception ==
Match Not Found premiered on YouTube on 16 October 2015. Seasons 1 to 3 were filmed from 2015 to 2017 with the show receiving over two million views on its YouTube channel. In 2020 the cast reunited for a two part special filmed during lockdown.

== Awards and nominations ==
Katie Sheridan was nominated for best lead actor in a web series at the Raindance Film Festival 2016 for her portrayal of the role of Kat, while the show was also screened as part of the Festival's Official Selection.

Match Not Found won Best Web Series and Best Lead Actress for Katie Sheridan at the 2016 UK Offline Web Festival.

Match Not Found was in the official selection for the International Online Web Festival 2016.

Match Not Found was announced as a finalist in the 2016 C21 Drama Awards for Best Digital Original Drama.

The show is a frequent winner of Indie Series Network, web series of the week award.
