= Lytton's Diary =

Television series

- Created by: Peter Bowles; Philip Broadley
- Starring: Peter Bowles; Holly De Jong; Adam Norton; Harriet Keevil
- Country of origin: United Kingdom
- Original language: English
- No. of series: 2
- No. of episodes: 12

Production
- Executive producers: Lloyd Shirley; Chris Burt; Derek Bennett
- Running time: 60 mins

Original release
- Network: ITV
- Release: 30 August 1983 – 12 February 1986

Lytton's Diary is a drama television series made by Thames Television for the ITV network about the life of a newspaper gossip columnist. At its peak, the series attracted viewing figures of 11.93 million.

In 2026, writer Ray Connolly, actress Holly De Jong, floor manager Fizz Waters and senior cameraman Chas Watts shared their memories of the production in the article "Hot Gossip" by Oliver Crocker for the February edition of Best of British magazine.

== Cast ==
Name	Role	Episodes
Peter Bowles	Neville Lytton	12 episodes
Holly De Jong	Dolly	12 episodes
Adam Norton	David Edding	12 episodes
Harriet Keevil	Jenny	12 episodes
Bernard Lloyd	Henry Field	12 episodes
Lewis Fiander	Lawyer	10 episodes
Bernard Archard	Ian the Editor	9 episodes
Anna Nygh	Laura Grey	6 episodes
Jeffrey Segal	Harold	6 episodes

== Episodes ==
=== Storyboard ===
Lytton's Diary (30 August 1983) – director Brian Parker

=== Series One ===
1. Rabid Dingo – Shock Horror (9 January 1985) – director Herbert Wise
2. Daddy's Girls (16 January 1985) – director Peter Sasdy
3. The Lady in the Mask (23 January 1985) – director Herbert Wise
4. Tricks of the Trade (30 January 1985) – director Peter Sasdy
5. The Silly Season (6 February 1985) – director Herbert Wise
6. Come Uppance (13 February 1985) – director Peter Sasdy

=== Series Two ===
1. The Ends and the Means (8 January 1986) – director Derek Bennett
2. Rules of Engagement (15 January 1986) – director Michael Ferguson
3. The Ancien Régime (22 January 1986) – director Derek Bennett
4. The Miracle Man (29 January 1986) – director Michael Ferguson
5. National Hero (5 February 1986) – director Derek Bennett
6. What a Wonderful World (12 February 1986) - director Michael Ferguson

== Theme Tune ==
The theme tune for the series was written by Rick Wakeman which he describes in a YouTube video.
