= Josh Jones (comedian) =

English stand-up comedian (born 1992)

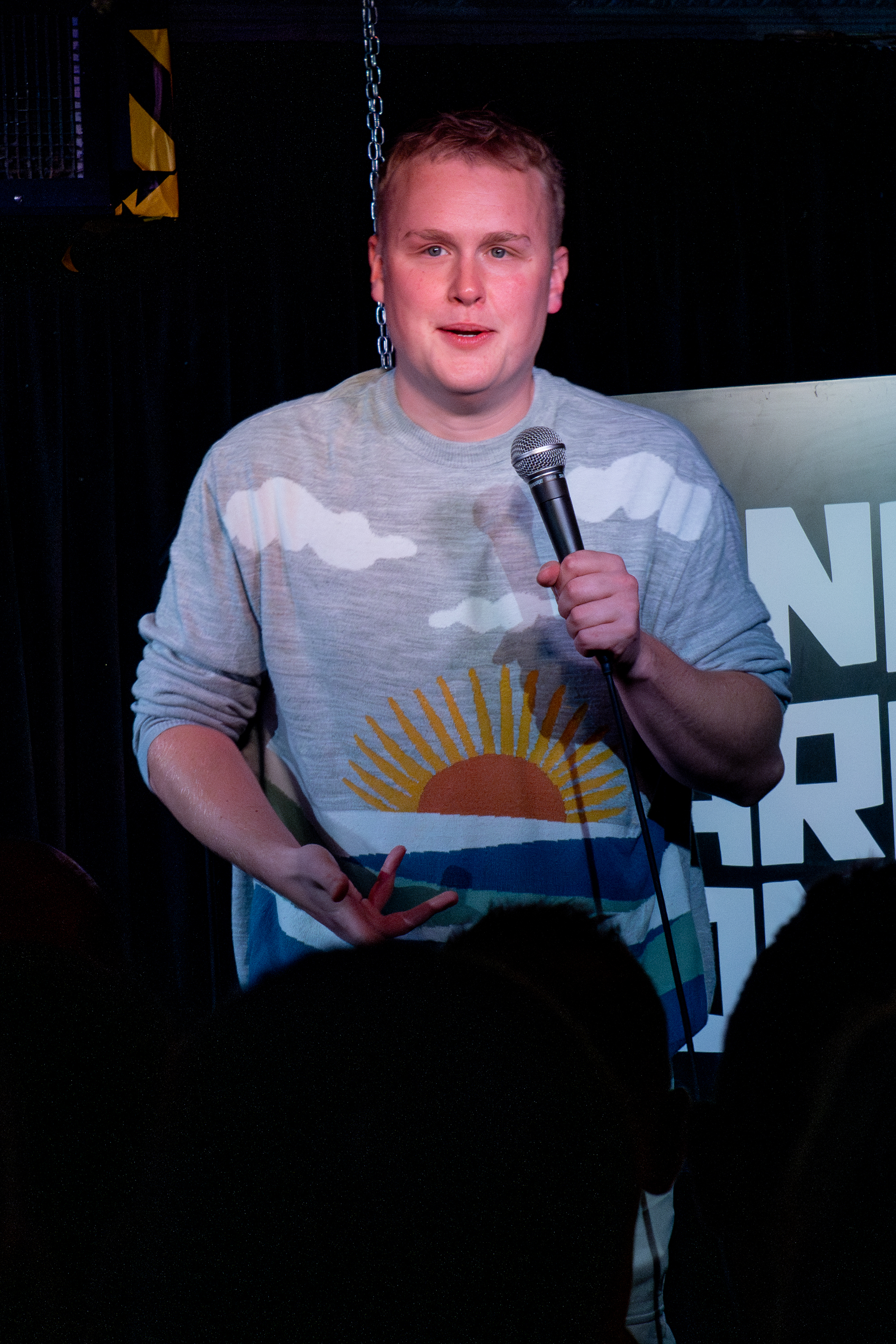
- Jones in 2024
- Born: 9 December 1992 (age 33); Failsworth, Greater Manchester, England
- Education: Salford University

Comedy career
- Medium: Stand-up; television; podcasts
- Genre: Observational comedy
- Subjects: Camp; innuendo

Joshua Jones (born 9 December 1992) is an English stand-up comedian. After beginning his career performing in small venues and working men's clubs, he went on to embark on his own comedy tours: Waste of Space (2022) and Gobsmacked (2023).

Since appearing on Jonathan Ross' Comedy Club in 2020, he has gone on to appear on an array of shows including 8 Out of 10 Cats, CelebAbility and The Stand Up Sketch Show, as well as fronting the BBC Three competition Fast Food Face-Off and the online Channel 4 chat show V.I.Pees. He also co-hosts the podcasts Hard Sell and Chatting with Cherubs. In 2025, Jones appeared as a contestant on the seventeenth series of Dancing on Ice but withdrew after 2 episodes due to injury.

== Life and career ==
Jones was born in Failsworth, Greater Manchester on 9 December 1992. Whilst studying at Salford University, he decided to try stand-up comedy. An out gay man, who came out at the age of 19, Jones' homosexuality is a key part of his comedy act, as he recites his experiences during his performances and is known for his distinctive voice which he said he was "taunted and teased for" as a child, but now "uses it to his advantage".

In 2019, Jones was a finalist for the BBC New Comedy Award, and the following year, he made his television stand-up debut on Jonathan Ross' Comedy Club. Jones appeared on 8 Out of 10 Cats in December 2020. In 2021, he fronted the competition show Fast Food Face-Off for BBC Three in which he pit Kristian Nairn and Gemma Bradley against each other in a competition to find the best takeaway. He also appeared on the panel shows CelebAbility, Rob Beckett's Undeniable, Late Night Mash and Dating No Filter.

In August 2022, Jones embarked on his debut tour Waste of Space at the Edinburgh Fringe Festival, which was described as "no-filter comedy", with [Jones] "gushing out stories and inner feelings in an uncontrollable torrent." The same year, he made guest appearances on 8 Out of 10 Cats Does Countdown, Rhod Gilbert's Growing Pains, The Jonathan Ross Show and The Apprentice: You're Fired!. He also began co-hosting the podcasts Chatting with Cherubs alongside Morgan Rees, and the comedy podcast Hard Sell with Darren Harriott for Dave. In December 2022, he fronted the online chat show V.I.Pees for Channel 4.

In 2023, Jones was a guest panellist on Guessable and Alan Davies: As Yet Untitled, before appearances on Oti Mabuse's Breakfast Show and The Stand Up Sketch Show. In May 2023, he announced his second comedy show Gobsmacked which is set to tour in the autumn of 2023, as well as performing it at that year's Edinburgh Fringe Festival. In 2025, Jones appeared as a contestant on the seventeenth series of Dancing on Ice. He was partnered with Tippy Packard. They were forced to withdraw from the competition prior to week 3 after Jones sustained an ankle injury during training.

== Filmography ==
As himself
Year	Title	Notes	Ref.
2020	Jonathan Ross' Comedy Club	Stand-up comedy	
2020	8 Out of 10 Cats	Guest panellist	
2021	Fast Food Face-Off	Presenter	
2021	CelebAbility	Guest panellist	
2021	Rob Beckett's Undeniable	Guest panellist	
2021	Late Night Mash	Guest panellist	
2021	Dating No Filter	Guest; 4 episodes	
2022	CelebAbility	Guest panellist	
2022	8 Out of 10 Cats Does Countdown	Guest panellist	
2022	Rhod Gilbert's Growing Pains	Guest panellist	
2022	The Jonathan Ross Show	Guest	
2022	The Apprentice: You're Fired!	Guest panellist	
2023	Guessable	Guest panellist	
2023	Alan Davies: As Yet Untitled	Guest panellist	
2023	Oti Mabuse's Breakfast Show	Guest panellist	
2023	CelebAbility	Guest panellist	
2023	The Stand Up Sketch Show	Stand-up comedy	
2024	Battle In The Box	Game Show	
2025	Dancing on Ice	Contestant; series 17	

== Stand-up tours ==
- Waste of Space (2022)
- Gobsmacked (2023)

== Podcasts ==
- Chatting with Cherubs (2022)
- Hard Sell (2022)
