= Lighthouse Hill (film) =

- Directed by: David Fairman
- Written by: Sharon Y. Cobb
- Produced by: David Fairman; Hamish Skeggs
- Cinematography: Tony Imi
- Edited by: Alan Strachan
- Music by: Christopher Gunning
- Release date: 4 May 2004 (Commonwealth Film Festival)
- Running time: 94 minutes
- Country: United Kingdom
- Language: English

Lighthouse Hill is a 2004 British comedy film directed by David Fairman and starring Jason Flemyng, Kirsty Mitchell and Frank Finlay.

== Cast ==
- Jason Flemyng - Charlie Davidson
- Kirsty Mitchell - Grace Angelini
- Frank Finlay - Alfred
- Kulvinder Ghir - Raymonburr
- John Sessions - Mr Reynard
- Katie Sheridan - Young Grace
- Julie T. Wallace - Bunny
- Annabelle Apsion - Honey
- Maureen Lipman - Audrey Davidson
- Samantha Janus - Jennifer
- Samantha Beckinsale - Sally
- Mark Benton - Peter
- David Bowles - Mac
- Ashley Artus - Julian the Hippy
