= Dancing on Ice series 17 =

Seventeenth series of Dancing on Ice

Dancing on Ice
- Series 17
- Presented by: Stephen Mulhern; Holly Willoughby
- Judges: Ashley Banjo; Christopher Dean; Oti Mabuse; Jayne Torvill
- Celebrity winner: Sam Aston
- Professional winner: Molly Lanaghan
- No. of episodes: 9

Release
- Original network: ITV
- Original release: 12 January – 9 March 2025

Series chronology
- ← Previous; Series 16

The seventeenth & final series of Dancing on Ice began airing on ITV on 12 January 2025. During the finale of the sixteenth series, it was announced that Dancing on Ice had been renewed for another series. The series was once again filmed in the purpose-built studio at Bovingdon Airfield, which was set up for the tenth series. Stephen Mulhern and Holly Willoughby returned as the hosts. Christopher Dean, Jayne Torvill, Ashley Banjo and Oti Mabuse returned to the judging panel. The series was won by Coronation Street actor Sam Aston and his partner Molly Lanaghan, with television presenter Michaela Strachan and her partner Mark Hanretty finishing as runners-up.

On 26 March 2025, due to a drop in ratings, ITV announced that the seventeenth series would be the show's last, with the show being shelved and would not return in 2026.

On 4 January 2026, Dancing on Ice was replaced by The Floor from the Sunday night schedule which is currently hosted by Welsh comedian Rob Brydon.

== Professional skaters ==
On 29 October 2024, ITV announced the line-up of professional skaters for the seventeenth series. The skaters returning from the previous series were Andy Buchanan, Annette Dytrt, Brendyn Hatfield, Colin Grafton, Mark Hanretty, Sylvain Longchambon, Tippy Packard, Vanessa Bauer, Vanessa James and Vicky Ogden. Following the announcement, Hanretty and Hatfield confirmed it would be their final series as professionals. The professional skaters who did not return for this series were reigning champion Amani Fancy, who left to focus on other projects, and Simon Proulx-Sénécal. They were replaced by Eric Radford and Molly Lanaghan respectively. Prior to the beginning of the series, it was confirmed that following several reports surrounding the welfare of contestants on Strictly Come Dancing, a 24-hour hotline would be introduced for the celebrities and professionals to contact should they have any concerns whilst competing in Dancing on Ice. On 2 February 2025, it was announced that Vanessa Bauer had been forced to withdraw from the series after suffering a torn ligament and various sprain injuries. As a result, her celebrity partner Chris Taylor was re-partnered with Robin Johnstone for the remainder of the series.

== Couples ==
On 30 September 2024, Ferne McCann was announced as the first celebrity to be participating in the series. Mollie Pearce, Steve Redgrave and Sam Aston were subsequently confirmed later that day respectively. More celebrities continued to be revealed throughout the following days before the line-up was concluded a week later. The pairings began being revealed on 30 October 2024, before concluding a week later on 6 November 2024. Dame Sarah Storey was initially announced to be competing in the series, and was due to be paired with Sylvain Longchambon, however it was announced on 6 December 2024 that Storey had been forced to withdraw from the competition after fracturing her ankle in training. On 26 January 2025, Josh Jones was forced to withdraw from the competition after sustaining an injury to his ankle during training.

Celebrity	Notability	Professional partner	Status
Chelsee Healey	Waterloo Road & Hollyoaks actress	Andy Buchanan	Eliminated 1st on 19 January 2025
Josh Jones	Stand-up comedian	Tippy Packard	Withdrew on 26 January 2025
Ferne McCann	Television personality	Brendyn Hatfield	Eliminated 2nd on 26 January 2025
Steve Redgrave	Olympic rower	Vicky Ogden	Eliminated 3rd on 2 February 2025
Chris Taylor	Love Island contestant	Vanessa Bauer (Weeks 1–3); Robin Johnstone (Weeks 4–5)	Eliminated 4th on 9 February 2025
Charlie Brooks	EastEnders actress	Eric Radford; Brendyn Hatfield (Week 5)	Eliminated 5th on 16 February 2025
Mollie Pearce	The Traitors contestant	Colin Grafton	Eliminated 6th on 23 February 2025
Dan Edgar	The Only Way Is Essex cast member	Vanessa James	Eliminated 7th on 2 March 2025
Anton Ferdinand	Footballer & pundit	Annette Dytrt	Third place on 9 March 2025
Michaela Strachan	Television presenter	Mark Hanretty	Runners-up on 9 March 2025
Sam Aston	Coronation Street actor	Molly Lanaghan	Winners on 9 March 2025

== Scoring chart ==
The highest score each week is indicated in bold green with a dagger (†), while the lowest score each week is indicated in italicized red with a double-dagger (‡).

Colour key:

Winners
Runners-up
Third place
Bottom two or three
Eliminated
Withdrew

Dancing on Ice series 17 - Weekly scores
Couple	Pl.	Week								
Couple	Pl.	1	2	3	4	5	6	7	8	9
Sam & Molly	1st	27.0	—N/a	**32.5**†	29.0	33.0	34.5	37.0	39.5+9.0=48.5	**40.0**† (Note: This couple finished in first place.)
Michaela & Mark	2nd	**30.5**†	—N/a	**32.5**†	34.0	35.5	34.0	36.5	40.0+9.0=**49.0**†	**40.0**† (Note: This couple finished in second place.)
Anton & Annette	3rd	26.0	—N/a	30.0	34.0	34.0 (Note: This couple was in the bottom two or three, but was not eliminated.)	35.5+3=38.5	**40.0**†	38.0+7.0=45.0	**40.0**† (Note: This couple finished in third place.)
Dan & Vanessa J.	4th	—N/a	29.0	31.0	**35.0**†	**38.0**†	38.0+3=**41.0**†	37.5	37.5+6.0=43.5 (Note: This couple was eliminated.)	
Mollie & Colin	5th	—N/a	**29.5**†	30.0	31.0	29.5‡	35.5+3=38.5	35.5‡		
Charlie & Eric	6th	—N/a	26.0	27.0	31.0	32.0	31.5‡			
Chris & Vanessa B./Robin	7th	24.0	—N/a	30.0	28.5	32.0				
Steve & Vicky	8th	—N/a	17.5‡	20.0‡	21.5‡					
Ferne & Brendyn	9th	26.5	—N/a	28.0						
Josh & Tippy	10th	—N/a	20.5	(Note: This couple withdrew from the competition.)						
Chelsee & Andy	11th	22.0‡	—N/a							

== Weekly scores ==
=== Week 1 (12 January) ===
Group performance: "Alive and Kicking" — Simple Minds
Torvill & Dean performance: "Let the Good Times Roll" — Sam Butera & The Witnesses

In a change to the format for this series, there was no skate-off for the first four weeks of competition, instead the couple with the lowest combined judges' score and public vote were eliminated. Only half of the celebrities performed this week.

Couples are listed in the order they performed.

Couple	Judges' scores				Total score	Music	Result
Couple	Banjo	Mabuse	Torvill	Dean	Total score	Music	Result
Sam & Molly	6.5	6.5	7.0	7.0	27.0	"That's Not My Name" — The Ting Tings	Safe
Ferne & Brendyn	6.5	7.0	6.5	6.5	26.5	"Somewhere Only We Know" — Lily Allen	Safe
Chelsee & Andy	5.5	6.0	5.0	5.5	22.0	"Crazy in Love" — Beyoncé, feat. Jay-Z	Eliminated
Anton & Annette	6.5	6.5	6.5	6.5	26.0	"Beggin'" — Måneskin	Safe
Michaela & Mark	7.5	8.0	7.5	7.5	30.5	"Let's Do It, Let's Fall in Love" — Cole Porter	Safe
Chris & Vanessa B.	6.0	6.0	6.0	6.0	24.0	"You Make My Dreams" — Hall & Oates	Safe

=== Week 2 (19 January) ===
Group performances:

- "Praising You" — Rita Ora feat. Fatboy Slim
- "Pompeii" — Bastille (performed by professional skaters)

Guest performance: Disney on Ice

Only half of the celebrities performed this week. Subsequently, the couple from both weeks with the lowest combined judges' score and public vote was eliminated from the competition.

Couples are listed in the order they performed.

Couple	Judges' scores				Total score	Music	Result
Couple	Banjo	Mabuse	Torvill	Dean	Total score	Music	Result
Charlie & Eric	6.5	6.5	6.5	6.5	26.0	"Gimme! Gimme! Gimme!" — Sgt Slick	Safe
Steve & Vicky	4.5	4.0	4.5	4.5	17.5	"Rock the Boat" — The Hues Corporation	Safe
Mollie & Colin	7.0	7.5	7.5	7.5	29.5	"Vampire" — Olivia Rodrigo	Safe
Josh & Tippy	5.5	4.0	5.5	5.5	20.5	"I Don't Feel Like Dancin'" — Scissor Sisters	Safe
Dan & Vanessa J.	7.0	7.0	7.5	7.5	29.0	"Bad Habits" — Ed Sheeran	Safe

=== Week 3 (26 January) ===
Theme: Movies
Group performance: "One Short Day" — from Wicked (performed by professional skaters)

Prior to the live show, it was announced that Josh Jones and Tippy Packard had been forced to withdraw from competition after Jones sustained an ankle injury during training.

Couples are listed in the order they performed.

Couple	Judges' scores				Total score	Music	Film	Result
Couple	Banjo	Mabuse	Torvill	Dean	Total score	Music	Film	Result
Dan & Vanessa J.	7.5	7.5	8.0	8.0	31.0	"James Bond Theme"	Dr. No	Safe
Ferne & Brendyn	7.0	7.0	7.0	7.0	28.0	"September"	Trolls	Eliminated
Michaela & Mark	8.0	8.0	8.5	8.0	32.5	"The Sound of Music"	The Sound of Music	Safe
Chris & Vanessa B.	7.5	7.5	7.5	7.5	30.0	"I'm Just Ken"	Barbie	Safe
Sam & Molly	8.5	8.0	8.0	8.0	32.5	"I Wan'na Be Like You (The Monkey Song)"	The Jungle Book	Safe
Steve & Vicky	5.0	4.5	5.5	5.0	20.0	"Love Theme from The Godfather"	The Godfather	Safe
Anton & Annette	7.5	7.5	7.5	7.5	30.0	"Like a Prayer"	Deadpool & Wolverine	Safe
Charlie & Eric	6.5	6.5	7.0	7.0	27.0	"Unchained Melody"	Ghost	Safe
Mollie & Colin	7.5	7.5	7.5	7.5	30.0	"Beauty and the Beast"	Beauty and the Beast	Safe

=== Week 4 (2 February) ===
Theme: Personal
Group performance: "You Are the Reason" — Calum Scott (performed by professional skaters)

Prior to the live show, it was announced that Vanessa Bauer had been forced to withdraw from the competition due to injury. Chris Taylor was therefore re-partnered with Robin Johnstone for the remainder of the series.

Couples are listed in the order they performed.

Couple	Judges' scores				Total score	Music	Result
Couple	Banjo	Mabuse	Torvill	Dean	Total score	Music	Result
Steve & Vicky	5.5	5.0	5.5	5.5	21.5	"It's My Life" — Bon Jovi	Eliminated
Dan & Vanessa J.	8.5	8.5	9.0	9.0	35.0	"Blue Moon" — Frank Sinatra	Safe
Mollie & Colin	8.0	8.0	7.5	7.5	31.0	"This Is Me (The Reimagined Remix)" — Keala Settle, Kesha & Missy Elliott	Safe
Sam & Molly	7.0	7.0	7.5	7.5	29.0	"Baba O'Riley" — The Who	Safe
Charlie & Eric	7.5	8.0	8.0	7.5	31.0	"Someone like You" — Adele	Safe
Anton & Annette	8.5	8.5	8.5	8.5	34.0	"She's Royal" — Tarrus Riley	Safe
Chris & Robin	7.0	7.5	7.0	7.0	28.5	"Pokémon Theme" — Jason Paige	Safe
Michaela & Mark	8.5	8.5	8.5	8.5	34.0	"Waka Waka (This Time for Africa)" — Shakira	Safe

=== Week 5 (9 February) ===
Guest performance: Lilah Fear & Lewis Gibson — "Le Freak" — "Chic
Group performance: "Stargazing" — Myles Smith (performed by professional skaters)

Due to sustaining an injury during training, Eric Radford was unable to skate with Charlie Brooks this week. Therefore, she performed with Brendyn Hatfield instead.

The skate-off returned this week, however in a further change to the format, couples were no longer required to perform a different "Save Me skate" routine, instead repeating their first performance.

Couples are listed in the order they performed.

Couple	Judges' scores				Total score	Music	Result
Couple	Banjo	Mabuse	Torvill	Dean	Total score	Music	Result
Anton & Annette	8.5	8.5	8.5	8.5	34.0	"Livin' la Vida Loca" — Ricky Martin	Bottom two
Chris & Robin	8.0	8.0	8.0	8.0	32.0	"Golden Hour" — Jvke	Eliminated
Mollie & Colin	7.5	7.0	7.5	7.5	29.5	"Hot to Go!" — Chappell Roan	Safe
Michaela & Mark	9.0	9.0	9.0	8.5	35.5	"Chasing Cars" — Snow Patrol	Safe
Charlie & Brendyn	8.0	8.0	8.0	8.0	32.0	"Common People" — Pulp	Safe
Sam & Molly	8.0	7.5	8.5	9.0	33.0	"Die with a Smile" — Lady Gaga & Bruno Mars	Safe
Dan & Vanessa J.	9.5	9.5	9.5	9.5	38.0	"Lionheart (Fearless)" — Joel Corry & Tom Grennan	Safe

Judges' votes to save

- Banjo: Anton & Annette
- Mabuse: Anton & Annette
- Dean: Anton & Annette
- Torvill: Did not vote, but would have voted to save Anton & Annette

=== Week 6 (16 February) ===
Theme: 80's
Guest performance: Carol Decker — "China in Your Hand"

After their individual performances, the couples were divided into two teams for a group performance. The couples on the winning team, as determined by the judges, had an additional three points added to their final scores.

Team challenge: "Two Tribes" — Frankie Goes to Hollywood

- Team Dan (Dan & Vanessa J.; Anton & Annette; and Mollie & Colin)
- Team Michaela (Michaela & Mark; Charlie & Eric; and Sam & Molly)

Couples are listed in the order they performed.

Couple	Judges' scores				Total score	Team skate	Final score	Music	Result
Couple	Banjo	Mabuse	Torvill	Dean	Total score	Team skate	Final score	Music	Result
Michaela & Mark	8.5	8.5	8.5	8.5	34.0	Lost	34.0	"Venus" — Bananarama	Safe
Charlie & Eric	8.0	7.5	8.0	8.0	31.5	Lost	31.5	"Never Too Much" — Luther Vandross	Eliminated
Dan & Vanessa J.	9.5	9.5	9.5	9.5	38.0	Won	41.0	"Faith" — George Michael	Safe
Mollie & Colin	9.0	9.0	8.5	9.0	35.5	Won	38.5	"Time After Time" — Cyndi Lauper	Safe
Anton & Annette	9.0	8.5	9.0	9.0	35.5	Won	38.5	"You Spin Me Round (Like a Record)" — Dead or Alive	Bottom two
Sam & Molly	9.0	8.5	8.5	8.5	34.5	Lost	34.5	"Push It" — Salt-N-Pepa	Safe

Judges' votes to save

- Banjo: Anton & Annette
- Mabuse: Anton & Annette
- Torvill: Anton & Annette
- Dean: Did not vote, but would have voted to save Anton & Annette

=== Week 7 (23 February) ===
Theme: Musicals
Guest performances:

- Michael Ball & Alfie Boe— "Tonight" (from West Side Story)
- Amber Davies — "All That Jazz" (from Chicago)
- The cast of Moulin Rouge! — "Diamonds Are Forever", "Diamonds Are a Girl's Best Friend", "Material Girl" & "Single Ladies (Put a Ring on It)"

Couples are listed in the order they performed.

Couple	Judges' scores				Total score	Music	Musical	Result
Couple	Banjo	Mabuse	Torvill	Dean	Total score	Music	Musical	Result
Mollie & Colin	9.0	9.0	9.0	8.5	35.5	"Mamma Mia"	Mamma Mia!	Eliminated
Sam & Molly	9.0	9.5	9.0	9.5	37.0	"I'd Do Anything"	Oliver!	Safe
Michaela & Mark	9.0	9.0	9.5	9.0	36.5	"Cabaret"	Cabaret	Safe
Dan & Vanessa J.	9.5	9.0	9.5	9.5	37.5	"Oklahoma"	Oklahoma!	Bottom two
Anton & Annette	10.0	10.0	10.0	10.0	40.0	"Bring Him Home"	Les Misérables	Safe

Judges' votes to save

- Banjo: Dan & Vanessa J.
- Mabuse: Mollie & Colin
- Dean: Dan & Vanessa J.
- Torvill: Dan & Vanessa J.

=== Week 8: Semi-final (2 March) ===
Theme: Solo skate
Group performance: "Left to My Own Devices" — Pet Shop Boys (performed by professional skaters)
Guest performances: "In My Arms" - Kylie Minogue

- Edward Appleby — "Blinding Lights" — The Weeknd
- Diversity — "Cry Me a River" — Justin Timberlake

For this week's judges' challenge, each celebrity was required to perform a 30-second solo skate within their routine during which they could incorporate five required elements for up to an additional ten points including; a spin, a jump, a reverse lunge, a spiral and a unique move, with two extra points on offer for each of the elements completed.

Couples are listed in the order they performed.

Couple	Judges' scores				Total score	Solo challenge	Final score	Music	Result
Couple	Banjo	Mabuse	Torvill	Dean	Total score	Solo challenge	Final score	Music	Result
Sam & Molly	10.0	10.0	9.5	10.0	39.5	9.0	48.5	"I Want to Break Free" — Queen	Safe
Dan & Vanessa J.	9.5	10.0	9.0	9.0	37.5	6.0	43.5	"Dancing on My Own" — Calum Scott	Eliminated
Anton & Annette	9.5	9.5	9.5	9.5	38.0	7.0	45.0	"Ridin' Solo" — Jason Derulo	Bottom two
Michaela & Mark	10.0	10.0	10.0	10.0	40.0	9.0	49.0	"All by Myself" — Celine Dion	Safe

Judges' votes to save

- Banjo: Anton & Annette
- Mabuse: Anton & Annette
- Torvill: Anton & Annette
- Dean: Did not vote, but would have voted to save Anton & Annette

=== Week 9: Final (9 March) ===
Theme: Showcase; Boléro
Group performances:

- "Adrenaline Rush" — Sigma feat. Morgan
- "Apt." — Rosé & Bruno Mars (performed by eliminated contestants)

Torvill & Dean performance: "Lifted" — Lighthouse Family

Couples are listed in the order they performed.

Couple	Judges' scores				Total score	Music	Result
Couple	Banjo	Mabuse	Torvill	Dean	Total score	Music	Result
Anton & Annette	10.0	10.0	10.0	10.0	40.0	"Let's Go Crazy" — Prince & The Revolution	Third place
Sam & Molly	10.0	10.0	10.0	10.0	40.0	"The Pink Panther Theme" — Henry Mancini	Winners
Michaela & Mark	10.0	10.0	10.0	10.0	40.0	"Don't Rain on My Parade" — Barbra Streisand	Runners-up

== Ratings ==
Official ratings are taken from BARB. Viewing figures are from 7 day data.

Episode	Date	Total viewers (millions) on ITVX as of Nov 2026	Total weekly ranking
Live show 1	12 January	3.31	37
Live show 2	19 January	3.25	37
Live show 3	26 January	N/A (<2.99)	Outside top 50
Live show 4	2 February	2.84	47
Live show 5	9 February	N/A (<2.78)	Outside top 50
Live show 6	16 February	2.87	41
Live show 7	23 February	2.83	44
Live show 8	2 March	2.95	36
Live show 9	9 March	3.06	34
