= Anna Kennedy =

Special education campaigner

- Born: 12 March 1960 (age 66); Middlesbrough, England
- Occupation: Disability/neurodiversity campaigner.
- Website: https://www.annakennedyonline.com/

Anna Kennedy (born 12 March 1960) is a British disability/neurodiversity campaigner who has worked to provide improved education and other services and support for children and adults described as being on the autism spectrum as well as other neurodivergent conditions. In pursuing these activities she has (among other things) helped establish two schools, a college, a respite home and a website with over 100,000 international followers.

Kennedy was given an OBE (Royal Reward for Inspirational Mother) Award by Queen Elizabeth II at Buckingham Palace in 2012 for her services. Kennedy is the special education correspondent of the psychology website Psychreg. She speaks fluent Italian.

== Early life ==
Born in Middlesbrough to Maria and Antonino Sammarone, she studied at Sacred Heart School Middlesbrough. Before leaving for Italy, she had set up a dance school, which was owned and run by her for a number of years. She married Sean Kennedy, who had been given a diagnosis of Asperger syndrome. Sean is a practicing barrister, and is also from Middlesbrough from a working class Irish Catholic background. They have two sons; when the boys reached school age, Anna Kennedy discovered that they are autistic.

It was difficult for Anna and Sean to find a suitable education for their eight-year-old; they started a support group in their home, which grew rapidly and was joined by 275 families. They remortgaged their house to raise funds to open a school with special educational needs for their children.

== Hillingdon Manor School ==
Anna and her husband prepared a feasibility report to convert a local school, which was apparently due to be demolished, into a school for autistic children and young people. Volunteers were also coming out to help them, including carpenters, electricians and painters. Anna also approached the probation service for volunteers to come and help. Hillingdon Manor School for autistic children opened in 1999, with only 19 pupils. Initially, this school had places for 14 children, later increased to 63 places by 2002. The funding for places by the local authority was based upon the condition that parents of autistic children select this school as a suitable place for their special children's needs. Anna Kennedy stood down from all school management in May 2013 leaving this to others. She now focuses exclusively on her charitable work.

== Online presence ==
She has more than 100,000 online followers through her website including the parents of autistic children, professionals, media and those who are concerned with autism. She is constantly creating awareness about autism and making efforts to raise funds to continue their work.

Kennedy is committed to inclusion and empowerment. Her charity offers free online legal seminars using fully qualified, practising lawyers. These workshops are generally applicable autism and all disabilities and their objective is to make complicated appearing legal terms look simple.

== Training ==
Kennedy also provides training for the National Society for the Prevention of Cruelty to Children and Childline with regards to the disability bullying issue and create awareness about autism all over the UK.

== Not Stupid ==
In 2009, Kennedy wrote a book titled Not Stupid, which was about the struggle she had to set up the school for her children. The book is based on the story of a mother who fights to rescue the lives of her children from autism.

== DVD ==
In 2011 she released a fitness DVD, Step in The Right Direction. It has been launched in Birmingham at the British Institute of Learning Disabilities Conference.

== Daisy Chain ==
Kennedy accepted a role as patron in a bid to boost the profile of a charity called the Daisy Chain Charity that helps support families with autistic children. She has visited Calf Fallow farm, the home of Daisy Chain, to meet staff and see for herself the work being done there.

"This is really very good, I am very impressed", she said afterwards. "The space available here is fantastic and just what is needed as we move forward and develop the services Daisy Chain provides. I am really excited about coming on board at this stage of development."

== Autism Got Talent ==
Autism Got Talent was the first talent show organised by Kennedy, on 12 May 2012. In this show, autistic children and adults performed on the stage at London's Mermaid Theatre. A performance from James Hobley, an autistic dancer, was also included in this show who had appeared on Britain's Got Talent.

== Other activities ==
During Autism Awareness Month, April 2013, the Anti-Bullying Alliance and Kennedy launched their "Give Us a Break" campaign. This campaign aimed to raise awareness about the bullying of autistic children in school and colleges, particularly during break times, highlighted the need for autistic children to feel safe by providing them opportunities to indulge in positive activities and to encourage schools and colleges to share the ways they can improve their social skills and keep them safe too.

She highlighted the activities that can keep children from bullying during lunch times. She also emphasised that there should be a strong communication between the parents and school, which comes up with a 24-hour curriculum for the children to get a better idea about their behaviour all day and to prevent them getting mixed messages by parents and teachers.

In 2001, Kennedy also set up a community college for adults. The former prime minister's wife, Samantha Cameron, was invited to the official opening of a special school set up by Kennedy with others in Kent, South East London.

Kennedy appeared on the BBC's People's Strictly for Comic Relief in 2015.

Kennedy's focus is now exclusively on her charity work; this includes working with others in the autistic and neurodivergent communities. In 2023 she worked with Metropolitan Police Service on producing the document: "Stop and Search guidance for autistic people".

Kennedy is a patron of Autism Support Crawley, Kilmarnock Horse Rescue, Cheshire Autism Practical Support, Square Peg Foundation, Camp Mohawk Autism Early Support, and an ambassador for Special Dreams Foundation, Autism Anglia Born Anxious, and Includability.

She is also a committee member of Ladies Of All Nations International Group.

== Awards ==
Kennedy was awarded an OBE in the Queen's Birthday Honours by Queen Elizabeth II at Buckingham Palace, for her services and campaigning work for autistic children. In 2009, she won an award "Woman of the Year", which runs with the collaboration of The Observer and Smooth Radio. Kennedy received the Institute of Directors chairman's special award for her contributions to the community. She is the "Achieving Mum of the Year" of Tesco Mum of the Year Awards 2013 for her campaigning work for autistic children.

In 2013 Kennedy was awarded an honorary doctorate from Teesside University, the university most associated with her hometown of Middlesbrough.

== Media ==
Kennedy's story has been published in various magazines and newspapers, and appeared as "pick of the day" on the Video Diaries documentary on BBC. Her story and the work she has been involved with was also discussed in depth in an episode of The Autism Podcast.

Kennedy hosts a weekly show on Women's Radio Station in addition to a monthly show on Gateway 97.8 FM.
