= Alex Oates =

English playwright

Alex Oates (born 1987 in Newcastle) is an English playwright from the North East.

== Background ==
Born in Newcastle, Oates was born to a nurse and policeman and raised in Whitley Bay in the North East of England. He moved to London to attend Middlesex University in 2006 where he studied Theatre Arts. Oates also studied for a semester at New Paltz where he specialised in dramatic writing under Prof. Laurence Carr.

On graduating Oates was selected to write for EastEnders: E20 and spent time in the story department at EastEnders. Oates was later selected out of thousands for the 2010 Old Vic New Voices 24 hour plays which sparked his career in theatre.

== Career ==
Oates first play Fan Fiction was produced as a reading at the St. James Theatre directed by Dominic Shaw and starring Iwan Rheon, Russell Tovey and Rebecca Ryan.

Oates then wrote Silk Road for the Edinburgh Fringe (Assembly). Silk Road tackles the issue of buying drugs online and was the first play funded by the digital currency Bitcoin, it starred James Baxter and was directed by Dominic Shaw.

Oates next play Pig was produced by Silent Uproar productions for Hull Truck Theatre July 2015 and later transferred to the New Diorama Theatre in September 2015. Pig was based on extensive research and interviews with police officers and was about the state of the British police force.

Oates has collaborated with actress Katie Sheridan to create new online romantic comedy, Match Not Found launched October 2015. Oates is also a recipient of the prestigious Peggy Ramsay Legacy grant.

Oates play All In a Row was long listed for the Bruntwood Prize in 2016 and a revised version won the Bolton Octagon's Top Five competition, being selected from 850 plays to receive a rehearsed reading in March 2017.

Following the boom in price of Bitcoin Silk Road was revived for Vault Festival London and Live Theatre Newcastle starring Josh Barrow. To mark the production it was published by Bloomsbury Methuen

Silk Road transferred into the West End in August 2018 where The Times four star review described it as "Sharp witted, effortlessly engaging and surprisingly sweet".

Oates next play All In A Row proved controversial at Southwark Playhouse for its use of puppetry and brutal take on the themes of severe autism. The Guardian's four star review described it as "a lively, compassionate and darkly humorous show with the unmistakable ring of truth". Oates was nominated for the Offie for Most Promising Playwright.

In 2023 Oates was awarded a Peter Schaffer commission by the Royal National Theatre to write a large scale play for Northern Stage. Oates began collaborating with filmmaker Andy Berriman and received the inaugural Northern Film Prize award for their short film 'Mortal'. His play 'The Filleting App', which explores food delivery driving and living on the poverty line was selected by the RSC for the 37 Plays Project.

In 2025, GIANTS, a short film directed by Andy Berriman won the Best Screenplay Award at Aesthetica Film Festival.

== Plays ==
- Zombie Nation (2011) as part of the 24 hour plays, Old Vic Theatre, directed by Ed Stambolloullan
- Fan Fiction (2012) Rehearsed Reading, St James Theatre, directed by Dominic Shaw
- Silk Road (2014) Assembly Studios, directed by Dominic Shaw
- Hansel (2015) Assemble Fest, Directed by Alex Mitchell
- Pig (2015) Hull Truck and New Diorama, Directed by Alex Mitchell
- Mutations (2016) Pleasance Islington, Reading in association with University of Oxford, directed by Gareth Taylor
- A Memory For Forgetting (2017) Arcola Theatre, The Miniaturists 61, Directed by Dominic Shaw
- All In A Row (2017) Bolton Octagon, Top Five Readings Season, Directed by Ben Occhipinti
- Silk Road (How To Buy Drugs Online)(2018), Vault Festival, Live Theatre, Trafalgar Studios Directed by Dominic Shaw
- Rules For Being A Man (2018), Norfolk Tour, Directed by Daniel Burgess
- All in a Row (2019), Southwark Playhouse, Directed by Dominic Shaw
- Our Liam of Lourdes (2019), BBC Radio 4, Directed by Jessica Dromgoole
- How To Explode (2019), Customs House South Shields, Directed by Fiona Martin
- Sealhugging (2021), Laurels Theatre, Whitley Bay
- The Filleting App (2023), selected for RSC 37 Plays project
