= Peter Bowles =

English actor (1936–2022)

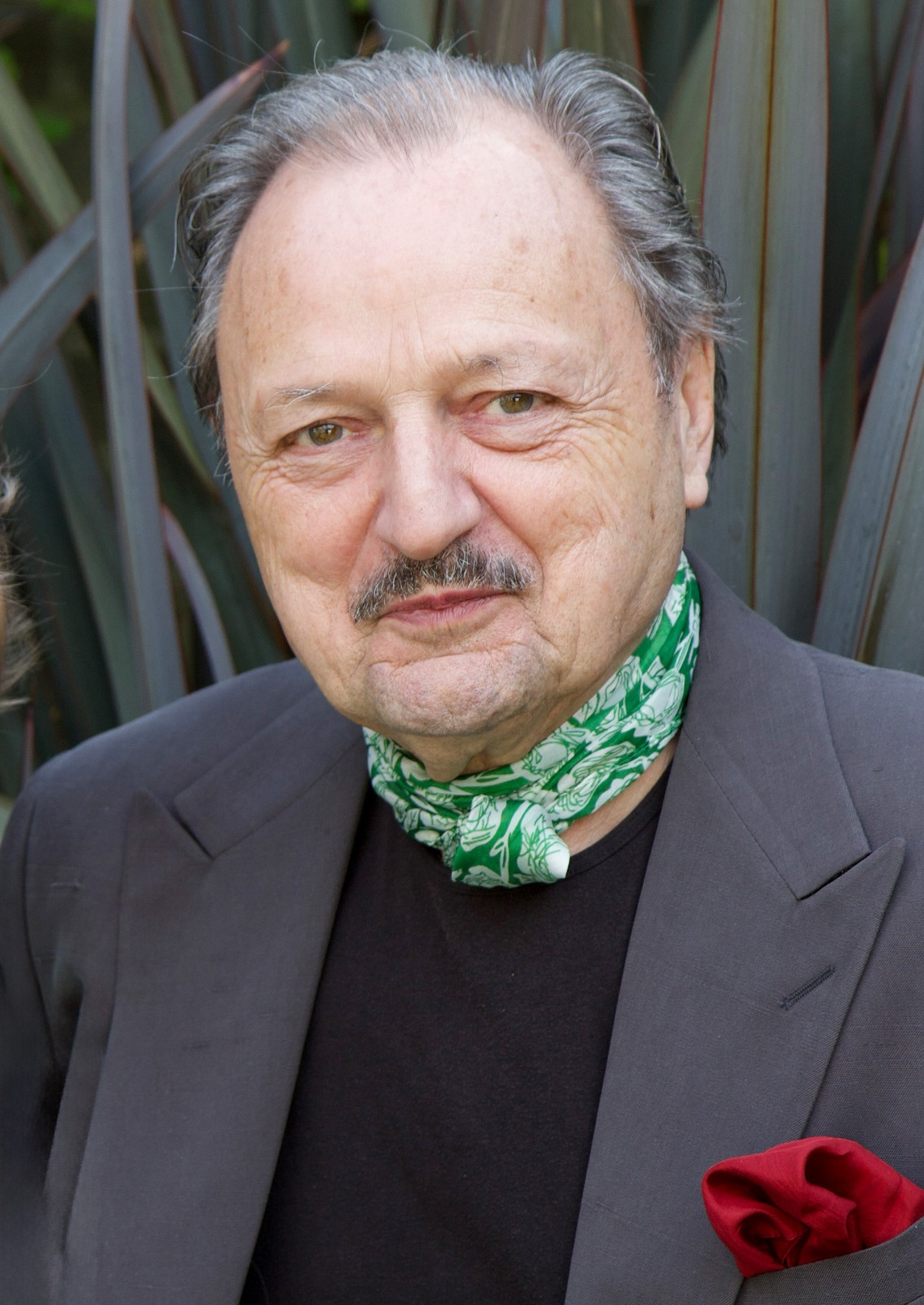
- Born: Peter John Bowles; 16 October 1936; Kensington, London, England
- Died: 17 March 2022 (aged 85); London, England
- Occupation: Actor
- Years active: 1956–2021
- Spouse: Susan Bennett (m. 1961)
- Children: 3

Peter John Bowles (16 October 1936 – 17 March 2022) was an English screen and stage actor, best known for playing Richard DeVere in To the Manor Born, as well as Guthrie Featherstone in Rumpole of the Bailey and Archie Glover in Only When I Laugh.

He gained prominence for television dramas such as Callan: A Magnum for Schneider and I, Claudius, before becoming recognised for his roles in sitcoms and television comedy dramas, such as The Bounder, The Irish R.M., Lytton's Diary, Executive Stress and Perfect Scoundrels.

== Early life and education ==
Bowles was born in Kensington, London, England. Much of his early life was spent on an estate in Northamptonshire and later in Nottingham. His father was Herbert Reginald Bowles, valet-companion and chauffeur to Drogo Montagu, son of the Earl of Sandwich, then a butler to the daughter of Lord Beaverbrook. His mother was Sarah Jane (née Harrison), from Scotland, who served as a nanny to the family of the Duke of Argyll before coming to England and working for Beaverbrook's family, which is where they met.

Upon the outbreak of the Second World War, Bowles's father was sent to the Rolls-Royce Aero-engine factory in Hucknall, near Nottingham, where the family lived in a small "two-up, two-down" house. Bowles attended the Nottingham High Pavement Grammar School, where he was taught English by the novelist Stanley Middleton, and won a scholarship to train as an actor at the Royal Academy of Dramatic Art (RADA). There he won the Kendall Prize and later he became an associate.

He later lived at 32 Kersall Drive, off the B682 in Highbury Vale, directly opposite the Henry Mellish Grammar School He attended Co-op Arts Centre.

== Theatre ==
After RADA, Bowles began his career with the Old Vic Company in 1956 playing small parts in Shakespeare's Macbeth, Romeo and Juliet, Troilus and Cressida and Richard II, with Claire Bloom, Paul Rogers and John Neville. After a season the company toured North America, concluding with a sell-out season at the Winter Garden Theatre on Broadway.

In March 1956, he was given a contract by the theatre company to take part on a 25-week tour of the US and Canada, from September 1956. He first appeared at the Nottingham Playhouse on Monday 2 December 1957, in Witness for the Prosecution, with Rosalie Westwater, Richard Mathews, Brian Spink, Gillian Martell, John Cater and producer John Rule.

Later in December 1957 he played the Wolf in a pantomime of Little Red Riding Hood, written by David Waller. In January 1958, the company put on Henry V, with him playing the Constable of France. In February 1958, the company put on The Perfect Woman and Three Sisters (play) by Chekhov. In March the company put on Our Town. From mid-April the company put on She Stoops to Conquer, where he played Sir Charles Marlow, and the production featured John Woodvine.

Bowles then joined the Bristol Old Vic Company for a season playing character parts and taking two Shakespeare productions to the Baalbeck Festival. This led to him being offered two plays by the English Stage Company at the Royal Court Theatre, London in September 1960: Dr Copperthwaite in The Happy Haven written by John McGragh and directed by Bill Gaskell, and Kirill in Platanov by Checkov, directed by George Devine, which starred Rex Harrison.

In 1961, after appearing in J.B. at the Phoenix Theatre directed by Laurier Lister in September (which closed after four weeks on the day of his wedding), Bowles was cast in October of that year as Roger in Bonne Soupe, starring Coral Browne and directed by Eleanor Fazan at the Comedy Theatre and then Wyndhams Theatre.

Later, Bowles was in Alan Ayckbourn's Absent Friends, also starring Richard Briers, at the Garrick Theatre in 1975. Then came Tom Stoppard's Dirty Linen and New-Found-Land at the Arts Theatre in 1976. (Bowles had last played there in 1963 in Anthony Powell's Afternoon Men in a cast that also included James Fox, Alan Howard and the actress and pop artist Pauline Boty). In 1980 in starred in Born in the Gardens by Peter Nichols directed by Clifford Williams first at the Bristol Old Vic and then at the Globe.

Bowles's first starring role in the theatre after many years of TV successes was as Archie Rice in John Osborne's The Entertainer at the Shaftesbury Theatre in 1986; he was the first actor to play the part in London since Laurence Olivier in 1957. In 1990 Bowles starred opposite Michael Gambon in Alan Ayckbourn's Man of the Moment at the Globe Theatre

The role of Vic Parkes was Bowles's first, but not last, performance as an East End gangster. After Running Late Sir Peter Hall began to offer Bowles a succession of leading roles in West End theatre, including Terence Rattigan's Separate Tables opposite Patricia Hodge. and George Bernard Shaw's Major Barbara with Jemma Redgrave. George S. Kaufman's The Royal Family and Noël Coward's Hay Fever, both opposite Judi Dench at the Theatre Royal Haymarket, followed. In 1996 Bowles played Arnolphe in Molière's The School for Wives at the Piccadilly Theatre.

Another play for Hall, this time at the Theatre Royal, Bath, was Rattigan's The Browning Version. Bowles' last play for Hall was Sheridan's The Rivals in 2011, opposite Dame Penelope Keith, again at the Theatre Royal, Haymarket. His other West End theatre plays include Coward's Present Laughter, Anthony Shaffer's Sleuth, Peter Nichols' Born in the Gardens, Frederick Knott's Wait Until Dark and in 2004, Simon Gray's The Old Masters. directed by Harold Pinter at the Comedy Theatre.

Then again at the Haymarket Theatre in Hutchinson's The Beau, opposite Richard McCabe, and Rattigan's In Praise of Love at the Apollo Theatre. In a South Bank Show special Melvyn Bragg interviewed George MacDonald Fraser, and Bowles played the part of Fraser's hero 'Harry Flashman'. Other parts include Higgins in Shaw's Pygmalion and the General in Jean Anouilh's The Waltz of the Toreadors, both at the Chichester Festival Theatre; and Judge Brack in Ibsen's Hedda Gabler (translation: Frank McGuinness) opposite Francesca Annis.

Bowles played the ultimate gangster in Mellis and Scinto's Gangster No 1 at the Almeida Theatre in 1995 for which he held the film rights; he raised money from Channel 4 Films and was executive producer for the film Gangster No. 1 (2000), starring Paul Bettany.

Bowles's final starring role was Father Merrin in The Exorcist at the Phoenix Theatre directed by Sean Mathias.

== Television ==
Bowles was warned by casting directors on leaving the Royal Academy of Dramatic Art (RADA) that because of his swarthy looks he would never play an Englishman. Indeed, his early career in television consisted mostly of playing villains (usually foreign) in such shows as The Avengers (Bowles featured in four series), Danger Man, The Saint, Department S, The Persuaders! and The Prisoner (as 'A' in "A. B. and C.", 1967).

Bowles played Balor ("the most evil man in the universe") in an episode of Space: 1999. He also appeared as Caractacus in the TV adaptation of I, Claudius (1976). His first major English role was Guthrie Featherstone QC MP, whom he played in many series of Rumpole of the Bailey (1978–1992), while in 1975 he played David Grant, husband of Abby Grant in the BBC series Survivors; his character died in the first episode.

After playing his first television comedy role, Hilary, in an episode of Rising Damp, Bowles was often seen as a comedy actor and parts in comedy series such as To the Manor Born, Only When I Laugh, The Bounder, and Executive Stress followed; however, he turned down the role of Jerry in The Good Life.

The success of To the Manor Born, playing the part of Richard DeVere (a nouveau riche millionaire supermarket owner originally from Czechoslovakia) which had audiences of over 20 million for all twenty-one episodes, changed Bowles' life. After being told by the BBC his success in comedy meant he would never work in drama again, Bowles devised a drama series called Lytton's Diary, which he sold to ITV.

It was while starring in Lytton's Diary that he was offered the title role of Major Yeates in the television series The Irish R.M. for Channel 4. A headline in The Evening Standard, after the success of the series, read "Bowles Saves Channel 4".

Much of Bowles' work was now being shown on American television, including PBS's Masterpiece Theatre, and he was very flattered to discover that admirers in America of his work included Stephen Sondheim, Quentin Tarantino and Marlon Brando. Following The Irish R.M., Bowles co-devised the comedy/drama series Perfect Scoundrels, which ran for three series on ITV.

In 1991 Bowles took an idea for a dramatic film to the BBC; it was accepted, and after being written and adapted by Simon Gray, became Running Late, a film in the Screen One series. This was to be Bowles' first performance on BBC television since To the Manor Born a decade earlier. Bowles, besides starring, also co-produced with Verity Lambert. The film went on to win the Golden Gate Award in 1993 at the San Francisco International Film Festival.

From 2016 to 2019, Bowles played the recurring role of the Duke of Wellington in the award-winning ITV series Victoria.

== Personal life and death ==
Bowles married Susan Bennett on 8 April 1961. The couple lived in Barnes, south-west London and had three children.

Bowles died aged 85, on 17 March 2022, from cancer.

== Filmography ==
=== Film ===
Year	Title	Role	Notes
1961	Wings of Death	Williams	Short
1962	Live Now – Pay Later	Reginald Parker	
1963	The Informers	Peter the Pole	Uncredited
1965	Three Hats for Lisa	Pepper	
1965	Dead Man's Chest	Joe	Edgar Wallace Mysteries
1966	Isadora Duncan, the Biggest Dancer in the World	Paris Singer	TV film
1966	Blow-Up	Ron	
1968	The Charge of the Light Brigade	Paymaster Captain Duberly	
1969	The Assassination Bureau	Jealous lover of 'La Belle Amie'	Uncredited
1969	Laughter in the Dark	Paul	
1969	The Stiffkey Scandals of 1932	Roland Oliver, KC	TV film
1969	Taste of Excitement	Guardi	
1970	Eyewitness	Victor Grazzini	
1972	A Day in the Death of Joe Egg	Freddie	
1972	Shelley	Byron	TV film
1972	Endless Night	Reuben	
1973	The Offence	Cameron	
1973	The Legend of Hell House	Hanley	
1973	Thinking Man As Hero	Frank Cordroy	TV film
1977	For the Love of Benji	Ronald	
1977	The Disappearance	Jefferies	
1988	Beryl Markham: A Shadow on the Sun	Lord Jack Carberry	TV film
1989	Try This One for Size	Igor	
1992	Running Late	George Grant	TV film
1993	Passport to Murder	Inspector Bullion	TV film
1995	The Steal	Lord Childwell	
1998	Little White Lies	Oliver	TV film
1999	Tumbled	Mr Gilzean	Short
2000	One of the Hollywood Ten	Jack Warner	
2001	In Love and War	Melville	TV film
2005	Colour Me Kubrick	Cyril	
2007	Ballet Shoes	Sir Donald Houghton	TV film
2008	Freebird	The Chairman	
2008	The Bank Job	Miles Urquart	
2011	Love's Kitchen	Max Templeton	
2014	Lilting	Alan	
2014	Peterman	Old Boy	
2015	Meet Pursuit Delange: The Movie	Sir Edward Mead	
2016	Not Waving	Archie	Short
2017	We Are Tourists	William	
2018	Together	Philip	
2021	Off the Rails	Vicar	

=== Television ===
Year	Title	Role	Notes
1958	Armchair Theatre	Simpson	Episode: "Underground"
1959	The Last Chronicle of Barset	Constable	Episode: "How Did He Get It?"
1961	Doctor Knock	First Countryman	Episode: "Act 2"
1961	Magnolia Street	Benny Edelman	Series regular
1961	ITV Play of the Week	Lieutenant Myers	Episode: "Conflict in the Sun"
1961	Wings of Death	Policeman	TV film
1962	Armchair Theatre	Pete	Episode: "Thank You and Goodnight"
1963	It Happened Like This	Edwardes	Episode: "Superstitions"
1963	Crane	Nikkolai Drax	Episode: "Three Days to Die"
1963	The Avengers	Neil Anstice	Episode: "Second Sight"
1964	The Saint	Maurice Kerr	Episode: "Lida"
1964	Drama 61-67	Captain Buckley	Episode: "The Crunch"
1964	The Protectors	Dr Fothergill	Episode: "The Bottle Shop"
1964	The Great War	Winston Churchill	Episode: "So Sleep Easy in Your Beds"
1964	ITV Play of the Week	Razumikhin	Episode: "Crime and Punishment"
1964	Danger Man	Gamal	Episode: "Fish on the Hook"
1964	Armchair Theatre	Morgan	Episode: "The Pretty English Girls"
1964	Armchair Theatre	Dermot Llewelyn	Episode: "A Certain Kind of Silence"
1964	No Hiding Place	Joe Bask	Episode: "Real Class"
1965	No Hiding Place	Machin	Episode: "A Fistful of Trouble"
1965	Public Eye	Freddy	Episode: "A Harsh World for Zealots"
1965	Love Story	Jack Everett	Episode: "Never Sup at Home"
1965	Crane	Vincent Morrow	Episode: "A Cargo of Cornflour"
1965	Edgar Wallace Mysteries	Joe	Episode: "Dead Man's Chest"
1965	Jury Room	Detective-Inspector	Episode: "The Side of Mercy"
1965	Six of the Best	Tom Brown	Episode: "Me and My Big Mouth"
1965	Famous Gossips	Garçon de café	Episode: "Oscar Wilde: Monsieur Sebastian Melmoth"
1965	Out of the Unknown	Policeman	Episode: "Some Lapse of Time"
1965	The Avengers	John Harvey	Episode: "Dial a Deadly Number"
1966	Emergency Ward 10	Philip Royston	Recurring role
1966	Sunday Night	Melville	Episode: "The Quarry: Portrait of a Man as a Paralysed Artist"
1966	Redcap	Butros	Episode: "Buckingham Palace"
1966	The Informer	Jack Hart	2 episodes
1966	The Baron	Jim Gaynor	Episode: "You Can't Win Them All"
1966	Armchair Theatre	Sergeant Howlett	Episode: "Don't Utter a Note"
1967	The Avengers	Thyssen	Episode: "Escape in Time"
1967	The Saint	Serge	Episode: "The Art Collectors"
1967	Armchair Theatre	Toby Meres	Episode: "A Magnum for Schneider" (Pilot of "Callan" series)
1967	Adam Adamant Lives!	D.K. Davies	Episode: "Another Little Drink"
1967	The Troubleshooters	Abbas Ramzi	Episode: "My Daughter Knows Her Way Around"
1967	Sir Arthur Conan Doyle	Harvey Deacon	Episode: "Playing with Fire"
1967	The Prisoner	'A'	Episode: "A. B. and C."
1968	Dr. Finlay's Casebook	Professor Baxter	Episode: "The Dynamizer"
1968	The Avengers	Ezdorf	Episode: "Get-A-Way!"
1968	Champion House	Degnos	Episode: "The Golden Fleece"
1968	Love Story	Brian	Episode: "The Egg on the Face of the Tiger"
1968	Sherlock Holmes	Joseph Harrison	Episode: "The Naval Treaty"
1969	Happy Ever After	Tony Bulstrode	Episode: "The Party Piece"
1969	Department S	Borowitsch	Episode: "Six Days"
1969	W. Somerset Maugham	Robert Crosbie	Episode: "The Letter"
1969	The Gold Robbers	Stockbroker	Episode: "The Kill"
1969	Softly, Softly	Conn	Episode: "One Thing Leads to Another"
1969	Take Three Girls	Jeremy Mandl-Fry	2 episodes
1970	Ryan International	Alain	Episode: "The Dead Live Longer"
1970	The Main Chance	Roger Lamb	Episode: "The Best Legal System in the World"
1970	Happy Ever After	Michael	Episode: "The Ambassador"
1971	Hadleigh	Robert Charlton	Episode: "Breakdown"
1971	The Ten Commandments	Tommy Radd	Episode: "Black Eye on Sunday"
1971	Brett	William Saxby	Series regular
1971	The Rivals of Sherlock Holmes	Inspector Saunders	Episode: "The Woman in the Big Hat"
1971	The Persuaders!	Mitchell	Episode: "Element of Risk"
1971	ITV Sunday Night Theatre	Jack Campbell-Barnes	Episode: "Who Killed Santa Claus"
1972	The Shadow of the Tower	Bernard de Vignolles	Episode: "A Fly in the Ointment"
1972	Alexander the Greatest	Paul Clutton-Browne	Episode: "Renata's Secret Affair"
1972	Harriet's Back in Town	Jack	2 episodes
1972	The Protectors	Gregor Kofax	Episode: "Triple Cross"
1973	The Adventures of Black Beauty	Mr Duffield	Episode: "Wild Justice"
1973	Crown Court	Gerald Somerville	3 episodes
1973	Cheri	Patron	2 episodes
1973	Arthur of the Britons	Hecla	Episode: "Rowena"
1973	Omnibus	Oscar	Episode: "The Runaway"
1973	Murder Must Advertise	Major Todd Milligan	Mini-series
1974	Napoleon and Love	Captain Murat	Mini-series
1974	Special Branch	Igor	Episode: "Downwind of Angels"
1974	Good Girl	Colin Peale	Series regular
1975	Public Eye	Croxley	Episode: "They All Sound Simple at First"
1975	Thriller	Superintendent Lucas	Episode: "The Double Kill"
1975	Survivors	David Grant	Episode: "The Fourth Horseman"
1975	Churchill's People	Thistlewood	Episode: "Death of Liberty"
1975	Comedy Playhouse	Patrick	Episode: "Only on Sundays"
1975	Space: 1999	Balor	Episode: "End of Eternity"
1976	The Crezz	Ken Green	Series regular
1976	I, Claudius	Caractacus	Mini-series
1977	A Roof Over My Head	Jack Askew	Episode: "A Roof Over My Head"
1977	Rising Damp	Hilary	Episode: "Stage Struck"
1978	BBC Play of the Month	Inspector Hounslow	Episode: "Flint"
1978	Pennies from Heaven	Prosecuting Counsel	Episode: "Says My Heart"
1978	The Sunday Drama	Prince Borodski	Episode: "The Marrying Kind"
1978	Bless Me, Father	Fred Bowlby	Episode: "The Doomsday Chair"
1978–1992	Rumpole of the Bailey	Guthrie Featherstone	Series regular
1979	Tales of the Unexpected	Major Haddock	Episode: "Neck"
1979	Turtle's Progress	Superintendent Percy Weston	1 episode
1979–1982	Only When I Laugh	Archie Glover	Series regular
1979–1981, 2007	To the Manor Born	Richard DeVere	Series regular
1980	Nanny Knows Best	Billy Benson	
1981	Vice Versa	Paul Bultitude	Series regular
1982–1983	The Bounder	Howard Booth	Series regular
1983	Storyboard	Neville Lytton	Episode: "Lytton's Diary"
1983–1985	The Irish R.M.	Major Sinclair Yeates	Series regular
1985–1986	Lytton's Diary	Neville Lytton	Series regular
1987–1988	Executive Stress	Donald Fairchild	Series regular
1990–1992	Perfect Scoundrels	Guy Buchanan	Series regular
1992	Screen One	George Grant	Episode: "Running Late"
2000	Randall & Hopkirk (Deceased)	Captain Graves	Episode: "The Best Years of Your Death
2003	Holby City	Bernie Farraday	Episode: "Love Nor Money"
2005	Jericho	Fleming	Mini-series
2008	Agatha Christie's Poirot	Sir Roderick Horsfield	Episode: "Third Girl"
2010	Masterpiece Mystery	Sir Roderick Horsfield	Episode: "Hercule Poirot, Series X: Third Girl"
2011	The Sarah Jane Adventures	Lionel Carson	Episode: "The Man Who Never Was"
2015	Citizen Khan	Lord Anstruther	Episode: "Farley Manor"
2016	The Life of Rock with Brian Pern	Brian Pern's Father	Episode: "The Thotch Reunion"
2016	Murder	Greville Cotterall	Mini-series
2016–2019	Victoria	Duke of Wellington	Series regular

== Awards and honours ==
- RADA Scholarship (1954)
- Madge Kendal Prize (1955)
- Male Comedy Star Award (1983)
- ITV Personality of the Year (1984)
- The Golden Gate Award (San Francisco International Film Festival, 1993)
- Hon. Doctor of Literature, for contributions to the theatre, television drama and entertainment. (Nottingham Trent University, 2002)

== Books ==
- Autobiography: Ask Me if I'm Happy (Simon & Schuster, 2010)
- Behind the Curtain: The Job of Acting (Oberon Masters Series, 2012)
