= Special needs (disambiguation) =

Special needs is an older term for disability which means that a person may require provision of accommodations, supports and services to have equitable access to opportunities and participate in the society.

Special needs may also refer to:

== Category of people ==
- Alternative education, includes a number of approaches to teaching and learning separate from that offered by mainstream traditional education
- Special education, educating students with special educational needs
- Special education in the United Kingdom
- Special Needs Evacuation Tracking System, Texas

== Entertainment ==
- Special Needs (film), a 2007 film by Isaak James
- Special Needs, former name of the British band The Needs
- "Special Needs" (Placebo song), a song by the British rock band

== Other ==
- Special needs exception, an exception to the Fourth Amendment's general requirement that government searches be supported by a warrant and probable cause
