= Shout About TV =

DVD game

- Designers: ODVD
- Publishers: Hasbro
- Players: At least 4 (played in teams)
- Setup time: none
- Playing time: 30 to 45 minutes
- Chance: Low
- Age range: 13+
- Skills: TV show knowledge
- Each volume of the DVD game includes three prearranged games; unlike Scene It?, "Shout About" games' questions do not change every time the game is played.

Shout About TV is a DVD trivia game by ODVD and Hasbro, as a follow-up to their "Shout About Movies" and "Shout About Music" games. Each disc contains 3 games; two volumes were released.

== Background & release ==
Kristin Adams, from American Idol, is the game's host. Both volumes of "Shout About TV" were released on 24 August 2005, three weeks after the release of "Shout About Music." Hasbro promoted the game, alongside Shout About Music, as among its releases for the 2005 holiday season.

== Critical reception ==
The game was met with mostly positive reviews from critics. The staff of Entertainment Weekly awarded the game a "B" and praised the game's "hysterical fun," but commented that the game is more difficult that "Shout About Movies," and expressed dismay over the fact that each disc contains only three games. Nights and Weekends' Angela Dalecki praised the variety of shows included but, like Entertainment Weekly, was disappointed by the fact that each disc includes only three games.

== Credits ==
Host

- Kristin Adams

Voice-overs

- Paul Mercier

Director

- Ethan Shaftel

Producers

- Norman Beil
- Chris Kantrowitz
- Alex Rose

Writers

- Hillel Aron
- Norman Beil
- Aris Blevins
- Jamison Selby
