= I Wanna Be a Soap Star =

- Starring: Michael Bruno; Debbi Morgan (2004-2006); Mark Teschner (2004); Judy Blye Wilson (2005); Julie Madison (2006); Hogan Sheffer (2007); Mary Beth Evans (2007)

Production
- Executive producers: Lisa Bourgoujian; Bill Paolantonio; Eric Schotz
- Running time: 60 minutes

Original release
- Network: SOAPnet
- Release: October 16, 2004 – October 9, 2007

I Wanna Be a Soap Star is a reality television series which debuted on the cable channel SOAPnet in 2004. The show is hosted by All My Children star and ex-Dancing with the Stars participant, Cameron Mathison. It is based on the British reality series Soapstars.

== I Wanna Be a Soap Star ==
The first season debuted on October 16, 2004. Twelve contestants competed in various acting challenges for the prize of a role on General Hospital. The performances, which involved learning how to cry on camera, filming love scenes and fight scenes, among other soap staples, were judged by film and daytime television actress Debbi Morgan, General Hospital casting director Mark Teschner and agent Michael Bruno. The show underwent some criticism when the winner, Mykel Shannon-Jenkins, was given a role as a police officer named Officer Byron Murphy that barely rose above extra status. His character was later shot and killed by Jesse Beaudry (Matt Marraccini) in July 2005.

Contestants for the first season included Maya Gilbert, Brianna Konefall, Alisia Geanopulos, Robyn Hyden, Mykel Shannon Jenkins, Kent Winfrey, Nick Steele, Steve (last name unknown), Jeremy (last name unknown), Michael (last name unknown), Kimberly (last name unknown) and Kelly Thiebaud.

== I Wanna Be a Soap Star 2 ==
The second season debuted on June 23, 2005, this time promising a contract role on All My Children. AMC casting director Judy Blye Wilson replaced Teschner as a judge. The show continued to be viewed as innocuous entertainment, but in July 2005 was criticized by Soap Opera Weekly editor Carolyn Hinsey for a segment in which all the contestants were asked difficult questions (on matters such as stem cell research) and the person who gave the least interesting answers was eliminated. Hinsey said soap reporters rarely asked questions on controversial issues and that no actor was ever fired based on giving boring interviews. The second winner of the show was Alec Musser who became the second actor on All My Children to portray Del Henry who was last played by The Bold and the Beautiful star Winsor Harmon from 1994 to 1995. He first aired on August 19, 2005.

Contestants for the second season included Toussaint Waterman, Prudence Zdravkovic, Alec Musser, Isaak James, Christina Fandano, Alia Urbanski, Farley Jackson, Nicole (last name unknown), Cathy (last name unknown), Maiesha (last name unknown), Sean (last name unknown) and Joe Masi.

== I Wanna Be a Soap Star 3 ==
The third season debuted on June 8, 2006, with contestants competing for a contract with One Life to Live. The winner was Mike Jerome who, unlike his predecessors, was out after his thirteen-week contract was up. Third season contestant BethAnn Bonner was offered a contract by the series, and debuted as Talia Sahid on December 21, 2006.

Contestants for the third season included Shamika Cotton, BethAnn Bonner, Lauren Ryland, Lindsey Spruill, Mike Jerome, Michael Albanese, Lukas Hassel, Dean Cochran, Ayinde Jones, and Kelly McGarry.

== I Wanna Be a Soap Star 4 ==
The fourth and final season debuted on August 14, 2007, with the winner promised a 13-week contract on Days of Our Lives. Former Days head writer Hogan Sheffer, former star Mary Beth Evans (who portrayed Kayla Johnson) and talent manager Michael Bruno served as judges. Ashlee Holland was named as the winner, and debuted on December 26, 2007, as Crystal Miller.

Other contestants for the fourth season included, Jimena Hoyos (runner-up), Monica Thomas, Bo Gorman, Travis Wood, Yves Bright, Joyce Liu, Corey Shelton, Justin Kahn, and Patricia Mizen.
