= Jimena Hoyos =

Colombian actress

Jimena Hoyos Souza (born 31 December 1977) is an actress from Bogotá, Colombia. Hoyos has worked in television, short films, and films internationally. She gained recognition for her role in the film The Devil Wears Prada and further prominence as the runner-up in the Soapnet Original Series I Wanna Be a Soap Star.

== Background ==
Hoyos studied plastic arts in Colombia before relocating to the United States of America (USA), where she pursued a career as a magazine editor. While in the USA, she attended acting classes at the Stella Adler Studio of Acting and in Sheila Gray Acting Studio. Just two weeks after beginning her acting training, she landed roles in Colombian television series. Encouraged by her success, she transitioned to the USA to further pursue acting. She appeared in films, short films, and series, and worked as a model.

== Career ==
- Francisco el Matemático (1999) - Colombia
- Solterita y a la Orden - Colombia
- Se armó la gorda - Colombia
- Héroes de Turno
- La Madre
- Hombres de Honor
- The Devil Wears Prada (2006)
- I Wanna Be a Soap Star (short roles)
- Dexter
- Pizza, Peanuts and Wine
- New In Town (2009)

== Gozques Foundation ==
Hoyos has been actively involved with her foundation named Gozques, where she feeds more than one hundred dogs daily using an efficient food dispenser that she created specifically for street dogs. she designs frames for the pictures she takes of the dogs using elements sourced from junkyards, making them reusable and fitting the environment of the picture. Through her advocacy, she has encouraged many celebrities, such as the British racing driver Sam Reklaw, to support the cause by decorating his race car with logos of various animal shelters, raising awareness for the issue.
