= Shout About Movies =

Movie trivia DVD game

- DVD cover for volume 1 of Shout about Movies
- Publishers: Parker Brothers
- Players: At least 4 (played in teams)
- Setup time: none
- Playing time: 30 to 45 minutes
- Chance: Low
- Age range: 13+
- Skills: Movie/Pop Culture knowledge
- Each volume of the DVD game includes prearranged games; unlike Scene It?, "Shout About" games' questions do not change every time the game is played.

Shout About Movies is a movie trivia DVD game played entirely on a television. The game is designed to be played with four or more players. A television remote is the only device necessary to play the game. Players split up into two teams, shout out answers to movie trivia questions, and use the remote to keep score. Whichever player shouts the answer correctly, their team gets the point. The game has eight rounds. Similar to You Don't Know Jack and Trivial Pursuit, the DVD keeps track of the score. Each DVD contains three games.

== Gameplay ==
The game consists of 8 rounds.

Round One: Movie Lines

Snippets of dialogue from movies are played, and the teams try to name the films they are from.

Round Two: Still Crazies

Stills from movie comes together piece by piece; as in Round One, the object is to name the movie they are from.

Round Three: Match Round

Clips from five movies are shown. Teams must match the films to their corresponding trivia facts.

Round Four: In the Movies

Teams try to guess several words or phrases, pertaining to movies, that all fall into the same category (e.g. "Hotels in the movies").

Round Five: Movie Clips

Clips from movies are shown, and the teams try to name the movies.

Round Six: Made to Order

A series of events or movie titles are displayed, and they must be arranged smallest to largest or chronologically based on the category.

Round Seven: Lighting Round

Five words or phrases all referring to the same movie appear onscreen. Both teams try to name the movie the phrases reference.

Round Eight: Final Bet

A fill-in-the-blank question is asked. Both teams bet 5, 15, 30, or all of their points; if they answer the question correctly, they gain that number of points, but if their answer is incorrect, they lose that number of points.

== Release & reception ==
The game was released on November 20, 2004. It was met with positive reviews. Kidz World awarded the game 5 out of 5 stars, praising the game's "excitement." CNN's review was also positive, praising the game's layout and production but expressing concern over the fact that the game cannot easily be replayed (due to the fact that each game never changes). In a review for DVD Talk, critic Adam Tyner praised the game's interface and difficulty level, and argued that although the DVD's three games weren't replayable, the game's price was comparable to a movie on DVD.

== Follow-up releases ==
ODVD has created 4 volumes of "Shout About Movies", as well as 2 volumes each of "Shout About Music" and "Shout About Television", and one volume each of "Shout About Country Music", and a Spanish-language music game called "Grita y Acierta". Most recently ODVD created the "Trivial Pursuit: Totally On-Screen" DVD game, which puts the game board on-screen for a faster-paced game with more head-to-head competition, video clips, and music.

== Personnel ==
Adapted from game credits and IMDb

Director

Ethan Shaftel

Host

David Burke

Voice-overs

Mark Avery and Gabrielle Carteris
