= Ashlee Holland =

American actress

Ashlee Renee Holland (born June 18, 1979) is an American actress, dancer, model, and most recent winner of I Wanna Be a Soap Star. She has appeared on Days of Our Lives as a result of her win.

Born in Portland, Oregon, Holland is the daughter of Al Holland, former Major League Baseball relief pitcher who played for the Phillies, Yankees and Pirates. She was raised in Roanoke, Virginia. In October 2007, Holland won the reality TV contest I Wanna Be a Soap Star over hundreds of wannabe actors to get the part on the popular soap Days of Our Lives. She was the first woman to win this contest. She has appeared in numerous music videos and commercials. She appeared in such films as Torque, The Hot Chick and Honey. She co-hosted Di Media Online's grand opening gala at Level 3 in Hollywood She is also the host in the 2005 music trivia DVD game Shout About Music.

Originally slated to start work immediately after the finale of Soap Star, Ashlee's start date was pushed back. According to sources,

"Holland was originally schedule to have only a few days off before reporting to work. However, Holland's October 19th start date with DAYS was pushed back to allow head writer Hogan Sheffer to craft a "new, exciting storyline" for the actress. Sheffer also served as a judge on this year's Soap Star panel. Holland is now schedule to begin work on November 30th with a first airdate of Wednesday, December 26th."

Ashlee went on to appear as Crystal Miller in Days of our Lives, however she was not picked up as a permanent castmate and left the soap in early 2008.

== Filmography ==
Film
Year	Title	Role	Notes
2003	Regret	Friend #1	Short film
2010	Choices	Labor and Delivery Nurse 1	Short film

Television
Year	Title	Role	Notes
2007	I Wanna Be a Soap Star	Herself / Winner	10 episodes
2007–08	Days of Our Lives	Crystal Miller	16 episodes
2009	Buppies	Bisty	4 episodes
2012	Criminal Minds	Pregnant Woman	Episode: "I Love You, Tommy Brown"

Video games
Year	Title	Role	Notes
2005	Shout About Music	Host	

Music videos
Year	Title	Artist
2003	"Dirt off Your Shoulder"	Jay-Z
2003	"One Heart"	Celine Dion
2005	"Don't Phunk with My Heart"	The Black Eyed Peas

=== Commercials ===
- Lincoln Mercury "Men of Mariner" (2005)
- Verizon "Tech Makeover" (2005)
- Wendy's "My Burger" (2005)
- Old Navy "Coffee House" (2004)
