= New in Town =

2009 film by Jonas Elmer

- Directed by: Jonas Elmer
- Written by: C. Jay Cox; Ken Rance
- Produced by: Peter Safran; Darryl Taja; Tracey E. Edmonds; Paul Brooks; Phyllis Laing; Andrew Paquin
- Starring: Renée Zellweger; Harry Connick, Jr. J.K. Simmons; Frances Conroy; Siobhan Fallon Hogan
- Cinematography: Chris Seager
- Edited by: Troy Takaki
- Music by: John Swihart
- Production companies: Gold Circle Films; Epidemic Pictures; The Safran Company; Edmonds Entertainment
- Distributed by: Lionsgate (North America; through Maple Pictures in Canada); Mandate Pictures (International)
- Release date: 30 January 2009
- Running time: 97 minutes
- Countries: United States; Canada
- Language: English
- Budget: $8 million
- Box office: $29 million

New in Town is a 2009 romantic comedy-drama film directed by Jonas Elmer, starring Renée Zellweger, Harry Connick Jr., and Siobhan Fallon Hogan. It was filmed in Winnipeg and Selkirk, Manitoba, Canada, and in Los Angeles and South Beach, Miami, Florida.

Despite negative reviews, the film achieved a mild box office success, earning $30 million against its $8 million budget.

== Plot ==
High-powered consultant Lucy Hill, who loves her upscale Miami lifestyle, is sent to New Ulm, Minnesota, to oversee the restructuring of a food manufacturing plant. The factory is meant to add Japanese automation, so it reduces staff by at least 50 percent.

After leaving sunny Miami and arriving in cold Minnesota, Lucy finds a frosty reception from the weather, the locals, icy roads and a culture she has difficulty dealing with. As an example, before her first day at the factory she proceeds to insult Ted Mitchell, the guest of honor at a home-cooked meal organized by the plant's secretary Blanche. The next day, Ted turns out to be the head of the workers' union. Likewise, she antagonizes the waitress in the local hangout, Flo. She turns out to be the ex-wife of the plant's foreman Stu, who she will fire.

Lucy learns to appreciate the locals and their way of life, and vice versa. In one of the various scenes, Ted in his pickup truck rescues her from freezing to death when she gets stuck in the snow as she swerves to evade a cow wandering on the road. Later, Lucy's knowledge about fashion and style helps Ted's 13-year-old daughter to get ready for her first dance. Eventually, Lucy kisses Ted as they acknowledge their mutual attraction.

At a Florida corporate meeting, Lucy is ordered to close down the plant, which will put the entire community out of work. Blanche finds her on her return, to confront her about a list of employees that are going to be fired that she inadvertently found in the office. Lucy unhappily reveals that the company plans to shut down the plant completely. She is forced to reconsider her goals and priorities, and find a way to save the town.

After getting another big bowl of tapioca pudding, prepared according to Blanche's healthier secret recipe; Lucy decided to have the company produce and market the pudding. She reproposes the company's former yogurt production line and the existing personnel for the venture.

When the tapioca becomes extremely successful, Lucy's company again wants to shut down the small Minnesota plant, which cannot produce enough for the national market they envision. However, Lucy puts together a group of financiers who purchase the plant, with a contract that will gradually transfer ownership to the employees.

As part of the deal, Lucy becomes the CEO. Lucy announces the purchase to the employees gathered on the plant floor, including a now clean-shaven Ted, who pledges the cooperation of the Union. Lucy and Ted seal the deal with a kiss, applauded by everyone.

== Cast ==
- Renée Zellweger as Lucy Hill
- Harry Connick Jr. as Ted Mitchell
- J.K. Simmons as Stu Kopenhafer
- Siobhan Fallon Hogan as Blanche Gunderson
- Frances Conroy as Trudy Van Uuden
- Jimena Hoyos as Cathy
- Ordena Stephens-Thompson as Leslie

== Reception ==
=== Box office ===
New in Town grossed $16.7 million domestically (United States and Canada) and $12.3 million in other territories, for a worldwide total of $29.0 million, against a budget of $8.0 million. Released on 30 January 2009, it ranked at No. 8 at the domestic box office for its first week – its only week in the Top 10.

=== Critical response ===
On the review aggregator website Rotten Tomatoes, 28% of 171 critics' reviews are positive, with an average rating of 4.4/10. The website's consensus reads: "Clichéd and short on charm, New In Town is a pat genre exercise that fails to bring the necessary heat to its Minnesota setting." Metacritic, which uses a weighted average, assigned the film a score of 29 out of 100, based on 32 critics, indicating "generally unfavorable" reviews.

Allan Hunter of the Daily Express has said, "Predictable and uninspired, it is one more example of the dumb comedies that Hollywood is churning out at an alarming rate." Peter Bradshaw of The Guardian was also critical, stating "Renée Zellweger's rabbity, dimply pout – surely the strangest facial expression in Hollywood – simpers and twitches out of the screen in this moderate girly flick that adheres with almost religious fanaticism to the feelgood romcom handbook."

== DVD ==
The "making of..." feature on the DVD documents that the cast and crew survived bitterly cold temperatures of below −50 °F (−46 °C) in Manitoba, which sometimes resulted in malfunctions of cameras and other equipment.

== Soundtrack ==
Songs featured in the film:

- Perk Badger – "Do Your Stuff"
- Donavon Frankenreiter – "Move by Yourself"
- APM Music – "I'm Movin' Out"
- T-Rex – "20th Century Boy"
- Katrina and the Waves – "Walking on Sunshine"
- Renée Zellweger – "I Will Survive"
- Crit Harmon – "Boss Of Everything"
- Missy Higgins – "Steer"
- Elizabeth & The Catapult – "Race You"
- Brittini Black – "Life Is Good"
- Craig N. Cisco – "On The Other Side"
- Tift Merritt – "Another Country"
- Marty Jensen – "Just Because We're Over"
- Carrie Underwood – "That's Where It Is"
- Moot Davis – "In The Thick Of It"
- Natalia Safran – "Hey You" (featuring Mikolaj Jaroszyk)
