= The Devil Wears Prada (film) =

2006 film by David Frankel

- Theatrical release poster
- Directed by: David Frankel
- Screenplay by: Aline Brosh McKenna
- Based on: The Devil Wears Prada by Lauren Weisberger
- Produced by: Wendy Finerman
- Starring: Meryl Streep; Anne Hathaway; Stanley Tucci; Simon Baker; Emily Blunt; Adrian Grenier
- Cinematography: Florian Ballhaus
- Edited by: Mark Livolsi
- Music by: Theodore Shapiro
- Production companies: Fox 2000 Pictures; Wendy Finerman Productions
- Distributed by: 20th Century Fox
- Release dates: June 22, 2006 (LA Film Festival); June 30, 2006 (United States)
- Running time: 109 minutes
- Country: United States
- Language: English
- Budget: $35–41 million
- Box office: $327 million

The Devil Wears Prada is a 2006 American comedy-drama film directed by David Frankel and produced by Wendy Finerman. The screenplay, written by Aline Brosh McKenna, is based on the 2003 novel by Lauren Weisberger. The film stars Meryl Streep, Anne Hathaway, Stanley Tucci, and Emily Blunt. It follows Andy Sachs (Hathaway), an aspiring journalist who gets a job at a fashion magazine but finds herself at the mercy of her demanding editor, Miranda Priestly (Streep).

20th Century Fox bought the rights to a film adaptation of Weisberger's novel in 2003, before it was completed, but the project was not greenlit until Streep was cast. Principal photography lasted 57 days across September to December 2005, primarily taking place in New York City. Additional filming took place in Paris.

The Devil Wears Prada premiered at the LA Film Festival on June 22, 2006, and was theatrically released in the United States on June 30. It received positive reviews, particularly for Streep's performance; she won the Golden Globe Award for Best Actress – Motion Picture Musical or Comedy and was nominated as Best Lead Actress for the Academy Award, BAFTA Award, SAG, and Critics' Choice. The film grossed $327 million worldwide against a budget of $35–41 million. A sequel, The Devil Wears Prada 2, was released in May 2026.

Most designers and other fashion figures avoided appearing as themselves, reportedly for fear of displeasing the American Vogue editor Anna Wintour, who is widely believed to have been the inspiration for the character of Miranda Priestly. However, Wintour stated she enjoyed the film and Streep's performance in particular.

== Plot ==
Aspiring journalist Andrea "Andy" Sachs has recently graduated from Northwestern University. Despite her lack of knowledge of the fashion industry, she is hired as a junior personal assistant to Miranda Priestly, the cruel editor-in-chief of Runway magazine in New York City. Andy resolves to tolerate Miranda's abusive treatment until she can use her connections from Runway to find a journalism-focused job.

Andy fits in poorly with her superficial, fashion-forward co-workers, particularly Miranda's British senior assistant, Emily Charlton, and struggles to meet Miranda's irrational demands. After she fails to arrange for Miranda to be flown back from Miami during a hurricane, she is berated. She then approaches Runway's art director Nigel for advice, and he helps her select stylish clothes to fit the extremely fashion-conscious workplace.

Noticing Andy's increased commitment to the job, Miranda delegates more important tasks to her. Andy soon outperforms Emily, who yearns to attend Paris Fashion Week as Miranda's assistant. In preparation for the event, Emily follows extreme diets that endanger her health.

When Emily arrives to work sick and forgets the names of important guests at a charity benefit, Andy steps in to save Miranda from embarrassment. Miranda subsequently selects Andy to accompany her to Paris Fashion Week. Emily is horrified that Andy accepted Miranda's offer. After Andy snaps at her boyfriend Nate, who is disappointed that she has become one of the shallow, egotistical women she once ridiculed, they break up with each other in the street.

In Paris, Andy learns that Miranda's husband has filed for divorce. Later that night, Nigel tells Andy that he has accepted a job as creative director for rising designer James Holt. Andy spends the night with an attractive writer, Christian Thompson, who tells her that Jacqueline Follet (Miranda's counterpart as editor-in-chief at French Runway) is being prepared to replace Miranda. Andy attempts to warn Miranda, who dismisses her.

At a luncheon, Miranda announces Jacqueline as Holt's new creative director and later reveals that she already knew of the scheme to replace her and sacrificed Nigel's ambitions to preserve her own job. Andy is repulsed by Miranda's betrayal of her friend, but Miranda points out that Andy did the same thing to Emily. Afraid to become the type of person Miranda is, Andy storms off. When Miranda tries calling her, Andy tosses her phone into the Fontaines de la Concorde.

Back in New York, Andy meets up with Nate, who tells her he has a new job as a sous-chef in Boston, and they agree to keep in touch. The same day, Andy has an interview at the New York Mirror newspaper. The editor recounts that when he called Runway for a reference, Miranda told him that Andy was the biggest disappointment she had ever had as an assistant and that he would be an idiot not to hire her.

After getting the job, Andy calls Emily and offers her the clothes she obtained in Paris. While walking past the Runway office building, Andy sees Miranda and waves at her. Miranda does not acknowledge her but smiles to herself once seated in her car.

== Cast ==
- Meryl Streep as Miranda Priestly, the editor-in-chief of Runway magazine (based on Anna Wintour)
- Anne Hathaway as Andrea "Andy" Sachs, an aspiring journalist and Miranda's second assistant (based on Lauren Weisberger)
- Emily Blunt as Emily Charlton, Miranda's first assistant (based on Leslie Fremar)
- Stanley Tucci as Nigel Kipling, Runway's fashion director who develops a mentor-like relationship with Andy
- Simon Baker as Christian Thompson, a well-known journalist who pursues Andy
- Adrian Grenier as Nate Cooper, Andy's boyfriend
- David Marshall Grant as Richard Sachs, Andy's father
- James Naughton as Stephen, Miranda's husband
- Tracie Thoms as Lily, Andy's friend
- Daniel Sunjata as James Holt, a fashion designer
- Rebecca Mader as Jocelyn, a Runway editor
- Rich Sommer as Doug, Andy's friend
- Tibor Feldman as Irv Ravitz, Runway chairman
- Jimena Hoyos as Lucia, a Runway editor
- Gisele Bündchen as Serena, a Runway staff member
- John Rothman as Greg Hill, an editor at the New York Mirror
- Stéphanie Szostak as Jacqueline Follet, the editor-in-chief of the French edition of Runway
- Colleen Dengel as Caroline Priestly, Miranda's daughter and Cassidy's identical twin sister
- Suzanne Dengel as Cassidy Priestly, Miranda's daughter and Caroline's identical twin sister
- Ines Rivero as clacker in elevator
- Alyssa Sutherland as clacker
- Paul Keany as St. Regis butler
- David Callegati as Massimo, an Italian designer

Heidi Klum, Valentino Garavani, and Bridget Hall cameo as themselves. Robert Verdi appears as a fashion journalist in Paris who interviews Miranda, while uncredited appearances include Giancarlo Giammetti, original novel author Lauren Weisberger as the twins' nanny, and Nigel Barker.

== Production ==
Fox bought the rights to Weisberger's novel before the book's prose was finished. Carla Hacken, then the studio's executive vice president, had only seen the first hundred pages of the manuscript and an outline for the rest of the plot. Director David Frankel and producer Wendy Finerman had read The Devil Wears Prada in book proposal form. Frankel recalls the experience as having high stakes, since it was the biggest project they had yet attempted, with barely adequate resources.

Weisberger is believed to have based Miranda on Anna Wintour, the editor in chief of Vogue, for whom she herself had once worked as a personal assistant. Fear of what Wintour might do in retribution for any visible cooperation with the production posed obstacles in the fashion industry and the film industry.

=== Writing ===
When the book became a bestseller, elements of the plot were incorporated into the screenplay. Most took their inspiration from the 2001 Ben Stiller film Zoolander, satirizing the fashion industry. David Frankel was hired as director despite his limited experience, having only made one feature, Miami Rhapsody, and episodes of Sex and the City and Entourage. He cited Unzipped, the 1995 documentary about designer Isaac Mizrahi, as his model for the film's attitude towards fashion, both silly and serious.

At a meeting with Finerman, Frankel said he thought the story unnecessarily punished Miranda. He prepared to move on and consider more scripts. Two days later, his manager persuaded him to reconsider and look for something he liked that he could shape the film into. He took the job, giving Finerman extensive notes on the script and laying out a detailed vision for the film.

Four screenwriters worked on the property. Peter Hedges wrote the first draft, another writer passed. Paul Rudnick did some work on Miranda's scenes, followed by a Don Roos rewrite. Aline Brosh McKenna, who related her own youthful experiences to the story, produced a draft that struck a balance for Finerman and Frankel, whose notes were incorporated into a final version, rearranging the plot significantly, and focusing the story on the conflict between Andy and Miranda. McKenna toned down Miranda's meanness at Finerman and Frankel's request, only to restore it for Streep. She cited Don Rickles as her main influence for the insults. McKenna consulted with fashion acquaintances to make her screenplay more realistic, made difficult since they did not want to offend Wintour. Weisberger stated that McKenna's draft took it away from the "typical chick flick" direction it was going in.

=== Cerulean sweater speech ===
The cerulean sweater speech

In the "cerulean speech", Miranda links the designer fashion in Runway's pages and Andy's cerulean blue sweater, criticizing Andy's snobbishness about fashion. Streep said that the scene was about marketing and business. (Note: In a paper comparing the film's plot to the Psyche myth, the scholar Janet Brennan Croft says the speech "subverts the idea that fashion, the ultimate in feminine work, is trivial", a presupposition of Andy's it is Miranda's role to correct, as it is for Aphrodite in the original myth and similar mother-mentor characters in other "heroine's journey" narratives: "Miranda's monologue on the color of Andy’s 'lumpy blue sweater and its place in a vast economic web (which she is quite frank about personally controlling) celebrates feminine power.") McKenna recalls that she expanded it to suit Streep and Frankel. The speech became one of the film's most memorable moments. Morwenna Ferrier, in The Guardian, agreed that fashion mattered, even to people who claim to be "oblivious to trends". Mic wrote that the speech functioned as a critique of cultural appropriation.

=== "Florals? For spring? Groundbreaking!" ===
Miranda's sarcastic response to Jocelyn's story suggestion for the floral spring prints has been considered the film's best line. McKenna wrote the scene with Streep in mind. It was written "florals." and "spring." Streep spoke them with a slight rising intonation, as if they ended in question marks. McKenna sees Streep's way of saying "florals" has the same resonance for her as the earlier line "By all means move at a glacial pace; you know that thrills me." "It just punches you in the face ever so lightly, slowly ruining your self-esteem."

=== Casting ===
Michelle Pfeiffer, Glenn Close, and Catherine Zeta-Jones were considered for the role of Miranda. Streep was almost passed over because people thought she was not funny. Her casting helped offset the difficulties Wintour's resistance to the film had created. Streep felt the pay she was initially offered for the role was too low. The producers doubled it to around $4 million, and she signed on, allowing Fox to greenlight the film.

For Andy, Fox wanted a young A-list actress, and felt Rachel McAdams, then coming off successes in Mean Girls and The Notebook, would help the film's commercial prospects. McAdams turned down several offers to play Andy. Kate Hudson was offered the role but declined due to scheduling conflicts with You, Me and Dupree. Kirsten Dunst, Natalie Portman, and Scarlett Johansson were considered. Anne Hathaway actively sought the part, tracing "Hire me" in the sand of the zen garden on Hacken's desk when she talked about the project with the executive. While Frankel liked her enough not to require her to audition, she thought she was not the studio's first choice and he would have to be patient.

Over 100 actresses were considered for Emily before a casting agent taped Emily Blunt reading some of the lines elsewhere on the Fox lot after her audition for Eragon. She read them in her own British accent which interested Frankel as he liked her sense of humor. After the makers of Eragon cast Sienna Guillory, Frankel called Blunt, saying that while he would have cast her just from the tape, the studio wanted to see another audition with her dressed more in character. She insisted on continuing to play the character as British.

Tucci agreed to play Nigel only three days before shooting started. The filmmakers had auditioned Barney's creative director Simon Doonan and E!'s Robert Verdi, both openly gay men highly visible as media fashion commentators. The BBC's Graham Norton also auditioned, in addition to 150 other actors. Verdi said there was no intention to hire him and the producers had just used him and Doonan to give whoever they ultimately did cast some filmed research to use in playing a gay character; Tucci says he was unaware of this. He based the character on various people he was acquainted with, insisting on the glasses he ultimately wore.

Daniel Sunjata had read unenthusiastically for Tucci's part, but then read the Holt part and asked if he could audition for it. Simon Baker auditioned by sending a video of himself, wearing the same self-designed green jacket he has on when he and Andy meet for the first time. Colleen and Suzanne Dengel, who played Miranda's daughters, were cast two weeks after auditioning for Frankel and Finerman.

Wintour reportedly warned major fashion designers that they would be banished from the magazine if they appeared in the film; Wintour's spokespeople deny the claim. Designers instead helped the production with background information. Valentino Garavani, who designed the black evening gown Miranda wears during the museum benefit scene, made an appearance; he was in New York City during production and Finerman dared costume designer Patricia Field, an acquaintance of the designer, to ask him personally to appear in the film. Other cameos include Heidi Klum as herself and Weisberger as the twins' nanny. Gisele Bündchen agreed to appear if she did not play a model.

=== Filming ===
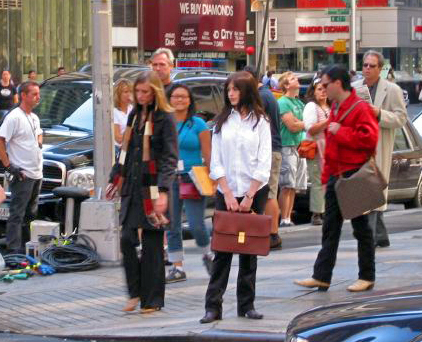
Anne Hathaway between takes while shooting a scene in Midtown Manhattan

Principal photography took place over 57 days in New York and Paris, starting on September 17, 2005 and finishing mid-December 2005. The film's budget was initially $35 million and was to only include filming in New York. The co-op boards at many apartment buildings refused to let the production use them as Miranda's, because of Wintour's influence. Ballhaus composed many shots to take in busy New York street scenes as background, to convey the glamour of the industry. He used a handheld camera in Miranda's office, to better convey the flow of action, and slow motion for Andrea's entrance after her makeover. After six weeks, Frankel persuaded the studio to budget for limited shooting in Paris, but to save money, Streep did not go.

=== Acting ===
The actors gathered in New York for a table read. Hathaway was nervous but Blunt found Streep's laugh relaxed her enough to keep her focused on playing a nervous, distracted Emily. The highlight of the session was Streep's first line as Miranda, where she silenced the room by speaking in a near whisper. Devil was Streep's only film to use a Method approach, staying in character between takes. She did not play a direct impression of Wintour. The "that's all," "please bore someone else …" catchphrases; her coat-tossing on Andrea's desk and discarded steak lunch are retained from the novel. Streep lost so much weight during shooting that her clothes had to be taken in. In 2016, she told Variety that she took Miranda's soft speaking style from Clint Eastwood, and her joking from director Mike Nichols. "The walk, I'm afraid, is mine", Streep added.

Inspirations for Miranda's hair

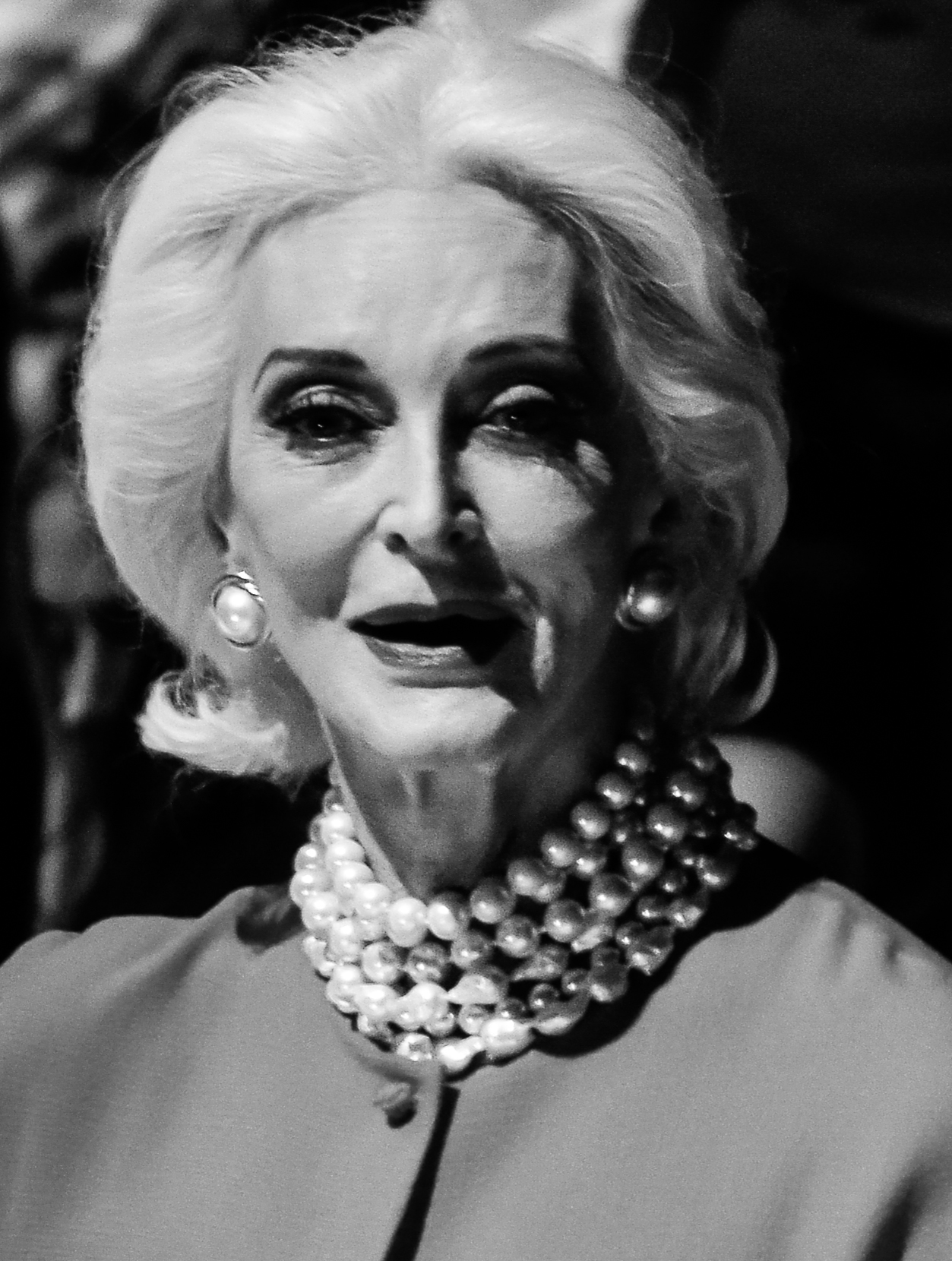
Carmen Dell'Orefice

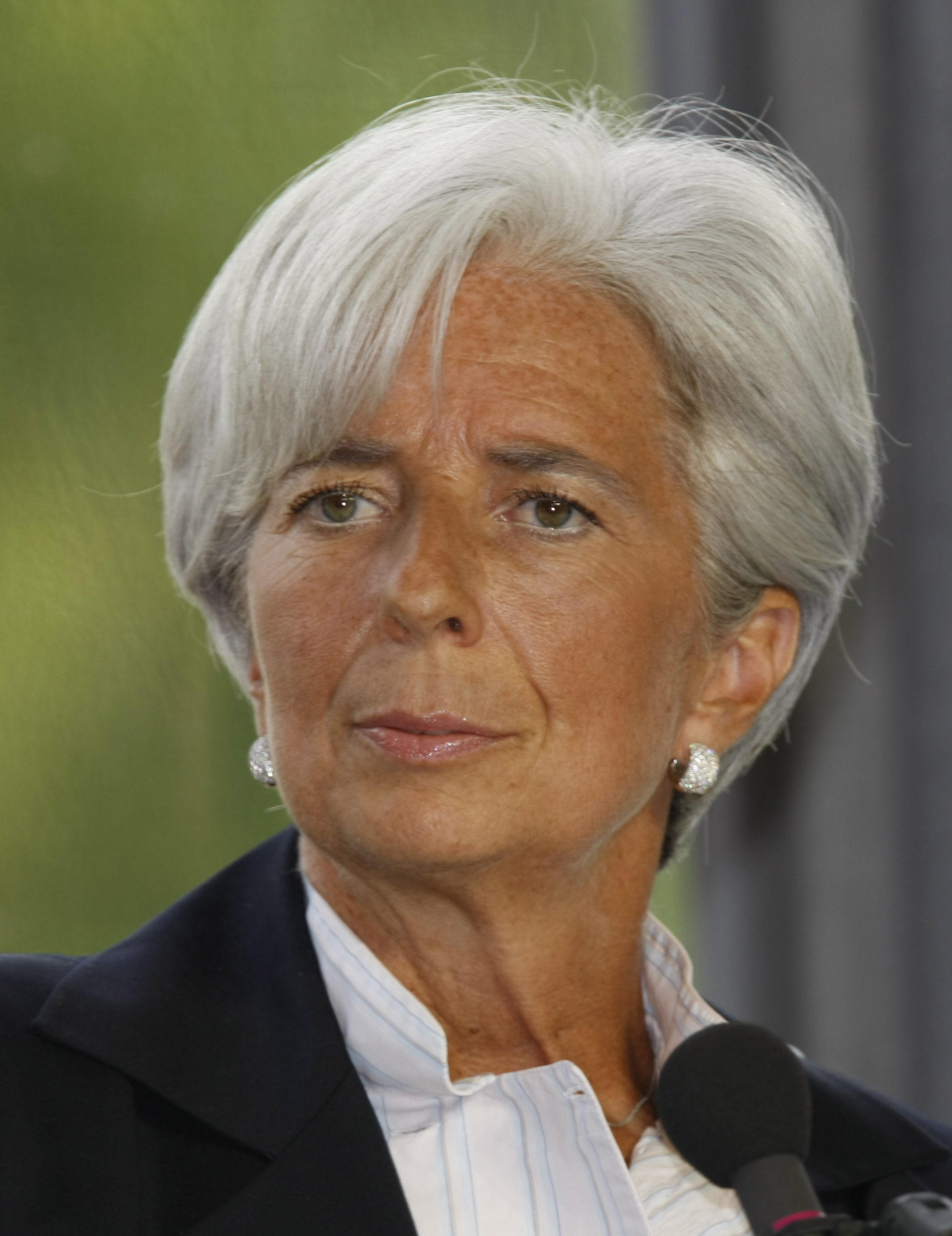
Christine Lagarde

For Miranda's look, the bouffant hairstyle was inspired by actress Carmen Dell'Orefice, blended with "the unassailable elegance and authority of [French politician] Christine Lagarde". She wanted Miranda's hair to be white, which the producers feared would make her look too old, but the studio trusted her. When McKenna saw Streep as Miranda for the first time on set, she recalls being so terrified she threw her arm in front of Frankel "like we were in a car wreck". Hathaway prepared for her part by volunteering for a week as an assistant at an auction house. The director said she was "terrified" before starting her first scene with Streep, who had begun her working relationship with Hathaway by saying first "I think you're perfect for the role and I'm so happy we're going to be working on this together", then warning her that was the last nice thing she would say. The scene where Andy delivers the Book, the mockup of the magazine in progress, was, according to the Dengels totally improvised.

=== Costuming ===
Frankel knew that what the cast wore would be of utmost importance. Streep recalled that the fashion industry "was afraid of Anna [Wintour], so we couldn't find any clothes". While only Valentino Garavani appeared onscreen, many other designers assisted. Frankel recalls that Prada's decision to assist Field "helped her break the ice".

The $100,000 budget for costumes was supplemented by help from Field's industry friends, she estimated that a million dollars of clothing appeared on screen. The single priciest item was Streep's $100,000 Fred Leighton necklace, who likened Field's wardrobe success to the special effects in the Mission: Impossible films.

When Hathaway enters after Nigel gives her access to Runway's closet, she is dressed entirely in Chanel. Field explained that she felt Hathaway "was a Chanel girl organically", and the company were delighted to help with her younger image. Most of the garments onscreen were borrowed; Streep could not eat spaghetti at lunch in one dress so it could be returned clean.

Dolce & Gabbana and Calvin Klein helped Field with contributions from Lebanese designer Georges Chakra. Although Field avoids making Streep look like Wintour, she dresses her in plenty of Prada. Field said she did not want people to easily recognize what Miranda was wearing. But, like Wintour and her Vogue predecessor Diana Vreeland, the two gave Miranda a signature look with her white wig and forelock.

Blunt and Streep wore their outfit shoes only when they were shown in full, wearing more comfortable footwear like Uggs the rest of the time. Hathaway always wore whatever shoes she had been given. "[She was running] over cobblestone streets like a sure-footed little mountain goat", Blunt recalls.

Emily Blunt in the look Field created for her character

Field contrasted Andy and Emily by giving Andy a sense of low-risk style that would suggest clothing a fashion magazine would have on hand for shoots. Blunt, on the other hand was "so on the edge she's almost falling off". For her, Field chose pieces by Vivienne Westwood and Rick Owens to suggest a taste for funkier, more "underground" clothing. After the film's release, some of the looks became popular, to the filmmakers' amusement. Tucci praised Field's skill in putting ensembles together that were not only stylish but subtly helped him develop his character. Tucci found one Dries van Noten tie he wore during the film to his liking and kept it.

=== Production design ===
After touring fashion magazine offices, Jess Gonchor gave the Runway offices a clean, white look meant to suggest a makeup compact. Miranda's office resembles Wintour's, down to an octagonal mirror, photographs and a floral arrangement on the desk. Gonchor told Women's Wear Daily that he had based the set on an online photo of Wintour's office, Wintour had her office redecorated after the movie's release. In 2021, Frankel said Gonchor had managed to sneak into Vogue's offices to get a look at Wintour's. "They got it really, really close", Weisberger said. Gonchor chose separate computer wallpaper to highlight different aspects of Blunt's and Hathaway's characters: Paris's Arc de Triomphe on Blunt's suggests her aspirations to accompany Miranda to the shows there, while Andy's floral image suggests the natural, unassuming qualities she displays as she begins with the magazine. For the photo of Andy with her parents, Hathaway posed with her own mother and David Marshall Grant. The Dengel twins said they were asked every day for three years if the Harry Potter advance copies were real, but they were "all gibberish". They auctioned them for $586 on eBay, along with clothing used in the film, to benefit the Dress for Success charity.

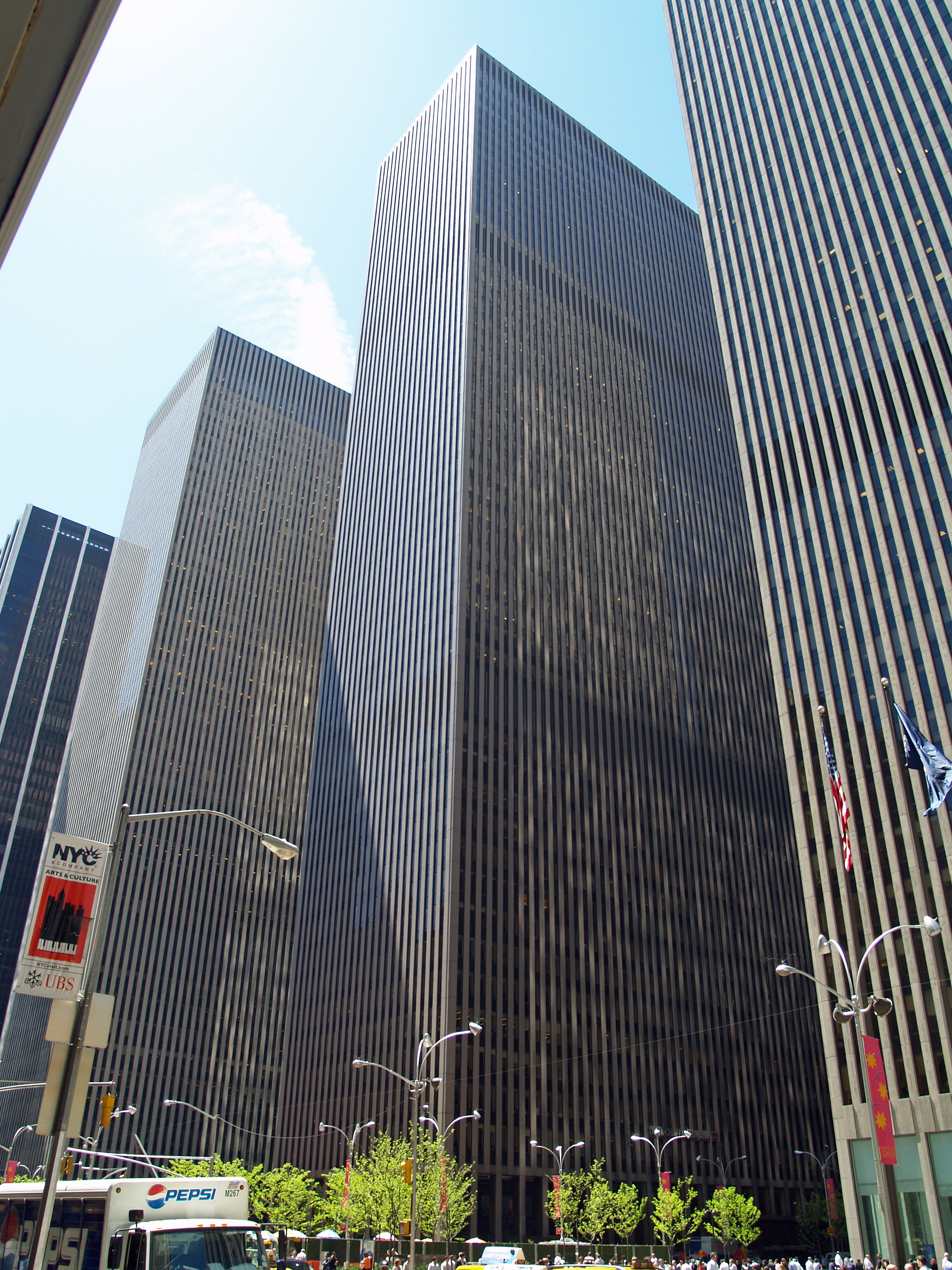
The 1221 Avenue of the Americas, home to Elias-Clarke in the film

=== Locations ===
Many of the locations are in New York, including the Reuters cafeteria in Manhattan, while Nate and Andy's apartment is on the Lower East Side, and Andy gets on the subway at the Spring Street station and gets off at 51st Street. The Smith & Wollensky steakhouse and its kitchen were used, while Holt's studio is a loft used by an actual designer. The American Museum of Natural History was used for the exterior of the museum benefit, while the lobby of a Foley Square courthouse is used for the interior. The New York Mirror newsroom where Andy gets hired at the end of the film is that of the now-defunct New York Sun.

The crew were in Paris for only two days, and used only exteriors. Streep did not make the trip. All the hotel interiors are the St. Regis in Manhattan. The fashion shows were filmed on a soundstage in Queens. Likewise, Christian's hotel is the W Hotel at Times Square.

=== Editing ===
Mark Livolsi realized, as McKenna had on the other end, that the film worked best when it focused on the Andrea-Miranda storyline. Accordingly, he cut a number of primarily transitional scenes, such as Andrea's job interview and the Runway staff's trip to Holt's studio. He took out a scene early on where Miranda complimented Andrea. Upon reviewing them for the DVD, Frankel admitted he had not even seen them before, since Livolsi did not include them in any prints he sent to the director.

Frankel praised Livolsi for making the film's four key montages—the opening credits, Miranda's coat-tossing, Andrea's makeover and the Paris introduction—work. The third was particularly challenging as it uses passing cars and other obstructions to cover Hathaway's changes of outfit. Some scenes were created in the editing room, such as the reception at the museum, where Livolsi wove B-roll footage in to keep the action flowing.

In 2021 McKenna estimated that she had signed off on $10 million in cut scenes. An opening scene in which Andy goes to the wrong building on her way to her interview was taken out to get the story started more quickly. The scene where she misses Nate's birthday was originally more elaborate, with the couple supposed to meet up with their friends at a concert, but that proved to be too expensive, and so the scene with the cupcake was written instead. "We had many versions of that". And an alternate ending for the couple's arc, where they have the same conversation about the future of their relationship while running through the park, was filmed but replaced with the less optimistic scene in the restaurant.

== Soundtrack ==
Composer Theodore Shapiro relied heavily on guitar and percussion, with the backing of a full orchestra, to capture a contemporary urban sound. He ultimately wrote 35 minutes of music for the film, which were performed and recorded by the Hollywood Studio Symphony, conducted by Pete Anthony. His work was balanced with songs by U2 ("City of Blinding Lights", Miranda and Andy in Paris), Madonna ("Vogue" and "Jump", Andrea's fashion montage and her first day on the job, respectively), KT Tunstall ("Suddenly I See", female montage during opening credits), Alanis Morissette ("Crazy", Central Park photo shoot), Bitter:Sweet ("Our Remains", Andy picks up James Holt's sketches for Miranda, "Bittersweet Faith", Lily's art show), Azure Ray ("Sleep", following the breakdown of her relationship with Nate), Jamiroquai ("Seven Days in Sunny June", Andy and Christian meet at James Holt's party) among others. Frankel had wanted to use "City of Blinding Lights" in the film after he had used it as a soundtrack to a video montage of Paris scenes he had put together after scouting locations there. Likewise, Field had advocated just as strongly for "Vogue".

The soundtrack album was released on July 11, 2006, by Warner Music. It includes most of the songs mentioned above, as well as a suite of Shapiro's themes. Among the tracks not included is "Suddenly I See", an omission which disappointed many fans.

== Pre-release and marketing ==
Originally intended just to convince Fox to fund some shooting in Paris, Frankel's sizzle reel led the studio to put a stronger marketing push behind the movie. It moved the release date from February to summer, scheduling it as a lighter alternative audiences could consider to Superman Returns at the end of June 2006, and began to position it as an event movie in and of itself.

Two decisions by the studio's marketing department that were meant to be preliminary wound up being integral to promoting the film. The first was the creation of the red stiletto heel ending in a pitchfork as the film's teaser poster. It was so successful and effective, becoming almost "iconic" (in Finerman's words), that it was used for the actual release poster as well. It became a brand, and was eventually used on every medium related to the film—the tie-in reprinting of the novel and the soundtrack and DVD covers as well.

The studio put together a trailer of scenes and images from the first three minutes of the film, in which Andy meets Miranda for the first time, to be used at previews and film festivals until they could create a more standard trailer drawing from the whole film. But, again, this proved so effective with early audiences it was retained as the main trailer, since it created anticipation for the rest of the film without giving anything away.

Gabler credits the studio's marketing team for being "really creative". Fox saw the film as "counter-programming" on the weekend Superman Returns was released. While they knew that the material and Hathaway would help draw a younger female audience that would not be as interested in seeing that film, "we didn't want it to just seem like a chick flick coming out".

== Reception ==
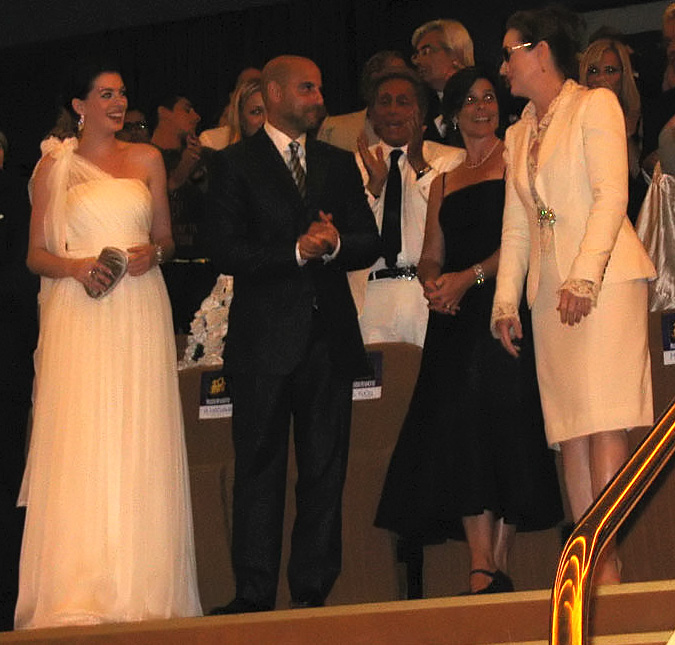
The stars of The Devil Wears Prada at the Venice premiere, front row: (left to right) Anne Hathaway, Stanley Tucci, Kate Tucci and Meryl Streep. Valentino can be seen behind and between Stanley and Kate Tucci, and Beatrice Borromeo is partly visible to Stanley Tucci's left.

=== Critical response ===
The Devil Wears Prada received positive reviews from critics. On the review aggregator website Rotten Tomatoes, 75% of 196 critics' reviews are positive, with an average rating of 6.9/10. The website's consensus reads: "A rare film that surpasses the quality of its source novel, this Devil is a witty expose of New York's fashion scene, with Meryl Streep in top form and Anne Hathaway more than holding her own." On Metacritic, the film has a weighted average score of 62 out of 100, based on 40 critics, indicating "generally favorable reviews". Audiences surveyed by CinemaScore gave the film an average grade "B" on an A+ to F scale.

Initial reviews of the film focused primarily on Streep's performance, praising her for making an extremely unsympathetic character far more complex than she had been in the novel. "With her silver hair and pale skin, her whispery diction as perfect as her posture, Ms. Streep's Miranda inspires both terror and a measure of awe", wrote A. O. Scott in The New York Times. "No longer simply the incarnation of evil, she is now a vision of aristocratic, purposeful and surprisingly human grace".

David Edelstein, in New York magazine, criticized the film as "thin", but praised Streep for her "fabulous minimalist performance". J. Hoberman, Edelstein's onetime colleague at The Village Voice, called the movie an improvement on the book and said Streep was "the scariest, most nuanced, funniest movie villainess since Tilda Swinton's nazified White Witch in The Chronicles of Narnia: The Lion, the Witch and the Wardrobe.

Blunt, too, earned some favorable notice. "[She] has many of the movie's best lines and steals nearly every scene she's in", wrote Clifford Pugh in the Houston Chronicle. Other reviewers and fans concurred. While all critics were in agreement about Streep and Blunt, they pointed to other weaknesses, particularly in the story. Reviewers familiar with Weisberger's novel assented to her judgment that McKenna's script greatly improved upon it. An exception was Angela Baldassare at The Microsoft Network Canada, who felt the film needed more of the nastiness others had told her was abundant in the novel.

Some reviews characterized the film as shallow or lacking thematic depth, emphasizing its surface glamour over its commentary on work, ambition, and power. David Denby in The New Yorker wrote "The Devil Wears Prada tells a familiar story, and it never goes much below the surface of what it has to tell. Still, what a surface!" Denby said Hathaway "suggests, with no more than a panicky sidelong glance, what Weisberger takes pages to describe", whereas Baldassare said she "barely carrie[d] the load".

=== Depiction of fashion industry ===
Some media outlets allowed their fashion reporters to comment on the movie. Booth Moore at Los Angeles Times chided Field for creating a "fine fashion fantasy with little to do with reality". She said that fashionistas were less likely to wear makeup and more likely to value edgier dressing styles (not including toe rings). Field replied that it was not a documentary. Fashion writer Hadley Freeman of The Guardian complained the film was awash in the sexism and clichés. Charla Krupp, executive editor of SHOP, Inc., wrote, "It's the first film I've seen that got it right… [It] has the nuances of the politics and the tension better than any film—and the backstabbing and sucking-up". Joanna Coles, the editor of the U.S. edition of Marie Claire, agreed that it "brilliantly skewers a particular kind of young woman who lives, breathes, thinks fashion above all else". Ginia Bellefante, in The New York Times, called it "easily the truest portrayal of fashion culture since Unzipped (1995)". Her colleague Ruth La Ferla reported that industry insiders found the fashion in the movie too safe and the beauty too overstated.

=== Commercial ===
On its June 30 opening weekend, right before the Independence Day holiday, the film was on 2,847 screens. Through that Sunday, July 2, it grossed $27 million, second only to the big-budget Superman Returns, breaking The Patriot's six-year-old record for the largest take by a movie released that holiday weekend that did not win the weekend, a record that stood until Ice Age: Dawn of the Dinosaurs broke it in 2009.

During its first week it added $13 million. This led Fox to add 35 more screens the next weekend, the widest domestic distribution the film enjoyed. Although it was never any week's top-grossing film, it remained in the top 10 through July. Its theatrical run continued through December 10, shortly before the DVD release.

"The core marketing was definitely to women", Gabler recalls, "but the men didn't resist going to the movie". She felt that male viewers responded favorably because they sought a glimpse inside fashion, and because Miranda "was enjoyable to watch". The release date helped generate word of mouth at holiday gatherings. "They were talking about it, like a summer reading book", said Gabler.

It had a successful run in theaters, earning $125 million in the United States and Canada and $327 million worldwide, a career-high for all three top-billed actresses at that time. Streep would surpass it two years later with Mamma Mia while Hathaway exceeded it in 2010 with Alice in Wonderland. (Note: In 2008, Get Smart outdid Devil's domestic box office but took in far less overseas.) Blunt would not be in a higher-grossing film until 2014 with Edge of Tomorrow. (Note: Later that year, the movie adaptation of the Broadway musical Into the Woods (also starring Streep) outdid Devil's domestic box office but took in far less overseas.) It was Tucci's highest-grossing film until Captain America: The First Avenger (2011).

=== Anna Wintour ===
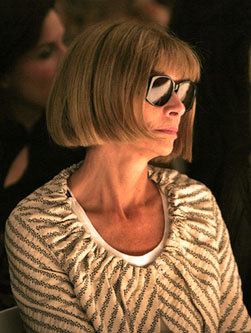
Anna Wintour, on whom Miranda is supposedly based, was at first skeptical of the film but later came to appreciate it.

Anna Wintour attended the film's New York premiere, wearing Prada. Her friend Barbara Amiel reported her as saying that the movie would go straight to DVD. Frankel recalled that Wintour's daughter kept telling her mother that the film got many things right. In an interview with Barbara Walters, Wintour called the film "really entertaining" and said she appreciated the "decisive" nature of Streep's portrayal. Streep said Wintour was "probably more upset by the book than the film". Wintour's popularity skyrocketed after her portrayal in the film. Streep said she did not base her character on Wintour, but had been inspired by men she had known. Frankel said that at a Miami tennis tournament after the film's release, Wintour refused to shake his hand. In 2025, Wintour stated, "I went to see the film, and I found it highly enjoyable. It was very funny. It had a lot of humor to it. It had a lot of wit. It had Meryl Streep. I mean, it was Emily Blunt, [and] they were all amazing. In the end, I thought it was a fair shot". Streep and Wintour appeared together on the cover of Vogue in 2026 to promote The Devil Wears Prada 2.

=== International ===
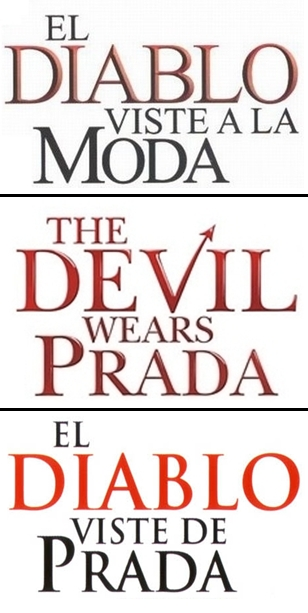
From top-down: the movie title logo for Latin America, English-language regions and Spain (in the same typeface as that used on the poster).

Weisberger's novel has been translated into 37 languages, giving the movie a strong potential foreign audience. The international box office delivered 60% of the film's gross. "We did our European premiere at the Venice Film Festival", Gabler says, where the city's gondoliers wore red T-shirts with the film's logo. "So many people around the world were captivated by the glossy fashion world. It was sexy and international".

The film topped the charts on its European release on October 9. It was the highest-grossing film that weekend in the United Kingdom, Spain and Russia, taking in $41.5 million. It opened strongly across the rest of Europe, helping it remain atop the overseas charts the whole month. It opened in China at the end of February 2007, taking $2.4 million. The greatest portion of the $201.8 million total international box office came from the United Kingdom, with $26.5 million, followed by Germany with $23.1 million, Italy at $19.3 million and France at $17.9 million. Beyond Europe, the Japanese box office was the highest, at $14.6 million, followed by Australia, at $12.6 million.

Most reviews from the international press praised Streep and the other actors, but called the film "predictable". The Guardian's Peter Bradshaw, who found the film "moderately entertaining", took Blunt to task, calling her a "real disappointment… strained and awkward". In The Independent, Anthony Quinn said Streep "may just have given us a classic here" and concluded that the film was "as snappy and juicy as fresh bubblegum".

== Accolades ==
In October 2006, Frankel and Weisberger accepted the first Quill Variety Blockbuster Book to Film Award. A committee at the magazine made the nominations and chose the award winner. Editor Peter Bart praised both works, saying that "The Devil Wears Prada is an energetically directed, perfect-fit of a film". The film was honored by the National Board of Review as one of the year's ten best. The American Film Institute gave the film similar recognition. At the Golden Globe Award nominations, the film was in the running for Best Picture (Comedy/Musical) and Supporting Actress (for Blunt). Streep won the Globe for Best Actress (Musical/Comedy). In January 2007, Streep's was nominated for Best Actress by the Screen Actors Guild. At the National Society of Film Critics awards, Streep won Best Supporting Actress both for Devil and A Prairie Home Companion. McKenna earned a nomination from the Writers Guild of America Award for Best Adapted Screenplay. Blunt, Field, McKenna and Streep were among the nominees for the British Academy of Film and Television Arts awards, along with makeup artist and hairstylists Nicki Ledermann and Angel de Angelis. Streep received her 14th Academy Award nomination for Best Actress. Field received a Best Costume Design nomination.

Award	Date of ceremony	Category	Recipient(s)	Result
Academy Awards	February 25, 2007	Best Actress	Meryl Streep	Nominated
Academy Awards	February 25, 2007	Best Costume Design	Patricia Field	Nominated
ACE Eddie Awards	February 18, 2007	Best Edited Feature Film – Comedy or Musical	Mark Livolsi	Nominated
AFI Awards	January 12, 2007	Movie of the Year	The Devil Wears Prada	Won
African-American Film Critics Association Awards	December 22, 2006	Top 10 Films	The Devil Wears Prada	Won
Alliance of Women Film Journalists' EDA Awards	December 2006	Best Comedy by or About Women	David Frankel	Nominated
Alliance of Women Film Journalists' EDA Awards	December 2006	Best Actress in a Comedic Performance	Meryl Streep	Won
Alliance of Women Film Journalists' EDA Awards	December 2006	Best Screenplay Written by a Woman	Aline Brosh McKenna	Nominated
Awards Circuit Community Awards	December 2006	Best Actress in a Leading Role	Meryl Streep	Nominated
Awards Circuit Community Awards	December 2006	Best Actress in a Supporting Role	Emily Blunt	Nominated
BMI Film & TV Awards	May 16, 2007	BMI Film Music	Theodore Shapiro	Won
Boston Society of Film Critics Awards	December 11, 2006	Boston Society of Film Critics Award for Best Supporting Actress	Meryl Streep	Nominated
British Academy Film Awards	February 11, 2007	Best Actress in a Leading Role	Meryl Streep	Nominated
British Academy Film Awards	February 11, 2007	Best Actress in a Supporting Role	Emily Blunt	Nominated
British Academy Film Awards	February 11, 2007	Best Adapted Screenplay	Aline Brosh McKenna	Nominated
British Academy Film Awards	February 11, 2007	Best Costume Design	Patricia Field	Nominated
British Academy Film Awards	February 11, 2007	Best Makeup and Hair	Nicki Ledermann; Angel De Angelis	Nominated
Central Ohio Film Critics Association Awards	January 11, 2007	Best Actress	Meryl Streep	Nominated
Chicago Film Critics Association Awards	December 28, 2006	Best Actress	Meryl Streep	Nominated
Costume Designers Guild Awards	February 17, 2007	Excellence in Costume Design for a Contemporary Film	Patricia Field	Nominated
Critics' Choice Awards	January 20, 2007	Best Comedy	The Devil Wears Prada	Nominated
Critics' Choice Awards	January 20, 2007	Best Actress	Meryl Streep	Nominated
Dallas–Fort Worth Film Critics Association Awards	December 19, 2006	Dallas–Fort Worth Film Critics Association Award for Best Actress	Meryl Streep	Nominated
Dallas–Fort Worth Film Critics Association Awards	December 19, 2006	Dallas–Fort Worth Film Critics Association Award for Best Supporting Actress	Emily Blunt	Nominated
Dublin Film Critics' Circle Awards	December 2006	Best Supporting Actress	Meryl Streep	Nominated
Golden Globe Awards	January 15, 2007	Best Motion Picture – Musical or Comedy	The Devil Wears Prada	Nominated
Golden Globe Awards	January 15, 2007	Best Actress – Motion Picture Musical or Comedy	Meryl Streep	Won
Golden Globe Awards	January 15, 2007	Best Supporting Actress – Motion Picture	Emily Blunt	Nominated
Golden Schmoes Awards	December 2006	Best Supporting Actress of the Year	Emily Blunt	Nominated
Jupiter Awards	March 2007	Best International Actress	Meryl Streep	Nominated
Jupiter Awards	March 2007	Best International Actress	Anne Hathaway	Nominated
London Film Critics' Circle Awards	February 8, 2007	Actress of the Year	Meryl Streep	Won
London Film Critics' Circle Awards	February 8, 2007	British Supporting Actress of the Year	Emily Blunt	Won
MTV Movie Awards	June 3, 2007	Best Breakthrough Performance	Emily Blunt	Nominated
MTV Movie Awards	June 3, 2007	Best Villain	Meryl Streep	Nominated
MTV Movie Awards	June 3, 2007	Best Comedic Performance	Emily Blunt	Nominated
MTV Russia Movie Awards	April 19, 2007	Best International Movie	The Devil Wears Prada	Nominated
National Board of Review Awards	January 9, 2007	Top Ten Films	The Devil Wears Prada	Won
National Society of Film Critics Awards	January 6, 2007	Best Supporting Actress	Meryl Streep	Won
New York Film Critics Circle Awards	December 11, 2006	Best Actress	Meryl Streep	Nominated
North Texas Film Critics Association Awards	January 21, 2007	Best Actress	Meryl Streep	Won
Online Film & Television Association Awards	February 10, 2007	Best Actress	Meryl Streep	Nominated
Online Film & Television Association Awards	February 10, 2007	Best Costume Design	Patricia Field	Nominated
Online Film Critics Society Awards	January 8, 2007	Best Actress	Meryl Streep	Nominated
People's Choice Awards	January 9, 2007	Favorite Song from a Movie	"Crazy" – Alanis Morissette	Nominated
Rembrandt Awards	March 2007	Best International Actress	Meryl Streep	Won
Satellite Awards	December 18, 2006	Best Motion Picture – Musical or Comedy	The Devil Wears Prada	Nominated
Satellite Awards	December 18, 2006	Best Actress – Motion Picture Musical or Comedy	Meryl Streep	Won
Satellite Awards	December 18, 2006	Satellite Award for Best Costume Design	Patricia Field	Won
Screen Actors Guild Awards	January 28, 2007	Outstanding Performance by a Female Actor in a Leading Role	Meryl Streep	Nominated
St. Louis Gateway Film Critics Association Awards	January 7, 2007	Best Supporting Actress	Meryl Streep	Nominated
Teen Choice Awards	August 20, 2006	Choice Summer Movie: Comedy	The Devil Wears Prada	Nominated
Teen Choice Awards	August 20, 2006	Choice Movie: Chemistry	Meryl Streep; Anne Hathaway	Nominated
Teen Choice Awards	August 20, 2006	Choice Movie: Breakout Star – Female	Emily Blunt	Nominated
Teen Choice Awards	August 20, 2006	Choice Movie: Villain	Meryl Streep	Nominated
USC Scripter Awards	February 18, 2007	Best Screenplay	Aline Brosh McKenna; Lauren Weisberger	Nominated
Vancouver Film Critics Circle Awards	January 9, 2007	Best Supporting Actress	Meryl Streep	Nominated
Women Film Critics Circle Awards	December 14, 2006	Best Comedic Performance	Meryl Streep	Won
Women Film Critics Circle Awards	December 14, 2006	Best Woman Storyteller	Aline Brosh McKenna	Won
Writers Guild of America Awards	February 11, 2007	Best Adapted Screenplay	Aline Brosh McKenna	Nominated

== In other media ==
The film's success led to a proposed American dramedy series meant to air for the 2007–08 season on Fox. However, it never reached a pilot episode. With the video release came renewed interest in Weisberger's novel. It ranked eighth on USA Today's list of 2006 best sellers and was the second most borrowed book in American libraries. The audiobook version was released in October 2006 and quickly made it to third on that medium's fiction best seller list.

== Home media ==
The DVD was released on December 12, 2006 with an audio commentary, a humorous five-minute blooper reel, and five featurettes. A Blu-ray Disc was released simultaneously, without the featurettes.

=== Reception ===
Immediately upon its December 12 release, it became the top rental in the United States. It held that spot through the end of the year, adding another $26.5 million to the film's grosses, it dropped out of the top 50 at the end of March, with its grosses almost doubling. The following week it made its debut on the DVD sales charts in third position. By the end of 2007 it had sold nearly 5.6 million units, for a total of $94.4 million in sales.

=== Deleted scenes ===
Among the deleted scenes are some that added background, with commentary by the editor and director. Most were deleted by Livolsi. Frankel approved of his editor's choices, differing on one scene, showing more of Andy on her errand to the Calvin Klein showroom. He felt that scene showed Andrea's job was about more than running personal errands for Miranda. A different version of the scene at the gala was rediscovered by Spencer Althouse, BuzzFeed's community manager. In it, instead of Andy reminding Miranda of a guest's name after the sickened Emily cannot, Miranda's husband shows up and makes rude comments to not only his wife but Ravitz, the head of Elias-Clarke. Andy earns a silent "thank you" from Miranda when she helps prevent the confrontation from escalating by diverting Ravitz with a question of her own.

== Cultural impact and legacy ==
In 2016, Vanity Fair noted how some better-remembered films had been bested by films that have not stood the test of time. It called Superman Returns' win over The Devil Wears Prada the "most ironic" of these victories. In 2025, it was voted for the "Readers' Choice" edition of The New York Times' list of "The 100 Best Movies of the 21st Century", finishing at number 111.

=== Cast ===
Variety argued that the film had benefited all three of its lead actresses. It had proven that Streep could be a box-office draw by herself, opening doors for her to lead in summer movies such as Mamma Mia! (2008) and Julie & Julia (2009). For Hathaway, it was her first leading role in a film for an adult audience. Subsequent producers were impressed that she had held her own playing opposite Streep, which led to her being cast in more serious roles like Rachel Getting Married (2008) and Les Misérables (2012), for which she won an Oscar.

Hathaway believes that Blunt's career took off because of her role, saying "I've never witnessed a star being born before." Blunt agrees that it was "a night and day change" for her — the day after the film was released, she told Variety, the staff at the coffee shop she had been going to for breakfast every morning in Los Angeles suddenly recognized her. Even ten years later, people still quote her lines from the film back to her at least once a week, she says.

Despite the fashion industry's fears that cooperating with the film's production would cause exile from Vogue, both Hathaway and Streep appeared multiple times on the magazine's cover afterward.

=== Audience demographics ===
In a 2016 IndieWire article, producer Elizabeth Gabler recalled, "[The film] definitely paved the way for the filmmakers and distributors of the world to know that there was a female audience that was really strong out there", one that was not segmented by age. "Prada reminds me of movies that we don't have a lot of now—it harkens back to classic movies that had so much more than just one kind of plot line … You just keep wanting to find something that can touch upon the same zeitgeist as this film".

For Streep, the most significant thing about the film was that, telling Indiewire, "This was the first time, on any movie I have ever made, where men came up to me and said, 'I know what you felt like, this is kind of like my life.' That was for me the most ground-breaking thing about Devil Wears Prada—it engaged men on a visceral level".

=== Popular culture and society ===
The film had a lasting impact on popular culture. In 2009, The Simpsons titled an episode "The Devil Wears Nada" and parodied some scenes. The American version of The Office began an episode with Steve Carell as Michael Scott imitating Miranda after watching the film on Netflix. On episode 18 of season 14 of Keeping Up with the Kardashians, Kris Jenner dressed as Miranda, channeling her 'Boss Lady' persona. In 2019, reports that Minnesota Senator Amy Klobuchar, then seeking the Democratic presidential nomination, mistreated her staff and making unreasonable demands led some writers to mention Miranda.

In 2008, The New York Times wrote that the movie had defined the public image of a personal assistant. Seven years later, Dissent's Francesca Mari pointed to The Devil Wears Prada as the best-known narrative of assistantship. The next year, writing about a proposed change in U.S. federal overtime regulations that threatened that practice, the Times called it the "Devil Wears Prada economy".

On the film's 10th anniversary, Alyssa Rosenberg wrote in The Washington Post that Miranda anticipated female antiheroines of popular television series like Scandal's Olivia Pope and Cersei Lannister in Game of Thrones. Like them, she observes, Miranda competently assumes a position of authority, despite her moral failings, that she must defend against attempts to use her personal life to remove her from it. In doing so, however, "she has zipped herself into a life as regimented and limited as a skintight pencil skirt".

Five years later, Mekia Rivas in Harper's Bazaar faulted the film's portrayal of Miranda and Andy's relationship as reinforcing a false belief that since a young woman may only get one career break, she should take it no matter what she has to put up with from her boss. At the time of the film's release, Rivas noted that "girlbosses" epitomized by Miranda had been seen as potentially revolutionizing the workplace. Rivas described Miranda as "a totally toxic superior who, in the end, was more interested in upholding the status quo than in reinventing it, despite having all the power and authority to do so. She wanted Andy to believe that saying no to her would be the end of her career, even though she knew Andy had all the potential in the world to make it without her or her connections".

"Like many instant classics, Prada benefited from perfect timing", Variety's 2016 article observed, attempting to explain the film's enduring appeal. "It marked the beginning of the democratization of the fashion industry — when the masses started to pay attention to the business of what they wore". It credited the movie with helping stir interest in Ugly Betty, an American adaptation of the Colombian telenovela Yo soy Betty, la fea, which debuted months after the film's release.

The film has been credited with increasing interest in R.J. Cutler's documentary The September Issue, which followed Wintour and other Vogue editors as they prepared the issue for that month of 2007. Writing in The Ringer on the tenth anniversary, Alison Herman observed that "The Devil Wears Prada transformed Wintour's image from that of a mere public figure into that of a cultural icon". Once known primarily as a fashion editor, she was now "every overlord you'd ever bitched about three drinks deep at happy hour, only to dutifully fetch her coffee the next day". Ultimately, the film had effected a positive change in Wintour's image, Herman argued, "from a tyrant in chinchilla to an idol for the post-Sandberg age".

As the film turned 10, Variety's 2016 article stated, "[The characterization] showed Hollywood that it was never wise to underestimate a strong woman's worth".

=== Antipathy to Nate ===
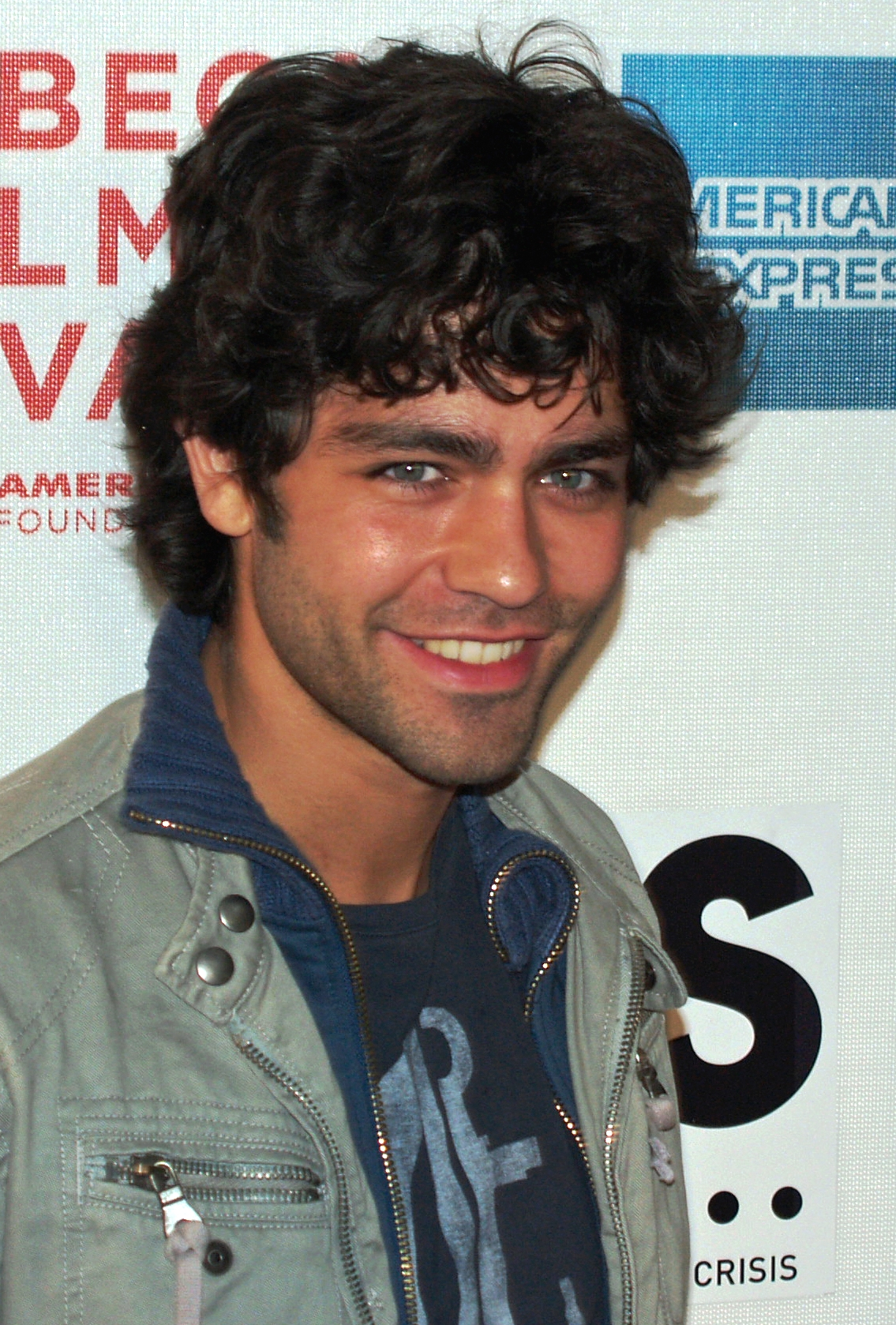
Years after the film's release, Grenier (photographed in 2007) came to terms with the public's negative reaction to his character.

In 2021, Grenier spoke about how Nate had come to be perceived as the film's "real villain". Pratishruti Ganguly, writing for Firstpost, described him as "not just an insecure boyfriend, he is judgemental, toxic, and repulsive". "He mocks her for her new interest in fashion, he trivializes the magazine she works at, and dismisses her hard work", Entertainment Weekly wrote in 2017, collecting posts from social media critical of the character. Many, like the writer of that piece, found it particularly upsetting that he berated Andy for missing his birthday party even though she had a good work-related reason for her absence. McKenna defended the character: "[W]hat people focus on is that he's trying to restrict her ambition [...] But her ambition is going towards something that she doesn't really believe in, so he has a point". On the film's 15th anniversary, Grenier weighed in: "When that whole thing … first came out, I couldn't get my head around it". He ultimately came to realize that he had more in common with the character at the time and, like Nate, had not completely matured, and "after taking time to reflect and much deliberation online, I can realize the truth in that perspective… He couldn't support her like she needed because he was a fragile, wounded boy". Hathaway was more forgiving, pointing out that anyone can be pouty at times.

== Themes ==
University of Houston gender studies professor Andrew Joseph Pegoda notes that the film never challenges the arbitrariness and unfairness of female beauty standards, rather presenting them as unchangeable and unchallengeable, even where the women in the film seem to chafe at them. He sees this in the beginning, with Tunstall's "Suddenly I See", its lyrics celebrating the ideal of a beautiful woman over images of Andy and the other women working for Runway getting dressed ("When have we ever seen a movie play a song where standards for male beauty are described?", he asks). Even Miranda is framed by the male gaze when seen for the first time with only her legs visible. He reads the film as suggesting that Andy gets her job at the Mirror at the end in part due to her improved attention to her appearance.

== Sequel ==
In 2013, Weisberger wrote a book sequel, Revenge Wears Prada: The Devil Returns. However, it did not seem likely that a film adaptation of it, or any sequel, would be made, as two of the film's stars were not eager to do so. Streep reportedly said that she was not interested in a sequel, and while Hathaway said she would be interested in working with the same people, it would have to be "something totally different". In July 2024, it was reported that Walt Disney Studios was entering early development on a sequel. Frankel was in talks to return as the director, while McKenna and Finerman were set to write the screenplay and produce again, respectively.

The Devil Wears Prada 2 was released on May 1, 2026, by 20th Century Studios. It follows Miranda as she navigates her career and Andy's return to Runway amid the decline of traditional magazine publishing, and reconnects her with Emily, now a high-ranking executive for a luxury group with advertising funding that Runway needs. Streep, Hathaway, Blunt, and Tucci reprise their roles, with Kenneth Branagh, Lucy Liu, Justin Theroux, B. J. Novak, Simone Ashley, and Pauline Chalamet joining as new additions.

== Musical adaptation ==
In 2015, it was reported that Broadway producer Kevin McCollum had signed a deal two years earlier with Fox to develop some of the films from its back catalog into musicals for the stage. Two he expressed particular interest in were Mrs. Doubtfire (1993) and The Devil Wears Prada. Early in 2017, McCollum announced that in partnership with Fox Stage Productions, he was developing a musical version of The Devil Wears Prada (based on both the film and the book). Sir Elton John and Shaina Taub wrote the score and lyrics for the project with playwright Paul Rudnick, who had written some early scenes for the screenplay, wrote the book and lyrics. McCollum did not say when he expected it to premiere but hoped it would eventually play on Broadway.

In July 2019, the show held its first industry-only presentation of the initial reading for the show. It featured Emily Skinner as Miranda, Krystina Alabado as Andy, Heléne Yorke as Emily and Mario Cantone as Nigel. There has been no announcement about future workshops or tryouts before the anticipated Broadway run.

In late September a premiere run was announced for July and August 2020 at the James M. Nederlander Theatre in Chicago. According to producer Kevin McCollum, it was important to director Anna D. Shapiro, artistic director of the Steppenwolf Theater Company in Chicago, to have the show premiere there. Afterwards the show is expected to make its Broadway debut, where and when have not been announced.

== See also ==
- 2006 in film
- The Intern, 2000 comedy about an overworked and mistreated low-level employee at a New York fashion magazine
- Ugly Betty is a TV show about an overworked assistant working for a fashion magazine

== Bibliography ==
- Weisberger, Laura (2003). The Devil Wears Prada. New York: Broadway Books. ISBN 0-7679-1476-7.
