= Alec Musser =

American model and actor (1973–2024)

- Musser in 2010
- Born: Alexander Barrett Musser; April 11, 1973; New York City, U.S.
- Died: January 12, 2024 (aged 50); Del Mar, California, U.S.
- Education: University of San Diego; Connecticut College (BA)
- Occupations: Actor, model
- Years active: 1993–2024
- Height: 1.85 m (6 ft 1 in)

Alexander Barrett Musser (April 11, 1973 – January 12, 2024) was an American actor and model. After winning Season Two of I Wanna Be a Soap Star, he had a recurring role in the soap opera All My Children.

== Early life and education ==
Musser was born in New York City and raised in Tenafly, New Jersey; he had an older brother. His father died by suicide when he was in his early teens. After graduating from the Westminster School, he studied at the University of San Diego and earned a degree in English from Connecticut College.

== Career ==
Musser was working as a ski patrolman when he was discovered by a modeling agent; in 2002 he was one of the models in Bruce Weber's ad campaign for Abercrombie & Fitch, and he went on to model for magazines including GQ, Cosmopolitan, Men's Health, and Men's Workout, the last two on the cover.

In August 2005, Musser won the second season of the reality TV contest I Wanna Be a Soap Star, following which he had a recurring role from 2005 to 2007 on All My Children, reviving the role of Del Henry, previously played until 1995 by Winsor Harmon. His contract was extended from the original 13 weeks.

He appeared in the 2010 film Grown Ups and in episodes of the series Rita Rocks and Road to the Altar in 2009 and Desperate Housewives in 2011.

== Death ==
Musser was engaged to be married to Paige Press. He died by suicide at home in Del Mar, California, on January 12, 2024.

== Filmography ==
=== Television ===
- I Wanna Be a Soap Star as himself (2005 winner)
- All My Children as Del Henry #2 (2005–07)
- Rita Rocks as Plumber (2009)
- Desperate Housewives as Friedrich (2012, episode "Watch While I Revise the World")

=== Web ===
- Road to the Altar as Camera Guy

=== Films ===
- Grown Ups as Guy in the Water Park
