= Mark Livolsi =

American film editor (1962–2018)

- Born: Mark Allen Livolsi; April 10, 1962; Mt. Lebanon, Pennsylvania, U.S.
- Died: September 23, 2018 (aged 56); Pasadena, California, U.S.
- Occupation: Film editor
- Years active: 1985–2018
- Spouse: Maria Livolsi
- Children: 2

Mark Allen Livolsi (April 10, 1962 – September 23, 2018) was an American film editor. He is known primarily for his work on the hit comedies Wedding Crashers (2005) and The Devil Wears Prada (2006), both of which were nominated for an ACE Eddie Award.

== Career ==
Livolsi's first film editing credit was for Cameron Crowe's Vanilla Sky (2001), with Joe Hutshing. Livolsi had worked as an associate editor with Hutshing and Saar Klein on Crowe's previous film, Almost Famous (2000), whose editing was recognized by an Academy Award nomination. By the time he worked on Almost Famous, Livolsi had extensive experience as an assistant film editor, including four of Woody Allen's films that were edited by Susan E. Morse; Livolsi acknowledges Morse, David Brenner, Alan Heim, and Hutshing as his educators and mentors.

Livolsi was from Canonsburg, Pennsylvania.

== Death ==
Livolsi died in Pasadena, California, aged 56. His final film as editor, The Lion King (2019), is dedicated to him.

== Selected filmography ==
Editor
Year	Film	Director	Notes
2001	Vanilla Sky	Cameron Crowe	
2003	Pieces of April	Peter Hedges	
2004	The Girl Next Door	Luke Greenfield	
2005	My Suicidal Sweetheart	Michael Parness	
2005	Wedding Crashers	David Dobkin	First collaboration with Dobkin
2006	The Devil Wears Prada	David Frankel	First collaboration with Frankel
2007	Fred Claus	David Dobkin	
2008	Marley & Me	David Frankel	
2009	The Blind Side	John Lee Hancock	First collaboration with Hancock
2011	The Big Year	David Frankel	
2011	We Bought a Zoo	Cameron Crowe	
2012	Stand Up Guys	Fisher Stevens	
2013	Saving Mr. Banks	John Lee Hancock	
2014	The Judge	David Dobkin	
2016	The Jungle Book	Jon Favreau	First collaboration with Favreau
2017	Wonder	Stephen Chbosky	
2019	The Lion King	Jon Favreau	Posthumous release

Editorial department
Year	Film	Director	Role	Notes
1987	Dead of Winter	Arthur Penn	Second assistant editor	
1987	Wall Street	Oliver Stone	Apprentice editor: New York	First collaboration with Oliver Stone
1988	Funny Farm	George Roy Hill	Assistant film editor	
1989	The Dream Team	Howard Zieff	Apprentice editor: New York	
1989	Crimes and Misdemeanors	Woody Allen	Assistant film editor	First collaboration with Woody Allen
1990	Alice	Woody Allen	Assistant film editor	Second collaboration with Woody Allen
1991	Shadows and Fog	Woody Allen	Assistant film editor	Third collaboration with Woody Allen
1992	Night and the City	Irwin Winkler	Assistant editor: New York	
1993	Heaven & Earth	Oliver Stone	Second assistant editor	Second collaboration with Oliver Stone
1994	The River Wild	Curtis Hanson	Assistant editor	
1995	French Kiss	Lawrence Kasdan	First assistant editor	
1996	Marvin's Room	Jerry Zaks	Assistant editor	
1997	Deconstructing Harry	Woody Allen	Assistant film editor	Fourth collaboration with Woody Allen
1998	Meet Joe Black	Martin Brest	Assistant editor	
1999	The Thomas Crown Affair	John McTiernan	Assistant editor	
2000	Almost Famous	Cameron Crowe	Associate editor	First collaboration with Cameron Crowe
2005	Elizabethtown	Cameron Crowe	Additional editing	Third collaboration with Cameron Crowe
2009	The Winning Season	James C. Strouse	Additional editor	
2010	MacGruber	Jorma Taccone	Additional editor	

Sound department
Year	Film	Director	Role
1985	Seven Minutes in Heaven	Linda Feferman	Apprentice sound editor
1986	Heartburn	Mike Nichols	Assistant sound editor

Thanks
Year	Film	Director	Role
2019	The Lion King	Jon Favreau	In memory of our friend
