= Isaak James =

American film director

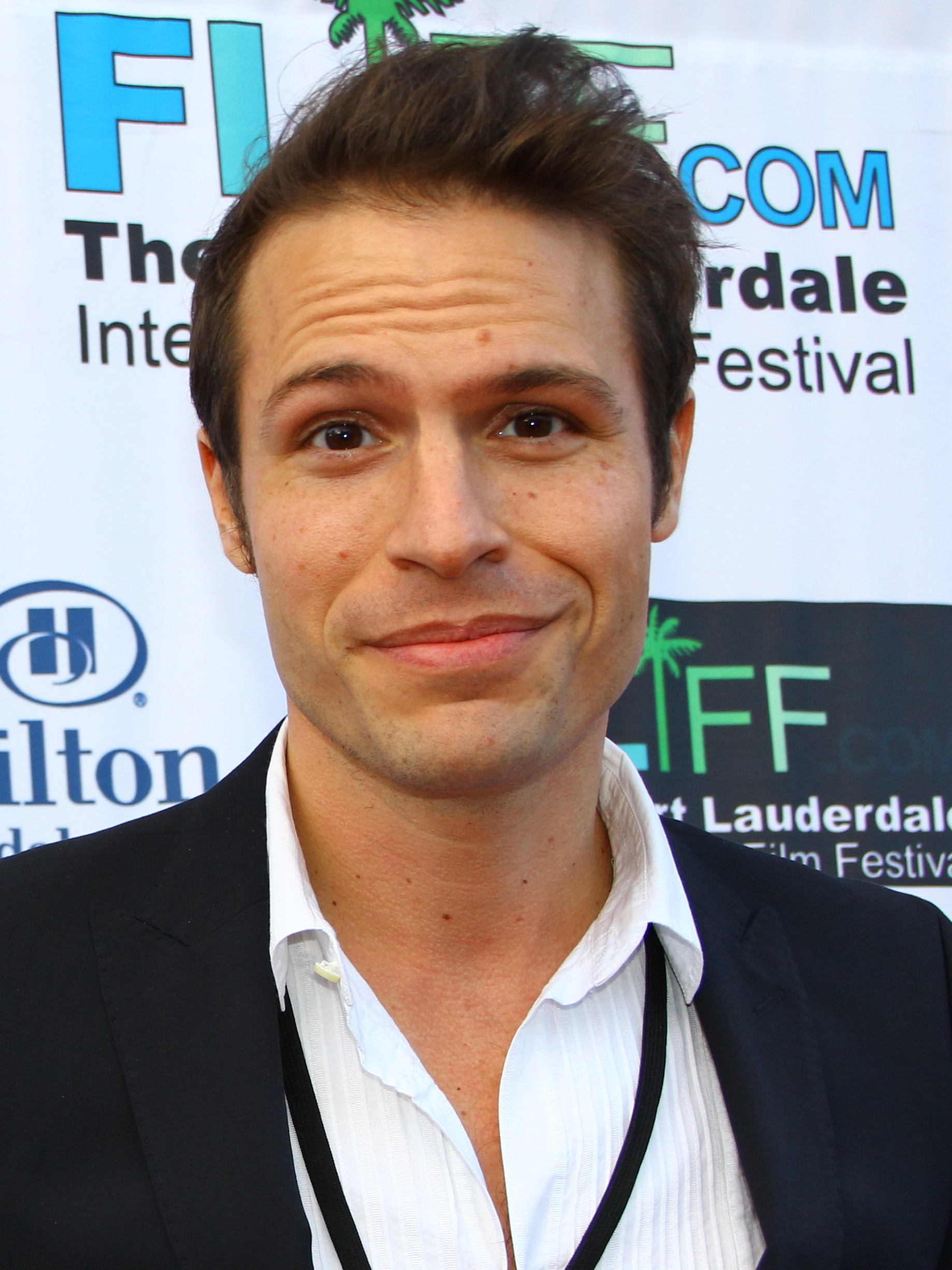
James in 2011

Isaak James, an American film director, actor, singer and musician, was born on Cape Cod, Massachusetts. He is known as the founder of Last Ditch Pictures and is based in New York.

== Education ==
James graduated from New York University's Tisch School of the Arts

== Film ==
In 2006, alongside his sister Eva James, James wrote, directed and starred in Special Needs a film which was acquired by Lloyd Kaufman at Troma Entertainment in 2007.

Since 2008 James has written and directed three other feature films;

- Hungry Years (2008)
- Turbine (2010)
- By Way of Home (2011). "By Way of Home" was produced for $1000 and was referred to by Eugene Hernandez at Film Lincoln Center as part of the "Homegrown" film movement. James' most recent film "Awesome_FCK" (2015) screened as part of the Toronto International Film Festival's Short Cuts, Spring Awakening lineup and was awarded a jury prize at the Provincetown International Film Festival.

James' films are available on Netflix, Amazon & iTunes

== Television ==
James has appeared in TV shows including I Wanna Be a Soap Star 2.
