= Special Needs (film) =

2006 dark comedy

Special Needs is a dark comedy/satire about three reality TV producers creating a show about people with physical and mental disabilities. The film was written, produced, and directed by Isaak James, who also starred in it.

== Critical response ==
DVD Talk rated it "highly recommended", calling it "an instant candidate for independent comedy of the year ". Variety called it "a rip-roaring good time" that succeeded with a subject that could have been disastrous. Blogcritics found it "tastelessly hilarious". French site Horreur.com was a bit more measured in its praise, suggesting a mixture of laughter and gritting of teeth as an appropriate reaction but awarded a rating of 5/6.

== Release ==
It was an official selection at the Calgary International Film Festival and Westwood International Film Festival. It was released on DVD by Troma.
