= Special Needs Evacuation Tracking System =

The Texas Special Needs Evacuation Tracking System was a tracking system for emergency evacuees developed by AT&T for the state of Texas. The system was based on tracking RFID tags attached to the wrists of evacuees via the AT&T/Cingular wireless network and a data center at the University of Texas Center for Space Research. Evacuees were indirectly tracked using GPS locators mounted on the vehicles in which they were traveling.

The Texas Division of Emergency Management (TDEM) awarded the contract to AT&T in December 2007. Parts of the system were deployed as early as 2006, prior to AT&T's involvement, but AT&T had taken over overall responsibility for its operation. The system has been tested three times. Texas officials planned to use the system during Hurricane Dean, but the storm changed course and missed Texas.

In 2008, SNETS was nominated in the Laureates Class of Computerworld Honors Program honoring those who uses Information Technology to benefit society.

The TDEM replaced this system with the Emergency Tracking Network, which features iOS and Android apps as well as a web enabled system.

As of September 2017, there is a committee in Texas to improve the functions.
