= Shout About Music =

DVD music trivia game

- Designers: ODVD
- Publishers: Hasbro
- Players: At least 4 (played in teams)
- Setup time: none
- Playing time: 30 to 45 minutes
- Chance: Low
- Age range: 13+
- Skills: Music knowledge
- Each volume of the DVD game includes three prearranged games; unlike Scene It?, "Shout About" games' questions do not change every time the game is played.

Shout About Music is a music DVD trivia game created by ODVD and distributed by Hasbro, released on August 1, 2005, as a follow-up to their line of "Shout About Movies" games.

== Background & release ==
In a press release, Mark Blecher of Hasbro Games stated that "This latest portfolio of SHOUT ABOUT games - music, country music and TV - reflect today's high-energy, fast-paced gaming style, providing players with instant gratification and immediate play." Two volumes of the game were released on August 1, 2005. A Country Music edition of the game was also released, exclusively available at Wal-Mart. Hasbro promoted the game, alongside Shout About TV, as among its releases for the 2005 holiday season. Two volumes of the game were later released in the UK, under the titles "Chart Toppers" and "Battle of the Bands."

== Gameplay ==
The game consists of 8 rounds, played entirely using a TV remote.

Round One: Name That Song

A snippet of a song is played, and the teams must attempt to shout out the name of the song. All players play simultaneously. Each correct answer earns one point.

Round Two: Still Crazies

Album covers comes together piece by piece; the teams must try to shout out the name of the recording artist who released the albums. All players play simultaneously. Each correct answer earns one point.

Round Three: Match Round

Snippets of five music videos for songs from Round One are shown; six trivia facts appear on-screen, and the teams attempt to match the trivia facts to the corresponding music videos. Unlike the first two rounds of game play, teams must take turns in Round Three; when a team gets an answer wrong, it's the other team's turn. Each correct answer is worth two points.

Round Four: Missing Lyric

A song's lyrics begin appearing on screen, on blue tiles. The players must shout out what word is on the golden tile, which doesn't flip over until the end. All players play simultaneously. Each correct answer is worth two points.

Round Five: Foto Frenzy

Photographs of two musicians appear side-by-side, with a trivia caption beneath them. Players must identify which of the two shown musicians the trivia fact corresponds to. When two photos with golden frames are placed side-by-side, that means that a correct answer to that question is worth five points. Teams must take turns in this round; when a team gets an answer wrong, or when a team gets a golden-frame question correct, it's the other team's turn.

Round Six: Made to Order

A series of events, song titles, or musicians' names are displayed, and the teams must be arranged smallest to largest or chronologically. As in round three, it is the other team's turn when the answering team gives a wrong answer.

Round Seven: Lighting Round

Five words or phrases all referring to the same musician or band appear onscreen. Both teams try to name the musician or band the clues refer to.

Round Eight: Final Bet

The topic the final question will be about is displayed. Both teams then bet 5, 15, 30, or all of their points. The question appears onscreen, and the teams discreetly give their answer with the remote. If they answer the question correctly, they gain that number of points, but if their answer is incorrect, they lose that number of points.

== Critical reception ==
Reception for the game was mostly positive. Kidzworld awarded the game 4 out of 5 stars, praising the game's interactivity, on-disc scoring, and mix of new and old music, but commenting that "some of the questions about older music may be a bit difficult for some players" and noting that each game can be played only once, unlike similar games such as Music Scene It? Ben Wener, writing for the Orange County Register, praised the game overall, particularly for its not requiring a board and singled out the "Foto Frenzy" round as a favorite, but objecting to the fact that each disc contains only three games, as well as observing some minor glitches.

== Credits ==
Adapted from IMDb and game credits.

Host

- Holland Reid

Voice-overs

- Gary Anthony Sturgis

Director

- Ethan Shaftel

Producers

- Norman Beil
- Chris Kantrowitz
- Alex Rose

Writers

- Hillel Aron
- Carol Beil
- Jeffrey Beil
- Norman Beil
- Aris Blevins
- Josh Covitt
- Michael Hillson
- Jeff Miller
- Jamison Selby
