= True Tori =

- Genre: Reality
- Starring: Tori Spelling; Dean McDermott
- Country of origin: United States
- Original language: English
- No. of seasons: 2
- No. of episodes: 16

Production
- Executive producers: Dean McDermott; Eli Holzman; Eli Lehrer; Greg Goldman; Mary Donahue; Paul Hardy; Robert Sizemore; Stephen Lambert; Tori Spelling
- Camera setup: Multiple
- Running time: 42 minutes
- Production companies: All3Media America; Big Country Entertainment; Studio Lambert

Original release
- Network: Lifetime
- Release: April 22 – December 9, 2014

True Tori is an American reality television series starring Tori Spelling and Dean McDermott. It premiered on April 22, 2014, on Lifetime. The series ostensibly chronicles the couple's life from three weeks after McDermott left for rehab and highlights the apparent uncertainty of their marriage due to an alleged affair. The first season consists of 8 episodes.

The series has been renewed for a second 8-episode season, which premiered on October 21, 2014. The second season continued to focus on Tori and Dean's failing marriage as they try to rebuild their relationship and make decisions that would be the best for them and their four children. Tori tries to find her "true self" and ways how to juggle between her family relationships and business ventures.

== Episodes ==
=== Season 1 (2014) ===
No. overall	Title	Original release date	US viewers (millions)
1	"The Fairytale Falls Apart"	April 22, 2014	1.18
The first episode shows how Tori made the difficult decision to allow the audience to witness her and Dean's marriage after his cheating hit the tabloids last December, as she tells her story for the first time.
2	"The Truth Comes Out"	April 29, 2014	1.05
Tori continues to rely on her friends for support while she continues to deal with Dean's infidelity.
3	"Tori Finds Her Voice"	May 6, 2014	1.02
Tori deals with Dean returning home from his time in rehab after his infidelity in Toronto surfaced and his admission into the treatment facility.
4	"Another Bump in the Road"	May 13, 2014	0.87
Tension comes to a head in Tori and Dean's marriage as they continue to work through their issues, especially during one of their therapy sessions.
5	"I Love Him and I Hate Him"	May 20, 2014	0.74
Tori is hospitalized when the stress of Dean's affair makes her ill. Later, while scrapbooking with the couple's two oldest children, Liam and Stella, she has a sobbing meltdown that leads to a screaming match with Dean about the future of their marriage.
6	"Stay or Go"	May 27, 2014	1.10
Dean is offered to host Chopped Canada again, as it has been renewed for the second season. However, the couple is torn about whether he should go to Toronto. Tori doesn't want him to go because she feels that her family needs to heal and it will only be disrupting the process. On the other hand, Dean doesn't want to leave his family, but he is conflicted because he has obligations and a career to maintain.
7	"The Reunion: All Questions Answered"	June 3, 2014	0.95
ET journalist Brooke Anderson interviews Tori and Dean as they face each other for the first time since Dean left his family for work in Canada. An update is also provided on the couple's road to reconciliation.
8	"Confessions"	June 10, 2014	0.77
Tori reflects on the most volatile moments from the season and reveals exclusive new footage shot behind closed doors.

=== Season 2 (2014) ===
No. overall	No. in series	Title	Original release date	US viewers (millions)
9	1	"Dealing with Demons"	October 21, 2014	0.77
The second season begins with Tori and Dean falling into familiar patterns after returning from vacation, but a potential pregnancy forces them to face some unanswered questions.
10	2	"Back to the Future"	October 28, 2014	0.78
Tori decides to sell a large warehouse of belongings in order to provide for her family amidst their financial problems. Meanwhile, an unanticipated discovery prompts Tori to reach out to her ex-husband, Charlie; and she and Dean struggle with their marriage as they consider a life-changing medical decision.
11	3	"Tale of Two Husbands"	November 4, 2014	0.67
Tori pursues her past in an effort to control one aspect of her life while Dean battles his demons. A serious realization leaves their marriage hanging in the air.
12	4	"First Wives Club"	November 11, 2014	0.81
Tori plans a 16th birthday party for Dean's oldest son, Jack, and is forced to face her turbulent past with Dean's ex-wife, Mary Jo Eustace.
13	5	"He Said, She Said"	November 18, 2014	0.72
Tori confronts Dean with accusations made by Mary Jo; and they visit a spiritual guru in hopes of improving their marriage.
14	6	"Raw Nerves"	November 25, 2014	0.54
Tori and Dean take steps to get their professional and personal lives back on track, but new problems surface that threaten to thwart their marriage.
15	7	"Gone Girl"	December 2, 2014	0.74
After confronting two of her most tumultuous relationships, Tori is faced with her biggest decision of her life. Dean breaks down over shattering promises, and her greatest fear becomes reality.
16	8	"Chunks of My Soul"	December 9, 2014	0.81
When Tori is admitted to the hospital, she and Dean are forced to face their issues directly and decide if they will stay together, and if they will continue to document their lives on television.
