= He Said, She Said =

He Said, She Said or He Said She Said may refer to:

== Film and TV ==
- He Said, She Said (film), 1991 romantic comedy film starring Kevin Bacon and Elizabeth Perkins.
- He Said, She Said (game show), an American game show hosted by Joe Garagiola
- He Said, She Said (TV series), a Canadian cooking show
- "She Said, He Said", prequel to "The Name of the Doctor", an episode of the television series Doctor Who
- "He Said, She Said", an episode of the animated television series I Am Weasel
- "He Said, She Said" (Brooklyn Nine-Nine), an episode of the sixth season of Brooklyn Nine-Nine

== Music ==
- He Said She Said, a 2010 album by Sue Foley and Peter Karp
- "He Said She Said" (Ashley Tisdale song), 2006
- "He Said She Said" (Chvrches song), 2021

== See also ==
- "She Said She Said", a 1966 song by The Beatles
