= Mommywood =

2009 book by Tori Spelling

- Front cover
- Author: Tori Spelling
- Language: English
- Subject: Biography, Aaron Spelling, Candy Spelling
- Publisher: Simon Spotlight Entertainment
- Publication date: April 14, 2009
- Publication place: United States
- Media type: Print (Hardcover)
- Pages: 256
- ISBN: 1-4165-9910-X
- OCLC: 232979266
- Dewey Decimal: 791.4502/8092 B 22
- LC Class: PN2287.S664 A3 2009

Mommywood is a 2009 book by Tori Spelling, released on April 14, 2009.

== Synopsis ==
Actress Tori Spelling follows up her bestselling Stori Telling with another look at her life in the spotlight. In Mommywood, Spelling describes her adventures rearing her two small children in the Hollywood Hills.
