= P.O.W. The Escape =

1986 film directed by Gideon Amir

- U.S. theatrical poster
- Directed by: Gideon Amir
- Written by: Malcolm Barbour; James Bruner; Avi Kleinberger; John Langley; Jeremy Lipp
- Produced by: Menahem Golan
- Starring: David Carradine; Charles Grant; Mako; Steve James
- Cinematography: Yehiel Ne'eman
- Edited by: Marcus Manton
- Music by: David Storrs
- Production company: Cannon Films
- Distributed by: Cannon Releasing Corporation
- Release date: April 4, 1986 (U.S.)
- Running time: 90 minutes
- Country: United States
- Languages: English; Vietnamese
- Budget: $2 million
- Box office: $2,497,233

P.O.W. The Escape is a 1986 American war film directed by Gideon Amir and starring David Carradine, Charles Grant, Mako and Steve James. It is a loose re-imagining of the plot of Vera Cruz, transposing it from the Second Franco-Mexican War to the Vietnam War. In the story, a group of captive U.S. soldiers forge a pact with the commander of their North Vietnamese camp to help him defect to the West with his personal treasure, but the lure of quick gain soon tests their fragile alliance.

== Plot ==
Colonel Cooper is a U.S. airborne commando who comes to Vietnam in 1973, with a special mission to liberate imprisoned American soldiers. He gets caught in a North Vietnamese P.O.W. camp where there are other paratroopers and soldiers. The end of the war is approaching and he, as the highest-ranking officer in the camp, is to be sent to Hanoi and prosecuted by the North Vietnamese. Camp commander Vinh gets an order to send him to court but instead of obeying it, he offers Cooper a deal — he will help him get to the American sector and then Cooper, in return, will help him emigrate to the United States, where Vinh has family.

Cooper promptly disregards his proposition, as he is a tough soldier who would rather sacrifice his own life than help the enemy. However Vinh is persistent persuading him, threatening that if he will not accept his deal, then all of the fellow prisoners from his camp will die. Given that threat Cooper reconsiders Vinh's offer, and accepts the deal, but under one condition - all of the camp prisoners must go with them. Vinh, being short of time (as Hanoi set deadline for sending Cooper to court) OK's the plan and so they leave camp in column of two jeeps and a truck (prisoners are hidden in a tank truck while Cooper goes with Vinh in a jeep). Their journey won't be without obstacles as they need to go through zones controlled by the North Vietnamese, and through the jungle wilderness.

== Cast ==
- David Carradine as Col. James Cooper
- Charles R. Floyd as Sparks
- Mako Iwamatsu as Capt. Vinh
- Steve James as Johnston
- Phil Brock as Adams
- Daniel Demorest as Thomas
- Tony Pierce as Waite
- Steve Freedman as Scott
- James Acheson as McCoy
- Rudy Daniels as Gen. Morgan
- Ken Metcalfe as Gen. Weaver
- Kenneth Glover as Teague
- Irma Alegre as Bargirl
- Spanky Manikan as NVA officer
- Estrella Antonio as Vietnamese mother
- Tony Beso Jr. as Young boy in Se village
- John Falch as GI with Thomas
- Pen Medina as NVA #1 in empty camp
- Chris Gould as POW #1
- Brian Robillard as POW #2
- Leif Erlandson as POW #3
- Brian Tasker as POW #4
- Jim Gaines as POW #5
- Eric Hahn as GI #1
- Mansour Khalili as GI #2
- Tony Realle as GI #3
- Willie Williams as GI #4
- Avraham Karpick as Murphy
- Bill Kipp as Soldier at fuel depot
- Andrew Sommer as Soldier at fuel depot
- Victor Barjo as Soldier at fuel depot
- John Barrett as Soldier at fuel depot
- Henry Strzalkowski as Soldier at fuel depot
- Steven L. Long soldier in helicopter (opening credits)
- Donnald P. Sibble as door-gunner

== Production ==
=== Development ===
With Rambo: First Blood Part II keeping the Vietnam P.O.W. question at the forefront of cinematic trends, Cannon Films greenlit a new film on the subject, under the working title Behind Enemy Lines. The premise of escorting a VIP and his secret treasure through a conflict zone was inspired by the 1954 western Vera Cruz. Israeli Gideon Amir made his main unit directorial debut with this film. He had already worked on several Cannon projects set in the Philippines, including serving as line producer on the company's earlier foray into the same subgenre, Missing in Action. This was the first collaboration between Carradine and Cannon. The company's boss, Menahem Golan, had previously approached him on several occasions, but the work he offered overlapped with Carradine's own projects from a creative standpoint. Supporting players Charles Grant, Steve James and Phil Brock were known quantities at Cannon, and were brought back thanks to their good rapport with either Amir or Golan.

=== Filming ===
Photography started on July 8, 1985, and it was reported complete by the trade press on September 12. Filming coincided with monsoon season, which was a conscious decision to give it a more intense look, but it did not suffer any major delay as a result. The region of Pagsanjan, Laguna, served as a major backdrop. The shoot was subject to stringent security measures due to the combined threat of Communist and Islamic guerrilla groups fighting Ferdinand Marcos' army, who was guarding the crew. Vehicles and itineraries to the shooting locations changed regularly to dissuade attacks, and Carradine seldom left the crew's headquarters at the Manila Hotel during his spare time.

The veteran actor, having worked many times in the Philippines, was very selective about his food, contrary to most of his colleagues. He and co-star Charles Floyd, who followed his advice as the two had become fast friends, were among the few to not get sick. Actor Phil Brock worked through a hepatitis. Greg Walker had been hired as Carradine's stunt double, but he had to be sent home early after catching dysentery. Concurrently, South African stuntman and friend Allan Oberholzer had fallen out of favor with the authorities of his country, and was looking for a way out. Carradine arranged for him to join him in the Philippines, and he became his new double.

=== Post-production ===
While Golan was pleased with the dailies sent to him during production, once the film was assembled, he felt that Carradine's character was too ambivalent towards the war, and demanded that some of his dialogue be excised to emphasize his heroism. Frequent Cannon scribe James Bruner was brought in to write new exposition that would tie the remaining footage together, and one day of pickups was arranged in Los Angeles to bring those scenes to life.

== Release ==
=== Theatrical ===
P.O.W. The Escape was released in U.S. theaters on April 4, 1986, by the producer's distribution arm, Cannon Releasing Corporation.

=== Home media ===
The film was released on U.S. VHS and Betamax on September 3, 1986, by Media Home Entertainment. Media also offered a LaserDisc in collaboration with disc-based media specialists Image Entertainment. The film was re-issued on Blu-ray by Scorpion Releasing, under license from Cannon library owner MGM, on July 8, 2020. Included are interviews with Amir, Bruner and stunt coordinator Steven Lambert. For some ancillary markets and TV broadcasts, the film has been renamed Attack Force Nam.

== Reception ==
The film had a largely negative reception, although it did earn some plaudits for being less jingoistic than others in the genre. Writing for the Copley News Service, David Elliott noted that "[t]he film doesn't ooze with patriotic goo like the Sly Stallone movies" and that "Carradine may be the best of the All-American bullheads. He doesn't have the physical equipment of Arnold Schwarzenegger, but there is a flicker of sad, grim life in his eyes." However, he called the screenwriters "masters of the anti-Socratic method" for their lapses in logic. Bill Cosford of The Miami Herald found the film "as apolitical as it is uninspired", showcasing action that is "standard for the form." He deemed that it "bears the sign of writers at their wit's end", and did not find Carradine convincing in a war movie, assessing: "Rambo, he isn't." Syndicated in Gannett newspapers, William Wolf opined that the film "is not as manipulative and exploitative [as the latest Rambo]. But it's not very compelling, either." He noted the script's "customary cliches" and the "unconvincing" action, where "soldiers leap so high with every explosion that they resemble acrobats".

John Laycock of the Windsor Star granted that it "threatened a burst of imagination" with the uneasy alliance between Cooper and his Vietnamese counterpart, but quickly devolved into gunfights "directed as badly as a rush hour traffic jam" and carried by an aging Carradine, whose "fierceness is dimming". Richard Horn of the Abilene Reporter-News commented: "Nobody is going to ask for a second viewing, although one is not too bad, especially for fans of Carradine" who seems to have "great fun with his role". Noting that the film "doesn't deal in big themes about America's loss of nerve and innocence", and owed more to the World War II B-movies of old, he concluded: "If there is such a thing as a wholesome, but still quite violent, film about the Vietnam war, P.O.W. tries to be one."

== Soundtrack ==
The film's main theme is credited to David Storrs, but Cannon regular Michael Linn also contributed original material to the score. Other cues were re-used from in-house productions Revenge of the Ninja and The Delta Force.

== Bibliography ==
- Trunick, Austin (2021). The Cannon Film Guide. Vol. II (1984–1987). Orlando: BearManor Media. ISBN 9781629338880.
- Carradine, David (1995). Endless Highway. Boston: Journey Editions. ISBN 1885203209.
