= A Christmas Visitor =

- Written by: George Samerjan; David Saperstein
- Directed by: Christopher Leitch
- Starring: William Devane; Meredith Baxter; Dean McDermott
- Music by: Charles Bernstein
- Country of origin: United States
- Original language: English

Production
- Executive producer: Gerald W. Abrams
- Producers: Paul D. Goldman; Frank Siracusa
- Cinematography: Ron Orieux
- Editor: Michael Brown
- Running time: 100 minutes
- Production company: Cypress Point Productions

Original release
- Network: Hallmark Channel
- Release: December 21, 2002

A Christmas Visitor is a 2002 American made-for-television drama film starring William Devane, Meredith Baxter and Dean McDermott. It was written by George Samerjan and David Saperstein, and directed by Christopher Leitch.

== Plot summary ==
The film concerns the story of the Boyajian family, who have not celebrated Christmas in 11 years, since their son John was killed shortly before Christmas in 1991 during the Gulf War. With their daughter Jeanie potentially facing a life-threatening illness, George decides they should once again celebrate Christmas; however, Carol adamantly refuses.

George heads to watch over the town's veterans memorial and is accosted by several teenage punks, who are scared off by "Matthew", a hitchhiker passing through town. As Matthew and George talk, Matthew claims to be a Gulf veteran who is the same age as John and served in the same regiment as John, although the two did not apparently know each other.

George invites Matthew to spend Christmas with his family, asking him to tell his wife and daughter that he knew John while they served together. George's ultimate plan is to get the family to once again celebrate Christmas, which works. But as Matthew makes up stories about himself and John, George begins to wonder about Matthew's true identity when his stories include details that only John would have known (including a notable surgical scar from an athletic injury).

At the end, it is revealed that Matthew is actually John making a supernatural visit (by revealing the scar mentioned earlier) in order to restore the family's Christmas spirit.

== Cast ==
- William Devane as George Boyajian
- Meredith Baxter as Carol Boyajian
- Dean McDermott as "Matthew"/John Boyajian
- Reagan Pasternak as Jeanie Boyajian
- Aaron Ashmore as John Boyajian
- Riley Chitty as Jeanie Boyjian (11 yr old)
- Richard Blackburn as Larry Williamson
- Judy Sinclair as Mary Simpson
- Mung-Ling Tsui as Dr. Ortiz
- Johnathan Whittaker as Tom
- Frank McAnulty as Artie
- Craig Eldridge as Lester
- Joan Gregson as Miss Kearney
- Lindy Booth as Liz

== See also ==
- List of Christmas films
