= Ken Kostick =

Canadian chef and television and radio personality

- Born: 1 June 1953; Winnipeg, Manitoba
- Died: 21 April 2011 (aged 57); Toronto, Ontario
- Occupations: Chef, television personality, author

Ken Kostick (1 June 1953 – 21 April 2011) was a Canadian chef and television and radio personality, best known for co-hosting the television series What's for Dinner? with Mary Jo Eustace.

== Early life ==
Kostick was born in Winnipeg on 1 June 1953 and was raised in the North End, Winnipeg area. He also attended St. John's High School.

== Broadcasting career ==
He cohosted the Life Network series What's for Dinner? with Eustace in the 1990s and early 2000s. The show was noted particularly for Kostick and Eustace's comedic banter, focusing in part on whether or not Kostick and Eustice were a couple, as well as Kostick's public ambiguity at the time about whether or not he was gay.

He also wrote several bestselling cookbooks and put out an eponymous line of cooking products.

Kostick and Eustace debuted on Toronto's new LGBT-focused radio station Proud FM in 2007 as cohosts of the morning show. Eustace left the show in June 2008, following which Kostick continued to host alone until leaving the station in December of that year. The duo then reunited for the new W Network series He Said, She Said with Ken and Mary Jo.

== Death ==
On 21 April 2011, Kostick died in Toronto of complications of pancreatitis. He was 57 years old.
