= What's for Dinner? (Canadian TV series) =

Canadian cooking show

What's for Dinner? is a Canadian cooking show that initially aired on Life Network and was later syndicated around the world. The series started in 1994 and ended in 1999.

The series was hosted by Ken Kostick, a chef and cookbook author from Winnipeg, along with Mary Jo Eustace. Kostick, inspired by U.S. sitcom Home Improvement that he was a big fan of, and similar "behind the scenes" comedy programs, had come up with the idea of a sitcom built around a genuine cooking program, much like Home Improvement occasionally featured genuine products and tips mixed in with its comedy.

The idea of producing a sitcom was eventually dropped; instead, What's for Dinner? developed into a humour-based cooking show. Mary Jo Eustace, a Canadian actress, fashion model, singer-songwriter, comedian, and trained sous-chef who stood a bit taller than the diminutive Kostick, was initially hired to solo host the series, but when it was discovered Eustace and Kostick had good on-camera chemistry, it was decided to make the show a duo act.

The appeal of the series was not so much in the dishes prepared, but in the comedic banter—and, quite frequently, barbs—thrown back and forth between the two hosts. Kostick in particular found himself acting as "straight man" to Eustace, as well as the target of a number of running jokes ranging from his height (or lack thereof) to whether or not Ken and Mary Jo were actually a couple to whether or not Ken was gay.

Originally filmed in a closed studio with no audience, later seasons added a live studio audience. During the show's final year, episodes were videotaped in cities across Canada. The series was also syndicated around the world and was, for a time, the highest-rated series on the Life Network. It was previously broadcast on the Q Television Network.

In September 2006, Evanov Radio Group announced that Kostick and Eustace would reunite as hosts of the morning show on CIRR-FM, that company's new LGBT radio station in Toronto, Ontario. Later in 2008, the pair teamed up for another similar cooking show called He Said, She Said with Ken and Mary Jo on the W Network.

The Show was later Repeated on Global Television Network in the late 1990s and early 2000s including NTV while most CTV stations aired Live with Regis and Kathie Lee (now Kelly and Mark; coincidentally from the soap opera. All My Children).
