= Tori Spelling =

American actress (born 1973)

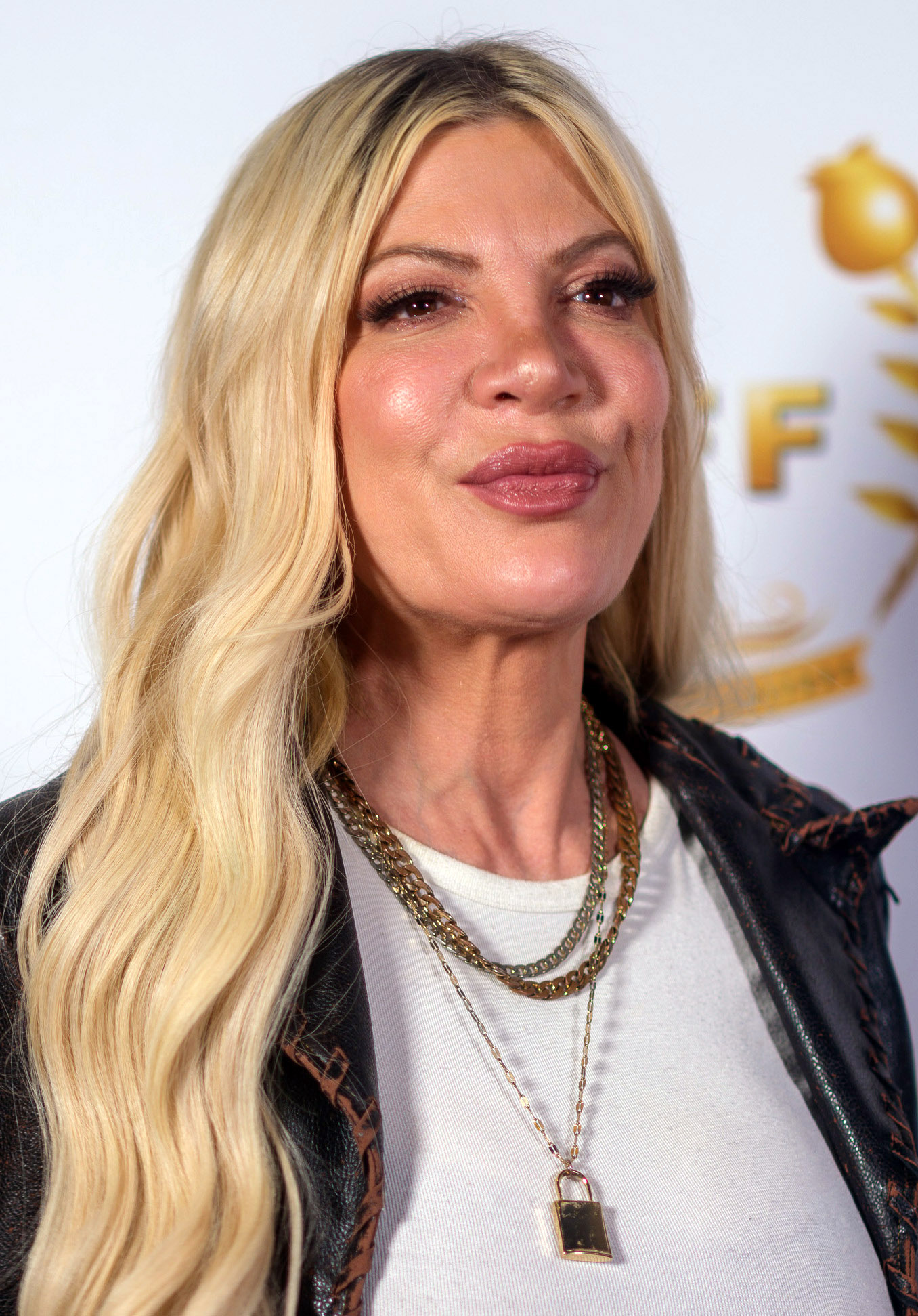
- Spelling at the 2025 Pasadena International Film Festival
- Born: Victoria Davey Spelling; May 16, 1973 (age 53); Los Angeles, California, U.S.
- Occupations: Actress; author; television personality
- Years active: 1979–present
- Television: Beverly Hills, 90210
- Spouses: Charlie Shanian (m. 2004; div. 2006) Dean McDermott (m. 2006; div. 2025)
- Children: 5
- Parents: Aaron Spelling (father); Candy Spelling (mother)
- Relatives: Randy Spelling (brother)

Victoria Davey Spelling (born May 16, 1973) is an American actress. Her first major role was Donna Martin on Beverly Hills, 90210, from 1990 to 2000. She has appeared in made-for-television films, including A Friend to Die For (1994), A Carol Christmas (2003), The Mistle-Tones (2012), both versions of Mother, May I Sleep with Danger? (1996 and 2016) and The Last Sharknado: It's About Time (2018). She has also starred in several independent films including The House of Yes (1997), Trick (1999), Scary Movie 2 (2001), Cthulhu (2007), Kiss the Bride (2007) and Izzie's Way Home (2016). She reprised her role of Donna Martin in Beverly Hills, 90210's spin-off, BH90210, in 2019.

Spelling's autobiography, Stori Telling, topped the New York Times Best Seller list.

== Early life ==
Spelling was born in Los Angeles. She is the daughter of Candy and Aaron Spelling. She has a younger brother, Randy, a former actor who, as of 2009, works as a life coach. Spelling's parents were from Jewish families whose ancestors moved to the United States from Russia and Poland. Her middle name comes from her paternal grandfather, David. She graduated from the elite all-girls private school, the Westlake School, which after her graduation merged into the Harvard-Westlake School in 1991.

== Career ==
=== Early work ===
At age six, Spelling was given acting lessons from an acting coach hired by her father, and was subsequently given guest spots on television series such as The Love Boat, T. J. Hooker, Hotel, Fantasy Island, Vega$ and Saved by the Bell. At the age of 17, she was given the role of Donna Martin on Beverly Hills, 90210, co-produced by Aaron Spelling's company Spelling Television. Tori Spelling portrayed Donna for the show's entire run and was nominated for two Young Artist Awards.

While starring on Beverly Hills, 90210, Spelling was cast in a number of made-for-television films, including Co-ed Call Girl (1996), A Friend to Die For (1994), and Mother, May I Sleep with Danger? (1996), and several independent films, including The House of Yes (1997) and Trick (1999).

=== 2006–2009 ===
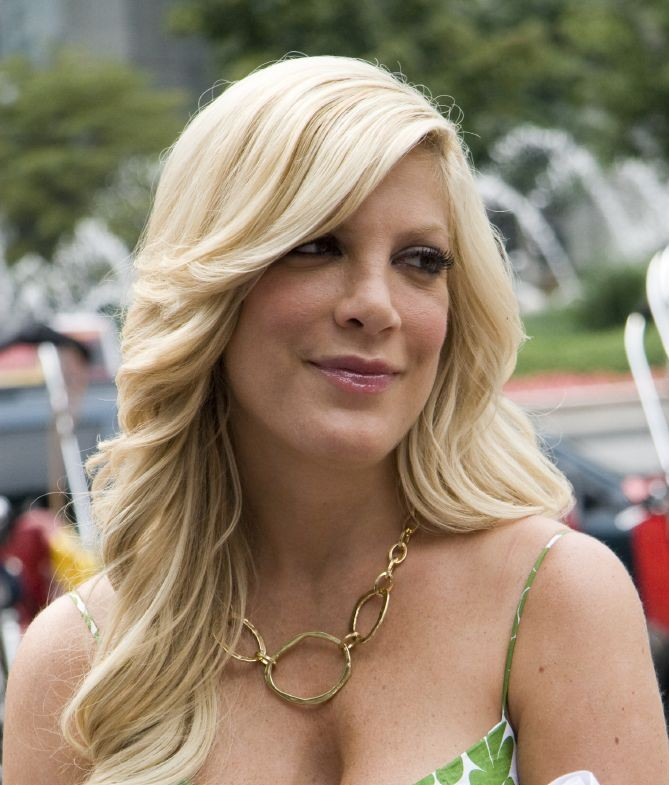
Spelling in 2007

In 2006, Spelling starred as herself in the VH1 sitcom So Notorious, which parodied her public image. In January 2007, she and her second husband Dean McDermott pretended to purchase and operate a bed and breakfast hotel, Chateau La Rue in Fallbrook, California for their reality series, Tori & Dean: Home Sweet Hollywood, originally Tori & Dean: Inn Love, which aired on Oxygen from 2007 to 2012. In July 2007, Spelling became a minister to marry a gay couple at Chateau La Rue. A tape of the wedding ceremony was shown on Inn Love.

Spelling's fashion and jewelry line premiered on HSN. She released her autobiography, sTori TELLING, on March 11, 2008. Her second book, Mommywood, was released on April 14, 2009.

On January 7, 2009, it was reported that Spelling would reprise her role as Donna Martin on the Beverly Hills, 90210 spin-off 90210. She appeared in the nineteenth and twentieth episodes of the first season as a special guest star.

=== 2010–present ===
In 2010, Spelling released her third book, Uncharted TerriTORI. Spelling told People: "I love sharing my stories and experiences with people and connecting to them on both a humorous and emotional level. The response to my first two books has been so amazing that I wanted to write a third one for my fans."

Home Sweet Hollywood's spin-off series, Tori & Dean: sTORIbook Weddings premiered on April 6, 2011. Writers, who claimed they came up with the idea of a similar series starring Spelling and husband Dean McDermott, filed a $60 million lawsuit against the series, citing breach of implied-in-fact contract, breach of fiduciary duty, slander of title, false advertising, and unfair business practices among other charges. Later in 2011, Spelling voiced the Pirate Princess in Jake and the Never Land Pirates. She played a role in the comedy short film Hoarders: Untold sTori which premiered at the Outfest Film Festival in July 2011.

On September 4, 2011, Spelling made an appearance on Big Brother 13.

On April 21, 2012, Spelling hosted the My Little Pony: Friendship Is Magic 'Royal Wedding' special, celebrating the series' second-season finale, called A Canterlot Wedding. She also hosted the series premiere of Craft Wars, where three new contestants each episode battle against each other crafting for a chance to earn $10,000.

On December 18, 2012, Spelling appeared on Nick Jr.'s Yo Gabba Gabba! and performed a skit where she baked cookies for the characters on the show. This was part of a Christmas special for the series. The special included other famous guests such as Tony Hawk and My Chemical Romance.

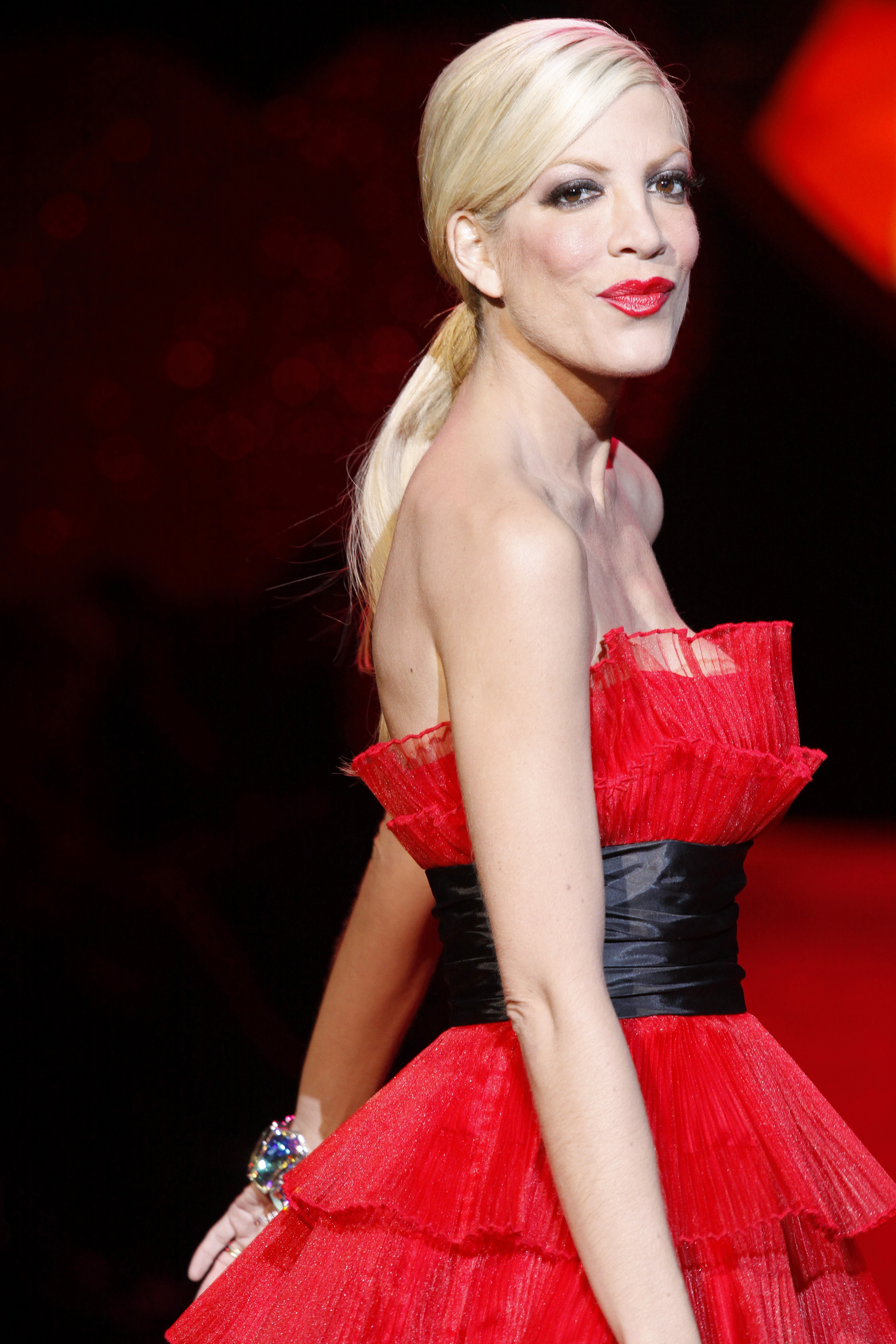
Spelling in 2009

It was announced on August 26, 2013, that production had started on a reality television series titled Tori & Dean: Cabin Fever. The series chronicles Spelling, McDermott, and their four children as they move to a lakeside cabin in Ontario, Canada while renovating it into their vacation home. Eight half-hour episodes were produced and aired on CMT Canada and HGTV in 2014.

Spelling starred in the short-lived ABC Family TV series Mystery Girls with former 90210 co-star Jennie Garth in 2014.

In 2016, Spelling voiced April in the animated movie Izzie's Way Home. The same year, she co-starred in the TV movie Mother, May I Sleep with Danger? alongside James Franco.

Beginning June 24, 2018, Spelling hosted the TV series The Look: All Stars. During that time, she appeared in the successful TV movie The Last Sharknado: It's About Time.

On January 30, 2019, Spelling competed in the first season of The Masked Singer as "Unicorn".

Also in 2019, Spelling reunited with her original Beverly Hills, 90210 castmates Jenny Garth, Jason Priestley, Shannon Doherty, Gabrielle Carteris, Ian Ziering, and Brian Austin Green for BH90210, which was a six-episode series in which the cast played heightened, fictionalized versions of themselves. The series aired on FOX in August and September 2019 and was canceled after one season.

In November 2020, Spelling began a podcast with Beverly Hills 90210 co-star Jennie Garth titled 9021OMG, where the two re-watch and share memories from their time on the show and chat about their experiences, along with TV and radio personality Sisanie Villaclara.

In 2022, Spelling appeared as a guest on the Australian and French versions of The Masked Singer. In 2023, she competed in the Spanish version of The Masked Singer as "Harlequin".

In September 2024, Spelling was announced as one of the celebrities competing on season 33 of Dancing with the Stars. She is partnered with Pasha Pashkov.

== Personal life ==
On July 3, 2004, Spelling married actor and writer Charlie Shanian. In July 2005, she was filming the Lifetime TV movie Mind Over Murder in Ottawa, during which she met actor Dean McDermott, who was then married to actress Mary Jo Eustace. Spelling and McDermott began an affair the night they met. Spelling and Shanian separated in October 2005. Shanian cited irreconcilable differences when he filed for divorce, which was finalized on April 20, 2006.

Spelling married McDermott less than a month later, on May 7, 2006, in a private ceremony in Wakaya, Fiji. The couple renewed their vows on May 8, 2010, in Beverly Hills, California. They have five children together: three sons, Liam Aaron (born 2007), Finn Davey (born 2012) and Beau Dean (born 2017) and two daughters, Stella Doreen (born 2008) and Hattie Margaret (born 2011).

Spelling anticipated a sizable inheritance from her father's $500 million estate after his death in 2006. The estate was to be divided primarily between Spelling, her brother Randy, and their mother Candy. Candy Spelling was the estate executor, but she and Tori Spelling were estranged. Tori and Randy Spelling each inherited $800,000, although Randy was not estranged from Candy. Candy established a $10 million trust fund for Tori's eldest child. Candy and Tori would not reconcile until 2022, with Candy eventually setting up trust funds for both of her children.

In her sixth book, Spelling It Like It Is, Spelling admitted to having financial troubles due to the cancellation of her reality series, poor real estate decisions, and a difficult fourth pregnancy, during which she was hospitalized for ten weeks. In explanation, Spelling said, "...as my real estate obsession persists, it's starting to look more compulsive. Moving is expensive, and I've put us in a precarious financial situation."

In December 2013, after welcoming their second son, Us Weekly broke the news that McDermott was unfaithful to Spelling. The couple worked through the aftermath of the affair on a Lifetime series titled True Tori.

While Spelling and McDermott's marriage was back on track, the couple once again made headlines in 2016 for owing $39,000 to American Express in unpaid credit card bills. Candy, who was on good terms with her daughter, told TMZ at the time that she was helping out Spelling and her family financially.

In June 2023, McDermott announced that he and Spelling decided to separate after 18 years together in a now-deleted Instagram post.

On March 29, 2024, Spelling officially filed for divorce from McDermott, citing irreconcilable differences. Amid his ongoing divorce proceedings with Spelling, McDermott alleged that his ex-wife earns between $3,000 and $75,000 per month “depending on the job". Their divorce became final on November 3, 2025, with Spelling and McDermott being awarded joint legal custody of their four minor children—Stella, Hattie, Finn, and Beau. However, Spelling has primary physical custody while McDermott was awarded "reasonable custodial timeshare". There will also be no child support. Both will split their minor children's health care expenses equally, as well as each pay half of their kids' extracurricular activities.

== Filmography ==
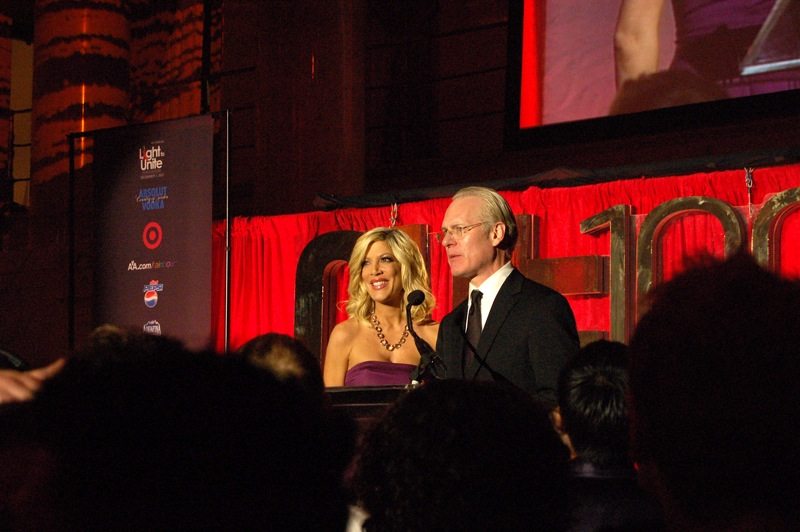
Spelling and Tim Gunn co-presenting at an event in November 2007

=== Film ===
Year	Title	Role	Notes
1989	Troop Beverly Hills	Jamie	
1996	Calls for Cthulhu	Susan	Video short
1996	Mother, May I Sleep with Danger?	Laurel Lewisohn	
1997	The House of Yes	Lesly	
1997	Scream 2	Herself / Stab Sidney Prescott	
1999	Trick	Katherine	
2000	Perpetrators of the Crime	Lucy	
2001	Scary Movie 2	Alex Monday	
2002	Naked Movie	Iris Pytlak	
2003	Sol Goode	Tammie	
2003	Evil Alien Conquerors	Jan (uncredited)	
2004	50 Ways to Leave Your Lover	Stephanie	
2005	Stewie Griffin: The Untold Story	Donna Martin	Voice role
2007	Cthulhu	Susan	
2007	Kiss the Bride	Alex Golski	
2012	The Mistle-Tones	Marci	
2016	Mother, May I Sleep with Danger?	Laurel Lewisohn	
2016	Izzie's Way Home	April	Voice role

=== Television ===
Year	Title	Role	Notes
1981	Vega$	Julie	Episode: "Seek and Destroy"
1983	Matt Houston	Nelli Brant	Episode: "Fear for Tomorrow"
1983	Shooting Stars	Jenny O'Keefe	TV film
1983	Fantasy Island	Christy / Laurie Shannon	2 episodes
1983	The Love Boat	Penny Gibson / Sarah Toomey	2 episodes
1983	Hotel	Lisa Walker	Episode: "Christmas"
1984	T. J. Hooker	Toni Polnoi	Episode: "Grand Theft Auto"
1985	Hotel	Sara	Episode: "Cry Wolf"
1987	Hotel	Jody 'Jo' Payne	Episode: "Barriers"
1989	Monsters	Beverly	Episode: "The Match Game"
1990	Saved by the Bell	Violet Bickerstaff	Episodes: "House Party", "The Glee Club", "Check Your Mate"
1990–2000	Beverly Hills, 90210	Donna Martin	Main role
1992	Melrose Place	Donna Martin	Episodes: "Pilot", "Friends & Lovers"
1994	Burke's Law	Mary McKenna	Episode: "Who Killed the Host at the Roast?"
1994	A Friend to Die For	Stacey Lockwood	TV film
1995	Awake to Danger	Aimee McAdams	TV film
1995	Biker Mice from Mars	Romana Parmesana	Voice role; episode: "Hit the Road, Jack"
1996	Deadly Pursuits	Meredith	TV film
1996	Co-ed Call Girl	Joanna	TV film
1996	Malibu Shores	Jill	Episode: "The Competitive Edge"
1996	Mother, May I Sleep with Danger?	Laurel Lewisohn	TV film
1997	Alibi	Marti Gerrard	TV film
2003	So Downtown	Liz	
2003	A Carol Christmas	Carol Cartman	TV film
2004	The Help	Molly the Dog Walker	Recurring role
2004	Less than Perfect	Roxanne Fielder	Episode: "Claude's Roxanne"
2005	Family Plan	Charlie	TV film
2005	American Dad!	Kim	Voice role; episode: "Stan Knows Best"
2005	Hush	Nina Hamilton	TV film
2005	Mind Over Murder	Holly Winters	TV film
2006	So Notorious	Tori Spelling	Main role
2007–2012	Tori & Dean: Home Sweet Hollywood	Herself	
2007	The House Sitter	Elise Crawford	TV film
2007	Jeopardy!	Herself	1 episode, presenter
2007, 2009	Smallville	Linda Lake	Episodes: "Hydro" & "Infamous"
2008	Mother Goose Parade	Grand Marshall	TV film
2009	Rick & Steve: The Happiest Gay Couple in All the World	Gina Michaels	Voice role; episode: "The Only Straight in the Village"
2009	RuPaul's Drag Race	Herself	Episode 3; guest for the main challenge
2009	90210	Donna Martin	Episodes: "Okaeri, Donna!" & "Between a Sign and a Hard Place"
2011	Jake and the Never Land Pirates	Pirate Princess	Voice role; recurring
2011	Big Brother 13	Herself	Guest appearance
2012	The Mistle-Tones	Marci	TV film
2012	Craft Wars	Herself/host	
2014	True Tori	Herself	Main role
2014	Tori & Dean: Cabin Fever	Herself	
2014	Mystery Girls	Holly Hamilton	Main role
2016	Mother, May I Sleep with Danger?	Julie Lewisohn	TV film
2017	RuPaul's Drag Race	Herself	Season 9, guest judge (1 episode)
2018	The Look All Stars	Host	
2018	The Last Sharknado: It's About Time	Raye Martin	TV film
2019	The Masked Singer	Unicorn/Herself	
2019	Masterchef Celebrity Family Showdown	Herself with Stella Spelling	Episode 2
2019	BH90210	Herself/Donna Martin	Co-producer
2020	Celebrity Show-Off	Herself	Contestant; winner
2021	Overserved with Lisa Vanderpump	Herself	Episode: "Cabo Fiesta"
2021–2022	Messyness	Co-host	
2022	The Masked Singer Australia	Poodle	Guest (one night only)
2022	The Masked Singer France	The cat	Guest (one night only)
2022	Love at First Lie	Herself	Host
2023	The Masked Singer Spain	Harlequin	Contestant (season 3)
2024	Dancing with the Stars	Herself	Contestant (season 33, eliminated episode 2)
2024	House of Villains	Herself	Guest appearance (season 2; episode 6)
2025	Denise Richards & Her Wild Things	Herself	Episode: "Spelling It All Out"

== Discography ==
Title	Year	Other artist(s)	Album
"Enter You"	1999	None	Trick
"We Wish You a Merry Christmas"	2012	Tia Mowry-Hardrict, Melanie Lewis, Tanisha Lang, Sydney T. Sorensen	The Mistle-Tones
"The 12 Days of Christmas	2012	Tia Mowry-Hardrict, Andy Gala, Megan Kathleen Duffy, Jason Rogel, Britani Bateman Underwood, Melanie Lewis, Tanisha Lang, Sydney T. Sorenson	The Mistle-Tones
"All I Want for Christmas"	2012	Britani Bateman Underwood, Melanie Lewis, Tanisha Lang, Sydney T. Sorenson	The Mistle-Tones

== Bibliography ==
Spelling has written six books. Three were published by Gallery Books, while one was published by Aladdin Books and another published by Simon Spotlight Entertainment.

- sTORI Telling (2008)
- Mommywood (2009)
- Uncharted TerriTORI (2010)
- Presenting Tallulah (2010)
- CelebraTORI (2012)
- Spelling It Like It Is (2013)

== Awards and nominations ==
Year	Title	Accolade	Category	Result
1988	Hotel	Young Artist Award	Best Young Actress - Guest Starring in a Television Drama	Nominated
1991	Beverly Hills, 90210	Young Artist Award	Best Young Actress Supporting or Recurring Role for Television Series	Nominated
1991	Saved by the Bell	Young Artist Award	Best Young Actress Guest Starring in a Television Series	Won
1992	Beverly Hills, 90210	Young Artist Award	Best Young Actress Co-starring in a Television Series	Nominated
1992	Beverly Hills, 90210	Young Artist Award	Best Young Actress Guest Starring or Recurring Role in a Television Series	Nominated
1998	Scream 2 The House of Yes	Golden Raspberry Award	Worst New Star	Nominated
2000	Trick	Satellite Award	Best Supporting Actress in a Motion Picture - Comedy or Musical	Nominated
2001	Scary Movie 2	The Stinkers Bad Movie Award	Worst Supporting Actress	Won
