= Tori & Dean: Home Sweet Hollywood =

- Also known as: Tori & Dean: Inn Love
- Genre: Reality
- Created by: Dean McDermott; Tori Spelling
- Starring: Dean McDermott; Tori Spelling
- Country of origin: United States
- Original language: English
- No. of seasons: 6
- No. of episodes: 59

Production
- Executive producers: Dean McDermott; Fenton Bailey; Megan McGuinness; Randy Barbato; Richard Courtney; Tori Spelling
- Production companies: World of Wonder Productions; Life In The Bowl Productions; Oxygen Original Production

Original release
- Network: Oxygen
- Release: March 20, 2007 – January 31, 2012

Related
- Tori & Dean: sTORIbook Weddings

Tori & Dean: Home Sweet Hollywood is an American reality television series that aired on Oxygen from March 20, 2007, to January 31, 2012. The series was titled Tori & Dean: Inn Love for its first two seasons.

== Premise ==
The series follows actress Tori Spelling and her second husband, actor Dean McDermott. The first two seasons follow the couple as they move out of Los Angeles and look for a bed & breakfast to invest Spelling's $800,000 inheritance. Drama ensues as the newlyweds hunt for an affordable inn location, purchase and renovate the inn to match their modern style, manage the inn and attempt to fit in with their new local community of Fallbrook, all while Spelling is eight months pregnant with her son, Liam. The couple named their revamped inn, Chateau La Rue, after Spelling's pug called Mimi La Rue. On April 26, 2007, the Fallbrook Village News reported that Spelling & McDermott did not actually purchase the property, on the August 28, 2007, episode, Tori claimed that they had leased to own.

Season 2 premiered on August 14, 2007, and featured 10 new episodes. The McDermotts leave Chateau La Rue and the bed and breakfast industry.

Season 3 premiered on June 17, 2008, with the new name, Tori & Dean: Home Sweet Hollywood, and broke ratings records for the Oxygen Network, with an estimated 1.4 million viewers. In addition, the episodes were extended from thirty minutes to one hour. In the third season, Tori and Dean have moved back to Los Angeles and are no longer keeping the inn. Throughout most of this season, Tori is pregnant. She gives birth to her daughter, Stella, at the end of the season.

Season 4 of Tori & Dean: Home Sweet Hollywood premiered on May 26, 2009, on Oxygen. The show now follows Tori and Dean as they juggle their careers with being parents to their two children. The season premiere became the most-watched opener among Oxygen's core demographic of women 18-49 in the network's nine-year history.

Season 5 of Tori & Dean: Home Sweet Hollywood premiered on April 5, 2010, with Season 6 premiering on November 29, 2011.

== Episodes ==
=== Series overview ===
Season	Episodes	Originally released	
Season	Episodes	First released	Last released
1	8	March 20, 2007	May 8, 2007
2	10	August 14, 2007	October 23, 2007
3	11	June 17, 2008	August 19, 2008
4	11	May 19, 2009	August 4, 2009
5	10	April 5, 2010	June 7, 2010
6	9	November 29, 2011	January 31, 2012

=== Season 1 (2007) ===
No.	Title	Original release date
1	"Dump Everything You Can Dump!"	March 20, 2007
2	"Too Shaky for the Baby"	March 27, 2007
3	"B&B or Bust?"	April 3, 2007
4	"Paint on the Extensions!"	April 10, 2007
5	"Too Pregnant"	April 17, 2007
6	"I Love a Party"	April 24, 2007
7	"What About the Guests?"	May 1, 2007
8	"Let's Go Have a Baby"	May 8, 2007

=== Season 2 (2007) ===
No.	Title	Original release date
1	"And Li Li Makes 3"	August 14, 2007
2	"Scotland Forever"	August 21, 2007
3	"BBQ or Bust"	August 28, 2007
4	"Can I Get an Amen?"	September 4, 2007
5	"Oh, Canada!"	September 18, 2007
6	"Take Tori Home"	September 25, 2007
7	"Mama Lola Knows Best"	October 2, 2007
8	"Hallelujah Humphrey"	October 9, 2007
9	"Murder at the Chateau La Rue"	October 16, 2007
10	"Fry Me to the Moon"	October 23, 2007

=== Season 3 (2008) ===
No.	Title	Original release date
1	"From Here to Maternity"	June 17, 2008
2	"The Fins and the Furious"	June 24, 2008
3	"Deep Sea Daddy"	July 1, 2008
4	"Lights Camera Liam"	July 8, 2008
5	"Planes, Trains and Contractions"	July 15, 2008
6	"Reading, Writing and Renovations"	July 22, 2008
7	"Poop Beverly Hills"	July 29, 2008
8	"A Stella Is Born"	August 5, 2008
9	"9021---Home"	August 12, 2008
10	"McDermotts Gone Wild"	August 19, 2008

=== Season 4 (2009) ===
No.	Title	Original release date
1	"Look How Far We've Come"	May 19, 2009
2	"Hollywood Movers and Shakers"	May 26, 2009
3	"Tori, May I Ride With Danger?"	June 2, 2009
4	"Faster Than a Speeding Mother"	June 9, 2009
5	"Lights, Camera, Donna"	June 16, 2009
6	"Tori Takes Manhattan"	June 23, 2009
7	"The End of Track Days"	June 30, 2009
8	"Birthday, Bike Blues"	July 7, 2009
9	"Got Mommywood?"	July 14, 2009
10	"How Stella Got Her Gran Back...?"	July 28, 2009
11	"Stellapalooza"	August 4, 2009

=== Season 5 (2010) ===
No.	Title	Original release date
1	"RV There Yet?"	April 5, 2010
2	"Midnight Train to Patsy's"	April 12, 2010
3	"Hollywood Homeys"	April 19, 2010
4	"Fright Where We Belong"	April 26, 2010
5	"Breaking Dad"	May 3, 2010
6	"Wedding Belle Bruise"	May 10, 2010
7	"Homespun Heroes"	May 17, 2010
8	"Me Tarzan, You Change"	May 24, 2010
9	"Return to the Rue"	May 31, 2010
10	"Eat, Drink and Remarry"	June 7, 2010

=== Season 6 (2011–2012) ===
No.	Title	Original release date
1	"Taking invenTORI"	November 29, 2011
2	"Party 911"	December 6, 2011
3	"Secrets of the Baby Bump"	December 13, 2011
4	"Not the Whole sTORI"	December 20, 2011
5	"Coming Clean"	January 3, 2012
6	"The Pregnancy Police"	January 10, 2012
7	"Super Sweet 38"	January 17, 2012
8	"Brothers and Sisters"	January 24, 2012
9	"And Baby Makes Five"	January 31, 2012
