= Tori & Dean: Cabin Fever =

- Starring: Tori Spelling; Dean McDermott
- Original language: English
- No. of seasons: 1
- No. of episodes: 9

Original release
- Release: June 20 – August 15, 2014

Tori & Dean: Cabin Fever is a docu-series starring Tori Spelling, her husband, Dean McDermott, and their four children. The premise of the series is the family heads to Dean's native Ontario to live and experience cottage country as they renovate a cottage.
