= Dean McDermott =

Canadian actor

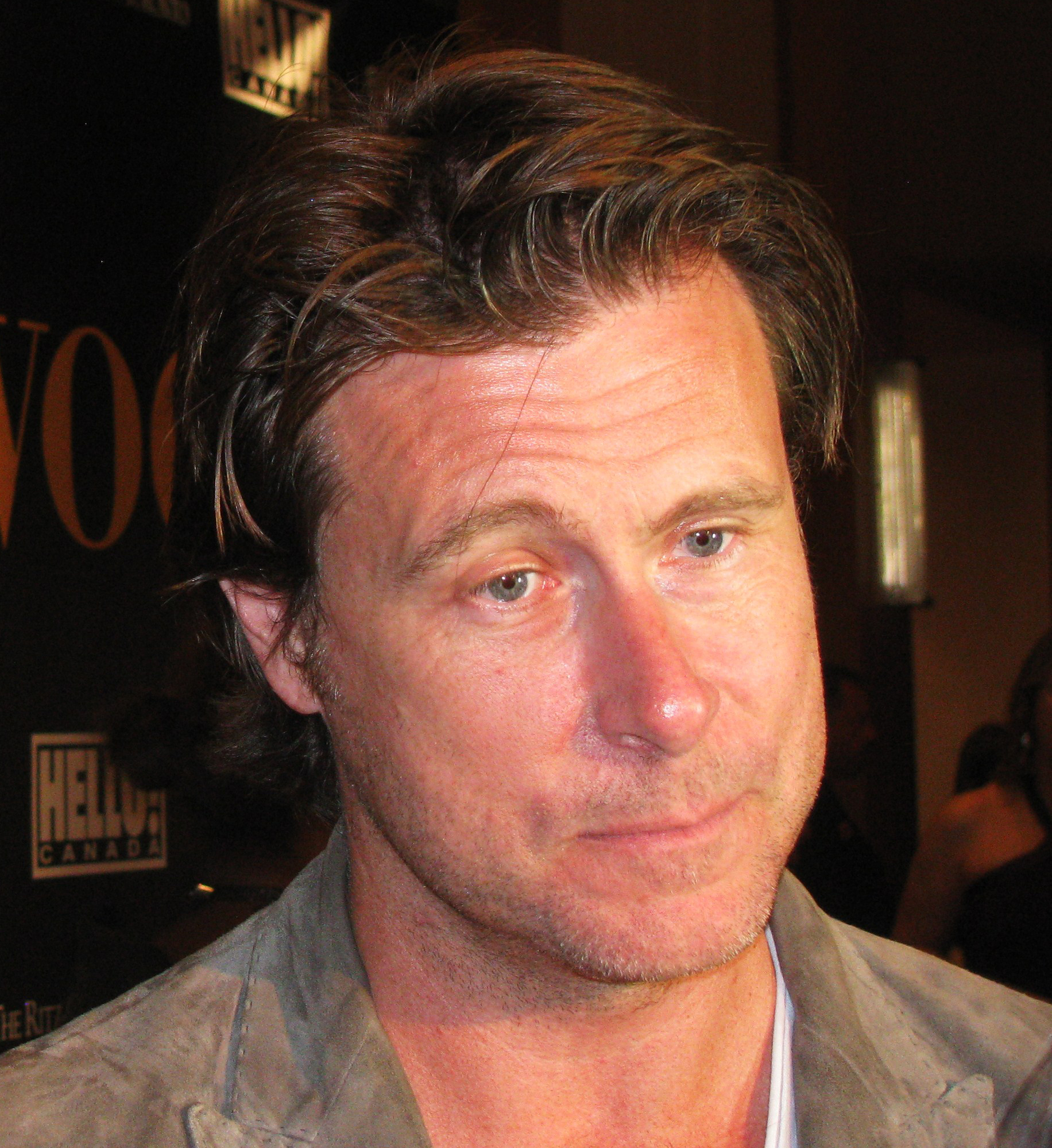
- McDermott at the 2011 Toronto International Film Festival
- Born: November 16, 1966 (age 60); Toronto, Ontario, Canada
- Occupation: Actor
- Years active: 1988–present
- Spouses: Mary Jo Eustace (m. 1993; div. 2006) Tori Spelling (m. 2006; div. 2025)
- Children: 7

Dean McDermott (born November 16, 1966) is a Canadian actor best known as a reality television personality with his former wife, actress Tori Spelling, and as the host of the cooking competition Chopped Canada. He played the role of Constable Renfield Turnbull on the TV series Due South.

== Early life ==
McDermott was born in Toronto, Ontario, Canada, to David and Doreen McDermott. He has three sisters, Dale, Dawn, and Dana. He graduated from North Albion Collegiate Institute in Toronto's Rexdale neighbourhood.

== Career ==
McDermott has performed in films Open Range, Irvine Welsh's Ecstasy and Against the Ropes.

McDermott has appeared in several TV movies including Always and Forever, Santa Baby 2: Christmas Maybe and A Christmas Visitor.

McDermott has had a variety of guest and recurring roles on television series, such as Earth: Final Conflict, Tracker, 1-800-Missing, NCIS and CSI: Crime Scene Investigation. 2016 saw McDermott take on a starring role, portraying Iain Vaughn on Slasher.

=== Culinary arts ===
McDermott is a professionally trained chef. In 2013, he became a member of "Team Guy" on the second season of Food Network's Rachael vs. Guy: Celebrity Cook-Off and was the winner, and in January 2014, McDermott began hosting Chopped Canada on Food Network Canada. McDermott hosted Chopped Canada for two seasons, announcing in March 2015 that he would leave the show.

McDermott released a cookbook The Gourmet Dad, in which he wanted to make intimidating plates more attractive to kids.

== Personal life ==
McDermott's first wife is actress Mary Jo Eustace; they married on July 24, 1993. They have one child, son Jack Montgomery (born October 10, 1998). In July 2005, McDermott began filming the Lifetime TV movie Mind Over Murder in Ottawa, during which he met actress Tori Spelling, who was then married to writer-actor Charlie Shanian. Spelling and McDermott began an affair the night they met. Upon his subsequent divorce from Eustace, McDermott was granted joint custody of their son Jack, opting not to move forward with the adoption of a baby girl, Lola Eustace (born July 7, 2004), whom he and Eustace were in the process of adopting prior to their separation. However, according to recent Instagram posts, McDermott refers to Lola as his “step daughter” and Lola refers to McDermott as her “dad”.

McDermott married Tori Spelling on May 7, 2006, in Fiji. Spelling and McDermott renewed their vows on May 8, 2010, in Beverly Hills. Spelling and McDermott have five children: three sons, Liam Aaron (born March 13, 2007), Finn Davey (born August 30, 2012) and Beau Dean (born March 2, 2017) and two daughters, Stella Doreen (born June 9, 2008) and Hattie Margaret (born October 10, 2011).

On July 1, 2010, McDermott was involved in a dirt bike accident, his second motorcycle accident of the year. He was hospitalized in Los Angeles with a punctured and collapsed lung, and doctors said they expected him to make a full recovery. McDermott was released from the hospital on July 6, 2010.

McDermott became an American citizen at a ceremony in Los Angeles on August 21, 2010.

In December 2013, after welcoming their second son, Us Weekly broke the news that McDermott was unfaithful to Spelling. The couple worked through the aftermath of the affair on a Lifetime series titled True Tori.

On January 23, 2014, a month after the news broke, McDermott's publicist announced McDermott had entered rehab for "some health and personal issues."

While McDermott and Spelling's marriage was back on track, the couple once again made headlines in 2016 for owing $39,000 to American Express in unpaid credit card bills. McDermott's mother-in-law Candy, who was also on good terms with her daughter, told TMZ at the time that she was helping out the family financially.

In June 2023, McDermott announced that he and Spelling decided to separate after 18 years together in a now-deleted Instagram post.

On March 29, 2024, Spelling officially filed for divorce from McDermott, citing irreconcilable differences. Their divorce became final in on November 3, 2025, with Spelling and McDermott being awarded joint legal custody of their four minor children--Stella, Hattie, Finn, and Beau. However, Spelling has primary physical custody while McDermott was awarded "reasonable custodial timeshare". There will also be no child support. Both will split their minor children's health care expenses equally, as well as both pay half of their kids' extracurricular activities.

== Filmography ==
=== Movies ===
Dean McDermott film credits
| Year | Title | Role | Notes |
|---|---|---|---|
| 1988 | Graveyard Shift II | Best Boy | |
| 1990 | Straight Line | John | |
| 1991 | Stepping Out | Young Man at Bar | |
| 1995 | Iron Eagle IV | Major Miles Pierce | |
| 1998 | Bone Daddy | Mort Jr. | |
| 1998 | A Cool, Dry Place | Sheriff Pritchard | |
| 2001 | Picture Claire | Attendant at the Station | |
| 2003 | Open Range | Doc Barlow | |
| 2004 | The Skulls III | Detective Staynor | direct to video |
| 2004 | Against the Ropes | Pete Kallen | |
| 2004 | Touch of Pink | Alisdair Keith | |
| 2007 | Kiss the Bride | Plumber | |
| 2008 | Saving God | Blaze/John Henry James | |
| 2011 | Irvine Welsh's Ecstasy | Hugh Thompson | |
| 2017 | Garlic & Gunpowder | Agent Bean | |
| 2017 | Dead Again in Tombstone | Dr. Goldsworthy | |
| 2023 | My Animal | Coach Dutch | |

=== Television ===
Dean McDermott television credits
| Year | Title | Role | Notes |
|---|---|---|---|
| 1989 | My Secret Identity | Roger | 2 episodes |
| 1989 | C.B.C.'s Magic Hour | Chris Ryan | 2 episodes |
| 1989 | Friday's Curse | Peter | Episode: "Crippled Inside" |
| 1991 | Final Judgment | Young Marty | TV movie |
| 1991 | Conspiracy of Silence | Constable Dutton | Miniseries |
| 1992 | Top Cops | Wasco | Episode: "Steve Sessler/Jerry Smith/Terry Blaylock" |
| 1993 | Sweating Bullets | Tony | Episode: "Feedback" |
| 1993 | Counterstrike | Johnny | Episode: "Clear Cut" |
| 1993 | Exploring Ontario's Provincial Parks | Nick Ward | Miniseries |
| 1993 | Street Legal | Harris Kepler | Episode: "Believe the Children" |
| 1994 | Lives of Girls & Women | Garet French | TV movie |
| 1994 | Wild C.A.T.s | WarBlade (voice) | TV movie |
| 1994 | Sodbusters | Young Destiny | TV movie |
| 1994 | The Forget-Me-Not Murders | Agent Alex | 2 episodes (voice role) |
| 1994, 1998 | Due South | Laurier / Bubba Dean | Episode: "The Man Who Knew Too Little" / Episode: "Doctor Longball" |
| 1995 | Nancy Drew | Mackerin | Episode: "Welcome to the Callisto" |
| 1995 | Bloodknot | Local Boy | TV movie |
| 1995 | Derby | Eric McDowell | TV movie |
| 1995–1999 | Due South | Constable Turnbull | Recurring role |
| 1996 | Critical Choices | Johnny | TV movie |
| 1996 | Jack Reed: Death & Vengeance | Vasili | TV movie |
| 1996 | Kung Fu: The Legend Continues | Sheriff | Episode: "Storm Warning" |
| 1996 | The Outer Limits | Ray Carter | Episode: "Vanshing Act" |
| 1996 | Ed McBain's 87th Precinct: Ice | Tim Moore | TV movie |
| 1997 | Joe Torre: Curveballs Along the Way | David Cone | TV movie |
| 1997 | F/X: The Series | Ted Abbott | Episode: "Reunion" |
| 1998 | Power Play | Mark Simpson | Main cast |
| 1998 | The Wall | Captain Alle1n | TV movie |
| 1998 | Evidence of Blood | Young Harlan Wade | TV movie |
| 1998 | Blood on Her Hands | Detective Steve Nelson | TV movie |
| 1998 | Fast Track | Unknown Role | 2 episodes |
| 1998 | La Femme Nikita | Sykes | Episode: "New Regime" |
| 1999, 2002 | Earth: Final Conflict | Colonel Liam Kincaid / Lt. (later) Capt. Brenton Michaels | Episode: "Message in a Bottle" / 4 episodes |
| 1999 | Mystic Warriors: Guardians of the Legend | Phoenix | Episode: "Cadmus & Europa" (voice role) |
| 1999 | Spenser: Small Vices | Tommy Miller | TV movie |
| 1999 | To Love, Honor & Betray | Nick | TV movie |
| 2000 | Deliberate Intent | Leasure | TV movie |
| 2000 | Rescue Heroes | Sergeant Siren | 2 episodes |
| 2000 | Twice in a Lifetime | Albert Weaver | Episode: "Even Steven" |
| 2001 | Tracker | Detective Vic Bruno | Recurring role |
| 2001 | Stolen Miracle | Ron McKinley | TV movie |
| 2001 | Brian's Song | Ralph Kurek | TV movie |
| 2001 | Loves Music, Loves to Dance | Craig Sheridan | TV movie |
| 2001 | Rough Air: Danger on Flight 534 | Grant Blyth | TV movie |
| 2001 | Relic Hunter | Dash Palmerston | Episode: "Treasure Island" |
| 2001 | The Zach Files | Park Warden | Episode: "What's Eating Zack Greenburg |
| 2001 | Hysteria - The Def Leppard Story | Peter Mensch | TV movie |
| 2001 | WW 3 | Dr. Watson | TV movie |
| 2001 | What Makes a Family | O'Brien | TV movie |
| 2002 | A Christmas Visitor | Matthew | TV movie |
| 2002 | Blue Murder | Sgt. Jim Weeks | Episode: "Spankdaddy" |
| 2003 | 1-800-Missing | Alan Coyle | Main cast |
| 2003 | Wall of Secrets | Mark Emerson | TV movie |
| 2004 | H_{2}O | Clark | TV movie |
| 2005 | Without a Trace | James Costin | Episode: "Viuda Negra" |
| 2005 | The Closer | FBI Agent Stephen Simms | Episode: "The Big Picture" |
| 2005 | NCIS | Lt. Commander Allan Witten | Episode: "Conspiracy Theory" |
| 2005 | Kojak | Detective Dan Riggins | Episode: "Pilot" |
| 2005 | Tilt | Martin Shea | 2 episodes |
| 2005 | The Tournament | Stan Ryckman | Recurring role |
| 2006 | Mind Over Murder | Max Luckett | TV movie |
| 2007 | Housesitter | Philip 'Phil' | TV movie |
| 2007 | Tori & Dean: Home Sweet Hollywood | Himself | Title role (also executive producer, field producer) |
| 2009 | Head Case | Himself | Episode: "The Wedding Ringer" (also additional material) |
| 2009 | RuPaul's Drag Race | Himself | Episode: "Queens of All Media" |
| 2009 | Santa Baby 2 | Luke Jessup | TV movie |
| 2009 | Always & Forever | Michael Foster | TV movie |
| 2010 | Tori & Dean: sTORIbook Weddings | Himself | Title role (also executive producer, composer) |
| 2013 | Rachael vs. Guy: Celebrity Cook-Off | Himself | Main role (Season 2) |
| 2014 | Tori & Dean: Cabin Fever | Himself | Title role |
| 2014 | Chopped Canada | Host | Main role |
| 2014 | True Tori | Himself | Main role |
| 2015 | Hell's Kitchen | Himself | Episode: "18 Chefs Compete" |
| 2016 | Slasher: The Executioner | Chief Iain Vaughn | Main cast |
| 2017 | Slasher: Guilty Party | Alan Hayes | Recurring role |
| 2018 | The Last Sharknado: It's About Time | Gilly | TV movie |
| 2019 | Slasher: Solstice | Dan Olensky | Recurring role |
| 2019 | Badland Wives | Major Fromm | TV movie |
| 2021 | Pretty Hard Cases | Det. Barry Hamm | Recurring role |
