= Co-ed Call Girl =

- Film Poster
- Genre: Drama
- Written by: Allan Leicht and Bonnie Garvin
- Directed by: Michael Ray Rhodes
- Starring: Tori Spelling; Susan Blakely; Scott Plank; Carmen Argenziano; Jeri Ryan
- Music by: James McVay
- Country of origin: United States
- Original language: English

Production
- Executive producer: Paul A. Kaufman
- Producer: Leanne Moore
- Production locations: Mar Vista, Los Angeles, California
- Cinematography: James Glennon
- Editor: Geoffrey Rowland
- Running time: 120 minutes
- Production companies: Citadel Entertainment; The Kaufman Company

Original release
- Network: CBS
- Release: February 11, 1996

Co-ed Call Girl is a 1996 American television film, starring Tori Spelling. It was directed by Michael Ray Rhodes and was first aired at CBS on February 11, 1996.

== Plot ==
A college student is seduced into becoming an upscale call girl.

== Cast ==
- Tori Spelling as Joanna
- Susan Blakely as Teri Halbert
- Scott Plank as Ron Tamblin
- Carmen Argenziano as Henry Binder
- Jeri Ryan as Kimberly
- Charles Grant as Andrew Carlson

== Reception ==
Pop culture website Complex.com included the movie in its list of "The 50 Most Ridiculous Lifetime Movies". Co-ed Call Girl was placed in the 49th position. Lauren Otion, who compiled the list, stated: "If you're in the mood to feel like a horrible person by cracking up at would-be devastating moments (i.e., the creepy piano player that breathily chides a geisha-looking Spelling with one-liners like, "Ron said you like to have a good time!" and "ON THE FIRST NOTE, JOANNA!!" before having her perform the most awkward strip routine ever), this is indeed the movie for you."

The movie debuted in the United States on the CBS network on Tuesday, February 6, 1996. It had an audience of 12.3 million, and was the 60th most watched prime-time network television show of the week. It was soundly beaten by Home Improvement and Frasier. Critic David Bianculli at the New York Daily News called the movie the "Worst Tori ever told," noting "if only ... Spelling had learned from the script as she was learning it, she might have wised up enough to turn down this particular acting job." Bianculli's grudge against the film continued, as at the end of the year he said Spelling's performance "may have been the single worst starring performance on TV". Kirk Nicewonger writing for United Feature Syndicate was also not pleased: "Suffice it to note that Spelling is not convincing as a date-for-hire and even less so as a medical student."

However, Gail Pennington of the St. Louis Post-Dispatch did note that Spelling turned in a "remarkable performance" as she "manages to act dumb enough" to believe her call-girl job will involve "good money, lovely clothes and no sex unless she wants it." Yet, reviewers generally thought her call-girl clothing choices were not very lovely, but instead a "truly horrifying series of costumes."
