= Craft Wars =

American reality show

- Country of origin: United States
- Original language: English
- No. of seasons: 1
- No. of episodes: 10

Production
- Running time: 60 minutes

Original release
- Network: TLC
- Release: June 26 – August 21, 2012

Craft Wars is an American reality game show that premiered on June 26, 2012 on TLC. It is hosted by Tori Spelling and has contestants competing in craft challenges to win a $10,000 prize. The contestants' crafts are judged by Erica Domesek, Stephen Brown, and Jo Pearson (a longtime affiliate of Michaels).

== Episodes ==
No.	Title	Original release date
1	"Summer School"	June 26, 2012
2	"Crafting's a Beach"	July 3, 2012
3	"Barks & Crafts"	July 10, 2012
4	"Altar or Falter"	July 17, 2012
5	"A Christmas Craft-tastrophe"	July 24, 2012
6	"Bedknobs & Gluesticks"	July 31, 2012
7	"Heavy Metal"	August 7, 2012
8	"Trick or Trowel"	August 14, 2012
9	"Blinded by the Light"	August 21, 2012
10	"Pilgrim Plumbing"	August 21, 2012
