= Tori & Dean: Storibook Weddings =

- Genre: Reality
- Starring: Dean McDermott; Tori Spelling
- Country of origin: United States
- Original language: English
- No. of seasons: 1
- No. of episodes: 9

Production
- Executive producers: Amber Mazzola; Dean McDermott; Fenton Bailey; Randy Barbato; Tori Spelling
- Production companies: Life In the Bowl Productions; World of Wonder Productions

Original release
- Network: Oxygen
- Release: April 6 – December 27, 2011

Related
- Tori & Dean: Home Sweet Hollywood

Tori & Dean: Storibook Weddings (stylized as tori & dean: sTORIbook Weddings) is an American reality television series on Oxygen. The series premiered on April 6, 2011. The show follows celebrities turned wedding planners Tori Spelling and Dean McDermott as they turn one lucky couple's wedding from ordinary to an extraordinary Hollywood affair each week.

The series is a spin-off of Tori & Dean: Home Sweet Hollywood.

== Episodes ==
No.	Title	Original release date
1	"Samantha and Steven's Pug Chic Wedding"	April 6, 2011
2	"Emily and Levi's Hollywood Nightclub Wedding"	April 13, 2011
3	"Erienne and Jeremy's Shabby Chic Wedding"	April 20, 2011
4	"Sherine and George's Arabian Nights Nuptials"	April 27, 2011
5	"Brenda and Oliver's Argentine Affair"	May 4, 2011
6	"Christina and Gavin's Tuscan Wedding"	May 11, 2011
7	"Sarena and Eric's Steampunk Soiree"	May 18, 2011
8	"Seema and Nihar's Bollywood Wedding"	May 25, 2011
9	"Ashley and Ryan's Marie Antionette Marriage"	December 27, 2011
