= Stori Telling =

2008 book by Tori Spelling and Hilary Liftin

- Front cover
- Author: Tori Spelling & Hilary Liftin
- Cover artist: Mike Rosenthal
- Language: English
- Subject: Biography, Aaron Spelling, Candy Spelling
- Published: March 11, 2008 Simon Spotlight; 1st Simon Spotlight Entertainment
- Publication place: United States
- Media type: Print (Hardcover)
- Pages: 288
- ISBN: 1-4169-5073-7
- OCLC: 166373027
- Dewey Decimal: 791.4502/8092 B 22
- LC Class: PN2287.S664 A3 2008

Stori Telling, stylized as sTORI TELLING, is a 2008 book by Tori Spelling and Hilary Liftin. Published in March, by September it had risen to #1 on the New York Times Best Seller list for hardcover non-fiction books. In 2009, the book was awarded Bravo TV's A-List Award as the best celebrity autobiography of the year.
