= Charles Grant (actor) =

American actor

- Other names: Charles Flohe, Charles Floye
- Occupation: Actor
- Years active: 1977–1998

Charles Grant, also credited as Charles Flohe or Charles Floye, is an American actor, who portrayed Connor McCabe on NBC's soap opera Santa Barbara from 1992 to 1993. His other soap roles include playing John 'Preacher' Emerson from 1982 to 1984 on The Edge of Night, the first Evan Frame on Another World from 1988 to 1990. He also played Grant Chambers on The Bold and the Beautiful from 1996 to 1998.

Grant began as model with agency Zoe, then appeared in TV commercials and studied acting under Warren Robertson.

He was married to actress Kim Delaney on July 22, 1984. The couple later divorced.

== Filmography ==
- 1982–1984 The Edge of Night as Preacher Emerson
- 1984 Oxford Blues as Student Photographer
- 1985 Rappin' as Duane
- 1986 The Delta Force as Tom Hale, US Navy Diver
- 1986 P.O.W. the Escape as Sparks
- 1987-88 Dallas as David Shulton
- 1988 Brothers in Arms as Dallas
- 1992 Loving Lulu as Sam
- 1992 In the Heat of the Night as David Ritt
- 1994 Lady in Waiting as Scott Henley
- 1995 Silk Stalkings as Rick
- 1995 Kung Fu: The Legend Continues as Rhiner
- 1995 Renegade as Brock
- 1996 Playback as David Burgess
- 1996 Co-ed Call Girl as Andrew Carlson
- 1997 Early Edition as Joe Damski
- 1996–1998 The Bold and the Beautiful as Grant Chambers
- 2001 Reston Hawk: Attorney as Reston Hawk
