= Mary Jo Eustace =

Canadian television personality (b. 1962)

- Born: Mary Josephine Eustace; May 1, 1962 (age 64); Toronto, Ontario, Canada
- Occupations: Actress, model, chef, author, singer-songwriter, comedian
- Spouse: Dean McDermott (m. 1993; div. 2006)
- Children: 2

Mary Josephine Eustace (born May 1, 1962) is a Canadian actress, singer-songwriter, comedian, model, author, and sous-chef best known as co-host of the Canadian cooking TV series What's for Dinner?.

== Early life ==
Eustace was born and raised in Toronto, Ontario. She attended Jarvis Collegiate Institute and McGill University, where she studied English. She later graduated from George Brown College's culinary program.

== Career ==
In 1994, Eustace recorded a solo musical album entitled Bone & Marrow.

In 1995 Eustace appeared on What's for Dinner?, on Life Network, co-hosting with Ken Kostick throughout its run during the late 1990s. From 2000 to 2001, Eustace served as a regular on Canada AM. In April 2007, Eustace reunited with Kostick as the original morning hosts of What's for Breakfast on new Toronto radio station PROUD FM, a station licensed to appeal to the city's LGBT community. She stepped down from the show in June 2008 and subsequently co-hosted He Said, She Said with Ken and Mary Jo, a cooking show similar to What's for Dinner?, which debuted in July 2008 on W Network.

Eustace has also acted, appearing in one episode each of Forever Knight in 1995, The Newsroom in 1997 and Power Play in 2000, as well as the television movie What Kind of Mother Are You? (1996), the feature film That Old Feeling (2000) and the short film Break Dreams (2014).

In 2000, Eustace wrote a cookbook: By My Side with Johanna Weinstein. Eustace wrote about the break-up of her marriage in the book Divorce Sucks: What To Do When Irreconcilable Differences, Lawyer Fees, and Your Ex's Hollywood Wife Make You Miserable which was released in October 2009. In addition to her book about the break-up of her marriage, Eustace also wrote about her personal divorce story in "Palm Springs", an essay contributed to The Other Woman, a collection of stories from 21 women.

On March 3, 2011, Eustace served as moderator for an HBO documentary that aired in 2012. Filming took place at Fellowship Church in Grapevine, Texas. The session discussed sex and cheating on spouses/significant others. The panel consisted of Ed Young Jr. and Noel Biderman.

== Personal life ==
Eustace married actor Dean McDermott on July 24, 1993. They moved to Los Angeles for McDermott's acting career. They had one child (born 1998) and were in the process of adopting a baby girl when McDermott began an affair with Tori Spelling.

After 13 years of marriage, McDermott and Eustace divorced on February 12, 2006, and he married Spelling that May. She later finished the adoption of her daughter (born 2004) as a single parent.

Although McDermott was awarded joint custody of their son, Eustace moved back to Canada with her children. She returned to Los Angeles in 2008 and has been based there since.
