= He Said, She Said (TV series) =

- Also known as: He Said, She Said with Ken and Mary Jo
- Genre: Cooking show
- Created by: Ken Kostick; Mary Jo Eustace
- Starring: Ken Kostick (host); Mary Jo Eustace (host)
- Country of origin: Canada
- Original language: English
- No. of seasons: 2
- No. of episodes: 50

Production
- Production locations: Toronto, Ontario
- Running time: approx. 30 minutes (including commercials)

Original release
- Network: W Network, VIVA
- Release: July 2, 2008 – present

He Said, She Said is a Canadian cooking television show featuring popular Canadian personalities Ken Kostick and Mary Jo Eustace. The show debuted on July 2, 2008 on W Network and currently airs Monday to Friday at 3:30AM, 11:30AM and 1:30PM ET on VIVA. It is produced by Up Front Entertainment and filmed in Toronto, Ontario.

== Premise ==
The premise of the show is that each host cooks a different style dish featuring one common ingredient called the "star ingredient". Along with the main dish, a second dish is also prepared called the "High 5", a side dish that contains only five ingredients.

== What's For Dinner? ==
An earlier cooking show called What's for Dinner? - at the time the highest rated show on its network, also featured the quick-witted, bantering Kostick and Eustace. The earlier show aired for several years in the mid to late '90s.
