= Pancake (surname) =

Pancake is a surname. Notable people with the surname include:

- Ann Pancake, writer and essayist
- Blaire Pancake, beauty pageant winner
- Breece D'J Pancake (1952–1979), author of short fiction
- Brooke Pancake (born 1990), professional golfer
- Cherri M. Pancake, ethnographer and computer scientist
- Chet Pancake (born 1966), filmmaker and musician
- Sam Pancake (born 1964), actor
- Josh Pancake (born 1989), musician

== See also ==
- Pancake (disambiguation)
