= Joe Dietl =

American film director

Joe Dietl is an American actor, writer, director and producer.

Dietl is gay and he lives in Palm Springs, California with Ben Zook, his creative partner in the comedy web series Where the Bears Are. They began their relationship in December 1993.

== Filmography ==
=== Actor ===
Year	Title	Role	Director	Notes
1991	Poison	Man in the Alley	Todd Haynes	
1993	Calendar Girl	Usher	John Whitesell	
1998	Melrose Place	Mover	Charles Correll	TV series (1 Episode : "Buona Sera, Mr.Campbell: Part 1")
1998	The Thin Pink Line	Royce Cannon	Joe Dietl; Michael Irpino	
1999	Can't Stop Dancing	Butch	Stephen David; Ben Zook	
2002	The Drew Carey Show	A Cop	Bob Koherr	TV series (1 Episode : "Drew and the Life-Size Jim Thome Cut-Out")
2006	Rene Turns 40	Jim	Joe Dietl; Michael Irpino	Short
2008	Monk	Stage Manager	Michael Zinberg	TV series (1 Episode : "Mr. Monk Gets Lotto Fever")
2010	Two and a Half Men	Mailman Mike	James Widdoes	TV series (1 Episode : "Fart Jokes, Pie and Celeste")
2010	Big Time Rush	A Director	Savage Steve Holland	TV series (1 Episode : "Big Time School of Rocque")
2010	United States of Tara	DJ	Adam Davidson	TV series (1 Episode : "The Truth Hurts")
2010	iCarly	Jeb Birch	Steve Hoefer	TV series (1 Episode : "iDo")
2011	Better with You	A Mailman	Rob Schiller	TV series (1 Episode : "Better with Skinny Jeans")
2011	The Suite Life on Deck	Clyde Pickett	Bob Koherr (2)	TV series (2 episodes)
2012–2013	Where the Bears Are	Wood Burns	Joe Dietl	TV series (44 episodes)
2013	Maron	Leo	Bobcat Goldthwait	TV series (1 Episode : "Projections")
2013	The Neighbors	Customer	John Fortenberry	TV series (1 Episode : "The Neighbours")
2014	Crisis	Chuck	Greg Thompson	Short

=== Director ===
All of this project involved the actor Michael Irpino at the direction, except for Sorry and Where the Bears Are.

Year	Title	With	Notes
1998	The Thin Pink Line	Jennifer Aniston, Margaret Cho, David Cross, Tate Donovan, Illeana Douglas, Christine Elise, Will Ferrell, Janeane Garofalo, Phil LaMarr, Anne Meara, Joel Murray, Mike Myers, Jason Priestley, Mary Lynn Rajskub, Andy Richter, David Schwimmer, Molly Shannon, Tuc Watkins, ...	
2003	The Mezzos	Joey Diaz	Short
2006	Rene Turns 40	Suzy Nakamura, Oren Skoog, ...	Short
2008	Sorry	Vincent Ventresca, Kevin Chamberlin, ...	Short
2012–2013	Where the Bears Are	Rick Copp, Tuc Watkins, Brooke Dillman, Margaret Cho ...	TV series (50 episodes)

=== Writer ===
Year	Title	Notes
1998	The Thin Pink Line	
2008	Sorry	Short; With Michael Irpino

=== Producer ===
Year	Title	Notes
2008	Sorry	Short
2012–2013	Where the Bears Are	TV series (28 episodes); With Ben Zook and Rick Copp
