= Pancake (disambiguation) =

Pancake is a batter cake fried in a pan or on another hot surface.

Pancake or pancakes may also refer to:

== Art, entertainment, and media ==
- The Pancakes, a music group from Hong Kong
- Pancakes (You're the Worst), the series finale of You're the Worst

== People ==
- Pancake (actress), Thai actress Khemanit Jamikorn
- Pancake (surname)

== Places ==
- Pancake, Texas
- Pancake, West Virginia

== Technology ==
- Pancake engine, a radial internal combustion engine with a vertical crankshaft
- Pancake (slot car), a type of slot car with a vertical shaft and flat commutator
- Pancake lens, a wide-angle or flat lens in photography

== Other meanings ==
- Pancake block, a type of block in American football
- Pancake grip, a grip style used in pickleball
- Pan-Cake, Max Factor's makeup products
- Pancake collapse of a building

== See also ==
- Zeldovich pancake, a theoretical condensation of gas following the Big Bang
