= Black Diamonds: Mountaintop Removal & The Fight for Coalfield Justice =

2006 documentary film

Black Diamonds: Mountaintop Removal & The Fight for Coalfield Justice is a 2006 documentary film made and directed by filmmaker Chet Pancake. The narration in the film is by actress Lauren Graham. The film is about the impact of mountaintop removal mining on the mountains, environment, and people in the Appalachia area of West Virginia.

The film includes interviews of various people living in West Virginia, including Julia Bonds (a West Virginia organizer and activist, who received the 2003 Goldman Environmental Prize), Ken Hechler (an American politician and former West Virginia Secretary of State), and William Saxey (a former director of West Virginia Division of Forestry). Interviews were conducted by the director, or Ann Pancake, and filmed using a digital-video camera.

Ann Pancake, an American fiction writer and essayist, also provided research and consulted in the making of the film. The film soundtrack is acoustical guitar music by Ben Chasny of the musical group Six Organs of Admittance.

Filming began in early 2000, and the completed documentary was released in 2006. The film cost approximately $50,000 to make, and was funded mostly by art grants and the director's money. Pancake did not have a budget to support a film crew.

The siblings Chet Pancake and Ann Pancake were born and raised in West Virginia, and they said this fact helped build trust with the local people they interviewed.

== ISBN Info ==
- DVD ISBN 1-59458-612-8
- VHS ISBN 1-59458-611-X
