= I'm the One That I Want =

I'm The One That I Want
- Directed by: Lionel Coleman
- Written by: Margaret Cho
- Produced by: Lorene Machado
- Starring: Margaret Cho
- Cinematography: Lionel Coleman
- Edited by: Robyn T. Migel
- Music by: Frankii Elliott
- Distributed by: Cho Taussig Productions / Vagrant Films
- Release date: August 4, 2000
- Running time: 96 minutes
- Country: United States
- Language: English

I'm The One That I Want is a concert movie released in 2000. The film captures a live performance of a one-woman show of stand-up comedy, featuring actress and comedian Margaret Cho.

== Premise ==
The film combines elements of storytelling and stand-up. It showcases Cho's unique style of sexually blunt monologue performance. The primary focus of the material is on Cho's ascension into stardom and her struggles with weight, drug addiction and sexual promiscuity. Cho also addresses her failed sitcom All-American Girl, racism, homophobia and other challenges.

== Production notes ==
The performance was filmed at the Warfield Theater in San Francisco on November 13, 1999. The movie was almost universally praised by critics, and it garnered favorable comparisons to the work of comedians like Richard Pryor and Lenny Bruce.

== Critical reception ==
The New York Times wrote "How funny is "I'm the One That I Want?" Several times while watching the movie, which opens today at the Quad Cinema, I laughed until the tears were running down my face."

== Book, CD, DVD and VHS ==
A book of the same name was also released, as well as a compact disc. The CD is a live audio recording of the same performance at the Warfield Theater. There is also a CD version of the book available, and it is read by Cho. The concert film was released on DVD and VHS on October 9, 2001, by Winstar Home Video.
