= Chariton Review =

- Discipline: Literary journal
- Language: English
- Edited by: James D’Agostino

Publication details
- Publisher: Truman State University Press (United States)
- Frequency: Biannual

Standard abbreviations
- ISO 4: Chariton Rev.

Indexing
- ISSN: 0098-9452

Links
- Journal homepage

The Chariton Review is an American literary magazine based at Truman State University in Kirksville, Missouri. The journal was founded in 1975 by Andrew Grossbart. Jim Barnes was the editor from 1976 to 2010.

Work that has appeared in Chariton Review has been short-listed for the Best American Poetry Series and The Pushcart Prize.

Among established writers whose work has appeared in The Chariton Review are David Wagoner, Michael Pettit, James Sallis, Ann Pancake, Gordon Weaver, Jacob Appel and David Lawrence.

== See also ==
- List of literary magazines
