= Can't Stop Dancing =

- Film poster
- Directed by: Steven Falick; Ben Zook
- Written by: Steven Falick; Ben Zook
- Produced by: Joseph Merhi; Richard Pepin
- Starring: Ben Zook; Janeane Garofalo; Margaret Cho; David Cross; Bob Odenkirk; Noah Wyle; Illeana Douglas; Fred Willard; Kathy Griffin; Joe Dietl; Sam Pancake
- Cinematography: Mac Ahlberg
- Edited by: Tony Lambardo
- Music by: Nick Phoenix; Fred Rapoport
- Release date: January 16, 1999 (Palm Springs)
- Country: United States
- Language: English

Can't Stop Dancing is a 1999 feature-length film written and directed by Steven Falick and Ben Zook and starring Ben Zook. The film showed at the 1999 Palm Springs International Film Festival.

== Plot ==
Randy Rubio, a 260-pound (120 kg) leader of a small-time dance troupe, learns that their fifteen-year run at a Kansas theme park is coming to an end. So they pack their bus and move to Hollywood, where Randy's convinced fame and fortune await them.
