= The Thin Pink Line =

- Directed by: Joe Dietl; Michael Irpino
- Written by: Joe Dietl; Michael Irpino
- Produced by: Steve Bulzoni; Brett Nemeroff
- Starring: Jennifer Aniston; Will Ferrell; Molly Shannon; Mike Myers; David Schwimmer; Tate Donovan; Margaret Cho; David Cross; Illeana Douglas
- Music by: Steve Tyrell
- Release date: October 7, 1998
- Running time: 107 minutes
- Country: United States
- Language: English

The Thin Pink Line is a 1998 mockumentary directed by Joe Dietl and Michael Irpino.

The title is a parody of Errol Morris' documentary The Thin Blue Line, which raised questions about the conviction of a prison inmate on death row.

== Premise ==
Mockumentary film about fictional male supermodel and convicted murderer Chauncey Ledbetter.

== Cast ==
- Carrie Aizley as Jocelyn Silverberg
- Jennifer Aniston as Clove
- Alexis Arquette as Mr. Ed
- Andrea Bendewald as Dust
- Megan Cavanagh as Mrs. Ledbetter
- Margaret Cho as Asia Blue / Terry
- Jerry Collins as Tom Phillips
- David Cross as Tommy Dantsbury
- Bruce Daniels as Randall Overbee
- Diane Delano as Sgt. Dot Jenkins
- Tate Donovan as Simon
- Illeana Douglas as Julia Bullock
- Nora Dunn as Sandy Delongpre
- Christine Elise as Darby
- Will Ferrell as Darren Clark
- Janeane Garofalo as Joyce Wintergarden-Dingle
- Melanie Hutsell as Yvette Evy
- Michael Irpino as Chauncey Caldwell
- Bob Joles as Mr. Langstrom
- Laura Kightlinger as Amber Jean Rose
- Phil LaMarr as Jimmy 'Licorice Whip' Wilson
- Anne Meara as Mrs. Langstrom
- Joel Murray as Bartender
- Mike Myers as Tim Broderick
- Taylor Negron as Stewart Sterling
- Brett Paesel as Karen Hill
- Sam Pancake as Randy Nephews
- Jason Priestley as Hunter Green
- Mary Lynn Rajskub as Suzy Smokestack
- Andy Richter as Ken Irpine
- Richard Riehle as Governor Eastman
- Jeff Rosenthal as Donald Elkins
- Robin Ruzan as Tammy Broderick
- David Schwimmer as Kelly Goodish / J.T.
- Rusty Schwimmer as Nora Finkelheimer
- Molly Shannon as Aanl
- Sarah Thyre as Diane Edbetter-Irpine
- Maura Tierney as Suzanne
- Vincent Ventresca as Bob
- Tuc Watkins as Ted
- Susan Yeagley as Chauncey's New Wife
- Joe Dietl as Royce Cannon
