= High Zero =

High Zero is an annual festival, beginning in 1999, of Experimental Free Improvised Music in Baltimore, Maryland, United States. It is hosted by the Red Room Collective, a volunteer group that sponsors weekly concerts in improvised music and experimental theater, film, poetry, etc. in a side room of Normals Books and Records. Since 2001, the festival has been hosted at Baltimore's Theatre Project space.

The festival focuses on non-idiomatic improvisation, vocal improvisation, instrument building, electronics, sound art, and community events. The main theatre-based performances aim to bring together improvisers who typically have never played together previously into novel live situations in front of festival audiences, creating, potentially, a new experience for both audience and performer.

High Zero draws from a large, international base of improvisors of many backgrounds, but traditionally gives half of the invitations for performance to Baltimore-based musicians.

High Jinx, a part of the festival focused on site-specific and community events, is a unique appendix to the festival. Typical events include a musical bike ride, an invented instrument band, a parade through Fells Point, and other outdoor performances.

The festival has yielded six CDs on the Recorded label, each based around a particular performer (in order of release: Carol Genetti, Joe McPhee, Katt Hernandez, Jack Wright, Oleyumi Thomas and Neil Feather), which have, as a result of the festival's format, yielded documents of scarcely documented performers, including John Berndt, Paul Hoskins, John Dierker, Jason Willett, Chet Pancake, James Coleman, Sean Meehan, Michael Johnsen, Jerry Lim, Ian Nagoski, Dan Breen, Dave Gross, Andy Hayleck, Helena Espvall, Evan Rapport, Keenan Lawler, Christopher Meeder, and Jim Baker.

== Notable performers ==
- In 2005, Phil Minton, an internationally known vocal improvisor, performed and directed a Feral Choir at the festival.
