= Chet Pancake =

American musician and filmmaker

- Born: October 10, 1966 (age 60); United States
- Occupation: Filmmaker
- Relatives: Ann Pancake (sister); Sam Pancake (brother)

Chet Pancake is an American filmmaker and musician. He is a co-founder of the Red Room Collective, the High Zero Foundation, the Charm City Kitty Club and the Transmodern Festival. He is currently an assistant professor in the Film and Media Arts Program at Temple University and director of the Black Oak House Gallery. His documentary film Black Diamonds (2006), an examination of mountaintop removal mining, has received a number of awards.

== Personal life ==
Pancake grew up in the areas of Romney, West Virginia and Summersville, West Virginia, and moved to Baltimore, Maryland, in 1993. His sister is writer Ann Pancake, and his brother is actor Sam Pancake. The writer Breece D'J Pancake was also a relative. When he moved to Baltimore in 1994, he found his calling to producing and filmmaking. By producing and film making, his work portrayed exclusive subject matters that gained the publics eyes." Pancake currently resides in Philadelphia, Pennsylvania, with his partner.

== Career ==
In Baltimore, Pancake co-founded the Red Room Collective and High Zero Foundation. He also became a self-trained improvising percussionist and began making films, which ranged from short, experimental meditations to feature-length narratives and documentaries. He was a founding member of the Charm City Kitty Club (GLBT Performance Series) and the Transmodern Festival (Live.Art.Action.)

Pancake currently lives in Philadelphia, where he is an associate professor in the Film and Media Arts Program at Temple University and the director of Black Oak House Gallery.

Beginning around 2001, his primary project was a documentary about the mountaintop removal project of the coal in southern West Virginia and its resulting environmental and humanitarian consequences titled Black Diamonds. Black Diamonds: Mountaintop Removal & The Fight for Coalfield Justice was released by Bull Frog Films for distribution in December 2006.

Pancake received a master's degree in fine arts at the School of the Art Institute of Chicago in May 2012. As recipient of the Edes Foundation Emerging Artist Fellowship, he began the film Genius Project as his Edes Year project. In it he documents five avant-garde artists who identify as queer women: Eileen Myles, Barbara Hammer, Jibz Cameron, Camae Ayewa and Rasheedah Phillips.

In 2012, Pancake began working on Queer Genius, a documentary interviewing and following queer-identifying artists Eileen Myles, Barbara Hammer, Rasheedah Phillips, Camae Ayewa, and Jibz Cameron. In addition to the Edes Foundation, Queer Genius has received support from the Leeway Foundation and Temple University. The film began screening at various festivals and events in 2019, including Women Make Waves International Film Festival in Taipei, Taiwan and the Toronto Queer Film Festival in 2020. Many of the screenings were moved online due to the COVID-19 pandemic. Queer Genius has won awards including “Audience Prize Best Feature 2020” at QFest Houston and "Boundary Breaker Award" at the Buffalo International Film Festival 2020.

In an interview given in 2019, Pancake talked about currently projects, including a short film set in West Virginia that addresses family dynamic and addiction. This will be an addition to the artwork series "Bloodland." He is also working on a larger video project that addresses the emotional and somatic resonances of ecological activism and factors surround fossil fuel extraction on the East Coast of the United States.

== Film and videography ==
- 2006 release, Black Diamonds: Mountaintop Removal & The Fight for Coalfield Justice, DV 72 minutes; screened at the Documentary Fortnight Series at the Museum of Modern Art (MoMA) Feb 2008
- 2009, Jay Dreams
- 2010, bitterbittertears
- 2011, Optical Scores
- 2019, Queer Genius

== Awards ==
- 2002, Maryland State Arts Council Individual Artist Award
- 2006, Key to the city, South Charleston, West Virginia
- 2006, Paul Robeson Independent Media Award
- 2007, Jack Spadaro Documentary Award
- 2007, Silver Chris Award – Best in Science & Technology Division – Columbus International Film Festival
- 2012, Edes Foundation Emerging Artist Fellowship at the School of the Art Institute of Chicago
- 2013, American Composers Forum, Subito grant for Axon Ladder, Bhob Rainey, Catherine Pancake, Meg Foley
- 2014, Pew Center for Arts & Heritage “No Idea Too Ridiculous” grant for Allele Wake, Catherine Pancake, Bhob Rainey, Christina Zani
