= Robin Tran =

American stand-up comedian and writer (born 1986)

- Born: May 13, 1986 (age 40)
- Education: University of California, Irvine
- Spouse: Siege Gary (m. 2013)

Comedy career
- Years active: 2012–present
- Medium: Stand-up; Television
- Genres: Observational comedy; Improvisational comedy; blue comedy; surreal humor; sarcasm; satire; black comedy; roast
- Subjects: American culture; everyday life; human sexuality; pop culture; mental health; religion; gender differences; self-deprecation; gender; Asian American culture; LGBTQ culture; Transphobia

Robin Tran (born May 13, 1986) is an American transgender stand-up comedian, writer, actress, and producer. She is known for her stand-up comedy routines and roasts.

== Early life ==
Robin Tran was born on May 13, 1986. Her parents are Vietnamese immigrants. She was raised in Garden Grove, Orange County, California, and has stated that she grew up in "poverty". She has stated that her father "used to do comedy" and "used to do a Vietnamese radio show in Little Saigon here in California, so he was paid to be funny".

As an adolescent, Tran was influenced by Chris Rock’s Bigger & Blacker comedy special on HBO. She has also stated, "In terms of other people who've been influential, I try to be my own hero."

In 2004, Tran auditioned for her high school talent show and "bombed", but she got into the talent show because "they didn't have enough acts". She ended up receiving a standing ovation and won the talent show. In 2012, she began performing stand-up comedy at open mic nights.

She studied English at the University of California, Irvine.

In 2015, she came out as a transgender woman. She describes her experience coming out to her Vietnamese mother with a language barrier in her stand-up routine, which is known as her "born boy, brain girl" bit. She has said of her experience being the first employee at her then-employer to come out as transgender, "Don't ever be the first employee in your company to ever do anything. It was the worst experience of my life." She refers to herself as an Asian transgender lesbian.

== Career ==
In 2016, Robin Tran released a self-funded comedy special on YouTube, Santa Doesn't Like Every Kid. In 2018, Robin Tran's first one-hour comedy special, Don't Look at Me, was released on Hulu, Spotify, and iTunes. She has appeared on Jeff Ross' Comedy Central series Roast Battle, Comedy InvAsion, OnlyFans TV's The Roast of Whitney Cummings, Logo TV's Logo Variety Hour, Netflix's That's My Time with David Letterman, Fuse TV'sWe Need to Talk About America, The Talk, Howie Mandel & Friends: Don't Sneeze on Me, Netflix's Are You Still Listening?, and Comedy Central's Comedy Central Stand-Up Presents.

She has written for Netflix's Historical Roasts and the Just for Laughs comedy series Straight Up, Stand Up.

Tran has opened for comedians Margaret Cho and Anthony Jeselnik. She has performed at the Outside Lands, Just for Laughs' New Faces of Comedy, Howie Mandel's Just for Laughs All Star Comedy Gala on The CW, Comedy Central's Mental Health Initiative, Moontower Comedy Festival, Netflix's Netflix Is A Joke: The Festival, and Comedy Central's Clusterfest Comedy Festival. In 2023, she performed at the Edinburgh Festival Fringe in Edinburgh, Scotland and headlined the Asian Takeover Comedy Show in Vancouver, Canada. Tran's upcoming festival appearances include the New York Comedy Festival and San Francisco Sketchfest.

In 2021, Tran was named on Just for Laughs' New Faces of 2021 list, and Screen Rant's "10 Up-And-Coming Comedians Who Deserve To Be SNL Cast Members". In 2022, she was featured on Vulture Magazine's annual list, "Comedians You Should and Will Know". She has won three comedy competitions.

She has also appeared on several podcasts, including This Past Weekend with Theo Von, The Todd Barry Podcast, The Margaret Cho, You Made It Weird with Pete Holmes, Queery with Cameron Esposito, Gettin' Better with Ron Funches, and The Pornhub Podcast with Asa Akira.

During the COVID-19 pandemic when live comedy venues were closed, Tran gained a social media following on TikTok, Twitter, and Instagram.

== Personal life ==
Tran has stated that she has bipolar II disorder, agoraphobia, autism, and ADHD. In 2021, she became engaged to her long-term partner Siege Gary.
