= Lauren Graham =

American actress, producer and novelist (born 1967)

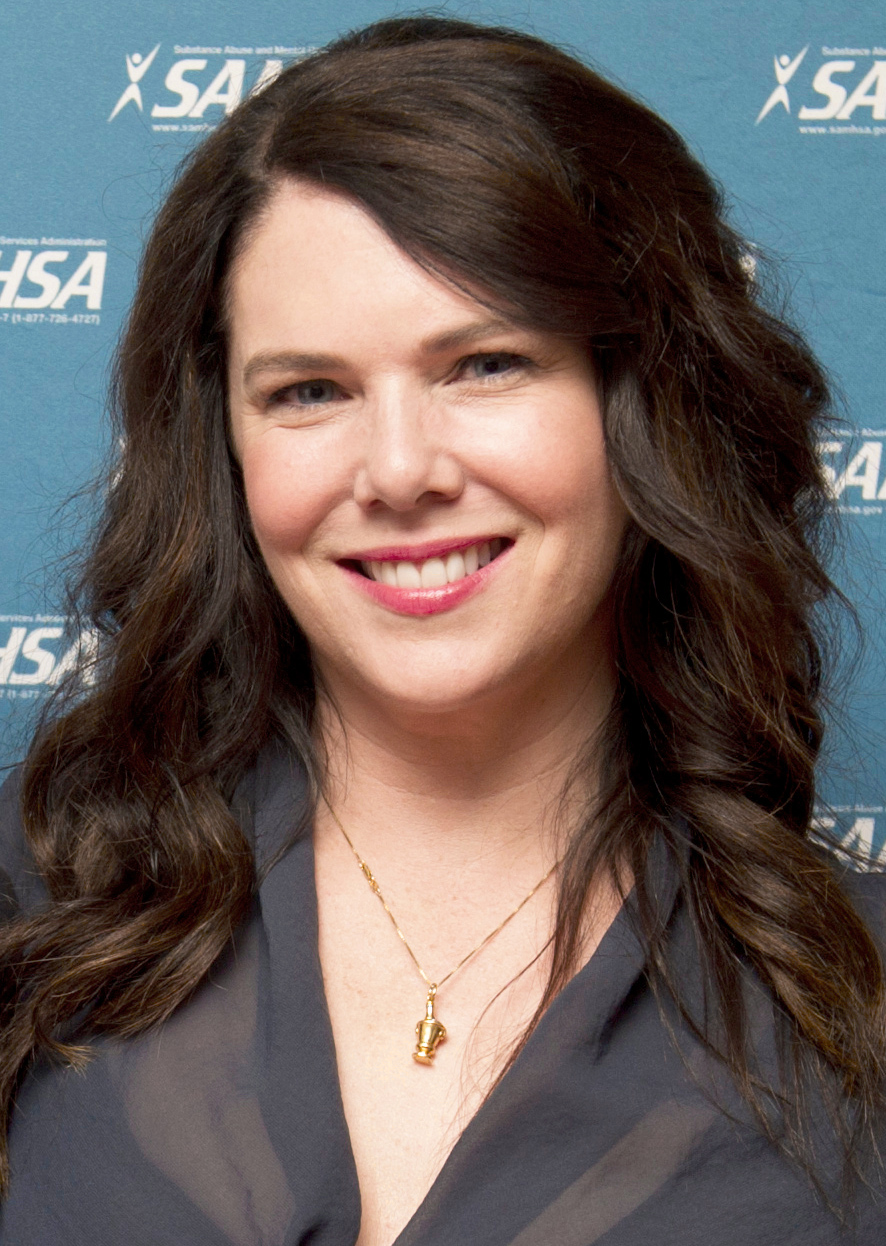
- Graham in 2014
- Born: March 16, 1967 (age 59); Honolulu, Hawaii, U.S.
- Education: Barnard College (BA); Southern Methodist University (MFA)
- Occupations: Actress; author
- Years active: 1993–present
- Known for: Lorelai Gilmore in Gilmore Girls
- Partner: Peter Krause (2010–2021)
- Awards: Golden Globe (nomination); SAG Award (nomination); TCA Award (nomination)

Lauren Graham (born March 16, 1967) is an American actress and author. She is best known as Lorelai Gilmore on Gilmore Girls (2000–07), for which she was nominated for the Golden Globe Award for Best Actress – Television Series Drama, and Sarah Braverman on Parenthood (2010–15). She also appeared in the films Sweet November (2001), Bad Santa (2003), The Pacifier (2005), Because I Said So (2007), Evan Almighty (2007), and Max (2015). In 2013, Graham published her debut novel with Ballantine Books, Someday, Someday, Maybe. In 2016, Graham reprised her role on a Gilmore Girls Netflix revival miniseries A Year in the Life and published a memoir, Talking as Fast as I Can.

== Early life ==
Graham was born in 1967 in Honolulu, Hawaii. Her mother, Donna Grant, was a fashion buyer, and her father, Lawrence Graham, a candy industry lobbyist who was president of the National Confectioners Association. Graham was raised in her father's Catholic faith. She is of Irish descent. Her maternal grandfather was a Baptist minister.

When Graham's father worked for the United States Agency for International Development (USAID) in Vietnam, Graham lived for a few years in Japan. Her mother also grew up there, as the daughter of a missionary.

Graham was five years old when her parents divorced, and she moved to the Virginia suburbs of the Washington, D.C. metropolitan area with her father, who became a congressional staffer. Her mother left to pursue a music career and lived in London until her death in 2005, at the age of 61. Graham was raised by her father, and they had a close relationship. She said, "I thought I kind of had it best. My dad has a very mellow way about him and I was a self-starter as a kid. I liked a certain amount of being on my own. It just worked great for me." Graham also spent a few of her childhood years in Southampton, New York. Graham has a half-sister and a half-brother from her father's second marriage. Her British half-sister from her mother's second marriage, Shade Grant, works at a talent agency.

As a girl, Graham rode horses competitively, but soon switched to acting, honing her talent at Langley High School, where she took part in the drill team and graduated in 1984. She earned her actor's Equity Card in 1988 after two years in summer stock at the Barn Theatre in Augusta, Michigan. Graham went to New York University, then transferred to Barnard College. She graduated from Barnard in 1988 with a Bachelor of Arts degree in English literature. After moving to Texas in 1992, Graham earned a Master of Fine Arts degree in Acting Performance from Southern Methodist University.

== Acting career ==
=== 1994–1999: Beginnings ===
After completing her education, Graham moved back to New York City where she worked as a waitress and as a tutor teaching SAT test prep for The Princeton Review. While she aspired to become an actress, she made publicity appearances wearing the costume of Striker, the dog mascot of the US-based 1994 FIFA World Cup. In 1995, she relocated to Hollywood. She appeared in various commercials for products such as Cascade dishwasher detergent, Dimetapp, AT&T and Lean Cuisine and hosted free preview weekends on The Movie Channel.

Between 1996 and 1997, Graham became a regular guest star on several NBC shows. She played a graduate student who caught the eye of Dick on 3rd Rock from the Sun; Richard's overly optimistic girlfriend on Caroline in the City; and Jerry's speed-dial ranking girlfriend on Seinfeld. She played a Hollywood producer who had a love interest in Detective Rey Curtis in a three-part episode of Law & Order, where she acted opposite Scott Cohen, who later played one of Graham's love interests (Max Medina) on Gilmore Girls. She also portrayed an antagonizing but friendship-starved efficiency expert on NewsRadio.

In addition to her many guest starring and co-starring roles on prime-time television, Graham starred in four failed sitcoms, Townies (with Molly Ringwald and Jenna Elfman); Good Company; Conrad Bloom; and M.Y.O.B., which was burned off by NBC in the summer before the premiere of Gilmore Girls..

In her second film, 1998's One True Thing, Graham appeared as a friend of Renee Zellweger's character. Graham wrote in 2018 that Meryl Streep, who was nominated for an Academy Award for her starring role in the film, told her that "as an actor she thought I was a good listener and oh boy did that feel good."

=== 2000–2008: Gilmore Girls and film roles ===
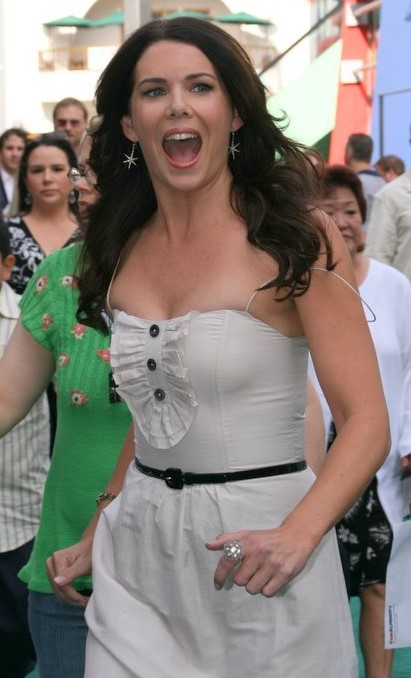
Graham at the Evan Almighty premiere in 2007

In 2000, Graham landed her breakthrough role on Gilmore Girls as Lorelai Gilmore—a witty "thirty-something" raising her teenage daughter in small-town Connecticut. Graham said she felt "really connected to the material" and the script for the series resonated with her due to its complexities: "To me, this was one of the first times that I looked at something and I was like, 'It's serious and it's funny! It's deep and it's light,' especially then, I had never seen before." For her work she received a nomination for Best Actress in a Television Series (Drama) at the 2002 Golden Globe Awards and nominations at the 2001 and 2002 SAG Awards.

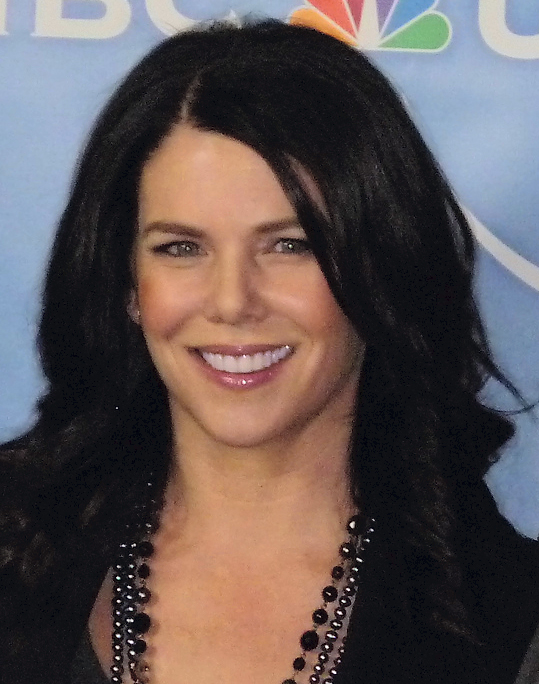
Graham in 2008

Beginning with the Season 7 episode "To Whom It May Concern" and continuing throughout the rest of the season, Graham served as a producer on Gilmore Girls. TV Guide reported that she received the position in an attempt to persuade her to sign for an eighth season. By the series' end, Graham wanted to move on. "I didn't feel we had anything without our creators," she said.

Graham returned to her guest-starring roots when she portrayed herself in two episodes of NBC's Studio 60 on the Sunset Strip. She also appeared in the second season of Bravo's Celebrity Poker Showdown, co-hosted by Dave Foley of Newsradio. After winning her preliminary match, she came in second to another former Newsradio star, Maura Tierney, in the championship game.

Graham's film roles encompass several NYU student films and multiple major studio releases, including Sweet November, Bad Santa, The Pacifier, Because I Said So, and Evan Almighty.

Graham has said that she enjoys playing in short films, and acting in the Williamstown Theatre Festival. She has performed in numerous short films, including the 15-minute-long Gnome. In 2007, Graham signed a seven-figure development deal with NBC in one of the year's richest TV talent pacts. Graham also worked as the voice-over announcer in national advertising for Kellogg's various Special K products in 2007, and for American Express ads in 2008 introducing the Plum Card, which targets small and growing businesses.

=== 2009–2016: Broadway debut, Parenthood and Gilmore Girls reunion ===
Graham made her Broadway debut as Miss Adelaide in the revival of Guys and Dolls, which began preview performances at the Nederlander Theatre on February 5, 2009, and opened on March 1, 2009. Reviews of the production were mixed. The production closed June 14, playing 121 shows and 28 previews.

It was announced in January 2009 that Graham would star in the comedy pilot The Bridget Show (previously Let It Go) for ABC playing a talk show host and self-help guru who fails to follow her own advice during a breakup. The pilot was not given a series order. In September 2009, Graham voiced the character Fran Lockwood, Flint's late mother, in the Sony Pictures Animation film Cloudy with a Chance of Meatballs. In October 2009, it was announced that Graham would replace Maura Tierney in the television series Parenthood as single mother Sarah Braverman. Tierney left the show to seek treatment for cancer. The series debuted on NBC the following year, and ran for a total of six seasons.

In June 2010, it was confirmed that Graham would star in Scream 4, but she left the project on June 30, 2010. In July 2012, Graham was a guest judge in the first episode of Season 10 of the reality television series Project Runway.

In 2015, Graham appeared in the adventure drama film Max, playing the mother of an American Marine killed in Afghanistan who subsequently adopts his Malinois dog. She said she based her character on her grandparents who had different types of strength, and that she felt connected to the film due to many in the film's choir having come from a church her grandfather attended. Ignatiy Vishnevetsky and Joe Neumaier felt her role was too limited. The year also saw Graham beginning to appear recurrently in The Odd Couple, playing Gaby, the former wife of the series' main protagonist Oscar, and appear in an episode of the hidden camera comedy Repeat After Me.

Graham's first film in 2016 was the comedy drama Joshy. Jesse Hassenger and Michael Arbeiter noted her small role in the film. In October 2016, Graham appeared in Middle School: The Worst Years of My Life, playing the mother of Griffin Gluck's character. As a result of her own distaste for parts of her youth, Graham related to the title, sparking her initial interest in participating. That year she also reprised her role as Lorelai Gilmore on Netflix's reunion series, Gilmore Girls: A Year in the Life. Graham said she first realized Gilmore Girls was still the subject of active interest when girls too young to have watched the series when it initially aired approached her during her Broadway debut Guys and Dolls, and admitted to crying while reading the script as she believed "it was just beautiful and fitting and what I wanted it to be and hoped for." She said the project had more support from the beginning than any other she had been involved with, and she continuously teared up out of appreciation for those working on the series and being able to reprise her role.

=== 2017–present: Later career ===
In October 2017, Graham appeared in three episodes of HBO's acclaimed comedy Curb Your Enthusiasm, which returned after a six-year hiatus. She also voices the character Oxana Hauntley in the Disney Junior animated series Vampirina.

From 2020 to 2021, Graham was a featured actress on the NBC show Zoey's Extraordinary Playlist. She played Zoey's (Jane Levy) boss, Joan. From 2021 to 2022, Graham starred as Alex Morrow in The Mighty Ducks: Game Changers, a Disney+ television series based on the 1992 film.

In 2024, Graham and Aisling Franciosi were cast opposite Dylan O'Brien and James Sweeney in David Permut's movie Twinless. Graham also starred in The Best Christmas Pageant Ever.

In 2025, Graham starred in The Z-Suite streaming on Tubi with co-star Nico Santos. In October 2025, she received a star on the Hollywood Walk of Fame.

== In the media ==
Graham has appeared on the cover of numerous magazines, including Health, More, Self, Seventeen, Entertainment Weekly, Redbook, Good Housekeeping, Ladies' Home Journal, and Parade.

== Writing ==
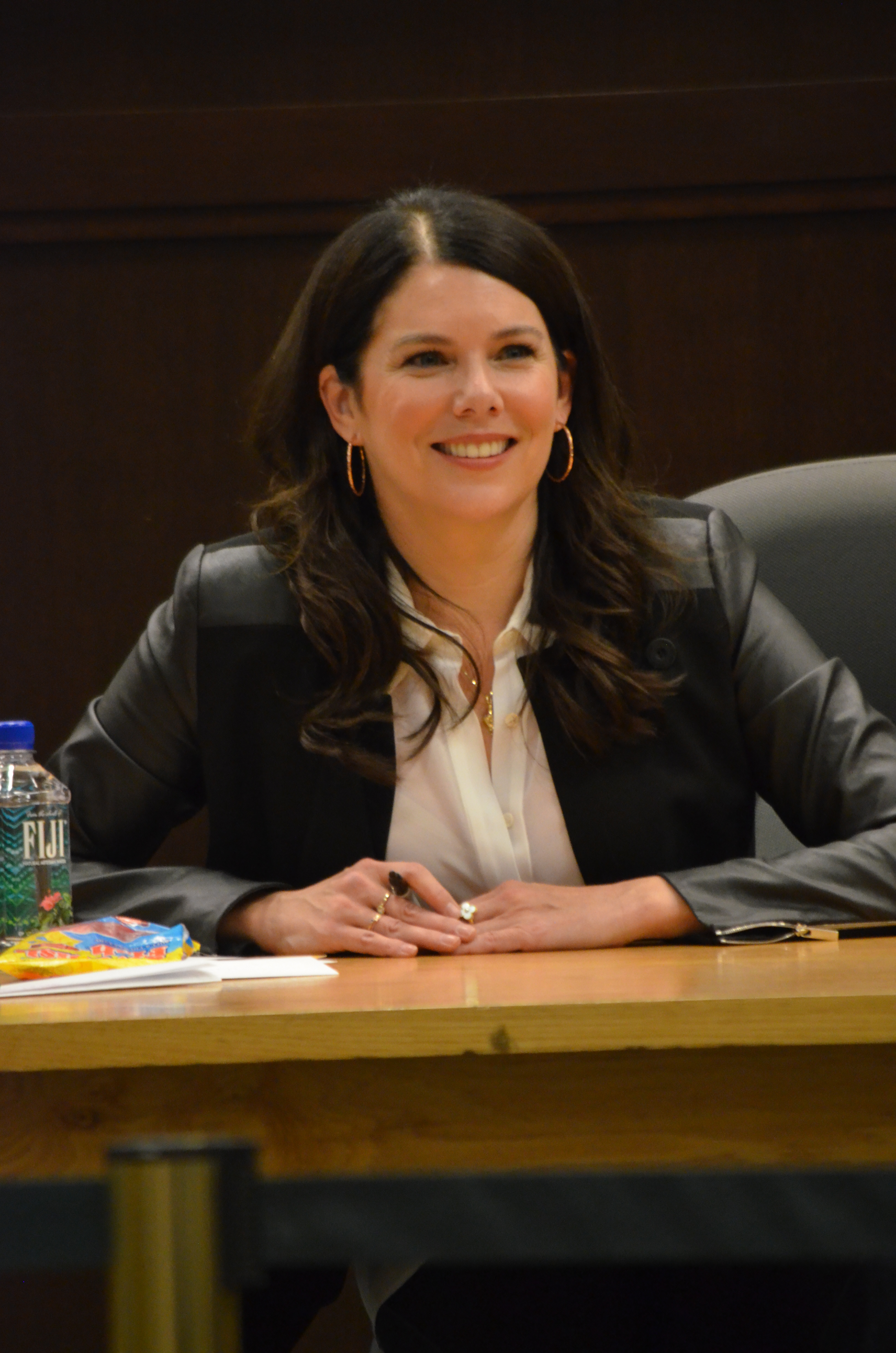
Graham at a book signing in 2013

Graham's debut novel, Someday, Someday, Maybe was released by Ballantine Books (of Random House) on April 30, 2013. The comedic novel is a fictionalization of her experiences trying to become an actress in 1990s New York. In May 2013, the book entered the New York Times best seller list. Graham signed a deal with Warner Bros. Television and Ellen DeGeneres's production company A Very Good Production to adapt it into a TV series. Graham wrote the screenplay for a pilot episode but it was not picked up for filming.

In November 2016, Graham's second book was published: a collection of personal essays titled Talking as Fast as I Can: from Gilmore Girls to Gilmore Girls (and Everything in Between). It was also a New York Times best seller. In November 2022, Graham published a second book of personal essays, Have I Told You This Already?: Stories I Don't Want to Forget to Remember.

Graham has adapted the novel The Royal We into a screenplay for CBS Films; she finished the script in mid-2017. She has optioned the movie rights for the novel, Windfall, by Jennifer E. Smith. Graham's Don't Worry About It focuses on "advice for graduates and reflections on staying true to yourself" and was her third New York Times best seller.

== Personal life ==
Graham was in a relationship with actor Peter Krause from 2010 to 2021. They first met in 1995 when they both appeared in the sitcom Caroline in the City, then became a couple while co-starring on Parenthood. In June 2022, it was reported that the couple had ended their relationship after 11 years together.

In the mid-1990s, Graham was roommates with actress Connie Britton.

Graham owns a house in Los Angeles.

Graham told More that she identified with Catholicism and attends church occasionally.

== Filmography ==
=== Film ===
Year	Title	Role	Notes
1994	Fear of Dogs		Short
1997	Nightwatch	Marie	
1998	Confessions of a Sexist Pig	Tracy	
1998	One True Thing	Jules	
1999	Dill Scallion	Kristie Sue	
2001	Sweet November	Angelica	
2002	The Third Wheel	Woman at Party	Uncredited
2003	Bad Santa	Sue	
2004	Seeing Other People	Claire	
2005	Lucky 13	Abbey	
2005	Life Coach	Dr. Sue Pegasus	
2005	The Amateurs	Peggy	
2005	The Pacifier	Principal Claire Fletcher	
2005	Gnome	Amanda	Short
2006	Black Diamonds: Mountaintop Removal & The Fight for Coalfield Justice	Herself / Narrator	Documentary
2007	Because I Said So	Dr. Maggie Wilder-Decker	
2007	Evan Almighty	Joan Baxter	
2008	Birds of America	Betty Tanager	
2008	Flash of Genius	Phyllis Kearns	
2009	The Answer Man	Elizabeth	
2009	Cloudy with a Chance of Meatballs	Fran Lockwood	Voice role
2010	It's Kind of a Funny Story	Lynn Gilner	
2014	A Merry Friggin' Christmas	Luann Mitchler	
2015	Max	Pamela Wincott	
2016	Joshy	Katee	
2016	Middle School: The Worst Years of My Life	Jules Khatchadorian	
2024	The Best Christmas Pageant Ever	Adult Beth	
2025	Twinless	Lisa	
2026	Reminders of Him	Grace Landry	

=== Television ===
Year	Title	Role	Notes
1993	Loving	Student	Episode #1.2466; debut role
1994	All My Children	Fashion Stylist	Episode #1.6310
1994	Hardcore TV	Penny	Episode: "Rock'em Sock'em Lesbians"
1995–1996	Caroline in the City	Shelly	5 episodes
1996	3rd Rock from the Sun	Laurie Harris	Episode: "Dick's First Birthday"
1996	Good Company	Liz Gibson	Main role
1996	Townies	Denise Garibaldi Callahan	Main role
1997	Law & Order	Lisa Lundquist	3 episodes
1997	Seinfeld	Valerie	Episode: "The Millennium"
1997	NewsRadio	Andrea	4 episodes
1998	Conrad Bloom	Molly Davenport	Main role
2000	M.Y.O.B.	Opal Marie Brown	4 episodes
2000–2007	Gilmore Girls	Lorelai Gilmore	Lead role; also producer
2001	Chasing Destiny	Jessy James	TV movie
2002	Family Guy	Mother Maggie	Voice role; episode: "Road to Europe"
2006	Studio 60 on the Sunset Strip	Herself / Host	Uncredited; episodes: "The Long Lead Story" & "The Wrap Party"
2009	The Bridget Show	Bridget O'Shea	Unsold TV pilot
2010–2015	Parenthood	Sarah Braverman	Main role
2011	The Late Late Show with Craig Ferguson	Geoff Peterson	Voice role; episode: "#8.62"
2012	Go On	Amy	Episode: "Dinner Takes All"
2012	Project Runway	Herself / Guest judge	Episode: "A Times Square Anniversary Party"
2014	Web Therapy	Grace Tiverton	Episodes: "Smile Through the Pain" & "In Angus We Trust"
2014	Hollywood Game Night	Herself / Celebrity player	Episode: "The Pittsburgh Steal-ers!"
2015	The Late Late Show	Herself / Host	February 19 episode
2015	The Odd Couple	Gaby Madison	Episode: "The Audit Couple"
2015	Repeat After Me	Herself	Episode #1.7
2016	Gilmore Girls: A Year in the Life	Lorelai Gilmore	Lead role; 4 episodes
2017	Curb Your Enthusiasm	Bridget	3 episodes
2017	Linda from HR	Linda Plugh	TV movie
2017–2021	Vampirina	Oxana Hauntley	Voice role
2018	The Peter Austin Noto Show	Santa's Helper #8	Episode: "Santas Helpers"
2020–2021	Zoey's Extraordinary Playlist	Joan	Recurring role (season 1), guest (season 2)
2021–2022	The Mighty Ducks: Game Changers	Alex Morrow	Main role; also director
2025	The Z-Suite	Monica Frazier	Main role; also producer

=== Stage ===
Year	Title	Role	Notes
2009	Guys and Dolls	Miss Adelaide	Nederlander Theatre, Broadway

== Awards and nominations ==
Year	Ceremony	Category	Series	Result
2001	Family Television Awards	Actress	Gilmore Girls	Nominated
2001	Screen Actors Guild Awards	Outstanding Performance by a Female Actor in a Drama Series	Gilmore Girls	Nominated
2002	Golden Globe Awards	Best Performance by an Actress in a Television Series – Drama	Gilmore Girls	Nominated
2002	Satellite Awards	Best Performance by an Actress in a Series, Comedy or Musical	Gilmore Girls	Nominated
2002	Screen Actors Guild Awards	Outstanding Performance by a Female Actor in a Drama Series	Gilmore Girls	Nominated
2002	Television Critics Association Award	Individual Achievement in Drama	Gilmore Girls	Nominated
2003	Satellite Awards	Best Performance by an Actress in a Series, Comedy or Musical	Gilmore Girls	Nominated
2004	Satellite Awards	Best Performance by an Actress in a Series, Comedy or Musical	Gilmore Girls	Nominated
2005	People's Choice Awards	Favorite Female Television Star		Nominated
2005	Satellite Awards	Best Actress in a Series, Comedy or Musical	Gilmore Girls	Nominated
2005	Teen Choice Awards	Choice TV Parental Units	Gilmore Girls	Won
2006	Teen Choice Awards	Choice TV Parental Units	Gilmore Girls	Won
2006	Television Critics Association Award	Outstanding Individual Achievement in Comedy	Gilmore Girls	Nominated
2010	Teen Choice Awards	Choice TV Parental Unit	Parenthood	Nominated
2012	Prism Awards	Performance for a Drama Episode	Parenthood	Nominated

== Books ==
- Graham, Lauren (2013). Someday, Someday, Maybe: A Novel. New York: Ballantine Books. ISBN 978-0-345-53275-6. OCLC 964419268.
- Graham, Lauren (2016). Talking as Fast as I Can: From Gilmore Girls to Gilmore Girls (and Everything in Between). New York: Random House Publishing Group. ISBN 978-0-425-28518-3. OCLC 967820013.
- Graham, Lauren (2018). In Conclusion, Don't Worry About It. New York: Ballantine Books. ISBN 978-1-524-79959-5. OCLC 1004837849.
- Graham, Lauren (November 15, 2022). Have I Told You This Already?. National Geographic Books. ISBN 978-0-593-35542-8.
