= Where the Bears Are =

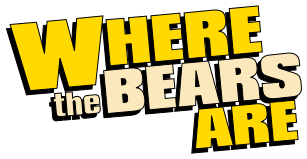
- Genre: Mystery; Comedy; Spy
- Created by: Rick Copp; Ben Zook
- Starring: Rick Copp; Joe Dietl; Ben Zook; Ian Ρarks; Chad Sanders; George Unda
- Opening theme: "Where the Bears Are" by David E. Zukofski
- Composer: David Maddux
- Country of origin: United States
- Original language: English
- No. of seasons: 7
- No. of episodes: 142

Production
- Producers: Ben Zook; Rick Copp; Joe Dietl
- Running time: 7–10 minutes
- Production company: 3 Bears Entertainment

Original release
- Release: August 1, 2012 – November 1, 2018

Where the Bears Are is a comedy-mystery web series that ran for seven seasons from August 1, 2012, to November 1, 2018. The series' creators and writers Rick Copp and Ben Zook star in the series together with Joe Dietl.

Described by the creators as a cross between The Golden Girls and Murder, She Wrote, the series focuses on Nelson (Zook), Wood (Dietl) and Reggie (Copp), three gay, bear friends sharing a house in the Silver Lake neighborhood who, in each season, are drawn into a different murder investigation which plays out as a season-long story arc.

In 2023, a documentary chronicling the series and its popularity, A Big Gay Hairy Hit! Where The Bears Are: The Documentary, premiered at various LGBTQ+ film festivals. During the end credits, the documentary paid tribute to series actor George Unda, who died in 2021, and screenwriter/director of the BearCity films Doug Langway, who died in 2022.

== Cast ==
=== Main ===
- Rick Copp as Reggie Hatch
- Joe Dietl as Wood Burns
- Ben Zook as Nelson Dorkoff
- Ian Parks as Todd "Hot Toddy" Stevens

=== Recurring ===
- George Sebastian as George Ridgemont
- Chad Sanders as Det. Chad Winters
- George Unda as Det. Marcus Martinez
- Tim Hooper as the Chief of Police, Frank Coley
- Scott Beauchemin as Cyril Bowers
- Adam Ridge as Mickey Swift
- Rita Taggart as Doris Dorkoff
- Tuc Watkins as Dickie Calloway
- Mark Rowe as Jeremy Richards
- Brooke Dillman as Honey Garrett
- Mario Diaz as Ramon Santiago

=== Guest appearances ===
Season one

- Jackie Beat as Herself
- Bruce Daniels as Himself

Season two

- Margaret Cho as Mistress Lena
- Karamo Brown as Ronnie Bishop
- Chris LaVoie as Danny Pendleton
- Becky Thyre as Mary Ashley Pendleton

Season three

- Drew Droege as Oscar Butterfield
- Sam Pancake as Alfie Cooper

Season four

- Missi Pyle as Maggie Dexter
- Jeff Bosley as Tucker Fox
- Kevin Chamberlin as Beach Minister

Season five

- Chaz Bono as Gavin Kelly
- Ronnie Kerr as Chase Hansen
- Paolo Andino as Damien Cassidy
- Aaron Aguilera as Crusher
- Perez Hilton as Jax

Season six

- Chris Yonan as Prince Omar Al-Fayeed
- Serdar Kalsin as Rami
- Peter Hulne as Nick Flynn
- Jennifer Elise Cox as Laureen Flynn
- Lou DiMaggio as Toby Marsden

Season seven

- Peter Paige as Bentley

== Season One ==
In the first season, the bears are caught up in a murder investigation when they find a man dead in their bathtub the morning after Nelson's birthday party. The supporting cast also includes Ian Parks, Mario Diaz, Julio Tello, Jesse Meli, Scott Beauchemin, James Parr, Chad Sanders, George Sebastian, Tuc Watkins, Jackie Beat, Brooke Dillman and Bruce Daniels.

This season was presented as a series of 25 episodes, and a special Christmas episode was produced. Subsequently a DVD was released of the series re-edited into a single, continuous film. The DVD also featured the Christmas special as part of its two-disc set, as well as bloopers and outtakes, deleted scenes, a feature-length commentary and behind-the-scenes interviews with the cast and creators.

The first season was named Best Gay Web Series of 2012 by both AfterElton.com and the LGBT blog Queerty.

== Season Two ==
A crowdfunding campaign was conducted for the second season. On January 17, 2013, the second season started production, and fundraising to finish the series continued.

The second season premiered on June 10, 2013, with a plot in which the bears are again caught in a murder investigation when Elliot Butler (Michael Gans), Reggie's former college roommate and a candidate for city council, turns up dead at his campaign launch party. New cast members in the second season include Howie Skora, Chris Lavoie, Mark Rowe, George Unda, Ray Singh, Shannon Ward and Margaret Cho.

== Season Three ==
The third season, again supported by a crowdfunding campaign on Kickstarter, premiered on August 11, 2014. In the 22-episode third season, Reggie is producing a reality television pilot for a true crime series, and the bears consequently try to solve a string of murders involving models for Chunk Studios, a bear porn studio. New cast additions in the third season include Drew Droege and Sam Pancake.

== Season Four ==
The fourth season premiered on August 24, 2015. Inspired by the non-linear structure of the television series Damages, the fourth season starts with the shooting of Todd at his wedding to Nelson, and then flashes back to tell the story leading to the event.

== Season Five ==
The fifth season premiered on September 1, 2016. It breaks from the murder mystery aspects to switch to a spy narrative, focusing this time on Todd Stevens (Ian Parks) as a newly minted spy for his security agency, setting the bears off on a madcap race to keep a dangerous computer virus from ending up in the wrong hands and sniff out a mole from the agency.

Meanwhile, Wood's and Reggie's love life flares out, George gets engaged to a Sporting Wood model, and Reggie dumps Frank Coley.

== Season Six ==
The sixth season premiered on August 31, 2017. It sees another madcap romp, with Nelson on trial for murder.

== Season Seven ==
The seventh and final season premiered on September 10, 2018. It consisted of 16 episodes with the series finale airing on November 1, 2018.

The Bears are called back into action when a bear run Reggie is involved with endures various acts of sabotage, as well as unrelated death threats against the Bears themselves. With the help of Walters, Martinez, Coley and Mickey Swift, they go undercover to find out who's sabotaging the pageant, leading to the surprise return of a scorned former lover. Meanwhile, Nelson and Todd endure a rough patch in their marriage, Reggie's fear of commitment to Rami may break them up, and Wood finds a new bed partner in the most unlikely place, much to George's displeasure.

In 2019, there was a Christmas musical special, described as Hairspray meets It's a Wonderful Life.
