= Pancake engine =

The nickname pancake engine has been applied to several types of internal combustion engine, including:

- Avro Canada VZ-9 Avrocar jet engine
- Detroit Diesel Series 71 (horizontal version)
- Electro-Motive Diesel#EMD 'pancake' diesels 16-184 and 16-338 engines
- Nordberg Manufacturing Company radial diesel engine
- Volkswagen air-cooled engine
