= Brooke Dillman =

American actress and comedian

- Education: University of Missouri (BA)
- Occupations: Actress, comedian
- Years active: 1998–present

Brooke Dillman is an American actress and comedian best known as a series regular on the sketch comedy show Blue Collar TV.

== Early life and education ==
Dillman earned a Bachelor of Arts degree at the University of Missouri in 1988.

== Career ==
While in Chicago, Dillman created several of her favorite characters in the local theater scene, including stints at the Factory Theatre and the Organic Theatre. She then moved to Los Angeles in 1998 and was featured in TV commercials prior to being cast as a regular on the variety series The Wayne Brady Show.

Other roles followed, such as the weather-casting nun, Sister Brenda Trogman, in NBC's Good Morning, Miami, a blind date for Michael Scott in the NBC's The Office episode "Chair Model" from season 4, and a recurring role on HBO's Six Feet Under. Dillman has appeared in the feature films National Lampoon's Barely Legal, Larceny, Pot of Gold, and Superbad. After the final season of the sketch comedy TV series Blue Collar TV, in which she was a regular cast member, Dillman reunited with Blue Collar comedian Larry the Cable Guy in his film Larry the Cable Guy: Health Inspector. She also appeared on the YouTube comedy-mystery web series Where the Bears Are in Episode 7, "A Bear and Honey", as Honey Garrett.

She also has a recurring role in the Disney XD show Kickin' It as Joan Malone, the security guard at the strip mall, and played Tink Babbitt on ABC’s The Middle from 2009 to 2018. Dillman also played a role in Good Luck Charlie as Karen, Amy Duncan's boss and enemy. She also starred for three seasons on the TBS comedy Wrecked as Karen Cushman.

== Filmography ==
=== Film ===
| Year | Title | Role | Notes |
|---|---|---|---|
| 2003 | Barely Legal | Biology / Health Teacher | |
| 2004 | Larceny | Rental Car Agent | |
| 2006 | Larry the Cable Guy: Health Inspector | Brenda | |
| 2007 | Kiss the Bride | Virginia | |
| 2007 | Superbad | Mrs. Hayworth | |
| 2012 | My Uncle Rafael | Francine Lamb | |
| 2014 | Earth to Echo | Diner Waitress | |
| 2015 | 4th Man Out | Martha | |
| 2017 | Take Me | Cathy | |
| 2017 | Dismissed | Valerie Lohman | |
| 2022 | The Bob's Burgers Movie | Reporter / Additional voices | |
| 2022 | Barbarian | AJ's Mom | |
| 2022 | A Hollywood Christmas | Karla | |
| 2024 | Riff Raff | Janet | |

=== Television ===
| Year | Title | Role | Notes |
|---|---|---|---|
| 2000 | Roswell | Diner Customer | Episode: "Crazy" |
| 2001–2002 | The Wayne Brady Show | Various | 6 episodes |
| 2002 | Good Morning, Miami | Sister Brenda Trogman | 9 episodes |
| 2004 | Six Feet Under | Becky | 2 episodes |
| 2004–2006 | Blue Collar TV | Various characters | 42 episodes |
| 2006 | Foxworthy's Big Night Out | Various | 9 episodes |
| 2008 | Nip/Tuck | Jan Tooney | Episode: "Rachel Ben Natan" |
| 2008 | The Office | Margaret | Episode: "Chair Model" |
| 2008 | Point View Terrace | Vicki Mason | Television film |
| 2008 | Childrens Hospital | Blake's Mom | Episode: "A Very Special Episode" |
| 2009 | The Bill Engvall Show | Margie | Episode: "Trash Talk" |
| 2011 | One Life to Live | Bev Altman | Episode #1.11003 |
| 2011–2013 | Good Luck Charlie | Karen | 4 episodes |
| 2011–2015 | Kickin' It | Joan Malone | Recurring role |
| 2012 | The Mindy Project | Laura | Episode: "Hiring and Firing" |
| 2012 | 2 Broke Girls | Sister Fran | Episode: "And the Candy Manwich" |
| 2012–2015 | Where the Bears Are | Honey Garrett | 7 episodes |
| 2013 | Family Tree | Charity Volunteer | Episode: "Cowboys" |
| 2013 | Sean Saves the World | Phyllis | Episode: "Busted" |
| 2013 | TMI Hollywood | Host / Various | Episode: "The Spy Who Was Asleep" |
| 2013–2017 | The Middle | Coach Tink Babbitt | 6 episodes |
| 2013–present | Bob's Burgers | Various voices | Recurring role |
| 2014 | Bad Teacher | Barbara | 2 episodes |
| 2015 | F Is for Family | Lifted Riffs Lead Singer | Episode: "Bill Murphy's Day Off" |
| 2016 | Superstore | Kathy | Episode: "Dog Adoption Day" |
| 2016 | WTH: Welcome to Howler | Mrs. Ofarrell | Episode: "Home for Winter Break" |
| 2016–2018 | Wrecked | Karen | 30 episodes |
| 2017 | Con Man | Bucky | 3 episodes |
| 2017 | The O'ForReals | Mrs. O'Farrell | Episode: "Thankfully Giving Thanks" |
| 2018 | Go! Cartoons | Mayor Maynot / Victorian Lady | Episode: "Pottyhorse" |
| 2018 | Best.Worst.Weekend.Ever. | Six-toed Hoarder | Episode: "Issue 6" |
| 2019 | The Big Bang Theory | Bebe | Episode: "The Inspiration Deprivation" |
| 2020–2023 | Central Park | Various voices | Recurring role |
| 2021 | Chad | Ms. Wroblicky | Episode: "Pilot" |
| 2021 | M.O.D.O.K. | Voice | 2 episodes |
| 2021 | Archibald's Next Big Thing | Mrs. Fowler / Coco | 2 episodes |
| 2021–2025 | The Great North | Various voices | Recurring role |
| 2022 | Big City Greens | Patti (voice) | 3 episodes |
| 2023 | Kiff | Biker Lady, Cheryl, Meryl | 3 episodes |
| 2024 | Megamind Rules! | Carla Magucci / Destruction Worker | Episode: "The Art of Destruction" |
| 2026 | Ted | Mildred Crohn | Episode: "The Mom’s Bombed Rom-Com" |
