= Margaret Cho =

American comedian and actress (born 1968)

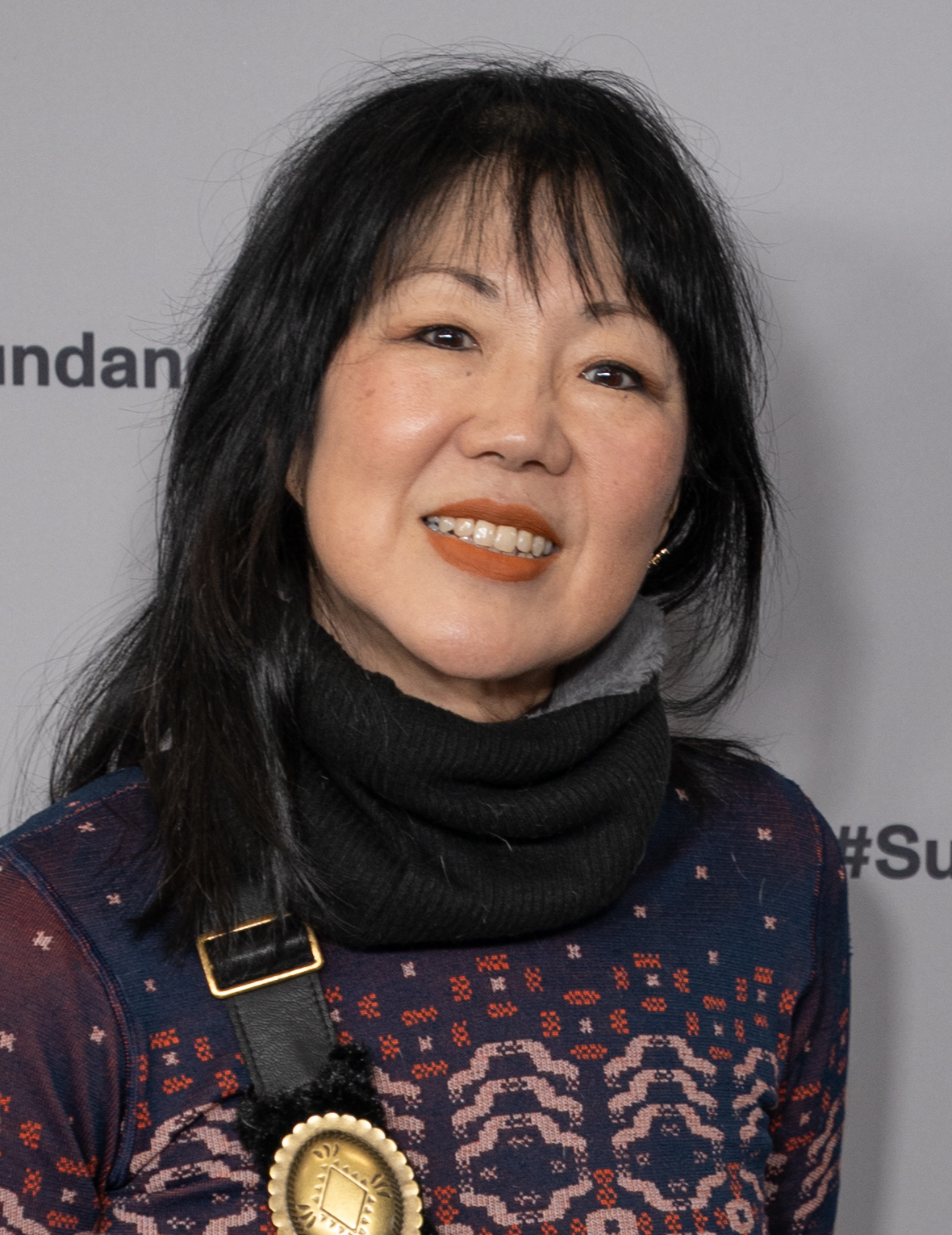
- Cho in 2026
- Born: Margaret Moran Cho; December 5, 1968 (age 57); San Francisco, California, U.S.
- Education: San Francisco State University
- Spouse: Al Ridenour (m. 2003; div. 2019)

Comedy career
- Years active: 1992–present
- Medium: Stand-up; television; film; music
- Genres: Observational comedy; blue comedy; surreal humor; musical comedy; satire
- Subjects: American politics; Asian American culture; LGBTQ culture; pop culture; racism; race relations; current events; human sexuality

Korean name
- Hangul: 조모란
- Hanja: 趙牡丹
- RR: Jo Moran
- MR: Cho Moran
- Website: margaretcho.com

Margaret Moran Cho (born December 5, 1968) is an American stand-up comedian, actress and musician. In her stand-up routines she critiques social and political problems, especially about race and sexuality. She starred in the ABC sitcom All-American Girl (1994–95).

As an actress, she has played such roles as Charlene Lee in It's My Party and John Travolta's FBI colleague in the action film Face/Off. Cho was part of the cast of the TV series Drop Dead Diva on Lifetime Television, in which she appeared as Teri Lee, a paralegal assistant. For her portrayal of Kim Jong Il on 30 Rock, she was nominated for the Primetime Emmy Award for Outstanding Guest Actress in a Comedy Series in 2012.

In 2022, Cho co-starred in the film Fire Island, a portrayal of the LGBTQ Asian American experience on Fire Island.

Cho has worked in fashion and music and owns her own clothing line. She has frequently supported LGBTQ rights and has won awards for her humanitarian efforts on behalf of women, Asian Americans, and the LGBTQ community.

== Early life and education ==
Cho was born in San Francisco on December 5, 1968, to a family of Korean descent. Her paternal grandfather Myung-sook Cho, a Christian minister, worked for the Japanese as a station master during their occupation of Korea. When Japan withdrew from Korea at the end of World War II, he was denounced as a chinilpa, a traitor, by North Korea and forced to move with his family, including his son, Margaret's father Seung-hoon Cho, to South Korea. During the Korean War, Myung-sook ran an orphanage in Seoul.

According to Margaret, she was raised in "a very Christian family." Cho grew up in a racially diverse neighborhood near the Ocean Beach section of San Francisco, which she described as a community of "old hippies, ex-druggies, burn-outs from the 1960s, drag queens, Chinese people and Koreans. To say it was a melting pot – that's the least of it. It was a really confusing, enlightening, wonderful time." Cho's parents, Young-Hie and Seung-Hoon Cho, ran Paperback Traffic, a bookstore on Castro Street in San Francisco. Her father writes joke books and a newspaper column published in Seoul, South Korea.

At school, Cho was bullied, saying that "I was hurt because I was different and so sharing my experience of being beaten and hated and called fat and queer and foreign and perverse and gluttonous and lazy and filthy and dishonest and yet all the while remaining invisible heals me, and heals others when they hear it – those who are suffering right now."

Cho has revealed sexual abuse in her past. Between the ages of five and twelve, she was "sexually molested by a family friend". On an episode of Loveline, she talked about being raped by her uncle while during the same time period he was raping his three-year-old daughter. She often skipped class and got bad grades in ninth and tenth grades, resulting in her expulsion from Lowell High School.

Cho has said she was "raped continuously through my youngest years" (by another acquaintance) and that, when she told someone else about it and her classmates found out, she received hostile remarks justifying it. She was accused of being "so fat" that only a crazy person would have sex with her.

After Cho expressed interest in performance, she auditioned and was accepted into the San Francisco School of the Arts, a San Francisco public high school for the arts. While at the school, she became involved with the school's improvisational comedy group alongside future actors Sam Rockwell and Aisha Tyler.

At age 15, she worked as a phone sex operator. She later worked as a dominatrix. After graduating from high school, Cho attended San Francisco State University, studying drama, but she did not graduate.

== Career ==
=== 1992–1995: Early stand-up and All-American Girl ===
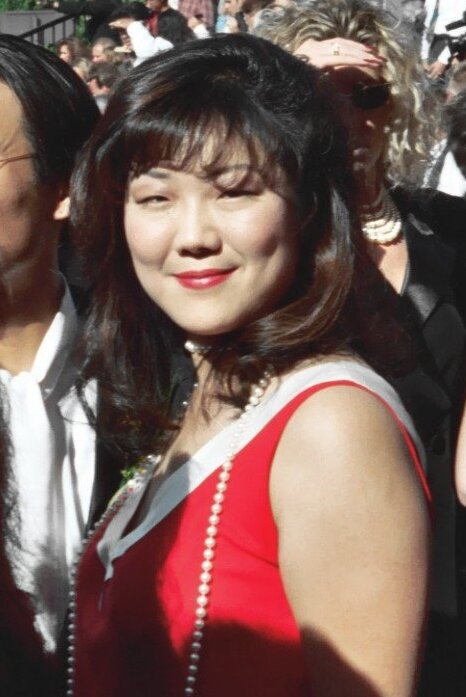
Cho at the 46th Primetime Emmy Awards in 1994

After doing several shows in a club adjacent to her parents' bookstore, Cho launched a stand-up comedy career and spent several years developing her material in clubs. Cho's career began to build after appearances on television and university campuses. In 1992, she appeared on the unsuccessful Golden Girls spin-off The Golden Palace in a small role. In 1993, Cho won the American Comedy Award for Best Female Comedian. In 2010, on The View, she discussed her nervousness about doing The Golden Palace and thanked Rue McClanahan posthumously for her help with rehearsing. She secured a coveted spot as opening act for Jerry Seinfeld; at about this time, she was featured on a Bob Hope special, and was a frequent visitor to The Arsenio Hall Show.

That same year, ABC developed and aired All-American Girl, a sitcom based on Cho's stand-up routine. Cho has expressed subsequent regret for much of what transpired during the production of the show. After network executives, especially executive producer Gail Berman, criticized her appearance and the roundness of her face, Cho starved herself for several weeks. Her rapid weight loss, done to modify her appearance by the time the pilot episode was filmed, caused kidney failure. The show suffered criticism from within the U.S. East Asian community over its perception of stereotyping. Producers told Cho at different times during production both that she was "too Asian" and that she was "not Asian enough." At one point during the course of the show, producers hired a coach to teach Cho how to "be more Asian." Much of the humor was broad and coarse, and at times, stereotypical portrayals of her close Korean relatives and gay bookshop customers were employed. The show was canceled after suffering poor ratings and the effect of major content changes over the course of its single season (19 episodes).

After the show's 1995 cancellation, Cho became addicted to drugs and alcohol. As detailed in her 2002 autobiography, I'm the One That I Want, in 1995, her substance abuse was evident during a performance in Monroe, Louisiana, where she was booed off the stage by 800 college students after going on the stage drunk.

=== 1995–2002: Stand-up, acting, and writing ===
Though her career and personal life were challenging after the show's cancellation, Cho sobered up, refocused her energy, and developed new material. She hosted the New Year's Rockin' Eve 95 show with Steve Harvey. In 1997, she had a supporting role in the thriller film Face/Off starring Nicolas Cage and John Travolta, playing Wanda, one of the fellow FBI agents of Travolta's primary character.

In 1999, she wrote about her struggles with All-American Girl in her first one-woman show, I'm the One That I Want. That year, I'm the One That I Want won New York magazine's Performance of the Year award and was named one of the Great Performances of the year by Entertainment Weekly. At the same time, Cho wrote and published an autobiographical book with the same title, and the show itself was filmed and released as a concert film in 2000. Her material dealt with her difficulties breaking into show business because of her ethnicity and weight and her resulting struggle with and triumph over body image issues and drug and alcohol addiction. Cho appeared in an episode of Sex and the City's fourth season. The episode, titled "The Real Me", first aired on June 3, 2001, and also guest-starred Heidi Klum.

In 2004, the show Notorious C.H.O. (the title was derived from rapper The Notorious B.I.G.) referred to Cho having been reared in 1970s San Francisco and her bisexuality. After completing Notorious C.H.O., she made another stand-up film, Revolution, released in 2004, and subsequently work on her first self-written film in which she starred. Bam Bam and Celeste, a low-budget comedy about a "fag hag" and her gay best friend, co-starred Cho's friend and co-touring act Bruce Daniels. The film premiered at the Toronto International Film Festival in 2005. On Valentine's Day of 2004, Cho spoke at the Marriage Equality Rally at the California State Capitol. Her speech can be seen in the documentary Freedom to Marry.

=== 2005–2010: Other projects and television ===
In 2005, Cho released her second book, I Have Chosen to Stay and Fight, a compilation of essays and prose about global politics, human rights, and other topical issues. Cho launched a national book tour in support of the collection. An audio reading of the book was also released. A DVD of a live taping of her Assassin tour was released in conjunction with the book. The same year, Cho started promoting and touring with her new show, Assassin. The show became her fourth live concert film and premiered on the gay and lesbian premium cable network Here! TV in September 2005. In Assassin, she includes herself when talking about gay people, saying "we" and "our community." Posters for Assassin featured Cho in paratrooper gear and holding a microphone in the style of an automatic rifle, a reference to the infamous 1974 photo of heiress Patty Hearst.

Cho launched "The Sensuous Woman", a burlesque-style variety show tour, in Los Angeles on August 10, 2007, with tour dates scheduled through November 3, as of October 10. Scheduled tour stops meant to follow Los Angeles were Chicago, Illinois and New York City. On August 10, 2007 the San Francisco Chronicle reviewed the show, Cho's work, key events in her personal life and characterized the show thus: "In fact, as bawdy and bad-behaving as the cast gets, the whole show feels more like a crazy family reunion than a performance."

Also in 2007, Cho appeared in The Dresden Dolls' video of their song "Shores of California", and in The Cliks's video for "Eyes in the Back of My Head", in which she appeared as Lucas Silveira's lover. She provided the character voice for a character named Condie Ling on the Logo animated series Rick & Steve: The Happiest Gay Couple in All the World. Her episodes began airing in 2007.

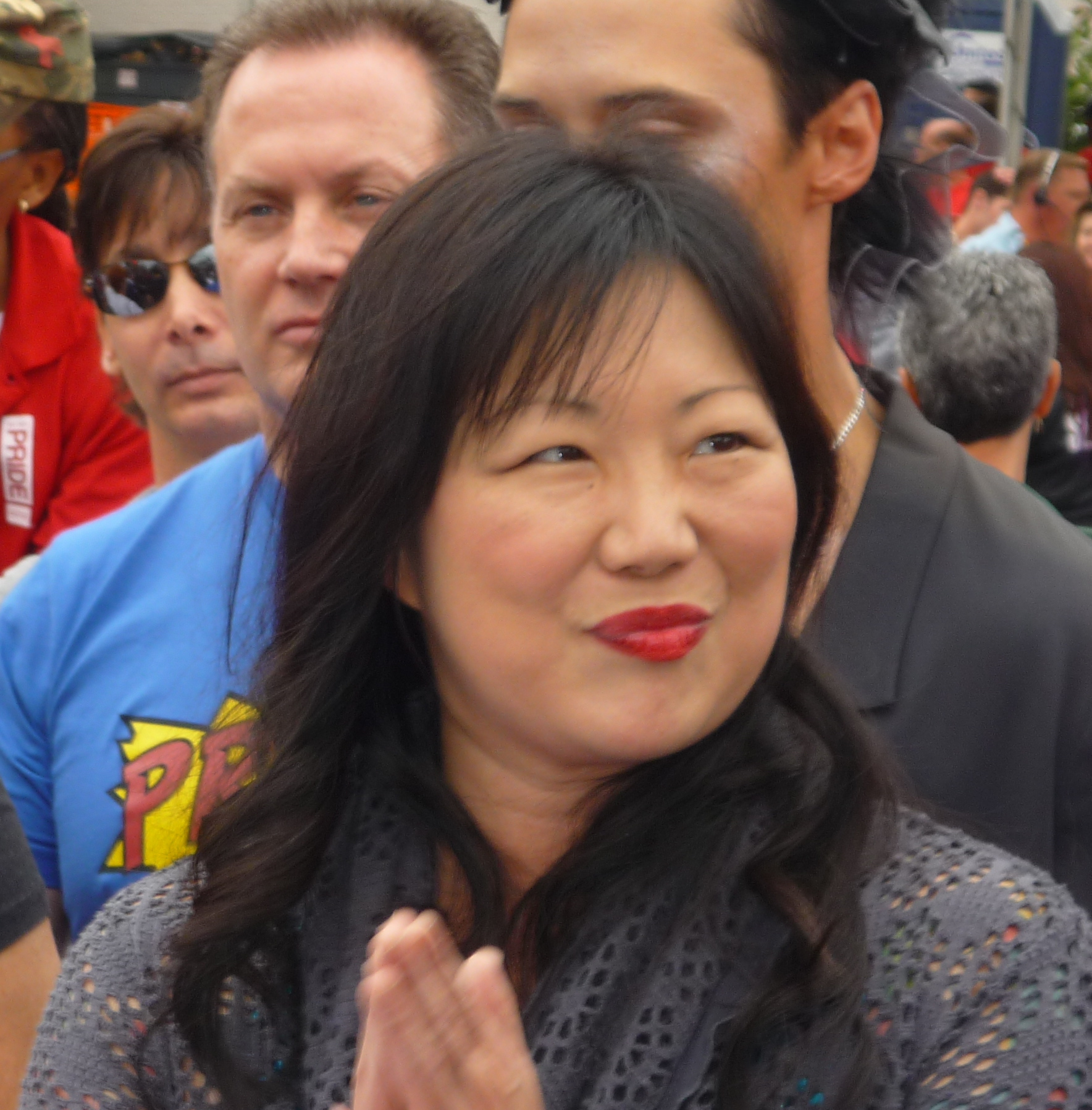
Cho in 2008

The premiere performance of Cho's "Beautiful" tour was on February 28, 2008, in Sydney, Australia as part of the Gay and Lesbian Mardi Gras Festival. Cho was the Chief of Parade for the festival's annual parade along Oxford Street on March 1. During her stay in Sydney, Cho was filmed shopping for parade outfits in a drag store with Kathy Griffin and Cyndi Lauper for Griffin's Bravo series My Life on the D-List. The episode featuring Cho aired on June 26, 2008.

Cho and her family and friends appeared in an episode of NBC's series Celebrity Family Feud, which premiered on June 24, 2008. Later that summer, she appeared in her own semi-scripted reality sitcom for VH1, The Cho Show, which premiered on August 21, 2008 and lasted one season. She next appeared in the supporting cast of the series Drop Dead Diva, which debuted in July 2009.

=== 2011–present: Further appearances and tours ===
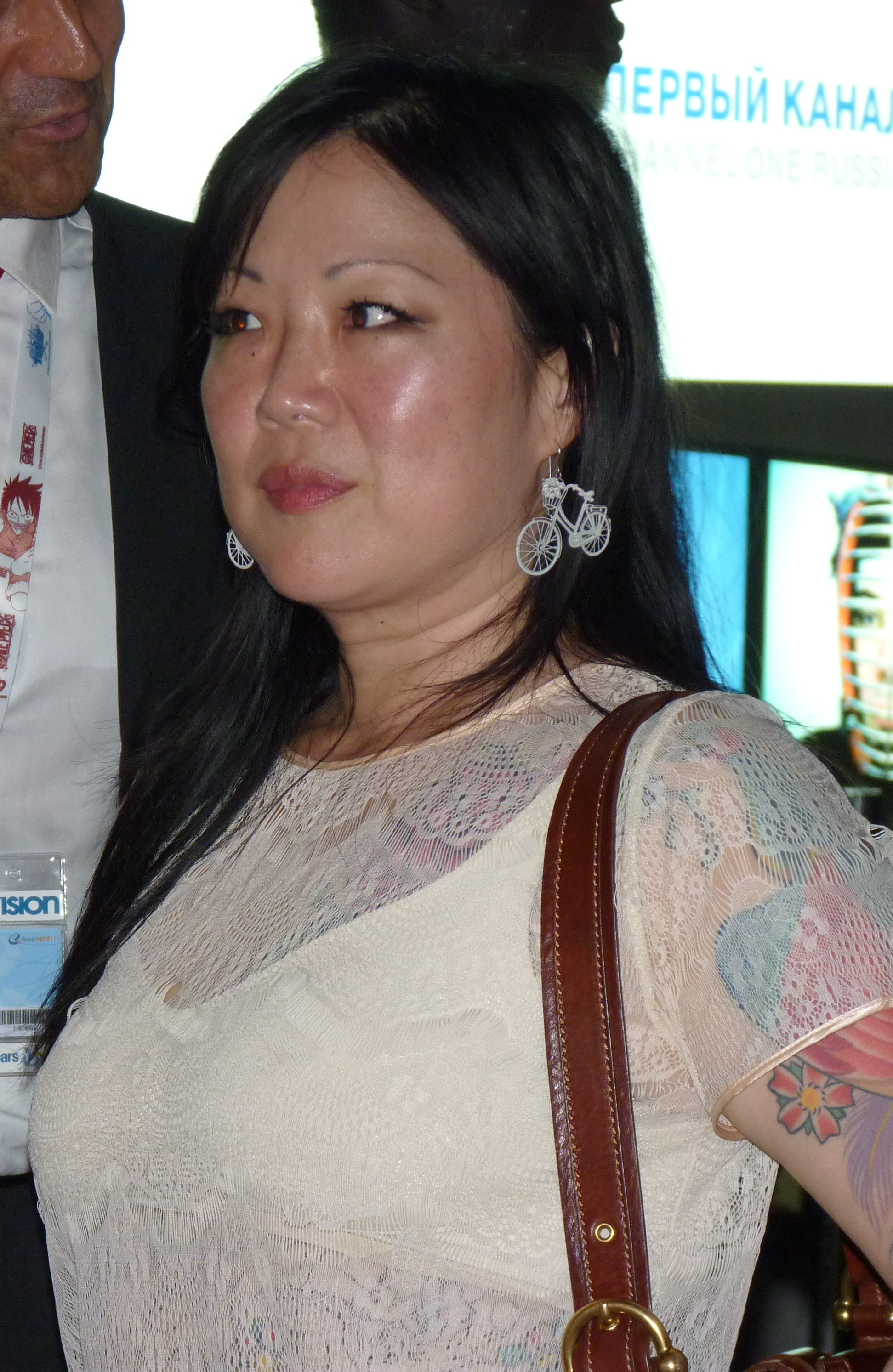
Cho at MIPCOM in 2011

In April 2011, Cho guest starred on the comedy 30 Rock in the episode "Everything Sunny All the Time Always". She portrayed Kim Jong Il, then the leader of North Korea, that required her to speak both Korean and English. She was nominated for a Primetime Emmy Award for Outstanding Guest Actress in a Comedy Series. She later returned to portray Kim Jong Il's son, Kim Jong Un. In 2010, Cho was a contestant on the 11th season of Dancing with the Stars.

Also in 2011, Cho played a lead role in America 2049, a Facebook-integrated game highlighting social inequities in a dystopian future.

Since January 2013, Cho has been the co-host of the weekly podcast Monsters of Talk along with Jim Short. Cho embarked on her "Mother" tour in the fall of 2013 and slated it for engagements in Europe in 2014. The title of the tour refers not to Cho's impressions of her own mother, but to Cho herself. It is her nickname for the figure she has played to her many gay friends over the years. In 2014, she participated in Do I Sound Gay?, a documentary film directed and produced by David Thorpe. The film is about stereotypes of gay men's speech patterns.

In January 2019, Cho competed in season one of The Masked Singer as "Poodle". She was eliminated in Episode 4. In July 2019, Cho started a solo podcast called The Margaret Cho, which features guests who primarily work in show business. Guests have included Queer Eye's Jonathan Van Ness, tattooist and reality TV figure Kat Von D, screenwriter Diablo Cody, drag queen Jackie Beat, and comedian and TV host Michael Yo. Cho has a chapter giving advice in Tim Ferriss' book Tools of Titans.

In February 2022, Cho contributed original poetry to Eating Salad Drunk, a comedian haiku anthology (edited by author Gabe Henry) that benefited Comedy Gives Back, a nonprofit supporting comedians facing financial hardship from the Covid-19 pandemic. In that same month, she was cast in the documentary series Everything's Gonna Be All White, airing on Showtime. In June 2022, Cho co-starred in a romantic comedy film, Fire Island, directed by Andrew Ahn, airing on Hulu.

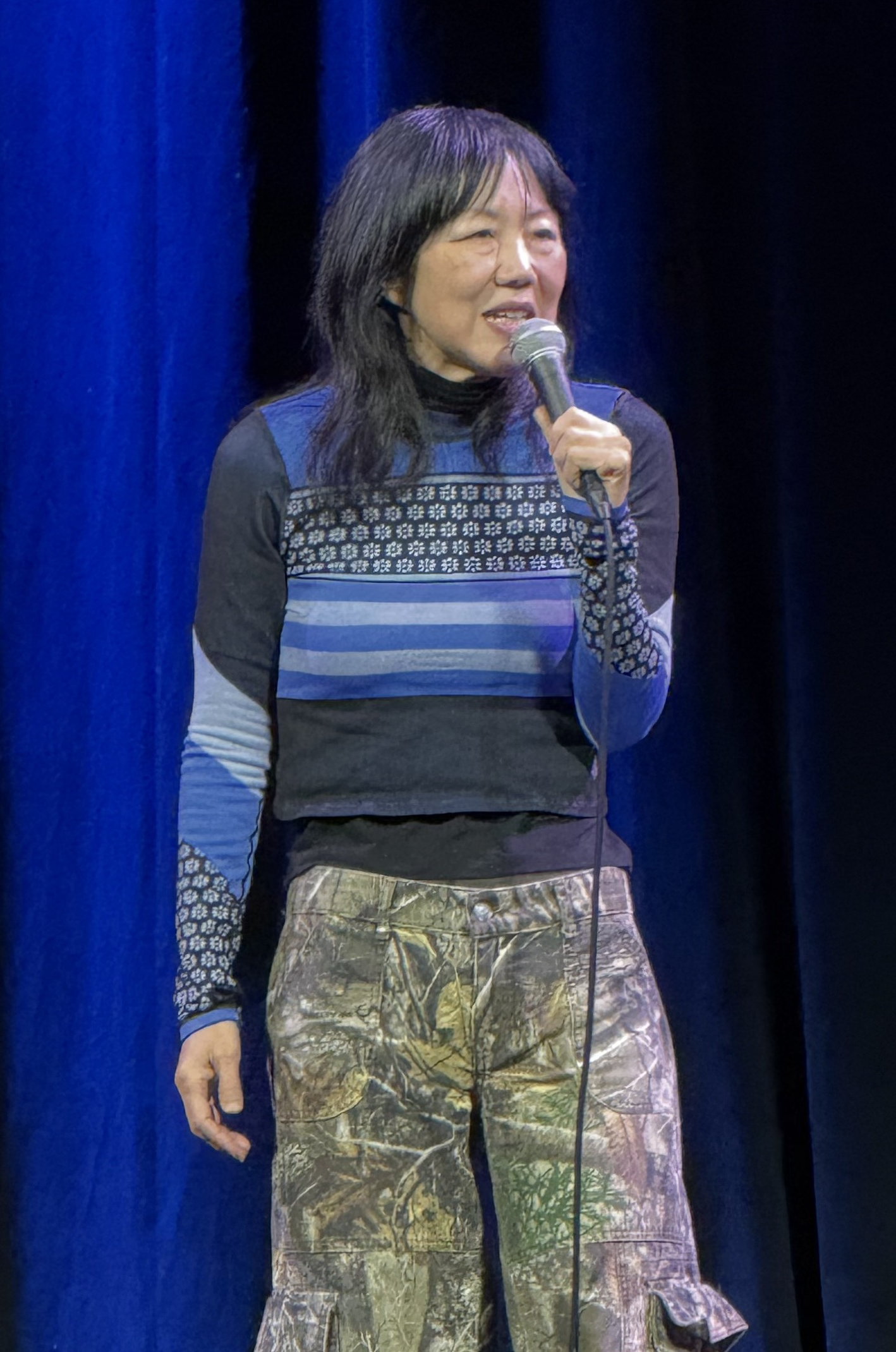
Cho performing on her Choligarchy tour in 2026

In November 2023, Cho was a guest on Today with Hoda & Jenna, as they recounted her career and celebrated her life's work and inspiration to other comedians.

In 2024, Cho alongside Kristen Schaal and Sandra Bernhard were cast as the Gray Sisters in Disney's Percy Jackson and the Olympians.

In July 2025, Cho headlined Belly Laughs, a new comedy and food festival in Los Angeles. In August 2025, Cho began her comedy tour "Choligarchy," which ran until May 2026. Cho states that "Choligarchy" brings her back to her "roots as a political comedian."

On November 3, 2026, Cho joined the cast of the Broadway revival of The Rocky Horror Show as the Narrator.

== Comedic style and political advocacy ==
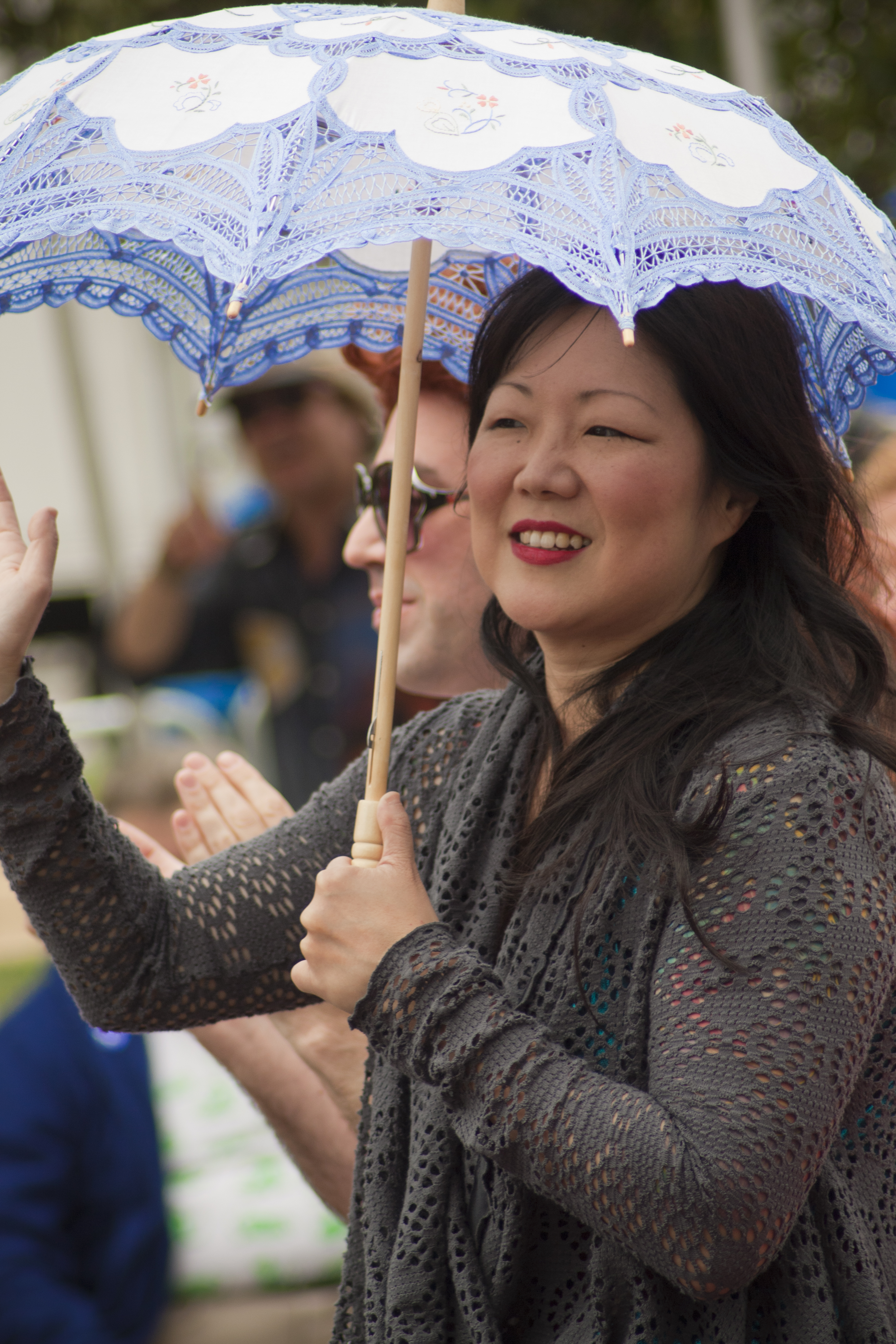
Cho at Los Angeles LGBTQ pride parade in 2011.

Cho has discussed her relationship with her mother openly, imitating her mother's heavily accented speech. Her depictions of "Mommy" have become a popular part of her routine. Cho's comedy routines are often explicit. She has covered substance abuse, eating disorders, her bisexuality and obsession with gay men, and Asian-American stereotypes, among other subjects, in her stand-up routines.

A substantial segment of her material and advocacy addresses LGBTQ issues. In addition to her shows, Cho developed an additional outlet for her advocacy with the advent of her website and her daily blog. When San Francisco Mayor Gavin Newsom directed that San Francisco's city hall issue marriage licenses to same-sex couples in San Francisco in 2004 (until reversed by the state supreme court), Cho started Love is Love is Love, a website promoting the legalization of gay marriage in the United States.

Cho's material often features commentary on politics and contemporary American culture. She has been outspoken about her dislike of former President George W. Bush. She began to draw intense fire from conservatives over her fiercely anti-Bush commentary; a live performance in Houston, Texas, was threatened with picketing. Although protesters never showed up, she held a counter-protest outside the club until security told her she had to go inside.

In 2004, Cho was performing at a corporate event in a hotel when, after ten minutes, her microphone was cut off and a band was instructed to begin playing. Cho claims that this was because the manager of the hotel was offended by anti-Bush administration comments. Cho's payment, which was issued by way of check directly to a non-profit organization, a defense fund for the West Memphis Three, initially bounced but was eventually honored.

In July 2004, during the Democratic National Convention, Cho was disinvited to speak at a Human Rights Campaign/National Stonewall Democrats fundraiser out of fear that her comments might cause controversy. In November 2005, she campaigned to pardon Stanley Tookie Williams, an early Crips gang leader, for his death sentence for four murders, but this campaign failed; on December 13, 2005, after exhausting all forms of appeal, Williams was executed by lethal injection at San Quentin State Prison, California.

In 2007, Cho hosted the multi-artist True Colors Tour, which traveled through 15 cities in the United States and Canada. The tour, sponsored by the Logo channel, began on June 8, 2007. Headlined by Cyndi Lauper, the tour included Debbie Harry, Erasure, The Gossip, Rufus Wainwright, The Dresden Dolls, The MisShapes, Rosie O'Donnell, Indigo Girls, The Cliks, and other special guests. Profits from the tour helped to benefit the Human Rights Campaign as well as PFLAG and The Matthew Shepard Foundation.

On January 25, 2008, Cho gave her support to Barack Obama for the nomination on the Democratic ticket for the 2008 U.S. presidential election. Of the Republican vice- presidential candidate, Governor Sarah Palin of Alaska, Cho said: "I think [Palin] is the worst thing to happen to America since 9/11."

After same-sex marriage was introduced in California in May 2008, Cho was deputized by the City of San Francisco to perform marriages there.

In 2015, Joan Juliet Buck, writing in W about "modern-day femme fatale", compared Cho to other female comedians:

[N]ot all women comedians are dangerous; some are just very funny: Tina Fey and Amy Poehler are too relatable, Joan Rivers was too firmly ensconced in the society that she mocked. Amy Schumer relies a little too much on the word "pussy" to be any kind of threat, though she would like very much to be a bad person. On the other hand, Sarah Silverman and Margaret Cho know no boundaries and inspire palpable fear anytime they begin one of their riffs.

== Other ventures ==
=== Fashion and burlesque ===
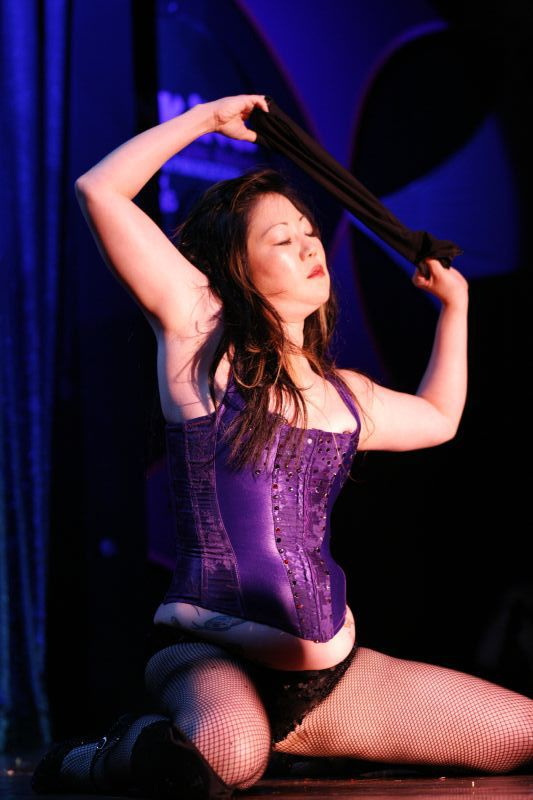
Cho performing burlesque at the 2006 Miss Exotic World Pageant.

In 2003, Cho founded a clothing line with friend and fashion designer Ava Stander called High Class Cho. The company eventually went defunct.

In 2004, Cho took up bellydancing and in 2006 started her own line of bellydancing belts and accessories called Hip Wear; these she sold through her website. She had extensive tattooing done to cover the majority of her back.

In November 2006, Cho joined the board of Good Vibrations, a sex toy retailer. With fellow comedian Diana Yanez, she co-wrote "My Puss", a rap song which they recorded as the duo of Maureen and Angela. Cho appeared in and directed the music video for the song. In December 2006, Cho appeared on the Sci-Fi Channel's miniseries The Lost Room as Suzie Kang.

On an episode of The Hour with host George Stroumboulopoulos, Cho mentioned that she loved Broken Social Scene and wishes to be a part of the band (offering to play the rainstick or the triangle). On air, Stroumboulopoulos called band member Kevin Drew from his cell phone, and Cho made her request to join the band via his voicemail.

In April 2009, Cho was photographed by photographer Austin Young and appeared in a Bettie Page–inspired "Heaven Bound" art show.

=== Music ===
In September 2008, Cho released her single, "I Cho Am a Woman," on iTunes. The song, produced by Desmond Child, was featured on her VH1 series.

Throughout 2010, she worked on a full-length album, going through the titles "Guitarded" and "Banjovi" before finally settling on Cho Dependent. Released on August 24, 2010, the album was supported by music videos for "I'm Sorry," "Eat Shit and Die," and "My Lil' Wayne;" Liam Kyle Sullivan directed the first two. It was nominated for a 2010 Grammy award for Best Comedy Album. In 2011, Showtime released a stand-up comedy special, titled Margaret Cho: Cho Dependent, which featured musical performances from the album.

In May 2010, Cho directed and appeared in the music video for "I Wanna Be a Bear", a song by Pixie Herculon, a pseudonym of Jill Sobule. In 2011, Cho sang the Bob Mould song "Your Favorite Thing" at the tribute concert See A Little Light with Grant-Lee Phillips. In the same year, she appeared in some of Liam Kyle Sullivan's YouTube videos.

In July 2014, she appeared in "Weird Al" Yankovic's music video for "Tacky."

In April 2016, Cho released her second album, American Myth.

In May 2016, she rapped on and made an appearance in the music video for "Green Tea", a song by rapper Awkwafina. The video plays with stereotypes of people of East Asian descent; Awkwafina said she hoped it would encourage women of color "to embrace their quirkiness, their sexuality, their inner-child and their creativity with passion."

Also in 2016, Cho was featured on the track "Ride or Die" on the album Sweet T by American drag queen and singer/artist Ginger Minj.

On December 6, 2024 Cho released the single "Lucky Gift". Produced by Garrison Starr, the track went out to digital platforms in advance of Cho's forthcoming album of the same name.

=== Podcast ===
In July 2019, Cho started a podcast called The Margaret Cho. It features guests who primarily work in show business and features original music by Garrison Starr.

== Personal life ==
Cho married Al Ridenour, an artist involved in The Cacophony Society and the Art of Bleeding, in 2003. Cho was featured in an Art of Bleeding performance in March 2006. She described her marriage as "very conventional and conservative, I think. I mean we're such weird people that people just can't imagine that we would have a conventional marriage. But yeah, we are very conventional." They separated in September 2014, and Cho confirmed their separation in December. Cho referred to herself as "divorced" in an April 2015 profile in The New York Times, but actually filed for divorce in August 2015. In April 2019, it was reported that the divorce was finalized.

In the early 1990s, Cho dated director Quentin Tarantino. She also dated musician Chris Isaak.

As of 2008, in a profanity-laced blog post, Cho self-identified as a Christian, although she does not agree with nor align ideologically with mainstream Christianity.

As of 2009, Cho was living in Peachtree City, Georgia, as Drop Dead Diva was filmed in the Atlanta area.

Cho is openly bisexual and has stated that she has "a lot of experience in the area of polyamory and alternative sexuality in general." When discussing her sexuality in a 2018 Huffington Post interview, Cho said, "I don't know using 'bisexual' is right because that indicates there's only two genders and I don't believe that. I've been with people all across the spectrum of gender and who have all kinds of different expressions of gender so it's so hard to say. Maybe 'pansexual' is technically the more correct term but I like 'bisexual' because it's kind of '70s." Cho states that she "loves" Fire Island and spends summers there. She first learned about sexuality in the 1970s from her parents, who had bought a gay bookstore. In the 1980s, she identified as a lesbian, saying the title at that time had the stereotype of "wearing jean shorts, Doc Martens, a bike chain, a messenger bag and a portable CD player spinning Ani DiFranco".

Cho was a guest on comedian Bobby Lee's Tigerbelly Podcast Episode 71, which was uploaded on December 16, 2016. In that episode, she recounted an incident between her and actress Tilda Swinton. According to Cho, Swinton contacted her via email to discuss the Asian American community's reaction to the news that Swinton had been cast to play the Ancient One, who in comic books is Tibetan, in the film Doctor Strange. Cho found the inquiry odd, since she did not know Swinton and had never talked to her before nor did she have anything to do with the film or casting. On December 21, Swinton released the email exchange between her and Cho to the website Jezebel. According to Swinton, she had contacted Cho to better understand why Asian Americans were upset about the casting. In response to the release, Cho stated that she stands by her words both on TigerBelly and in the email exchange.

Cho revealed in a panel discussion that after doing genealogy testing, she discovered that she had some Chinese ancestry.

== Accolades ==
- In 2000, her "E! Celebrity Profile" won a Gracie Allen Award from the American Women in Radio and Television organization acknowledging its "superior quality and effective portrayal of the changing roles and concerns of women."
- The same year, the Gay & Lesbian Alliance Against Defamation (GLAAD) awarded her with a Golden Gate Award and described her as an entertainer who, "as a pioneer, has made a significant difference in promoting equal rights for all, regardless of sexual orientation or gender identity."
- In 2001, she was given a Lambda Liberty Award by Lambda Legal for "pressing us to see how false constructions of race, sexuality, and gender operate similarly to obscure and demean identity."
- In 2003, she was given an Intrepid Award by the National Organization for Women.
- In 2004, she was awarded with the First Amendment Award from the American Civil Liberties Union.
- In 2007, she won for Outstanding Comedy Performance in AZN's Asian Excellence Awards.
- April 30, 2008 was declared "Margaret Cho Day" in San Francisco.

== Tours ==
- "I'm the One That I Want" (1999)
- "Notorious C.H.O." (2002)
- "Revolution" (2003)
- "State of Emergency" (2004)
- "Assassin" (2005)
- "True Colors" (2007–2008)
- "Beautiful" (2008)
- "Cho Dependent" (2010)
- "Mother!" (2013)
- "The 'There's No I in Team but there is a Cho in PsyCHO' Tour" (Often referred to simply as "The PsyCHO Tour") (2015)
- "Fresh Off the Bloat Tour" (2017)
- "Choligarchy" (2025-2026)

== Filmography ==
=== Film ===
Year	Title	Role	Notes/Ref.
1994	Angie	Admissions Nurse No. 2	
1995	The Doom Generation	Mrs. Nguyen	
1996	It's My Party	Charlene Lee	
1997	Pink as the Day She Was Born	Donna	
1997	Face/Off	Wanda	
1997	Fakin' da Funk	May-Ling	
1997	Sweethearts	Noreen	
1998	Ground Control	Amanda	
1998	The Thin Pink Line	Asia Blue / Terry	
1998	The Rugrats Movie	Lt. Klavin	Voice
1999	Can't Stop Dancing	JoJo	
1999	The Tavern	Carol	
2000	$pent	Shirley	
2002	Grocery Store	Store Clerk	Short film
2003	Nobody Knows Anything!	Rental Car Agent	
2005	Bam Bam and Celeste	Celeste / Mommy	Writer
2006	Falling for Grace	Janie	
2007	Love Is Love	Girlfriend	Short film
2008	One Missed Call	Det. Mickey Lee	
2008	The Snake	The Expert	
2008	Prop 8: The Musical	California Gays and The People That Love Them	Short film
2009	17 Again	Mrs. Dell	
2011	Mindwash. The Jake Sessions	Dr. Francine Kovinsky	Voice, short film
2011	Thugs, the Musical!	Yvette	Short film
2012	The Immigrant	Margaret	Short film
2013	Amelia's 25th	Babs	
2013	Wedding Palace	The Shaman	
2013	Fish Power	Queen Tilapia	Short film
2014	Senior Project	Ms. Ghetty	
2015	Tooken	Brownfinger	
2016	Hurricane Bianca	Wig Shop Owner	
2017	Bright	Sergeant Ching	
2017	Sharknado 5: Global Swarming	Simone	
2020	Faith Based	Jane	
2020	Over the Moon	Auntie Ling / Gretch	Voice
2020	Friendsgiving	Fairy Gay Mother	
2021	Hysterical	Herself	Documentary
2021	Good on Paper	Margot	
2022	Sex Appeal	Ma Deb	
2022	Fire Island	Erin	
2022	The Listener	Corinne	Voice
2023	Cora Bora	Electra	
2023	Prom Pact	Ms. Chen	
2024	All That We Love	Emma	
2025	Queens of the Dead	Pops	
2026	I Want Your Sex	Detective Zola	
2026	Run Amok	Principal Linda	
2026	By the Roots	Janine Sorrel	
TBA	Better Life	TBA	Post-production
TBA	The Decline of Fucking Western Civilization	TBA	Filming

=== Television ===
Year	Title	Role	Notes/Ref.
1992	Move the Crowd		Television film
1992	The Golden Palace	Dr. Fong	Episode: "One Old Lady to Go"
1993	Red Shoe Diaries	Phone Sex Worker	Episode: "Hotline"
1994	The Critic		Voice, episode: "The Pilot"
1994	Attack of the 5 Ft. 2 Women	Connie Tong	Television film
1994–1995	All-American Girl	Margaret Kim	19 episodes
1995	Duckman	Mai Lin	Voice, episode: "In the Nam of the Father"
1995	Bill Nye the Science Guy	Self	Episode: "Populations"
1995–1997	Happily Ever After: Fairy Tales for Every Child	Queen, Hul Muh Ni	Voice, 2 episodes
1998	Five Houses		Television film
1998	The Nanny	Caryn	Episode: "Mom's the Word"
1999	Dr. Katz, Professional Therapist	Margaret	Voice, episode: "Wisdom Teeth"
2001	Sex and the City	Lynne	Episode: "The Real Me"
2002	One on One	Coach	Episode: "Me & My Shadow"
2003	The Anna Nicole Show	Herself	Episode: "Holiday Special"
2006	The Lost Room	Suzie Kang	2 episodes
2007	'Til Death	Nicole	3 episodes
2007–2009	Rick & Steve: The Happiest Gay Couple in All the World	Condie Ling / Various	Voice, 9 episodes
2008	Two Sisters		Television film
2008	Sordid Lives: The Series	Therapist No. 17	Episode: "The Day Tammy Wynette Died – Part 1"
2008	The Cho Show	Herself	Writer, Producer and Executive Producer
2008	Kathy Griffin: My Life on the D-List	Herself	Episode: "Fly the Super Gay Skies"
2009–2014	Drop Dead Diva	Teri Lee	Main role, 72 episodes
2010	Ghost Whisperer	Prof. Avery Grant	3 episodes
2010	The A-List: New York	Herself	Episode: "Texting and Tears"
2011–2012	30 Rock	Kim Jong Il	3 episodes Nominated – Primetime Emmy Award for Outstanding Guest Actress in a Comedy Series
2013	Where the Bears Are	Mistress Lena	Episode: "Bears in Chains"
2013	Pound Puppies	Mrs. Wattana	Episode: "Rebound's First Symphony"
2013–2017	Fashion Police	Co-host	21 episodes
2014	Cabot College	Laura	Television film
2014	Hell's Kitchen	Herself – Restaurant Patron	Season 13 Episode 16: "Winner Chosen"
2014	Sullivan & Son	Jenny	Episode: "Monkey Plate"
2015	Beat Bobby Flay	Herself	Season 6 Episode 12: "Rules Are Ment to Be Broken"
2015	Celebrity Wife Swap	Herself	Episode: "Margaret Cho/Holly Robinson Peete"
2015	All About Sex	Co-host	2 episodes
2015	Dr. Ken	Dr. Wendi	Episode: "Dr. Wendi: Coming To L.A.!"
2016	Family Guy	Sujin	Voice, episode: "Candy, Quahog Marshmallow"
2016	TripTank	Ling, Dump	Voice, episode: "Deuce Ex Machina"
2017	The Mr. Peabody & Sherman Show	Hua Mulan	Voice, episode: "Mulan"
2018	Home: Adventures with Tip & Oh	Georgia	Voice, episode: "Trashbassador"
2019	The Masked Singer	Poodle/Herself	
2019	High Maintenance	Doc Lee	Episode: "Pay Day"
2019	Law & Order: SVU	Evelyn Lee	Episode: "Counselor, it's Chinatown"
2019	Miracle Workers	God's Mom	Episode: "1 Day"
2020	The Bachelorette	Herself	Episode: "Week 3"
2020	Mike Tyson Mysteries	Michelle	Voice, episode: "Your Old Man"
2020	The Bold Type	Herself	Episode: "#Scarlet"
2021–2022	Tuca & Bertie	Bertie's mother	Voice, 2 episodes
2021	Infinity Train	Morgan	Voice, 3 episodes
2021	Pride	Herself	Episode: "2000s: Y2Gay"
2021	Good Trouble	Herself	3 episodes
2021	The Great North	Jan	Voice, episode: "Brace/Off Adventure"
2021	Doogie Kameāloha, M.D.	Frankie	Episode: "Career Babes"
2021	Awkwafina Is Nora from Queens	Mistress Jupiter	2 episodes
2022	Bubble Guppies	Lucy	Voice, episode: "The SS Friendship!"
2022	I Can See Your Voice	Herself	Episode: "Episode 8: Shaggy, Margaret Cho, Rachael Harris, Cheryl Hines, Adrienne Bailon-Houghton"
2022	The Flight Attendant	Charlie Utada	Recurring role (season 2)
2022	Hacks	Herself	Episode: "The Captain's Wife"
2022	The L Word: Generation Q	Herself	Episode: "Quiz Show"
2023	History of the World, Part II	Sophia	Episode: "VI"
2023	Not Dead Yet	Miss Cassandra	Episode: "Not Scattered Yet"
2023	Call Me Kat	Val Park	Episode: "Call Me, Pretty Kitty"
2023	Launchpad	Maxine	Episode: "Maxine"
2024	Life & Beth	Dr. Collins	2 episodes
2024	Zombies: The Re-Animated Series	Ashley	Voice, 2 episodes
2024	Kite Man: Hell Yeah!	Rebecca Chen	Voice, 4 episodes
2024	Doctor Odyssey	Judy Riva	Episode: "Wellness Week"
2025	Dying for Sex		2 episodes
2025	Will Trent	Dr. Roach	5 episodes
2025	The Bravest Knight	Cho	Voice, episode: "Cedric & the Genie"
2025	Percy Jackson and the Olympians	Wasp	Episode: "I Play Dodgeball with Cannibals"

=== Comedy specials ===
Year	Title	Studio	Formats
1994	HBO Comedy Half-Hour	HBO	Broadcast / Streaming (2015)
2000	Filmed Live in Concert – I'm the One That I Want	Fox Lorber CentreStage / Winstar / Matchbox Films	Broadcast / VHS/DVD (2001) / Download/Streaming (2013)
2002	Filmed Live in Concert – Notorious C.H.O.	Vagrant Films / Wellspring / Matchbox Films	Broadcast / VHS/DVD / Download/Streaming (2013)
2004	CHO Revolution	Cho Taussig Productions / Wellspring / Matchbox Films	VHS/DVD / Download/Streaming (2013)
2005	Margaret Cho: Assassin	Regent Releasing/Here! Films / Koch Vision / Matchbox Films	Theatrical / DVD / Download/Streaming (2013)
2009	Beautiful	Asian Crush / Showtime / Image Entertainment / Matchbox Films	Broadcast / DVD / Download/Streaming (2013)
2011	Cho Dependent	Clownery Productions / Showtime / Matchbox Films	Broadcast / DVD / Download/Streaming (2013)
2015	PsyCHO	Clownery Productions / Showtime / Comedy Dynamics	Broadcast / DVD / Download / Streaming

=== Web ===
Year	Title	Role	Notes
2007	Girltrash!	Min Suk	Episode 3
2013	Gayle	Yo-Yo Ma	Episode: "Chibby Point"
2013	In Transition	Tawny Kim	13 episodes

=== Podcasts ===
- Monsters of Talk (2013–2015): Co-hosted w/ Jim Short, 131 episodes
- The Margaret Cho (2019–2021)

The Margaret Cho episodes
Date	Guests
July 15, 2019	Jonathan Van Ness and Katie Malia
July 22, 2019	Kat Von D and Drew Droege
July 29, 2019	Michael Yo and Lucas Peterson
August 5, 2019	Robin Tran
August 12, 2019	Fortune Feimster and Jodi Long
August 19, 2019	Diablo Cody, Durk Dehner, and S. R. Sharp
August 26, 2019	Cherie Currie and Helen Hong
September 2, 2019	Daniel Webb
September 9, 2019	Jo Koy and Ian Harvie
September 16, 2019	Trixie Mattel
September 23, 2019	Amy Landecker
October 1, 2019	Jackie Beat and Mary H.K. Choi

== Bibliography ==
Year	Title	Publisher	Formats
2001	I'm the One That I Want	Random House	Hardcover / Paperback / Kindle / CD / Audible (Read by the Author)
2005	I Have Chosen to Stay and Fight	Penguin-HighBridge	Hardcover / Paperback / Kindle / CD / Download (Read by the Author)

== Discography ==
=== Comedy albums ===
Year	Title	Label	Formats
1996	Drunk with Power	Uproar Entertainment	Cassette / CD / Download
1998	Live in Houston	Soundball International	CD
2001	Live in Concert – I'm the One That I Want	Cho Taussig Productions / Nettwerk America	2xCD / Download
2002	Notorious C.H.O. – Live at Carnegie Hall	Nettwerk America	2xCD / Download
2003	Revolution	Nettwerk America	CD / Download
2005	Assassin	Nettwerk	CD / Download
2009	Live and Uncut – Beautiful	Image Entertainment	Download
2011	Cho Dependent – Live at the Tabernacle	Clownery Records	Download
2015	PsyCHO	Clownery Productions	Download

=== Music albums ===
Year	Title	Label	Formats
2010	Cho Dependent	Clownery Records	LP / CD / Download
2016	American Myth	Clownery Records	Download
2025	Lucky Gift	Clownery Records	LP / Download

=== EPs ===
Year	Title	Label	Formats
2021	Pair of Jokers: Margaret Cho & Bobby Collins	Clown Jewels	Download

=== Singles ===
Year	Title	Other Artists	Label	Formats
2002	"Daddy Gay Story"	Junior Vasquez Mix	Nettwerk America	12" Promo
2008	"I Cho Am a Woman"		Deston Entertainment	Download
2011	"Sexting"	Gomi & Sherry Vine	None	Download
2012	"I Drink" / "How Little Men Care"	Neil Hamburger	Million Dollar Performances	7" / Download
2014	"See U Next Tuesday"	Adam Barta	Margaret Cho	Download
2015	"Fat Pussy"		Clownery Records	Download
2015	"M**********n' Emojis!"	Princess Superstar	Princess Superstar	Download
2015	"Ron's Got a DUI"	Garrison Starr	Clownery Records	Download
2016	"Anna Nicole"	Garrison Starr	Clownery Records	Clear 7" Promo / Download
2017	"Asians in Hollywood" (Live at Largo)	7-Inches for Planned Parenthood	℗ 7-Inches For™, LLC	7" / Download
2024	"4Skin" (feat. Margaret Cho) (Cho Remix)	Gay Virgin	Gay Virgin Records	Download

=== Appearances ===
Year	Title	Tracks	Label	Formats
2001	Paul McCartney & Friends: The PeTA Concert for Party Animals	"Margaret Cho"	Image Entertainment	VHS / DVD
2006	Wed-Rock: A Benefit for Freedom to Marry	"Read the Administration" / "Origin of Love"	Centaur Entertainment	CD / Download
2010	Drop Dead Diva (Music from the Original Television Series)	"Would I Lie To You" / "Restraining Order"	Madison Gate Records	CD / Download
2010	New Music Seminar – New York City – 7/21/10 (5th Movement – The Breaks)	Moderator	New Music Seminar, LLC	Download
2013	An Evening With Neil Gaiman & Amanda Palmer	"Margaret Cho Introduces The Show"	8 ft. Records	LP / CD / Download
2013	See a Little Light: A Celebration of the Music and Legacy of Bob Mould	"Your Favorite Thing"	Granary Music	DVD / Download
2014	2776: A Levinson Bros & Rob Kutner Presentation	"Mt. Rushmore"	Levinson Bros & Rob Kutner	CD / Download
2015	Mitre: Mitre	"Bulletproof"	Mitre Records, Inc.	Download
2016	Ginger Minj: Sweet T	"Ride or Die"	Producer Entertainment Group	CD / Download
2018	Just for Laughs – Premium, Vol. 26	"Fresh Off the Boat" (Jfl 2015)	Just for Laughs	CD / Download

== Videography ==
=== Music videos as main artist ===
Year	Title	Other artists	Director	Album
2006	"My Puss"	Diana Yanez, Kurt Hall, Maureen & Angela	Margaret Cho	Cho Dependent
2009	"Eat Shit and Die" (Live at Largo)	Grant-Lee Phillips & Alexander Burke		Cho Dependent
2009	"25 Random Things" (Live at Largo)	Alexander Burke		Non-album track
2010	"My Lil' Wayne"	Ben Lee, Nic Johns; camera Ione Skye	Al Ridenour	Non-album track
2010	"I'm Sorry"	Andrew Bird	Liam Sullivan	Cho Dependent
2010	"Eat Shit and Die"	Grant-Lee Phillips	Liam Sullivan	Cho Dependent
2010	"Lice"	Ben Lee	Liam Sullivan	Cho Dependent
2010	"Intervention"	Tegan and Sara	Liam Sullivan	Cho Dependent
2011	"Captain Cameltoe"	Ani DiFranco	Roberutsu	Cho Dependent
2011	"Hey Big Dog"	Fiona Apple; co-writer Patty Griffin	Al Ridenour	Cho Dependent
2011	"Asian Adjacent"	Grant-Lee Phillips	Tani Ikeda	Cho Dependent
2011	"Baby I'm with the Band"	Brendan Benson	Liam Sullivan	Cho Dependent
2013	"Doesn't It Remind You of Something"	Ken Stringfellow (Feat. Margaret Cho)	Casey Curry	Danzig In the Moonlight
2015	"How Close Is Glenn Close"	John Roberts	Ned Stressen Rueter & Katherine Kendall	Non-album track
2015	"Fat Pussy"		John Asher	"American Myth"
2015	"Ron's Got a DUI"	Garrison Starr; starring Leslie Jordan	Bryan Mir	"American Myth"
2015	"I Wanna Kill My Rapist"	Andy Moraga & Roger Rocha	Bryan Mir & Ben Eisner	"American Myth"
2015	"M**********n' Emojis!"	Princess Superstar	Francis Legge	Non-album track
2015	"DICKtator"	Princess Superstar	Andy Moraga	Non-album track
2016	"Anna Nicole"	Garrison Starr	Bryan Mir	American Myth
2016	"Come With Me"	Garrison Starr	Bryan Mir	American Myth
2016	"Anna Nicole" (Live Acoustic)	Garrison Starr		American Myth
2016	"Green Tea"	Awkwafina	Tony Kim	In Fina We Trust EP

=== Directed by ===
Year	Title	Artist	Featuring
2006	"Former Miss Ontario"	The Music Lovers	Princess Farhana, Bobby Pinz, Kelly, Vima & Margaret Cho
2007	"Masculin Feminin"	The Music Lovers	Diana Yanez & Ian Harvie
2007	"Dancing Pom-Chi"	Latin Jazz	Gudrun, directed with Al Ridenour
2007	"Understood"	Garrison Starr	Kurt Hall, Diana Yanez, Pleasant Gehman, Liam Sullivan & Bruce Daniels; shot with Scott Silverman & Ian Harvie
2007	"Eyes in the Back of My Head"	The Cliks	Margaret Cho, Diana Yanez & Amanda Palmer
2009	"San Francisco"	Jill Sobule	Lorene Machado, Mookey Goh, Violet Blue, Monistat, Peter Acworth, Lorelei Lee, Mark Eitzel, Cecilia Chung & Tita Aida
2010	"Young James Dean"	Girlyman	Original Plumbing- Amos Mac & Rocco Kayiatos, Ian Harvie, Madison Young, Donna Delore & Tomcat
2010	"The Bear Song"	Pixie Herculon	Danny Blume & Gary Meister
