= Rick Copp =

American novelist

- Born: August 20, 1964 (age 62); Bar Harbor, Maine, U.S.
- Occupations: Television writer; film actor; story editor
- Years active: 1988–present
- Website: https://www.rickcopp.com

Rick Copp (born August 20, 1964) is an American television writer, story editor, producer and occasional actor. He was an executive story editor for 11 episodes and writer for two episodes of the short-lived 1991 NBC sitcom Flesh 'n' Blood. He also wrote for Flying Blind, The Golden Girls and Wings, among others. He was a co-writer on The Brady Bunch Movie and has written for many animated series including Teen Titans and Scooby-Doo. In 2005, he served as a consulting producer on the short-lived Barbershop television series, based on the Tim Story film of the same name.

He is also an author of four mystery novels, The Actor's Guide to Murder, The Actor's Guide to Adultery, The Actor's Guide to Greed and Fingerprints and Facelifts. His book The Actor's Guide to Greed was a Lambda Literary Award nominee in the Gay Mystery category at the 2006 Lambda Literary Awards. In 2012, he was one of the writers, creators and stars of the comedy mystery web series Where the Bears Are.

== Filmography ==
Film / Television
Year	Title	Role	Notes
1995	The Adventures of Captain Zoom in Outer Space	Happy, Zoom's TV Sidekick	(TV Movie)
1996	ABC Afterschool Specials (TV Series)	Pharmacist	(TV Series), 1 episode: "Teenage Confidential"
1997–1998	Team Knight Rider	Clayton, the SkyOne Chef	(TV Series), 7 episodes
1999	Dead Dogs	Jimmy the store clerk	(Film)
2011–2012	Femme Fatales	Professor Richard Hollis	(TV Series), 4 episodes: "Visions: Part 1", "Visions: Part 2", "Extracurricular Activities" and "Jail Break"
2012–2019	Where the Bears Are	Reggie Hatch / Reggie	(Web Series), 134 episodes
