= Jibz Cameron =

American performance and visual artist

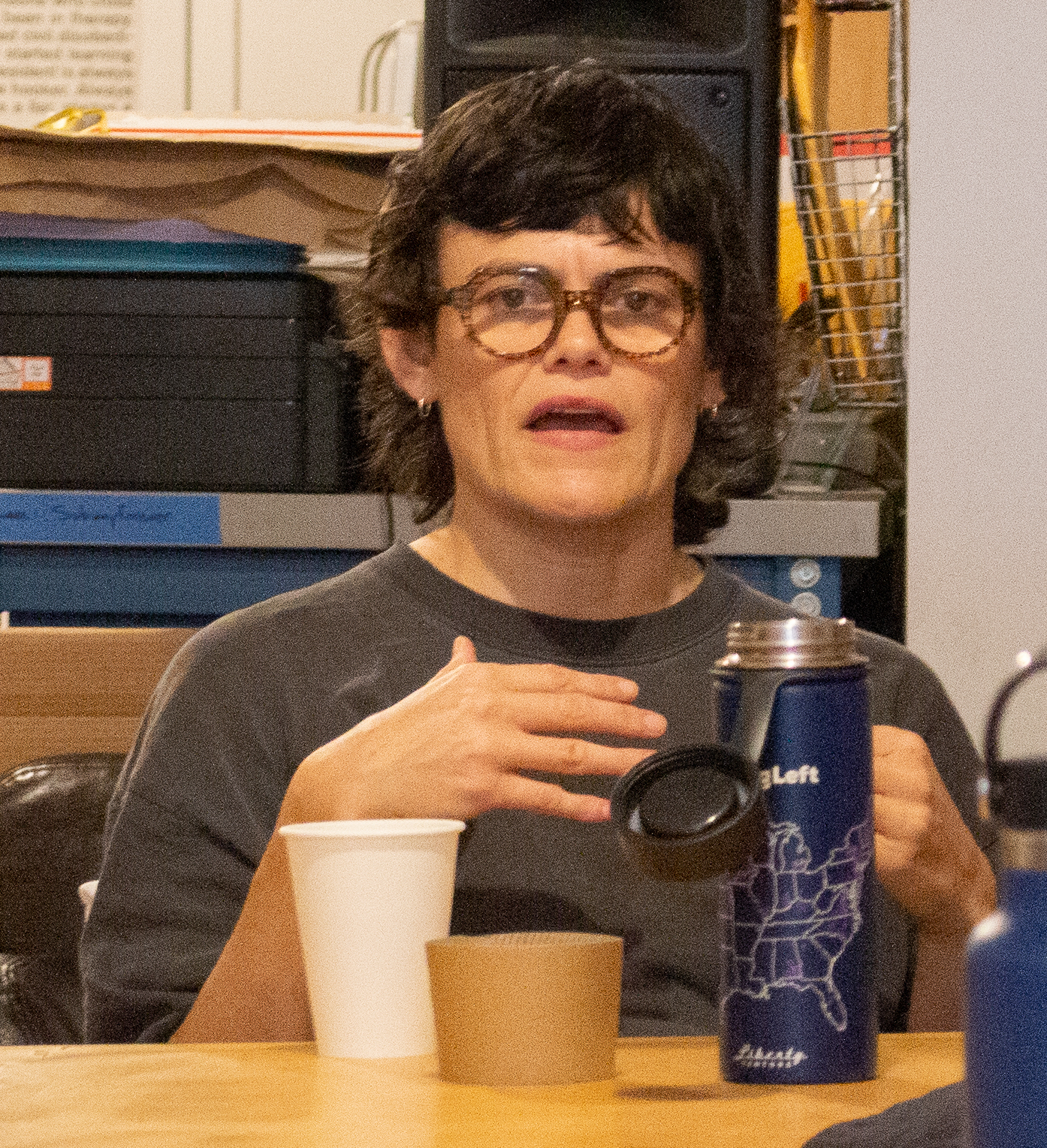
- Born: Jibralia Cameron; 1975 (age 50–51); Annapolis, California
- Education: San Francisco Art Institute
- Known for: Performance art; visual art; video art
- Notable work: Dynasty Handbag
- Awards: 2022 Guggenheim Fellowship in Drama & Performance Art
- Website: dynastyhandbag.com

Jibz Cameron (born 1975) is an American queer performance artist, visual artist, recording artist, and video artist most known for her work produced under the persona Dynasty Handbag, an alter ego created in 2001. Her performance art has been called "outrageously smart, grotesque and innovative" by The New Yorker and referred to as "[...] one of the most insanely funny, tone-perfect pieces of performance art I have seen in years" by Jennifer Dunning in The New York Times.

== Early life and education ==
Jibralia "Jibz" Cameron was born in 1975 in Annapolis in northern California. As a child she attended Wavy Gravy's Summer Camp, Camp Winnarainbow, a performing arts camp which leaned more towards an activist message.

Despite not graduating high school, Cameron applied to the San Francisco Art Institute after some friends encouraged her, and was accepted after she submitted some Edward Gorey-style comics she drew. The art institute introduced Cameron to performance art and other opportunities. Cameron later did an internship with The Wooster Group. She has taught at universities as a visiting professor at California Institute of the Arts and an adjunct professor at Tisch School of the Arts at NYU.

== Career ==
=== Dynasty Handbag ===
The alter ego Cameron created to perform on stage, Dynasty Handbag, started as a music project. After graduating from the Art Institute, Cameron started writing songs on her keyboard which were going to be used in a band she intended to form with two other girls, called Dynasty. However, when those plans fell through, she created "Dynasty Handbag", and Dynasty Handbag debuted at Ladyfest in San Francisco in 2002. Cameron gave a summary about the persona in an Artsy interview:

[Dynasty Handbag] was a music-based project, but it was very performative and had a lot of interruptions of disembodied voices and disassociated, fragmented thoughts, and other things going on while I was on stage. It was about this larger concept of a failed woman—a sad, divorced funeral-goer from Miami or something. She was highly dressed-up, and a failure at womanhood.

Dynasty Handbag tends to wear thick and messy makeup with outlandish outfits on stage, such as a black spandex swimsuit or a vintage long-sleeved shirt and transparent tights tucked into oversized, gold granny panties. The persona expresses the inner voice and emotions one might have in social situations by being blunt and critical. She openly discusses negative emotions but does so in a humorous way through exaggeration and expressive facial expressions. Instead of silencing those thoughts to fit into society, Dynasty Handbag lacks social boundaries or proper etiquette by saying and doing whatever she wants.

Handbag's one-woman act additionally has a political aspect as she openly brings up gender and queer issues. As Cultural theorist José Esteban Muñoz once wrote, "Dynasty Handbag's queer failure is not an aesthetic failure but, instead, a political refusal. It is going off script, and the script in this instance is the mandate that makes queer and other minoritarian cultural performers work not for themselves but for distorted cultural hierarchy."

In 2023, Handbag did a performance, "Titanic Depression," that has been commissioned by Pioneer Works curator Everitt Howe. The performance was considered Handbag's most multidisciplinary project at the time, as it involved animation, video, soundscapes, singing, history and dance. Cameron had mentioned the idea for live performance in 2020 as a collaboration with the artist, Sue Slagle/Sue-C and had been presented as part of the New York Live Arts festival Planet Justice.

=== Songwriting ===
Cameron writes songs but performs them as Dynasty Handbag. The songs tend to be parodies of other songs such as her "I Can't Stop Thinking 'Bout Having Sex With You Girl," parodying the New Country song "Cruise" by Florida Georgia Line. Her songs additionally relate to other existing works in media. Cameron's "Hell in a Handbag" was based on Dante's Inferno.

=== Weirdo Night ===
Weirdo Night was described by Taylor Doran from Artillery to be:

The variety show brought together disparate performers and comedians, all of them—you guessed it—Weirdos. Dynasty Handbag, resplendent in neon spandex and smeared lipstick, is the steady but irreverent leader of the weirdos

Jibz Cameron currently resides in Los Angeles and hosts/produces Weirdo Night at Zebulon Cafe Concert in Elysian Valley. A 4-camera recorded version of Weirdo Night was selected for the 2021 Sundance Film Festival.

Past guest stars of Weirdo Night include: Ayo Edebiri, Joseph Keckler, Jack Black, Tanya Haden, Kate Berlant, Puddles Pity Party, John Early, Mitra Jouhari, Xina Xurner, Sarah Squirm, River Ramirez, Francesca D'Uva, Anna Homler, emotional store, Christina Catherine Martinez, Marley Eat My Ass Gotterer, Kristina Wong, Jerry Jergens, Marawa The Amazing, Naz Riahi, Wild Yawp, Rudy Blue Martinez, Nao Bustamante, Carrie Brownstein, Tashi Condolee, Hardcore Tina, Seth Bogart, Charles Galin, John C. Reilly, Kathleen Hanna, Trap Girl, San-Cha, Maria Bamford, Cole Escola, eddy kwon, Jack Ferver, Holland Andrews, Illustrious Pearl, Svetlana Kitto, Meriem Bennani, Raphael Khouri, Candy Pain, Miss Barbie-Q, Lizzy Cooperman, Atsuko Okatsuka, Penis, Karen Tongson, Peter Kim, Sandy Smiles, CHRISTEENE, MINIVAN, and La Pregunta.

=== Exhibitions ===
Her performances and video works have been presented at prestigious venues and festivals including the Andy Warhol Museum in Pittsburgh, the Hammer Museum in Los Angeles, The Kitchen in New York, REDCAT in Los Angeles, Brooklyn Academy of Music, The New Museum in New York, Los Angeles County Museum of Art, Joe's Pub in New York, Performa in New York, the Portland Institute for Contemporary Art, Centre Pompidou in Paris, the Museum of Contemporary Art San Diego, SXSW in Austin, and others.

=== Visual art ===
Cameron is a visual artist who creates drawings and other visual works. Her visual art has been exhibited at galleries including Maccarone in Los Angeles.

== Artistic influences ==
Music is a big creative element in Cameron's works, which might have stemmed from childhood love of the radio. Cameron additionally ties a lot of inspiration for her performance art from her childhood trauma. In an interview with Ed Patuto of The Broad, regarding her video, I Hate This Place, she links her style with the need to make light of past trauma as a sort of coping mechanism:

I subscribe to the comedy is tragedy plus time adage. When I'm able to process things and communicate them after the fact, they come out funny.

In the same interview, Cameron says how her performance video is inspired by Mike Kelley's "Extracurricular Activity Projective Reconstructions #10, 21, 24 (Gym Interior)" in how they both deal with comedy and childhood drama. She goes into depth about her junior high bully and her critiques about the institutional system and social structure, especially how it affects young females by sexualizing them before they're mentally mature enough.

In another interview, she named the performers Carmelita Tropicana, Anne Lobst and Lucy Sexton from DANCENOISE, Martha Wilson, and Franklin Furnace among the individuals who helped further develop her style.

== Television ==
In 2019, she had the potential FX TV series, Garbage Castle, in the works, which starred her persona, Dynasty Handbag, in a setting where they lived in a single-room apartment on top of a pile of trash. However, the project was put on hold due to the COVID-19 pandemic.

== Personal life ==
Cameron first became known as a performance artist in San Francisco, and then in New York, before settling down in LA. And while she currently resides in LA, her experiences living in San Francisco and New York have helped shape her artistic identity.

Cameron moved to New York in 2004 and primarily hung out in queer communities, which further influenced her style. In an interview, Svetlana Kitto labeled Cameron as part of a new iteration of queer punk performance art, scene descended from the Pyramid Club. Being a queer artist, Cameron has spoken about performing after significant violence events against LGBTQ+ community:

There have been times when I've had to perform right after a major event, like the Pulse nightclub shooting or the 2016 election. And since they had already happened, we could process and let some rage out. Right now it's just dead fear...It just feels like this vast unknown, and that's a little bit how I feel about myself right now, to be honest.

As of May 2023, Cameron is in a relationship with visual director Mariah Garnett, with whom she worked on "Titanic Depression." Her co-writer is Amanda Verwey.

== Notable works ==
=== Video ===
- Garbage Castle, 2019 Directed by Casey Rupp, Written by Jibz Cameron + Amanda Verwey, Produced by Starburns Industries
- I Hate This Place, 2020 4:33 commissioned by the BROAD Museum
- Vat Do You Van For Bwekfas, 2016, 2:30 directed by Mariah Garnett, produced by Starburns Ind. for Jash
- The Quiet Storm, 2007, 09:00 min, directed by Hedia Maron, Written by Jibz Cameron
- FASCIST DICTATORSHIP MAKEUP TUTORIAL, 2016, 6:20 min
- Don't Sit/Lie, 2015, 2:05, Erase Errata video directed by Hannah Lew

=== Performance ===
- Weirdo Night, November 7, 2021, Zebulon LA
- Weirdo Night, December 5, 2021
- Weirdo Night – April 21, 2022, The Bell House
- Weirdo Night, June 5, 2022 at Zebulon
- Weirdo Night, October 2, 2022, Zebulon
- Weirdo Night, Dec 4, 2022 – Zebulon
- Weirdo Night at the Bell House, Feb 2nd, 2023

== Awards and honors ==
Cameron received the 2022 Guggenheim Fellowship in Drama & Performance Art.
