= Sam Pancake =

American actor (b. 1964)

- Born: May 10, 1964 (age 62); Hollidaysburg, Pennsylvania, U.S.
- Education: West Virginia University (BFA)
- Occupations: Actor; improviser; writer; comedian
- Years active: 1990–present
- Relatives: Ann Pancake (sister); Chet Pancake (brother)

Sam Pancake (born May 10, 1964) is an American actor, improviser, writer, and comedian. He began his career with small roles in TV and film, such as Wings in 1990 and Pizza Man in 1991.

== Early life ==
Sam Pancake was raised in Romney, West Virginia, with siblings Chet Pancake, an American filmmaker, and Ann Pancake, an American novelist. Sam is also a distant relative of Breece D'J Pancake. Sam's father, Joe S. Pancake, was a Presbyterian minister, and later in life, a social worker. His mother, Robin Pancake, was a high-school teacher. Both parents attended university, and encouraged their children to pursue the arts, which Sam's sister Ann Pancake credits to the siblings' creativity.

== Education ==
Pancake graduated from Hampshire High School in West Virginia and graduated cum laude with a bachelor of fine arts in theater from West Virginia University in 1990. After graduation, Pancake moved to Los Angeles, where he still resides.

== Career ==
Sam Pancake was 26 when he made his first on-screen appearance in the TV show Wings in 1990. Pancake has appeared as Alfie Copper in Where the Bears Are and James Alan Spangler in Arrested Development (between 2003 and 2004). He hosts his own show, Monday Afternoon Movie, a weekly podcast focusing on a different 1970's TV movie each week.

== Filmography ==
Year	Title	Role
1990	Wings	Deliveryman
1991	Pizza Man	The Kid
1991	True Colors	Howard
1995	Cagney & Lacey: Together Again	Roy Osmond
1995	Fast Company	Mr. Ashton
1996	Scream, Teen, Scream	Henry
1997	Interruptions	Brian
1997	Blue Heat: The Case of the Cover Girl Murders	Vernon Breen
1998	The Thin Pink Line	Randy Nephews
1998	God	Margaret's Husband
1998	Gia	Francesco Stylist
1998	The Hughleys	The Salesman
1999	Can't Stop Dancing	Commercial Casting Agent
1999	G vs E	Oliver
1999	Angel	Manager
2000	Color Me Gay	Lisping Office Homo
2000	Kiss Tomorrow Goodbye	Mackey's Secretary
2000	Cover Me	Jerome
2000	Any Day Now	Hollis
2001	Spyder Games	Motel Clerk
2001	Curb Your Enthusiasm	Michael Halbreich
2002	The King of Queens	Desk Clerk
2002	Yes, Dear	Waiter
2002	Friends	The Waiter
2003	Legally Blonde 2: Red, White & Blonde	Kevin
2003	Girls Will Be Girls	Brad
2003	The West Wing	Stu Winkle
2003	Charmed	Skreek
2003	Friends	The Waiter
2004	Win a Date with Tad Hamilton!	Hotel Clerk
2004	Straight-Jacket	Tour Guide
2004	Good Morning, Miami	Jordy
2004	NYPD Blue	James Westphal
2004	Will & Grace	Jimmy
2004	Arrested Development	James Alan Spangler
2004	Life with Bonnie	Constance / Chance / Juggler
2005	The Life Coach	Tracy Neustadt
2005	A Lot like Love	Hipster at Party
2005	All of Us	Paul the Wedding Planner
2005	Fat Actress	Man in Car
2005	Kitchen Confidential	Cameron
2006	A-List	Bruce
2006	Without a Trace	Michael Mills
2006	American Dad!	Waiter
2006	Lovespring International	Burke Kristopher
2007	Cook Off!	David Lord
2008	Ready? OK!	Mable
2008	Over Her Dead Body	Bill
2008	Just Ask Mike	Jay
2008	Untitled Victoria Pile Project	Medical Examiner
2008	Chocolate News	Father Wayne Stephens
2009	Falling Up	Ray
2009	Pushing Daisies	Denny Downs
2010	Barry Munday	D.J.
2010	Gaysharktank.com	
2010	'Til Death	Stewart
2010	$#*! My Dad Says	Lawrence
2010-12	Pretty the Series	Michael Champagne
2011	Qwerty	Chase
2011	Half-Share	Michael No
2011	Holiday Engagement	Julian
2011	Svetlana	Jared
2012	Beverly Hills Chihuahua 3: Viva la Fiesta!	Frederick
2012	Living Will	Nurse Sam
2012	Something Real	
2012	The Penis Files	Sam Smithhoff Hopeful
2012	Waffle Hut	Del Handle
2012	Parenthood	Adam's Makeup Artist
2012	She's Living for This	
2013	Out West	Travis Lennon
2013	Paragon School for Girls	Mrs. Copperpenny
2013	Jessie	Simon Sneed
2014	Space Station 76	Saul
2014	The Hungover Games	Tracey
2014	Growing Up Fisher	Kevin
2014	From Here on OUT	Richard
2014	Hit the Floor	Wendall
2014	Los Feliz, 90027	Sal Malone
2014	Where the Bears Are	Alfie Cooper
2015	You're Killing Me	Dr. Strauss
2015	Cougar Town	Mr. Danner
2015	Truth Be Told	Stephen
2015	Not Looking	Homeless Nathan
2016	The Family Lamp	Sam
2016	Transparent	Drag Blair
2016	Bajillion Dollar Propertie$	Pyotr
2016	Documentary Now!	Ed Brulay
2016	Major Crimes	George Greenwood
2016	Gilmore Girls: A Year in the Life	Donald
2016	Last Will and Testicle	Doctor
2016	Neil Patrick and Harris	Clarke
2017	Linda from HR	Oren Ferver
2017	Losing It	Kevin
2017	The Mick	Oliver Fishburn
2017	His Wives and Daughters	Nathan Markham
2017	Pilot Season	Sam
2018	Dumplin'	Dale
2018	The Untitled Lucy Davis & Kimberly Aboltin Project	Frank
2018–2023	A Million Little Things	Carter French
2019	Abby's	Richard
2020	Equal	Dick Leitsch
2020–2021	Search Party	Patrick

== Personal life ==
Pancake is gay and notes that he most often portrays gay characters in films and television series. Pancake is single and has no children.
