= Ann Pancake =

American novelist

Ann Pancake is an American fiction writer and essayist. She has published a novel, short stories and essays describing the people and atmosphere of Appalachia, often from the first-person perspective of those living there. While fictional, her short stories contribute to an understanding of poverty in the 20th century, and well as the historical roots of American and rural poverty. Much of Pancake's writing also focuses on the destruction caused by natural resource extraction, particularly in Appalachia, and the lives of the people affected.

Pancake believes that people from the Appalachian region of the United States have many qualities that other Americans lack, such as the art of storytelling.

== Life ==
Though her West-Virginian heritage spans seven generations back, Pancake was born in Richmond, Virginia, where her father was enrolled in seminary at the time. She grew up in Summersville, West Virginia in Nicholas County, later moving to Romney, West Virginia when she was eight years old. She is the sister of filmmaker Chet Pancake and actor Sam Pancake, and a distant relative of the writer Breece D'J Pancake. Her father was a Presbyterian minister, and later in life, a social worker. Her mother was an art teacher, teaching at a high school. At a young age, Pancake heard her father preach a sermon against strip-mining to his middle-class congregation. Due to the bold nature of the sermon, it was picked up and broadcast on the radio. Pancake had never realized that she and her family had accents until she heard her father's voice on the radio. She would later remark that the worst part about living outside of Appalachia is not being able to hear Appalachian people speak.

Growing up, she was always taught that land was a thing to be cherished, and that family land was not to be sold or developed. She spent much of her childhood playing in the creek and woods on her family's property; as a woman she was not permitted to hunt. From a very early age Pancake was curious about social justice. Her parents were readers and college educated, which was uncommon in their community at the time. Pancake also had access to books growing up, and was encouraged to read by her parents.

Pancake has also expressed that, when she was growing up, she wanted to move away from West Virginia. She had a complicated relationship with West Virginia throughout her life - battling her homesickness and attachment to West Virginia but also her desire to explore places outside of the state. She still has this conflicted relationship with the state today.

When she was eighteen, Ann Pancake moved from Romney and attended West Virginia University, graduating summa cum laude with a degree in English. Pancake found West Virginia University to be a "culture shock" as there were a large number of out-of-state students at the time. Due to low employment rates in West Virginia, after graduating, Pancake left the state and started to teach in various countries in Asia and the South Pacific. She taught in Japan for a year, American Samoa for two years, and Thailand for almost a year. Pancake never expected to be a writer, so she pursued a Ph.D. rather than an MFA, which at the time she thought herself not talented enough to complete. She earned her M.A. in English from the University of North Carolina, writing her master's thesis on Samoan writer Albert Wendt, using postcolonial theory. She later earned her Ph.D. in English from the University of Washington, where her driving dissertation question was "how Americans sustain their delusion that we have essentially a classless society given the glaring economic disparity in this country. Pancake says that her literature degree helped her to shape her own writing. When she was writing her dissertation, she would always write fiction whenever and anywhere she could, especially during any breaks she got.

Her time outside of the East Coast and the United States formed her understanding of Appalachia, and helped her see the value in the region she came from. During her time abroad, Pancake found herself so homesick that she kept writing about Appalachia despite being on a completely different continent.

She currently lives in a small town near Morgantown, WV, and teaches Appalachian fiction and environmental criticism. She recently resigned from WVU in protest of the politically oriented gutting of essential courses, staff, and professors there in 2023.

== Context, themes, and style ==
Many of Pancake's characters make their home in rural West Virginia. This includes the Potomac Highlands and areas in the southern part of the state. For example, her story Wappatomaka describes the Trough region of the Highlands, where severe flooding on the Potomac River often occurs.

Poverty can be reflected in violence, and in her stories Pancake addresses both the Vietnam War and domestic abuse. Dirt chronicles a family's reflection of a son taught to burrow shafts in the Vietnam War, and the entrapment and dread that this environment echoes for them at home. In Jolo, a boy's neglect by his family is literally seared into his skin in a trailer fire.

Pancake's characters live in opposition to mainstream American society, often without conscious choice. Others revel in their outsider status and maintain a connection to nature that resists societal pressures. Her title character in the story Jolo is wanted by police investigating a series of arsons. While the boy is a fugitive he agrees to secretly meet with a local girl, Connie, in a remote location on the banks of a river. The river serves as a reminder of Jolo's untamed nature and his preference for the wilderness over village life. At the same time, Connie sees how cut off he is from the rural society both of them were born into. This is a virtue of physical deformities he has suffered, but also because of the comparative economic poverty of his upbringing.

While some critics have chosen to place Pancake firmly in the tradition of Appalachian writing, her stories describe more than regional color, history, and concerns. The subtext of much of her work is the separation of individuals from the rest of society, often in cycles of poverty. Early motherhood, hunger, and alienation from mainstream economies are manifest in stories such as Ghostless and Tall Grass. The sharply divided interests of urban and rural Americans and the powerful determinant of social class is manifest in Bait and "Redneck Boys" where the death toll of rural highways is both the cause of nonchalance and horror. Her work also appears in the collection LGBTQ Fiction and Poetry from Appalachia, edited by Jeff Mann and Julia Watts.

Pancake's work often stresses voice, contrasting perspectives and colloquial speech with unusual sentence structure and unusual use of dialogue and dialogue markers. She also has a specialized vocabulary for describing natural phenomena and colors.

They're moving. The night fishermen across the water, mumbly drunk, to be avoided, and the single night train, baying its lonesomeness, and the corn pollen a green sensation in the back of their throats, not quite smell, not quite taste.

Rather than plot, Pancake's writing is more focused on language, and how the presentation of words affects the reader of a text.

== Short stories ==
Pancake's stories include several published in her short story collection Given Ground, including the following with original publication information in parentheses:

- Ghostless (The Virginia Quarterly Review)
- Revival (The Virginia Quarterly Review)
- Jolo (Mid-American Review)
- Wappatomaka (Antietam Review)
- Dirt (The Chariton Review)
- Tall Grass (Shenandoah)
- Sister (Wind)
- Bait (Sundog)
- Getting Wood (Antietam Review)
- Redneck Boys (Glimmer Train Stories)
- Crow Season (The Chattahoochee Review)
- Cash Crop: 1897 (Massachusetts Review)
- Tough (Walk till the Dogs Get Mean)

Additional stories include:

- Dog Song (Shenandoah)
- Coop (Quarterly West)
- In Such Light (Harvard Review)

== Novel: Strange As This Weather Has Been ==
Ann Pancake's first novel Strange As This Weather Has Been was published by Shoemaker & Hoard/Counterpoint in October 2007. Set in southern West Virginia, the novel has been widely reviewed, and was termed by Wendell Berry "one of the bravest novels I've ever read."

Pancake began writing the novel at a time when mountaintop removal mining was seldom known. She chose to write a piece of fiction, rather than journalistic nonfiction, believing a fiction story would function more effectively in conveying the spiritual relationship that humans have with the earth. Each child in the novel embodies a different part of Pancake's experiences as a child in Appalachia. The novel took Pancake seven years to complete. She remarks that the novel was actually quite a difficult endeavor, since she had previously only ever written short stories. This is why Strange As This Weather Has Been is composed of a number of different characters who narrate their own chapters - each character has their own story, rather than the entire novel wrapping up into one large plotline. Pancake gave a reading of this novel at the Washington State Art Museum where she was a part of the Meet The Artist Fellowship.

Strange as This Weather Has Been won the 2007 Weatherford Prize. It was also on the Kirkus Reviews Top Ten Fiction Books list, a finalist for the 2008 Washington State Book Award for fiction, and a finalist for the 2008 Orion Book award.

== Film: Black Diamonds ==
Ann provided some initial research and interview assistance for the film Black Diamonds: Mountaintop Removal and the Fight for Coalfield Justice (2006). The film was directed by her brother, Chet Pancake. Throughout the filming process, Pancake found herself writing short stories based loosely on the children they encountered. These stories would later become the first draft of Strange As This Weather Has Been. At this time, mountaintop removal was not widely known.

For a discussion of the themes, geography, and production of this film, see Bret McCabe's article Tragic Mountains from the Baltimore City Paper.

== Selected works ==
=== Short story collections ===
- Given Ground, University Press of New England, 2001
- Me and My Daddy Listen to Bob Marley: Novellas and Stories, Counterpoint Press, 2016

=== Novel ===
- Strange As This Weather Has Been, Counterpoint Press, 2007

== Selected awards and fellowships ==
- 2018 Honorary Doctorate of Letters from West Virginia University
- 2017 Distinguished Writer-in-Residence at the University of Hawaii, Manoa
- 2016 Barry Lopez Visiting Writer in Ethics and the Community Fellowship
- 2011 Keynote Speaker at the Carolina Mountains Literary Festival
- 2010 Thomas D. and Lily Chaffin Award for Appalachian Literature
- 2010 Brenda Ueland Fiction Prize for "Me and My Daddy Listen to Bob Marley"
- 2008 Finalist for Orion Book Award
- 2007 Weatherford Prize for best fiction/poetry about Appalachia, for Strange As This Weather Has Been
- 2007 Kirkus Reviews Top Ten Fiction Books of 2007 for Strange as This Weather Has Been
- 2006 Plattner Award for Nonfiction for "Virtual Hillbilly"
- 2005 Doris Roberts/William Goyen Fellowship in Fiction, the Christopher Isherwood Foundation
- 2005 Artist Trust/Washington State Arts Commission Fellowship
- 2005 Julia Peterkin Prize
- 2004 Pushcart Prize for "Dog Song"
- 2004 West Virginia Commission on the Arts Fellowship
- 2003 Whiting Award
- 2003 Glasgow Prize for Given Ground, from Washington and Lee University
- 2000 Bakeless Literary Publication Prize for Given Ground
- 1996 National Endowment for the Arts Creative Writers' Fellowship Grant
