= Lurie Poston =

American actor and singer (born 1996)

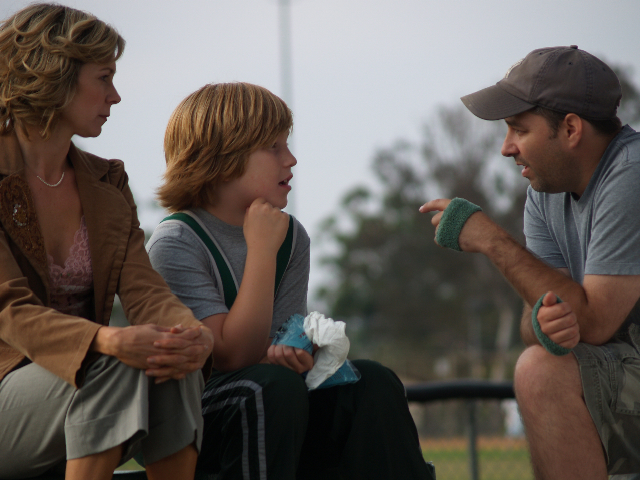
- Lurie Poston (center) with Carrie Preston and director James Vasquez on the set of the film Ready? OK!
- Born: Lurie Poston; Charleston, South Carolina
- Occupations: Actor, singer

Lurie Poston is an American actor and singer.

Poston began his career in the cast of the Broadway Musical Chitty Chitty Bang Bang, acting in over 300 performances. In 2003, he had a small part playing Young Varla in the film Girls Will Be Girls. He also appeared in Walk Hard: The Dewey Cox Story (2007), played Tommy Huff in Step Brothers (2008), and Knucklehead (2010); and had a starring role as Joshua Dowd in James Vasquez's 2008 award-winning feature film Ready? OK!, with Carrie Preston and Michael Emerson.

In November 2011, Poston guest-starred in the season finale of the television show Workaholics, playing Damien Carmichael. He also played Trevor in the 2014 Kickin' It episode "Martinez & Malone: Mall Cops!".

Poston attended the University of Southern California.

== Filmography ==
Year	Title	Role	Notes
2003	Girls Will Be Girls	Young Varla	
2007	Walk Hard: The Dewey Cox Story	Kid Cox	
2008	Ready? OK!	Joshua Dowd	
2008	Step Brothers	Tommy	
2010	Knucklehead	Todd	
2011	Workaholics	Damien Carmichael	Episode: 6 Hours Till Hedonism II
2014	Kickin' It	Trevor	Episode: Martinez & Malone: Mall Cops!
2025	High Potential	Bryan Schlotzky	Episode: "Chutes and Muders"
