= Feet of Clay =

Feet of Clay may refer to:

- Feet of clay, an idiom that refers to a weakness or character flaw, especially in people of prominence and power

== Film and television ==
- Feet of Clay (1924 film), an American lost silent film directed by Cecil B. DeMille
- Feet of Clay (1960 film), a British crime film directed by Frank Marshall
- Feet of Clay (2007 film), an American short film directed by Carrie Preston
- "Feet of Clay" (Doctors), a 2002 television episode

== Literature ==
- Feet of Clay (novel), a 1996 Discworld novel by Terry Pratchett
- "Feet of Clay" (Wodehouse story), a 1950 short story by P. G. Wodehouse
- "Feet of Clay", an 1893 short story by Kate McPhelim Cleary
- Feet of Clay; Saints, Sinners, and Madmen: A Study of Gurus, a 1996 book by Anthony Storr

== Music ==
- Feet of Clay (EP), by Earl Sweatshirt, 2019

== See also ==
- Feat of Clay (disambiguation)
