= James Vasquez =

American actor

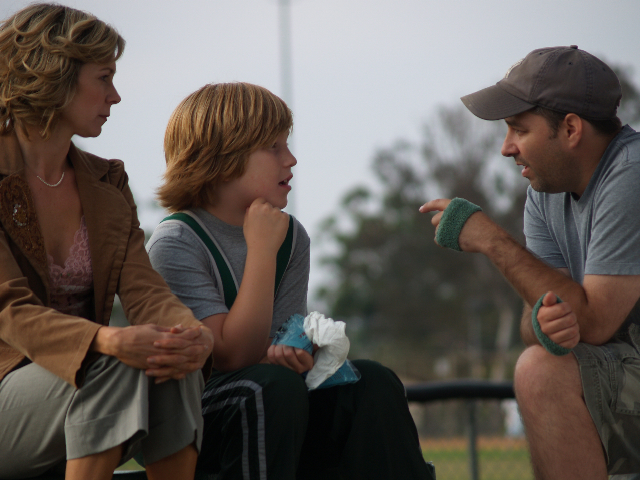
- Vasquez (right) directing Carrie Preston and Lurie Poston on the set of the film Ready? OK!
- Born: c. 1972 (age 52–53)
- Other names: Pedro James Vasquez
- Education: Juilliard School (BFA)
- Occupation(s): Actor, writer, director
- Partner: Mark Holmes

James Vasquez (born c. 1972), also known as Pedro James Vasquez, is an American actor, writer, and director.

== Early life and education ==
Vasquez is originally from Escondido, California, United States. He graduated from Escondido High School in 1990 and from New York City's Juilliard School in 1994. At Juilliard he was a member of the Drama Division's Group 23, which also included Carrie Preston. He is a cousin of actor Randy Vasquez, who also grew up in Escondido. He is of Mexican ancestry.

== Career ==
As an actor, Vasquez has appeared off Broadway with The Public Theater in New York City, at the Old Globe Theatre in San Diego, and in the Alabama Shakespeare Festival.

In 2004, he co-founded Daisy 3 Pictures with Mark Holmes and Carrie Preston.

Vasquez had his screen writing debut with the 2005 feature film 29th and Gay, which he also starred in. He edited the 2007 short film Feet of Clay, and wrote and directed the 2008 film Ready? OK!.
