= That's What She Said (film) =

American comedy film

- Film poster
- Directed by: Carrie Preston
- Written by: Kellie Overbey
- Produced by: Carrie Preston; Tai Burkholder; Mona Panchal; Lucy Barzun Donnelly
- Starring: Marcia DeBonis; Anne Heche; Alia Shawkat; Miriam Shor
- Cinematography: William Klayer
- Edited by: Anita Brandt-Burgoyne
- Production company: Daisy 3 Pictures
- Distributed by: Phase 4 Films
- Release dates: January 20, 2012 (Sundance); October 19, 2012
- Running time: 84 minutes
- Country: United States
- Language: English
- Budget: $500,000

That's What She Said is a 2012 American comedy film directed by Carrie Preston, written by Kellie Overbey, and starring Marcia DeBonis, Anne Heche, Alia Shawkat, and Miriam Shor.

== Plot ==
As Bebe prepares for a big date, her best friend Dee Dee offers nothing but cynical barbs. Meanwhile, sex-crazed Clementine wanders into their lives, sparking a wild adventure through the streets of New York City.

== Cast ==
- Marcia DeBonis as Bebe
- Anne Heche as Dee Dee
- Alia Shawkat as Clementine
- Miriam Shor as Rhoda
- Mandy Siegfried as Mary
- Michael Emerson as uncredited background character

== Release ==
The film premiered at the 2012 Sundance Film Festival on January 20, 2012, and proceeded to get a limited release on October 19, 2012. After a new release was coming out on November 12, 2024

== Reception ==
On review aggregator website Rotten Tomatoes, the film has an approval rating of 8% based on 12 critics, with an average rating of 3/10. On Metacritic, That's What She Said holds a rank of 22 out of a 100 based on 5 critics, indicating "generally unfavorable reviews".

Gary Goldstein of the Los Angeles Times wrote: "It's all directed - and played - at fever pitch with an egregious disregard for real-world comportment".

Writing for Entertainment Weekly, Lisa Schwarzbaum commented: "If you see just one repellent femme-owned-and-operated comedy about unpleasant women and a stubborn case of vaginal yeast infection, you might as well make it That's What She Said, since I hope there'll never be another like it".

Matt Singer of Time Out admired the acting by the three lead actresses but mentioned that "it's frustrating, however, when all they get to do is complain about guys who are totally absent from the film".

That's What She Said was also criticized by Stephanie Zacharek of NPR who said: "The road to hell is paved not just with good intentions, but with movies that attempt to capture the way women really talk".

Rachel Saltz of The New York Times pointed out that the film is an "unpleasant comedy about friendship", which "aims to be a female twist on the bromance". She then added: "[Despite its] crude and knockabout [humor], it nonetheless has–like many a bromance–a sloppy, sentimental heart".

Women's lifestyle magazine Bust admitted that "[the director] navigates the everyday crises of modern womanhood with a style of humor that is usually only applied to men", while Nick McCarthy of Slant Magazine called the film "an embarrassing girls-behaving-badly indie romp".
