= Daisy 3 Pictures =

Production Company

Daisy 3 Pictures is an independent film production company.

Daisy 3 Pictures was founded in 2004 by film producer Mark Holmes, writer and director James Vasquez, and actress Carrie Preston. The company is based in San Diego, California, United States.

Works produced by Daisy 3 Pictures include the 2005 comedy 29th and Gay, the 2008 feature film Ready? OK!, and the 2007 short film Feet of Clay. The next project in pre-production is Girl Talk.
