= BFFs =

- Film poster
- Directed by: Andrew Putschoegl
- Written by: Andrew Putschoegl; Andrea Grano; Tara Karsian
- Produced by: Andrea Grano; Tara Karsian
- Starring: Tara Karsian; Andrea Grano
- Cinematography: Andrew Huebscher
- Edited by: Corey Ziemniak
- Music by: Paul Buckley
- Production company: Sneaky Pete Productions
- Release date: January 31, 2014 (Santa Barbara)
- Running time: 90 minutes
- Country: United States
- Language: English

BFFs is a 2014 American comedy film directed by Andrew Putschoegl. It stars Tara Karsian and Andrea Grano, both of whom also wrote the screenplay and co-produced it with Putschoegl. It serves as the final film role of Pat Carroll, who was Karsian's mother, as she died in 2022.

== Plot ==
When two straight friends go into couples therapy, they're so convincing that even they start to question their relationship.

== Cast ==
- Tara Karsian as Kat
- Andrea Grano as Samantha
- Sigrid Thornton as Jacqueline
- Patrick O'Connor as Bob
- Jenny O'Hara as Suzie
- Richard Moll as Ken
- Sean Maher as J.K.
- Russell Sams as Jonah
- Larisa Oleynik as Chloe
- Jeffrey Vincent Parise as Scott
- Dan Gauthier as David
- Molly Hagan as Rebecca
- Eric Lively as Tom
- Pat Carroll as Joan
