= Feat of Clay =

Feat of Clay may refer to:

- "Feat of Clay" (Batman: The Animated Series), a 1992 two-part TV episode
- "Feat of Clay" (Birds of Prey), a 2003 TV episode

== See also ==
- Feet of Clay (disambiguation)
