= 29th and Gay =

2005 comedy film

- DVD cover
- Directed by: Carrie Preston
- Written by: James Vasquez
- Produced by: Sebastian Jobin
- Starring: James Vasquez; Michael Emerson; Nicole Marcks; David McBean; Mike Doyle; Annie Hinton; James Synjyn; Adam Greer; Kurt Norby
- Cinematography: Mark Holmes
- Edited by: Mark Holmes; Carrie Preston; James Vasquez
- Music by: John Avila
- Distributed by: TLA Releasing
- Release date: April 2005 (Miami)
- Running time: 87 minutes
- Country: United States
- Language: English

29th and Gay is a 2005 American comedy film directed by Carrie Preston and starring James Vasquez, Nicole Marcks, David McBean, Mike Doyle, and Annie Hinton. It was Vasquez's first experience as a writer, actor, and editor. The film premiered at the 2005 Miami Gay & Lesbian Film Festival.

== Plot ==
James Sanchez is a 29-year-old gay man who feels he has reached a dead end in his life. While his best friend Roxy, an actress-turned-activist, struggles to show him there is life beyond the glitz of the disco ball, his other friend, Brandon works on getting James to socialize. Feeling out of place in the world and caught between his Hispanic-American heritage and his homosexuality, James grows, realizing that life is in the journey, not the destination.

Throughout his long journey to find a partner, James dates many different men, many of whom he meets in gay bars. He attempts to find a man online, which leads him to Mike. They go on a date, which seems to be "perfect," but Mike never calls back. Throughout his relationship troubles, James also deals with his parents, who try to be much too accepting (they buy him overly stereotypical gifts such as musicals and a sex swing for special occasions), a lack of a job, a lack of inspiration for his talents as an actor and his lack of confidence to approach the man he has a crush on, the hot and sexy coffee barista in the cafe down the street. After going through friendship troubles, all too depressing moments and losing his apartment's electricity, he struggles his way back into life by getting an acting job and perhaps finding the man of his dreams.

== Cast ==
- James Vasquez as James Sanchez
- Nicole Marcks as Roxy Hymen
- David McBean as Brandon Bouvier / Shakespeare Musical Performer
- Mike Doyle as Andy Griffith
- Annie Hinton as Mom
- Kali Rocha as Clinic Nurse
- Michael Emerson as "Gorilla" Co-Worker
- Adam Greer as Steve
- James Synjyn as Dad
- Kurt Norby as Mike
- Rob MacAuley as Troy
- Ari Lerner as James, age 8
- Edward Ortiz Vásquez as James, age 13
- Zev Lerner as James, age 14
- Rachel Pearson as Sally Guadalajara
- Sandra Ellis-Troy as Madame Paula
