= Critics' Choice Television Award for Best Guest Performer in a Drama Series =

The Critics' Choice Television Award for Best Guest Performer in a Drama Series was one of the award categories presented annually by the Critics' Choice Television Awards (BTJA) to recognize the work done by television actors. It was introduced in 2012 and last presented in 2016. The winners were selected by a group of television critics that are part of the Broadcast Television Critics Association.

== Winners and nominees ==
indicates the winner

=== 2010s ===
Year	Performer	Series	Role
2012	Lucy Liu	Southland	Officer Jessica Tang
2012	Dylan Baker	Damages	Jerry Boorman
2012	Jere Burns	Justified	Wynn Duffy
2012	Loretta Devine	Grey's Anatomy	Adele Webber
2012	Carrie Preston	The Good Wife	Elsbeth Tascioni
2012	Chloe Webb	Shameless	Monica Gallagher
2013	Jane Fonda	The Newsroom	Leona Lansing
2013	Jim Beaver	Justified	Sheriff Shelby Parlow
2013	Martha Plimpton	The Good Wife	Patti Nyholm
2013	Carrie Preston	The Good Wife	Elsbeth Tascioni
2013	Diana Rigg	Game of Thrones	Lady Olenna Tyrell
2013	Jimmy Smits	Sons of Anarchy	Nero Padilla
2014	Allison Janney	Masters of Sex	Margaret Scully
2014	Beau Bridges	Masters of Sex	Provost Barton Scully
2014	Walton Goggins	Sons of Anarchy	Venus Van Dam
2014	Joe Morton	Scandal	Rowan "Eli" Pope
2014	Carrie Preston	The Good Wife	Elsbeth Tascioni
2014	Diana Rigg	Game of Thrones	Lady Olenna Tyrell
2015	Sam Elliott	Justified	Avery Markham
2015	Walton Goggins	Sons of Anarchy	Venus Van Dam
2015	Linda Lavin	The Good Wife	Joy Grubick
2015	Julianne Nicholson	Masters of Sex	Dr. Lillian DePaul
2015	Lois Smith	The Americans	Betty Turner
2015	Cicely Tyson	How to Get Away with Murder	Ophelia Hartness
2016 (1)	Margo Martindale	The Good Wife	Ruth Eastman
2016 (1)	Richard Armitage	Hannibal	Francis Dolarhyde
2016 (1)	Justin Kirk	Manhattan	Joseph Bucher
2016 (1)	Patti LuPone	Penny Dreadful	Joan Clayton
2016 (1)	Marisa Tomei	Empire	Mimi Whiteman
2016 (1)	B. D. Wong	Mr. Robot	Whiterose
2016 (2)	Jeffrey Dean Morgan	The Walking Dead	Negan
2016 (2)	Mahershala Ali	House of Cards	Remi Danton
2016 (2)	Lisa Bonet	Ray Donovan	Marisol
2016 (2)	Ellen Burstyn	House of Cards	Elizabeth Hale
2016 (2)	Michael J. Fox	The Good Wife	Louis Canning
2016 (2)	Jared Harris	The Crown	King George VI

== Multiple nominations ==
3 nominations

- Carrie Preston

2 nominations

- Diana Rigg

== See also ==
- Primetime Emmy Award for Outstanding Guest Actor in a Drama Series
- Primetime Emmy Award for Outstanding Guest Actress in a Drama Series
