= Straight-Jacket =

- Directed by: Richard Day
- Written by: Richard Day
- Based on: Straight-Jacket by Richard Day
- Produced by: Michael Warwick
- Starring: Matt Letscher; Carrie Preston; Michael Emerson
- Distributed by: Regent Releasing here! Films; Strand Releasing
- Release date: November 26, 2004
- Running time: 96 minutes
- Country: United States
- Language: English
- Budget: $1.5 million
- Box office: $45,497

Straight-Jacket is a 2004 comedy film written and directed by Richard Day, based on his play. Done as a pastiche of the Rock Hudson-Doris Day romantic comedy films, Straight-Jacket tells the story of Guy Stone, a closeted gay actor in the 1950s who is modeled on Hudson.

== Plot ==
Guy Stone (Matt Letscher) is blissfully closeted, picking up tricks for one-night-stands, while capturing the country's heart as "America's most eligible bachelor" (starring in such films as The Love Barrel and I Married the Ghost). However, Guy's carefully managed façade collapses when he comes up for the lead in S.R.O. studio's version of Ben-Hur. Things turn sour for the film idol when a fellow actor, Freddie Stevens (Jack Plotnick) (famous in the film for portraying "Captain Astro" in a succession of Buck Rogers or Flash Gordon-type serial films), decides to steal the lead in Ben-Hur from Guy by taking a picture of Guy exiting a gay bar. Freddie plans to out Guy to the world and ruin his career. Jerry (Veronica Cartwright), Guy's repressed lesbian ball-bustingly ambitious agent, connives to cover up the impending outing and ensure Guy the role in Ben-Hur by marrying her client off with great fanfare to the studio head's secretary, Sally (Carrie Preston), who just happens to also be a slavishly devoted Guy Stone fan. However, Sally isn't aware the marriage is a sham.

To avoid his adoring new bride as much as possible, Guy has Jerry sign him onto the next available film, which turns out to be 'Blood Mine' — a disastrously arch pro-union film about the corrupt goings on at a coal mine (with lines like 'how can they call this a MINE when everything is THEIRS!?!'). The studio head, in fear of the red-baiting going on in Hollywood at the time, decides — true to Hollywood stereotype — rather than stop production on the film to instead water down the pro-union content wherever possible. The young, idealistic, and terribly handsome writer of the novel that the film is based on, Rick Foster, quickly gets roped into convoluting the plot of this already-bad adaptation of his heartfelt book largely because of a chance meeting between him and the film's star, Guy. The attraction the two men feel for one another is instantaneous and propels the rest of the plot forward.

== Cast ==
- Matt Letscher as Guy Stone, a closeted homosexual Rock Hudson-like actor
- Carrie Preston as Sally Stone, a wild Guy Stone fanatic and the studio's head secretary
- Adam Greer as Rick Foster
- Veronica Cartwright as Jerry Albrecht, Guy's repressed lesbian agent
- Jack Plotnick as Freddie Stevens, a neurotic actor out to reveal Guy's secret
- Michael Emerson as Victor
- Sam Pancake as Tour Guide

Jackie Hoffman, who originated the role of Jerry in the stage play, was asked to reprise her role, but couldn't due to Hairspray: The Musical.
