= Pat Carroll =

American actress and comedian (1927–2022)

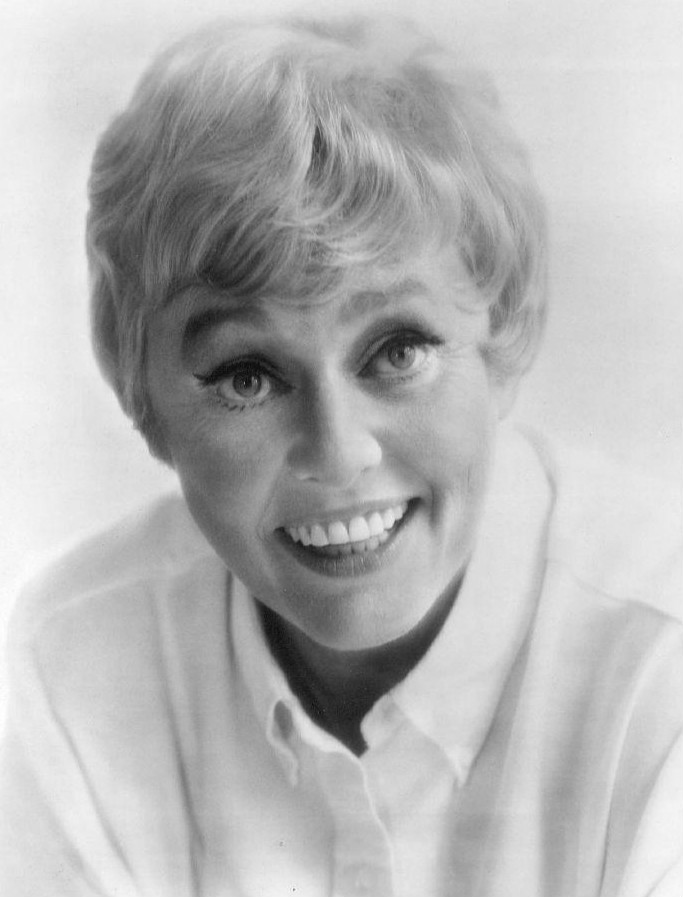
- Carroll in 1972
- Born: Patricia Ann Carroll; May 5, 1927; Shreveport, Louisiana, U.S.
- Died: July 30, 2022 (aged 95); Cape Cod, Massachusetts, U.S.
- Other names: Pat Ann Carroll; Patricia Carroll
- Education: Catholic University of America
- Occupations: Actress; comedian
- Years active: 1947–2022
- Spouse: Lee Karsian (m. 1955; div. 1976)
- Children: 3, including Tara Karsian
- Awards: Primetime Emmy Award for Outstanding Supporting Actress in a Comedy Series; Grammy Award for Best Spoken Word Album; Drama Desk Award for Outstanding Actress in a Play

Patricia Ann Carroll (May 5, 1927 – July 30, 2022) was an American actress and comedian. She is best known for providing the voice of Ursula in The Little Mermaid. She made guest appearances in many popular television series including The Mary Tyler Moore Show, Laverne & Shirley, and ER; she also had a regular role on The Danny Thomas Show as Bunny Halper. Carroll was an Emmy, Drama Desk, and Grammy Award winner, as well as a Tony Award nominee.

== Early life ==
Patricia Carroll was born in Shreveport, Louisiana, on May 5, 1927, to Maurice Clifton Carroll (d. 1963) and Kathryn Angela (née Meagher). Patricia’s family moved to Los Angeles when she was five years old, and she soon began acting in local productions. She graduated from Immaculate Heart High School and attended Catholic University of America after enlisting in the United States Army as a civilian actress technician.

== Career ==
Carroll began her acting career in 1947. She got her first acting credit as Lorelei Crawford in the 1948 film Hometown Girl. In 1952, she made her television debut in The Red Buttons Show. In 1955, her Broadway debut in Catch a Star! garnered her a nomination for a Tony Award for Best Featured Actress in a Musical. In 1956, Carroll won an Emmy Award for her work on Caesar's Hour. From 1961–1964, she was a regular on the sitcom Make Room for Daddy . She guest-starred in the drama anthology series The DuPont Show with June Allyson. She co-starred in the 1965 television production of Rodgers and Hammerstein's Cinderella as "Prunella", one of the wicked stepsisters. Carroll also appeared on many variety shows of the 1950s, 1960s, and 1970s, such as The Steve Allen Show, The Danny Kaye Show, The Red Skelton Show, and The Carol Burnett Show.

In the late 1970s, Carroll's successful one-woman show, Gertrude Stein, Gertrude Stein, Gertrude Stein, by playwright Marty Martin, won several major theater awards; her recorded version won a 1980 Grammy Award for Best Spoken Word, Documentary or Drama.

In early 1976, Carroll was cast as Lily, the mother of Shirley Feeney, on the hit ABC situation comedy, Laverne & Shirley, in the episode "Mother Knows Worst" . She portrayed Pearl Markowitz, the mother of Adam Arkin's character Lenny Markowitz, in the 1977 CBS situation comedy Busting Loose. In 1978, she made a guest appearance on The Love Boat. Her television roles in the 1980s included newspaper owner Hope Stinson on the syndicated The Ted Knight Show (formerly Too Close for Comfort) during its final season in 1986, and Gussie Holt, the mother of Suzanne Somers's lead character in the syndicated sitcom She's the Sheriff (1987–1989).

Starting in the late 1980s, Carroll took several voice-over roles for cartoons, including A Pup Named Scooby-Doo, Galaxy High, Foofur, and the film A Goofy Movie. On the series Pound Puppies, she had a regular role voicing Katrina Stoneheart. On two Garfield television specials (A Garfield Christmas and Garfield's Thanksgiving), she portrayed Jon's feisty grandmother. She also voiced the character of Granny in the 2005 re-release of Hayao Miyazaki's My Neighbor Totoro.

In 1989, Carroll portrayed the sea witch Ursula in Disney's The Little Mermaid and sang "Poor Unfortunate Souls", which was later certified Platinum by RIAA. In interviews, Carroll referred to the role, her first as a villain, as one of the favorites of her career. She later reprised the role in other forms of media, including the Kingdom Hearts series of video games, the Little Mermaid television series, the Disney+ series The Wonderful World of Mickey Mouse, and various Disney theme parks attractions and shows, as well as voicing Ursula's crazy sister Morgana in the direct-to-video sequel The Little Mermaid II: Return to the Sea.

Carroll also appeared on a variety of game shows including You Don't Say, To Tell the Truth, Match Game 73, Password All-Stars, I've Got a Secret, and The $10,000 Pyramid.

A member of the Actors Studio, she also enjoyed a successful career in the theater, appearing in numerous plays including productions of Our Town and Sophocles's Electra. In 1990, she starred in The Merry Wives of Windsor at the Shakespeare Theatre at the Folger in the role of Sir John Falstaff, a balding knight with whiskers.

When drama critic Frank Rich of The New York Times reviewed her performance in The Merry Wives of Windsor, he wrote, "Her performance is a triumph from start to finish, and, I think, a particularly brave and moving one, with implications that go beyond this one production. Ms. Carroll and Mr. Kahn help revivify the argument that the right actresses can perform some of the great classic roles traditionally denied to women and make them their own. It's not a new argument, to be sure; female Hamlets stretch back into history. But what separates Ms. Carroll's Falstaff from some other similar casting experiments of late is that her performance exists to investigate a character rather than merely as ideological window dressing for a gimmicky production."

== Personal life ==
Carroll married Lee Karsian in 1955 and they had three children: one son, Sean, and two daughters, Kerry and actress Tara Karsian. The marriage ended in a divorce in 1976. Lee remarried before he died in 1991. Carroll also outlived her son Sean, who died in 2009. In 1991, Carroll received an honorary doctorate from Siena College in Albany, New York.

After reading an article claiming that video games were not for people born prior to 1965, Carroll started playing video games. While on the road for Gertrude Stein Gertrude Stein Gertrude Stein, she became a "video game junkie". She at first played at parlors, then bought herself a home computer.

=== Hanna-Barbera lawsuit ===
In 1963, Carroll filed a $12,000 lawsuit against Hanna-Barbera for breach of contract, claiming that she had been cast and signed on to the role of Jane Jetson on The Jetsons. Morey Amsterdam, who alleged that he had been cast as George, was also a plaintiff in the same suit. Although her contracts stipulated she would be paid US$500 an episode with a guarantee of twenty-four episodes (i.e., a full season), she recorded only one episode before being replaced. Several sources claimed the change had occurred as a result of sponsor conflict with Carroll's work on Make Room for Daddy. The case had been closed by early 1965 and the court had ruled in favor of Hanna-Barbera.

=== Death ===
Carroll died of pneumonia at her home on Cape Cod, Massachusetts, on July 30, 2022, at the age of 95.

== Filmography ==
=== Film ===
Year	Title	Role	Notes
1948	Hometown Girl	Lorelei Crawford	Film debut
1951	Up Front	Italian Girl	Uncredited
1968	With Six You Get Eggroll	Maxine Scott	
1973	The Brothers O'Toole	Callie Burdyne	
1984	Racing with the Moon	Mrs. Spangler	
1988	My Neighbor Totoro	Granny	Voice, 2005 Disney English dub
1989	The Little Mermaid	Ursula	Voice
2000	Songcatcher	Viney Butler	
2000	The Little Mermaid II: Return to the Sea	Morgana	Voice; direct-to-video
2001	Mickey's Magical Christmas: Snowed in at the House of Mouse	Ursula	Voice; direct-to-video
2002	Mickey's House of Villains	Ursula	Voice; direct-to-video
2005	Once Upon a Halloween	Performer of "Sidekicks and Henchmen"	Voice; direct-to-video
2007	Freedom Writers	Miep Gies	
2007	Nancy Drew	Landlady	
2010	A Turtle’s Tale: Sammy’s Adventure	Old Female Turtle	American English dub
2014	BFFs	Joan	
2023	Once Upon a Studio	Ursula	Voice (archival recordings)

=== Television ===
- The Red Buttons Show (1952–1953)
- The Saturday Night Revue (1953)
- Make Room for Daddy (1953)
- The Pepsi-Cola Playhouse (1954)
- Studio 57 (1954) – Sue
- Caesar's Hour (1954) – Alice Brewster
- Producers' Showcase (1955) – Gym teacher
- Kraft Television Theatre (1955)
- The Jimmy Durante Show (1955)
- The Steve Allen Show (1958)
- Hobby Lobby (1959)
- General Electric Theater (1959) – Frances Dowd
- The DuPont Show with June Allyson (1959) – Cherry
- The Ann Sothern Show (1961) – Pandora
- The Investigators (1961) – Blossom Taylor (episode "The Dead End Man")
- The United States Steel Hour (1961)
- The Danny Thomas Show (1961–1964) - Bunny Halper
- The Red Skelton Show (1962)
- Cinderella (1965) – Prunella
- Please Don't Eat the Daisies (1966) – Carol Baker
- The Carol Burnett Show (1971) – Herself; Two appearances in 1971 (Season 4, Episodes 16 and 23)
- The Mary Tyler Moore Show (1971) – Loretta Kuhne
- The Interns (1971) – Maria
- Love, American Style (1970–1971)
- Getting Together (1971–1972) – Rita Simon
- Police Story (1974) – Mrs. Gail Bannister
- Nakia (1974) – Belle Jones in episode "A Matter of Choice"
- Laverne & Shirley (1976) – Lily Feeney
- Good Heavens (1976) – Harriet
- Busting Loose (1977) – Pearl Markowitz
- Police Woman (1977) – Miriam Stein
- The Love Boat (1978) – Muriel
- Legends of the Superheroes (1979) – Esther Hall
- Trapper John, M.D. (1985) – Aunt Mo
- Crazy Like a Fox (1985)
- Yogi's Treasure Hunt (1985) – Additional Voices
- Pound Puppies (1986) – Katrina Stoneheart (voice)
- Galaxy High School (1986) – Ms. Biddy McBrain (voice)
- Foofur (1986–1987) – Hazel (voice)
- Too Close for Comfort (1986–1987) – Mrs. Hope Stinson
- A Garfield Christmas (1987) – Grandma (voice)
- She's the Sheriff (1987–1989) – Gussie Holt
- Superman (1988) – Queen Hippolyta (voice)
- A Pup Named Scooby-Doo (1989) – Paula P. Casso (voice)
- Garfield's Thanksgiving (1989) – Grandma (voice)
- Chip 'n Dale Rescue Rangers (1990) – Koo-Koo (voice)
- Designing Women (1993) – Mrs. Billie Beecham
- The Little Mermaid (1993–1994) – Ursula (voice)
- The Royale (1996) – Mildred Wak
- House of Mouse (2001–2002) – Ursula (voice, 3 episodes)
- ER (2005) – Rebecca Chadwick (3 episodes)
- Tangled: The Series (2017–2018) – Old Lady Crowley (voice, short "Make Me Smile" and episodes "One Angry Princess", "Max's Enemy" and "Secret of the Sun Drop")
- The Wonderful World of Mickey Mouse (2020) – Ursula (voice, episode "Keep on Rollin")

=== Video games ===
- Kingdom Hearts (2002) – Ursula (voice)
- Kingdom Hearts II (2005) – Ursula (voice)
- Kingdom Hearts 3D: Dream Drop Distance (2012) – Ursula (voice)
- Disney Princess: My Fairytale Adventure (2012) – Ursula (voice)
- Disney Dreamlight Valley (2023) – Ursula (voice; final role, released posthumously)

=== Theme parks ===
- Fantasmic! - Ursula (voice)

=== Stage ===
Year	Title	Role(s)	Notes	Ref.
1955	Catch a Star!	performer	Broadway debut Tony Award nomination	
1973	Anything Goes	Reno Sweeney		
1975	Something's Afoot			
1979	Gertrude Stein Gertrude Stein Gertrude Stein	Gertrude Stein	Drama Desk Award	
1984	Dancing in the End Zone	Madeleine Bernard		
1986	Romeo and Juliet	Nurse		
1989	Cinderella	Fairy Godmother		
1990	The Merry Wives of Windsor	Falstaff		
1992	The Show-Off	Mrs. Fisher		
1993	Mother Courage and Her Children	Mother Courage		
1996	Volpone	Volpone		
1998	Grace and Glorie	Grace		
1998	Electra	Chorus of Mycenae		
2000	Thoroughly Modern Millie	Mrs. Meers	Pre-Broadway production	
2002	Our Town	The Stage Manager		

== Awards and nominations ==
Year	Award	Category	Nominated work	Result
1956	Tony Awards	Best Featured Actress in a Musical	Catch a Star!	Nominated
1957	Primetime Emmy Awards	Best Supporting Performance by an Actress	Caesar's Hour	Won
1958	Primetime Emmy Awards	Best Continuing Supporting Performance by an Actress in a Dramatic or Comedy Series	Caesar's Hour	Nominated
1980	Drama Desk Awards	Best Actress in a Play	Gertrude Stein, Gertrude Stein, Gretrude Stein	Won
1980	Outer Critics Circle Award	Special Award	Gertrude Stein, Gertrude Stein, Gretrude Stein	Won
1981	Grammy Awards	Best Audio Book, Narration & Storytelling Recording	Gertrude Stein, Gertrude Stein, Gretrude Stein	Won
1998	Daytime Emmy Awards	Outstanding Performer in a Children's Special	The Royale	Nominated
2001	Film Independent Spirit Awards	Best Supporting Female	Songcatcher	Nominated
2001	Sundance Film Festival Award	Best Ensemble Performance	Songcatcher	Won
