= John G. Preston =

American actor

John G. Preston is an American stage and film actor.

Preston starred as the title character in the short film Feet of Clay, and as Alex Dowd in the 2008 feature film Ready? Okay! He has also appeared in television's Law & Order and As the World Turns.

Preston has appeared on stage in the New York Shakespeare Festival, and with the Yale Repertory Theater, the John and Mable Ringling Museum of Art in conjunction with the Asolo Repertory Theatre in Sarasota, Florida, the Indiana Repertory Theatre, the Cincinnati Playhouse in the Park, and the Denver Center Theater.

Preston graduated from Florida State University in 1987.

== Filmography ==
- Law & Order (2003) (Jeff Peters) (Kid Pro Quo)
- Feet of Clay (2007) (Clay)
- Ready? OK! (2008) (Alex Dowd)
- That's What She Said (2012) (Tom)
