= Carrie Preston =

American actress (born 1967)

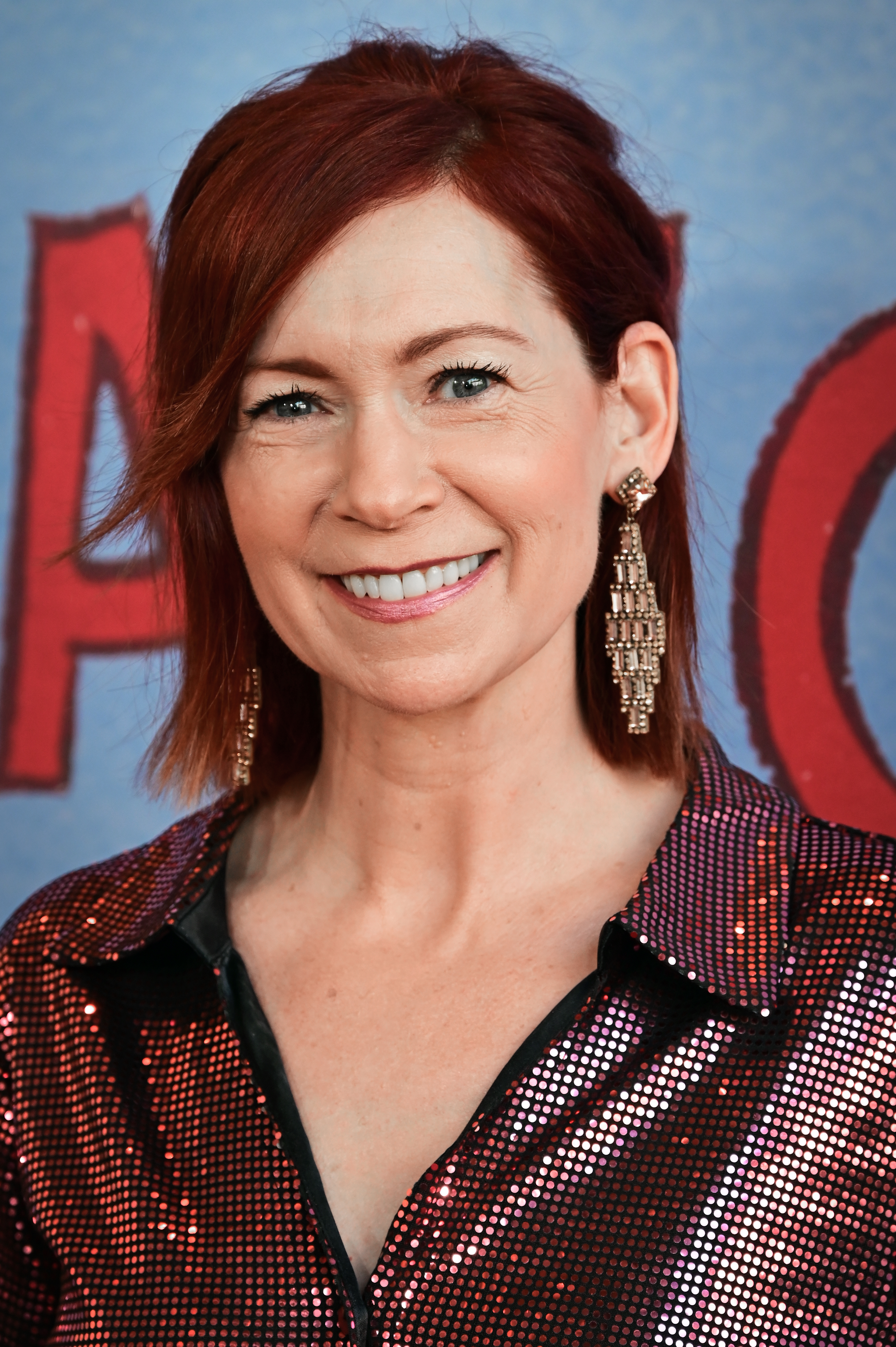
- Preston in 2026
- Born: June 21, 1967 (age 59); Macon, Georgia, U.S.
- Education: University of Evansville (BFA); Juilliard School (GrDip)
- Occupations: Actress; director; producer
- Years active: 1985–present
- Spouse: Michael Emerson (m. 1998)

Carrie Preston (born June 21, 1967) is an American actress, director, and producer. She is best known for her roles as Arlene Fowler in the HBO fantasy drama series True Blood (2008–2014) and as Elsbeth Tascioni in the CBS legal drama series The Good Wife (2010–2016) and the two spinoffs The Good Fight (2017–2022) and Elsbeth (2024–present). For her work on The Good Wife, Preston received a Primetime Emmy Award for Outstanding Guest Actress in a Drama Series.

Preston also appeared in the CBS crime drama series Person of Interest (2012–2016), the NBC comedy series Crowded (2016), and the TNT crime drama series Claws (2017–2022). She has starred in films such as the romantic comedy My Best Friend's Wedding (1997), the comedy-drama Transamerica (2005), the romantic comedy Vicky Cristina Barcelona (2008), the drama Doubt (2008), the drama To the Bone (2017), the slasher horror They/Them (2022), and the comedy-drama The Holdovers (2023).

== Early life and education ==
Preston was born in Macon, Georgia, the daughter of Pam and Ray Preston. Her brother is actor John G. Preston.

She attended the College of Charleston where she appeared in a production of The Effect of Gamma Rays on Man-in-the-Moon Marigolds. She earned her Bachelor of Fine Arts degree from the University of Evansville (1990), followed by an acting diploma from the Juilliard School's Drama Division (Group 23: 1990–1994).

== Career ==
Preston has worked on numerous projects with her husband, actor Michael Emerson, whom she married in 1998. Emerson played Ben Linus on television's Lost, and Preston was a guest star in episode 20 of season 3, "The Man Behind the Curtain" as Ben's mother Emily in flashback scenes, though she and Emerson never shared scenes together. The couple were featured in the 2004 comedy film Straight-Jacket and the 2008 feature film, Ready? OK!. She appeared in several episodes of Person of Interest as Grace Hendricks, the former fiancée of Emerson's character, Harold Finch.

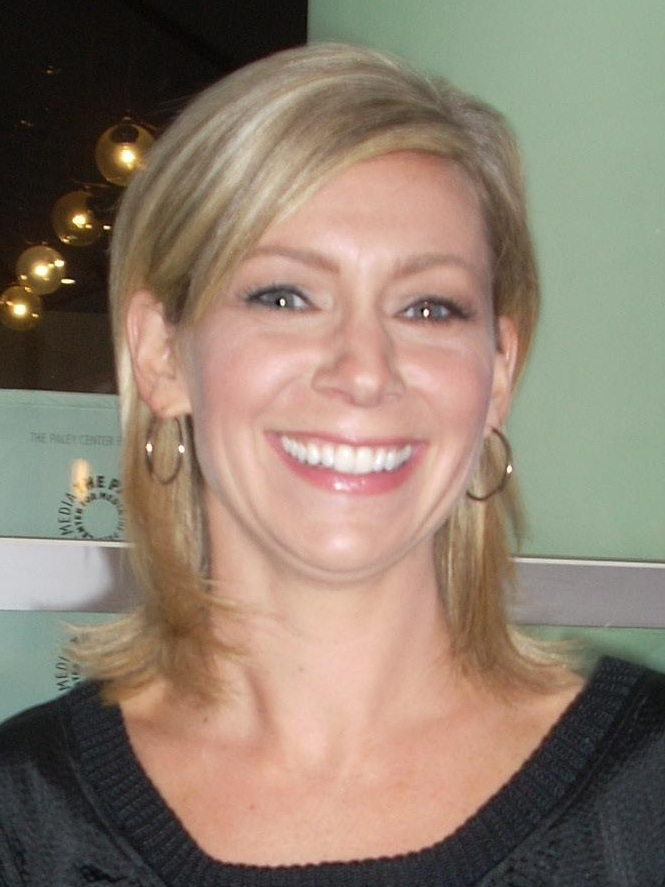
Preston in 2009

Preston is co-owner of the production company Daisy 3 Pictures with James Vasquez and Mark Holmes. For seven seasons she played Arlene Fowler on True Blood. On July 31, 2010, Preston and Emerson read A. R. Gurney's play Love Letters at the Charleston Stage; they performed it as a fundraiser for the venue.

Preston had a recurring role playing Elsbeth Tascioni, an eccentric but extremely effective trial lawyer on CBS's The Good Wife. First introduced in season one and recurring on seasons three through seven, the character was a fan favorite, and Preston won the 2013 Primetime Emmy Award for Outstanding Guest Actress in a Drama Series for her work on the show.

Preston later had a recurring character in the 2014 second season of the Kevin Bacon-led thriller, The Following. She portrayed Judy, a prostitute and ill-fated groupie of Joe Carroll. Preston has appeared in a number of films as a supporting character. Including several critically acclaimed films such as Doubt and Duplicity, where she starred alongside stars such as Meryl Streep, Viola Davis, Clive Owen, and Julia Roberts.

In 2015, she landed a leading role on the short-lived NBC comedy series Crowded where she starred opposite Patrick Warburton. In the 2015 final season of The Good Wife, she earned her second Primetime Emmy Award for Outstanding Guest Actress in a Drama Series nomination. Preston was originally slated for a four-episode arc, but due to commitments on her new show, she was able to appear only in one episode.

Preston was then cast in the drama-comedy Claws playing Polly Marks (Polly-Pol), a mild-mannered preppy with an "ankle bracelet" who recently served time in prison for identity theft. The series was greenlit for a 10-episode first season.

In 2016, Preston reprised her role as Elsbeth Tascioni on The Good Wife spin-off The Good Fight.

In 2023, CBS announced a spin-off series, Elsbeth, in which Preston would reprise her role, though as the central character. It was ordered to series on May 9, 2023, and premiered on February 29, 2024. On April 18, 2024, CBS renewed the series for a second season.

== Personal life ==
Preston married actor Michael Emerson in 1998 in her hometown of Macon, Georgia. They met while he was performing in a stage production of Hamlet in Alabama. It is his second marriage. The two later starred together in Straight-Jacket (2004). Preston portrayed Emily Linus (the mother of Emerson's character) on Lost in the flashback sequences of the episode "The Man Behind the Curtain". The two teamed up again, with Emerson portraying Preston's next-door neighbor, in the film Ready? OK! (2008). Preston also appeared in several episodes of Person of Interest as Grace Hendricks, the former fiancée of Emerson's character. In 2024, Emerson appeared alongside Preston in Elsbeth.

== Filmography ==
=== Film ===
Year	Title	Role	Notes
1985	Just a Friend	Mint Jennifer	
1997	My Best Friend's Wedding	Amanda Newhouse	
1997	The Journey	Laura Singh	
1997	For Richer or Poorer	Rebecca Yoder	
1997	Norville and Trudy	Sam	
1998	Mercury Rising	Emily Lang	
1999	Guinevere	Patty	
1999	Woman Wanted	Monica	
2000	The Legend of Bagger Vance	Idalyn Greaves	
2004	Straight-Jacket	Sally Stone	
2004	The Stepford Wives	Barbara	
2005	Transamerica	Sydney Schupak	
2007	Lovely by Surprise	Marian	
2007	Towelhead	Evelyn Vuoso	
2008	Ready? OK!	Andrea Dowd	
2008	Vicky Cristina Barcelona	Sally	
2008	Doubt	Christine Hurley	
2009	Duplicity	Barbara Bofferd	
2009	That Evening Sun	Ludie Choat	
2010	Virginia	Betty	
2010	A Bag of Hammers	Lynette Patterson	
2011	Sironia	Grace	
2013	Who's Afraid of Vagina Wolf?	Chloe / Angel Tits	
2013	Vino Veritas	Claire	
2013	Beneath the Harvest Sky	Kim	
2014	5 Flights Up	Miriam Carswell	
2016	Equity	Abby	
2016	Six LA Love Stories	Diane Mackey	
2017	To the Bone	Susan	
2017	And Then I Go	Ms. Arnold	
2017	Daisy Winters	Aunt Margaret	
2018	30 Miles from Nowhere	Sylvia	
2022	Space Oddity	Jane McAllister	
2022	They/Them	Dr. Cora Whistler	
2023	The Holdovers	Lydia Crane	

=== Television ===
==== Actress ====
Year	Title	Role	Notes
1998	Significant Others	Patti Pasternak	Episode: "My Left Kidney"
1998	Grace and Glorie	Charlene Stiles	TV film
1999	Spin City	Gayle	Episode: "Carter & Stuart & Bennett & Deirdre"
1999	Sex and the City	Madeline Dunn	Episode: "The Chicken Dance"
2001	Emeril	B.D. Benson	Main role
2003	Good Morning, Miami	Kiera	Episode: "The Slow and the Furious"
2003–04, 2006	Law & Order: Criminal Intent	Megan Colby / Doreen Whitlock / Lena Copeland	Episodes: "Zoonotic", "Magnificat", "Bedfellows"
2004	Wonderfalls	Sister Katrina	Episode: "Wound-up Penguin"
2004	Hope & Faith	Sally Jones	Episode: "Queer as Hope"
2005	Numbers	Vicky Sites	Episode: "Dirty Bomb"
2005	The Inside	Kelly Comack	Episode: "Pre-Filer"
2006	Arrested Development	Jan Eagleman	Episode: "Fakin' It"
2007	Lost	Emily Linus	Episode: "The Man Behind the Curtain"
2007	Desperate Housewives	Lucy	Episode: "You Can't Judge a Book by Its Cover"
2008–2014	True Blood	Arlene Fowler	Main role
2009	Private Practice	Yvonne Pierce	Episode: "Do the Right Thing"
2010–2016	The Good Wife	Elsbeth Tascioni	Recurring role (seasons 1, 3–7)
2011	True Blood: Jessica's Blog	Arlene Fowler	Episode: "The Ethics of Glamouring"
2011	Law & Order: Special Victims Unit	Bella Zane	Episode: "Educated Guess"
2012	Royal Pains	Jackie Van Ark	Episode: "Hurts Like a Mother"
2012–2016	Person of Interest	Grace Hendricks	Recurring role (seasons 1–3, 5)
2014	The Following	Judy	Episodes: "Resurrection", "For Joe", "Trust Me"
2014	Getting On	Denya Thorp	Episode: "The 7th Annual Christmas Card Competition"
2014	Recorded Lives	Risa	TV series
2015	Happyish	Debbie	Main role
2016	Crowded	Martina Moore	Main role
2016	Grace and Frankie	Krystle	Episode: "The Goodbyes"
2017	When We Rise	Sally Miller Gearhart	TV miniseries
2017	The Celebrity Perspective	Guest	TV series
2017	Dating Game Killer	Carol Jensen	TV film
2017–2022	The Good Fight	Elsbeth Tascioni	Recurring role and director (5 episodes)
2017–2022	Claws	Polly Marks	Main role
2018	Brockmire	Elle	Recurring role (season 2)
2018	RuPaul's Drag Race	Herself	Guest judge, episode: "The Bossy Rossy Show"
2021	Dr. Death	Robbie McClung	Episodes: "Feet of Clay", "Hardwood Floors"
2024–present	Elsbeth	Elsbeth Tascioni	Main role; also executive producer

==== Director ====
Year	Title	Episodes
2019–21	Claws	"What is Happening in America" "Chapter Three: Ambition"
2021–22	The Good Fight	"And the Fight Had Détente" "The End of Democracy"
2023	Your Honor	"Part Seventeen" "Part Eighteen"

== Stage ==
Year	Title	Role	Notes
1995	Indiscretions	Madeleine (standby)	Ethel Barrymore Theatre
1995	The Tempest	Miranda	Broadhurst Theatre
1997	Antony and Cleopatra	Octavia the Younger	The Public Theater
1998	Freedomland	Polly Underfinger	Playwrights Horizons
2000	Straight-Jacket	Sally Stone	Playhouse 91
2000	She Stoops to Conquer	Kate Hardcastle	Center Stage
2001	Who's Afraid of Virginia Woolf?	Honey	Guthrie Theater
2001	Chaucer in Rome	Sarah	Mitzi E. Newhouse Theater
2002	Boys and Girls	Shelly	Duke on 42nd Street
2002	No Foreigners Beyond This Point	Paula Wheaton	Center Stage
2004–05	The Rivals	Julia Melville	Vivian Beaumont Theater
2005	Cycling Past the Matterhorn	Amy	Harold Clurman Theater
2005	Hamlet	Ophelia	McCarter Theatre Center
2006	Festen	Mette	Music Box Theatre
2010	Love Letters	Melissa Gardner	Charleston Stage

== Other works ==
Year	Title	Notes
2005	29th & Gay	Producer, director, editor
2007	Feet of Clay	Producer, director
2008	Ready? OK!	Producer
2012	That's What She Said	Producer, director
2013	Roger, the Chicken	Producer, "Roger, the Chicken: Dinner"
2014	Darwin: The Series	Director
2014	Recorded Lives	Producer
2016	Happy Lucky Golden Tofu Panda Dragon Good Time Fun Fun Show	Producer, director

== Awards and nominations ==
Year	Association	Category	Nominated work	Result
2008	FilmOut San Diego	Best Narrative Feature	Ready? OK!	Won
2008	FilmOut San Diego	Best Actress	Ready? OK!	Won
2009	SXSW Film Festival	Best Ensemble	That Evening Sun	Won
2009	Satellite Awards	Best Ensemble	True Blood	Won
2010	Screen Actors Guild Awards	Outstanding Performance by an Ensemble in a Drama Series	True Blood	Nominated
2012	SoHo International Film Festival	Best Showcase Feature Film	That's What She Said	Nominated
2012	Golden Derby TV Awards	Drama Guest Actress	The Good Wife	Nominated
2012	Critics' Choice Television Award	Critics' Choice Television Award for Best Guest Performer in a Drama Series	The Good Wife	Nominated
2013	Golden Derby TV Awards	Drama Guest Actress	The Good Wife	Nominated
2013	Critics' Choice Television Award	Critics' Choice Television Award for Best Guest Performer in a Drama Series	The Good Wife	Nominated
2013	Primetime Emmy Award	Primetime Emmy Award for Outstanding Guest Actress in a Drama Series	The Good Wife	Won
2014	Golden Derby TV Awards	Drama Guest Actress	The Good Wife	Nominated
2014	Critics' Choice Television Award	Critics' Choice Television Award for Best Guest Performer in a Drama Series	The Good Wife	Nominated
2016	Primetime Emmy Award	Primetime Emmy Award for Outstanding Guest Actress in a Drama Series	The Good Wife	Nominated
