= Tara Karsian =

American actress and writer

- Occupations: Actress, writer
- Years active: 1989–present
- Mother: Pat Carroll

Tara Karsian is an American actress and writer. She is the daughter of actress Pat Carroll.

== Early life ==
Karsian is the daughter of actress Pat Carroll and Lee Karsian. She is of Armenian descent through her father.

== Career ==
Karsian began her career appearing in episodes of Married... with Children, Who's the Boss?, Designing Women, Walker, Texas Ranger, and The X Files, along with recurring roles on the short-lived sitcoms Baby Talk, and Life's Work. In 2000s, Karsian also played many small parts on television series such as NYPD Blue, Desperate Housewives, CSI: Crime Scene Investigation, and Prison Break.

Karsian was regular cast member in the unaired HBO series, 12 Miles of Bad Road starring Lily Tomlin and Mary Kay Place. She had the recurring role as Liz Dade in the NBC medical drama, ER from 2005 to 2009. Her film credits include The Number 23, Single White Female, Envy, and Boys Life 3. In 2008, Karsian appeared as Sister Vivian in the independent film Ready? OK!. In 2009, she acted in the comedy play Women Behind Bars at the Celebration Theatre in Los Angeles.

Karsian has co-written and co-starred with Andrea Grano in the 2014 independent comedy film BFFs, which featured her mother, Pat Carroll.

== Filmography ==
=== Film ===
Year	Title	Role	Notes
1992	Single White Female	Mannish Applicant	
2000	Boys Life 3	Woman at Group Therapy	
2004	Envy	Lab Assistant	
2006	Outside Sales	Dominique	
2007	The Number 23	Box Company Clerk	
2007	The Pink Conspiracy	Mrs. Reilly	
2008	Ready? OK!	Sister Vivian	
2010	Gerald	Ethel	
2011	Terri	Mrs. Davidson	
2012	Sassy Pants	Bank Teller	
2013	The Big Ask	Ms. CP	
2013	First Period	Ms. Wood	
2014	BFFs	Kat	Writer and producer
2016	People You May Know	Philomena	
2017	Wind River	Ingrid	Uncredited
2019	Mother's Little Helpers	Auntie Trashcan	
2019	The Cleansing Hour	Possessed Lane	
TBA	Fluorescent Beast	Ms. Sneed	

=== Television ===
Year	Title	Role	Notes
1989, 1990	Who's the Boss?	Debbie / Student #1	2 episodes
1990	ALF	Ellen	Episode: "True Colors"
1990	In the Heat of the Night	Willa Mastin	Episode: "Quick Fix"
1990	Designing Women	Ross	Episode: "And Now, Here's Bernice"
1991	Evening Shade	Woman	2 episodes
1992	Baby Talk	Lillian	5 episodes
1993	Married... with Children	Woman at Shoe Store	Episode: "Scared Single"
1996	Walker, Texas Ranger	Nikki Warren	Episode: "Behind the Badge"
1996	Life's Work	Emily	3 episodes
1996. 1997	Silk Stalkings	Marnie Willis	2 episodes
1996, 1997	Boston Common	Patsy / Beatrice	2 episodes
1998	Brooklyn South	Violet Squalante	Episode: "Violet Inviolate"
1999	Working	Cleaning Woman	Episode: "She Loves Me Yeah, Yeah, Yeah"
2000	The X-Files	Coroner's Assistant	Episode: "X-Cops"
2000	Manhattan, AZ	Ann	Episode: "Lt. Colonel's Boy"
2000	Cover Me	Jeanette	Episode: "Turtle Soup"
2001	Emeril	Nurse Amy Smearball	4 episodes
2002	Reba	Connie	Episode: "Switch"
2003	Presidio Med	Darlene	Episode: "Suffer Unto Me the Children..."
2003	Everybody Loves Raymond	Jean	Episode: "Sweet Charity"
2003	NYPD Blue	Tish	Episode: "Nude Awakening"
2003	Six Feet Under	'Dr. Dave' Coordinator	Episode: "Making Love Work"
2005	Desperate Housewives	Sarah	Episode: "Move On"
2005	CSI: Crime Scene Investigation	Jill Paisley	Episode: "Big Middle"
2005	Complete Savages	Doris	Episode: "Crimes and Mini-Wieners"
2005	Malcolm in the Middle	Shelly	Episode: "Health Insurance"
2005	Without a Trace	Laurie	Episode: "When Darkness Falls"
2005–2009	ER	Liz Dade	7 episodes
2006	In Justice	Mary Beth Terzian	Episode: "The Ten Percenter"
2006	Bones	Diane Child	Episode: "The Boy in the Shroud"
2006	Lovespring International	Figgy Kristopher	3 episodes
2007	The Singles Table	Nurse #2	Episode: "The Emergency"
2007	The New Adventures of Old Christine	Dot	Episode: "Strange Bedfellows"
2007	Entourage	SAG woman	Episode: "Gary's Desk"
2007	Saving Grace	Sam Delpino	Episode: "Keep Your Damn Wings Off My Nephew"
2008	Hit Factor	Tara	Television film
2008	Prison Break	Georgie	2 episodes
2008	12 Miles of Bad Road	Deputy Deborah Falcon	5 episodes
2008, 2010	The Mentalist	Medical Examiner	2 episodes
2009	Group	Dr. Ellen Berg	Television film
2009	Rise and Fall of Tuck Johnson	Petunia Childs	Television film
2010	In Plain Sight	June Rorchek	Episode: "Son of Mann"
2010	Svetlana	Casting Director	Episode: "Crystal Methdown"
2011	Better with You	Arletta	Episode: "Better with the Baby"
2012	The Exes	Mildred	Episode: "Three Men and a Maybe"
2012	Waffle Hut	Dr. Keel	Television film
2013	Shameless	Celia	2 episodes
2014	Anger Management	Phyllis	2 episodes
2014–2015	Liv and Maddie	Mrs. Kneebauer	3 episodes
2014–2017	Review	Lucille	21 episodes
2015	Blood & Oil	Van Ness	5 episodes
2016	Last Will and Testicle	Cathy	2 episodes
2016	The GPS Zone	Loraine	Television film
2016	Preacher	Travel Agent	Episode: "Finish the Song"
2016	Brooklyn Nine-Nine	Mara Ciprioni	Episode: "Monster in the Closet"
2016	Shut Eye	Fabiana	2 episodes
2017	Dropping the Soap	Cindy	Episode: "Drama-Con"
2017	Doubt	Tanya	8 episodes
2017	K.C. Undercover	Crystal	Episode: "KC Under Construction"
2017	The Young and the Restless	Judge Savala	Episode #1.11344
2018	Beerfest: Thirst for Victory	Brenda	Television film
2018	Love Daily	Mrs. White	Episode: "Group"
2018, 2022	9-1-1	Ruth	2 episodes
2019	I'm Sorry	Nadia	Episode: "Little Louse on the Prairie"
2019	The Magicians	The Prophet	Episode: "Home Improvement"
2019	Dead to Me	Principal Erica Brewer	Episode: "Oh My God"
2019	Undone	Bathrobe Woman	Episode: "Handheld Blackjack"
2019	American Horror Story: 1984	Chef Bertie Clifford	3 episodes
2021–present	The Morning Show	Gayle Burns	7 episodes
2022	I Love That for You	Nurse Shannon	Episode: "GottaHaveIt"
2025	The Residence	Anne Dodge	Episode: "The Mystery of the Yellow Room"
