= Mark Holmes (filmmaker) =

American independent filmmaker

Mark Holmes is an American independent filmmaker.

Holmes cofounded the San Diego–based film company Daisy 3 Pictures in 2004 with writer and director James Vasquez and actress Carrie Preston, and is responsible for the company's general operations.

Holmes served as executive producer for the 2005 feature film 29th and Gay, the 2007 short film Feet of Clay, and the 2008 feature film Ready? OK!.
