= 2nd Critics' Choice Television Awards =

2012 American television awards

- Date: June 18, 2012
- Location: The Beverly Hilton, Los Angeles
- Country: United States
- Presented by: Broadcast Television Journalists Association

Highlights
- Most awards: Breaking Bad; Homeland; Modern Family; Parks and Recreation; Sherlock (2)
- Most nominations: Community (6)
- Best Comedy Series: Community
- Best Drama Series: Homeland
- Website: www.criticschoice.com

The 2nd Critics' Choice Television Awards ceremony, presented by the Broadcast Television Journalists Association (BTJA), honored the best in primetime television programming from June 1, 2011, until May 31, 2012, and was held on June 18, 2012, at The Beverly Hilton in Los Angeles, California. The nominations were announced on June 5, 2012.

== Winners and nominees ==
Winners are listed first and highlighted in boldface:

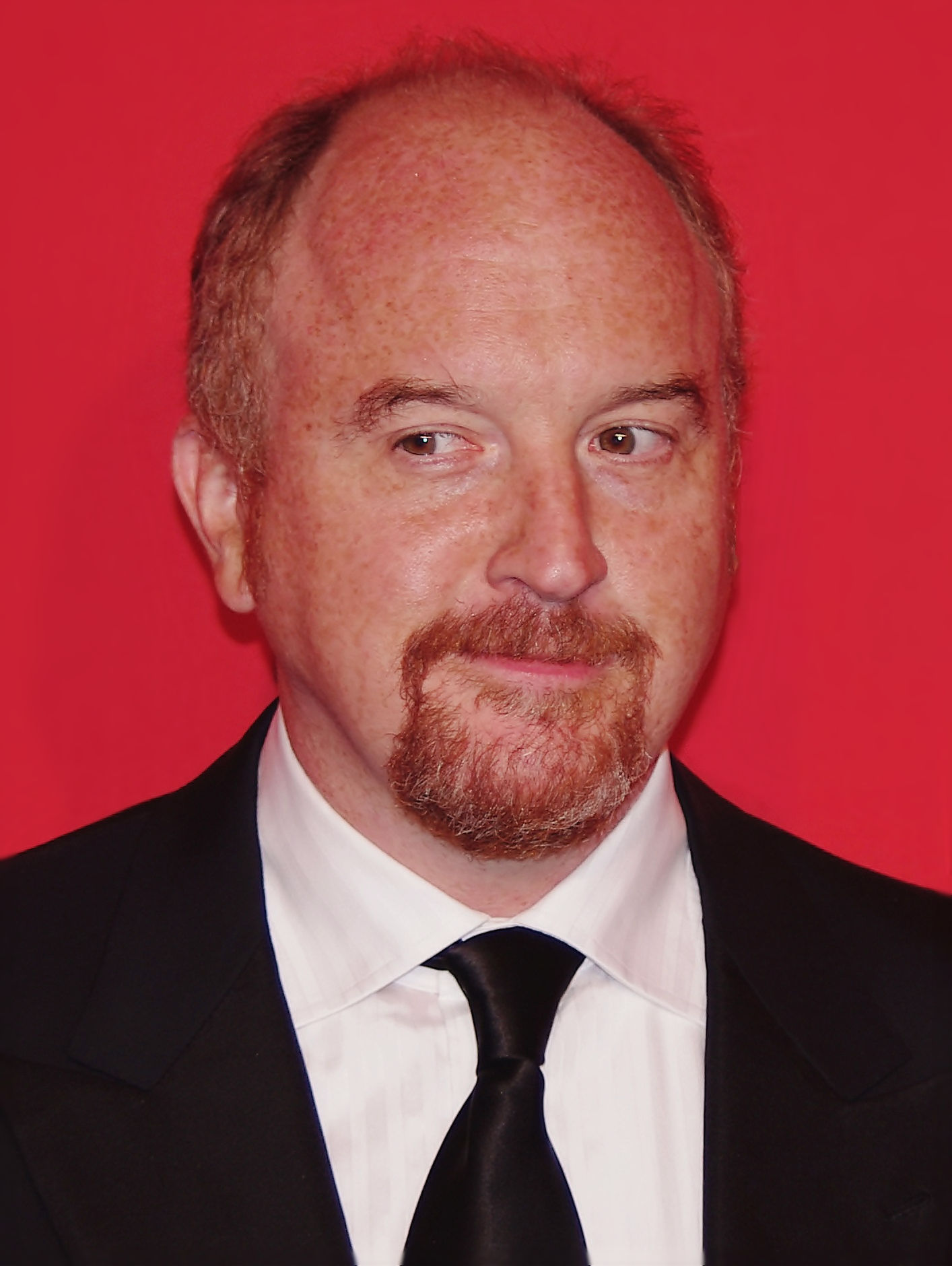
Louis C.K., Best Actor in a Comedy Series winner

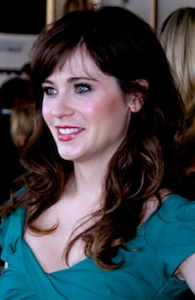
Zooey Deschanel, Best Actress in a Comedy Series co-winner

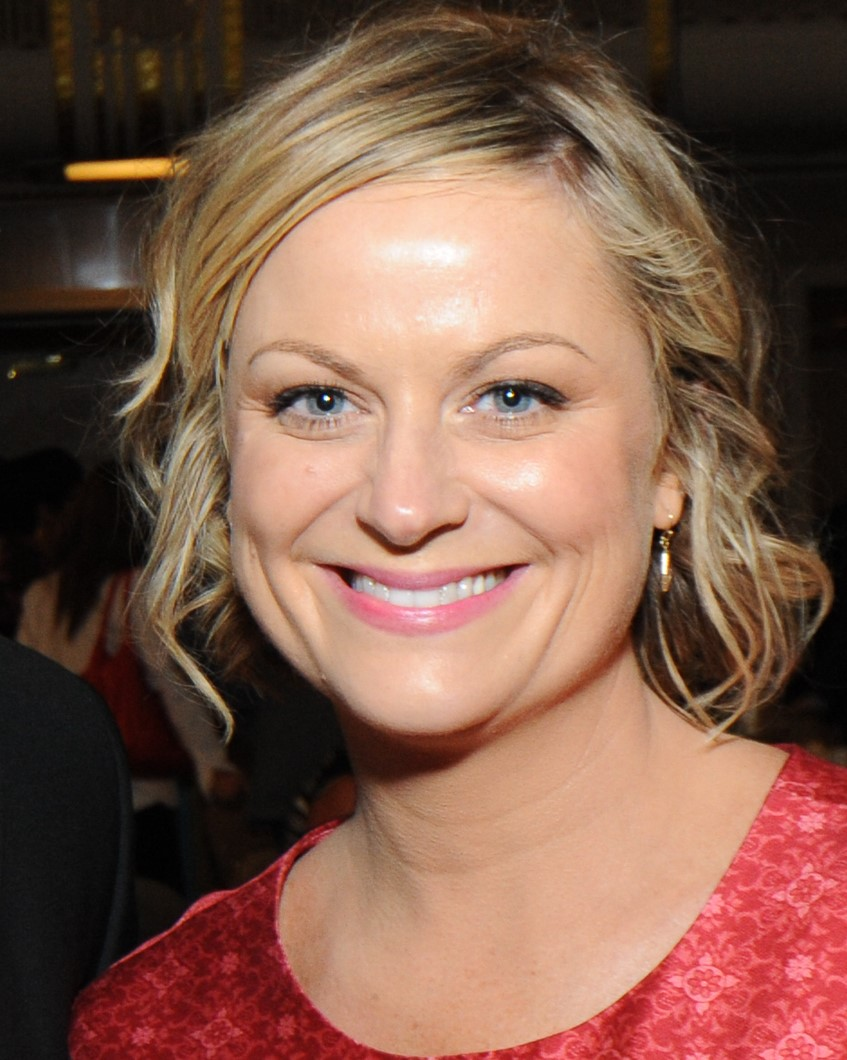
Amy Poehler, Best Actress in a Comedy Series co-winner

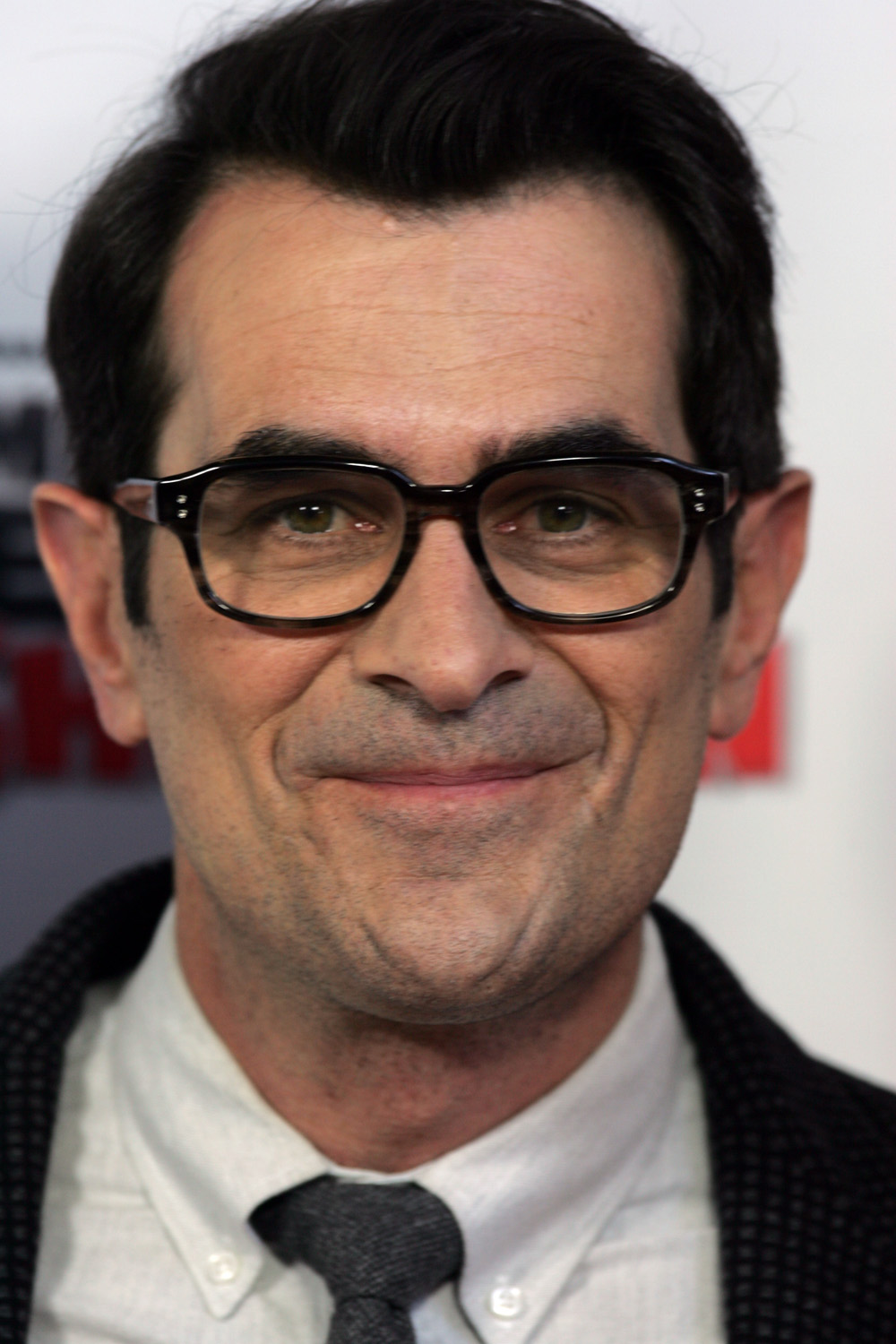
Ty Burrell, Best Supporting Actor in a Comedy Series winner

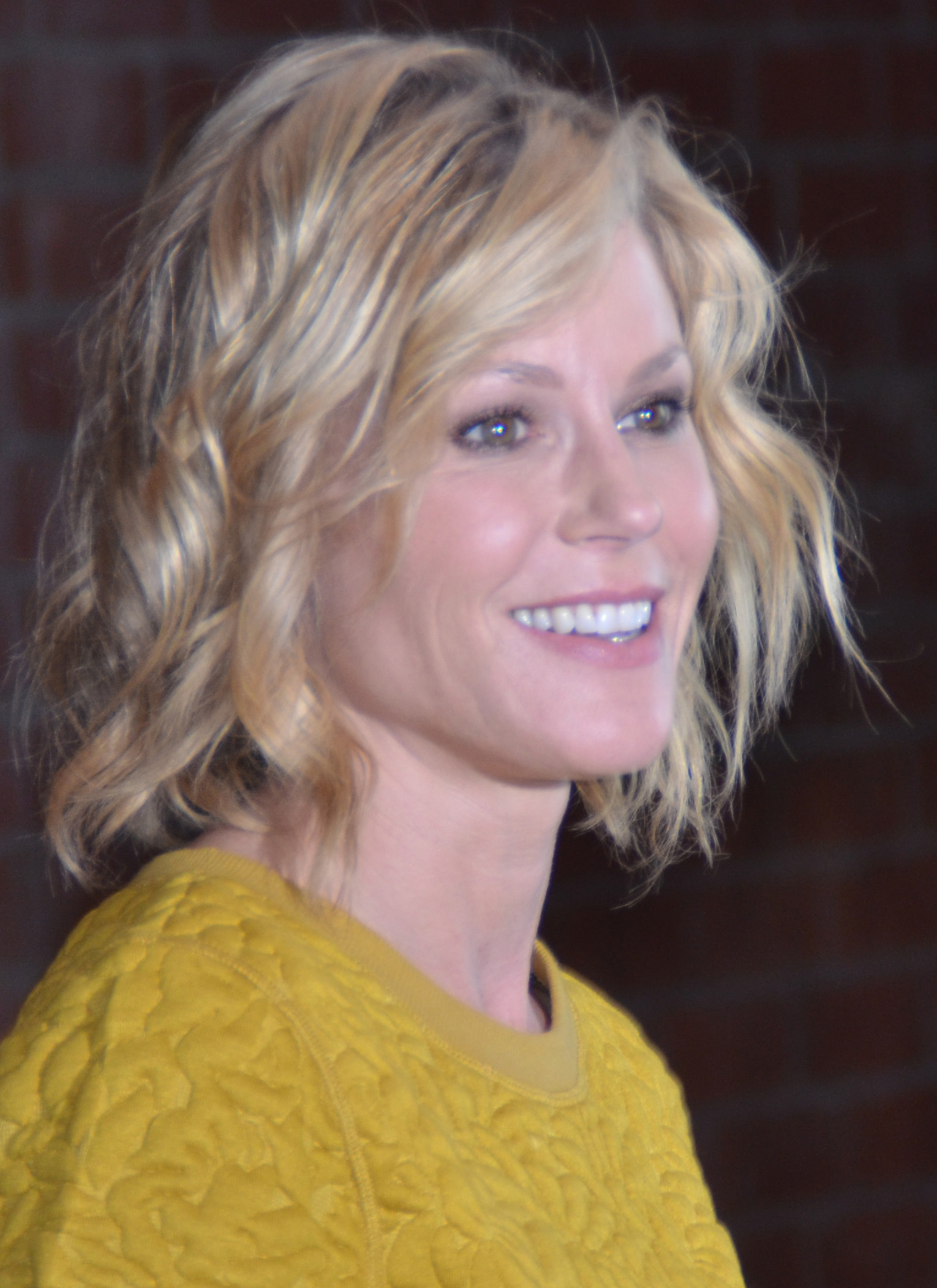
Julie Bowen, Best Supporting Actress in a Comedy Series winner

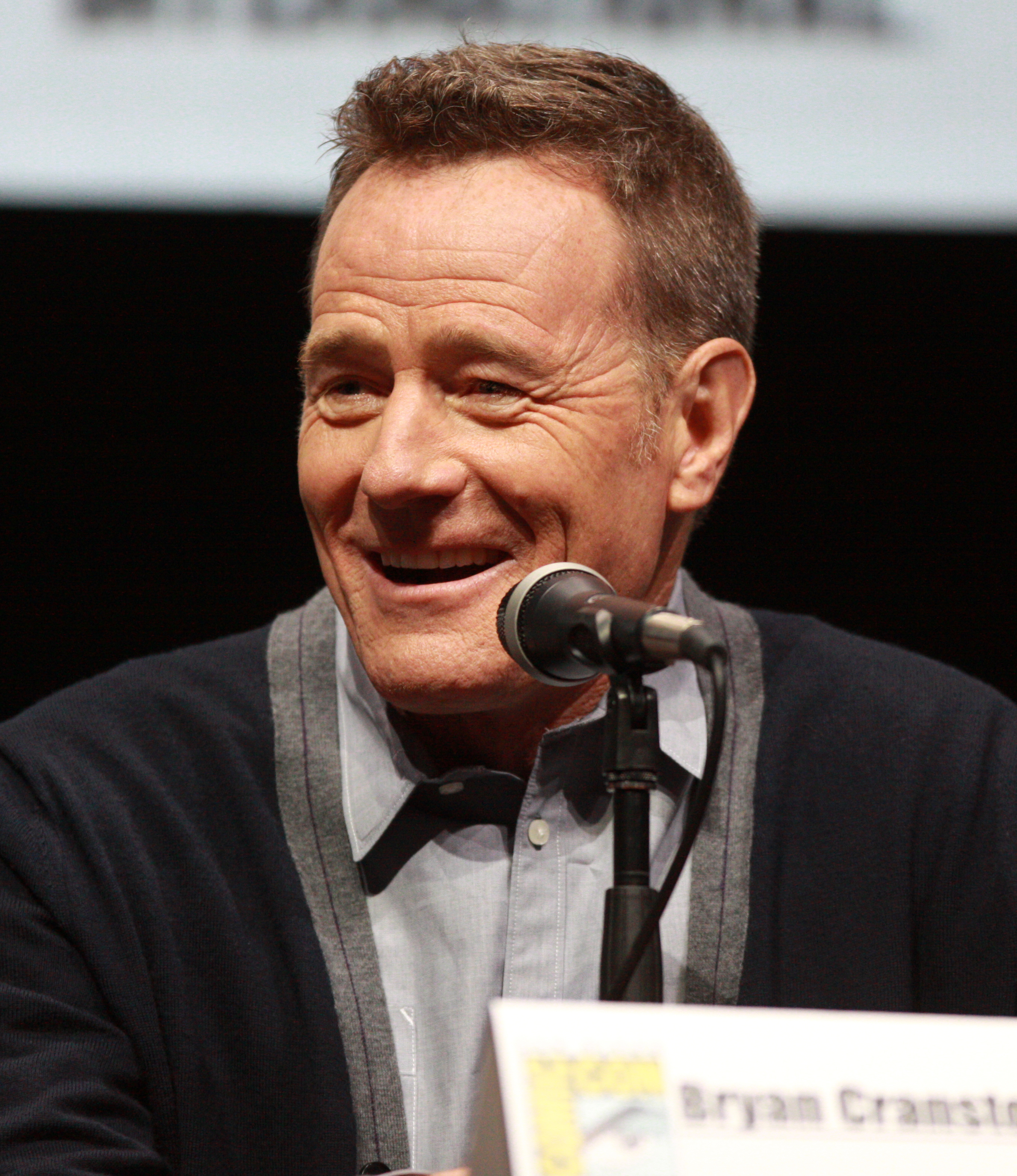
Bryan Cranston, Best Actor in a Drama Series winner

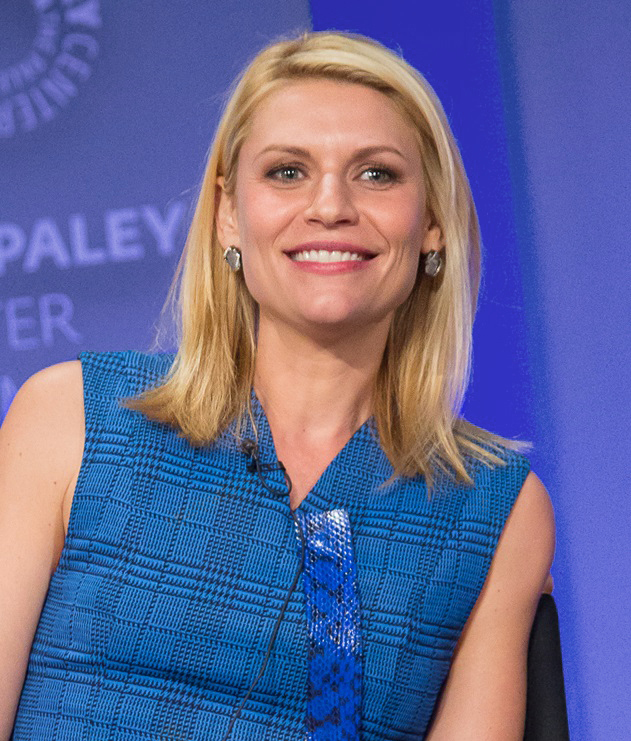
Claire Danes, Best Actress in a Drama Series winner

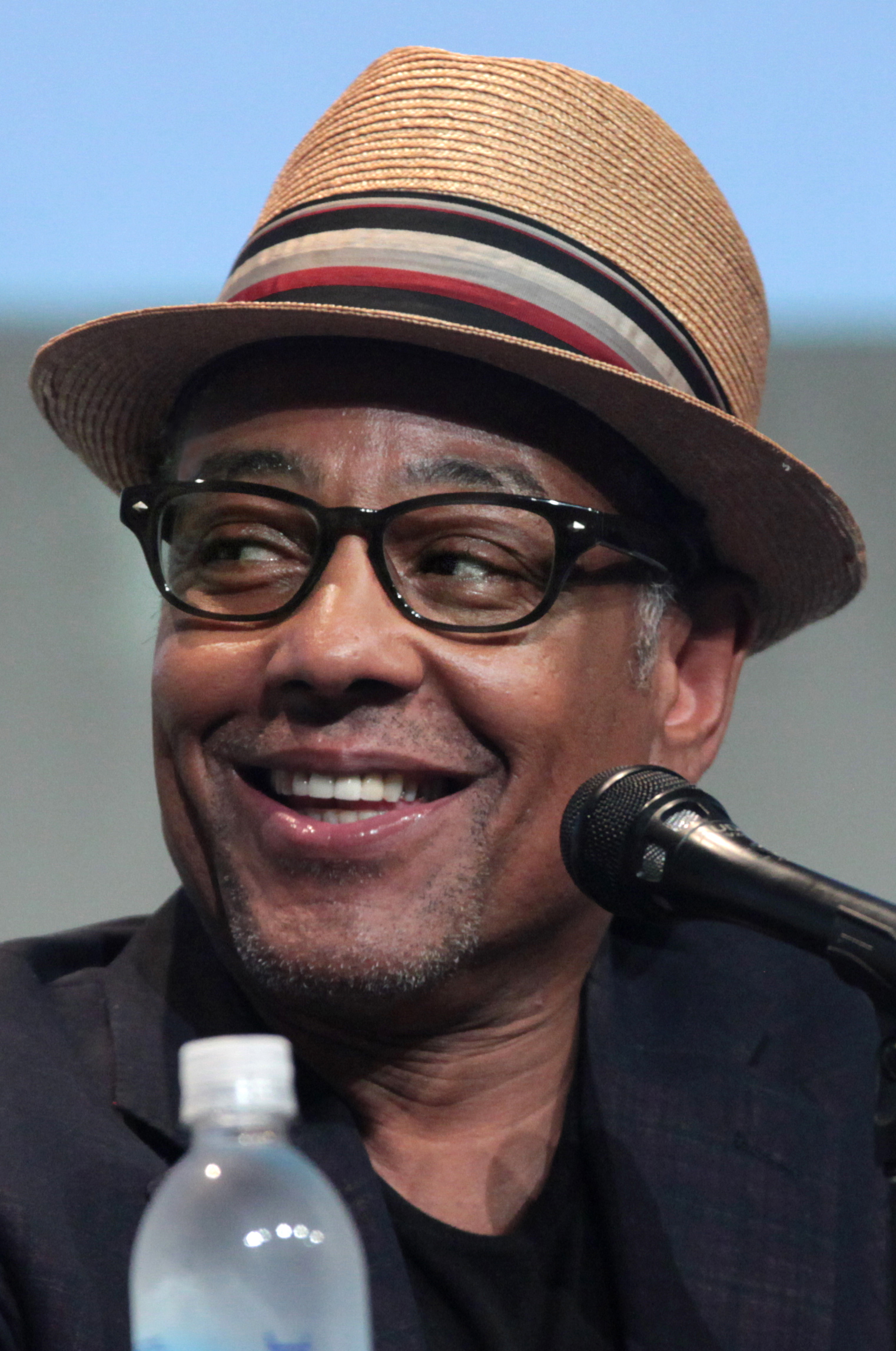
Giancarlo Esposito, Best Supporting Actor in a Drama Series winner

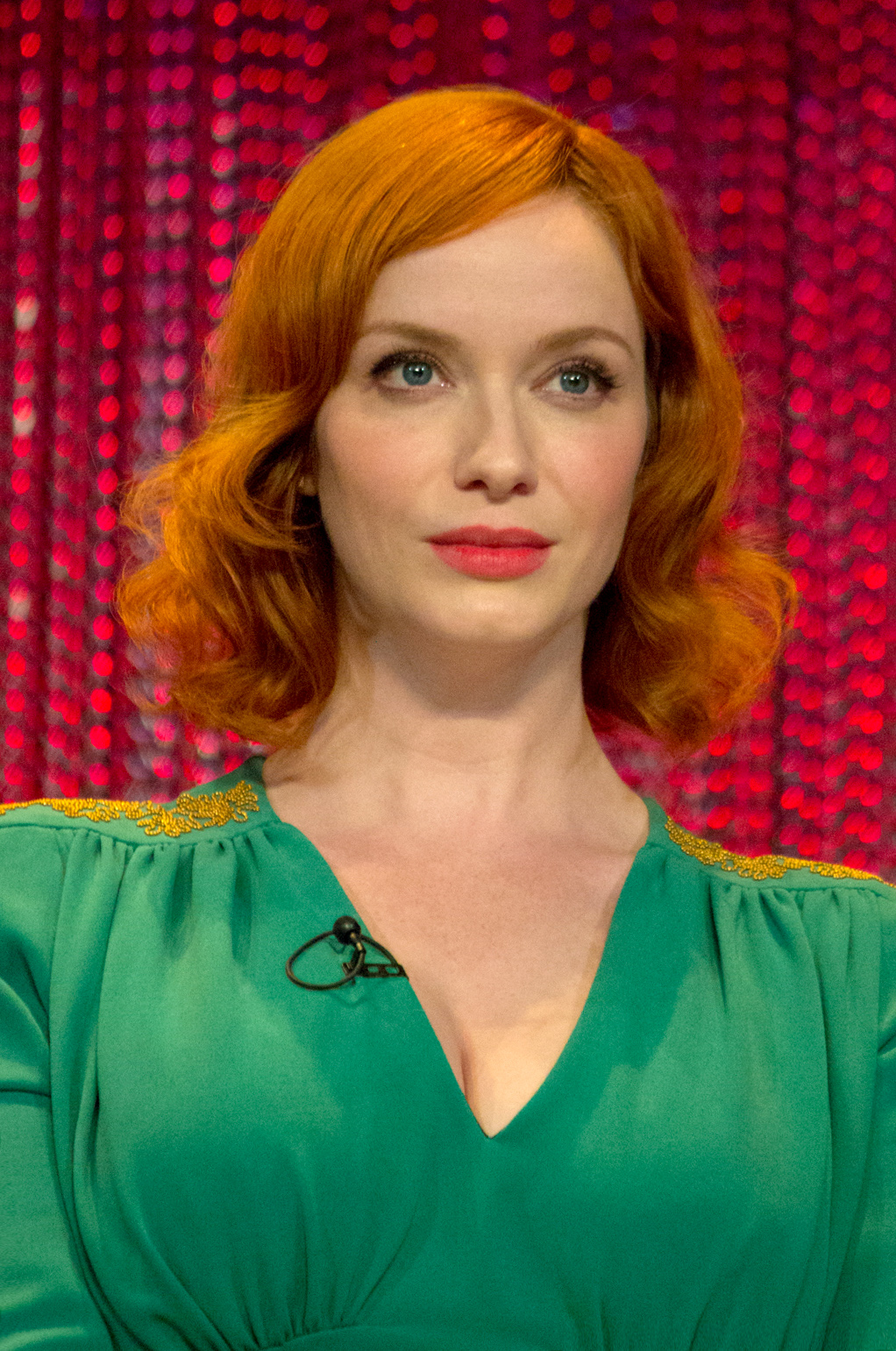
Christina Hendricks, Best Supporting Actress in a Drama Series winner

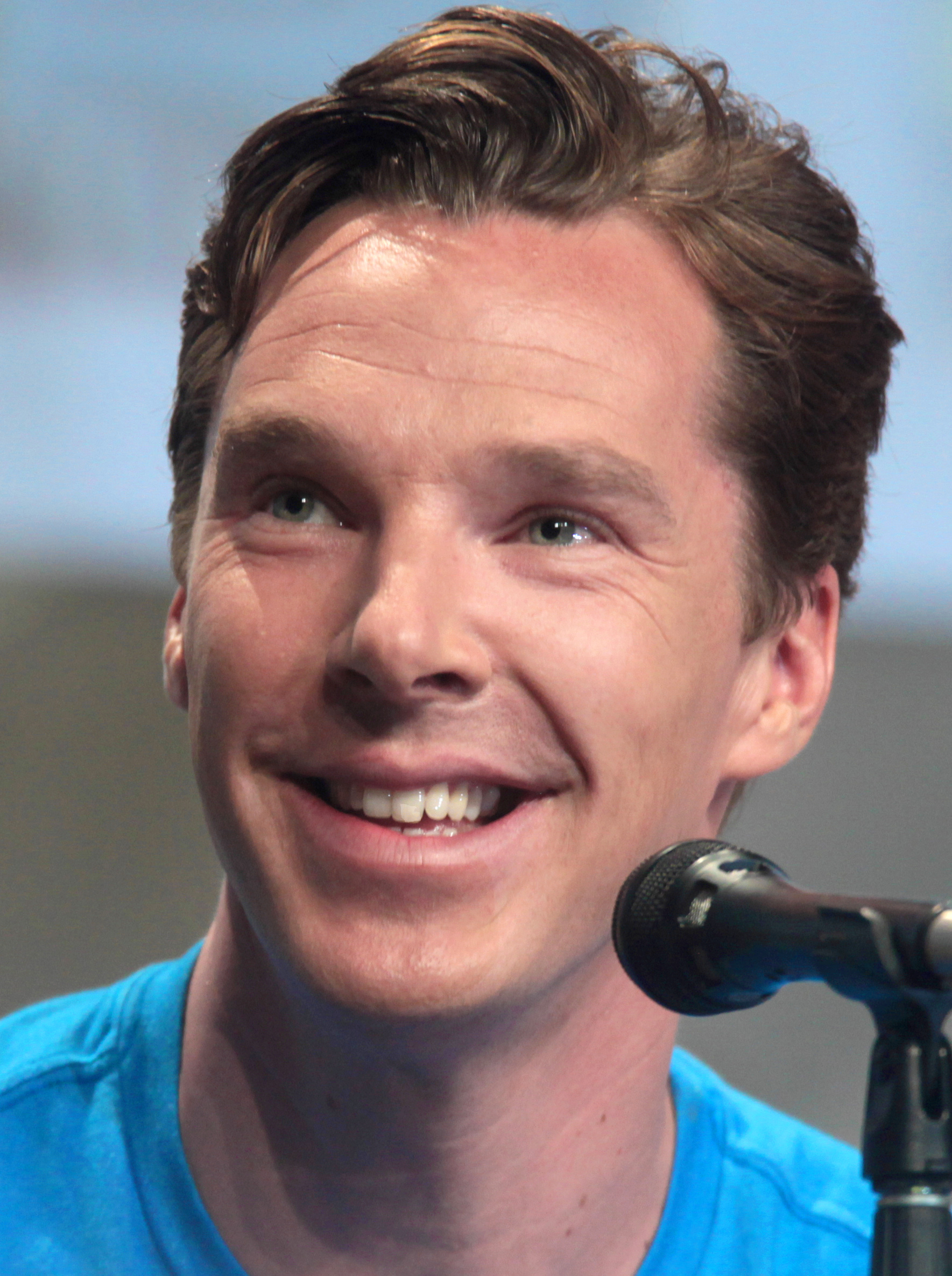
Benedict Cumberbatch, Best Actor in a Movie/Miniseries winner

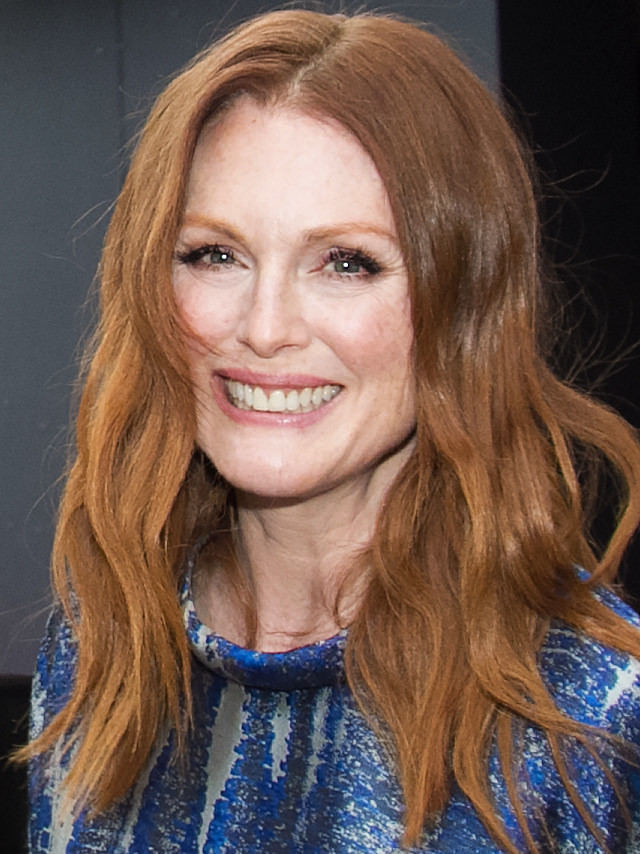
Julianne Moore, Best Actress in a Movie/Miniseries winner

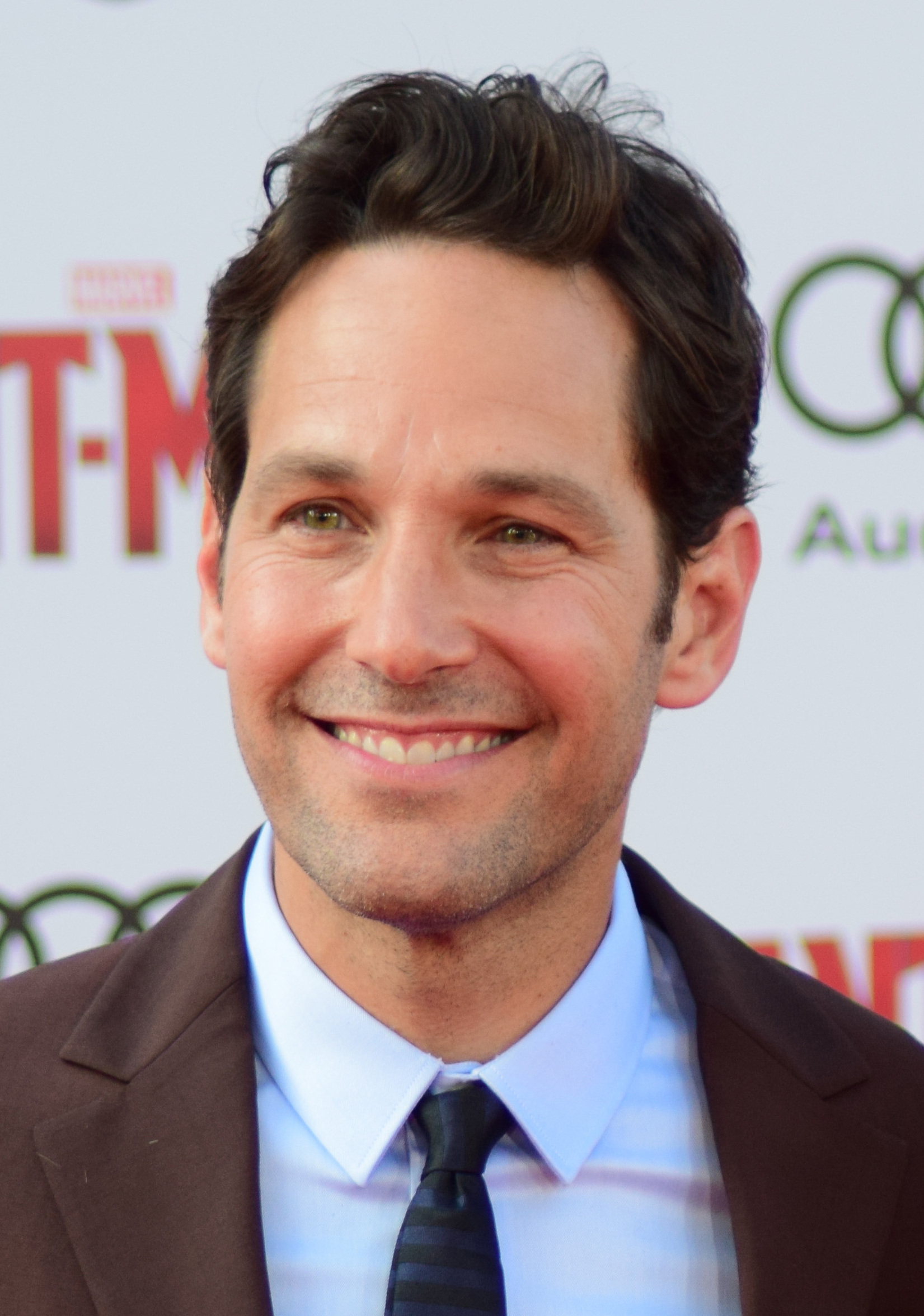
Paul Rudd, Best Guest Performer in a Comedy Series winner

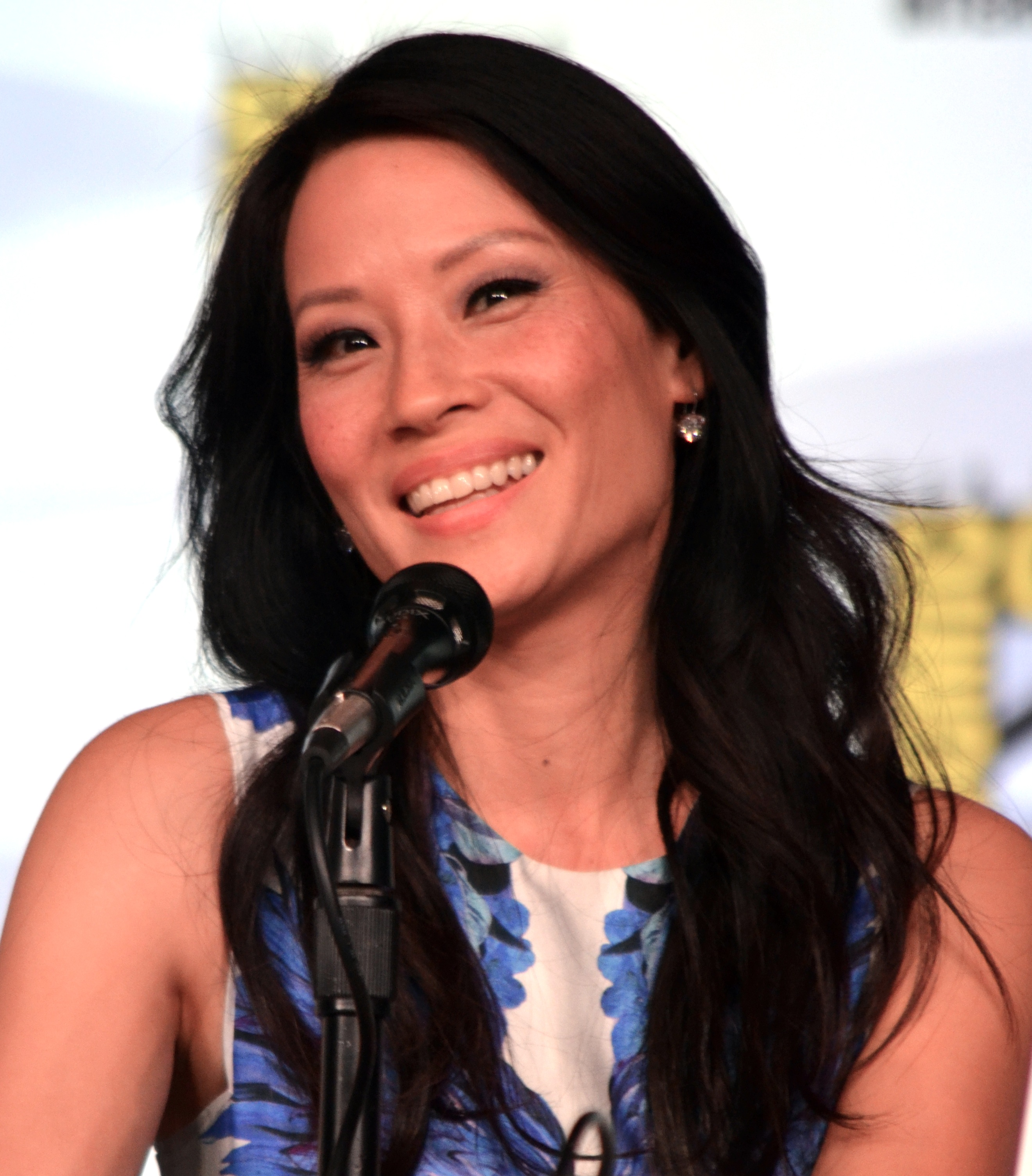
Lucy Liu, Best Guest Performer in a Drama Series winner

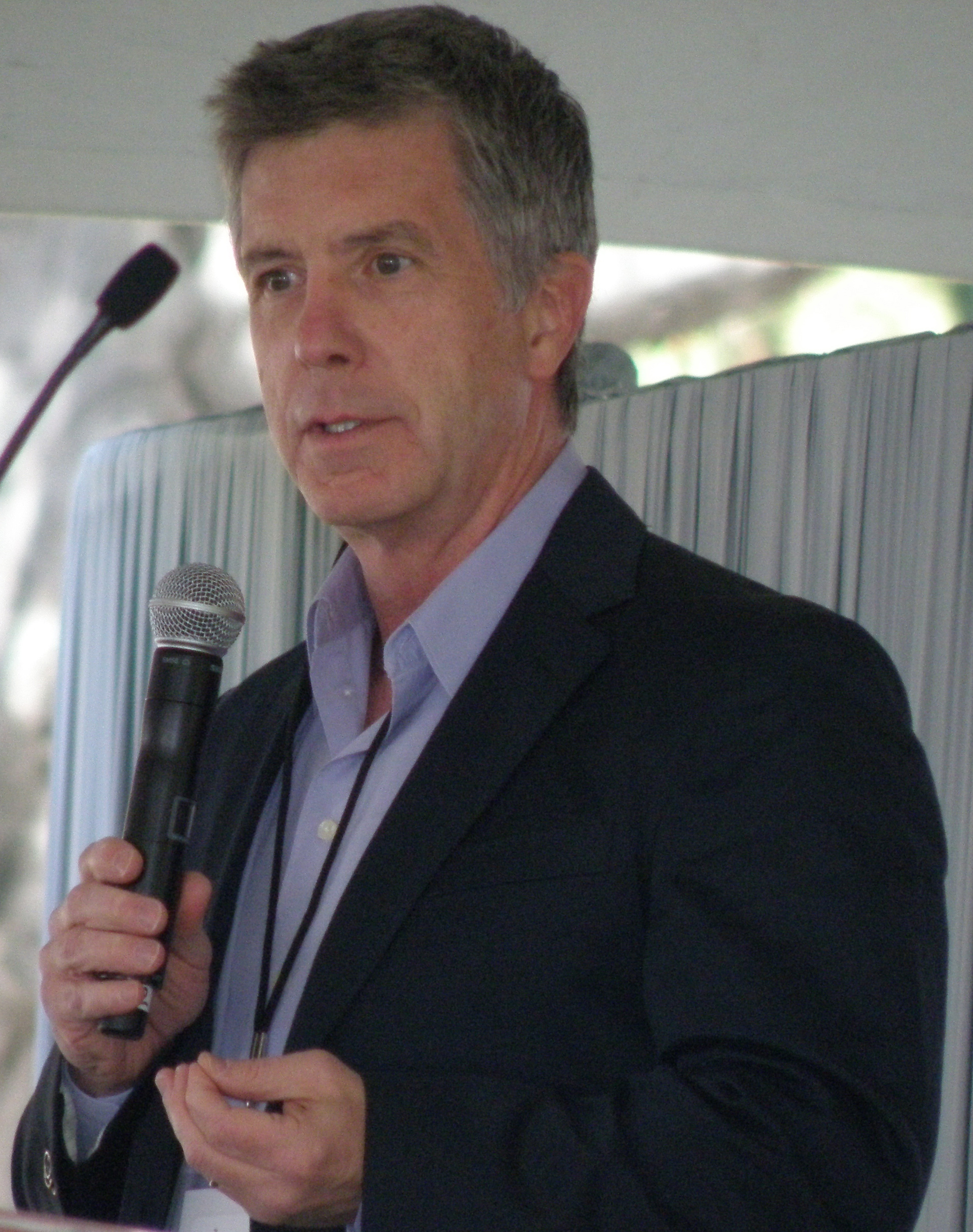
Tom Bergeron, Best Reality Show Host co-winner

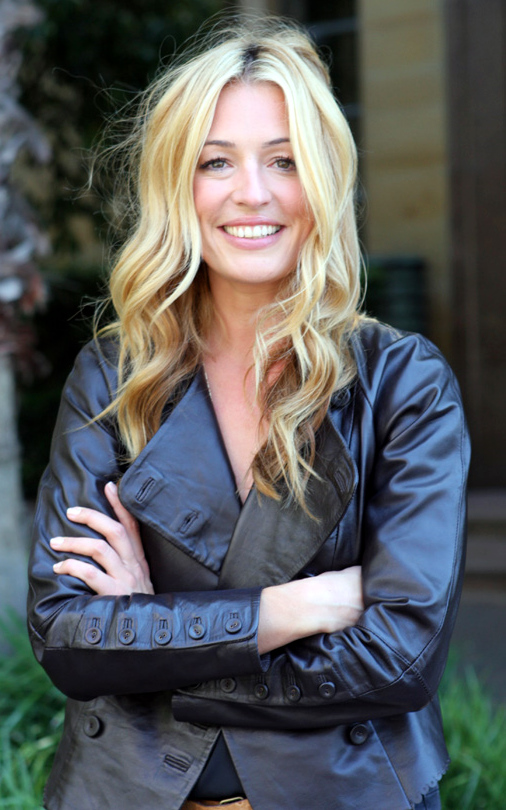
Cat Deeley, Best Reality Show Host co-winner

Best Series
Best Comedy Series	Best Drama Series
**Community (NBC)**: The Big Bang Theory (CBS); Girls (HBO); Modern Family (ABC); New Girl (Fox); Parks and Recreation (NBC)	**Homeland (Showtime)**: Breaking Bad (AMC); Downton Abbey (PBS); Game of Thrones (HBO); The Good Wife (CBS); Mad Men (AMC)
Best Movie/Miniseries	Best Animated Series
**Sherlock (PBS)**: American Horror Story (FX); Game Change (HBO); The Hour (BBC America); Luther (BBC America); Page Eight (PBS)	**Archer (FX)**: Adventure Time (Cartoon Network); Bob's Burgers (Fox); Family Guy (Fox); Star Wars: The Clone Wars (Adult Swim / Cartoon Network)
Most Exciting New Series (All Honored)
The Following (Fox); The Mindy Project (Fox); Nashville (ABC); The Newsroom (HBO); Political Animals (USA)
Best Acting in a Comedy Series
Best Actor	Best Actress
**Louis C.K. as Louie – Louie**: Don Cheadle as Marty Kaan – House of Lies; Larry David as Himself – Curb Your Enthusiasm; Garret Dillahunt as Burt Chance – Raising Hope; Joel McHale as Jeff Winger – Community; Jim Parsons as Dr. Sheldon Cooper – The Big Bang Theory	**Zooey Deschanel as Jessica Day – New Girl (TIE)**; **Amy Poehler as Leslie Knope – Parks and Recreation (TIE)**: Lena Dunham as Hannah Horvath – Girls; Julia Louis-Dreyfus as Selina Meyer – Veep; Martha Plimpton as Virginia Chance – Raising Hope; Ashley Rickards as Jenna Hamilton – Awkward
Best Supporting Actor	Best Supporting Actress
**Ty Burrell as Phil Dunphy – Modern Family**: Max Greenfield as Schmidt – New Girl; Nick Offerman as Ron Swanson – Parks and Recreation; Danny Pudi as Abed Nadir – Community; Jim Rash as Craig Pelton – Community; Damon Wayans Jr. as Brad Williams – Happy Endings	**Julie Bowen as Claire Dunphy – Modern Family**: Alison Brie as Annie Edison – Community; Cheryl Hines as Dallas Royce – Suburgatory; Gillian Jacobs as Britta Perry – Community; Eden Sher as Sue Heck – The Middle; Casey Wilson as Penny Hartz – Happy Endings
Best Acting in a Drama Series
Best Actor	Best Actress
**Bryan Cranston as Walter White – Breaking Bad**: Kelsey Grammer as Tom Kane – Boss; Jon Hamm as Don Draper – Mad Men; Charlie Hunnam as Jax Teller – Sons of Anarchy; Damian Lewis as Nicholas Brody – Homeland; Timothy Olyphant as Raylan Givens – Justified	**Claire Danes as Carrie Mathison – Homeland**: Michelle Dockery as Lady Mary Crawley – Downton Abbey; Julianna Margulies as Alicia Florrick – The Good Wife; Elisabeth Moss as Peggy Olson – Mad Men; Emmy Rossum as Fiona Gallagher – Shameless; Katey Sagal as Gemma Teller Morrow – Sons of Anarchy
Best Supporting Actor	Best Supporting Actress
**Giancarlo Esposito as Gus Fring – Breaking Bad**: Peter Dinklage as Tyrion Lannister – Game of Thrones; Neal McDonough as Robert Quarles – Justified; John Noble as Dr. Walter Bishop – Fringe; Aaron Paul as Jesse Pinkman – Breaking Bad; John Slattery as Roger Sterling, Jr. – Mad Men	**Christina Hendricks as Joan Harris – Mad Men**: Christine Baranski as Diane Lockhart – The Good Wife; Anna Gunn as Skyler White – Breaking Bad; Regina King as Det. Lydia Adams – Southland; Kelly Macdonald as Margaret Schroeder – Boardwalk Empire; Maggie Siff as Dr. Tara Knowles – Sons of Anarchy
Best Acting in a Movie/Miniseries
Best Actor	Best Actress
**Benedict Cumberbatch as Sherlock Holmes – Sherlock**: Kevin Costner as Devil Anse Hatfield – Hatfields & McCoys; Idris Elba as Det. John Luther – Luther; Woody Harrelson as Steve Schmidt – Game Change; Bill Nighy as Johnny Worricker – Page Eight; Dominic West as Hector Madden – The Hour	**Julianne Moore as Sarah Palin – Game Change**: Gillian Anderson as Miss Havisham – Great Expectations; Patricia Clarkson as Mia Knowles – Five; Jessica Lange as Constance Langdon – American Horror Story; Lara Pulver as Irene Adler – Sherlock; Emily Watson as Janet Leach – Appropriate Adult
Best Guest Performing
Best Guest Performer – Comedy	Best Guest Performer – Drama
**Paul Rudd as Bobby Newport – Parks and Recreation**: Becky Ann Baker as Loreen Horvath – Girls; Bobby Cannavale as Lewis – Modern Family; Kathryn Hahn as Jennifer Barkley – Parks and Recreation; Justin Long as Paul Genzlinger – New Girl; Peter Scolari as Tad Horvath – Girls	**Lucy Liu as Officer Jessica Tang – Southland**: Dylan Baker as Jerry Boorman – Damages; Jere Burns as Wynn Duffy – Justified; Loretta Devine as Adele Webber – Grey's Anatomy; Carrie Preston as Elsbeth Tascioni – The Good Wife; Chloe Webb as Monica Gallagher – Shameless
Reality & Variety
Best Reality Series	Best Reality Series – Competition
**Anthony Bourdain: No Reservations (Travel Channel)**: Hoarders (A&E); Kitchen Nightmares (Fox); Pawn Stars (History); Sister Wives (TLC); Undercover Boss (CBS)	**The Voice (NBC)**: The Amazing Race (CBS); Chopped (Food Network); The Pitch (AMC); Shark Tank (ABC); So You Think You Can Dance (Fox)
Best Talk Show	Best Reality Show Host
**Late Night with Jimmy Fallon (NBC)**: Conan (TBS); The Daily Show with Jon Stewart (Comedy Central); Jimmy Kimmel Live! (ABC); The View (ABC)	**Tom Bergeron – Dancing with the Stars (TIE)**; **Cat Deeley – So You Think You Can Dance (TIE)**: Nick Cannon – America's Got Talent; Phil Keoghan – The Amazing Race; RuPaul – RuPaul's Drag Race

== Shows with multiple wins ==
The following shows received multiple awards:

Series	Network	Category	Wins
Breaking Bad	AMC	Drama	2
Homeland	Showtime	Drama	2
Modern Family	ABC	Comedy	2
Parks and Recreation	NBC	Comedy	2
Sherlock	PBS	Movie/Miniseries	2

== Shows with multiple nominations ==
The following shows received multiple nominations:

Program	Network	Category	Nominations
Community	NBC	Comedy	6
Breaking Bad	AMC	Drama	5
Mad Men	AMC	Drama	5
Parks and Recreation	NBC	Comedy	5
Girls	HBO	Comedy	4
The Good Wife	CBS	Drama	4
Modern Family	ABC	Comedy	4
New Girl	Fox	Comedy	4
Game Change	HBO	Movie/Miniseries	3
Homeland	Showtime	Drama	3
Justified	FX	Drama	3
Sherlock	PBS	Movie/Miniseries	3
Sons of Anarchy	FX	Drama	3
The Amazing Race	CBS	Reality – Competition	2
American Horror Story	FX	Movie/Miniseries	2
The Big Bang Theory	CBS	Comedy	2
Downton Abbey	PBS	Drama	2
Game of Thrones	HBO	Drama	2
Happy Endings	ABC	Comedy	2
The Hour	BBC America	Movie/Miniseries	2
Luther	BBC America	Movie/Miniseries	2
Page Eight	PBS	Movie/Miniseries	2
Raising Hope	Fox	Comedy	2
Shameless	Showtime	Drama	2
Southland	TNT	Drama	2
So You Think You Can Dance	Fox	Reality – Competition	2
