= Ready? OK! =

- DVD cover
- Directed by: James Vasquez
- Written by: James Vasquez
- Produced by: Sebastian Jobin; Mark Holmes
- Starring: Michael Emerson; Carrie Preston; Lurie Poston; John G. Preston; Kali Rocha; Tara Karsian; Sandra Ellis-Troy; Sam Pancake
- Cinematography: Elizabeth Santoro
- Edited by: James Vasquez
- Music by: Lance Horne
- Production company: Daisy 3 Pictures
- Distributed by: Wolfe Releasing
- Release date: April 17, 2008 (FilmOut San Diego)
- Running time: 93 minutes
- Country: United States
- Language: English

Ready? OK! is a 2008 comedy film written, edited, and directed by James Vasquez, and produced by Daisy 3 Pictures.

== Plot ==
Andrea Dowd (Carrie Preston) is a single parent struggling to raise her ten-year-old son, Joshua (Lurie Poston). Andrea is concerned about Joshua's interests. Instead of wanting to be on the school wrestling team, Joshua strives to be on the cheerleading squad. When students are told to come to school dressed as an influential role model, Joshua chooses Maria von Trapp. The film explores Andrea's internal battle of wanting her son to be "normal," and embracing his individuality and accepting him as he is.

== Cast ==
- Michael Emerson as Charlie New
- Carrie Preston as Andrea Dowd
- Lurie Poston as Joshua Alexander "Josh" Dowd
- John G. Preston as Alex Dowd
- Kali Rocha as Halle Hinton
- Tara Karsian as Sister Vivian
- Sandra Ellis-Troy as Emily Dowd
- Sam Pancake as Mabel
- Stephanie D'Abruzzo as Normal Heights vocalist

== Production ==
The film is loosely based on a short film of the same name. The short film is available on the DVD, First Out 3.

== Awards ==
- Best US Narrative Feature Film: 2008 FilmOut San Diego
- Best Actress (Carrie Preston): 2008 FilmOut San Diego
- Outstanding Emerging Talent (James Vasquez): 2008 FilmOut San Diego
- Best of NewFest - Encore Screening at Brooklyn Academy of Music: 2008 NewFest NYC
- Best Male Feature Film: 2008 North Carolina GLFF
- Best Narrative Feature Film (Jury Award): 2008 Seattle Lesbian & Gay Film Festival

== Release ==
- FilmOut San Diego - April 17, 2008
- Q Cinema Fort Worth Gay and Lesbian International Film Festival - June 1, 2008
- 2008 NewFest NYC - June 7, 2008
- Frameline Film Festival - June 24, 2008
- Cinequest Film Festival - March 6, 2009

Ready? OK! premiered on television on November 15, 2009, on the cable LGBT-related channel Logo.
