= Alabama Shakespeare Festival =

Theatre festival in Alabama

Coordinates: 32.349961°N 86.212968°W

- Formation: 1972
- Type: Theatre group
- Purpose: Shakespeare festival, Repertory theatre
- Website: asf.net
Carolyn Blount Theatre
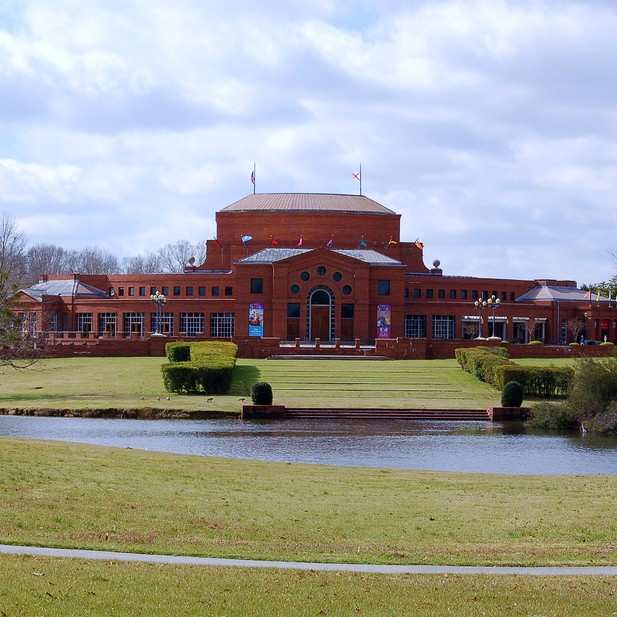
- The Carolyn Blount Theatre has been home to the Alabama Shakespeare Festival since 1985.
- Interactive map of Carolyn Blount Theatre
- Address: 1 Festival Drive; Montgomery, Alabama

The Alabama Shakespeare Festival (ASF) is among the ten largest Shakespeare festivals in the world. The festival is permanently housed in the Carolyn Blount Theatre in Montgomery, Alabama.

ASF puts on 6-9 productions annually, typically including three works of William Shakespeare. Other plays sample various genres and playwrights, classical and modern, sometimes with an emphasis on Southern works. ASF's Southern Writers Project nurtures the creation of new plays that reflect Southern themes. The festival stages more than 400 performances each year that attract more than 300,000 visitors from throughout the United States and more than 60 countries.

== History ==
The ASF began in 1972 as a summer-stock theater project in Anniston. Its first performance was in the Anniston High School auditorium, before a single critic and his wife; the critic considered the performance very poor and predicted that the ASF would not survive. But the project persisted, with a number of innovative performances - including Taming of the Shrew set in 1950s New York City. Eventually, the Shakespeare Festival grew to garner critical acclaim, but lacked the financial support to keep it afloat. In December 1985, the ASF moved to Montgomery, as the result of Mr. and Mrs. Winton Blount's $21.5-million gift of a performing-arts complex set in a 250-acre (1-km²) landscaped park, the Winton M. Blount Cultural Park. The Carolyn Blount Theatre houses the 792-seat Festival Stage and the 225-seat Octagon Theatre.

There was no 2020 season.

== Education ==
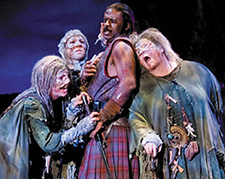
Production of The Tragedy of Macbeth during the 2004 season of the festival.

Until 2009, ASF operated a Professional Actor Training program leading to the M.F.A. degree in cooperation with the University of Alabama Department of Theatre and Dance. Tony Award–winning actor Norbert Leo Butz and Emmy Award–winning actor Michael Emerson were two of the program's most successful alumni. On April 25, 2008, ASF announced that its relationship with the University of Alabama would be phased out following the graduation of the last class in August 2009.

== See also ==
- Montgomery Museum of Fine Arts, also located in Montgomery's Blount Cultural Park.
