= Michael Emerson =

American actor (born 1954)

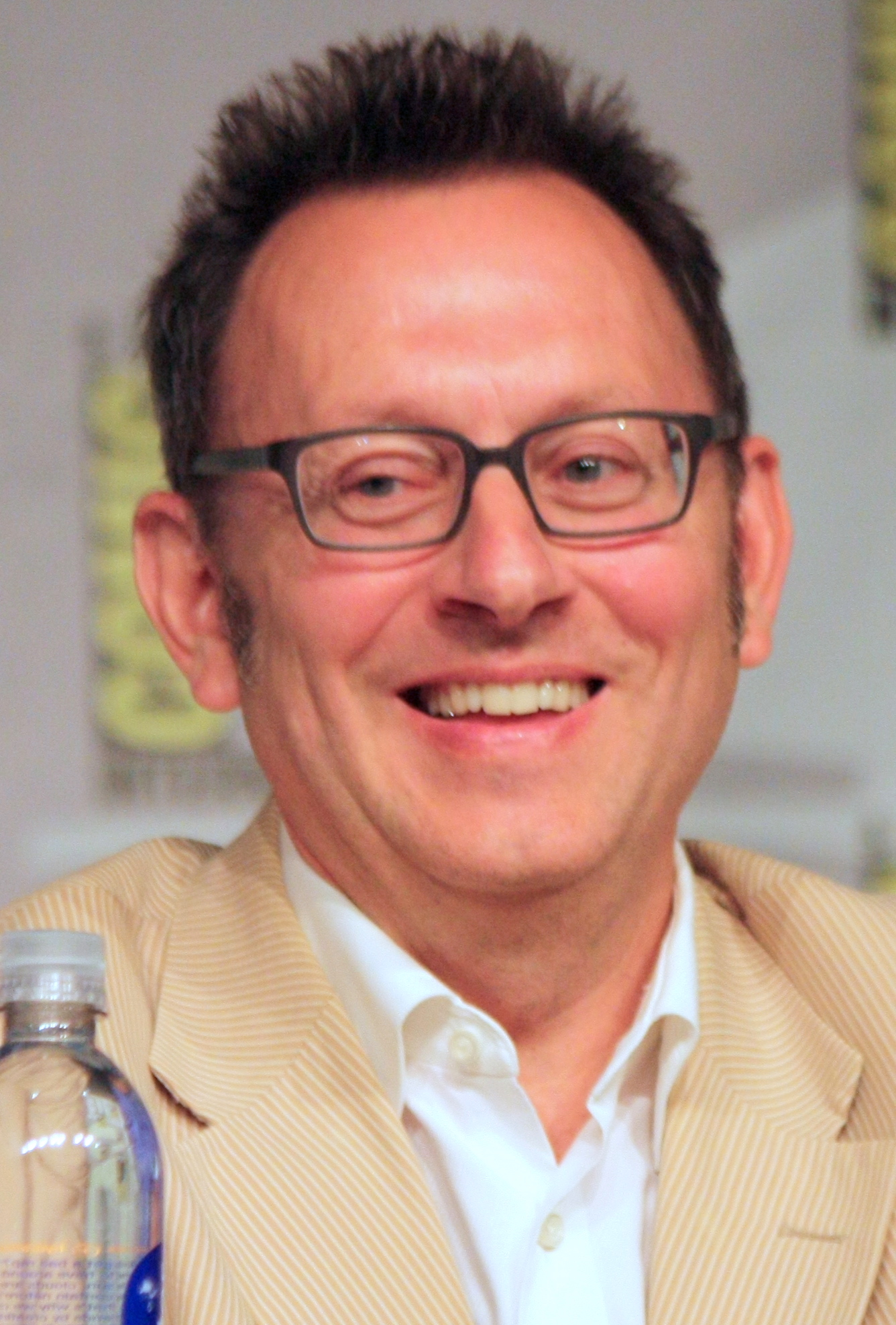
- Emerson at the 2013 San Diego Comic-Con
- Born: September 7, 1954 (age 72); Cedar Rapids, Iowa, U.S.
- Education: Drake University (BA); University of Alabama (MFA)
- Occupation: Actor
- Years active: 1986–present
- Spouse: Carrie Preston (m. 1998)

Michael Emerson (born September 7, 1954) is an American actor. He is best known for his roles as Benjamin Linus on Lost (2006–2010) and as Harold Finch in the CBS series Person of Interest (2011–2016). Other prominent roles include Zep Hindle in the horror film Saw (2004) and as Dr. Leland Townsend in the Paramount+ series Evil (2019–2024).

He has won two Primetime Emmy Awards, one Guest Actor in a Drama Series award for portraying William Hinks on The Practice (2000–2001), and the second a Supporting Actor in a Drama Series award for his role in Lost, for which he also received three other Primetime Emmy nominations. Emerson has also worked extensively in theatre, notably originating the role of Oscar Wilde in Gross Indecency: The Three Trials of Oscar Wilde from 1997 to 1998, portraying Willie Oban in the 1999 Broadway revival of The Iceman Cometh, and playing Guy in the debut production of Will Eno's Wakey, Wakey in 2017.

== Early life and education ==
Emerson was born in Cedar Rapids, Iowa, to Carol (née Hansen) and Ronald H. Emerson. He grew up in Toledo, Iowa, where he was a member of his high school marching band.

He graduated in 1976 from Drake University in Des Moines, Iowa, where he majored in theater and minored in art. He studied for a semester at the National Theater Institute at The Eugene O'Neill Theater Center, then moved to New York City. Unable to find acting work, he took retail jobs and worked as an illustrator.

In 1986, he moved to Jacksonville, Florida, where until 1993 he appeared in local productions at Theater Jacksonville and The Players by the Sea and worked as a director and teacher at Flagler College.

After several years of work including illustration and teaching, Emerson earned a Master of Fine Arts degree at the University of Alabama in the Alabama Shakespeare Festival acting program.

Emerson once directed a music video for Soul Guardians in 1989.

== Career ==
Emerson landed a starring role in 1997 as Oscar Wilde in Moises Kaufman's critically acclaimed off-Broadway play Gross Indecency: The Three Trials of Oscar Wilde, and then followed up with several other notable stage performances. In 1998, he performed opposite Uma Thurman in an off-Broadway production of Le Misanthrope. In 1999, he played Willie Oban in The Iceman Cometh. He co-starred with Kate Burton in both Give Me Your Answer, Do! and Hedda Gabler.

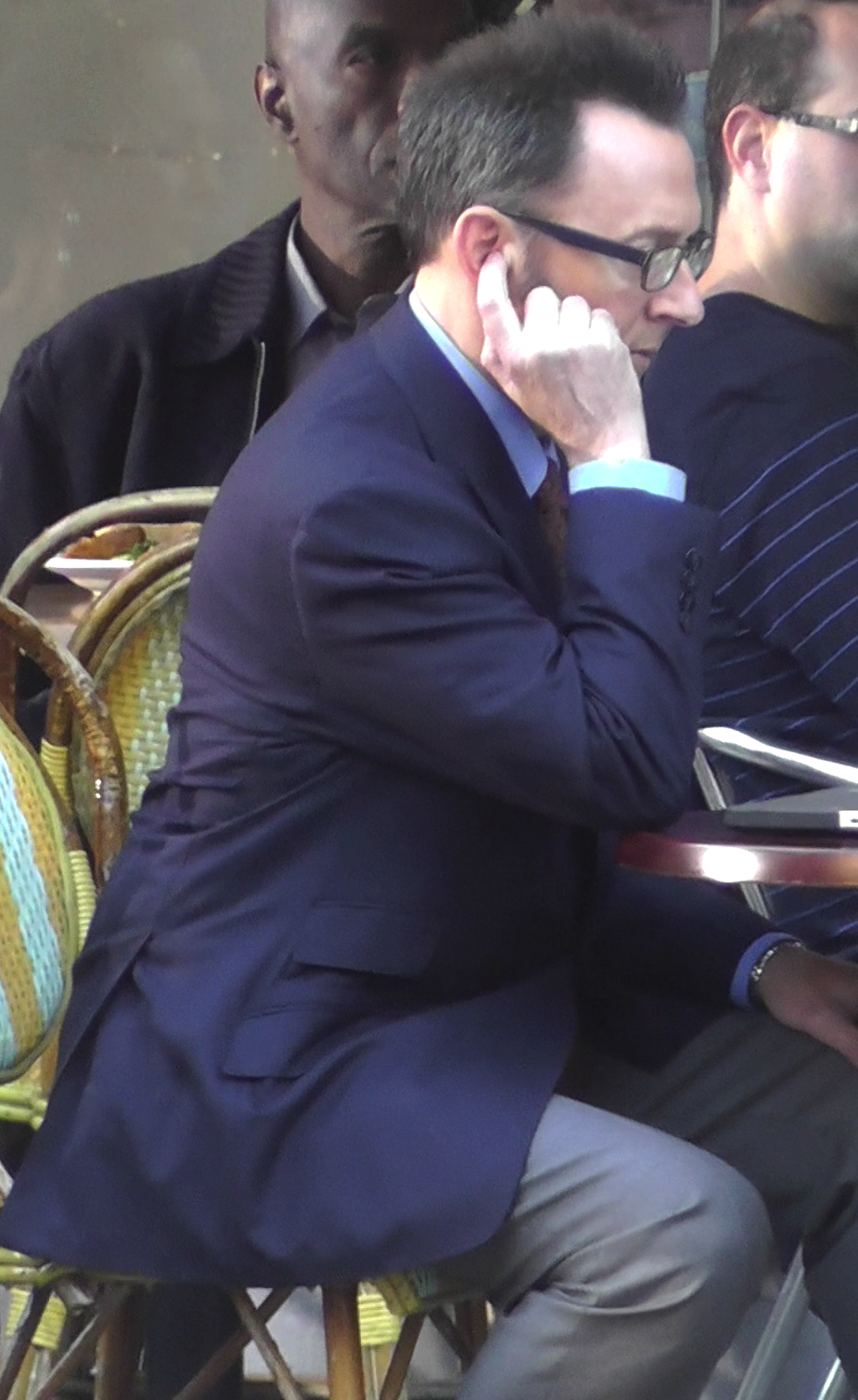
Michael Emerson filming Person of Interest in New York City

In September 2001, Emerson won an Emmy Award as Outstanding Guest Actor in a Drama Series for playing serial killer William Hinks in several episodes of The Practice. In 2006, Emerson began a guest star role as Benjamin Linus on the serial drama television series Lost. Emerson was originally set to appear in a small number of episodes, but returned for Season 3 as a main cast member and eventually became a leading character. He received an Emmy Award nomination in the Outstanding Supporting Actor category in 2007 and 2008 for his work in the third and fourth seasons. He won the award in 2009 after being nominated for his role in the fifth season.

Emerson was nominated in 2009 for a Golden Globe Award in the Best Performance by an Actor in a Supporting Role category. He was nominated for an Emmy for each season in which he was listed in the main cast.

On July 31, 2010, Emerson and Preston read A.R. Gurney's Love Letters, which was a 1990 finalist for the Pulitzer Prize for Drama, at the Charleston Stage as a fundraiser for the theater.

Emerson was set to reunite with former Lost cast member and friend Terry O'Quinn in a comedy-drama, tentatively titled Odd Jobs, by J. J. Abrams. It was expected to start filming by the end of 2010, but further development has been postponed. Emerson joined the cast of another Abrams series, Person of Interest, that debuted in September 2011 on CBS. He played a billionaire who teams up with a supposedly dead CIA agent to fight crime in New York City. His most recent role is in the Amazon Prime series Fallout.

== Personal life ==
Emerson married actress Carrie Preston in 1998 in her hometown of Macon, Georgia. They met while he was performing in a stage production of Hamlet in Alabama. It is his second marriage. The two later starred together in Straight-Jacket (2004). Preston portrayed Emily Linus (the mother of Emerson's character) on Lost in the flashback sequences of the episode "The Man Behind the Curtain". The two teamed up again, with Emerson portraying Preston's next-door neighbor, in the film Ready? OK! (2008). Preston also appeared in several episodes of Person of Interest as Grace Hendricks, the former fiancée of Harold Finch (Emerson). In 2024, Emerson had a recurring role as Judge Milton Crawford in Elsbeth, where Preston stars in the title role.

Emerson supports charities connected to the theater community, including the Actors Fund, Broadway Cares, and Off-Off Broadway, in addition to publicly supported radio stations and Habitat for Humanity.

== Filmography ==
=== Film ===
Year	Title	Role	Notes
1997	The Journey	Michael	
1998	The Impostors	Burtom's Assistant	
1998	Playing by Heart	Bosco	
1999	I'll Take You There	Tom	
1999	For Love of the Game	Gallery Doorman	
2001	Sounds from a Town I Love	Man	Short film
2002	The Laramie Project	Reverend	
2002	Unfaithful	Josh	
2004	Saw	Zep Hindle	
2004	Straight-Jacket	Victor	
2005	29th and Gay	Gorilla	
2005	The Legend of Zorro	Harrigan	
2006	Jumping Off Bridges	Frank Nelson	
2008	Ready? OK!	Charlie New	
2010	Goldstar, Ohio	Steve Harper	
2012	Batman: The Dark Knight Returns, Part 1	The Joker	Voice, direct-to-video
2013	Batman: The Dark Knight Returns, Part 2	The Joker	Voice, direct-to-video
2024	Man and Witch: The Dance of a Thousand Steps	Evil Wizard	

=== Television ===
Year	Title	Role	Notes
1990	Orpheus Descending	Clown	Television film
1998	Grace and Glorie	Arnold Dudley	Television film
1999	Stark Raving Mad	Mr. Putnam	Episode: "The Psychic"
2000	The District	Man in Bar	Episode: "Pilot"
2000–2001	The Practice	William Hinks	6 episodes Primetime Emmy Award for Outstanding Guest Actor in a Drama Series
2001	The Education of Max Bickford	Ted	Episode: "Herding Carts"
2002	Law & Order: Criminal Intent	Gerry Rankin	Episode: "Phantom"
2002	The X-Files	Oliver Martin	Episode: "Sunshine Days"
2003	Without a Trace	Stuart Wesmar	Episode: "Victory for Humanity"
2003	Skin	Harold Scarpelli	Episode: "Secrets & Lies"
2003	Whoopi	F. Thomas Erickson	Episode: "The Fat and the Frivolous"
2004	Law & Order: Special Victims Unit	Allan Shaye	Episode: "Ritual"
2005	The Inside	Marty Manning	Episode: "Pre-Filer"
2006–2010	Lost	Ben Linus	79 episodes Primetime Emmy Award for Outstanding Supporting Actor in a Drama Series; Saturn Award for Best Supporting Actor on Television; Nominated—Golden Globe Award for Best Supporting Actor – Series, Miniseries or Television Film; Nominated—Primetime Emmy Award for Outstanding Supporting Actor in a Drama Series (2007–2008, 2010); Nominated—Satellite Award for Best Supporting Actor – Series, Miniseries or Television Film (2006–2007); Nominated—Saturn Award for Best Supporting Actor on Television (2007, 2009–2011); Nominated—Teen Choice Award for Choice TV Villain
2007	Lost: Missing Pieces	Ben Linus	2 episodes
2010	Front Line	John Winthrop	Episode: "God In America"
2011	Parenthood	Andy Fitzgerald	Episode: "Amazing Andy and His Wonderful World of Bugs"
2011	G.I. Joe: Renegades	Doctor Venom	Voice, episode: "The Anaconda Strain"
2011	Generator Rex	Alpha Nanite	Voice, episode: "Ben 10/Generator Rex: Heroes United"
2011–2016	Person of Interest	Harold Finch	103 episodes
2014	The Mystery of Matter	Narrator	Voice, 3 episodes
2017–2018	Arrow	Cayden James	7 episodes
2017	Claws	Ted	Episode: "Ambrosia"
2018	Mozart in the Jungle	Morton Norton	2 episodes
2019	The Name of the Rose	The Abbot	8 episodes
2019–2024	Evil	Leland Townsend	44 episodes Nominated—Critics' Choice Super Award for Best Actor in a Horror Series; Nominated—Saturn Award for Best Supporting Actor on Television; Nominated—Critics' Choice Television Award for Best Supporting Actor in a Drama Series (2024–2025)
2023–present	My Adventures with Superman	Brainiac	Voice, 7 episodes
2024–2026	Fallout	Siggi Wilzig	Episodes: "The Target" and "The Other Player"
2024–2025	Elsbeth	Judge Milton Crawford	5 episodes

=== Video games ===
Year	Title	Voice role
2008	Lost: Via Domus	Ben Linus
2020	Crucible	Brother

=== Theater ===
- Othello (as Iago), University of North Florida, 1986
- Noises Off (as Garry), Theater Jacksonville, 1986 or 1987
- Much Ado About Nothing (as Benedick), Players-By-The-Sea Theater, Jacksonville Beach, Florida, 1986 or 1987
- Hamlet (as Hamlet), University of North Florida Theater, Jacksonville, Florida, 1987
- Hamlet (as Hamlet), Players-By-The-Sea Theater, Jacksonville Beach, Florida
- The Importance of Being Earnest, Arkansas Repertory Theatre, 1990
- Parts Unknown, Players-By-The-Sea Theater, Jacksonville Beach, Florida, 1993
- The Tempest (as Ferdinand), Alabama Shakespeare Festival, 1994 or 1995
- The Way of the World (as Lady Wishfort), Alabama Shakespeare Festival, 1994 or 1995
- Hamlet (as Rosencrantz), Alabama Shakespeare Festival, 1994 or 1995
- All's Well That Ends Well, Alabama Shakespeare Festival, 1994 or 1995
- Henry IV, Part 1, Alabama Shakespeare Festival, 1994 or 1995
- A Christmas Carol, Alabama Shakespeare Festival, 1994 or 1995
- The Crucible, Alabama Shakespeare Festival, 1994 or 1995
- Androcles and the Lion, Alabama Shakespeare Festival, 1995 or 1996
- Gross Indecency: The Three Trials of Oscar Wilde (as Oscar Wilde), Minetta Lane Theatre, off-Broadway, 1997–1998
- The Iceman Cometh (as Willie Oban), Brooks Atkinson Theatre, 1999
- Give Me Your Answer, Do! (as David Knight), Gramercy Theatre, off-Broadway, 1999–2000
- Hedda Gabler (as George Tesman), Williamstown Theatre Festival, Main Stage, 2000
- Hedda Gabler (as George Tesman), Ambassador Theatre, Broadway, 2001–2002
- Tartuffe (as Cleante), American Airlines Theatre, Broadway, 2003
- Measure for Measure (as Duke Vincentio), California Shakespeare Theater, Orinda, California, 2003
- Someone Who'll Watch Over Me, The Ridgefield Playhouse for Movies and the Performing Arts, 2004
- Hamlet (as Ghost, Claudius, Osric, and Guildenstern), McCarter Theatre Center, Princeton, New Jersey, 2005
- Bach at Leipzig (as Schott), New York Theatre Workshop, 2005
- Likeness, Primary Stages Theater (307 W. 38th Street), 2008
- Every Good Boy Deserves Favour (as Alexander), Chautauqua Theater Company, 2008
- Love Letters (as Andrew Makepeace Ladd, III), Charleston Stage, 2010
- Wakey, Wakey (play by Will Eno) Signature Theatre (as Guy), 2017

== Other work ==
- In 2000, played the unnamed narrator character in the radio play adaptation of the Neil Gaiman short story, Murder Mysteries.
- In 2003, participated in a staged reading of a play involving string theory written by Jacquelyn Reingold called String Fever at Rockefeller University.
- In 2003, was the voice of George Washington in Favorite Son, an experimental documentary film about the relationship between George Washington and Alexander Hamilton.
- In 2005, narrated audio book CD of Robert Penn Warren's novel All the King's Men.
- In 2006, narrated audio book CD of The Amalgamation Polka by Stephen Wright, published.
- In 2007, with other Lost cast members, he participated in a play-reading session at the Tenney Theatre in Hawaii to raise money for the Honolulu Theatre for Youth.
- In 2009, narrated a reading of "Babar the Elephant" with the Honolulu Symphony Orchestra.
- Co-narrated with Peter J. Fernandez, the audio book version of James Patterson's novel, Four Blind Mice.
- Co-narrated with John Rubinstein the audio book of the novel Private Sector by Brian Haig.
- In 2010, narrated the Lemony Snicket audiobook 13 Words by Maria Kalman.
