= Feet of Clay (2007 film) =

- Directed by: Carrie Preston
- Written by: David Caudle
- Produced by: Mark Holmes
- Starring: John G. Preston; Steven McElroy; Liz Morton; Nina Jacques
- Cinematography: Mark Holmes
- Edited by: James Vasquez
- Music by: Frank Williams
- Release date: 2007
- Country: United States
- Language: English

Feet of Clay is a 2007 short film directed by Carrie Preston and produced by Daisy 3 Pictures.

Feet of Clay was written by David Caudle, and was first produced in 2005 as a play for the Samuel French Festival at the Chernuchin Theatre in New York City.

== Premise ==
Vaughn (Steven McElroy), a heterosexual man, confesses his sexual obsession for the feet of his best friend, Clay (John G. Preston).
