= Grace and Glorie =

- Hallmark Hall of Fame episode
- Directed by: Arthur Allan Seidelman
- Written by: Grace McKeaney
- Original air date: December 13, 1998

"Grace and Glorie" is an American television play that was broadcast on December 13, 1998, as part of the Hallmark Hall of Fame series on CBS. The cast included Gena Rowlands and Diane Lane. The production was shot on location in Southington, Connecticut, and directed by Arthur Allan Seidelman. The screenplay was written by Grace McKeaney based on a stage play by Tom Ziegler.

== Plot ==
The plot of Grace and Glorie revolves around a couple who move from New York City to a rural location where the couple become acquainted with an elderly, illiterate woman named Grace Stiles (Gena Rowlands).
