= Cross-gender acting =

Actors portraying characters of the opposite sex

Cross-gender acting is acting of the opposite gender. It is distinct from both transgender and cross-dressing roles.

Cross-gender acting often interacts with complex cultural ideas about gender. It has a diverse history across many cultures, including English Renaissance theatre, French theatre, Japanese theatre, Indian theatres, and Ethiopian theatre. In many contexts, such as English and Indian theatres, cross-gender acting was linked to the oppression of women. Many societies prohibited women from performing on stage, so boys and men took the female roles. Female impersonation often decreased in popularity as women gained this right.

Female cross-cast roles are commonly young boy characters, or, in the case of theatre companies like the Takarazuka Revue Company, male heroes. Some cultures, like Tang and Yuan dynasty China, had traditions of cross-gender acting for both men and women concurrently. Modern American cross-gender acting, especially in musical theatre roles where men play women, is often employed for comedic effect.

== Traditions of cross-gender acting before the 19th century ==
=== Ancient Greece ===
During the early development of ancient Greek theatre in the sixth century BC, both Athenian women and men performed. By the fifth century, changing Athenian cultural codes excluded women from public life, and thus the theatre. After this point, men played both male and female roles.

=== English Renaissance theatre ===
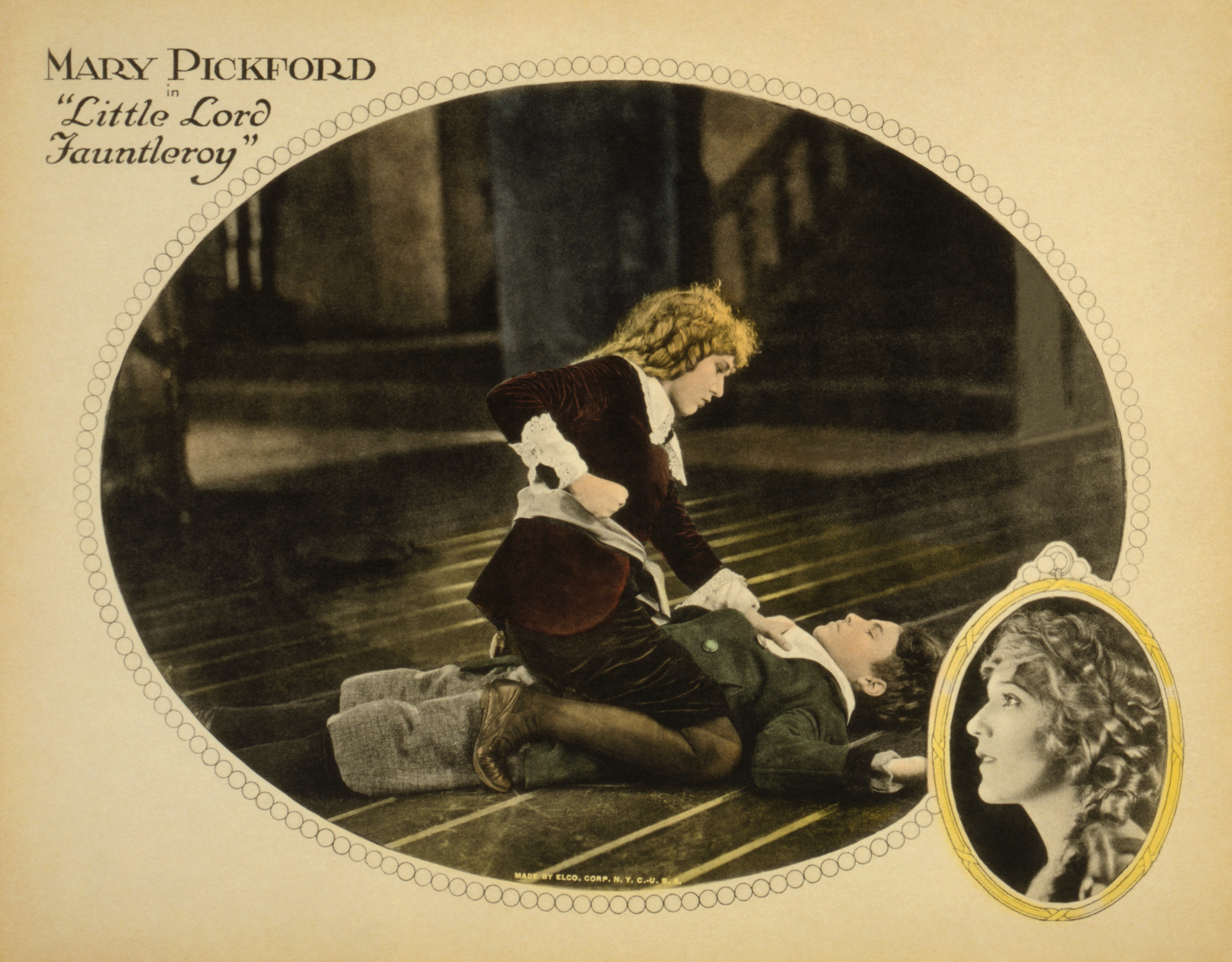
Mary Pickford as Cedric Errol in a lobby card for the 1921 film Little Lord Fauntleroy

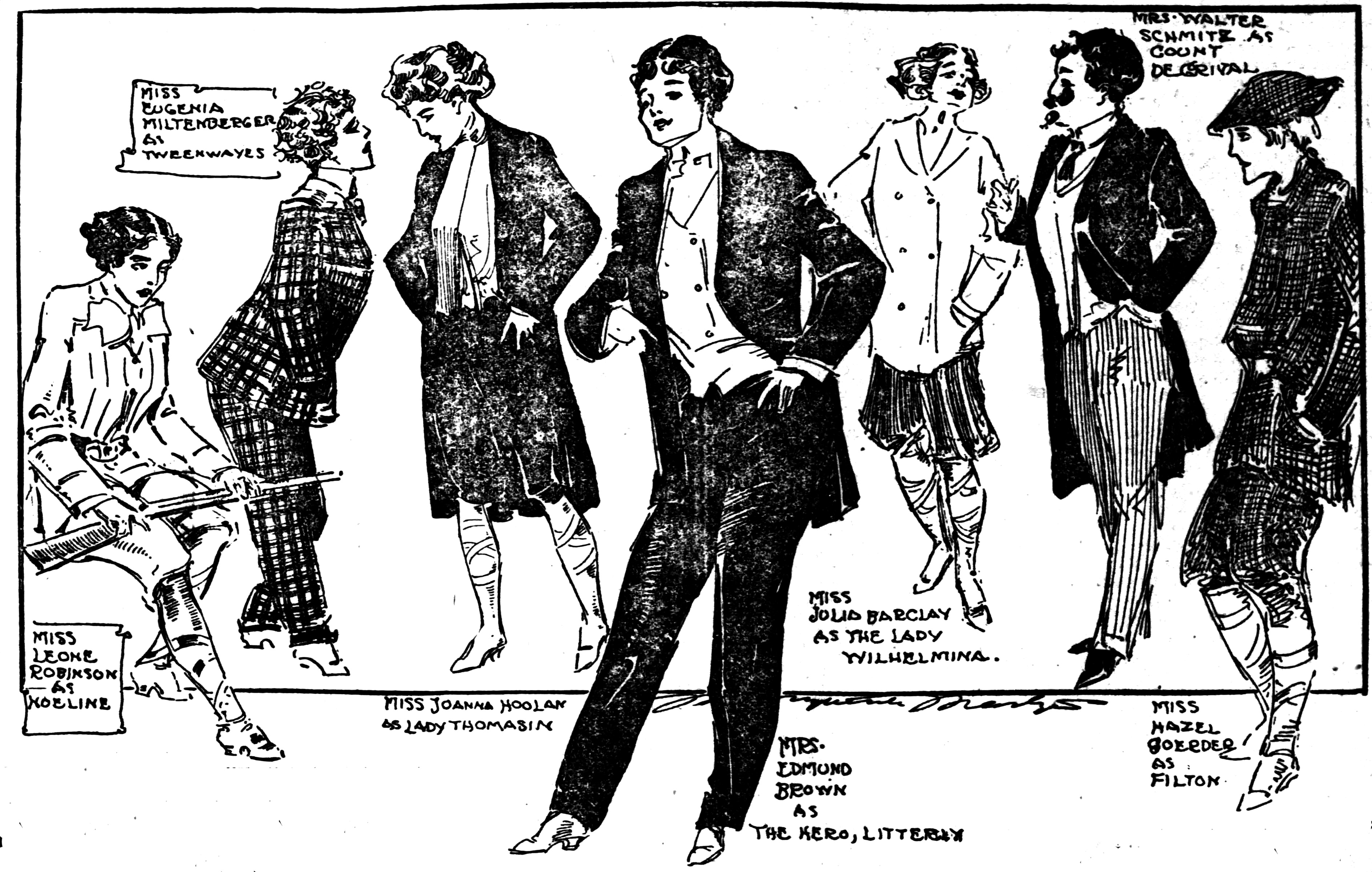
In this sketch by Marguerite Martyn, the College Club of St. Louis was in rehearsal for The Amazons, a play by Arthur Wing Pinero, in which all the parts were played by women, April 1910.

In Renaissance England, women were forbidden from performing on stage, so female roles in the plays of William Shakespeare and his contemporary playwrights were originally played by cross-dressing men or boys. (See also Stage Beauty.) Therefore, the original productions of the above-mentioned Shakespeare plays actually involved double-cross-dressing: male actors playing female characters disguising themselves as males. Academic research into the contemporary attitudes towards the practise have yielded a variety of interpretations. Historian Laura Levine argues that "an all-male acting troupe was the natural and unremarkable product of a culture whose conception of gender was "teleologically male".

==== Gender distinction and cross-gender acting ====
Cross-gender acting, while not specifically making a statement about crossdressing, helped produce negative judgements and statements about those who did cross-dress in the Renaissance era. In order to maintain a hierarchy and a gendered division of labour, a prominent feature of the Renaissance era, women and men needed to be distinct. Cross-gender acting disrupted gender distinction. Male-to-female cross-gender actors were either viewed as shameful, or they gained wealth and social status when playing women who married well-off men. In instances where boys acted as women, it was because they were seen as objects of desire, much like women, and they were also in a subordinate position in the hierarchy scale.

Some instances of female-to-male cross-dressing in theatre allowed women to challenge patriarchal notions of gender and explore both masculinity and femininity within this hierarchy. In The Roaring Girl, the protagonist, Moll, cross-dresses for liberty rather than safety, and thus exists in both male and female spaces.

==== Desire, homosexuality, and the malleability of gender for Renaissance MTF and boy actors ====
In order to believably portray women onstage, male actors needed the audience to believe that the characters were truly female, meaning MTF actors needed the audience to desire them. Once male actors stepped into the roles of women, it was feared that they would adopt transgressive feminine traits, which led to the belief that crossdressing was an undisciplined act. While troubling to some, the idea of female impersonation proved that gender was malleable when it came to England in the Renaissance Era. Theatre was considered a more acceptable venue for crossdressing, chiefly because it confined the act to a distinct place.

When boy actors portrayed female characters, religious authorities feared that the boys would become the women they embodied in plays, and therefore would transform into objects of erotic thoughts for male spectators. This sense of desire would supposedly come from the boys' failed attempts to represent binary womanhood onstage. The female costume on a boy's body created a sense of confusion between knowledge and visibility; it was thought that this confusion forced male spectators to translate women's appearances to the bodies of boys.

Shakespeare has been criticized for inciting male spectator desire on boy-to-female characters in his plays such as As You Like It, where boys played highly sexualized female characters.

=== Chinese theatre ===
In Chinese opera specialized male actors who play female roles (dàn) are referred to as nándàn (男旦); the practice arose during the Qing dynasty due to imperial prohibitions against women performing on stage, considered detrimental to public morality.

Going back as far as the Tang dynasty, both men and women played roles of the opposite sex in theatre. For women in the Yuan dynasty, cross-gender acting was liberating, as playing men allowed to embark on scholarly pursuits typically restricted from women. Despite this partial liberty, female actors were treated like prostitutes. During the Qing dynasty, women were prohibited from performing at all due to imperial anxieties about female sexuality. This led to the development of female impersonation techniques such as cai ciao (false-foot skill), which simulated a woman's bound feet.

=== Japanese theatre ===
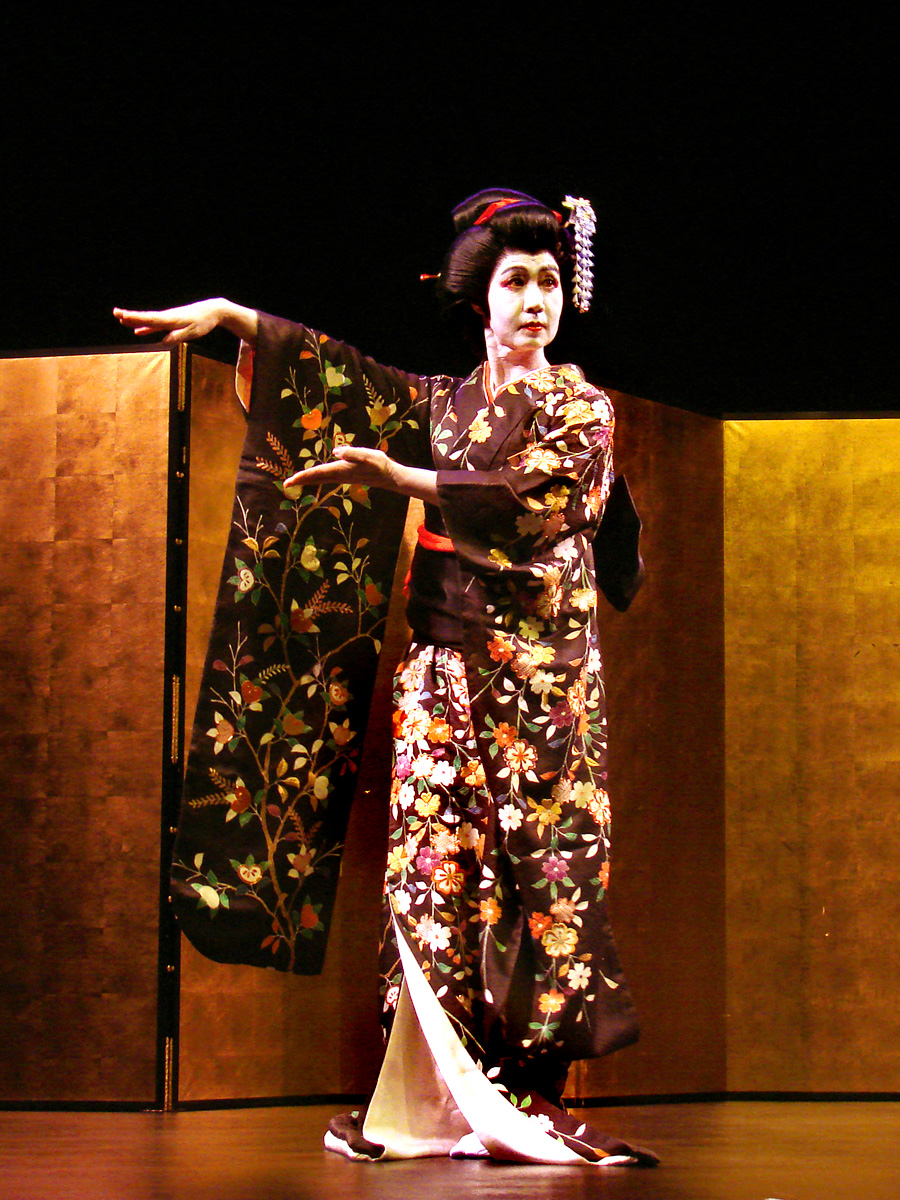
Kabuki actor in Japan

Japanese kabuki theatre began in the 17th century with all-female troupes performing both male and female roles. In 1629 the disrepute of kabuki performances (or of their audiences) led to the banning of women from the stage, but kabuki's great popularity inspired the formation of all-male troupes to carry on the theatrical genre. In kabuki, the portrayal of female characters by men is known as onnagata. The practice is detailed in a story of the same name by the Japanese writer, Yukio Mishima. All roles in Noh dramas are traditionally played by male actors; actors playing female roles wear feminine costumes and female-featured masks.

=== Spanish theatre ===
Cross-dressing in sixteenth- and seventeenth-century Spain was frequent among actors, and the theater was at the time the most popular form of entertainment. There was a fascination with female cross-dressers particularly (women dressed as men), who were "extremely popular" in the "Golden Age Comedia". Male actors might play the "women dressed as men" parts. Spain eventually found this cross-dressing to be threatening to social order, and passed laws targeting female transvestites throughout the 1600s. Despite the negative reactions and disapproval, it continued to remain very popular in the comedia.

=== French theatre ===
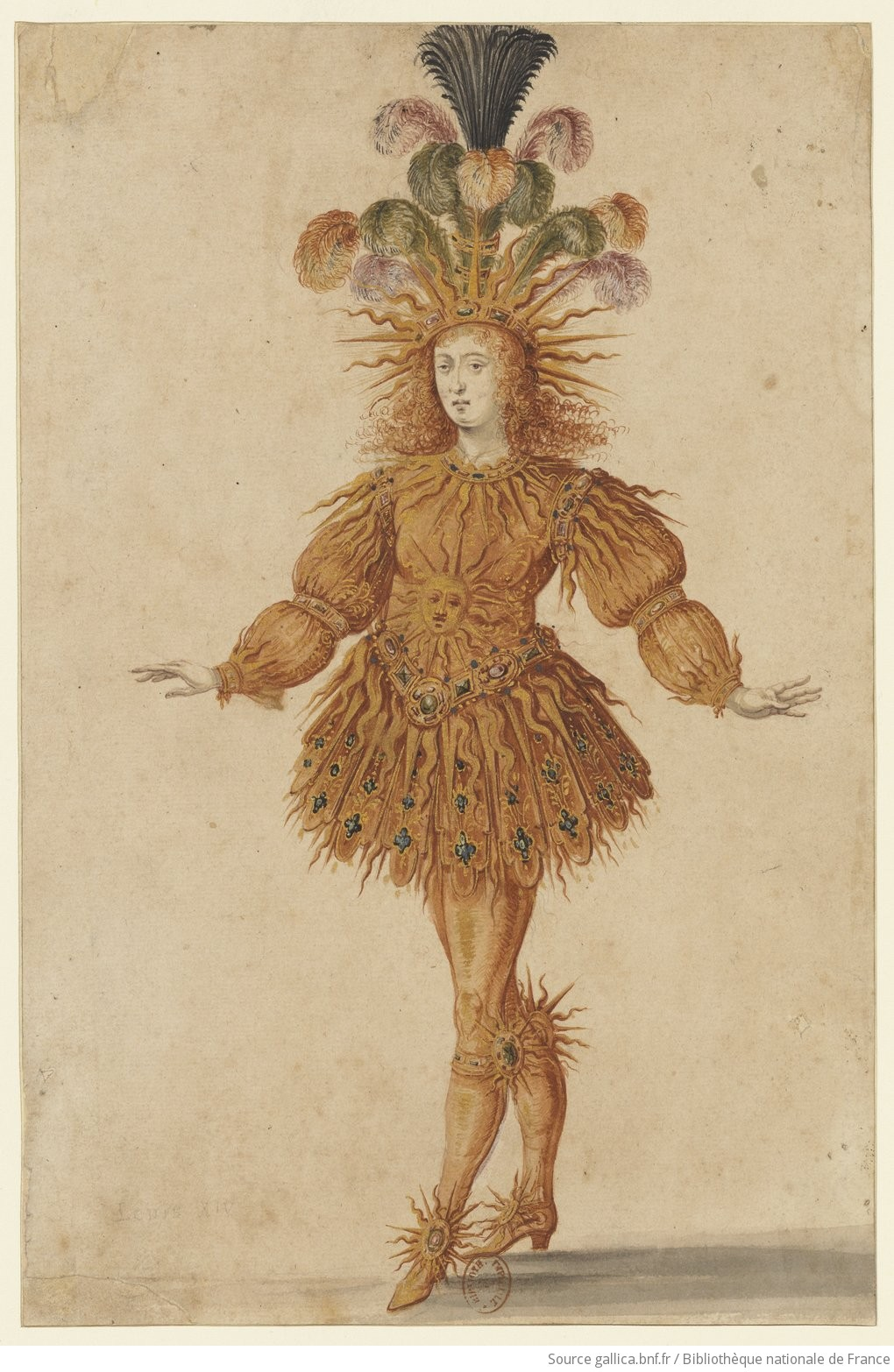
One of Louis XIV's costumes in Ballet Royal de la Nuit, 1653

Much like England, France also had a tradition of cross-casting, but by the second half of the 17th century these roles had dwindled. They existed in unique forms during the reign of Louis XIV however—mainly in comedy, school drama, ballet, and opera. By the mid-sixteenth century, female actors in France became more and more common, but they were selective in the roles they wished to play. French female actors did not want to play unglamourous or "ugly" women, so these roles were often cross-cast. One example of this is the nourrice, or "nurse" archetype—a male-acted older, humorous, post-menopausal woman whose undesirability contrasted the primary female roles played by women.

In the Ballet de cour tradition, men often played women. Famously, King Louis XIV performed in many such roles. For Louis XIV, cross-dressing in a theatre context was not satirical but rather a show of power. When performing, these men dressed in distinct costumes. They wore skirts, but their hemlines rose above the knee, displaying their thighs in a style that would have been prohibited for women but was permitted for men. This placed these roles in a third category that was neither man nor woman precisely.

== 19th- and 20th-century cross-gender acting ==
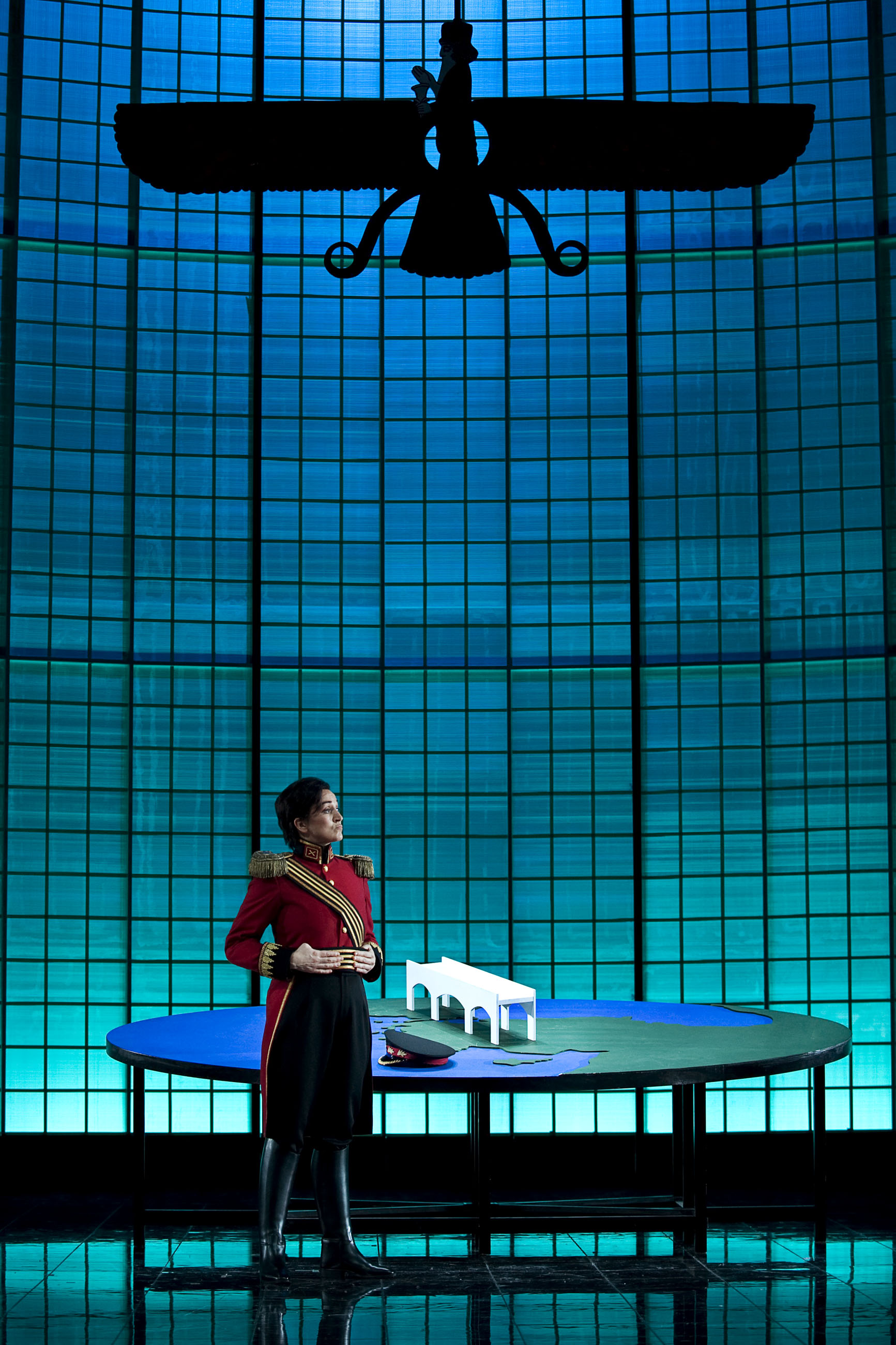
Katarina Karnéus as Serse in a 2009 production of Serse at the Royal Swedish Opera

=== American and European theatre, operas, plays, ballets and pantomime ===
A travesti is a theatrical term referring to the portrayal of a character in an opera, play, or ballet by a performer of the opposite sex. More specifically, a theatrical or operatic role in which an actress appears in male clothing is called a "breeches role" ("pants role" or "trouser role"), and roles once performed by a male soprano castrato may instead be performed by a female mezzo-soprano or contralto.

In the late 19th century, one of the most famous actresses was Vesta Tilley, who worked in a music hall from age five well into her fifties. In the late 1890s, she was the highest paid woman in Britain. What made her so famous was her tendency to dress as a man and act out "masculine" scenes and roles. Centuries before, Julie d'Aubigny, aka "La Maupin" (1670–1707), had also been famous for her breeches roles.

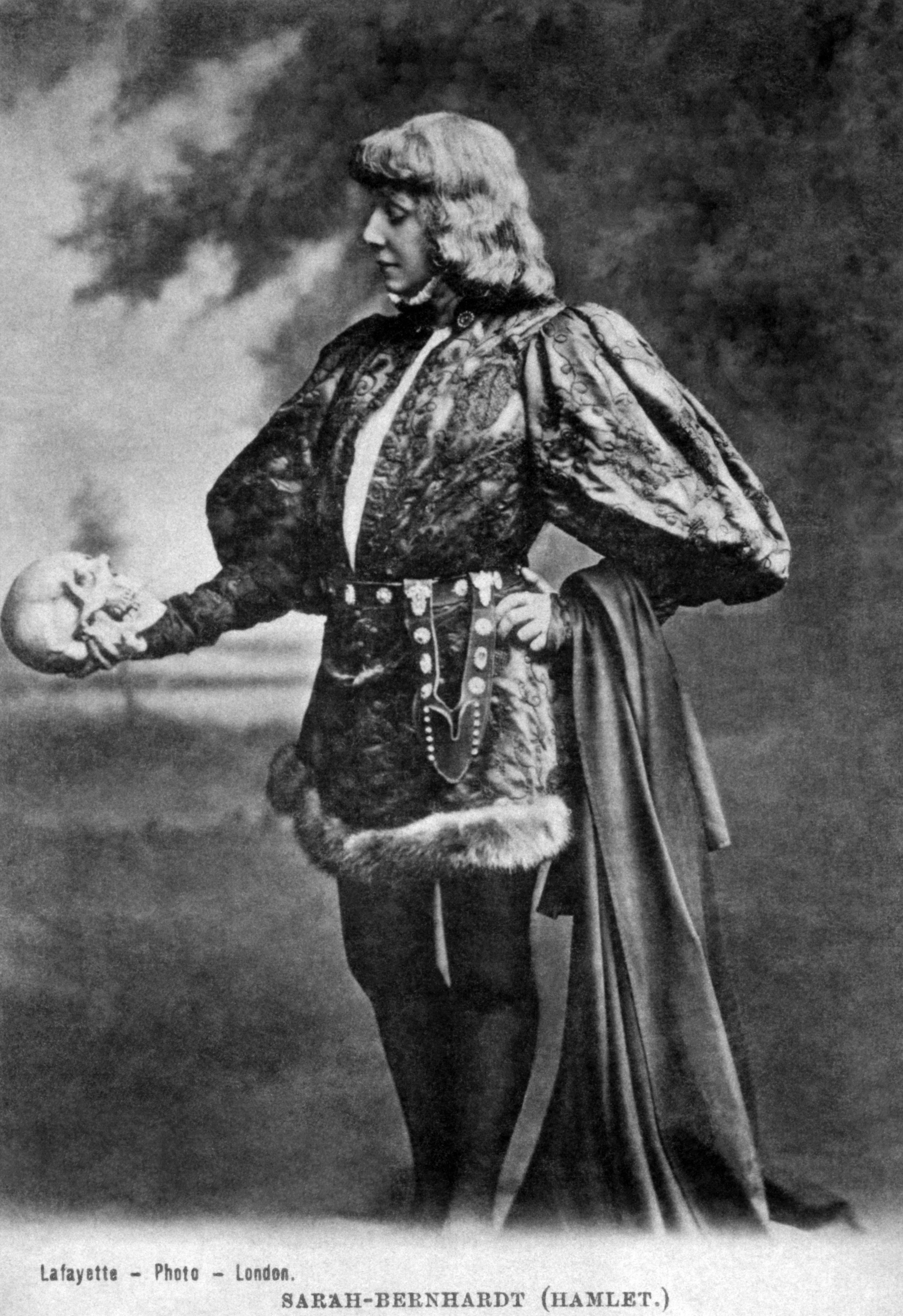
Sarah Bernhardt as Prince Hamlet in June 1899

In 1904, Nina Boucicault originated the theatrical tradition of cross-sex casting for Peter Pan, continued thereafter by Maude Adams, Marilyn Miller, Eva Le Gallienne, Sandy Duncan, and Cathy Rigby, among others. In 1954 Mary Martin portrayed the title character in the musical Peter Pan. "The boy who would never grow up" is a classic trouser role, as is Cherubino in The Marriage of Figaro (by Beaumarchais).

In pantomime plays that are traditionally adaptations of fairy tales and performed around Christmastide, the role of lead male was once commonly played by a principal boy—a young, attractive, female. This practise has fallen out of favour recently, with popular male television and pop stars taking these roles. Conversely, the role of a pantomime dame, a middle aged woman played by a man in drag for comic relief, is still one of the mainstays of panto.

Similarly, Georgy Millyar played a role of Baba Yaga, an ugly old woman with supernatural abilities in a dozen of films, including Vasilisa the Beautiful (1940) and Jack Frost (1964). He used to say that an actress does not ever allow anyone to make her that ugly, while he does.

==== French salon theatre ====
Into the 19th and 20th centuries, French anthropologist Jane Dieulafoy and her husband Marcel hosted private salons where they staged classical plays. The genders of the characters stayed true to the original texts, but the actors were cast blindly with no regard for gender.

=== Chinese theatre ===
After the May Fourth Movement in the 1910s, women were once again permitted to perform in China, and both men and women were cast true to their gender.

Many of the characters in Chinese Opera were performed by men; they cross-dressed to play the roles of women. A famous cross-dressing opera singer is Mei Lanfang.

In the early 20th century, the Shanghainese Yue opera genre developed from an all male to an all female genre. During a particularly turbulent period of Chinese history, Yue opera offered female actors and audiences a voice beyond the nationalist narrative often associated with the May Fourth Movement and Cultural Revolution. In a society undergoing drastic social change, including shifting ideas of gender and family structures, Yue opera catered to two of the public's new fixations: women and romance. The singers explored the realities of womanhood, being an immigrant, urbanization, and voicelessness, creating a women's culture and supporting the idea that women should be at the forefront of a modern nation. Although male performers were introduced into this opera in the 1950s and 1960s, today, Yue opera is still associated as the only all female opera and the second most popular opera in China.

=== Japanese theatre ===
==== The Takarazuka Revue ====
The Takarazuka Revue is a contemporary all-female Japanese acting company, known for their elaborate productions of stage musicals. Female performers act in both male and female roles.

Takarazuka was created in the early 20th century by Ichizō Kobayashi Takarazuka. The performers attend the Takarazuka Music School (Takarazuka Ongaku Gakkō) for two years to receive training. Actresses specialize in either male roles (otokoyaku) or female roles (musumeyaku), with male-role actresses receiving top billing. The performers are evaluated based on appearance, behavioral performance ability, and facial/body signifiers (e.g. jaw structure, eyebrows, height, shoulder span). Additionally, behavioral test runs examine the voice, mannerisms, and overall persona of the performers.

===== Gender politics and the otokoyaku =====
Despite providing opportunities for women onstage, the structure of Takarazuka still reflected the patriarchal control of Japan. The musumeyaku represented fictional, masculinist recreations of women. As for the otokoyaku, their roles aimed to emulate a model man that women would desire.

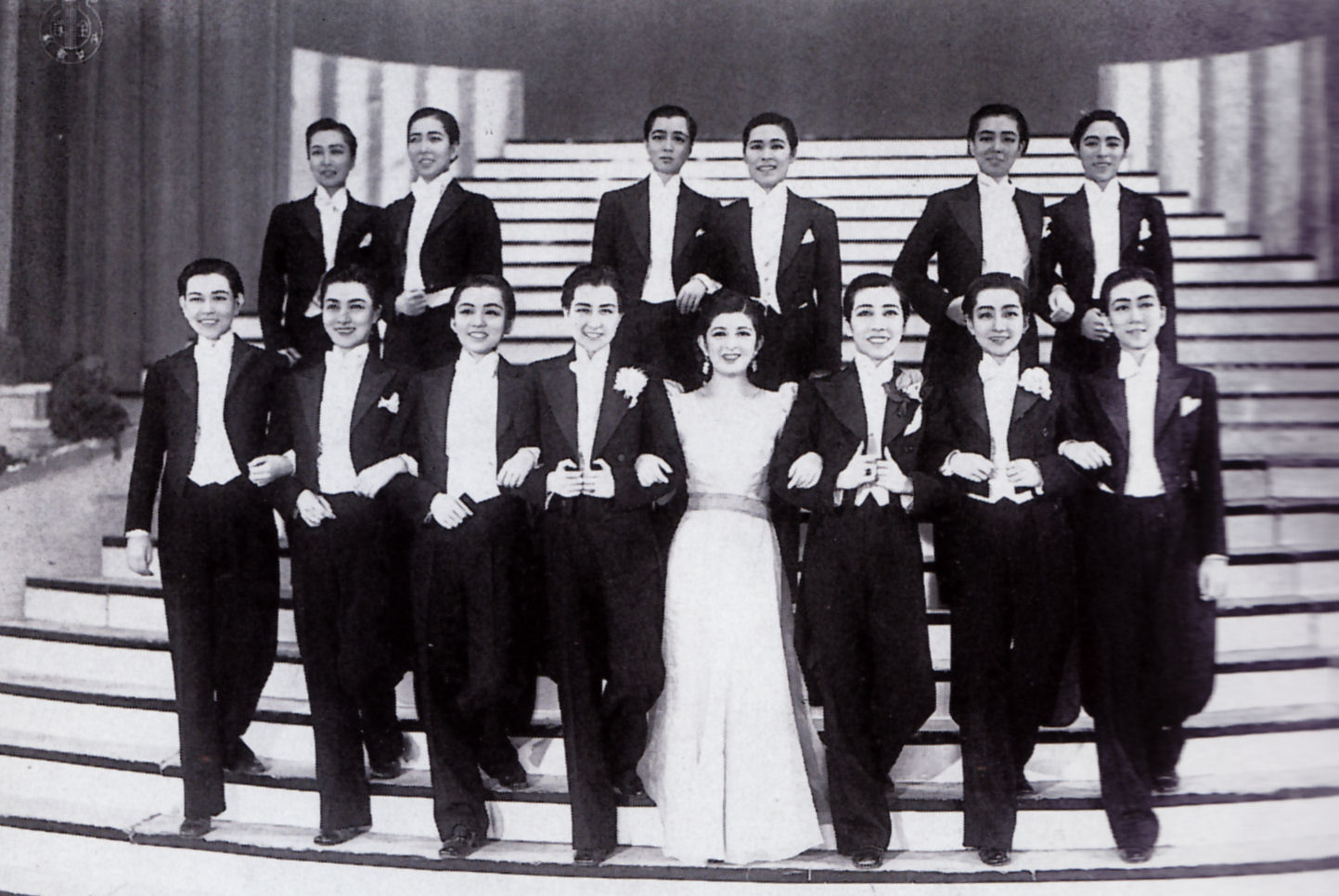
Otokoyaku characters, men played by women, in a 1939 Takarazuka Revue performance

To further explain the role of the otokoyaku 'male' character, Lorie Brau contends that, "The otokoyaku does not represent a 'nama no otoko', that is to say, a 'man in the raw', but an idealized, 'beautiful' man—a man without dirt, sweat, roughness, and a need to dominate. The otokoyaku's female following see her as a version of this kind of androgynous, safe beauty rarely found in real men". Therefore, while the otokoyaku presents a male guise that is the "risoteki na dansei" (ideal man) women are attracted to, the otokoyaku also represents a type of androgynous freedom for the female viewer. Fans see women breaking the confines of societal expectations, as well as embracing the feminine side of the male-masculine image. However, despite this progressive multi-dimensional role of the otokoyaku, the reality of expressing these interpretations onstage is limited for the performers. With the creation of the Takarazuka Revue Company, Ichizō Kobayashi intended to use the troupe to reinforce the patriarchal status quo of Japan by training his female performers how to be obedient women and "good wives and wise mothers". Despite the non-conventional otokoyaku, Robertson states that Kobayashi believed women would, through their performances as men, "[learn] to understand and appreciate males and the masculine psyche".

=== Ethiopian theatre ===
Throughout the 20th century, a Western theatre tradition developed in Ethiopia, starting in 1913 with the play Ye Awrewoch Commedia by Tekle Hawariat Tekle Mariyam. All parts were played by boys. As the tradition grew over the decades with the development of new theatre companies, the boys themselves were unhappy playing women; some feared embarrassment, while others were afraid of being recognized in their feminine roles. At the boys' urging, the troupes began actively recruiting girls.

At the Empress Menen Girls' Boarding School, Ethiopian scholar, writer, and politician Senedu Gebru wrote and directed plays for her female students between 1942 and 1955. With the students' parents as audience members, these plays were performed at the end of the school year. Girls played both male and female roles.

After the fall of the Government of the Ethiopian Empire and with the opening of the Theatre Arts Department at Addis Ababa University, the 1970s saw further efforts to involve women onstage. Male-as-female cross-casting thus fell out of fashion.

=== Indian theatre ===
In the Indian context, Parsi, Gujarati, and Marathi theatrical traditions from the 19th and 20th centuries cast men in female roles. Where women lacked public visibility, these roles introduced audiences to the idea of women in public life. Female impersonators allowed audiences to engage with femininity. Women could then use the traits that were considered acceptable in theatre characters as a pathway into their own public life. Within theatre itself, female impersonators also created niches that female performers could occupy later.

== Modern practices of cross-gender acting ==
In animations and video games, it is not unusual for female actors to voice young male characters, especially prepubescent ones. Notable examples are Nancy Cartwright voicing Bart Simpson in The Simpsons and Junko Takeuchi voicing Naruto Uzumaki in the anime series Naruto. Voice actress Tara Strong has voiced multiple young male characters such as Timmy Turner and Ben Tennyson. Instances of male actors voicing female characters have also occurred, including Bob Peterson as Roz in Monsters, Inc. and Brad Bird as Edna Mode in the Incredibles franchise.

In musical theatre, some characters have become synonymous with cross-sex acting. The musical Hairspray frequently sees a male actor portraying the female role of Edna Turnblad, whilst the role of Miss Trunchbull in Matilda the Musical is traditionally a male performer. However, whilst Edna was played by a cross cast John Travolta in the film adaptation, Miss Trunchbull in the film of Matilda was instead played by actress Emma Thompson.

In children's theatre productions, male roles will often be played by girls due to the majority of children participating in theatre at a young age being girls.

When the casting director of a production decides to employ cross-sex acting, selecting the actors in this way is sometimes also called "cross-sex casting" or simply "cross-casting".

Increasingly, modern American theatre is cast "blindly," in which roles are determined based on talent, regardless of "gender, race, age, and body type."

=== Film and television examples ===
Release year	Title	Actor	Role	Direction	Role	Language	Note(s)
1914	A Busy Day	Charlie Chaplin	Wife	male to female	comedic	English	
1914	Sweedie the Swatter	Wallace Beery	Sweedie	male to female	comedic	English	The first of a series of Sweedie films, made between 1914 and 1916. This short was released 13 July 1914.
1920	Treasure Island	Shirley Mason	Jim Hawkins	female to male	dramatic	English	
1921	Little Lord Fauntleroy	Mary Pickford	Cedric Errol	female to male	dramatic	English	Mary Pickford starred as both Cedric Errol and Widow Errol.
1924	Peter Pan	Betty Bronson	Peter Pan	female to male	dramatic	English	
1932	The Old Dark House	Elspeth Dudgeon	Sir Roderick Femm	female to male	dramatic	English	credited as 'John Dudgeon'
1936	Stars on Parade	Arthur Lucan	Old Mother Riley	male to female	musical	English	The first of 17 films with Old Mother Riley
1936	Sathi Leelavathi	M. K. Mani	Lakshmi	male to female	dramatic	Tamil	
1939	Wilton's Zoo	Annie van Ees	Jan Grovers (Boefje)	female to male	dramatic	Dutch	45-year-old Annie van Ees plays the 16-year-old Boefje. She had played this role since 1922 in theatre.
1942	Cactus Makes Perfect	Monte Collins	Ma Stooge	male to female	comedic	English	
1949	Kind Hearts and Coronets	Alec Guinness	Lady Agatha D'Ascoyne	male to female	comedic	English	Alec Guinness plays eight members of the aristocratic D'Ascoyne family.
1954	The Belles of St. Trinian's	Alastair Sim	Headmistress Fritton	male to female	comedic	English	Alastair Sim plays both Millicent Fritton and her brother, Clarence Fritton.
1957	Blue Murder at St Trinian's	Alastair Sim	Headmistress Fritton	male to female	comedic	English	
1959	The Mouse that Roared	Peter Sellers	Grand Duchess Gloriana XII	male to female	comedic	English	
1962	Sjors en Sjimmie op het pirateneiland	Jos van der Linden	Sjimmie	female to male	dramatic	Dutch	Sjimmie is played by director Henk van der Linden's daughter in blackface.
1963	Just for Fun	Dick Emery	Athenae Perkins / Dawn Tankard	male to female	comedic	English	Dick Emery plays two male and two female Juke Box Jury members.
1965	Sjors en Sjimmie en de gorilla	Jos van der Linden	Sjimmie	female to male	dramatic	Dutch	
1967	Bhakta Prahlada	Roja Ramani	Prahlada	female to male	dramatic	Telugu	
1976−2023	various	Barry Humphries	Dame Edna Everage	male to female	comedic	English	
1977	Sjors en Sjimmie en het zwaard van Krijn	Mariska Fikkie	Sjimmie	female to male	dramatic	Dutch	credited as 'Mar Fikkie'
1977	Die Vorstadtkrokodile	Birgit Komanns	Kurt	female to male	dramatic	German	voice dubbed by Oliver Rohrbeck
1978	Monkey (Saiyūki)	Masako Natsume	Tripitaka	female to male	dramatic	Japanese	
1979	Monty Python's Life of Brian	Terry Jones	Brian's mother	male to female	comedic	English	
1980	The Empire Strikes Back	Marjorie Eaton	Palpatine	female to male	dramatic	English	voice dubbed by Clive Revill original release version only
1981	Göta kanal eller Vem drog ur proppen?	Christer Lindarw	Queen Silvia	male to female	comedic	Swedish	Cameo
1981	Sopor	Margaretha Krook	Gösta Bohman	female to male	comedic	Swedish	Small role
1982	Fanny and Alexander	Stina Ekblad	Ismael Retzinsky	female to male	dramatic	Swedish	
1982	The Year of Living Dangerously	Linda Hunt	Billy Kwan	female to male	dramatic	English	Hunt won Academy Award for Best Actress in a Supporting Role
1983	Trenchcoat	Ronald Lacey	Princess Aida	male to female	comedic	English	
1985	Non-Stop Trouble with the Family	Dieter Hallervorden	Florentine	male to female	comedic	German	
1986	Crocodile Dundee	Anne Carlisle	Gwendoline	female to male	comedic	English	The character is a male-to-female transvestite.
1986	The Golden Child	J.L. Reate	The Golden Child	female to male	dramatic	English	Reate was nominated to a Young Artist Awards for Best Young Actress
1986	Haunted Honeymoon	Dom DeLuise	Aunt Kate	male to female	comedic	English	
1988	Hairspray	Divine	Edna Turnblad	male to female	comedic	English	
1988	Coming to America	Arsenio Hall	Extremely Ugly Girl	male to female	comedic	English	
1989	Back to the Future Part II	Michael J. Fox	Marlene McFly	male to female	comedic	English	Michael J. Fox plays three characters - Marty McFly, Marty McFly Jr. and Marlene McFly.
1989-1997	Mystery Science Theater 3000	Jim Mallon	Gypsy	male to female	comedic	English	
1991	Hook	Glenn Close	Gutless	female to male	dramatic	English	Cameo
1991	Nothing but Trouble	John Candy	Eldona	male to female	comedic	English	
1992−1997	Martin	Martin Lawrence	Sheneneh; Mama Payne	male to female	comedic	English	
1992	Swordsman II	Brigitte Lin	Invincible Asia	female to male	dramatic	English	Asia is a man who has castrated himself.
1992	Orlando	Tilda Swinton; Quentin Crisp	Orlando; Elizabeth I	female to male male to female	dramatic	English	The character of 'Orlando' changes gender, female to male.
1993	The Beverly Hillbillies	Diedrich Bader	Jethrine Bodine	male to female	comedic	English	Bader also plays Jethrine's twin brother Jethro.
1993	Iron Monkey	Angie Tsang	Wong Fei-hung	female to male	dramatic	Cantonese	
1995	Filmpje!	Paul de Leeuw	Annie de Rooij	male to female	comedic	Dutch	Paul de Leeuw introduced the character of Annie de Rooij in 1992 in the third seasons of his television show De schreeuw van De Leeuw. Annie was married to Bob de Rooij, also played by Paul de Leeuw.
1996	A Very Brady Sequel	RuPaul	Mrs. Cummings	male to female	comedic	English	
1996	The Nutty Professor	Eddie Murphy	Mama / Granny Klump	male to female	comedic	English	
1999	Deuce Bigalow: Male Gigolo	Big Boy	Fluisa	male to female	comedic	English	
1999	Tyrone	Coolio	Cherone	male to female	comedic	English	Coolio also plays Cherone's brothers, Tyrone & Jerome
1999	Liang Po Po The Movie	Jack Neo	Liang Po Po / Liang Xi Mei	male to female	comedic	Chinese and English	an 85 year old granny played by Singaporean filmmaker and actor Jack Neo.
2000	Nutty Professor II: The Klumps	Eddie Murphy	Mama / Granny Klump	male to female	comedic	English	
2000	Kevin & Perry Go Large	Kathy Burke	Perry	female to male	comedic	English	
2002	EvenHand	iO Tillett Wright	Toby	female to male	dramatic	English	
2003	Girls Will Be Girls	Jack Plotnick; Clinton Leupp; Jeffery Roberson	Evie Harris; Coco Peru; Varla Jean Merman	male to female	comedic	English	All the female characters in this film were played by males.
2004	De duistere diamant	Peter Van Den Begin	Tante Sidonia	male to female	comedic	Dutch	
2004	My Nikifor	Krystyna Feldman	Nikifor	female to male	dramatic	Polish	Feldman won 2005 Polish Film Awards for best actress
2005	Diary of a Mad Black Woman	Tyler Perry	Madea	male to female	comedic	English	
2005	Alatriste	Blanca Portillo	Emilio Bocanegra	female to male	dramatic	Spanish	
2006	Madea's Family Reunion	Tyler Perry	Madea	male to female	comedic	English	
2006	Black Christmas	Dean Friss	Agnes Lenz	male to female	horror	English	
2007	I'm Not There	Cate Blanchett	Jude Quinn	female to male	dramatic	English	Jude Quinn is stylized after Bob Dylan
2007	Hairspray	John Travolta	Edna Turnblad	male to female	comedic	English	
2007	Norbit	Eddie Murphy	Rasputia	male to female	comedic	English	
2007	St Trinian's	Rupert Everett	Miss Camilla Fritton	male to female	comedic	English	As in the earlier St. Trinian's films, a man plays the character of the Headmistress, Miss Fritton.
2007	Negima!!	Yukina Kashiwa	Negi Springfield	female to male	dramatic	Japanese	Live action adaptation of the manga Negima! Magister Negi Magi. The main character, Negi Springfield, is a 10-year-old mage.
2008	CJ7	Xu Jiao	Dicky Chow	female to male	comedic	Cantonese	
2008	Meet the Browns	Tyler Perry	Madea	male to female	comedic	English	
2009	Horst Schlämmer – Isch kandidiere!	Hape Kerkeling	Gisela; Uschi Blum; Angela Merkel; Ulla Schmidt	male to female	comedic	German	
2009	Madea Goes to Jail	Tyler Perry	Madea	male to female	comedic	English	
2009	St Trinian's 2: The Legend of Fritton's Gold	Rupert Everett	Miss Camilla Fritton	male to female	comedic	English	
2011	30 Rock	Margaret Cho	Kim Jong-Il	female to male	comedic	English	Cho was nominated to an Emmy for her guest role
2011	Jack and Jill	Adam Sandler; David Spade	Jill Sadelstein; Monica	male to female	comedic	English	Sandler plays both Jack and Jill Sadelstein
2012	Cloud Atlas	Hugo Weaving; Ben Whishaw; Zhou Xun; Susan Sarandon	Nurse Noakes; Georgette; Talbot; Yosouf Suleiman	male to female male to female female to male female to male	dramatic	English	
2012	Moron 5 and the Crying Lady	John Lapus; Jon Santos	Beckie Pamintuan; Albert's mother	male to female	comedic	Tagalog	
2014	Black Butler Live Action	Ayame Goriki	Earl Kiyohara Genpu	female to male	dramatic	Japanese	
2014	Mrs. Brown's Boys D'Movie	Brendan O'Carroll	Agnes Brown	male to female	comedic	English	
2014	Peter Pan Live!	Allison Williams	Peter Pan	female to male	dramatic	English	
2014	Predestination	Sarah Snook	The Unmarried Mother	female to male	dramatic	English	The character changes gender, female to male.
2015	Bon Bini Holland	Jandino Asporaat	Judeska; Gerrie	male to female	comedic	Dutch	
2016−2019	Baskets	Louie Anderson	Christine Baskets	male to female	comedic	English	Emmy Award for Supporting Actor in a Comedy Series
2018	Suspiria	Tilda Swinton	Dr. Jozef Klemperer	female to male	dramatic	English/German	One of three roles played by Swinton in the film
2019	The Twentieth Century	Louis Negin; Emmanuel Schwartz; Annie St-Pierre	Mother; Lady Violet; J. Israël Tarte	male to female male to female female to male	comedic	English	Film deliberately intended to come across unrealistic and dreamlike; also utilizes colour-blind casting in two other roles.
2022	Barbarian	Matthew Patrick Davis	The Mother	male to female	dramatic	English	
2023	Hemet, or the Landlady Don't Drink Tea	Brian Patrick Butler	Liz Topham-Myrtle	male to female	comedic	English	Butler also wrote, produced and edited the film.
2025	Fuck My Son!	Robert Longstreet	Vermina	male to female	comedic	English	
2025	Juffrouw Pots	Tygo Gernandt	Juffrouw Pots	male to female	comedic	Dutch	

=== Meta examples ===
- Tootsie (1982) - The character Michael Dorsey (portrayed by Dustin Hoffman) stars as Dorothy Michaels in the show-within-show soap opera Southwest General.
- Victor/Victoria (1982) - The character Victoria Grant (portrayed by Julie Andrews) pretends to be Count Victor Grezinski and finds work as a female impersonator.
- Flickan vid stenbänken (1989) - The character Carolin (Anna Edlund) briefly portrays a man in a (show-within-show) play.
- Shakespeare in Love (1998) - The character Viola de Lesseps (portrayed by Gwyneth Paltrow) disguises herself as Thomas Kent, then plays the part of Juliet in the show-within-show Romeo and Juliet.
- Mrs. Doubtfire (1993) - The character Daniel Hillard (Robin Williams) dresses as nanny Mrs. Doubtfire and is hired to host a children's show.
- High School Musical: The Musical: The Series (2019–present) - The character Seb (Joe Serafini) plays the part of Sharpay Evans in the school production of High School Musical.

=== Video game examples ===
- New Super Mario Bros. Wii (2009) - A few Koopalings, including Larry, Lemmy and Morton, are voiced by Lani Minella.
- Kid Icarus: Uprising (2012) - Pit is portrayed by Minami Takayama, who majorly voiced as him for the Super Smash Bros. series.
- Genshin Impact (2020) - Venti is voiced by Erika Harlacher.

== See also ==
- Drag queen § Female impersonator
- Cross-dressing in film and television
- Cross-dressing in literature
- Köçek, a Turkish term for a young male entertainer dressed as a young woman
- List of transgender-related topics
- List of transgender characters in film and television
