= Trick! The Musical =

Musical by Jason Schafer and Arthur LaFrentz Bacon

- Debut promotional artwork
- Music: Arthur LaFrentz Bacon
- Lyrics: Jason Schafer
- Book: Jason Schafer
- Basis: Trick by Jason Schafer
- Premiere: May 1, 2025: Out Front Theater Company, Atlanta, Georgia
- Productions: 2025 Atlanta, Georgia

Trick! The Musical is a musical with a book and lyrics by Jason Schafer and music by Arthur LaFrentz Bacon. It is based on the 1999 film by Jim Fall, which was also written by Schafer. The musical focuses on two young gay men in New York City, Gabriel, an aspiring musical writer, and Mark, a personal trainer and former go-go boy, who meet and attempt to hook up, only to have every attempt foiled across the city, through a combination of their wacky friends and acquaintances, enemies, and their own neuroses and sordid pasts.

Directed by Paul Conroy and choreographed by Jonathan Bryant, the original production of Trick! The Musical premiered in Atlanta, Georgia, at the Out Front Theater Company in 2025. The show received positive reviews from critics and ran until May 17, 2025.

In March 2026, an industry reading of the musical directed by Jeff Calhoun featured J. Harrison Ghee.

== Background ==
After college at UCLA, Schafer moved to New York City and attended the Broadcast Musical Inc. writer's workshop, where he got the idea to write what would become the movie Trick. Having written several musicals during college, Schafer initially wrote Trick as a musical called Gay Boy. He showed the work to his friend, actor Anthony Rapp, who suggested that he write it as a movie, instead. An actor involved with the script reading contacted Jim Fall, who eventually directed the film.

Independently produced, the film was picked up for North American distribution by Fine Line Features soon after being screened at the Sundance Film Festival in January 1999. The film starred Christian Campbell, John Paul Pitoc, Miss Coco Peru, and Tori Spelling, and went on to become a gay cult classic.

== Development and debut ==
Paul Conroy, founder and producing artistic director of Out Front Theater Company, contacted Schafer near the end of 2021 expressing interest in adapting Trick as a stage musical. Conroy was seeking material that spotlighted positive and joyful queer content for audiences, hoping the positive content would be galvanizing and restorative in the face of political turmoil facing queer communities. Conroy thought emailing Schafer was a long-shot, but Schafer, who had been approached in the past about adapting the film into a musical, responded with interest after hearing Conroy's interest in uplifting positive stories for the local queer audience as part of Out Front Theater's mission. Following his agreement to adapt the film, Schafer and Conroy met up in New York to review drafts of the musical. Composer David Gurksy was initially involved with the production, but later left the project. Schafer later brought on Bacon, who wrote 15 new songs for the production. Conroy also arranged a private staged reading in Atlanta at Out Front Theater to allow the creative team to get the production ready.

The musical debuted on May 1, 2025, as Out Front Theater's closing production of its 9th season, with a planned run until May 17.

The debut production starred Aavyn Lee as Gabriel, Will-Franklin Eller as Mark, Leah Keelan as Kathryn, Kayce Denise as Terri—based on the film's character Perry, Gabriel's musical workshop mentor—and featured local Atlanta drag queens Tugboat the Queen and Yutoya Avazé Leon trading off performances as the "Drag Superstar" role. Schafer, not wanting to mimic the role of Miss Coco Peru in the original film, which he found inimitable, wrote the subsequent role in the script as "Drag Superstar". His intention was for the role to be cast in subsequent productions with a local drag performer playing themselves, with small tailoring of the role to fit the performer. Dual casting also allowed cast members to play various additional roles in the production, notably with Chase Graham as Rich, Jahari Franklin as Kathyrn's stage manager Joe, and Jessica Hill as Judy. Tabitha Cheyenne and Logan Reed served as the production's understudies.

== Synopsis ==
=== Act I ===
Gabriel is a young temp aspiring to write his first musical. He reflects on his happiness living in New York City ("I Got a Place"), where he shares a studio apartment with his straight roommate Rich. Rich tells him that he needs the apartment for the entire night, because his girlfriend, Judy, will be returning from Europe for one night. Unable to protest, Gabriel meets up with his high school best friend and aspiring actress, Kathryn, who is set to debut that night in a local production of an all-female and nonbinary rendition of "Kiss Me, Kate", where she is the understudy for Gangster #2.

Together, they attend the New York New Writers for New Musical Theater Workshop (NYNWNMW) led by Gabriel's mentor, Terri, ("The Workshop Song") where he debuts the love song he's been working on, performing it with Kathryn ("Trick"). Terri and the workshoppers are underwhelmed. Terri, newly single and bitter, suggests that it does not feel authentic, and encourages Gabriel to write what's in his heart. She asks him what he felt when he received a kiss like the one in his song, but Gabriel says that he doesn't know. Terri consoles him by inviting him and Kathryn to the local piano bar, but he declines, as he must attend Kathryn's opening night ("I Got a Place (Reprise)").

With some time to spare, Gabriel goes to a gay bar, where he feels insecure ("Gabriel at a Gay Bar"). He bumps into the attractive Mark, who asks if he wants to hook up, but Gabriel explains that he can't host. Mark is also unable to host, but convinces Gabriel that they can hook up at Gabriel's apartment in the few hours before Rich returns ("Hot Summer Night"). They arrive at Gabriel's apartment to find Kathryn there hanging out before her show's debut. Kathryn, not getting the hint, proceeds to profess Gabriel's songwriting talent to Mark as the boys awkwardly sit together ("Original Song by Gabe"). Gabriel finally kicks Kathryn out, but promises to attend her show. The two strip down to have sex, but as they begin to talk, Mark, intrigued, asks Gabriel to sing one of the songs he's written. Embarrassed, Gabriel complies ("Love Song for My Future Boyfriend"). Rich returns early with Judy and kicks them out.

At the piano bar, Terri, dejected, reminisces about her ex-girlfriend moving out ("Cash-Only Sing-Along Piano Bar"). Gabriel finds her and asks if he can use her empty apartment, for the sake of "research" for his song. Terri agrees, but encounters her ex. With the boys' help, she and her girlfriend reconcile and the boys let them use the apartment instead. With no options, the boys plan to part ways and Mark offers to walk Gabriel to the subway station ("Lemme Walk You to the Train"). As they do, Mark explains that he lives with his extended family, and that he often likes riding the train to catch the sunrise. He has a last minute idea for them to go dancing at a gay bar he frequents. Gabriel is unsure, but relents, texting Kathryn that he won't make it to her show.

Unfortunately, the bar is featuring a local drag queen, who spots Mark. The drag queen proceeds to tell the audience that Mark used to be one of her go-go boys, but left after sleeping with all of her crew, humiliating Mark, and implying his interest is Gabriel is superficial. Before he can explain, Gabriel runs off, and Mark is prevented from following him by the drag queen and her backup dancers ("Dance Floor").

=== Act II ===
Kathryn is upset to see Gabriel's text, but learns that she will be going onstage as Gangster #2. She is excited for her "big break" and channels her anger at Gabriel into her performance ("Nobody's Understudy"). Gabriel tries to catch Kathryn's show, but it is sold out and the manager, Joe, refuses to let him in. Dejected, Gabriel leaves ("I Got a Place (Reprise)"). The drag queen appears on the street and sings a song to the audience expressing the folly of love ("Up With Love").

Gabriel bumps into Mark, who is waiting on his street. He tells him to leave, but Mark says he can't because he left his keys in Gabriel's apartment. They interrupt Rich and Judy having sex, and Rich angrily tells them they have until he's out of the shower. Judy, aspiring to be a sex counselor, tries to help the boys communicate as they search. Gabriel is exasperated and calls the night a waste of time. Mark is hurt, and tells him that he actually had a good time with Gabriel. He reveals that he had his keys the whole time, and only wanted to spend more time with him, before leaving ("Like All the Times Before"). Judy is put off by Rich's boorishness and leaves him.

Gabriel meets up with Terri to inform her that he plans to quit musical theater, since he clearly knows nothing about love after messing up the night with Mark. Terri and the workshoppers tell him that he still has the whole rest of the night in front of him, and that anything could change, just like how he and Mark changed her relationship in an instant ("What Half a Night Can Do"). Gabriel runs into Kathryn, whose performance was a hit, and is on her way to the cast party. They reconcile, and Kathryn gets him two comp tickets for tomorrow night's show for him and Mark, and reassures him that his music can make anyone fall in love with him ("Original Song by Gabe (Reprise)". Gabriel decides to give love a shot and resolves to figure things out ("Love Song for My Future Boyfriend (Reprise)"). He waits at the train station, knowing Mark will eventually arrive to catch the sunrise. The two reconcile, realizing that the pressure of sex was messing things up. They kiss and decide to first go on a date together tomorrow and try again ("Maybe This is Better"). Gabriel resolves to write something more authentic, inspired by the night they've had, and the show ends with a big celebratory finale with the entire company ("Finale").

== Characters ==
Character	Description	Notes
Gabriel	A temp and aspiring musical writer	
Mark	A nursing student, personal trainer, and former go-go dancer	
Kathryn	An aspiring actress and Gabriel's high school friend	Spelled differently from the film's "Katherine"
Terri	Leader of the NYNWNMW and Gabriel's mentor, who is newly single	Based on the film's character Perry
"Drag Superstar"	A drag performer with a sordid past involvement with Mark	Intended to be performed and named after a local drag performer cast in the role
Rich	Gabriel's straight roommate	
Judy	Rich's girlfriend and aspiring sex counselor	
Joe	Kathryn's stage manager	

== Casts ==
Casts
Character	World Premier (Atlanta)
Character	2025
Gabriel	Aavyn Lee
Mark	Will-Franklin Eller
Kathryn	Leah Keelan
Terri	Kayce Denise
"Drag Superstar"	Tugboat the Queen & Yutoya Avazé Leon (dual cast in alternating performances as themselves)
Rich/Backup Boy "Crinkle Cut"/Workshopper	Chase Graham
Judy/Terri's Ex/Gabriel's Boss/Bartender/Deejay/Workshopper	Jessica Hill
Joe/Backup Boy "Mt. Vesuvias"/Workshopper	Jahari Franklin

== Musical numbers ==
Atlanta Run

Act I

- "I Got a Place" — Gabriel
- "The Workshop Song" — Terri, Gabriel, Kathryn, & Workshoppers
- "Trick" — Kathryn & Gabriel
- "I Got a Place (Reprise)" — Gabriel
- "Gabriel at a Gay Bar" — Gabriel
- "Hot Summer Night" — Mark, Gabriel, Go-Go Boys, & Bartender
- "Original Song by Gabe" — Kathryn
- "Love Song for My Future Boyfriend" — Gabriel
- "Cash-Only Sing-Along Piano Bar" — Terri
- "Lemme Walk You to the Train" — Gabriel & Mark
- "Dance Floor" — Drag Superstar, Deejay, & Backup Boys

Act II

- "Nobody's Understudy" — Kathryn
- "I Got a Place (Reprise)" — Gabriel
- "Up With Love" — Drag Superstar
- "Like All the Times Before" — Mark
- "What Half a Night Can Do" — Terri, Gabriel, & Workshoppers
- "Original Song by Gabe (Reprise)" — Kathryn
- "Love Song for My Future Boyfriend (Reprise)" — Gabriel
- "Maybe This is Better" — Gabriel & Mark
- Finale — Company

== Critical response ==
Sammie Purcell, writing for Rough Draft Atlanta, gave the production a positive review, stating, "[W]hat the musical lacks in scale, it makes up for in energy. Bacon's mix of musical theater/pop works well for a story like this, with some genuinely great stand-out songs in the bunch, and the cast sells this quirky queer love story with genuine heart and humor." She cited Kayce Denise as Terri and Leah Keelan as Kathryn as particular standouts.

Benjamin Carr, of ArtsATL likewise gave the show a positive review, and noted Denise as a stand out performance, saying the story of "Cash-Only Sing-Along Piano Bar" "gives [Denise] the chance, while sitting in a chair on a bare stage, to take the audience on an entire emotional journey in five minutes [...] It's a delight to have good musicals like this one [...] originate in Atlanta. Trick is very satisfying."
