= Hochstrasser =

Hochstrasser is a surname. Notable people with the surname include:

- Alfred Hochstrasser, American composer and record producer
- Erwin Hochsträsser, Swiss footballer
- Robin M. Hochstrasser (1931–2013), Scottish-born American chemist
- Xavier Hochstrasser (born 1988), Swiss footballer
