= Varla =

Varla may refer to:

- Zubin Varla (born 1970), British actor and singer
- Varla Jean Merman, American actor, singer and drag performer
