= Mystro Clark =

American entertainer

- Born: December 29, 1966 (age 59); Dayton, Ohio, U.S.
- Occupation: Comedian
- Years active: 1992–present
- Website: www.mystroclark100.com

Mystro Clark (born December 29, 1966) is an American entertainer who was the second permanent American host of the syndicated version of the series Soul Train from 1997 until 1999. He went on to become a film and television actor and wrote for the show Cousin Skeeter. He also executive produced for the season premiere of American Soul in 2020.

He starred in TV series such as The Newz, The Show, Off Limits, and starred in Lovespring International. He made several guest appearances in television shows, and also has starred in the movies Chairman of the Board, Storm Catcher, and Out at the Wedding (2006).

In 2020, Clark appeared as a guest on the Studio 60 on the Sunset Strip marathon episode of The George Lucas Talk Show.

== Filmography ==
=== Film ===
Year	Title	Role	Notes
1998	Chairman of the Board	Ty	
1999	Storm Catcher	Captain 'Sparks' Johnson	
2007	Out at the Wedding	Dana	
2009	Shrink	Dr. Morton	

=== Television ===
Year	Title	Role	Notes
1992	Def Comedy Jam	Himself	Season 2, Episode 4
1993–2000	Soul Train	—N/a	33 episodes
1994	The Newz	—N/a	—N/a
1996	The Parent 'Hood	Troy	Episode: "We Don't Need Another Hero"
1996	The Show	Wilson Lee	8 episodes
1997	The Gregory Hines Show	Doug	Episode: "Boy's Night In"
1997	Rewind	Harv	—N/a
1998–2012	Awesome Adventures	—N/a	47 episodes
1999	Grown Ups	Neil Frazier	2 episodes
1999	Kenan & Kel	Eric	2 episodes
1999	Pacific Blue	Episode: "Ghost Town"	Episode: "Ghost Town"
2001	That's Life	Officer Johnson	Episode: "Boo!"
2002	One on One	Red Galloway	Episode: "Tame Me, I'm the Shrew"
2002	The Shield	Warner	Episode: "Throwaway"
2006	Lovespring International	Alex Odom	13 episodes
2006	Studio 60 on the Sunset Strip	Willy Wilz	Episode: "The Wrap Party"
2007	Kaya	L.A.	2 episodes
2020	The George Lucas Talk Show	Television special	Television special

=== Video games ===
Year	Title	Role	Notes
1997	Men in Black: The Game	Agent J / Jay Edwards	
