= The Newz =

- Genre: Sketch comedy Parody
- Created by: Michael Wilson
- Written by: Wayne Page, Jeff McCarthy, Jon Ezrine, Michael Price, David Litt, Andrew Ornstein, Micheal Globerman, JoJo Liblier, Terry Ward, Shang Forbes and Micheal Wilson
- Directed by: Tony Morina, Richie Namm (multi-camera)
- Starring: Tommy Blaze; Mystro Clark; Deborah Magdalena; Dan O'Connor; Stan Quash; Brad Sherwood; Nancy Sullivan; Shawn Alex Thompson; Lou Thornton
- Theme music composer: Jed Leiber & Wayne Page
- Country of origin: United States
- Original language: English
- No. of seasons: 1
- No. of episodes: 61

Production
- Executive producers: Michael Gerber, James McNamara
- Running time: 30 minutes
- Production companies: Celebrity Entertainment; Columbia Pictures Television Distribution

Original release
- Network: First-run syndication
- Release: September 12, 1994 – March 1995

The Newz was a half-hour syndicated sketch comedy television series that aired in 1994 and 1995. It starred Tommy Blaze, Mystro Clark, Deborah Magdalena, Dan O'Connor, Stan Quash, Brad Sherwood, Nancy Sullivan, Shawn Alex Thompson, and Lou Thornton. In addition to the main cast, regular guest stars included Melissa Savage, Mark Fenlon, Justin Cambridge, and Tim Watters as Bill Clinton. The series was produced from Universal Studios in Orlando, Florida.

The show was notable for being the first ever nightly scripted sketch comedy show, and was conceived and created by Executive Producer Michael Wilson. Rather than weekly as are most sketch comedies; the show aired five nights a week, plus a repeat episode on Saturdays. The writers were: Michael Wilson (Producer / Head Writer), Jeff McCarthy, Jon Ezrine, Michael Price, David Litt, Andrew Ornstein, Micheal Globerman, JoJo Liblier, Terry Ward, Shang Forbes and Wayne Page.

Recurring segments included:

- Tommy Blaze and the Newz, in which Blaze would deliver what was basically a monologue on recent news events. In this piece, Tommy would be seated in a chair modeled after Captain Kirk's command chair from the original Enterprise. Behind him was a wall of televisions. Tagline, "I'm not finished yet!"
- Ask Abby and Andy, a relationship advice segment in which Abby (Sullivan) would give caring, insightful advice in response to the mailed-in problems, after which Andy (Blaze) would give his outrageous (and usually sexist) point of view on the subject.
- Short humorous films by Thompson.
- Quash as someone who was extremely disgruntled because of his job; e.g., as "Bag Boy" who hates bagging groceries, conceived and written by Wayne Page & Jeff McCarthy as a vehicle for Quash. "Elf Boy" who hated working for Santa Claus, or as "Caddie Boy" who was sick and tired of putting up with bad golfers.
- Malcolm X in various situations where he would deliver some of his famed speeches. The title of the sketch was always a play on his name (and self-titled biography), for example "Malcolm FedEx", after the company.
- Tom Slack, segments starring Sherwood as a narcoleptic in high-stress jobs such as Airline Pilot, Heart Surgeon and Zeppelin Pilot on the Hindenburg. conceived and written by Wayne Page & Jeff McCarthy.
