= Lovespring International =

- Created by: Guy Shalem; Brad Isaacs
- Starring: Wendi McLendon-Covey; Sam Pancake; Mystro Clark; Jane Lynch; Jennifer Elise Cox; Jack Plotnick
- Music by: Guy Ross; Yotam Rosenbaum
- Country of origin: United States
- Original language: English
- No. of seasons: 1
- No. of episodes: 13

Production
- Executive producer: Eric McCormack
- Camera setup: Single-camera
- Running time: 30 minutes
- Production companies: Big Cattle Productions; Lionsgate Television

Original release
- Network: Lifetime Television
- Release: June 5 – September 18, 2006

Lovespring International is an American sitcom created by Guy Shalem and Brad Isaacs which aired on Lifetime on Mondays at 11 pm during the summer of 2006 in the United States. Lovespring was canceled on December 1, 2006. Executive produced by Big Cattle Productions (established by Will & Grace's Eric McCormack and business partner, Michael Forman), the show revolves around six employees at "Lovespring International", a dating agency located in Tarzana, California (even though it sells itself as an "elite Beverly Hills" company). There is at least one guest star per episode, and that guest is the seeker of a "match" in any particular episode.

The main characters, or employees, are manager Lydia Mayhew (played by Wendi McLendon-Covey), Victoria Ratchford (played by Jane Lynch), psychologist Steve Morris (played by Jack Plotnick), receptionist Tiffany Riley Clarke (played by Jennifer Elise Cox), staff videographer Alex Odom (played by Mystro Clark), and matchmakers Burke Kristopher (played by Sam Pancake).

== Cast ==
- Wendi McLendon-Covey as Lydia Mayhew
- Jack Plotnick as Steve Morris
- Jennifer Elise Cox as Tiffany Riley Clarke
- Sam Pancake as Burke Kristopher
- Mystro Clark as Alex Odom
- Jane Lynch as Victoria Ratchford

== Episodes ==
No.	Title	Directed by	Written by	Original release date
1	"Pilot"	Guy Shalem	Story by : : Brad Isaacs & Guy Shalem	June 5, 2006
2	"Lydia's Perfect Man"	Karen Maruyama	Story by : : Guy Shalem & Dennis Hensley	June 12, 2006
3	"A Rear Window"	Guy Shalem & Jack Plotnick	Story by : : Brad Isaacs & Guy Shalem	June 19, 2006
4	"Burke Makes a Friend"	Richard Day	Story by : : Patrick DeVine	June 26, 2006
5	"Lydia's Last Night"	Jack Plotnick	Story by : : Brad Isaacs & Guy Shalem	July 10, 2006
6	"The Loser Club"	Guy Shalem & Brad Isaacs	Story by : : Guy Shalem & Brad Isaacs	July 17, 2006
7	"The Last Temptation of Steve"	Guy Shalem & Jim Rash	Story by : : Guy Shalem & Dennis Hensley	August 7, 2006
8	"The Portrait and the Painter"	Guy Shalem	Story by : : Brad Isaacs & Patrick DeVine	August 18, 2006
9	"The Psychic"	Richard Day	Story by : : Patrick DeVine & Dennis Hensley	August 21, 2006
10	"Homeless Rockstar"	Guy Shalem & Karen Maruyama	Story by : : Michael C. Forman	August 28, 2006
11	"The Sperminator"	Richard Day	Story by : : Patrick Devine	September 4, 2006
12	"The Demuler"	Karen Maruyama	Story by : : Guy Shalem & Dennis Hensley	September 11, 2006
13	"The Fire"	Guy Shalem	Story by : : Michael C. Forman	September 18, 2006

== International broadcasters ==
Country	TV Network(s)	Series Premiere	Weekly Schedule
United States	Lifetime Television	June 5, 2006	Mondays at 8:00
United Kingdom	Sky One	August 5, 2007	Sundays at 22:35
Australia	The Comedy Channel		
Canada	Showcase		
Bulgaria	Fox life	March 1, 2007	Thursdays at 22:00
Czech Republic	HBO	September, 2006	Every day at 20:05
Portugal	Fox life		
Sweden	TV3		
Norway	TV3	May, 2008	Wednesdays at 23:00
Israel	HOT	January, 2007	
New Zealand	Prime		Every day at 22:30
