= Michael-James Olsen =

Australian/American film actor (born 1994)

- Born: 1994 (age 31–32)
- Occupation: Actor
- Years active: Since 2009

Michael-James Olsen (born 1994) is an Australian/American film actor.

== Career ==
Michael-James Olsen began his career by playing the young Victor Creed in the X-Men film X-Men Origins: Wolverine which was released worldwide on May 1, 2009.

== Skills ==
Olsen is an experienced surfer, and trained in bō staff and sword fighting. He also plays guitar and piano.

== Filmography ==
- Last Chance Holiday (2013)
- Kristin's Christmas Past (2013)
- Grey's Anatomy (2013)
- X-Men Origins: Wolverine (2009) as Young Victor Creed
