= Lorri Bagley =

American actress and model

- Born: August 5, 1973 (age 52); Dallas, Texas, U.S.
- Occupations: Actress, model
- Years active: 1982–2006; 2015
- Partner: Chris Farley (1993)

Lorri Bagley (born August 5, 1973) is an American former actress and model.

== Life and career ==
Lorri Bagley became a model in Europe by the age of 14, working for the likes of Dior, Chanel, and Issey Miyake as well as notably modelling for Victoria's Secret for five years. Bagley made her television debut at a young age appearing on Late Night with David Letterman in 1982.

She dated Chris Farley in 1993, and both starred and shared a brief scene together in the 1995 comedy film Tommy Boy.

She has appeared in other films such as Mickey Blue Eyes, and television productions such as 22 episodes of Veronica's Closet.

== Filmography ==
- Tommy Boy (1995) - Woman at Pool
- Kingpin (1996) - Beautiful Dancer
- The Deli (1997) - One-A-Day Girl
- 54 (1998) - Patti
- Celebrity (1998) - Gina
- As the World Turns (1 episode, 1998) (TV) - Lacey
- Mickey Blue Eyes (1999) - Antoinette
- Spin City (1 episode, 1999) (TV) - Mitsy
- Trick (1999) - Judy
- The Crew (2000/I) - Sofa Girl
- Veronica's Closet (20 episodes, 1999–2000) (TV) - June Bilson Anderson
- Third Watch (1 episode, 2001) (TV) - Bosco's Neighbor
- Peroxide Passion (2001) - Mimi
- B.S. (2002) (TV) - Hope Fisk
- Ice Age (2002) - Jennifer (voice)
- Poster Boy (2004) - Dierdre
- The Stepford Wives (2004) - Charmaine Van Sant
- Law & Order: Criminal Intent Bedfellows (TV Episode 2006)
- I Am Chris Farley (2015) - Herself

== Recognition ==
For her work in Peroxide Passion, Todd Anthony of Sun-Sentinel referred to Bagley as a "Star on the Horizon award-winner".

=== Awards and nominations ===
- 2001, President Award, Ft. Lauderdale International Film Festival
- 2001, Best Actress, The B-Movie Theater Film Fest
