= Kristin's Christmas Past =

- Written by: Rachel Stuhler
- Directed by: Jim Fall
- Starring: Shiri Appleby; Hannah Marks; Elizabeth Mitchell; Judd Nelson; Debby Ryan
- Theme music composer: Michael A. Levine
- Country of origin: United States
- Original language: English

Production
- Producers: Nancy Leopardi; Ross Kohn
- Editor: Josh Rifkin
- Production company: Indy Entertainment

Original release
- Network: Lifetime
- Release: November 23, 2013

Kristin's Christmas Past (previously entitled Last Chance Holiday) is an American comedy film directed by Jim Fall and written by Rachel Stuhler. Starring Shiri Appleby, Hannah Marks, Elizabeth Mitchell, Judd Nelson and Debby Ryan, the film premiered in the US on November 23, 2013, on Lifetime.

== Plot ==
Estranged from her family and alone on Christmas Eve, thirty-four-year-old Kristin (Shiri Appleby) wakes up Christmas morning seventeen years into her past to relive the worst Christmas of her life. Positioning herself as an older mentor to her younger self (Hannah Marks), Kristin now has a chance to change things – something that seems impossible, as her younger self is estranged from her mother, Barbara.

== Cast ==
- Shiri Appleby as Kristin Cartwell
  - Hannah Marks as Kristin Cartwell (17 years)
- Elizabeth Mitchell as Barbara Cartwell
- Judd Nelson as Glenn Cartwell
- Debby Ryan as Haddie
- Will Kemp as Jamie
  - Michael-James Olsen as Jamie (17 years)
- A. J. Langer as Debby
- Courtney Henggeler as Sophia
- Deniz Akdeniz as Maverick O’Dell

== See also ==
- List of Christmas films
