= Trick (1999 film) =

1999 American romantic comedy film

- Theatrical release poster
- Directed by: Jim Fall
- Written by: Jason Schafer
- Produced by: Jim Fall; Eric d'Arbeloff; Ross Katz
- Starring: Christian Campbell; John Paul Pitoc; Tori Spelling; Lorri Bagley; Brad Beyer; Steve Hayes; Clinton Leupp
- Cinematography: Terry Stacey
- Edited by: Brian A. Kates
- Music by: David Friedman
- Production companies: Good Machine; Roadside Attractions
- Distributed by: Fine Line Features
- Release dates: January 27, 1999 (Sundance); July 23, 1999 (United States)
- Running time: 89 minutes
- Country: United States
- Language: English
- Budget: $450,000
- Box office: $2 million

Trick is a 1999 American gay-themed romantic comedy film directed by Jim Fall and starring Christian Campbell, John Paul Pitoc, Miss Coco Peru, and Tori Spelling. Independently produced by Eric d'Arbeloff, Ross Katz, and Fall, the film was written by Jason Schafer. It premiered at the Sundance Film Festival in January 1999 and was later released theatrically by Fine Line Features that July. The film grossed $2 million at the United States box office, which was seen by Fine Line Features as "credible business".

Since its release, the film has been considered a gay cult classic. It was later adapted as a stage musical, titled Trick! The Musical, in 2025, with book and lyrics by Schafer and music by Arthur LaFrentz Bacon.

== Plot ==
Gabriel, an office temp by day and aspiring Broadway composer by night, makes eye contact with Mark, a go-go dancer at a gay bar. The two meet again in the subway the same night, and go back to Gabriel's place to have sex. They are thwarted in the attempt first by Gabriel's aspiring actress friend Katherine, who is obsessed with her role in an adaptation of Salomé set in a women's prison, and then by Gabriel's roommate Rich, who returns home with his girlfriend Judy and has similar (and conflicting) plans for the apartment.

Gabriel and Rich argue over which of them should get to use the apartment that night, and decide to settle the matter with a coin toss. When Gabriel loses the coin toss and he and Mark have to leave, Gabriel seeks out his friend Perry to request the use of Perry's place. Unfortunately, as Perry escorts Gabriel and Mark there, they run into Perry's ex-boyfriend. Perry and his ex tearfully reconcile and they go back to Perry's, frustrating Gabriel and Mark yet again. The two then decide to hit a gay club for some dancing. There, a malicious drag queen, Miss Coco, corners Gabriel in the restroom. She badmouths Mark to Gabriel, telling him of the time they tricked – which sounds very much like how Gabriel and Mark met – and how Mark left abruptly after climaxing, leaving her with a fake phone number to boot. Crushed by this news, Gabriel decides to take off.

Mark follows Gabriel back to his and Rich's apartment to talk – and also because he has left his house keys there. They go in to look for the keys and try to talk things out while Judy mediates, topless. Mark asserts that while he did indeed trick once with Miss Coco, it was actually the latter who tried to take advantage of him by secretly videotaping their encounter without Mark's consent. Gabriel accepts this story, but still does not trust Mark, so Mark leaves angrily. Judy then finds Mark's keys, and Gabriel chases after Mark with them down into the subway. Just when it seems that Mark is gone forever, he reappears; he and Gabriel made a connection after all.

Having reconciled, they decide to get something to eat but run into Katherine and some of her theatre friends at a diner, where Katherine proceeds to monopolize the conversation. Gabriel finally blows up at her, and Katherine, humiliated, melts down and leaves in a huff. Gabriel chases after her and apologizes; they smooth things over and Katherine and her friends depart. As the new morning dawns, Mark gives Gabriel his phone number, they kiss, and Mark heads home. Gabriel calls the number on a nearby payphone, and is relieved to learn that it's Mark's actual number. While they never found a spot to trick, Mark and Gabriel instead formed a budding relationship beyond the simple one-night stand they had first been trying for.

== Cast ==
- Christian Campbell as Gabriel
- John Paul Pitoc as Mark Miranda
- Tori Spelling as Katherine Lamberg
- Brad Beyer as Rich
- Lorri Bagley as Judy
- Steve Hayes as Perry
- Lacey Kohl as Genevieve
- Kevin Chamberlin as Perry's ex
- Clinton Leupp as Miss Coco Peru
- Missi Pyle as Actress with flowers

== Development ==
After college at UCLA, Schafer moved to New York City and attended the Broadcast Musical Inc. writer's workshop, where he got the idea to write Trick. Having written several musicals during college, Schafer initially wrote Trick as a musical called Gay Boy. He showed the work to his friend, actor Anthony Rapp, who suggested that he write it as a movie, instead. An actor involved with the script reading contacted Jim Fall, who eventually directed the film.

== Production ==
Independently produced, Trick was picked up for North American distribution by Fine Line Features soon after being screened at the Sundance Film Festival in January 1999. The "mid-six figure" deal guaranteed a theatrical release in at least three cities.

Filming was completed in less than three weeks in August 1998.

== Critical reception ==
On the review aggregator website Rotten Tomatoes, 77% of 22 critics' reviews are positive. The website's consensus reads: "By portraying its love story as nothing less than conventional, Trick avoids genre tropes to create a simple, effective romance."

Roger Ebert wrote, "The movie imposes a Doris Day story line on material that wants to be more sexual; it's about a character whose quasi-virginity is preserved through an improbable series of mishaps and coincidences." Janet Maslin of The New York Times commented, "Trick is a tenderhearted boy-meets-boy story that manages to incorporate the courtship-interruptus style of the Doris Day era into a Greenwich Village one-night stand."

In the years since its release, the film has been considered a gay cult classic.

== Soundtrack ==
1. "Dream Weaver" (Gary Wright) – Erin Hamilton
2. "Unspeakable Joy" (Kim English; Maurice Joshua) – Kim English
3. "Brand New Lover" (Alfred Hochstrasser; J. Parzen; Michael Momm) – Bibiche
4. "I Am Woman (Razor N' Guido Mix)" (Helen Reddy; Ray Burton) – Jessica Williams
5. "Someone to Hold" (Harvey L. Frierson, Jr.; Veronica) – Veronica
6. "Drama" (Peter Rauhofer) – Kim Cooper
7. "Maybe (Love'll Make Sense to Me)" (Jeff Krassner; S. Faber) – Jeff Krassner
8. "Enter You" (Jason Schafer) – Tori Spelling
9. "¿Como Te Gusta Mi Pinga?" (A. Chapman) – Steve Hayes
10. "I Am Woman* (Dance Mix)" (Helen Reddy; Ray Burton) – Jessica Williams
11. "Trick of Fate/Enter You (Finale) [Instrumental]" (Jason Schafer)
12. "Trick of Fate" (David Friedman) – Valerie Pinkston

== Awards ==
Year	Award	Festival	Category	Result
1999	Siegessäule Special Jury Teddy Award	Berlin International Film Festival	Feature film	Won
1999	Special Programming Committee Award	Outfest	Outstanding Emerging Talent – Jim Fall	Won
1999	Grand Jury Prize	Sundance Film Festival	Dramatic	Nominated
2000	Golden Satellite Award	4th Golden Satellite Awards	Best Supporting Actress – Musical or Comedy – Tori Spelling	Nominated

== Sequel ==
In a December 2012 AfterElton.com interview, director Fall stated that he and writer Schafer were in the early stages of developing a sequel to Trick. Fall said the film would take place 12 years after the first one, with main characters Gabriel and Mark — not having stayed together because they were "not really right for each other" — meeting again and falling in love as grown men in their 40s.

Fall announced in a non-public social media post in August 2018 that script for the sequel was completed and the project was moving forward, with Coco Peru attached to co-star. Scheduled for release in 2019, the film will be set in Los Angeles. Fall subsequently told Out that Campbell, Pitoc, Spelling, Beyer and Hayes would be reprising their roles in Trick 2. Other cast members announced in September 2018 include Guillermo Diaz, Jimmy Fowlie, Tara Karsian, Arne Gjelten, Joe Arellano, and Elizabeth Regensburger-Gonzalez.

Later, Fall put a message on his website stating "Sadly, Trick 2 is not happening".

== Musical adaptation ==
The film was adapted into a stage musical, titled Trick! The Musical, and debuted on May 1, 2025, at Out Front Theater Company in Atlanta, Georgia, with book and lyrics by Schafer, music by Arthur LaFrentz Bacon, and direction by Paul Conroy. The musical debuted as Out Front Theater's closing production of its ninth season, with a planned run until May 17.
