= Chairman of the Board (film) =

1998 comedy film directed by Alex Zamm

- Theatrical release poster
- Directed by: Alex Zamm
- Screenplay by: Al Septien; Turi Meyer; Alex Zamm
- Story by: Al Septien; Turi Meyer
- Produced by: Rupert Harvey; Peter M. Lenkov
- Starring: Carrot Top; Courtney Thorne-Smith; Larry Miller; Raquel Welch; Mystro Clark; M. Emmet Walsh; Jack Warden
- Cinematography: David Lewis
- Edited by: Jimmy Hill
- Music by: Chris Hajian
- Production companies: Trimark Pictures; 101st Street Films
- Distributed by: Trimark Pictures
- Release date: March 13, 1998
- Running time: 95 minutes
- Country: United States
- Language: English
- Budget: $7 million
- Box office: $306,715

Chairman of the Board is a 1998 American comedy film directed by Alex Zamm, and starring Carrot Top in his sole feature-length lead role. The plot follows a surfer and inventor named Edison as he inherits and runs a billionaire's company. It was poorly received by both critics and audiences and was a box office bomb. Both Carrot Top and Raquel Welch received Golden Raspberry Award nominations for their roles in the film.

== Plot ==
Edison is a poor, failed inventor and surf bum who has spent his rent money on another unsuccessful invention. Facing eviction from his short-tempered landlady Ms. Krubavitch, his roommates Ty and Zak insist he search for a job. After failing to make money at a variety of jobs, Edison soon runs into wealthy business magnate Armand McMillan, whose car has broken down on the side of the road. After Edison uses his inventions to assist Armand, the old man becomes impressed with his ingenuity, and the two go surfing together and quickly become friends.

Later, Edison receives a letter in the mail informing him that McMillan has passed away. In a pre-recorded message, McMillan reveals that he is leaving Edison 45% of the shares in his large invention corporation, McMillan Industries, while his nephew Bradford, his only living relative, is left only a surfboard as his sole inheritance. Edison has a successful tenure as the new chairman of the company. The jealous Bradford attempts to derail Edison's success, seemingly to no avail. Soon after going on a successful date with his co-worker Natalie Stockwell, Edison invents the company's most innovative product yet - "Chef Edison"-brand TV dinners that each have a built-in television. The product is a massive success, and consequently, Edison's wealth leads him to become more selfish.

However, the company takes a sudden blow when a customer publicly alleges that the TV dinners leak radiation, claiming that he has gotten radiation poisoning as a result, evidenced by his body glowing green. The company's stock plummets, and Bradford responds by taking over as chairman and planning to sell the company for millions, having Edison escorted out of the building by security. A distraught Edison returns home to find an eviction notice in front of his residence, and that his surfboard and other possessions have been repossessed. However, Edison comes across a canister of one of his previous inventions, a special, non-toxic glow-in-the-dark makeup called "Glo-Gunk", intended for late-night surfing. Realizing that radiation poisoning would cause sickness or death, but not literal glowing, Edison deduces that his formula for Glo-Gunk was stolen and that the radiation poisoning allegation was faked, and he immediately suspects Bradford. He, along with Ty and Zak, drive back to McMillan Industries headquarters to confront Bradford.

Edison bursts into the boardroom and accuses Bradford of stealing his Glo-Gunk formula and faking the radiation poisoning case to take control of the company, demonstrating the Glo-Gunk's effects to prove it. Bradford denies any wrongdoing, but is exposed when it is revealed he is wearing another of Edison's inventions, the "Bull-shirt" – a shirt with a built-in lie detector. As a result, Bradford is arrested, with executive Grace Kosik making a deal with the company to testify against him. With the company saved, Edison appoints Natalie, now his girlfriend, to run the company.

== Cast ==
- Carrot Top as Edison, an aspiring inventor and surf bum
- Courtney Thorne-Smith as Natalie Stockwell, Edison's co-worker and love interest
- Larry Miller as Bradford McMillan, an executive at McMillan Industries, Armand McMillan's nephew and sole living relative
- Raquel Welch as Grace Kosik, an executive at McMillan Industries
- Mystro Clark as Ty, one of Edison's roommates
- Jack Plotnick as Zak, one of Edison's roommates
- Jack Warden as Armand McMillan, the chairman of McMillan Industries who leaves the company to Edison when he dies
- Estelle Harris as Ms. Krubavitch, Edison's landlady
- Bill Erwin as Landers
- M. Emmet Walsh as Freemont
- Jack McGee as Harlan Granger
- Glenn Shadix as Larry
- Fred Stoller as Toby, McMillan Gate Guard
- Taylor Negron as Mr Withermeyer
- Jack Riley as the Condom Boss
- Rance Howard as Rev. Hatley
- Mark Kriski as a Newscaster
- Cindy Margolis as a Tennis Instructor
- Butterbean as a Museum Security Guard
- Little Richard as Himself

== Production ==
Phillip Goldfine, who served as senior VP of Trimark Pictures, was credited with greenlighting the film. The film was shot in Southern California, while Carrot Top was a native of Florida.

The film was famously mocked by comedian Norm Macdonald during a May 15, 1997 appearance on Late Night with Conan O'Brien. Macdonald and Courtney Thorne-Smith were both guests, and she promoted two projects: the season finale of the TV drama Melrose Place and Chairman of the Board. MacDonald heckled both Carrot Top and Chairman of the Board, and expressed incredulity at Thorne-Smith who he erroneously believed had left the successful Melrose Place to star in a film with Carrot Top. When O'Brien asked Thorne-Smith the name of the film, Macdonald interjected, "If it's got Carrot Top in it, do you know what a good name for it would be? Box Office Poison." After Thorne-Smith revealed the Chairman of the Board title, O'Brien challenged Macdonald to make fun of it; Macdonald immediately quipped, "I bet the 'Board' is spelled 'B-O-R-E-D!'" Macdonald said he apologized to Carrot Top the next day, saying he "felt kind of bad" about the jokes and had not considered the fact Carrot Top might have been watching the episode.

After MacDonald's death on September 14, 2021, Carrot Top did a tribute to him during a performance. Carrot Top referred to Macdonald as a "friend" and stated and his 1997 roast of Chairman of the Board was "great" before playing clips from the Conan episode on a screen for the audience.

Courtney Thorne-Smith also gave a tribute to Macdonald in a Vanity Fair interview after his death. She stated:

Every once in a while, I'll run into Conan and he'll apologize, and I say, "That was one of my favorite moments of my life." Teased by Norm Macdonald? Are you kidding? I did The Tonight Show once, and Don Rickles made fun of my father, and my father never stopped talking about it. This is my version of that.

I told a story about my father telling a joke at my sister's wedding, and then Don Rickles just went off on my father being crazy, and it was the high point of my father's life. That's how I felt when Norm teased me. It didn't even occur to me that it could possibly be negative. I was beside myself.

I was there to promote Chairman of the Board. I was not thrilled about having to do it, so when Norm took over, I'm like, Oh, thank you, God and Norm Macdonald. It was a blessing. Look—had I thought that Chairman of the Board was my path to an Oscar, I might have been offended. I did not. So it was a joy to be teased about it. Because I didn't know what I was going to say [on the show]. I was like, good, Norm, you take over.

== Reception ==
Chairman of the Board received negative reviews. On Rotten Tomatoes, it has an approval rating of 11% based on reviews from 9 critics.

David Kronke of the Los Angeles Times referred to the film as "a standard-issue rags-to-riches plot, enlivened by only by a tchotchke-heavy production design that might engage those entranced by bright, shiny objects", and compared the film to "Good Burger, but with French tickler jokes." Jay Boyar trashed the film in the Orlando Sentinel, giving the film just one star and saying it "makes Adam Sandler look like Noël Coward". Lisa Schwarzbaum of Entertainment Weekly gave the film a D−. In The New York Times, Anita Gates described Carrot Top as "without an atom of charm" but she did praise Thorne-Smith for an "admirable performance" in seeming genuinely smitten by Carrot Top's character.

Carrot Top was nominated for Worst New Star, and Raquel Welch was nominated for Worst Supporting Actress at the 1998 Golden Raspberry Awards.
