= Shawn Thompson =

Canadian actor, screenwriter and director

- Born: Shawn Alex Thompson; January 13, 1958 (age 68); Berwick, Nova Scotia
- Occupations: Actor; Screenwriter; Producer; Director
- Years active: 1985–present

Shawn Alex Thompson (born January 13, 1958) is a Canadian actor, screenwriter, television producer, and television director, as well as a professional magician. Notably, he is one of the producers of Puppets Who Kill, which aired on Canada's The Comedy Network.

Thompson was born in Berwick, Nova Scotia. Thompson's first foray into showbiz came as a magician and circus performer, dangling by his ankles from a burning rope while struggling to escape from a straight jacket. Thompson migrated into stand-up comedy, first taking a stance at Yuk Yuks, alongside prominent actor Jim Carrey. During this time, Thompson guest hosted eleven times on The Late Show Starring Joan Rivers for Fox Television. Also on Fox, Thompson became a series regular on the sketch comedy series The Newz, where he also wrote and directed several short films. From December 1985 to April 1987, Thompson was cast as Simon Hall, a fictional character on the CBS series Guiding Light, his first daytime role.

Simultaneously during this period, Thompson also hosted the Toronto regional edition of the CBC Television teen-oriented weekend talk/variety show Switchback, as well as appearing alongside Howard Busgang in the short-run comedy series We Don't Knock, in which Busgang and Thompson performed improvised pranks on real people. In 1985 Thompson was arrested in the United States for illegal dumping after throwing a doll over Niagara Falls as part of a Switchback stunt.

In 1988, he played dance television host Corny Collins in John Waters' film Hairspray. He has directed episodes of the series Puppets Who Kill, winning a Canadian Comedy Award for Best Director in 2003, and a Gemini Award for Best Direction in 2004. Furthermore, in 1995, Thompson wrote episodes for MGM's The Outer Limits, one of which episodes included a young Josh Brolin.

Recently, he directed shows such as The Next Step and Murdoch Mysteries, and played the recurring role of Gus McIlroy on the BBC Kids show My Perfect Landing (2020).

== Filmography ==
Shawn Thompson film and television acting credits
Year	Title	Role	Notes	Ref.
1985	Workin' for Peanuts	Rick	Television film	
1985	Head Office	Trevor Koback	Theatrical film	
1985–1987	Guiding Light	Simon Hall	22 episodes	
1988	Hairspray	Corny Collins	Theatrical film	
1990	Hunter	Matson	1 episode	
1991	Guilty as Charged	Gary	Theatrical film	
1993	Counterstrike	Charles Renfrew	Episode: "Free to Kill"	
1994	Sleeping with Strangers	Mark	Theatrical film	
1994	Heads	Clay Cox	Television film	
1994	The Newz	(various)		
1997	Borrowed Hearts	Dave Hebert	Television film	
1998	Shadow Builder	Sheriff Sam Logan	Theatrical film	
2002, 2005	Puppets Who Kill	Mr. Skittle	2 episodes	
2020	My Perfect Landing	Gus McIlroy	15 episodes	
