= Nick and Jane =

- Theatrical release poster
- Directed by: Richard Mauro
- Written by: Richard Mauro; Neil Alumkal
- Story by: Richard Mauro; Peter Quigley
- Produced by: Adrian Agramonte; Bill McCutchen
- Starring: Dana Wheeler-Nicholson; James McCaffrey; David Johansen; Miss Coco Peru; Gedde Watanabe
- Cinematography: Chris Norr
- Edited by: Richard Mauro; Wendey Stanzler
- Music by: Mark Suozzo
- Distributed by: Avalanche Releasing
- Release date: November 14, 1997
- Running time: 93 minutes
- Country: United States
- Language: English

Nick and Jane is a 1997 American romantic comedy film directed by Richard Mauro and starring Dana Wheeler-Nicholson, James McCaffrey, David Johansen, Miss Coco Peru and Gedde Watanabe.

== Cast ==
- Dana Wheeler-Nicholson as Jane
- James McCaffrey as Nick
- John Dossett as John
- LisaGay Hamilton as Vickie
- David Johansen as Carter
- Gedde Watanabe as Enzo
- Miss Coco Peru as Miss Coco
- Dianne Brill as Celine
- Saundra Santiago as Stephanie
- George Coe as Mr. Morgan
- Siobhan Fallon Hogan as Julie

== Reception ==
Roger Ebert awarded the film one and a half stars.
