= Storm Catcher =

- Promotional release poster
- Directed by: Tony Hickox
- Written by: Bill Gucwa; Ed Masterson
- Produced by: Tracee Stanley
- Starring: Dolph Lundgren; Mystro Clark; John Pennell; Robert Miano
- Cinematography: David Bridges
- Edited by: Brett Hedlund
- Music by: David Wurst; Eric Wurst
- Production company: Phoenician Entertainment
- Distributed by: Franchise Pictures; Phoenician Entertainment; Stormy Productions
- Release date: September 10, 1999
- Running time: 95 minutes
- Country: United States
- Language: English

Storm Catcher is a 1999 American action film starring Dolph Lundgren and directed by co-star Tony Hickox. New Zealand model and actress Kylie Bax debuted as Jessica Holloway. The film tells the story of a renegade general who plans to bomb Washington, D.C., with a new stealth fighter. Storm Catcher was first released on HBO and then direct-to-video.

== Plot ==
Flanked by buddy Sparks Johnson on the ground and co-pilot Lucas in the air, Major Jack Holloway flies America's top secret "Phoenix" stealth-capable fighter jet. While Holloway's mentor, General William Jacobs, keeps FBI agents Lock and Load from snooping into his pet project, Holloway and Sparks enjoy some R&R with Holloway's wife Jessica and daughter Nicole.

It turns out Lucas is an operative for the "Serpent Killers", an intra-military right-wing group, and temporarily assuming Holloway's identity, he steals the Phoenix. Holloway is accused of the murders of the guards who protected the aircraft. Branded a pariah, Holloway is court martialed and nearly killed when his prison transport is ambushed and blown up.

Determined to clear his name, Holloway escapes. After he touches base with his family, extremist soldiers shoot Jessica and later kidnap Nicole. No sooner does Sparks convince Lock and Load of Holloway's innocence than Lucas guns them down and kidnaps Sparks. However, Jacobs tells Holloway that if he ever wants to see Nicole alive again, Holloway must bomb the White House.

== Cast ==
- Dolph Lundgren as Major Jack Holloway
- Mystro Clark as Captain "Sparks" Johnson
- John Pennell as Captain Lucas
- Robert Miano as General William Jacobs
- Yvonne Zima as Nicole Holloway
- Kylie Bax as Jessica Holloway
- Jody Jones as Sergeant McGarry
- Robert Glen Keith as Sergeant Trey Stanley
- Tony Hickox as FBI Agent Load
- Kimberley Davies as FBI Agent Lock
- Rudy Mettia as Commando
- Burt Goodman as Old Guy
- Richard Bjork as Bubba Pickles
- Andreea Radutoiu as Havens
- Phil Culotta as Commando #1
- Mark Delasandro as Commando #2

== Production ==
=== Filming ===
Storm Catcher is set and filmed primarily in Los Angeles, California with B-roll footage in Washington, D.C., taking place in 18 days from October 19 to November 6, 1998. The Phoenix aircraft used for filming, relying mostly on stock shots, was the Lockheed F-117 Nighthawk stealth fighter aircraft. The McDonnell Douglas F-15 Eagle pictured on the film's movie poster (designed for pre-sales and financing before being produced or having a finished script) was never seen in the film. The other main aerial adversary in the film was the Grumman F-14 Tomcat.

== Release ==
=== Home media ===
Storm Catcher premiered on HBO before landing on VHS and DVD. It was released on January 4, 2000, by Columbia TriStar Home Video.

== Reception ==
=== Critical response ===
Although not critically reviewed in major media outlets, the film did garner some attention from other film reviewers. David Parkinson of Radio Times rated Storm Catcher, 1 out of 5 stars and wrote, "Faced with a minuscule budget, a few feet of stock aerial footage and a script with dialogue that amounts to an aural assault, director Anthony Hickox has done well to produce a film that's only as bad as this one." Robert Pardi of TV Guide rated it 2 out of 5 stars and wrote, "As action fodder goes, this Lundgren vehicle benefits from solid wild blue yonder photography and enthusiastically executed assault sequences. As the bombs fall on familiar terrain and the fists smash into standard-issue bad guys, however, the landscape fills with deja-vu."

== See also ==
- List of American films of 1999
