= Jack Plotnick =

American actor, writer, and producer

- Born: October 30, 1968 (age 57); Worthington, Ohio, U.S.
- Education: Carnegie Mellon University (BFA)
- Occupations: Actor; writer; producer
- Years active: 1995–present

Jack Plotnick is an American film and television actor, writer, and producer. Notable main television roles include Lovespring International, Drawn Together, and Action. Notable film roles include Gods and Monsters, Sleeping Dogs Lie, Rubber, and Wrong.

== Career ==
Plotnick is known for his role as Edmund Kay in the 1998 period drama Gods and Monsters, which won an Academy Award for Best Adapted Screenplay, and recurring roles on the television series Ellen and Buffy the Vampire Slayer, his role as part of the main cast of Drawn Together, his leading performance in the film Wrong and his drag persona, "Evie Harris" in Girls Will Be Girls. He had a recurring role on The Mentalist as crime scene technician Brett Partridge. Plotnick directed and co-wrote the 2014 science fiction comedy Space Station 76.

== Personal life ==
Plotnick was born in Worthington, Ohio, the youngest of four children, and graduated from Worthington High School in 1987. He attended Carnegie Mellon University. Plotnick was raised Jewish, and is gay.

== Awards ==
Along with co-stars Miss Coco Peru and Varla Jean Merman, Plotnick shared the Best Actor Grand Jury Award at Outfest 2003 and "Best Actress" honors at the 2003 U.S. Comedy Arts Festival for his role in Girls Will Be Girls.

== Filmography ==
=== Television ===
- Ellen — Barrett (12 episodes, 1995-1998)
- The Wayans Bros. — Ted (2 episodes, 1997)
- The Weird Al Show — Uncle Ralphie (2 episodes, 1997)
- The Jenny McCarthy Show — himself (22 episodes, 1997)
- Buffy the Vampire Slayer — Deputy Mayor Allan Finch (4 episodes, 1998-1999)
- Rude Awakening — Clark (9 episodes, 1999-2000)
- Action — Stuart Glazer (13 episodes, 1999-2000)
- Reno 911! — Various (15 episodes, 2003-2022)
- Joan of Arcadia — Sammy No. 2 (4 episodes, 2004-2005)
- Drawn Together — Xandir P. Whifflebottom (36 episodes, 2004-2007)
- Lovespring International — Steve Morris (13 episodes, 2006), also producer of 2 episodes
- Svetlana — Ted (3 episodes, 2010-2011)
- The Mentalist — Brett Partridge (5 episodes, 2008-2013)
- Z Nation — Roman Estes (6 episodes, 2018)
- Grace and Frankie — Paul (8 episodes, 2017-2022)

=== Film ===
- Gods and Monsters (1998) — Edmund Kay
- Chairman of the Board (1998) — Zak
- Down with Love (2003) — Maurice
- Girls Will Be Girls (2003) — Evie Harris
- Straight-Jacket (2004) — Freddie Stevens
- Adam & Steve (2005) — Mime
- Sleeping Dogs Lie (2006) — Dougie
- The Drawn Together Movie: The Movie! (2010) — Xandir
- Rubber (2010) — Accountant
- Sharpay's Fabulous Adventure (2011) — Neil Roberts
- Wrong (2012) — Dolph Springer
- Patient Seven (2016) — Dr. Paul Victor
- Loves Company (2026) - Blake De Troy

=== Web series ===
- Helluva Boss - Musical announcer/Yogirt
- Helluva Shorts - Mr. Wrigglers

== Other work ==
Plotnick performed in the July 2012 edition of Don't Tell My Mother! (Live Storytelling), a monthly showcase in which actors, authors, screenwriters and comedians share true stories they would never want their mothers to know.

In 2015 he released the e-book New Thoughts for Actors which he offers for free, writing "I wrote it as a way to give back to my community."

Starting 2018, he has made appearances in Brandon Rogers' videos, starting with a cameo in A Day at the Beach as Lyle Lemon. The video is currently on YouTube and has over 24 million views. He was also featured in Brandon Rodgers' "North Pole Complaints (Offensive)" as Tiny Toni. As of right now, the video has 1.1 million views. In 2019, he made a cameo as Coach Best in Brandon Rogers' Blame the Hero episode 3 and 7, and in 2022, starred as Mr. Stencil in Normal British Series.

Jack produces and stars in satirical videos inserting himself into old Wonderful World of Disney footage.
