= Girls Will Be Girls (2003 film) =

- Girls Will Be Girls film poster
- Directed by: Richard Day
- Written by: Richard Day
- Starring: Jack Plotnick; Clinton Leupp; Jeffery Roberson
- Cinematography: Nicholas Hutak
- Edited by: Chris Conlee
- Music by: Stephen Edwards
- Distributed by: IFC Films
- Release date: January 17, 2003 (Premiere)
- Running time: 79 minutes
- Country: United States
- Language: English

Girls Will Be Girls is a 2003 comedy film written and directed by Richard Day. Starring Jack Plotnick, Clinton Leupp, and Jeffery Roberson as three actresses at various places in their careers, the film is a parody of Hollywood-related movies such as Sunset Boulevard, All About Eve, What Ever Happened to Baby Jane?, Mommie Dearest, and Valley of the Dolls.

== Plot ==
Evie Harris (Jack Plotnick) is a washed-up, alcoholic, aging C-List actress (star of kinetoscope, stage, television, and film in such works as the TV special Christmas Evie, vaudeville-era appearances promoting Dr. Vim's Miracle Elixir, Court TV: Celebrities Who Kill, Tabitha, and the sad 1970s disaster epic Asteroid [tagline: "Earth Might Get Crushed!"]). She lives in a tackily out-of-style bungalow with Coco (Clinton Leupp), a homely, lonely, doormat of a spinster who carries a torch for the handsome young doctor who performed her abortion years ago.

Evie's life is turned upside down by the arrival of a new roommate, Varla Simonds (Jeffery Roberson), the voracious, starry-eyed daughter of Evie's rival, late actress Marla Simonds (whose claims to fame included playing Chesty on Fill Her Up, the short-lived but widely acclaimed spin-off of C.P.O. Sharkey, and almost being cast as the lead in Asteroid before Evie captured that "breakout" role). Evie acts very competitively around Varla, especially as she recognizes the growing chemistry between the young up-and-comer and her sweet, handsome and microscopically endowed son and "ambulance chasing" lawyer, Stevie (Ron Mathews). When Varla snags a plum starring role in commercials for Bizzy Gal dinners, tensions and jealousies among the three women reach a boiling point and treachery soon rears its ugly head.

== Cast ==
- Jack Plotnick as Evie Harris
- Clinton Leupp as Coco Peru
- Jeffery Roberson as Varla Simonds/Marla Simonds
- Ron Mathews as Stevie Harris
- Eric Stonestreet as Dr. Benson
- Hamilton von Watts as Laurent
- Dana Gould as Jeff
- Chad Lindsey as Dr. Perfect
- Sam Pancake as Brad

== Production ==
In a 2008 interview, Leupp said that the origin of the film was a drag event benefit co-hosted by Plotnick and himself. Leupp noted, "we were such a hit that everyone said we should do something else together. Out of that we created Girls Will Be Girls. We decided we needed that third person — the formula is Varla makes Evie crazy, Evie starts acting out and ends up hurting Coco." He went on to say that Day had originally written the movie as a situation comedy for Showtime, but the network had passed on it at the last minute, so it was made as a film "hoping that the new gay networks would be interested."

== Awards and nominations ==
The three leads shared the Best Actor Grand Jury Award at Outfest 2003 and "Best Actress" honors at the 2003 U.S. Comedy Arts Festival.

== Home media ==
Girls Will Be Girls was released on Region 1 DVD on March 16, 2004. The film was remastered and re-released to digital platforms on June 1, 2021.

== Internet series ==
A spin-off web series starring Plotnick, Leupp, and Roberson appeared on YouTube on December 6, 2007, starting with the holiday sketch, "Christmas Evie", featuring Tom Lenk.

The first official episode of the internet shorts, "The Jizz Party" premiered on December 21, 2007. The series continues the story of the three women after the events of the film. Coco has divorced her husband and moved back in with Evie, and is going through life as a single mother. Early in the series, Varla is experiencing a backlash of fame: she is being stalked by someone she considers undesirable.

Episodes:

- The Jizz Party (December 21, 2007) – featuring Jay Johnston as Bill
- Delivering Coco Part I (February 5, 2008) – featuring Scott Thompson as Coco's mother
- Delivering Coco Part II (March 14, 2008) – featuring Scott Thompson as Coco's mother
- Girl Stalk, Part I (March 27, 2008)
- Girl Stalk, Part II (June 2, 2008) – noted as being the season finale

"Girl Stalk" was re-edited and featured on YouTube in six smaller parts; however, there is no additional content.

== Sequel ==
A sequel, Girls Will Be Girls 2012, was filmed in 2012, funded by a Kickstarter campaign. A Tumblr page was created to document the progress of the film. In a 2015 blog post, Richard Day disclosed a recent diagnosis of cancer, which delayed production. In 2016, Coco Peru and Varla Jean Merman were quoted as saying the film would be released "eventually." As of 2024, the film remains unfinished and unreleased. Day began releasing clips of the film every week on Instagram and TikTok in September 2025.
