= Miss Coco Peru =

American drag queen

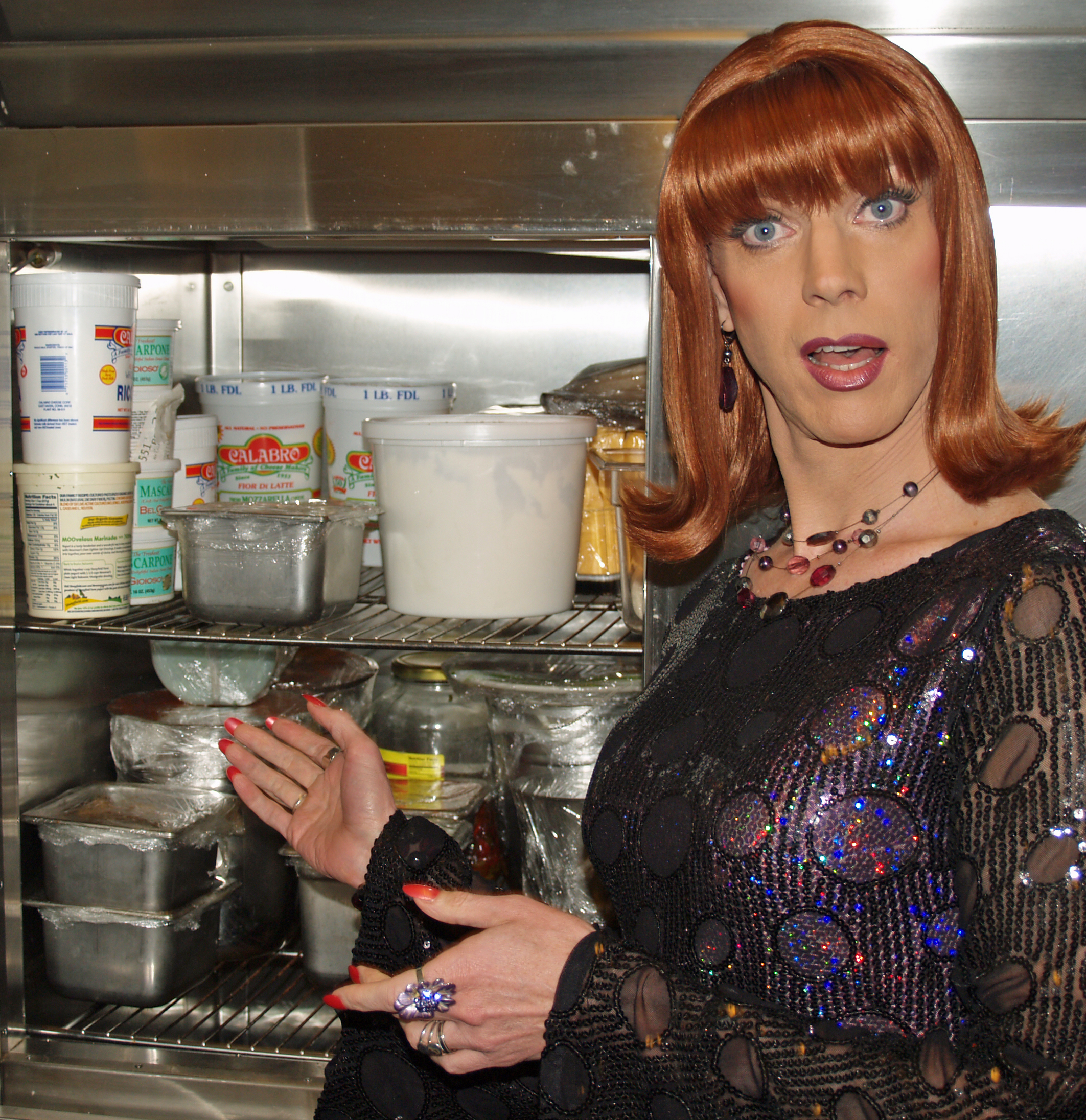
- Coco Peru backstage at The Public Theater in New York City.
- Born: Clinton Leupp; August 27, 1965 (age 61); City Island, Bronx, New York, U.S.
- Occupations: Drag performer; actor; YouTuber
- Years active: 1991–present
- Spouse: Rafael Arias (m. 2006)
- Website: misscocoperu.com

Coco Peru (interviewed by David Shankbone) talks about how to make a rough life funny.

Miss Coco Peru (born August 27, 1965) is the drag persona of American actor, comedian and drag performer Clinton Leupp, known for her role in the 1999 independent film Trick and for her series of live theater performances. Recognizable by her "trademark copper-toned flip hairdo", Peru also starred in Richard Day's Girls Will Be Girls (2003) and was one of six performers featured in the Logo original stand-up comedy series Wisecrack (2005). She has also appeared in a number of other supporting and guest-starring roles in film and television.

For 30 years, Peru has starred in various "one-woman shows" across the US and other countries, and hosted LGBT events. Since 2005, Peru has appeared in the "Conversations with Coco" series in which she "interviews and celebrates the lives and careers of the LGBT community's favorite icons." Peru's guests have included Bea Arthur, Liza Minnelli, Lesley Ann Warren, Karen Black, Lily Tomlin and Jane Fonda.

== Early life and the creation of Coco ==
Leupp was born in City Island, New York. He was raised Catholic and attended the Catholic Cardinal Spellman High School. He studied theatre at Adelphi University. Calling himself "a gay guy who was never going to be passing for straight", he said that he had just started college when homophobic slurs were directed at him. "Here we go again, I thought; I was so used to it, in high school. But by the end of those four years, I had become very popular, by just being myself, and being relatable."

Leupp calls Robin Williams, Whoopi Goldberg and Bette Midler some of his early idols. In a 2012 interview he said, "When I was younger, I looked up to people who were like Bette Midler and Lily Tomlin, people who created characters and got discovered that way. I always knew early on that I was gay and I wanted to be an openly gay performer. Back when I started, that was pretty rare. I was trained in the theater and I went to college for theater, and I decided to do drag as a way to express myself both in theater and as an activist. I always find that people who are able to do all of that an inspiration. I feel like Lily Tomlin and Bette Midler, early on, did that. ... [Midler] started in the bathhouses and gay men wrote her material. Of course she had the performance style to pull it off, but she also had gay men writing for her. That's why her voice had that gay sensibility." He decided "it was probably best for me to be openly gay on stage, and create my own character. I did a one-person show early on as myself ... All my friends came, and loved it; I was always considered funny. But I knew it wasn't going to be enough." Leupp recalled thinking, "How do I change people's minds, those who might not have a clear picture of who gay people were?" He said, "Coco came about at a time in my life when I didn't have much direction ... I realized I had to do something that made me unique ... I read a book about Native Americans 'two spirits,' which were men who dressed as women or partially as women who were often seen as the shaman or the storytellers in their communities." "Wouldn't it be great if I did something in drag, I decided, where people perceive you as a drag queen in a way, but as I tell the story — my story — they would forget I'm a drag queen and just relate to the story. This is what I had in mind when I started writing my first drag show."

"So I put all those things together: I'm a drag queen/two spirit/gay activist/entertainer. And everything fell into place. It was really a magical time in my life," Leupp said. To find Coco's signature hairdo, he tried blonde and black wigs but thought they looked terrible; when he tried red, Leupp said "that's the color." "My first hairdo was very Tina Louise/Gilligan's Island — very big. It evolved into the straight with flip going under, then I tried it with the flip going out — and I said, 'That's Coco.' Other drag queens have chided me for not changing my hairdo, but I just feel it is so much part of the persona and so recognizable, I don't want to change it." Leupp said his parents were very supportive, "But when I did do drag for the first time I had already done a one-person show about being gay. When I did that they were terrified — they thought I was going to have things thrown at me. But when I got applause, they realized there's a big world out there that they didn't know about. So when I decided to do drag, they were nervous, but hid it. And I think they were happy that I was received with such love when they expected me to be greeted with tomatoes."

Leupp later "realized the potential of drag as full-blown theater" through the work of playwright and drag performer Charles Busch.

== Career ==
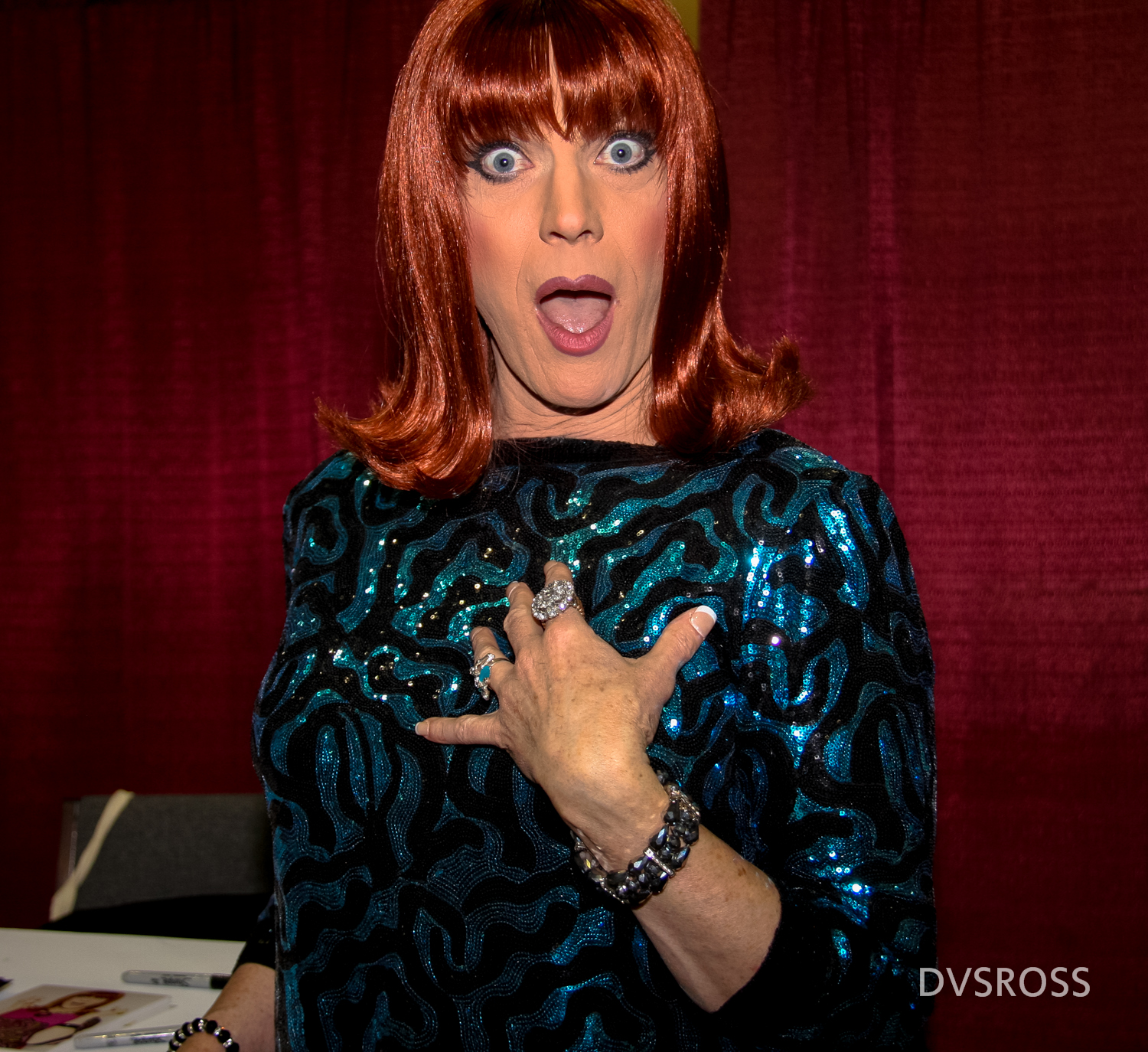
Miss Coco Peru at RuPaul's DragCon 2017

Leupp's first one-person show was Miss Coco Peru in My Goddamn Cabaret in 1992. Several more Coco Peru shows followed, as well as a 1994 guest role on New York Undercover and appearances in both Wigstock: The Movie and To Wong Foo Thanks for Everything, Julie Newmar in 1995. Peru next had a role in the 1997 romantic comedy Nick and Jane. Her follow-up was the 1999 independent film Trick. According to Peru, Trick director Jim Fall was a friend and fan, and five years before the film was shot she helped him audition actors by reading the role which ultimately went to Tori Spelling. Peru's role in the film was added specifically for her: "They wrote me a part, which I rewrote using my own experiences. I wrote that line 'It burns.' Most of the part was written by me, which is why I played it so well."

Peru later starred in Richard Day's Girls Will Be Girls (2003) and was one of six performers featured in the Logo original stand-up comedy series Wisecrack (2005). She has appeared in a number of other supporting and guest-starring roles in television and film, including Will & Grace in 2001 and again in 2018 and 2019, Arrested Development in 2005 and Twins in 2006; the Bravo reality series Boy Meets Boy (2003) and Welcome to the Parker (2007); the police procedural drama series Detroit 1-8-7 in 2011; the 2004 comedy film Straight-Jacket; and a 2007–2008 web series follow-up to Girls Will Be Girls. Peru performed the voice of "Mama Hippo" in the 2006 Disney animated feature The Wild, and later was the voice of Mother Morally Superior in a 2008 episode of the Logo stop motion animated series Rick & Steve: The Happiest Gay Couple in All the World. In 2004 Peru appeared in an Orbitz TV commercial that was later nominated for a GLAAD Media Award.

In 2008 Leupp said,

"I'm not impersonating a woman. It's just an extension of me. I'm telling autobiographical stories, and Coco gives me the freedom to be a little more outrageous and say things I wouldn't say in everyday life ... Drag allows me to embrace a lot of the things I hated about myself growing up ... Having been called a girl-boy and all that, drag is a way of saying, I'm going to embrace everything that anybody said about me, and put it out there on stage. People have said I shouldn't call myself a drag queen, that I do a disservice to myself. My reaction is I'm proud to be what I am. When I see video footage of Stonewall, I am proud to be a part of that history. I'm not saying that I am historical, but just being out there doing the drag, on television, in movies ... I have young nephews ... who know Coco, and who think it's great that I dress up as a girl. In this way, I am changing the world."

== Personal life ==
Leupp knew he was gay at an early age. He met his husband Rafael Arias, a college professor originally from Spain, around 1995. In 2006, they married in Spain, where same-sex marriage was legal at a time before it was in the United States.

Leupp identifies as Episcopalian.

== Activism ==
Leupp stated in an October 2012 interview that as a young gay man he "decided to do drag as a way to express myself both in theater and as an activist." "With friends who were sick, and dying of HIV/AIDS," he said in 2008, "I wanted to be an activist as well as an entertainer."

In a 2008 interview, Leupp said that when Showtime passed on the Girls Will Be Girls concept as a situation comedy, it was instead produced as a film "hoping that the new gay networks would be interested." They were not, about which Leupp commented, "I think that drag is scary, even in our own community. They would rather play it safe. People want to be really politically correct, which I think is very dangerous. I've heard from various people in the business that these stations are appealing to Middle America, and I find that very disturbing because I always felt that we as gay people were the leaders — we decided what was funny, what was hot in fashion. Now we are trying to figure out what Middle America accepts. I'm not interested in that. I'm not trying to appeal to Middle America, and that gay people are doing so only makes me angry."

When asked what he was most proud of among Peru's many awards and recognitions, Leupp as Peru said in 2010, "I love when I get feedback from young gay people who tell me that my show or appearances on Logo helped them in a positive way to deal with their own identity. Recently, a young guy came up to me in Provincetown after my show and said, 'I love your anger. We're not angry enough and you inspired me.' I was in heaven!"

In November 2013, Leupp made headlines when he publicly protested the booking of a retired priest involved in reparative therapy to speak at Leupp's former high school, Cardinal Spellman Catholic in the Bronx. According to the school, Father Donald Timone would speak to parents about Catholic groups intended to convince children "struggling with same-sex attraction" to live "chaste lives through participation in support groups." Leupp said of the programs, "It makes it look like it's a support group, but once you really see what they are doing it's disturbing ... They are trying to shame these kids!" After further controversy over the issue among the school, alumni, gay activists and anti-gay activists, Timone's appearance was postponed until further notice but not officially cancelled.

== Live performances ==
Peru's live shows have been performed throughout the United States and abroad, and she has earned numerous nominations and awards.

- 1992 Miss Coco Peru in My Goddamn Cabaret (1992 MAC Award nomination)
- 1992 Miss Coco Peru: A Legend in Progress (1993 MAC Award win and Backstage Bistro Award win)
- 1995 Miss Coco Peru at the Westbeth Theatre (1995 MAC Award nomination)
- 1998 Miss Coco Peru's Liquid Universe (1998 GLAAD Media Award nomination)
- 1999 Miss Coco Peru's Universe (1999 GLAAD Media Award nomination)
- 2001 Miss Coco Peru's Glorious Wounds ... She's Damaged (2001 GLAAD Media Award nomination)
- 2004–2005 Miss Coco Peru Is Undaunted! (New Conservatory Theater, San Francisco) (2004 GLAAD Media Award win, Ovation Award nomination); 2009 (Laurie Beechman Theatre, NYC)
- 2007 Ugly Coco
- 2010 Miss Coco Peru Is Still Alive! (Laurie Beechman Theatre, NYC)
- 2011 Miss Coco Peru: There Comes a Time (Laurie Beechman Theatre, NYC)
- 2012–present Miss Coco Peru: She's Got Balls (Laurie Beechman Theatre, NYC; Renberg Theater, Los Angeles; Castro Theatre, San Francisco; etc.)

=== "Conversations with Coco" ===
Since 2005 Peru has appeared in the "Conversations with Coco" series of live celebrity interviews, most of which have taken place at the Renberg Theater at the Los Angeles LGBT Center. The events feature multimedia presentations of the guests' career highlights combined with a conversational interview by Peru. In 2012 Peru said that she started doing "Conversations" after being interviewed herself; with the host departing, the Center asked if she would like to continue the series. She agreed, inviting her friend Bea Arthur as her first guest. Peru's 2014 interview with Liza Minnelli raised $45,000 for the LA Gay & Lesbian Center.

- Bea Arthur (January 22, 2005)
- Lainie Kazan (November 12, 2005)
- Charles Busch (April 7, 2006)
- Lily Tomlin (April 3, 2010)
- Karen Black (October 23, 2010)
- Lesley Ann Warren (February 14, 2011) - Castro Theatre, San Francisco
- Jane Fonda (April 20, 2013) - Renberg Theater
- Liza Minnelli (March 20, 2014) - Renberg Theater
- Allison Janney (March 7, 2015) - Renberg Theater

== Filmography ==
Television and film
Year	Project	Role	Notes	Ref
1994	New York Undercover	Lucille	TV series/Episode: "Blondes Have More Fun"	
1995	To Wong Foo Thanks for Everything, Julie Newmar	Miss Coco Peru	Film	
1995	Wigstock: The Movie	Self/Miss Coco Peru	Documentary	
1997	Nick and Jane	Miss Coco	Film	
1999	Trick	Miss Coco Peru	Film (credited as Clinton Leupp)	
1999	Rude Awakening	Director	TV series/Episode: "Slackula"	
2001	Will & Grace	Lawrence	TV series/Episode: "Moveable Feast"	
2003	Girls Will Be Girls	Coco	Film	
2003	Boy Meets Boy	Miss Coco Peru	TV series/Episode 1.3	
2004	Straight-Jacket	Bernice Ornstein	Film	
2005	Arrested Development	Coco	TV series/Episode: "For British Eyes Only"	
2005	Wisecrack	Self/Miss Coco Peru	TV series/Episode 1.3: "Miss Coco Peru"	
2005	Sissy Frenchfry	Head Administrator	Short	
2006	The Wild	Mama Hippo (voice)	Film (credited as Clinton Leupp)	
2006	Twins	Coco	TV series/Episode: "Dancin' & Pantsin'"	
2007	Welcome to the Parker	Self/Miss Coco Peru	TV series/Episode 1.3: "Drag Queens and a Drama Queen"	
2007	Girls Will Be Girls: The Jizz Party	Coco	Web series short	
2008	Girls Will Be Girls: Delivering Coco Part I	Coco	Web series short	
2008	Girls Will Be Girls: Delivering Coco Part II	Coco	Web series short	
2008	Girls Will Be Girls: Girl Stalk Part I	Coco	Web series short	
2008	Girls Will Be Girls: Girl Stalk Part II	Coco	Web series short	
2008	Rick & Steve: The Happiest Gay Couple in All the World	Mother Morally Superior (voice)	TV series/Episode: "Death of a Lesbian Bed"	
2008	Tranny McGuyver	Coco Peru	Short film	
2010	One Night Stand Up	Miss Coco Peru	TV series/Episode: "Dragtastic"	
2010	How I Met Your Mother	Drag Queen	TV series/Episode: "Architect of Destruction"	
2011	Detroit 1-8-7	Cherry Pop/Jacob Parker	TV series/Episode: "Legacy/Drag City"	
2012	Watch What Happens Live	Self/Coco Peru (Bartender)	TV series/Episode: "Lauren Conrad & LuAnn de Lesseps"	
2012	Love & Other Mishaps	Dance Instructor	TV series/Episode: "The Workout Partner"	
2012	Family Restaurant	Lynn	Short film	
2015	Hey Qween!	Coco	Web series	
2017	Dragula	Self/Guest judge	Season 2, Episode 5: "Scream Queens"	
2018–2020	Will & Grace	Self/Miss Coco Peru	TV series/Episodes: "Grace's Secret", "Jack's Big Gay Wedding", "What a Dump"	
2018	The Browns	Herself	Guest appearance	
2022	Dead End: Paranormal Park	Pauline Phoenix	Netflix original animated series	

== Reviews ==
Edge Boston called Coco Peru "one of the most recognizable figures of the New York drag scene and beyond." In a review of Miss Coco Peru is Undaunted! the Los Angeles Times wrote that the show "details how often Miss Coco has straddled the divide between saint and sinner, ladylike sweetness and stevedore crassness ... Miss Coco sings, sasses, and tells stories, usually about her own past. Wry and uncensored, the show is a hilarious exorcism, with music, no less."

== Awards ==
- 1993: MAC Award and Backstage Bistro Award for Miss Coco Peru: A Legend in Progress
- 2003: Along with co-stars Jack Plotnick and Varla Jean Merman, Leupp shared the Best Actor Grand Jury Award at 2003 Outfest and "Best Actress" honors at the 2003 U.S. Comedy Arts Festival for his role in Girls Will Be Girls
- 2004: GLAAD Media Award for Outstanding Los Angeles Theatre, Miss Coco Peru is Undaunted!
- 2009: Miss Coco Peru hosted the 20th Annual GLAAD Media Awards ceremony at the Nokia Theatre L.A. Live in Los Angeles, April 18, 2009.
