= Alfred Hochstrasser =

American composer and producer

Alfred Hochstrasser is a Romanian/Banat-born, German-raised composer and music record producer based in New York City. He is the Executive Producer and Owner of Music Beast, a music production company in Manhattan specializing in original music for advertising, and has worked with artists including Britney Spears, Smokey Robinson, Cyndi Lauper, Celia Cruz and The Black Eyed Peas. Hochstrasser's work has also been used in television and film.

His music has been featured in advertisements for Coca-Cola, McDonald's, Ford, Hugo Boss, Godiva and Hasbro, among others. Hochstrasser received an award for Excellence in Musical Composition from the Association of Independent Commercial Producers for his work with Tanqueray in 2006, and was invited to compose music for director David LaChapelle's advertisement for Passionata featuring Isabeli Fontana in 2007. Hochstrasser also composed music for the 1999 film Trick, which appeared in the Sundance and Berlin film festivals that same year. His songs and underscoring for a live theatrical production of "The Jungle Book" have been performed around Germany.

Hochstrasser served as the music producer for Tokyo Disney Resort's theme music in 2011 and as Music Producer/Composer in 2012. Hochstrasser has received mention in articles about modern music production for visuals in publications including Billboard Magazine, The Wall Street Journal, The New York Times and SHOOT magazine, and was interviewed for the book Who Killed the Jingle? How a Unique American Art Form Disappeared by Steve Karmen.

Hochstrasser is a graduate of Berklee College of Music, where he majored in film scoring.
