= Jim Fall =

American film and television director and producer

- Born: December 13, 1962 (age 63); Albion, New York, US
- Education: Temple University; New York University
- Occupations: Director and producer
- Years active: 1999–present
- Website: Official site

James Fall (born December 13, 1962) is an American film and television director and film producer. He is best known as the director of Trick (1999) and The Lizzie McGuire Movie (2003).

== Career ==
Fall's directorial debut was the 1999 gay-themed independent film Trick, which was picked up for North American distribution by Fine Line Features soon after its screening at the Sundance Film Festival, where it was nominated for the Grand Jury Prize. The film also won the Siegessäule Special Jury Teddy Award at the Berlin International Film Festival, and Outfest's Special Programming Committee Award for Outstanding Emerging Talent.

In 2003, Fall directed Disney's The Lizzie McGuire Movie. He later directed several TV movies, including Wedding Wars (2006) and the holiday-themed films Holiday Engagement (2011), Holly's Holiday (2012) and Kristin's Christmas Past (2013). Fall's award-winning short films He Touched Me and Love is Deaf, Dumb and Blind aired on the USA Network and Nickelodeon.

In 2018, Fall announced Trick 2, a sequel to Trick, which he had written and will direct.

Fall's television credits include episodes of Grosse Pointe (2000) and So NoTORIous (2006). He has also had a career in theatre, directing a number of stage productions in New York City.

Fall is an alumnus of Temple University and New York University's Tisch School of the Arts.

== Personal life ==
Fall is gay. In 2006, he married his then-boyfriend on the Halifax, Nova Scotia set of Wedding Wars.

== Filmography ==
Film

- Trick (1999) (Also producer)
- The Lizzie McGuire Movie (2003)

TV series

Year	Title	Notes
2000	Grosse Pointe	Episode "Puppet Master"
2000	Damaged Goods	Pilot
2006	So NoTORIous	Episodes "Street" and "Accommodating"

TV movies

- Wedding Wars (2006)
- Holiday Engagement (2011)
- Holly's Holiday (2012)
- Kristin's Christmas Past (2013)
