= Varla Jean Merman =

American drag queen

- Born: Jeffery Roberson; New Orleans, Louisiana
- Occupations: Drag performer; Actor
- Website: varlajean.com

Varla Jean Merman is the drag persona of American drag performer, actor and singer Jeffery Roberson. Varla's fictitious pedigree boasts that Ernest Borgnine is her father and Ethel Merman is her mother.

Merman is perhaps best known for her role in the 2003 independent film Girls Will Be Girls. She also had a co-starring role in the 1997 film Franchesca Page. Merman was also one of the performers featured in the HBO original documentary Dragtime. She has appeared in a number of short films and live cabaret acts since she and her male alter-ego attended the School of Music at Louisiana State University.

Merman's shows are a staple of summer entertainment in Provincetown, Massachusetts. She also performs fairly often in New Orleans, New York City, San Francisco, and London and has also enjoyed billing at the Sydney Opera House in Australia and Carnegie Hall.

The gay-themed television network Logo commissioned Merman to write and star in an animated educational short film about the Stonewall riots of 1969.

Merman appeared on the August 20, 2008 Project Runway episode "Good Queen Fun". The outfit created for her was the winning design.

She also had two short runs on the soap opera All My Children as the character "Rosemary Chicken".

Roberson has almost always been credited as either "Varla Merman" or "Varla Jean Merman" rather than his birth name, though in the role of Mary Sunshine in the Broadway revival of Chicago, he was credited as the gender-neutral "J. Roberson," in keeping with the show's tradition of concealing the performer's gender.

Merman appeared along with Leslie Jordan in the 2011 Off-Broadway musical Lucky Guy.

Varla Jean and the Mushroomheads, a film based on Roberson and Jacques Lamarre's fake kids' show that has been performed in New Orleans, San Francisco and Provincetown, Mass., was slated for a fall 2011 release. In it, an alcoholic Varla tricks a couple into paying for her services as a surrogate mother to raise money to produce a children's TV show.

Merman's 2012 schedule included the role of Madam Flora in an Off-Broadway production of the Gian Carlo Menotti opera The Medium.

In 2013, Merman played the title role in the Gold Dust Orphans production Mildred Fierce.

== Awards ==
Along with co-stars Miss Coco Peru and Evie Harris, Merman shared the Best Actor Grand Jury Award at Outfest 2003 and "Best Actress" honors at both the 2003 U.S. Comedy Arts Festival and the 2003 Aspen HBO Film Festival for her role in Girls Will Be Girls.
