= Brian Hutchison =

American actor

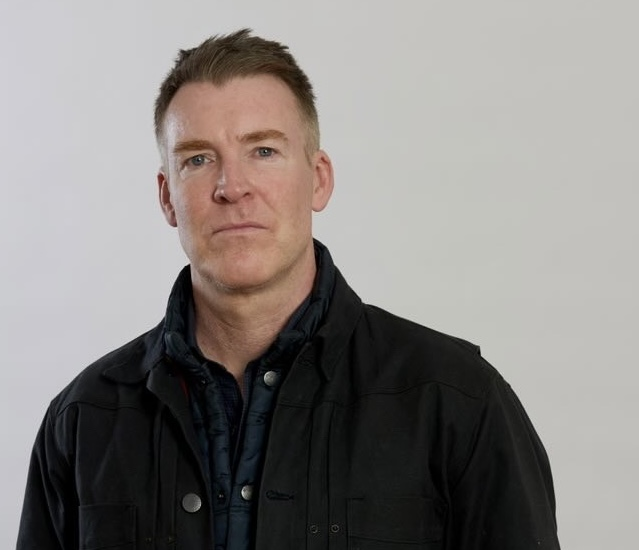
- Brian Hutchison in 2023
- Born: Pittsburgh, Pennsylvania
- Education: Lafayette College (BA); University of California, San Diego (MFA)
- Occupations: Actor; narrator; photographer
- Spouse: Ron Maggio (m. 2018)

Brian Hutchison is an American actor based in New York City. He has appeared on such network shows as The Gilded Age, The Equalizer, Blue Bloods, Madam Secretary, Chicago Med, Jessica Jones, Elementary, Law & Order: Special Victims Unit, Godfather of Harlem, The Sinner, FBI: Most Wanted and Lisey's Story.

He has appeared on and off Broadway in several shows including Downstate, Exit the King with Geoffrey Rush, Looped opposite Valerie Harper, and Man and Boy with Frank Langella. Hutchison has also performed at major regional theaters throughout the United States.

In 2018, Hutchison played the part of Alan in the Tony Award-winning revival of The Boys in the Band on Broadway. Directed by Joe Mantello, the cast included Jim Parsons, Zachary Quinto, Matt Bomer, Andrew Rannells, Tuc Watkins, Charlie Carver, Robin de Jesus, and Michael Benjamin Washington. The full cast reprised their roles in a movie version of the play that was filmed in 2019 and released on Netflix in September 2020.

In addition to acting, Hutchison is also a SOVA and Audie award-winning narrator who has recorded over 300 audio books for Audible. He is also a professional photographer, specializing in shooting publicity head shots for other actors. His portfolio also includes a wide range of candid portraits, landscapes and architectural detail.

== Education ==
Hutchison graduated from Sewickley Academy in 1989 and received a BA in English from Lafayette College in 1993 and earned his Master of Fine Arts at the University of San Diego. While in graduate school, he met director Jack O'Brien, who cast him in the title role of Brendan Behan's The Hostage at San Diego's Old Globe Theater. After graduating, he returned to the Old Globe and appeared in All My Sons and Blue/Orange.

== Personal life ==
Hutchison married real estate agent Ron Maggio in 2018 and they split their time between New York City and East Hampton. His brother, Chris Hutchison, is also an actor and a company member with Houston's Alley Theatre in Texas.

== Stage ==
=== Broadway ===
Year	Title	Role	Theatre	Notes
2000	Proof	Hal	Walter Kerr Theatre	Standby/Replacement
2001	The Invention of Love	Moses John Jackson	Lyceum Theatre	Understudy
2009	Exit the King	The Guard	Ethel Barrymore Theatre	
2010	Looped	Danny	Lyceum Theatre	
2011	Man and Boy	David Beeston	American Airlines Theatre	
2018	The Boys in the Band	Alan	Booth Theatre	

=== Off Broadway ===
Year	Title	Role	Theatre
2003	Can't Let Go	Bill	Keen Company
2006	Theophilus North	Hilary	Keen Company
2006	Indoor/Outdoor	Shuman	SPF, DR2 Theater
2007	Oh, The Humanity	Multiple roles	The Flea Theater
2008	From Up Here	Step-dad	Manhattan Theater Club
2010	Spirit Control	Karl	Manhattan Theater Club
2011	Go Back To Where You Are	Bernard	Playwrights Horizons
2012	Regrets	Ben Clancy	Manhattan Theater Club
2014	Pocatello	Nick	Playwrights Horizons
2016	Smokefall	Daniel/Fetus One	MCC Theater
2017	How To Transcend a Happy Marriage	Michael	Lincoln Center Theater
2022	Downstate	Andy	Playwrights Horizons

=== Regional ===
Year	Title	Role	Theatre
2002	All My Sons	Chris Keller	Old Globe Theatre
2003	Blue/Orange	Bruce	Old Globe Theatre
2007	The Unmentionables	Dave	Yale Repertory Theatre
2007	The Front Page		Williamstown Theatre Festival
2008	Of Mice and Men	George	Westport County Playhouse
2009	Dinner	Mike	Bay Street Theatre
2012	Men's Lives	Lee	Bay Street Theatre
2014	Conviction	Bruce	Bay Street Theatre
2017	Big Night	Michael	Center Theatre Group

== Filmography ==
=== Film ===
Year	Title	Role	Notes
1995	Sudden Death	Young Secret Service Agent	
2005	Dealbreaker	Jared	Short film
2008	Ghost Town	Accident Bystander	
2010	Love & Other Drugs	Homeless Man	
2013	Vino Veritas	Phil	
2014	Winter's Tale	Ellis Island Official	
2015	Bridge of Spies	FBI Agent	
2015	Love Life	A Rand Fan	Short film
2020	The Boys in the Band	Alan	
2025	The History of Sound	Hal	
2026	Disclosure Day	Aide	

=== Television ===
Year	Title	Role	Notes
2004	Law & Order: Criminal Intent	Detective Bruno	Episode: "Silver Lining"
2005	Law & Order: Special Victims Unit	Officer Wes Meyers	Episode: "Goliath"
2006	Hope & Faith	Sean	Episode "Old Faithful"
2010	The Good Wife	Congressman Timmerman	Episode: "Taking Control"
2013	Person of Interest	SAIC Brian Moss	3 episodes
2013	Do No Harm	Frank Taylor	2 episodes
2013	Killing Kennedy	Winston Lawson	Television movie
2015	Show Me a Hero	Police Captain	Miniseries; 2 episodes
2016	Vinyl	Agent Seeley	Episode: "Alibi"
2017	Law & Order: Special Victims Unit	Frank Wilson	Episode: "Great Expectations"
2017	Elementary	Kurt Godwyn	Episode: "Rekt in Real Life"
2018	Jessica Jones	Dale Holiday	2 episodes
2018	Instinct	Dr. James Walters	Episode: "Flat Line"
2018- 2019	Madam Secretary	Father Justin DiNardo	2 episodes
2019	Chicago Med	Joseph Cooper	Episode: "Never Let You Go"
2019	Blue Bloods	Connor O'Brien	Episode: "Glass Houses"
2019	Godfather of Harlem	George Lincoln Rockwell	Episode: "How I Got Over"
2020	The Sinner	Mitch Russo	2 episodes
2020	FBI: Most Wanted	Austin Stevens	Episode: "Reveille"
2021	Lisey's Story	Chief Craig Richards	Miniseries; 2 episodes
2022	The Equalizer	Leo Day	Episode: "One Percenters"
2023	The Gilded Age	Mason Sturt	Episode: "Close Enough to Touch"

== Audiobooks ==
He has voiced over 150+ audiobooks for four major companies: Audible, Recorded Books, Blackstone Audio, and Simon & Schuster.

== See also ==
- LGBT culture in New York City
- List of LGBT people from New York City
- NYC Pride March
