= Tuc Watkins =

American actor

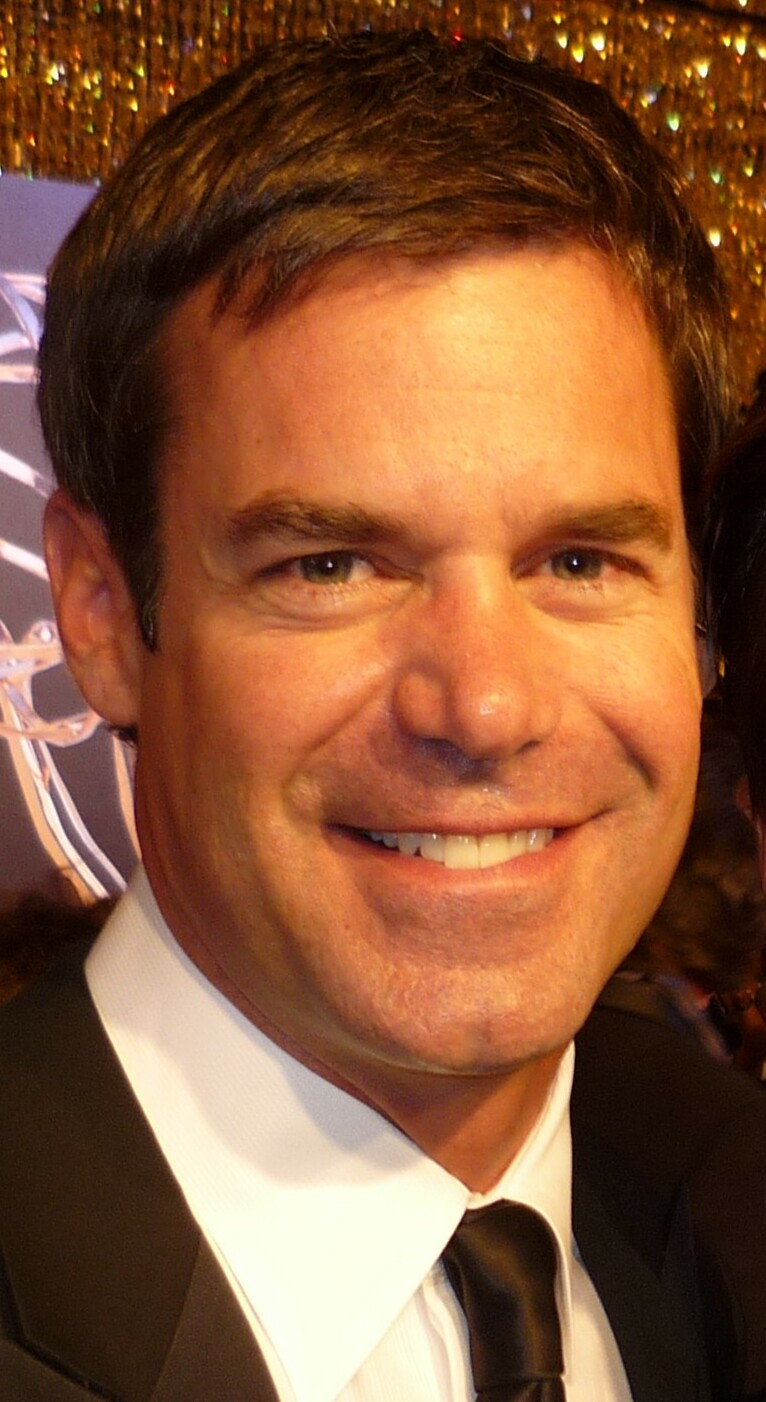
- Watkins in 2010
- Born: Charles Curtis Watkins III; September 2, 1966 (age 60); Kansas City, Kansas, U.S.
- Education: Indiana University Bloomington (BS)
- Occupation: Actor
- Years active: 1990–present
- Partner: Andrew Rannells (2019-present)
- Children: 2

Charles Curtis "Tuc" Watkins III (born September 2, 1966) is an American actor, known for his roles as David Vickers on One Life to Live, Bernard Burns in The Mummy, Bob Hunter on Desperate Housewives, Congressman Roger Harris on Black Monday, Hank in The Boys in the Band, Troy on The Other Two, and Colin McKenna on Uncoupled.

== Early life and education ==
Charles Curtis Watkins III was born in Kansas City, Kansas. He graduated from Parkway West High School in 1985. He then attended Indiana University Bloomington where he majored in communications with a triple minor in theatre, psychology, and French. He has a younger sister, Courtney, born in 1968.

== Career ==
Watkins started his career with guest appearances on various television series including Baywatch, Get a Life, Melrose Place, and Sisters. He portrayed con-man David Vickers on the ABC soap opera One Life to Live from 1994 to 1996, next joining the soap opera General Hospital in the recurring role of Dr. Pierce Dorman from 1996 to 1997. That same year, he made his film debut in the independent romantic screwball comedy I Think I Do playing Sterling Scott, the soap opera hunk boyfriend of Bob, played by Alexis Arquette.

In 1999, Watkins made his first major appearance in a big studio production, The Mummy as the near-sighted glasses-wearing tomb raider Burns. That same year, he began starring as network executive Malcolm Laffley on the Showtime series Beggars and Choosers. He remained on the series for its entire two-season run until Showtime cancelled the series in 2001. That same year, he returned to One Life to Live with a brief appearance as Vickers. After making another brief reappearance the next year, Watkins rejoined the cast of One Life to Live full-time from 2003 through 2006. He made several short-term returns to the show from 2007 to 2009, returning again on a regular basis beginning in June 2010. Soap Opera Digest named Watkins's David their "Most Entertaining Male Character" of 2008, noting that "Time and time again, David's harebrained schemes and Tuc Watkins's side-splitting performances provide amusement we're always sorry to see end." He also made guest appearances on television series such as NYPD Blue, Six Feet Under, Cold Case, and CSI: Crime Scene Investigation.

On October 21, 2007, Watkins made his first appearance on ABC's Emmy-winning primetime series Desperate Housewives as Bob Hunter, an attorney who moves to Wisteria Lane with his husband Lee, played by Kevin Rahm. The role attracted media attention for presenting the first recurring gay couple on the series. He was a recurring character in seasons 4–6, and a series regular in seasons 7–8, staying on the series through its series finale on May 13, 2012. In July 2009, a Funny or Die video called The Sentimentalist starring Watkins was ranked number five on Entertainment Weekly's "The Must List", which notes the magazine's ten weekly choices among film, television, DVDs, books, music, and online entertainment for "The Top 10 Things We Love This Week". From 2012 to 2014, he played the recurring role of Pistol Pete on NBC's Emmy-nominated comedy series Parks and Recreation.

In 2017, Watkins was cast as Hank in a revival of the 1968 play The Boys in the Band, debuting on Broadway for the first time to coincide with the 50th anniversary of its premiere. Directed by Joe Mantello, he co-starred among the ensemble cast of Matt Bomer, Jim Parsons, Zachary Quinto, Andrew Rannells, Charlie Carver, Robin de Jesús, Brian Hutchison, and Michael Benjamin Washington. All of the actors who were in the 2018 production are openly gay. The production opened in previews at the Booth Theatre on April 30, 2018, before officially opening on May 31, and ran until August 11, 2018. The revival received acclaim from critics and audiences, winning the 2019 Tony Award for Best Revival of a Play. Watkins and the entire cast reprised their roles for a 2020 Netflix adaption, which also received positive reviewes. That same year, he recurred in the second season of Showtime's Emmy-nominated comedy series Black Monday, reuniting with his Boys in the Band co-star Rannells.

In 2022, Watkins starred on the Netflix comedy series Uncoupled as Colin McKenna, the ex-boyfriend to Neil Patrick Harris' character who leaves him after a 17-year relationship. The series premiered to critical acclaim on Netflix on July 29, 2022. Although Showtime picked up a second season of the series, it was eventually cancelled after being delayed by the 2023 Hollywood strikes.

In August 2026, Deadline reported that Watkins will star in the television Prime Video romantic comedy series Escorted, produced by Brett Goldstein.

== Personal life ==
Watkins came out as gay on April 26, 2013, in an interview on Marie with Marie Osmond. In that same interview, Watkins announced he had become a single father in December 2012 by welcoming twins via surrogacy.

Since 2019, he has been in a relationship with actor Andrew Rannells. The two had met the prior year while playing a couple in the Broadway production of The Boys in the Band. They reprised their roles for Netflix's film version, and also portrayed a couple on Black Monday.

== Filmography ==
=== Film ===
| Year | Title | Role | Notes |
|---|---|---|---|
| 1992 | Little Sister | Ted Armstrong | Uncredited |
| 1997 | I Think I Do | Sterling Scott | |
| 1998 | The Thin Pink Line | Ted | |
| 1999 | Can't Stop Dancing | Reuben Clairmont | |
| 1999 | The Mummy | Bernard Burns | |
| 2002 | Infested | Carl | |
| 2003 | The Free House | Harry Cook | |
| 2004 | The Free House 2 | God/Harry Cook | |
| 2006 | The Good Shepherd | Sound Technical Officer | |
| 2009 | Moon Lake Casino | Skipper | Short Film |
| 2016 | Retake | Jonathan | |
| 2020 | The Boys in the Band | Hank | |
| 2025 | Exit Interviews | Robert | |
| 2026 | Death on the Brandywine | Sean Riley | |

=== Television ===
| Year | Title | Role | Notes |
|---|---|---|---|
| 1990 | Get a Life | Sapphire | Episode: "The Prettiest Week of My Life" |
| 1990 | Growing Pains | Trainer | Episode: "Jason Flirts, Maggie Hurts" |
| 1991 | Harry and the Hendersons | Marcel | Episode: "When Harry Met Sammy" |
| 1991–1992 | Sisters | Brad | 2 episodes |
| 1992 | Sibs | —N/a | Episode: "The In Crowd" |
| 1992 | Baywatch | Gary | Episode: "Game of Chance" |
| 1992 | Santa Barbara | Reggie | Episode 2040 |
| 1992 | The Edge | —N/a | Episode: 1.1 |
| 1993 | Melrose Place | Tom Brooks | Episode: "Single White Sister" |
| 1994–1996, 2001–2013 | One Life to Live | David Vickers | Role held: 1994–96; October 2001; January 2002; August 19, 2003 – November 21, 2006; May – July 26, 2007; November 2007; May 7 – August 6, 2008; December 26, 2008 – March 2, 2009; April 7, 2009; April 22, 23, and 27, 2009; August 10 – November 30, 2009; January 12 – April 2, 2010; June 3 – August 26, 2010; January 4–6, 2011; March 15, 2011 – January 12, 2012; April 29 – August 19, 2013 |
| 1996 | High Tide | Shane Wilson | 2 episodes |
| 1996–1997 | General Hospital | Dr. Pierce Dorman | Unknown episodes |
| 1997 | Silk Stalkings | Special Agent Sidley | Episode: "Ladies Man" |
| 1997–1998 | C-16: FBI | Jimmy Rooney | Recurring role; 3 episodes |
| 1999–2001 | Beggars and Choosers | Malcolm Laffley | Main cast; 42 episodes |
| 2000 | NYPD Blue | Derrick | Episode: "The Irvin Files" |
| 2000 | Miracle in Lane 2 | God/Bobby Wade | Television film |
| 2001 | Family Law | Sean Santoro | Episode: "The Gay Divorcee" |
| 2002 | Six Feet Under | Trevor | Episode: "Out, Out, Brief Candle" |
| 2002 | CSI: Crime Scene Investigation | Marcus Remmick | Episode: "Cats in the Cradle" |
| 2005 | All My Children | David Vickers | 2 episodes |
| 2006 | 13 Graves | Lawrence | Television film |
| 2007 | The Minor Accomplishments of Jackie Woodman | Josh | Episode: "Jackie Meets Her Match" |
| 2007–2012 | Desperate Housewives | Bob Hunter | Recurring, seasons 4–6; main cast, seasons 7–8; 42 episodes |
| 2007 | Cold Case | Felton Metz '38 | Episode: "World's End" |
| 2008 | Point View Terrace | Freddy Hayes | Unsold pilot; also producer |
| 2012–2014 | Parks and Recreation | "Pistol Pete" Disellio | 3 episodes |
| 2012 | Franklin & Bash | Lance Dillon | Episode: L'affaire Du Coeur |
| 2012 | The Glades | Dr. Brett Denning | Episode: "Old Times" |
| 2012 | Baby Daddy | Hank | Episode: "Take Her Out of the Ballgame" |
| 2013 | Maron | Jerry | Episode: "Internet Troll" |
| 2013 | Warehouse 13 | Nate | Episode: "Instinct" |
| 2013 | Anger Management | Jeff | Episode: "Charlie and the Devil" |
| 2013 | Bob's Burgers | Butcher | Voice; episode: "Turkey in a Can" |
| 2014 | Awkward | Joe Miller | 4 episodes |
| 2015 | Major Crimes | Judge Stephen Schaeffer | Episode: "Special Master: Part One"; Episode: Special Master: Part Two" |
| 2015 | Tim and Eric's Bedtime Stories | Boss | Episode: "Tornado" |
| 2016 | Telenovela | Ana's date | Episode: "The Kiss" |
| 2016 | It's Always Sunny in Philadelphia | Scott | Episode: "The Gang Goes to Hell" |
| 2016 | Ballers | Jim | Episode: "Enter the Temple" |
| 2016 | Castle | Roger Masters | Episode: "Witness for the Prosecution" |
| 2017 | EastSiders | Patrick | Episode: "East of Eden" |
| 2020–21 | Black Monday | Congressman Roger Harris | 7 episodes |
| 2021 | The Other Two | Troy | 2 episodes |
| 2022–25 | The Great North | Various roles | Voice; 6 episodes |
| 2022 | Uncoupled | Colin McKenna | Recurring role |
| 2022 | The Sex Lives of College Girls | Eric's Dad | Episode: "The Essex College Food Workers Strike" |
| 2024 | Criminal Minds: Evolution | Frank Church | Episode: "Stars & Stripes"; Episode: "Save the Children" |
| 2025 – present | Paradise | Tim Redmond | Recurring role; 5 episodes |
| 2026 | Shifting Gears | Pete Holterman | Episode: "Friend" |
| 2026 | The Rookie | Russell Wilkes | Episode: "Cut and Run" |

=== Web ===
| Year | Title | Role | Notes |
|---|---|---|---|
| 2010 | Proposition 8 Trial Re-Enactment | Terry Thompson | |
| 2012–15 | Where the Bears Are | Dick Calloway | 6 episodes + current year |
| 2022–25 | Unconventional | Dr. Trip Howell | 6 episodes |

=== Stage ===
| Year | Title | Role | Notes |
|---|---|---|---|
| 2018 | The Boys in The Band | Hank | Broadway |

== See also ==
- LGBT culture in New York City
- List of LGBT people from New York City
