= Marianne Hagan =

American actress and writer (born 1966)

- Born: Marianne Louise Hagan; December 8, 1966 (age 59); New York City, U.S.
- Education: Duke University
- Occupations: Actress, writer
- Years active: 1990–present
- Notable work: Halloween: The Curse of Michael Myers
- Spouse: Trey Duckworth (divorced)

Marianne Louise Hagan (born December 8, 1966) is an American actress and writer. She played Kara Strode in the 1995 horror sequel Halloween: The Curse of Michael Myers, the sixth installment in the Halloween franchise.

== Personal life ==
Hagan was born to Louise and James Hagan in the Bronx borough of New York City and was raised in Pocantico Hills, a small hamlet within the town on Mount Pleasant in New York. She has three sisters, Victoria, Christine and Joanna. She graduated cum laude with a B.A. in political science from Duke University.

For many years, Hagan resided in New York City and in March 2016 she returned to Mount Pleasant, where she currently resides in Sleepy Hollow.

== Career ==
=== Acting career ===
Hagan's first feature is one she is best known for among horror fans, her role as Kara Strode in the 1995 horror sequel Halloween: The Curse of Michael Myers, her character is an adopted cousin of original Halloween character Laurie Strode. She appeared at the convention for Halloween: 25 Years of Terror event in 2003. Most recently she has appeared in horror films Stake Land, which stars Danielle Harris also of Halloween 4 & Halloween 5, and BreadCrumbs. She has also appeared in Dinner and a Movie, in which she played the lead role, I Think I Do, and Rick, which stars Bill Pullman.

In 2006 she appeared in the horror trailer Dead Calling, in what was intended to become a feature film, which didn’t reach fruition. The trailer also featured fellow Halloween cast members, Ellie Cornell of Halloween 4: The Return of Michael Myers & Halloween 5: The Revenge of Michael Myers, P.J. Soles of Halloween, Charles Cyphers of Halloween & Halloween II, and Brad Loree of Halloween: Resurrection. Hagan explained in the podcast series Happy Horror Time, the intention of a feature-length film and that it was mistakenly added to IMDb as such, for which it is unable to be removed.

Her television credits include Who's the Boss?, which was her debut as an actress, Major Dad, SeaQuest DSV, Law & Order, Law & Order: Criminal Intent, Law & Order: Special Victims Unit, and Friends in which she played a friend of Rachel's.

She has also starred in theater productions including Inky at the Julia Miles Theatre/ Women's Project Theater, in which she played the character of "Barbara". She has appeared in several other productions including Fiction, Mercy, The Country Club, Skyscraper and In Heat.

=== Other work ===
As a journalist, Hagan has written pieces for the arts and culture magazines, including BlackBook (for whom she interviewed such figures as Lou Reed) and Room 100. She is the author of the book, Victoria Hagan: Interior Portraits, which was released on October 12, 2010. Marianne and her sister Victoria appeared on The Martha Stewart Show, as part of the episode titled "The Sisters Show", in which they talked about the book.

== Filmography ==
=== Film ===
| Year | Title | Role | Notes |
|---|---|---|---|
| 1995 | Halloween: The Curse of Michael Myers | Kara Strode | |
| 1997 | I Think I Do | Sarah | |
| 1999 | Pigeonholed | Nurse Helen | |
| 2001 | Perfume | Sales Manager | |
| 2001 | Dinner and a Movie | Katie Semelhack | |
| 2002 | For Caroline | Jimmy's mother | Short |
| 2002 | Life Document 2: Identity | Jessica | Short |
| 2003 | Rick | Laura | |
| 2006 | Dead Calling | Sharon Falkman | Trailer only (movie never produced) |
| 2010 | Stake Land | Dr. Foley | |
| 2011 | BreadCrumbs | Angie Hart | |
| 2012 | Last Kind Words | Ida | |
| 2014 | Three, Two | Mother | Short |
| 2015 | Naomi and Ely's No Kiss List | Susan | |
| 2018 | We Only Know So Much | Touchy Feely Woman | |
| 2023 | The Forest Hills | Jordana | |
| 2023 | Full Moon Fever | Jenny Dunne | |
| TBA | Lower Lake | Hailey | Pre-production |

=== Television ===
| Year | Title | Role | Notes |
|---|---|---|---|
| 1990 | Who's the Boss? | Lynn | "Road Scholar" |
| 1991 | Major Dad | Donna | "Lady in Waiting" |
| 1994 | seaQuest DSV | Cynthia Westphalen | "The Good Death" |
| 1994 | Friends | Joanne | "The One with George Stephanopoulos" |
| 1995 | New York News | Cheryl Singer | "Forgotten" |
| 1995 | Law & Order | Marcie Donner | "Savages" |
| 1996 | Early Edition | Marcia Roberts Hobson | "Pilot" |
| 1996 | The Gail O'Grady Project | Packard | TV film |
| 1997 | Law & Order | Jane Levin | "Blood" |
| 1998 | Law & Order | Theresa Copeland | "Flight" |
| 1999 | Homicide: Life on the Street | Lucy Carey | "Lines of Fire" |
| 2000 | Ed | Liz Stevens | "Pilot" |
| 2002 | Law & Order: Criminal Intent | Susan Colter | "Homo Homini Lupis" |
| 2002 | Law & Order: Special Victims Unit | Erin Sena | "Monogamy" |
| 2003 | Third Watch | Linda | "Collateral Damage: Parts 1 & 2" |
| 2005 | Law & Order: Special Victims Unit | Mrs. Sellers | "Pure" |

== Theatre ==
- Inky, by Rinne Groff, directed by Loretta Greco—The Julia Miles Theater/The Women's Project
- Fiction, by Steven Dietz, directed by David Warren—The McCarter Theatre
- Mercy, by Laura Cahill, directed by Loretta Greco—The Vineyard Theater
- The Country Club, by Douglas Carter Beane, directed by Christopher Ashley—The Long Wharf Theater
- Skyscraper, by David Auburn, directed by Michael Rego—The Greenwich Hous Theater/The Acara Group
- In Heat, by Malcolm Danare, directed by James Eckhouse—The Lost Studio

== Books ==
- Hagan, Marianne (2010). Victoria Hagan: Interior Portraits. New York: Rizzoli. ISBN 978-0-8478-3489-1. OCLC 763171067.
- Hagan, Victoria; Colman, David (2017). Victoria Hagan: Dream Spaces. New York: Rizzoli International Publications. ISBN 9780847859962. OCLC 974262064.
