= Charlie Carver =

American actor (born 1988)

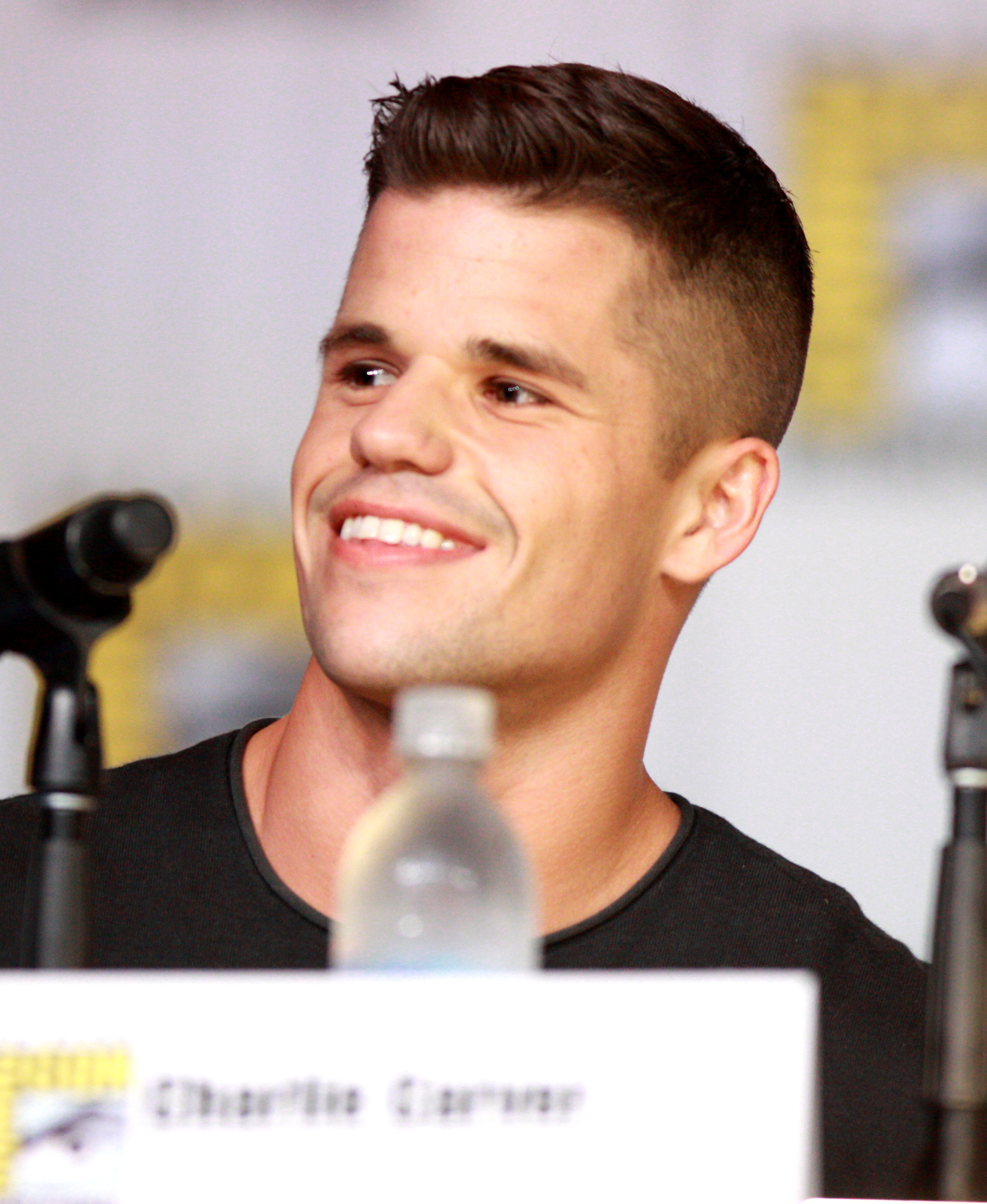
- Carver at the 2013 San Diego Comic-Con
- Born: Charles Carver Martensen; July 31, 1988 (age 38); San Francisco, California, U.S.
- Other name: Charles Carver
- Education: University of Southern California (BA); American Conservatory Theater
- Occupations: Actor; television writer
- Years active: 2008–present
- Father: Robert Martensen
- Relatives: Max Carver (brother)

Charles Carver Martensen (born July 31, 1988) is an American actor and writer. His better known roles include Porter Scavo on the ABC television series Desperate Housewives (2008–2012), Ethan on the MTV television series Teen Wolf (2013–2014, 2017), Scott Frost on the first season of the HBO television series The Leftovers (2014), and as Cowboy in both The Boys in the Band on Broadway and the subsequent 2020 film of the same name. His identical twin brother Max Carver has frequently portrayed the twin of his characters.

== Early life ==
Carver was born in San Francisco, California, on July 31, 1988. His identical twin brother, Max, was born seven minutes later on August 1. Before he began acting professionally, he was known as Charlie Martensen. His father was a physician, historian, and author Robert Martensen, and his mother, Anne Carver (b. 1952), is a philanthropist and community activist. In 1992, Anne and her new husband Denis Sutro moved the family to Calistoga in Napa Valley. Carver attended high school at St. Paul's School in Concord, New Hampshire, but left to attend Interlochen Arts Academy in Interlochen, Michigan his second year. He graduated from the University of Southern California in 2012. He also studied acting at the American Conservatory Theater in San Francisco. He came out as gay on Instagram in 2016.

== Career ==
Carver made his acting debut as an eighth-grader when he played fairy trickster Puck in his school's production of Shakespeare's A Midsummer Night's Dream.

His screen debut was with his brother in the ABC television series, Desperate Housewives; they played Porter and Preston Scavo, sons to Lynette Scavo and Tom Scavo. The brothers also appeared together in season 3 of Teen Wolf on MTV as a pair of twin alpha werewolves – Charlie played Ethan Steiner, and Max played Aiden Steiner; Charlie also appeared in Season 6B of the show. They also appeared in the first season of HBO series The Leftovers.

Carver has guest starred on several shows including Hawaii Five-0, and The League. His feature film roles have included Underdogs, Bad Asses, and I Am Michael.

Carver appeared in the ABC miniseries When We Rise in 2017. The production traced the history of the LGBTQ rights movement, beginning with the Stonewall riots in 1969. Carver himself came out as gay in 2016. Carver made his Broadway debut as Cowboy in the 2018 revival of Mart Crowley's The Boys in the Band and reprised the role in the 2020 film of the same name, alongside fellow actors Jim Parsons, Zachary Quinto, Matt Bomer, Andrew Rannells, Robin de Jesús, Tuc Watkins and Michael Benjamin Washington.

Carver starred in the Netflix drama series Ratched, which was released in September 2020. In 2022, Carver starred in American Horror Story: NYC. In addition to the lead role, he also co-wrote four episodes of the season. In 2024, he co-wrote one episode of American Horror Stories.

== Filmography ==
=== Film ===
Year	Film	Role	Notes
2013	Underdogs	John Handon III	As Charles Carver
2014	Bad Asses	Eric	Also known as Bad Ass 2: Bad Asses
2015	I Am Michael	Tyler	
2017	Fist Fight	Nathaniel	
2017	A Midsummer Night's Dream	Snout	
2018	In the Cloud	Jude	
2020	The Boys in the Band	Cowboy	
2022	The Batman	The Twin	

=== Television ===
Year	Title	Role	Notes
2008–2012	Desperate Housewives	Porter Scavo	Main role (seasons 5–8); 62 episodes
2012	Fred 3: Camp Fred	Hugh Thompson	Television film
2013	Restless Virgins	Dylan	Television film
2013–2014, 2017	Teen Wolf	Ethan Steiner	Recurring role (seasons 3, 6); 22 episodes
2014	The Leftovers	Scott Frost	Main role (season 1); 5 episodes
2014	Hawaii Five-0	Travis Kealoha	Episode: "Ka Hana Malu"
2015	The League	Trophy Kevin	Episode: "Trophy Kevin"
2017	When We Rise	Michael	Miniseries
2020	Ratched	Huck Finnigan	Main role
2022	American Horror Story: NYC	Adam Carpenter	Main role

=== Writing credits ===
Year	Title	Writer	Producer	Notes
2022	American Horror Story: NYC	Yes	Yes	Co–writer: "Thank You for Your Service", "Black Out", "Fire Island" and "Requiem 1981/1987: Part Two"
2023–2024	American Horror Stories	Yes	Yes	Co–writer: "Clone"
2026	American Horror Story: 13	Yes	Executive	Co–writer of episodes 2–13

=== Stage ===
Year	Title	Role	Notes
2018	The Boys in The Band	Cowboy	Broadway debut

=== Music videos ===
Year	Title	Artist(s)	Role
2016	"Where Is the Love?"	The Black Eyed Peas featuring The World	Himself
2019	"Bad Habit"	Ben Platt	Boyfriend
2019	"Ease My Mind"	Ben Platt	Boyfriend

== Awards and nominations ==
Year	Association	Category	Work	Result	Ref.
2008	Screen Actors Guild Award	Outstanding Performance by an Ensemble in a Comedy Series	Desperate Housewives (shared with rest of cast)	Nominated	
2019	Broadway.com Audience Awards	Favorite Breakthrough Performance (Male)	The Boys in the Band	Nominated	
2020	GLSEN	Gamechanger Award	Himself	Won	

== See also ==
- LGBT culture in New York City
- List of LGBT people from New York City
- NYC Pride March
