= Just One Time =

Just One Time may refer to:

== Film ==
- Just One Time (film), 1999 comedy film directed by Lane Janger.
  - Just One Time (short film), a 1998 short also directed by Lane Janger and on which the 1999 long feature is based on
- Just This Once, 1952 film directed by Don Weis
- Just One More Time, 1974 British comedy film directed by Maurice Hamblin

== Music ==
- Just One Time (album), an album by American country music artist, Connie Smith
- "Just One Time" (song), a single by American country music artist Don Gibson, also covered by Connie Smith in her album of same title
