= Bernard White (actor) =

American actor (born 1959)

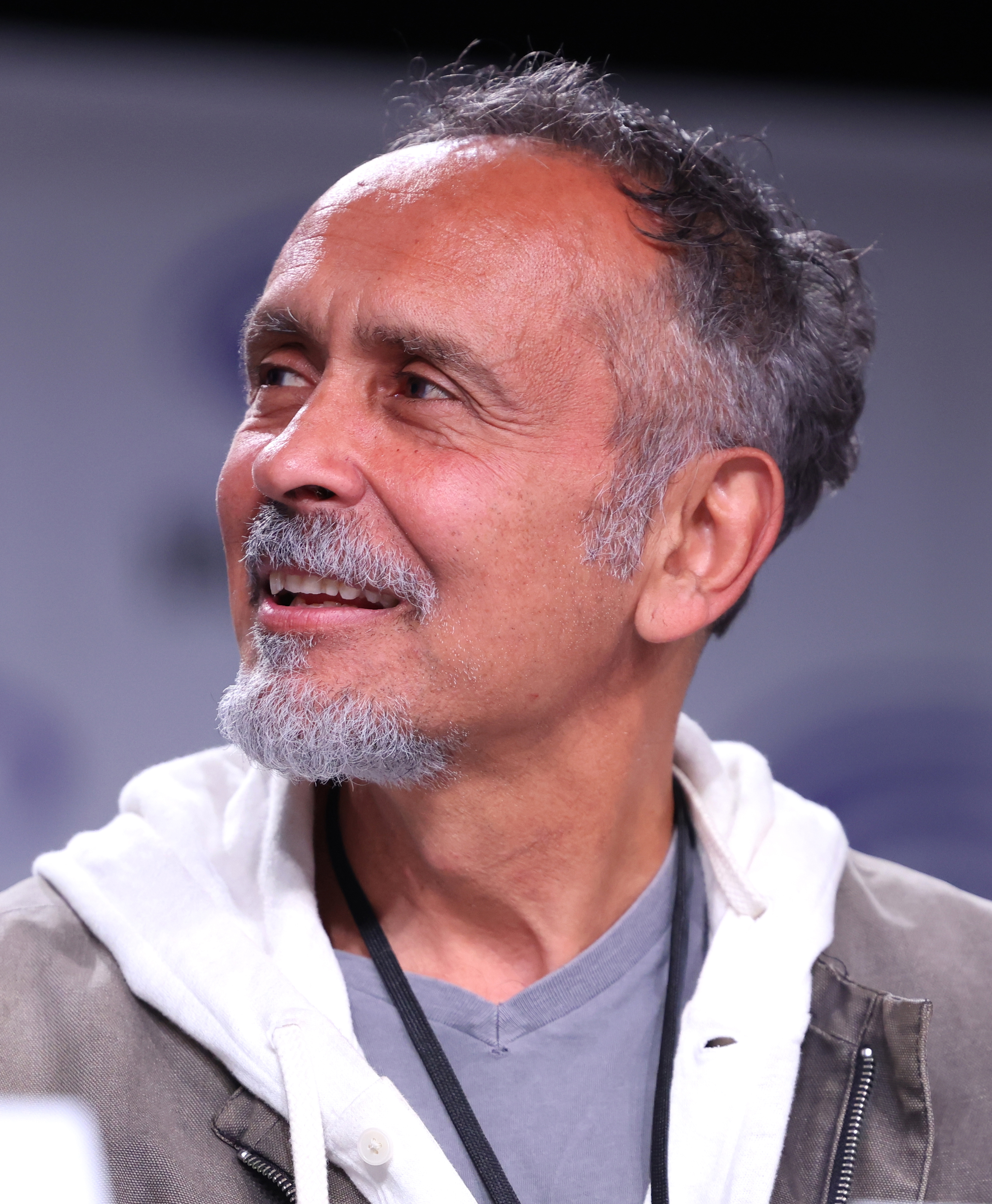
- White in 2025
- Born: 1959 (age 66–67); Kandy, Ceylon
- Education: Michigan State University (BA)
- Occupation: Actor
- Years active: 1983–present
- Relatives: Duncan White (uncle)

Bernard White (born 1959) is an American film and television actor.

== Early life ==
White was born in Kandy, Ceylon (now Sri Lanka), to an English-speaking Catholic family of Burgher descent. His uncle was hurdler Duncan White, the winner of Ceylon's first Olympic medal. In May 1960, when White was eleven months old, his family immigrated to the United States, eventually settling in Detroit, Michigan. White attended Detroit Catholic Central High School before graduating from Michigan State University in 1982 with a Bachelor of Arts degree in theater.

== Career ==
White began his career with roles in soap operas, appearing on General Hospital, Santa Barbara and Days of Our Lives. From 1989 to 1990, he starred in both seasons of The New Dragnet as Detective Carl Molina. White's film work includes appearances in such films as The Scorpion King, The Matrix Reloaded, The Matrix Revolutions, and Raising Helen. His body of television work includes his portrayal of Denpok Singh, the sycophantic spiritual guru of tech CEO Gavin Belson on the HBO series Silicon Valley.

== Filmography ==
| Year | Title | Role | Notes |
|---|---|---|---|
| 1983 | Days of Our Lives | Paul 'Snake' Selejko | TV series |
| 1985 | American Drive-In | Lou | |
| 1985 | Knight Rider | Eddie Deskey | Episode: "Buy Out" |
| 1985 | The Last Hunt | | |
| 1986 | The Eleventh Commandment | Robert Knight | |
| 1986 | The Education of Allison Tate | John Riversong | |
| 1987 | Body Count | Robert Knight | |
| 1987 | Murder, She Wrote | George Longbow | TV series |
| 1988 | 227 | Carlos | TV series |
| 1989-90 | The New Dragnet | LAPD Detective Carl Molina | TV series 52 episodes |
| 1990 | Ain't No Way Back | Joe Campbell | |
| 1991 | The Entertainers | Luis | |
| 1991 | Twenty Dollar Star | Brian | |
| 1994 | Killing Obsession | Lt. Jackson | |
| 1995 | The Wacky Adventures of Dr. Boris and Nurse Shirley | | |
| 1996 | JAG | Captain Carlos Fuentes | Episode: "Smoked" |
| 1997 | Viper | Рaraguay terrorist SE2/EP14 | |
| 1998 | City of Angels | Circulating Nurse #2 | |
| 2000 | Pay It Forward | Cop | |
| 2002 | The Scorpion King | Falconmaster | |
| 2003 | 24 | Imam al-Fulani | |
| 2003–2004 | JAG | Sadik Fahd | 4 episodes: "Pas de Deaux", "A Tangled Webb, Parts 1 and 2", "Persian Gulf" |
| 2003 | The Matrix Reloaded | Rama Kandra | |
| 2003 | The Matrix Revolutions | Rama Kandra | |
| 2004 | Raising Helen | Ravi Prasad | |
| 2004 | Land of Plenty | Youssef | |
| 2005 | Sueño | Vijay | |
| 2006 | Sharif Don't Like It | Butoh Dancer | |
| 2006 | American Dreamz | Agha Babur | |
| 2007 | Pain Within | Dr. Shible | |
| 2007 | The World Unseen | Mr. Harjan | |
| 2007 | The Unit | Khan | TV Series, Season 2 Episode 17, "Dark of the Moon" |
| 2008 | Quarantine | Bernard | |
| 2009 | NCIS | Ambassador Qasim Saydia | TV series |
| 2010 | It's Kind of a Funny Story | Muqtada | |
| 2013 | Vino Veritas | Ridley | |
| 2014 | Captain America: The Winter Soldier | Councilman Singh | |
| 2014–2019 | Silicon Valley | Denpok | TV series |
| 2016 | Chee and T | Uncle Rob | |
| 2017 | Rebel in the Rye | Swami Nikhilanand | |
| 2018 | The Blacklist | Zarek Mosadek | TV series |
| 2018 | Kidding | Scott Perera | TV series |
| 2020 | Evil Eye | Krishnan | TV film |
| 2022 | Roar | Vikras | TV series |
| 2022 | Big Sky | Verr Bhullar | TV series |
| 2023 | Beef | Firouz | TV series |
| 2023 | What If...? | Councilman Singh (voice) | TV series |
| 2024 | Shook | Vijay | Film |
| 2024 | Ghosts | Mahesh Arondekar | TV series |
