= The Boys in the Band (2020 film) =

2020 film by Joe Mantello

- Promotional poster
- Directed by: Joe Mantello
- Screenplay by: Mart Crowley; Ned Martel
- Based on: The Boys in the Band by Mart Crowley
- Produced by: Ryan Murphy; David Stone; Joe Mantello; Ned Martel; Alexis Martin Woodall
- Starring: Jim Parsons; Zachary Quinto; Matt Bomer; Andrew Rannells; Charlie Carver; Robin de Jesús; Brian Hutchison; Michael Benjamin Washington; Tuc Watkins
- Cinematography: Bill Pope
- Edited by: Adriaan van Zyl
- Production company: Ryan Murphy Productions
- Distributed by: Netflix
- Release date: September 30, 2020
- Running time: 122 minutes
- Country: United States
- Language: English

The Boys in the Band is a 2020 American drama film directed by Joe Mantello, based on the 1968 play of the same name by Mart Crowley, who also wrote the screenplay alongside Ned Martel. Crowley had previously adapted the stage play for a 1970 film directed by William Friedkin and starring the original Off-Broadway cast. The remake film stars the full roster of exclusively openly-gay actors from the play's 2018 Broadway revival. Netflix released the film on September 30, 2020, to positive reviews from critics.

== Plot ==
In 1968, Michael arrives at his apartment on the Upper East Side of Manhattan in preparation for Harold's birthday party. Michael receives a call from his friend Donald, who will be arriving early due to a canceled psychiatrist appointment. When Donald arrives, Michael pities his own aging and debt-riddled lifestyle. Alan, Michael's old roommate from Georgetown, calls Michael in tears saying he has something urgent to tell Michael in person. Michael invites Alan to the party and warns all his guests that Alan is heterosexual and doesn't know about Michael's homosexuality.

As the sun sets, Emory arrives with lovers Hank and Larry, whose relationship is on the rocks. Bernard arrives with a stack of books for Donald before he too settles into the party atmosphere. Alan calls Michael from a phone booth, informing him that he isn't coming to the party after all and will instead meet Michael the following day for lunch. Larry and Bernard dance to "Heat Wave" as Emory and Michael join in.

Despite his earlier conversation with Michael, Alan arrives at the party and finds Michael and his friends dancing. He bonds with Hank, whom he mistakes as being straight, and shows discomfort towards Emory's flamboyant behavior. Michael takes Alan to his bedroom to discuss Alan's urgent conversation, but Alan dodges his questions.

A hustler called "Cowboy" arrives earlier than Emory expected and mistakes Michael for Harold, kissing him on the lips. Alan descends from the upstairs bathroom and announces he's leaving. Emory chides him for being a closeted homosexual which results in Alan punching Emory and calling him a "faggot." Harold arrives high on marijuana and accepts Cowboy's gift of a passionate kiss.

Michael begins to drink and smoke despite having quit 5 weeks prior. He and Harold trade vicious insults as Hank helps a vomiting Alan in Michael's bathroom. Emory brings out Harold's birthday cake and presents. After opening them on the terrace, a thunderstorm forces everyone inside.

Alan tries to leave again but is stopped by Michael, who informs everyone that they are playing a party game: everyone must use the telephone to call the one person they truly believe they love. Michael creates a points system based on how far each one can get in their conversations with their true loves. Bernard calls the son of his mother's employer, with whom he had a sexual encounter as a teenager. After his call goes awry, he only earns 2 points.

Emory solemnly calls a dentist he had a crush on in high school but his call ends abruptly, earning him 3 points. Hank calls his answering service at home and leaves a message for Larry, earning him 7 points. Larry loudly disagrees with Hank about the insistence on monogamy in their relationship, leading Michael to deduce that Donald and Larry have had sex in the past. Larry uses the kitchen phone to call Hank in the living room. His tearful declaration of love earns him 10 points. Hank and Larry go upstairs to Michael's room.

Michael angrily confronts Alan about his closeted relationship in college with a boy named Justin. Alan makes a phone call to who Michael believes is Justin but turns out to be Alan's wife Fran. Alan tells her he loves her and is coming home to Washington. He earns 10 points and leaves as Michael stands defeated.

Harold informs Michael that no matter what Michael does, he will always be a homosexual, just like the rest of them. He departs, taking Cowboy and his presents with him. Emory leaves with a distraught Bernard, promising to sober him up on the way home. Michael laments over the group's treatment of each other, wishing "if we could just not hate ourselves so much." He tells Donald that he never learned what Alan wanted to confide in him.

As midnight nears, Michael attends Mass at St. Malachy's. Donald reads The Golden Notebook on Michael's couch, despite his earlier insistence he would not be spending the night. Harold and Cowboy ride in a taxi to Harold's home, Emory and Bernard sit at a late-night diner enjoying coffee and buttered toast, Hank and Larry have sex in Michael's bedroom, and Alan sits at a bar drinking alone. Michael exits Mass; his walk turns into a run as he heads down the street.

== Cast ==
- Jim Parsons as Michael, the host and catalyst for most of the drama of the play; Harold's "smartly groomed" "frenemy"
- Zachary Quinto as Harold, whose birthday is being celebrated. He is an "ugly, pock-marked Jew fairy", in the character's own words, who is becoming increasingly morose about losing his youthful looks and his ability to attract attractive young men
- Matt Bomer as Donald, Michael's conflicted friend who has moved from the city to the Hamptons to spurn the homosexual "lifestyle", and is undergoing psychoanalysis; he has "wholesome American good looks"
- Andrew Rannells as Larry, an "extremely handsome" commercial artist who prefers multiple sex partners
- Charlie Carver as Cowboy, an attractive blond hustler who is "not too bright" and "too pretty", and arrives as one of Harold's birthday presents
- Robin de Jesús as Emory, a flamboyant and effeminate interior decorator
- Brian Hutchison as Alan McCarthy, Michael's married, "aristocratic" and "Anglo-Saxon" college friend and roommate; an unexpected party guest. He is visiting New York and is anxious to tell Michael something, but hesitant to do so in front of the others. It is suggested that he once had homosexual affairs while in college, but his sexual orientation is never explicitly stated, leaving it to audience's interpretation.
- Michael Benjamin Washington as Bernard, an African-American librarian who still pines for the wealthy white boy in whose house his mother worked as a maid.
- Tuc Watkins as Hank, Larry's live-in boyfriend who has been married to a woman from whom he is separated and is divorcing; he "passes" as straight and disagrees with Larry on the issue of monogamy.

== Production ==
On April 18, 2019, Ryan Murphy announced that the play The Boys in the Band would be adapted for Netflix, as part of his US$300 million deal with the streaming platform. Murphy had previously revived the play for Broadway in 2018 and confirmed the director of the revival, Joe Mantello, would direct the film. David Stone and Ned Martel were announced as producers alongside Murphy. It was also confirmed that the entire cast of the 2018 Broadway revival would reprise their roles for the film, making the film have a cast of entirely openly gay actors.

Principal photography began in July 2019 in Los Angeles. The film was dedicated to the memory of Mart Crowley who died on March 7, 2020.

The play contains two uses of the racist slur nigger, spoken by Parsons' character Michael, as well as other homophobic and antisemitic slurs, which the film adaptation retains. Parsons stated that "none of those words were ever uttered by me without a severe amount of trepidation and a sick feeling in your stomach going into it", but were important to "make the audience feel the discomfort of the marginalization of the gay community at the time". Matt Bomer said, of performing the play on-stage, that "I heard a guttural gasp the first time one of these slurs was used that I remembered and realized how powerful they really are".

In an interview ahead of the Netflix premiere, director Joe Mantello told the Associated Press: "I do not believe the erasure of things that make us uncomfortable is progress ... My responsibility is to the story. And the story is: This the cost of oppression, it allows you to act in a way that is inhumane. And I felt in order to be honest to that, that you’re true to that, that it was essential that we keep it.

Michael Benjamin Washington, the only Black member of the cast, pointed out that:

If you’re setting a play in 1968 and you have a Black character and we’re gonna pretend like he’s not black, then you’re not telling the truth. Just as if I wrote a play about 2020, but Black Lives Matter doesn’t happen.

== Release ==
The film was released on Netflix on September 30, 2020.

On the same day the film was available for streaming, a 30-minute mini-documentary was also released, directed by Joel Kazuo Knoernschild with Mart Crowley reflecting on the legacy of the story.

== Reception ==
On review aggregator Rotten Tomatoes, the film holds an approval rating of 84% based on 99 reviews, with an average rating of 7.2/10. The site's critics' consensus reads: "The Boys in the Band brings the classic stage play back to the screen with a well-acted adaptation containing surprising — and poignant — modern relevance." On Metacritic, the film has a weighted average score of 70 out of 100 based on 19 critics, indicating "generally favorable" reviews.

Owen Gleiberman of Variety praised the performances, saying "What holds the movie together, apart from Quinto's dreamy geek mystique and delectable delivery of every line, is the tormented passion that Jim Parsons brings to it." David Rooney of The Hollywood Reporter gave the film a positive review and wrote: "The Boys in the Band in many ways is dated and formulaic. But it's also very much alive, an invaluable record of the destructive force of societal rejection, even in a bastion of liberal acceptance like New York City. Despite its flaws, this consistently engaging film provides a vital window for young queer audiences into the difficult lives of their forebears."

In a mixed review, Odie Henderson of RogerEbert.com gave the film 2 1/2 stars out of 4, writing "Even though it’s a period piece, it’s still designed to evoke the same feelings in the current gay or bisexual viewer and to start the same important conversations about who we are and what we feel... I prefer, and recommend, the original, but I’m on the fence about this one. Your mileage may vary."

=== Accolades ===
The Boys in the Band was awarded The Film Award at the ninth annual Virgin Atlantic Attitude Awards. It also was awarded the 2021 GLAAD Media Award for Outstanding Film (Limited Release).

== See also ==
- LGBT culture in New York City
- List of LGBTQ people from New York City
- List of Netflix original films
