= I Think I Do =

- Film poster
- Directed by: Brian Sloan
- Written by: Brian Sloan
- Produced by: Lane Janger
- Starring: Alexis Arquette; Maddie Corman; Guillermo Díaz; Marianne Hagan; Jamie Harrold; Christian Maelen; Marni Nixon; Lauren Vélez; Tuc Watkins
- Cinematography: Milton Kam
- Edited by: François Kraudren
- Production companies: Danger Filmworks; House of Pain Productions
- Distributed by: Strand Releasing
- Release date: June 20, 1997
- Running time: 90 minutes
- Country: United States
- Language: English
- Box office: $345,478

I Think I Do is a 1997 American gay-themed romantic comedy film written and directed by Brian Sloan and starring Alexis Arquette. It premiered on June 20, 1997 at the San Francisco International Lesbian and Gay Film Festival, and was also shown at the Toronto International Film Festival later that year, before receiving a small theatrical run on April 10, 1998.

The film was restored and re-released for its 25th anniversary on April 19, 2024.

== Premise ==
The film follows the relationship between Bob and Brendan, roommates at George Washington University in Washington, D.C., five years after Bob made his romantic feelings toward Brendan known. When the two reconnect at the wedding of college friends, Bob is in a serious relationship with a soap opera star Sterling Scott, while Brendan is single and re-examining his own identity.

== Cast ==
- Alexis Arquette as Bob
- Christian Maelen as Brendan
- Lauren Vélez as Carol Gonzalez
- Tuc Watkins as Sterling Scott
- Jamie Harrold as Matt Lynch
- Guillermo Díaz as Eric
- Maddie Corman as Beth
- Marianne Hagan as Sarah
- Elizabeth Rodriguez as Celia Gonzalez
- Patricia Mauceri as Barbara Rivera
- Marni Nixon as Aunt Alice
- Mateo Gómez as Mr. Gonzalez
- Arden Myrin as Wendy
- Richard Salamanca as Fr. Paulsen
- Leonard Berdick as Mr. McPherson
- Lane Janger as wedding bartender

== Production ==
In an interview with IndieWire, director Brian Sloan said, "I wrote a ten page treatment first and from there I started writing the script. It took me about three weeks to get the first draft. I get very nervous sitting at the computer and not doing anything, so I work very fast when I actually sit down to work. Then in the course of three years, I went through ten drafts. The hardest thing about going through ten drafts during that time was to get all the characters to connect. To find a balance between all the couples and to make the different story lines work together." Filming would take place in New Jersey and Washington, D.C.

== Reception ==
I Think I Do grossed $345,478 while in theaters during 1998, only having been released in 10 theaters. On Rotten Tomatoes, the film holds a rating of 42% from 31 reviews. In her review, Anita Gates of The New York Times claimed that the film requires "a taste for pointed, topical humor and a particular brand of clever conversation" and that "The characters are uniformly funny and sympathetic, and you want all of them to find the right person and be happy."
