= Vino Veritas =

- Film poster
- Directed by: Sarah Knight
- Written by: David MacGregor
- Based on: Vino Veritas by David MacGregor
- Produced by: Chad Bishoff; Sarah Knight; David MacGregor
- Starring: Carrie Preston
- Cinematography: John Beymer
- Edited by: Mark Sult
- Production companies: Blue Frog Films; Jo Films
- Distributed by: Gravitas Ventures
- Release date: July 28, 2013 (Woods Hole)
- Running time: 96 minutes
- Country: United States
- Language: English

Vino Veritas is a 2013 American independent dark comedy film directed by Sarah Knight and starring Carrie Preston. It is based on David MacGregor's play of the same name.

== Cast ==
- Carrie Preston as Claire
- Bernard White as Ridley
- Brian Hutchison as Phil
- Heather Raffo as Lauren

== Plot ==
On Halloween night, two couples meet at one of their houses for drinks and hors d'oeuvres before planning on heading out to a massive party. Dressed in their finest costumes (witch, cowboy, doctor, and Queen Elizabeth I), the hostess brings out a bottle of blue wine she picked up in Peru. Based on an old Inca recipe, the wine supposedly has truth-telling properties and is brewed from the skins of blue dart tree frogs. Three of the four drink the wine and the conversation begins to take odd turns. Some of the "truths" are harmless enough, but progressively get darker and more disturbing. It gradually becomes clear that the marriage of one of the couples is disintegrating due to a lack of truthfulness, and the other marriage is only held together by lies.

== Production ==
According to Preston, the film was shot in Lincoln, Nebraska the hometown of director Knight.

== Reception ==
The film opened to positive reviews. Mark Adams of Screen Daily wrote, “A smartly and slickly made indie drama, cleverly adapted by playwright David MacGregor from his own production and blessed with four fine performances. Director Sarah Knight keeps ‘Vino Veritas’ moving nicely, and makes good use of her interiors that help belie the film’s stagey origins.” L. Kent Wolgamott of the Lincoln Journal Star penned, “‘Vino Veritas’ never feels ‘stagey.’ That’s a measure of the quality of MacGregor’s adaptation, Knight’s direction, John Beymer’s cinematography and the acting.” Tom Long of Detroit News wrote, “It's highly entertaining if occasionally (and appropriately) cringe-inducing and offers some fine actors the opportunity to strut their stuff. And that's the truth, sans vino.”
