= Skyscraper (play) =

Play by David Auburn

Skyscraper is the first full-length play by David Auburn. It premiered Off-Broadway in 1997. It is a serious comedy about the deterioration of ingenuity and art.

== Production ==
Skyscraper ran Off-Broadway at Greenwich House from September 20, 1997 through October 26, 1997. The play was produced by The Araca Group. Directed by Michael Rego, the cast featured John Wylie (Louis), Marianne Hagan (Vivian), Jeffrey Donovan, Nina Landey, Andrew Sgroi and Jenna Stern. The play was written during Auburn's time as a Juilliard Fellow and was re-worked during his Juilliard residency in 1993-95; the play had a workshop presentation at the Berkshire Theatre Festival (Massachusetts).

The play takes place in Chicago, Illinois, where several people are attempting to save an historic skyscraper from being demolished.

== Critical reception ==
The CurtainUp reviewer wrote: "At its comedic best 'Skyscraper' gently satirizes the less enlightened city planners' tendency to tear down edifices of historic and artistic significance... The play has too many serious undertones to quite fit its advance billing as a romantic comedy. A more accurate description would be serio-comedy with a generous dash of reality-based fantasy."

Peter Marks, in his review for The New York Times, wrote: " Skyscraper, in fact, fairly teems with intriguing notions. But none of them, ultimately, amount to much. Mr. Auburn has expended all of his energy on the structure of Skyscraper without paying enough attention to the people who inhabit it. As a result, the play, under the direction of Michael Rego, is as rigorous -- and emotionally arid -- as a master's thesis."

The Variety reviewer wrote: " Skyscraper at first appears to be a zany romantic comedy but soon head[s] down a dark avenue of memory and fantasy. Playwright David Auburn skillfully introduces an oddly balanced group of characters whose lives merge on the rooftop of an old Chicago building marked for demolition. With a teasing and unpredictable narrative, the well-tuned ensemble carries the crisp humor through a deepening mystery."
