= Lane Janger =

American film producer

Lane Janger is an American independent film producer, director, writer, and actor. He was born in Los Angeles, California and obtained a Master of Fine Arts in filmmaking at the New York University.

In 1999, he was the star, co-writer, director and producer of Just One Time, which became part of Boys Life 3 in 2000.

== Personal life ==
Janger was previously in a relationship with David Burtka, until they split in 2003. Janger has fraternal twins, a boy and a girl, born in 2000 via surrogate.

== Filmography ==
- 1994: I Like It Like That ... producer
- 1997: I Think I Do ... producer
- 1999: Just One Time ... actor, writer, director, and producer

Shorts

- 1998: Just One Time ... actor, writer, director, and producer, an 8-minute short on which the later full feature film was based.
