= The Girl in the Park =

- Directed by: David Auburn
- Written by: David Auburn
- Produced by: Bryan Furst; Sean Furst; Dale Rosenbloom; Joseph Zolfo
- Starring: Sigourney Weaver; Kate Bosworth; Elias Koteas; Alessandro Nivola; Keri Russell
- Cinematography: Stuart Dryburgh
- Music by: Theodore Shapiro
- Distributed by: Yari Film Group
- Release dates: September 9, 2007 (Toronto International Film Festival); July 16, 2008 (United States)
- Running time: 110 minutes
- Country: United States
- Language: English

The Girl in the Park is a 2007 drama film, the first directed by David Auburn, screenwriter of Proof (2005) and The Lake House (2006). It stars Sigourney Weaver, Kate Bosworth and Keri Russell.

== Plot ==
Since the disappearance of her three-year-old daughter 16 years ago, Julia (Weaver) has cut herself off from everyone, including her husband and son. But when she meets Louise (Bosworth), a troubled young woman with a checkered past, all of Julia's old psychological wounds resurface, manifested as an irrational hope that Louise may be her lost daughter.

== Cast ==
- Sigourney Weaver as Julia Sandburg
- Kate Bosworth as Louise
- Alessandro Nivola as Chris
- Keri Russell as Celeste
- David Rasche as Doug
- Elias Koteas as Raymond
- Curtiss Cook as Park Cop

== Filming ==
Filming began in New York City on November 13, 2006, and was scheduled to end on December 21, 2006. The film was premiered at the Toronto International Film Festival on September 9, 2007.

== Reception ==
On review aggregator Rotten Tomatoes, the film holds an approval rating of 71% based on 14 reviews, with an average rating of 5.68/10. The website's critics consensus reads: "Sigourney Weaver delivers a towering performance in this poignant meditation on unresolved grief." Jason Solomons of the Guardian "likes this deceptive drama, its tensions and releases, its symbolic use of Scrabble to denote cohesion and confusion and its dark fears of parenting, children, ageing, loss and connection."
