= Rick (film) =

- Theatrical release poster
- Directed by: Curtiss Clayton
- Written by: Daniel Handler
- Based on: Rigoletto by Giuseppe Verdi
- Produced by: Ruth Charny; Jim Czarnecki; Sofia Sondervan
- Starring: Bill Pullman; Aaron Stanford; Agnes Bruckner; Dylan Baker; Sandra Oh
- Cinematography: Lisa Rinzler
- Edited by: Curtiss Clayton
- Music by: Ted Reichman
- Production companies: ContentFilm; The 7th Floor
- Distributed by: Vitagraph Films
- Release dates: September 6, 2003 (TIFF); September 15, 2004 (United States)
- Running time: 93 minutes
- Country: United States
- Language: English
- Box office: $11,991

Rick is a 2003 American comedy drama film directed and edited by Curtiss Clayton (in his feature directorial debut) and written by Daniel Handler, based on the 1851 opera Rigoletto by Giuseppe Verdi, itself based on the 1832 play Le roi s'amuse by Victor Hugo. The film stars Bill Pullman, Aaron Stanford, Agnes Bruckner, Dylan Baker, and Sandra Oh.

== Plot ==
The film chronicles the tragic fall of Rick O'Lette, a middle-aged corporate climber who has lost sight of his humanity.

== Cast ==
- Bill Pullman as Rick O'Lette
- Aaron Stanford as Duke
- Agnes Bruckner as Eve O'Lette
- Dylan Baker as Buck
- Sandra Oh as Michelle
- Emmanuelle Chriqui as Duke's Long-Suffering Wife
- Marianne Hagan as Laura
- Jamie Harris as Mick
- Haviland Morris as Jane
- Paz de la Huerta as Vicki
- Dennis Parlato as BusinessTalk Anchor
- Daniel Handler (cameo) as Perky waiter

== Reception ==
=== Critical response ===
The review aggregator website Rotten Tomatoes reported an approval rating of 46%, with an average rating of 6/10, based on 24 reviews.
