= What Do You Believe About The Future? =

One-act play by David Auburn

- Original language: English
- Written by: David Auburn in 1996

Premiere
- Date: 1996

What Do You Believe About The Future? is a short one act play written by David Auburn where ten numbered (but not named) characters answer the title's question. The play was first performed in 1996 as part of a revue of plays by Auburn and David Mamet entitled "Two Davids." The production was directed by Carl Forsman. The characters are teenagers and the philosophical chat takes place late at night chat during a co-ed sleepover.
