= David Auburn =

American playwright and director

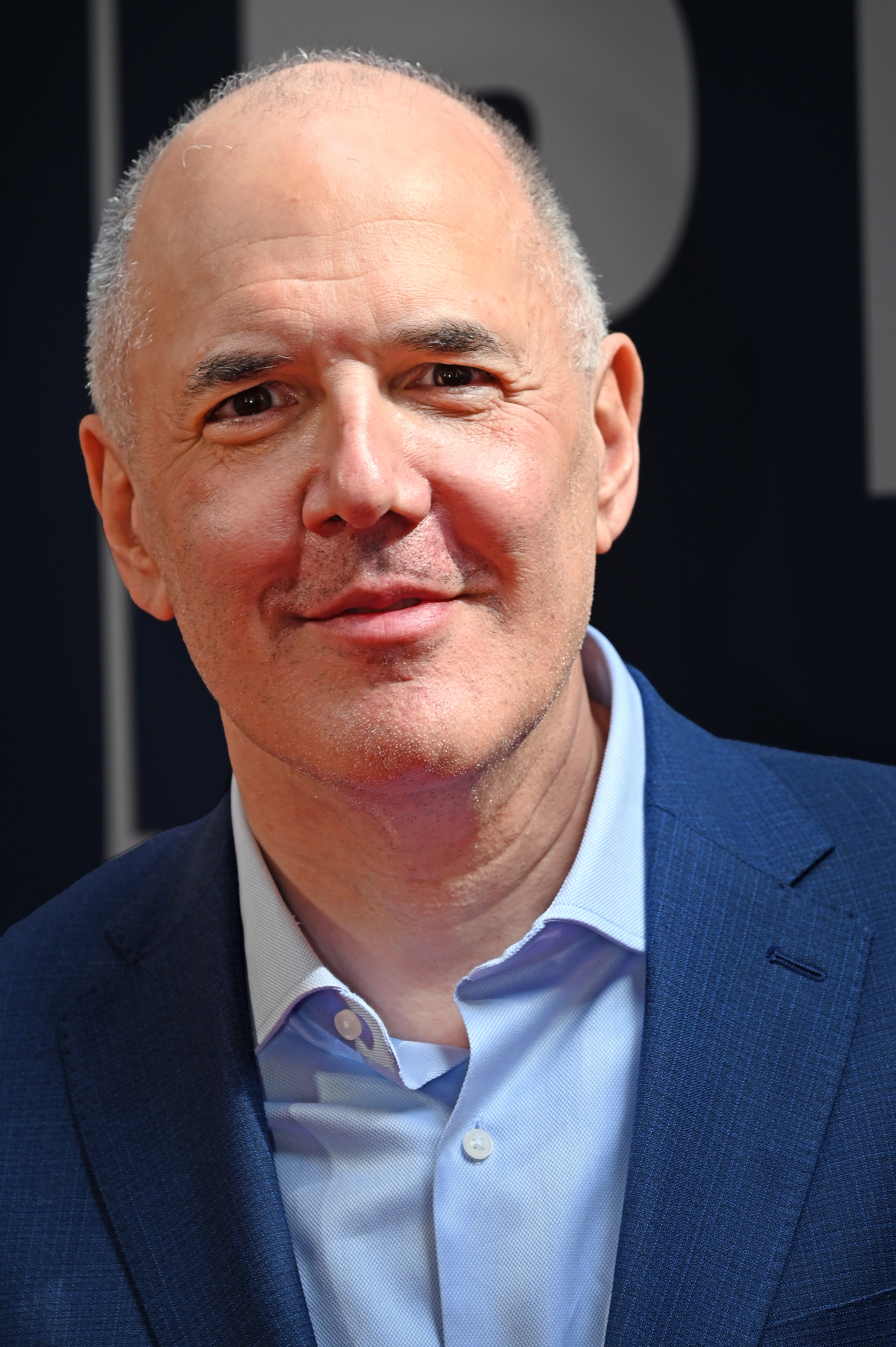
- Auburn in 2026
- Born: November 30, 1969 (age 56); Chicago, Illinois, U.S.
- Education: University of Chicago (BA); Juilliard School (GrDip)
- Occupations: Playwright, screenwriter, theatre director
- Children: 2

David Auburn (born November 30, 1969) is an American playwright, screenwriter, and theatre director. He is best known for his 2000 play Proof, which won the 2001 Tony Award for Best Play and Pulitzer Prize for Drama. He also wrote the screenplays for the 2005 film version of Proof, The Lake House (2006), The Girl in the Park (2007), and Georgetown (2019).

== Early life ==
Auburn was born in Chicago, Illinois, to parents Mark and Sandy Auburn. He was raised in Ohio until 1982, when his family moved to Arkansas. After graduating from high school in 1987, he attended the University of Chicago, where he was a member of Off-Off Campus, and received a bachelor of arts degree in English literature in 1991. Following a one-year fellowship with Amblin Entertainment, he moved to New York City in 1992. Auburn spent two years in the Juilliard School's playwriting program, studying under noted dramatists Marsha Norman and Christopher Durang.

== Career ==
Auburn wrote several short plays, collectively grouped as Fifth Planet and Other Plays. The plays, called "cockeyed and engaging little one-act comedies", were presented at Beowulf Alley Theatre Company, Tucson, Arizona, in January and February 2008. The plays are: Fifth Planet, Miss You, Are You Ready, Damage Control, Three Monologues, What Do You Believe About The Future? and We Had A Very Good Time. Fifth Planet is a two-person play with 44 short scenes. Miss You is a "telephone play about love and unfaithfulness" with a two-person cast, with each actor playing 2 roles, named "man" and "woman". We Had A Very Good Time follows a married couple at the end of a vacation in an unnamed foreign country. Damage Control concerns a political consultant preparing his political boss for a speech about a scandal the politician is involved in. What Do You Believe About The Future? appeared in Harper's Magazine and has since been adapted for the screen.

Auburn's first full-length play, Skyscraper, ran off-Broadway in September – October 1997. It concerns a group attempting to save an historic skyscraper from being demolished.

Auburn is best known for his 2000 play Proof, which won the 2001 Tony Award for Best Play, as well as the 2001 Pulitzer Prize for Drama. He adapted it into a film, which was released in 2005.

His play The Columnist had its world premiere in a production by the Manhattan Theatre Club on Broadway, running from April 3, 2012, through June 3, 2012 and starring John Lithgow with Boyd Gaines, Margaret Colin, Stephen Kunken, Marc Bonan, Grace Gummer, and Brian J. Smith, with direction by Daniel Sullivan. Lost Lake premiered Off-Broadway in a Manhattan Theatre Club production at New York City Center—Stage 1, running from November 11 to December 21, 2014. Directed by Daniel Sullivan, the two-person cast starred John Hawkes and Tracie Thoms. The play was developed at the Eugene O’Neill Playwrights Conference and presented at the Sullivan Project at the University of Illinois in February 2014. The first reading of Lost Lake was done at the O'Neill Center Rose Theater Barn July 26–27, 2013, directed by Wendy C. Goldberg and starring Frank Wood and Elsa Davis.

Auburn has been awarded the Helen Merrill Playwriting Award and a Guggenheim Fellowship. He received the Kesselring Prize in 2000 for Proof; the prize is given to a playwright who shows the most promise and comes with a $10,000 monetary award.

Following Proof, he wrote the screenplay for the movie The Lake House, released by Warner Bros. in 2006. In 2007, he made his film directorial debut with The Girl in the Park, for which he also wrote the screenplay. He has also directed stage works. He directed the play Sick by Zayd Dohrn at the Berkshire Theatre Festival from August 18 to September 6, 2009. He directed Anna Christie by Eugene O'Neill at the Berkshire Theatre Festival in July 2013. He directed the play Side Effects by Michael Weller in June and July 2011 at the Off-Broadway MCC Theater.

== Personal life ==
Auburn currently resides in Manhattan, New York. He has a wife and two daughters.

== Plays ==
- Damage Control
- Three Monologues
- We Had A Very Good Time
- Fifth Planet (1995) – New York Stage and Film Festival, Poughkeepsie, New York, July 17, 1995
- What Do You Believe About The Future? (1996)
- Miss You (1997) – HBO Comedy Arts Festival, Aspen, Colorado, January 5, 1997
- Skyscraper (1997)
- Proof (2000)
- Are You Ready? (2001) – Westbank Theatre, New York City, January 29, 2001
- tick, tick...BOOM! (2001) (Script consultant)
- The Columnist (2012)
- Lost Lake (2014)
- Summer, 1976 (2023)

== Screenplays ==
- Proof (2005)
- The Lake House (2006)
- The Girl in the Park (2007) (also director)
- Georgetown (2019)
- Charlie's Angels (2019) (story only)
