= Andrew Rannells =

American actor (born 1978)

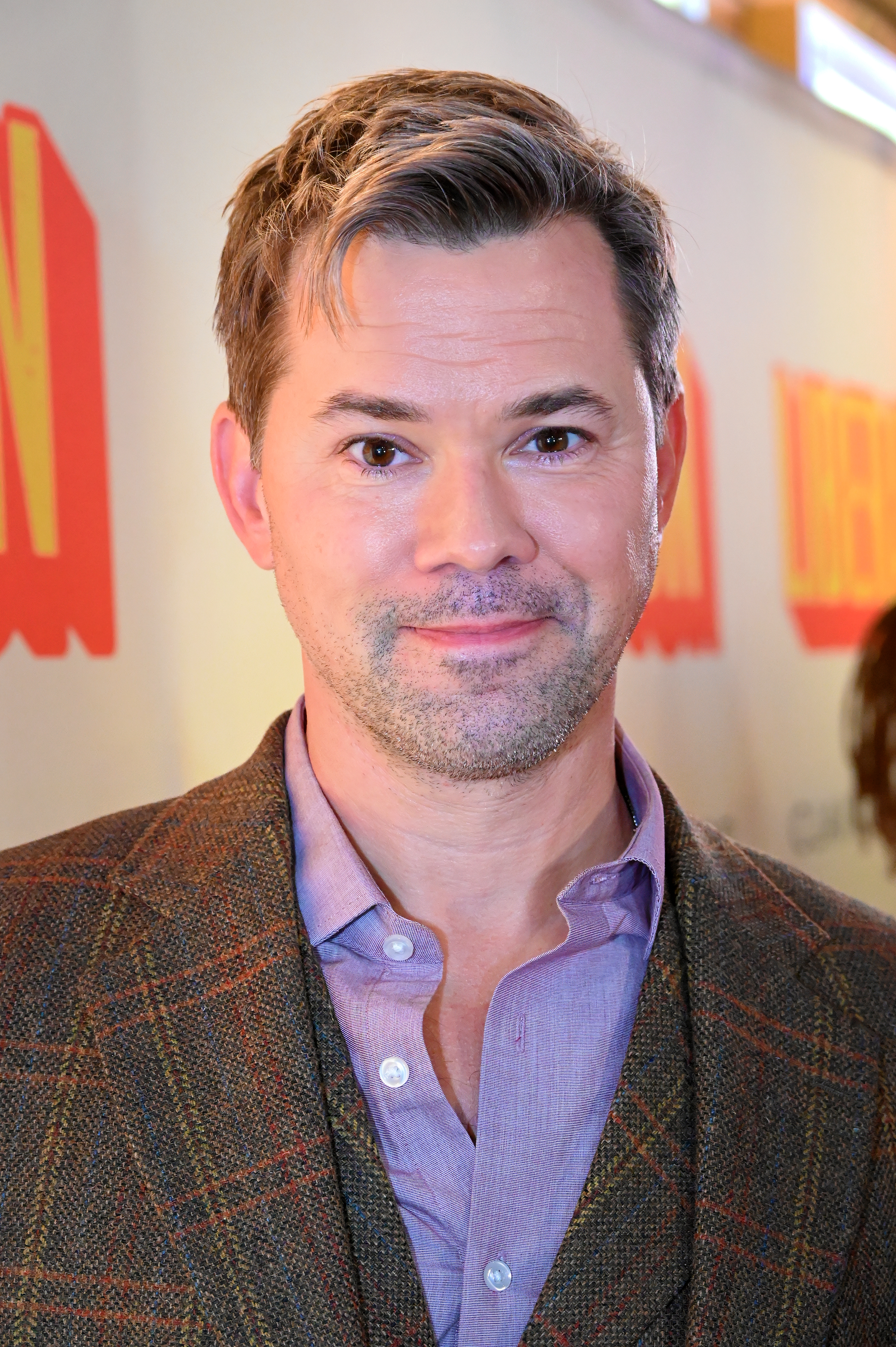
- Rannells in 2025
- Born: Andrew Scott Rannells; August 23, 1978 (age 48); Omaha, Nebraska, U.S.
- Education: Marymount Manhattan College
- Occupation: Actor
- Years active: 1994–present
- Partner: Tuc Watkins (2019–present)

Andrew Scott Rannells (born August 23, 1978) is an American actor. He is best known for originating the role of Elder Kevin Price in the 2011 Broadway musical The Book of Mormon, for which he was nominated for the Tony Award for Best Actor in a Musical and won the 2012 Grammy Award for Best Musical Theater Album. He received his second Tony nomination, for Best Featured Actor in a Musical, in 2017 for his performance as Whizzer in the 2016 Broadway revival of Falsettos. Other Broadway credits include Hairspray (2005), Jersey Boys (2009), Hedwig and the Angry Inch (2014), Hamilton (2015), The Boys in the Band (2018), and Gutenberg! The Musical! (2023). For his performance in the off West End production of Tammy Faye, he was nominated for a Laurence Olivier Award.

In the 2010s, he began working as a screen actor; most notably, he starred in the 2012 NBC sitcom The New Normal and played the recurring role of Elijah in HBO's Girls (2012–2017). In 2019, he began starring in Black Monday on Showtime. He has accumulated numerous voice acting credits since the beginning of his career including Matthew MacDell on Netflix's Big Mouth and William Clockwell on Amazon Prime's Invincible.

== Early life and education ==
Rannells was born in Omaha, Nebraska, to Charlotte and Ronald Rannells. He is the fourth of five siblings, with three sisters and an older brother. Rannells attended Our Lady of Lourdes grade school in Omaha, and then Creighton Preparatory School, an all-boys Roman Catholic school in Omaha. He left the Catholic Church upon graduating as he was sexually abused by a priest at his high school. His family lived in the Hanscom Park neighborhood in Omaha.

As a child, he took classes at the Emmy Gifford Children's Theater and performed at the Omaha Community Playhouse and the Firehouse Dinner Theatre and the Dundee Dinner Theatre. Rannells was 11 when he acted in his first play. He did community theater with fellow Omahan and Creighton Prep alumnus Conor Oberst. He did voice-over work and commercials, including a 1996 Grease spoof with Amy Adams.

He is a 1997 YoungArts alumnus, together with Zuzanna Szadkowski and Michael Benjamin Washington.

Rannells moved to New York City in 1997 after graduating from high school, studying theater at Marymount Manhattan College for two years before he started auditioning full-time and began landing roles.

== Career ==
=== 1994–2002: Early career and voice acting ===
Active in community theater, Rannells got his start as a professional actor as a teenager through voice acting. In the mid-1990s, he found work with the animation production company DIC Entertainment through an Omaha casting call. He was subsequently cast in a number of their television productions in main voice roles. He continued to work in the medium for a number of years while pursuing theater. Rannells worked with the New York City-based production company 4Kids Entertainment from 2001 to 2004 and did voice acting for several English dubs of anime series such as Pokémon and Yu-Gi-Oh!, in addition to serving as voice director for the dubs of Kirby: Right Back at Ya! and Sonic X.

One of his first theater roles was as the character James in the touring production of Pokémon Live! from September 2000 to January 2001. When asked about his experience in 2014, he jokingly said that he would have rather starred in a porn film or snuff film instead and that he only took the job for the pay.

In his 2019 memoir Too Much Is Not Enough: A Memoir of Fumbling Toward Adulthood, Rannells admitted that playing James on Pokémon Live! was a miserable experience, as he found the character to be an offensive depiction of a gay man. Being a gay man himself, he felt the role was not only a hurtful insult towards his orientation, but also a bad role model for any gay kid who watched the show when it was on tour. He also admitted that he only starred in the show because he was broke and needed the paycheck.

Before winning his first Broadway role, Rannells had parts in a number of regional theater productions, including Hedwig and the Angry Inch, Miss Saigon, and Thoroughly Modern Millie. For his turn as Hedwig at the Zachary Scott Theater Center in Austin, Texas, in 2002, he won best actor in a musical at the B. Iden Payne Awards in September 2002, which honor outstanding achievements in Austin theater.

=== 2005–2012: Broadway debut and The Book of Mormon ===
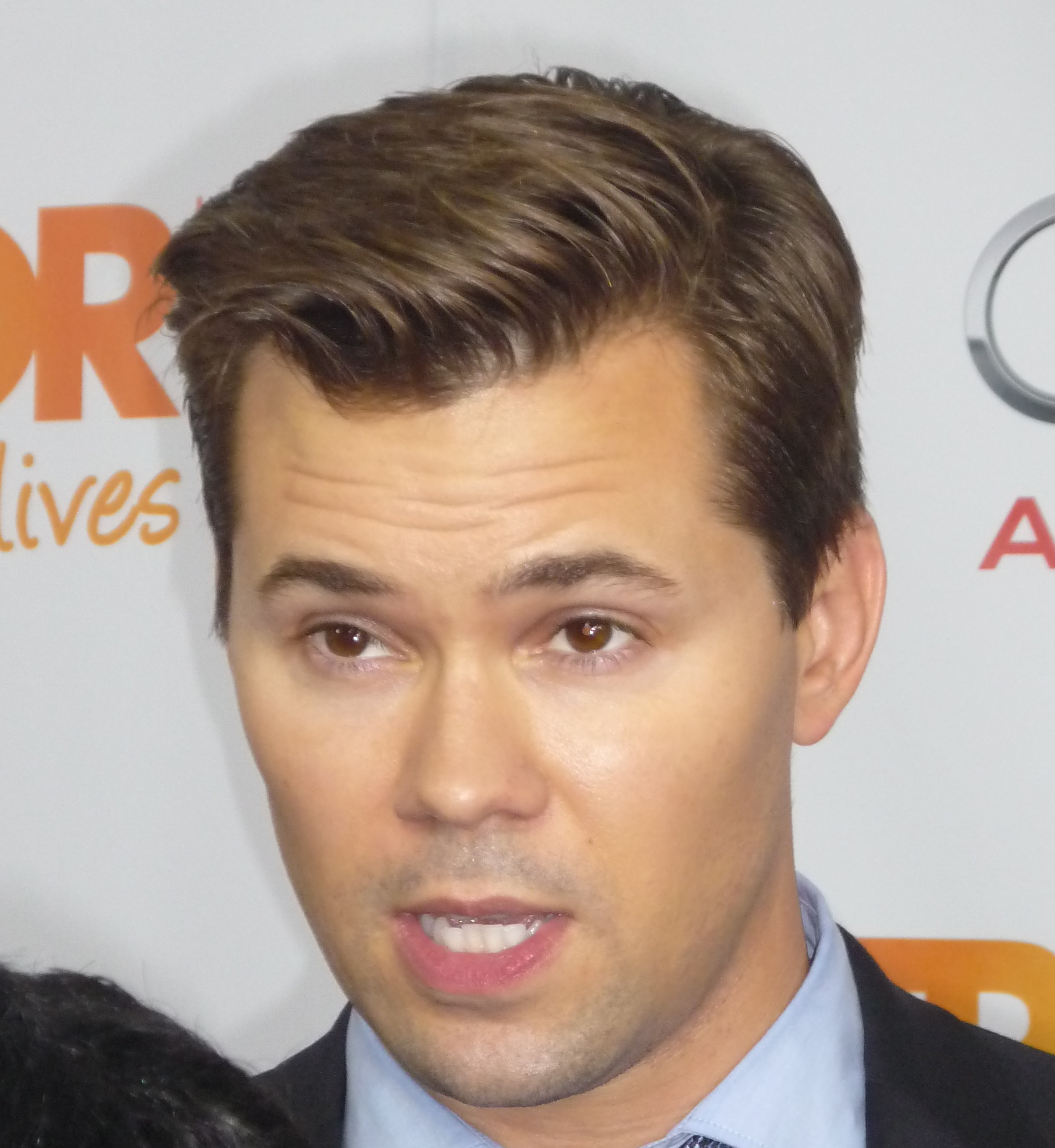
Rannells in 2009

In 2005, Rannells made his Broadway debut when he first understudied and then assumed the role of Link Larkin in the Broadway production of Hairspray.

He followed this with some regional performances. He played Bob Gaudio in the First National Tour of Jersey Boys. His last performance with the tour was on December 6, 2008, in Toronto. In January 2009, he reprised the role of Gaudio in the musical's Broadway production.

In 2011, Rannells originated the role of Elder Price in The Book of Mormon, a musical written by South Park creators Trey Parker and Matt Stone and Avenue Q composer Robert Lopez. For his performance, he was nominated for the Tony Award for Best Leading Actor in a Musical. He won the Grammy Award for Best Musical Theater Album for his performance in the musical's Original Broadway Cast Recording. His last performance was June 10, 2012.

=== 2012–present: Work in television and theater ===
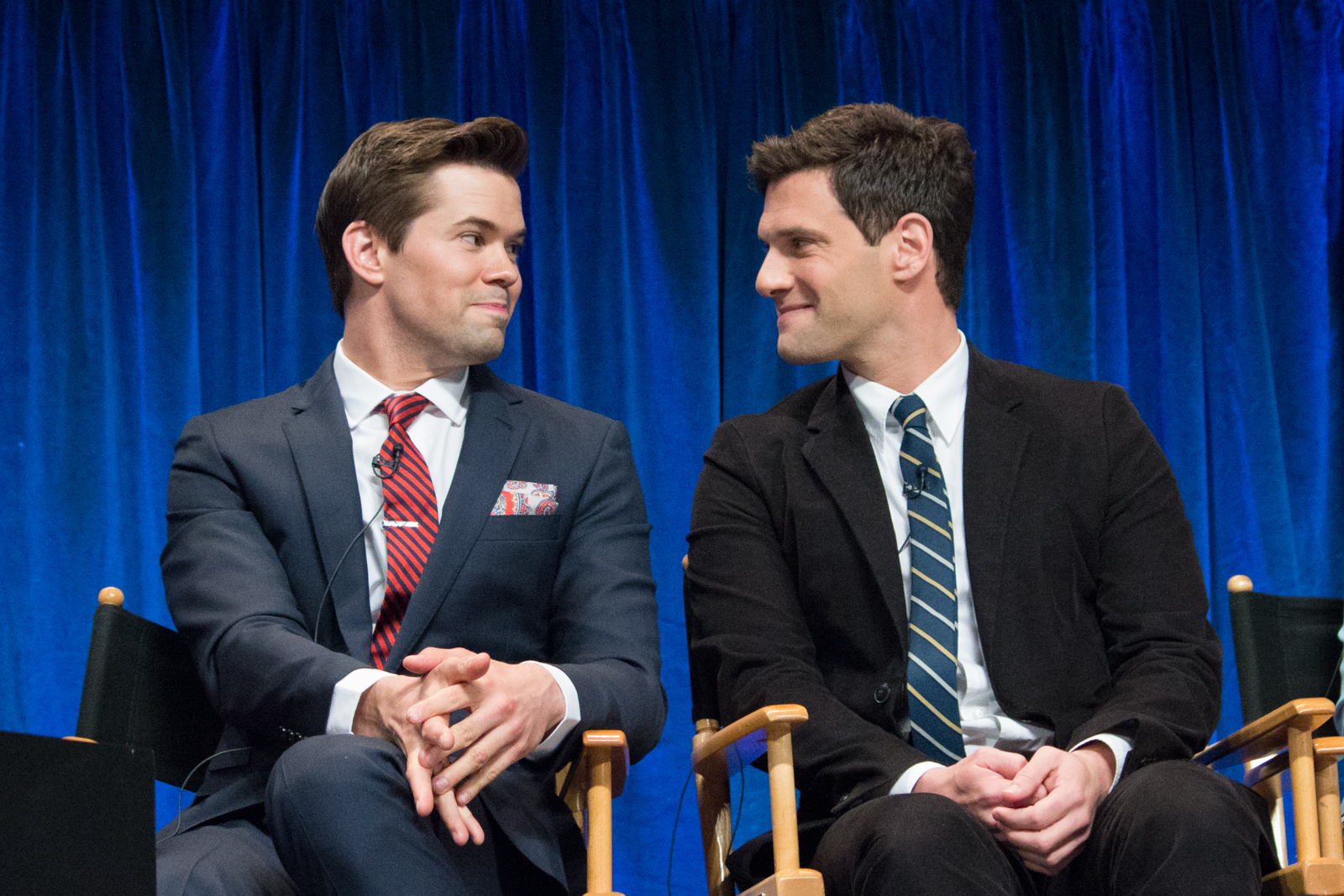
Rannells and Justin Bartha at Paleyfest in 2013

Rannells played a stripper in the 2012 film Bachelorette and played a lead character, Bryan Collins, in the 2012–13 television series The New Normal. In one of his best-known roles, he played the recurring role of Elijah on the HBO television series Girls.

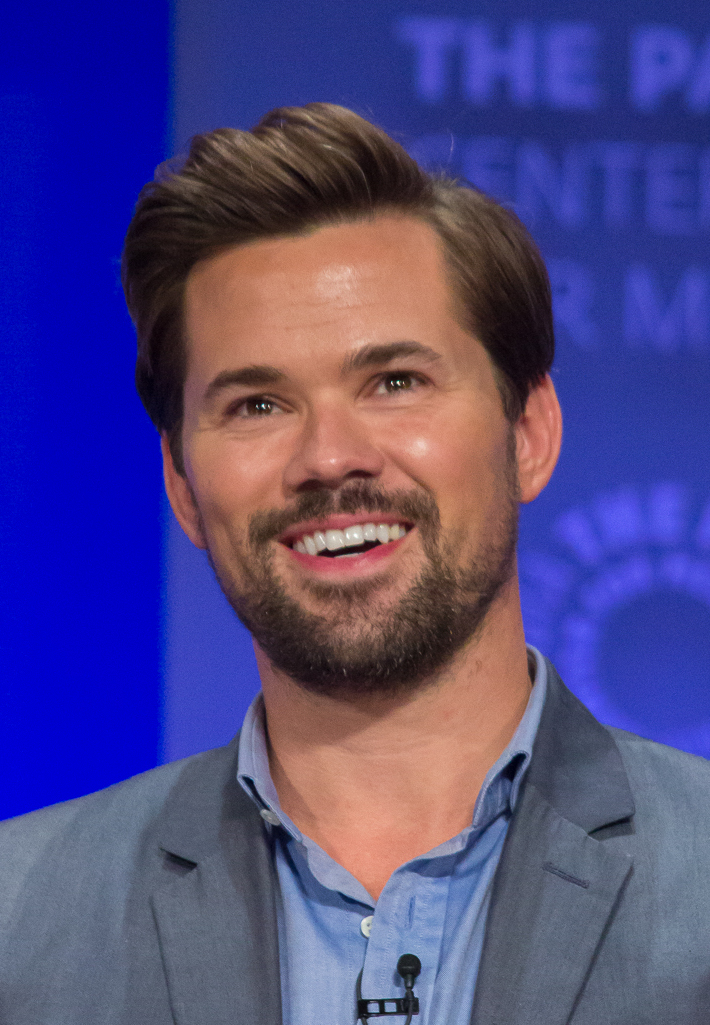
Rannells in 2015

In 2015 Universal Pictures acquired a comedy that was to be written by Rannells with Mike Doyle and produced by Judd Apatow. He temporarily replaced Jonathan Groff in the role of King George III in Hamilton on Broadway from October 27 to November 29, 2015, while Groff fulfilled pre-arranged filming commitments.

Rannells played the role of Whizzer Brown in the Broadway revival of Falsettos directed by James Lapine. He was joined by Christian Borle and Stephanie J. Block who played Marvin and Trina, respectively. The musical ran from October 27, 2016 (with previews beginning September 29), to January 8, 2017. He was nominated for the Tony Award for Best Featured Actor in a Musical for his performance.

He played Larry in the 2018 Broadway revival of The Boys in the Band. It was a limited run, in honor of the play's 50th anniversary. It won a Tony Award for Best Revival of a Play. He revived his role (along with the rest of the revival cast) for the film adaptation for Netflix, which was released on September 30, 2020.

On the television show Black Monday Rannells played Blair Pfaff, one of the leading roles and was also a producer. The show premiered on January 20, 2019, on Showtime. In April 2019, the series was renewed for a second season that premiered on March 15, 2020. In October 2020, the series was renewed for a third season which premiered in 2021. In January 2022, it was confirmed by cast member Paul Scheer that the show was cancelled by Showtime.

During this period, he also returned to voice acting; notable credits include main roles in Netflix's Big Mouth (2017–2025) and Amazon's Invincible (2021–2025). He played Trent Oliver in Netflix's 2020 movie musical The Prom, an adaptation of the Broadway musical of the same name. Rannells' role in Invincible would latter be recast in the fourth season of the show, being replaced by Brandon Scott Jones.

In 2022 Rannells made his London stage debut originating the role of Jim Bakker in the musical Tammy Faye at the Almeida Theatre. He was nominated for a Laurence Olivier Award for Best Actor in a Musical in 2023. Originally announced to reprise this role for the Broadway transfer in the fall of 2024, he dropped out of the production after contract negotiations failed and was replaced by his Falsettos co-star Christian Borle.

He reunited with his The Book of Mormon co-star Josh Gad for a limited Broadway production of Gutenberg! The Musical! from September 15, 2023, to January 28, 2024.

Rannells published his first book, a memoir titled Too Much Is Not Enough, in 2019. It is a series of essays about his childhood in Omaha, Nebraska, and his years spent in New York leading up to his 2005 Broadway debut in Hairspray. His second book Uncle of the Year: & Other Debatable Triumphs, again a memoir in the form of essays, was released in 2023.

He made his directorial debut with season 2 episode 7 of Modern Love, titled "How Do You Remember Me?" He also wrote the episode, adapting an essay he wrote for the New York Times column (which appeared in his first memoir).

During an interview on a podcast called 4Kids Flashback, Rannells revealed that he was never called up to reprise his role as Tao Ren for the English dub of Shaman King.

In 2026, Rannells joined the cast of the dark comedy crime series Deli Boys, portraying district attorney Andrew Chadwater.

Rannells will return to Broadway in 2026, playing Jake Laurents/George Bailey in It's a Wonderful Life A Live Radio Play. alongside Megan Hilty and directed by Jerry Zaks.

== Personal life ==
Rannells is gay, mentioning that he had known about his sexual orientation since high school. He came out to his family when he was eighteen, but he stated that "by that point, no one was surprised". He also came out to his theater friends, but not his all-boys Catholic school.

Since 2019, he has been in a relationship with actor Tuc Watkins. The two met the year before while playing a couple in the Broadway production of The Boys in the Band. They reprised their roles for Netflix's film version of the show and also worked together on Black Monday in 2020.

He splits his time between New York and Los Angeles.

In an interview with Metro, he said his father died when Rannells was 22 years old.

== Filmography ==
=== Film ===
Year	Title	Role	Notes
2010	Sex and the City 2	Wedding Chorus	
2012	Bachelorette	Manny	
2015	The Intern	Cameron	
2016	Why Him?	Blaine Pederman	
2018	A Simple Favor	Darren	
2020	The Boys in the Band	Larry	
2020	The Prom	Trent Oliver	
2020	The Stand In	Nico	
2023	Our Son	Matthew	
2023	Trolls Band Together	Veneer	Voice
2024	I Don't Understand You	Cole	
2025	Another Simple Favor	Darren	
2026	Miss You, Love You	Jamie Simms	
TBA	Dedicated to Morris Burke †		Filming

=== Television ===
Year	Title	Role	Notes
1994–1997	Street Sharks	Streex, Shrimp Louie	Voice; 40 episodes
1999–2000	Archie's Weird Mysteries	Archie Andrews	Voice; 40 episodes
2001-2003	Cubix	Connor	Voice; 26 episodes
2002	Liberty's Kids	Alexander Hamilton	Voice
2003	The Archies: JugMan	Archie Andrews	Voice; Television film
2003–2004	Funky Cops	Dick/Jack Kowalski	Voice; 4Kids dub
2003–2009	Teenage Mutant Ninja Turtles	Additional voices	Voice
2006–2007	Chaotic	Various	Voice; 78 episodes
2012–2013	The New Normal	Bryan Collins	22 episodes
2012–2017	Girls	Elijah Krantz	35 episodes
2013	Comedy Bang! Bang!	Quinn Abernathy	Episode: "Clark Gregg Wears a Navy Blazer & White Collared Shirt"
2013–2014	How I Met Your Mother	Darren	2 episodes
2015	Glee	Himself	Episode: "Dreams Come True"
2015	The Knick	Frazier H. Wingo	4 episodes
2016	The Simpsons	Himself	Voice; Episode: "How Lisa Got Her Marge Back"
2016	Another Period	Bertram Harrison Fusselforth VII	3 episodes
2016	Drunk History	Washington Roebling	Episode: "Landmarks"
2016–2018	Sofia the First	Morris, Skye	Voice; 5 episodes
2017	Will & Grace	Reggie	Episode: "Grandpa Jack"
2017–2018	Welcome to the Wayne	Andrei	Voice; 9 episodes
2017–2021	Vampirina	King Peppy	Voice; 3 episodes
2017–2025	Big Mouth	Matthew MacDell	Voice; 58 episodes
2018	RuPaul's Drag Race	Himself / Guest Judge	Episode 8 (season 10)
2018	Bob's Burgers	Hayden	Voice; Episode: "Just One of the Boyz 4 Now for Now"
2018	The Romanoffs	David Patton	Episode: "Bright and High Circle"
2018	Live from Lincoln Center: Stars in Concert	Himself	Episode: "Andrew Rannells in Concert" (Season 1)
2019–2021	Black Monday	Blair Pfaff	30 episodes, also producer
2020	Central Park	Griffin	Voice; 2 episodes
2021–2022	Ridley Jones	Aten	Voice; 4 episodes
2021–2024	Girls5eva	Kev	Recurring role; 8 episodes
2021–2025	Invincible	William Clockwell	Voice; 16 episodes
2022	Duncanville		Voice; 2 episodes
2022	Welcome to Chippendales	Bradford Barton	4 episodes
2023	History of the World, Part II	Sergei	Episode: "V"
2023	The Great North	Rocky Ritz	Voice; Episode: "Great Bus of Choir Adventure"
2023	HouseBroken	Ennis	Voice; Episode: "Who's a Winner?"
2023	Adventure Time: Fionna and Cake	Gary Prince / Monster Gary	Voice; recurring
2023–2024	Princess Power	King Barton	Voice; 13 episodes
2024	Queer Planet	Himself	Voice; television film
2024	The Boys	Homelander Ice skater	1 episode
2025	Night Court	Tad	Episode: "Age Against the Machine"
2025	Too Much	Jameson South	5 episodes
2025	Elsbeth	Harris	Episode: "A Hard Nut to Crack"
2025–present	The Great American Baking Show	Himself	9 episodes
2026	Nobody Wants This	Sebastian	5 episodes

=== Anime ===
† indicates the release date of an English language version. This list is incomplete.

Year	Title	Voice role	Notes
2001–2006†	Pokémon	Morty, Harley, Additional voices	English dub
2001	Shaman King	Len Tao, Luchist Lasso	English dub
2001†	Tama and Friends	Tama	Main cast; 28 episodes; English dub
2001–2005	Yu-Gi-Oh! Duel Monsters	Mako Tsunami, Noah Kaiba, Leon von Schroeder / Leon Wilson	English dub
2002–2006	Kirby: Right Back at Ya!	Nightmare, Chief Bookem, Gengu, Herder Cappy, Rick, Narrator	English dub
2002	Knight Hunters Eternity	Toudou Hijiri	English dub
2003–2006	Sonic X	E-102 Gamma, Additional voices	English dub
2004–2005†	Pokémon Chronicles	Shinji, Forrest, Tomm	English dub
2005†	Tokyo Mew Mew	Dren, Wesley J., Coolridge III	English dub
2005	Yu-Gi-Oh! GX	Wheeler the Chimpanzee, Belowski, Additional voices	English dub
2009†	Dinosaur King	D'Artagnan	English dub

=== Video games ===
Year	Title	Voice role	Notes
2002	Cubix Robots for Everyone: Showdown	Conner	English dub
2004	Yu-Gi-Oh! Capsule Monster Coliseum	Mako Tsunami	English dub
2005	Shadow the Hedgehog	Additional characters	English dub
2005	One Piece: Pirates Carnival	Bellamy	English dub; uncredited
2006	Bully	Bif Taylor	

=== Theatre ===
Year	Title	Role	Venue	Notes
1992	On Golden Pond	Bill Ray Jr.	The Firehouse Dinner Theater	Omaha, NE
2000–2001	Pokémon Live!	James	US National Tour	
2002	Hedwig and the Angry Inch	Hedwig	Zach Theater	Austin, TX
2004	It's Karate, Kid!	Johnny Lawrence	Teatro La Tea, Off-off-Broadway	
2005	Hairspray	Fender (u/s Link Larkin)	Neil Simon Theatre, Broadway	
2005–2006	Hairspray	Link Larkin	Neil Simon Theatre, Broadway	Replacement
2006	The 60's Project	Performer	Chester, CT (Regional): World Premiere	
2006	One Step Forward		New World Stages	
2007	Miss Saigon	Chris Scott	Merry-Go-Round Playhouse	
2007	Thoroughly Modern Millie	Jimmy Smith	Cape Playhouse	
2007–2008	Jersey Boys	Bob Gaudio	US National Tour	
2009	Jersey Boys	Bob Gaudio	August Wilson Theatre, Broadway	Replacement
2010	Smokey Joe's Cafe		Paper Mill Playhouse	
2010	Lysistrata Jones	Michelangelo "Mick" Jackson	Dallas Theater Center	
2011–2012	The Book of Mormon	Elder Kevin Price	Eugene O'Neill Theatre, Broadway	
2014	Hedwig and the Angry Inch	Hedwig	Belasco Theatre, Broadway	Replacement
2015	Hamilton	King George III	Richard Rodgers Theatre, Broadway	Replacement
2016–2017	Falsettos	Whizzer Brown	Walter Kerr Theatre, Broadway	
2018	The Boys in the Band	Larry	Booth Theatre, Broadway	
2022	Tammy Faye	Jim Bakker	Almeida Theatre, off West End	
2023–2024	Gutenberg! The Musical!	Doug Simon	James Earl Jones Theatre, Broadway	
2025	All In: Comedy About Love	Performer	Hudson Theatre, Broadway	
2026	The Book of Mormon	Elder Kevin Price	Eugene O’Neill Theatre, Broadway	15th Anniversary Special Performances
2026–2027	Falsettos	Whizzer Brown	Carnegie Hall	10th Anniversary Reunion Concert
2026–2027	It's A Wonderful Life A Live Radio Play	Jake Laurents/George Bailey	Broadhurst Theatre	Broadway Original Cast
2027	Falsettos	Whizzer Brown	London Palladium, West End	10th Anniversary Reunion Concert

== Awards and nominations ==
Year	Award	Category	Work	Result	Ref.
2011	Tony Award	Best Performance by a Leading Actor in a Musical	The Book of Mormon	Nominated	
2011	Drama Desk Award	Outstanding Actor in a Musical	The Book of Mormon	Nominated	
2012	Grammy Award	Best Musical Theater Album	The Book of Mormon	Won	
2013	OFTA Award	Best Guest Actor in a Comedy Series	Girls	Nominated	
2013	Gold Derby Awards	Best Comedy Guest Actor	Girls	Nominated	
2013	Dorian Awards	Rising Star		Nominated	
2014	Gold Derby Award	Best Comedy Guest Actor	Girls	Nominated	
2014	Critics' Choice Television Award	Best Guest Performer in a Comedy Series	Girls	Nominated	
2015	Broadway.com Audience Awards	Favorite Replacement (Male)	Hedwig and the Angry Inch	Nominated	
2016	Broadway.com Audience Awards	Favorite Replacement (Male)	Hamilton	Nominated	
2017	Broadway.com Audience Awards	Favorite Featured Actor in a Musical	Falsettos	Won	
2017	Tony Award	Best Performance by a Featured Actor in a Musical	Falsettos	Nominated	
2017	Outer Critics Circle Award	Outstanding Featured Actor in a Musical	Falsettos	Nominated	
2021	Critics' Choice Television Award	Best Supporting Actor in a Comedy Series	Black Monday	Nominated	
2023	Laurence Olivier Award	Best Actor in a Musical	Tammy Faye	Nominated	
2024	Drama League Award	Distinguished Performance Award	Gutenberg! The Musical!	Nominated	
2024	Broadway.com Audience Award	Favorite Funny Performance	Gutenberg! The Musical!	Nominated	
2024	Broadway.com Audience Award	Favorite Onstage Pair (with Josh Gad)	Gutenberg! The Musical!	Nominated	

== See also ==
- LGBT culture in New York City
