= Just One Time (film) =

Just One Time is a 1999 feature length comedy film, written and directed by Lane Janger. It is also a 1998 short film by the same director on which the long feature was based on.

== 1998: Just One Time (short) ==
Just One Time (short)
- Directed by: Lane Janger
- Screenplay by: Lane Janger
- Story by: Lane Janger
- Produced by: Lane Janger and Exile Ramirez (producers), Blake Baldwin (associate producer)
- Starring: Lane Janger; Joelle Carter; Guillermo Díaz; Jennifer Esposito
- Cinematography: Timothy Naylor
- Edited by: François Keraudren
- Music by: David Michael Frank
- Release date: 1998
- Running time: 8 minutes
- Country: United States
- Language: English

The film Just One Time is based on an 8-minute short film of the same name produced in 1998 in which a man wants his girlfriend to have a sexual relationship with another girl, just one time. It was written and directed by Lane Janger and includes Guillermo Díaz (as Victor), Jennifer Esposito (as Michelle), Joelle Carter (as Amy) and Lane Langer (as Anthony)

=== Award ===
The short won aGLIFF Award in "Best Boy's Short" category at the Austin Gay & Lesbian International Film Festival.

== 1999: Just One Time (feature film) ==
Just One Time
- Original film poster
- Directed by: Lane Janger
- Screenplay by: Lane Janger; Jennifer Vandever
- Story by: Lane Janger
- Produced by: Jasmine Kosovic, Lane Janger and Exile Ramirez (producers), Jeff Roth (co-producer), David R. Ginsburg, Marcus Hu and Charlotte Mickie (executive producers)
- Starring: Lane Janger; Joelle Carter; Guillermo Díaz; Jennifer Esposito
- Cinematography: Timothy Naylor and Michael St. Hilaire
- Edited by: François Keraudren and Mitchel Stanley
- Music by: Edward Bilous and David Michael Frank
- Release date: 1999
- Country: United States
- Language: English

The film Just One Time was screened at the 1998 Toronto International Film Festival. Janger is the star, writer, and director; and he plays the lead role as Anthony. It also stars Joelle Carter as Amy, Guillermo Díaz as Victor, and Jennifer Esposito as Michelle.

=== Synopsis ===
The fiancée of a fireman reluctantly agrees to participate in a "ménage à trois" with another woman, a sexual fantasy of his. She agrees to the arrangement, but insists to turn the table on him. She suggests that he agree to reciprocate by having a one time relationship with another man. This ultimately puts the impending marriage of the two in jeopardy.

=== Reception ===
The film received mixed reviews, praising the secondary characters while unimpressed with the acting of the two leads.

=== Cast ===
- Lane Janger as Anthony
- Joelle Carter as Amy
- Guillermo Díaz as Victor
- Jennifer Esposito as Michelle
- Vincent Laresca as Nick
- Domenick Lombardozzi as Cyrill
- David Lee Russek as Dom
- Mickey Cottrell as Father Sebastian
- Jerran Friedman as Young Man in Bathroom (credited as Jerran Marshall)
- Anthony Gestone as Club dancer
- Hazelle Goodman as Discussion leader in Ladies' bookstore
- Harley Kaplan as Fireboy's Friend
- Susan Kellermann as Nava Hannibal (Amy's Mom)
- Priscilla Lopez as Victor's Mother
- Ajay Mehta as Husan NY Deli owner
- Pat Moya as Mona
- Chris Stewart as Bartender
- André Vippolis as Fireboy

=== Award nomination ===
- 1999: Nomination for "Best Producer" for film producer Jasmine Kosovic during the Independent Spirit Awards. It was jointly for the film Just One Time and another film she had produced, namely The Adventures of Sebastian Cole
