= Michael Benjamin Washington =

American actor

- Born: Dallas, Texas, U.S.
- Occupation: Actor
- Years active: 2004–present

Michael Benjamin Washington is an American actor with screen roles spanning American Auto, 100 Questions, and Unbreakable Kimmy Schmidt. His career began on Broadway, first appearing in Mamma Mia! as part of the musical's original cast.

== Early and personal life ==
Washington was born in Dallas, Texas. He is a YoungArts alumnus. In 1997, he was named a Presidential Scholar of the Arts as part of the 1997 U.S Presidential Scholars Program. Afterwards, he received a Bachelor of Fine Arts from New York University Tisch School of the Arts, with a Journalism minor.

== Career ==
=== Stage ===
Washington has several Broadway credits, beginning with the jukebox musical Mamma Mia! in 2001. He was cast in the 2002 Funny Girl benefit concert, followed by the 2004 revival of La Cage aux Folles. Washington later took dramatic roles in plays, with the 2018 revival of The Boys in the Band and the 2026 revival of Death of a Salesman.

=== Film ===
Year	Title	Role	Notes
2010	Love & Other Drugs	Richard	
2020	The Boys in the Band	Bernard	

=== Television ===
Year	Title	Role	Notes
2004	The Jury	Myles	Episode: "Bangers"
2005	Hope & Faith	Angst-Ridden Performer	Episode: "Hope in the Middle"
2009	Law & Order	George Lafferty	Episode: "Bailout"
2009–10	30 Rock	Donald	2 episodes
2010	10 Things I Hate About You	Winston the Waiter	Episode: "Great Expectations"
2010	Glee	Tracy Pendergrass	Episode: "Home"
2010	100 Questions	Andrew	6 episodes
2010	Open Books	Ray	Television film
2013	Wendell & Vinnie	Deke	Episode: "Baseball and Bad Dates"
2014	Save the Date	Wedding Planner	Television film
2017	Unbreakable Kimmy Schmidt	Ruben	3 episodes
2020	Ratched	Trevor Briggs	3 episodes
2021–23	American Auto	Cyrus Knight	23 episodes
2023	Until the Wedding	Sam	Pilot
2023	We Baby Bears	Caterpillar (voice)	Episode: "Bug City Frame Up"
2025	Godfather of Harlem	James Baldwin	season 4
2026	Not Suitable for Work	Antoine	Recurring
