= Robin de Jesús =

American actor

- De Jesús in 2026
- Born: Norwalk, Connecticut, U.S.
- Occupation: Actor
- Years active: 2003–present

Robin de Jesús is an American film and theater actor of Puerto Rican descent. He has received Tony Award nominations for his roles in In the Heights, La Cage aux Folles, and The Boys in the Band. He is also known for portraying Michael in tick, tick... BOOM!.

== Life and career ==
Robin de Jesús was born in Norwalk, Connecticut.

His first major role was as Michael in the independent film Camp (2003), where he plays a gay teen who gets beat up for wearing drag to his prom. While the film (which also starred Anna Kendrick) went relatively unnoticed in the mainstream, it gained a cult following among musical theater fans and teens who connected to the outcast theme.

He is perhaps best known for playing the role of Sonny in the 2008 Broadway musical In the Heights, for which he received a Tony Award nomination for Best Featured Actor in a Musical. In 2010, he joined the revival cast of La Cage aux Folles as Jacob, the sassy housekeeper, which earned him his second Tony Award nomination in the Featured Actor category. The production opened at the Longacre Theatre on April 18, 2010. De Jesús left the production on February 13, 2011, replaced by Wilson Jermaine Heredia. De Jesús played the role of Boq in the Broadway production of Wicked at the Gershwin Theatre. In 2019, he received a third Tony Award nomination, for Best Featured Actor in a Play, for his role of Emory in The Boys in the Band. He recreated the role for the 2020 film adaptation produced for Netflix.

In 2021, de Jesús played Michael in the musical drama tick, tick... BOOM!, the directorial debut of Lin-Manuel Miranda, for which he received critical acclaim and a nomination for the Satellite Award for Best Supporting Actor – Motion Picture.

== Personal life ==
De Jesús is gay.

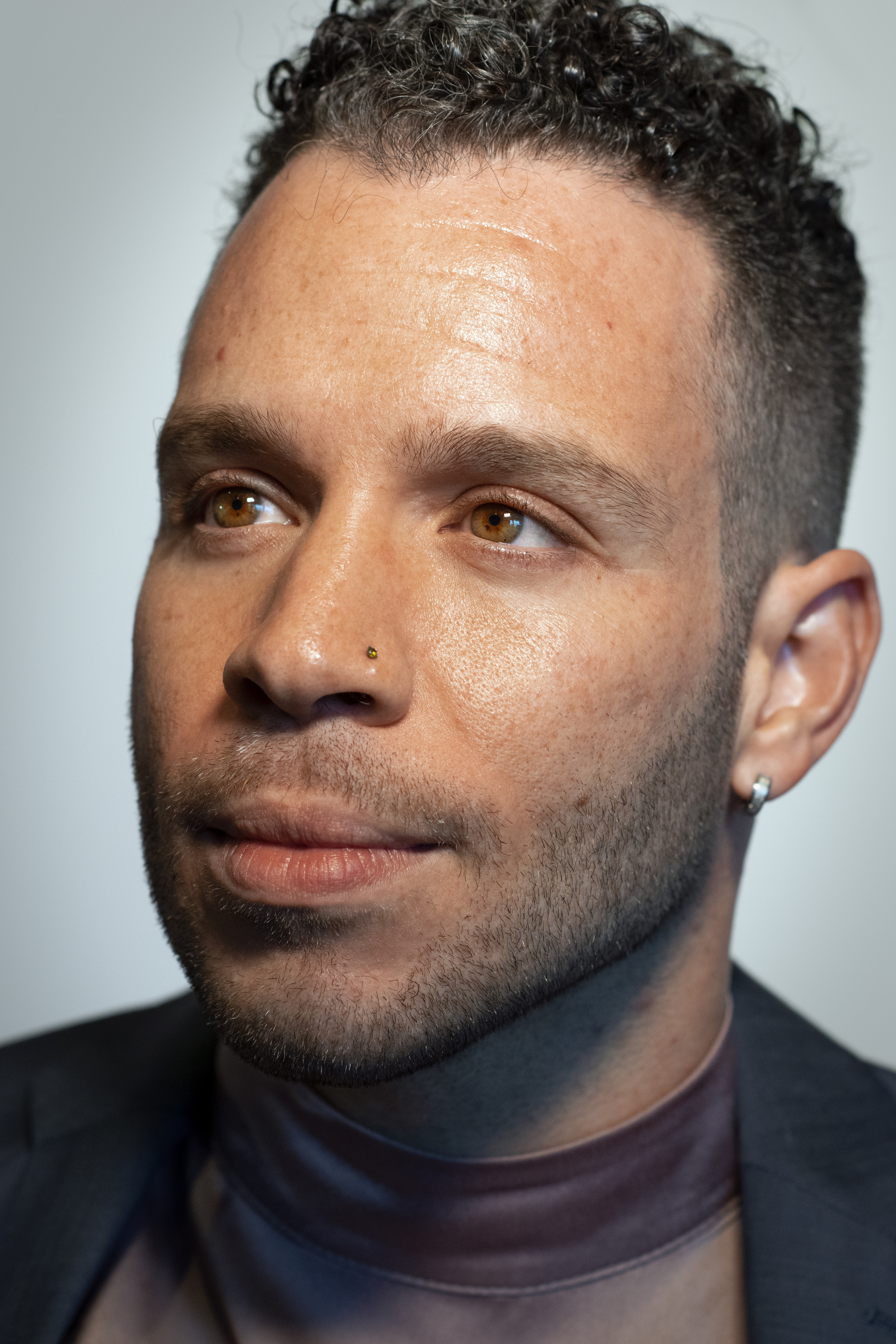
de Jesús in 2022

== Credits ==
=== Film ===
Year	Title	Role	Notes
2003	Camp	Michael Flores	
2006	Fat Girls	Rudy	
2011	Gun Hill Road	Robin	
2012	Elliot Loves	Hector	
2013	Hair Brained	Romeo Torres	
2013	Bert and Arnie's Guide to Friendship	Student	
2016	11:55	Rubio	
2020	Milkwater	George	
2020	The Boys in the Band	Emory	
2021	tick, tick... BOOM!	Michael	

=== Television ===
Year	Title	Role	Notes
2010	How to Make It in America	Street teenager	Episode: "Crisp"
2012–2016	Law & Order: Special Victims Unit	Jose Silva	5 episodes
2022	Santiago of the Seas	Pepito	Episode: "A Tale of Two-mas"
2022	Would I Lie to You?	Himself	Episode: "Boy in a Barrel"
2022–2023	Welcome to Chippendales	Ray Colon	6 episodes
2023	Big Mouth	"Esperando Pelitos" performer (voice)	Episode: "The International Show"
2025	Black Rabbit	Tony	Miniseries

=== Theater ===
Year	Title	Role	Details	Notes
2005	Rent	Steve/Waiter; Angel (u/s)	Broadway	
2005	In the Heights	Sonny	Eugene O'Neill Theater Center	
2007	In the Heights	Sonny	Off-Broadway	
2008–2010	In the Heights	Sonny	Broadway; February 14, 2008 – February 14, 2010	
2010–2011	La Cage aux Folles	Jacob	Broadway revival; April 6, 2010 – February 14, 2011	
2012	Aladdin	Aladdin	The Muny	
2013	Domesticated	Bar Patron	Lincoln Center Theater	
2013	In the Heights	Sonny	United Palace of Cultural Arts	
2014	Grease	Doody	Paper Mill Playhouse	
2014	Mother Jones and the Children's Crusade	Jack Dorsey	New York Musical Theatre Festival	
2014–2016	Wicked	Boq	Broadway; December 16, 2014 – January 31, 2016	
2016	Cabaret	The Emcee	Wells Fargo Pavilion	
2017	In the Heights	Usnavi	Olney Theatre Center	
2017–2018	Wicked	Boq	"Munchkinland" national tour; May 2, 2017 – March 12, 2018	
2018	The Boys in the Band	Emory	Broadway revival	
2023	Little Shop of Horrors	Seymour Krelborn	The Muny	
2026	Night Side Songs	Ensemble	Claire Tow Theater	

== Awards and nominations ==
Year	Award	Category	Work	Result
2007	Drama Desk Award	Outstanding Ensemble Performance	In the Heights	Won
2008	Tony Award	Best Featured Actor in a Musical	In the Heights	Nominated
2010	Tony Award	Best Featured Actor in a Musical	La Cage aux Folles	Nominated
2010	Drama Desk Award	Outstanding Featured Actor in a Musical	La Cage aux Folles	Nominated
2019	Tony Award	Best Featured Actor in a Play	The Boys in the Band	Nominated
2021	Satellite Award	Best Supporting Actor – Motion Picture	tick, tick... BOOM!	Nominated
2021	Hollywood Critics Association Film Award	Best Supporting Actor	tick, tick... BOOM!	Nominated
2026	Lucille Lortel Award	Outstanding Ensemble	Night Side Songs	Won

== See also ==
- LGBT culture in New York City
- List of LGBT people from New York City
- NYC Pride March
