= List of LGBTQ-related films of 1970 =

This is a list of lesbian, gay, bisexual, transgender or queer-related films released in 1970. It contains theatrically released films that deal with important gay, lesbian, bisexual, transgender or queer characters or issues and may have same-sex romance or relationships as a plot device.

== Films ==
| Title | Director | Country | Genre | Cast | Notes |
|---|---|---|---|---|---|
| Beyond the Valley of the Dolls | Russ Meyer | United States | Comedy | Dolly Read, Cynthia Myers | |
| The Boys in the Band | William Friedkin | United States | Drama | Kenneth Nelson, Leonard Frey, Cliff Gorman, Laurence Luckinbill, Frederick Combs, Keith Prentice, Robert La Tourneaux, Reuben Greene and Peter White | Screenplay by Mart Crowley, based on his play of the same name; one of the first major American motion pictures to revolve around gay characters |
| The Christine Jorgensen Story | Irving Rapper | United States | Drama | Joan Tompkins, John Hansen | |
| The Conformist | Bernardo Bertolucci | Italy; West Germany; France | Drama | Jean-Louis Trintignant, Pasquale Fortunato, Stefania Sandrelli, Gastone Moschin, Dominique Sanda, Enzo Tarascio, Fosco Giachetti, José Quaglio, Pierre Clémenti, Yvonne Sanson, Milly, Giuseppe Addobbati, Antonio Maestri and Christian Aligny | Based on the novel of the same name by Alberto Moravia |
| Daddy, Darling | Joseph W. Sarno | Denmark; United States | Sexploitation | Helli Louise, Gio Petré, Ole Wisborg | |
| The Dark Side of Tomorrow | Jack Deerson, Barbara Peeters | United States | Drama, romance | Elizabeth Plumb, Alicia Courtney, John Aprea, Marland Proctor and Wayne Want | Re-released in 1975 as Just the Two of Us |
| Dorian Gray | Massimo Dallamano | Italy; West Germany; United Kingdom | Horror, thriller | Helmut Berger, Richard Todd, Herbert Lom, Marie Liljedahl, Margaret Lee, Isa Miranda, Eleonora Rossi Drago, Maria Rohm, Stewart Black and Beryl Cunningham | Based on the novel of the same name by Oscar Wilde |
| Entertaining Mr Sloane | Douglas Hickox | United Kingdom | Comedy | Beryl Reid, Peter McEnery, Harry Andrews and Alan Webb | Based on the play of the same name by Joe Orton |
| Gods of the Plague | Rainer Werner Fassbinder | West Germany | Drama | Hanna Schygulla, Margarethe von Trotta, Harry Baer, Günther Kaufmann, Carla Egerer, Ingrid Caven, Jan George, Marian Seidowsky and Yaak Karsunke | |
| Golden Eagle | Mitr Chaibancha | Thailand | Action | Mitr Chaibancha, Petchara Chaowarat, Ling Fan, Chuen Chan, Chat Chayaphum, Chuan Chen, Hao Chen, Ti-Ko Chen and Yi-Hsiung Chi | Sub-plot features a gang of kathoey as criminals, with a cross-dressing police detective trying to infiltrate them; Chaibancha fell to his death while filming the stunt for the final scene |
| The Kremlin Letter | John Huston | United States | Crime, drama | | Based on the novel by Noel Behn |
| Monique | John Bown | United Kingdom | Drama | David Sumner, Joan Alcorn, Sibylla Kay, Nicola Bown, Jacob Fitz-Jones, Davilia O'Connor, Carol Hawkins and Howard Rawlinson | |
| Multiple Maniacs | John Waters | United States | Comedy, horror | Divine, David Lochary, Mary Vivian Pearce, Mink Stole, Cookie Mueller, Edith Massey | |
| Myra Breckinridge | Michael Sarne | United States | Comedy | Raquel Welch, Rex Reed, John Huston, Mae West, Farrah Fawcett, Roger C. Carmel, Roger Herren, George Furth, Calvin Lockhart, Jim Backus, John Carradine, Andy Devine, Grady Sutton, Robert Lieb, Skip Ward, Kathleen Freeman, B.S. Pully, Buck Kartalian, Monte Landis, Tom Selleck, Toni Basil, Dan Hedaya and William Hopper | Based on the novel of the same name by Gore Vidal |
| No desearás al vecino del quinto | Ramón Fernández | Spain; Italy | Comedy | Alfredo Landa, Jean Sorel, Princess Ira von Fürstenberg, Isabel Garcés, Margot Cottens, Adrián Ortega, Annabella Incontrera, Guadalupe Muñoz Sampedro, Franco Balducci and Malisa Longo | |
| The Private Life of Sherlock Holmes | Billy Wilder | United Kingdom, United States | Adventure, comedy, crime | Robert Stephens, Colin Blakely, Geneviève Page, Christopher Lee, Irene Handl, Clive Revill, Tamara Toumanova, Stanley Holloway, Mollie Maureen, Catherine Lacey, James Copeland, Jenny Hanley and Alex McCrindle | |
| Something for Everyone | Harold Prince | United States | Comedy, crime | Angela Lansbury, Michael York, Anthony Higgins, Jane Carr, Heidelinde Weis, Wolfried Lier, Despo Diamantidou, John Gill, Eva Maria Meineke, Klaus Havenstein and Walter Janssen | |
| Tell Me That You Love Me, Junie Moon | Otto Preminger | United States | Comedy, Drama, romance | Liza Minnelli, Ken Howard, Robert Moore, James Coco, Kay Thompson, Fred Williamson, Ben Piazza, Emily Yancy, Leonard Frey, Clarice Taylor, James Beard, Julie Bovasso, Gina Collens, Barbara Logan and Nancy Marchand | Based on the novel of the same name by Marjorie Kellogg |
| Trash | Paul Morrissey | United States | Drama | Joe Dallesandro, Holly Woodlawn, Jane Forth, Michael Sklar, Geri Miller, Andrea Feldman, Johnny Putnam, Bruce Pecheur and Diane Podlewski | |
| Valerie and Her Week of Wonders | Jaromil Jireš | Czechoslovakia | Drama | Jaroslava Schallerová, Helena Anýzová, Petr Kopriva, Jirí Prýmek, Jan Klusák, Libuse Komancová, Karel Engel, Alena Stojáková and Otto Hradecký | Based on the novel of the same name by Vítězslav Nezval |
| The Vampire Lovers | Roy Ward Baker | United Kingdom; United States | Horror | Ingrid Pitt, Peter Cushing, George Cole, Dawn Addams, Pippa Steel, Madeline Smith, Kate O'Mara, Douglas Wilmer, Jon Finch, Ferdy Mayne, Kirsten Lindholm, John Forbes-Robertson, Shelagh Wilcocks, Janet Key, Harvey Hall and Charles Farrell | Based on the novella Carmilla by Sheridan Le Fanu |
| Estranho Triângulo | Pedro Camargo | Brazil | Drama | Carlo Mossy, Leila Santos, José Augusto Branco, José Wilker, Lúcia Alves and Dinorah Brillanti | |
