= List of feature films with gay characters: 1900–1999 =

Symbol for male homosexuality

The following is a list of feature films with fictional and factual gay characters. The films were released theatrically, direct-to-video, or on a streaming platform (OTT network).

Films are in alphabetical order by year of release. Titles beginning with determiners "A", "An", and "The" are alphabetized by the first significant word.

== 1900s–1950s ==
List
Year	Title	Character(s)	Actor	Notes	Country	Ref(s)
1916	The Wings	Claude Zoret	Egil Eide	Love triangle drama between a countess, a gay sculptor, and his bisexual model and lover.	Sweden	
1919	Different from the Others	Paul Körner	Conrad Veidt; Karl Giese (young)	The first film supportive of homosexuality.	Germany	
1924	Michael	Claude Zoret	Benjamin Christiensen	Claude is a painter who falls in love with his assistant, Michael. Michael eventually leaves Claude for a woman.	Germany	
1941	The Maltese Falcon	Joel Cairo	Peter Lorre	In the novel upon which the film is based, Cairo is referred to as "queer" and a "fairy" but, in the film, his sexuality is not directly addressed, likely a decision by filmmakers to comply with the Hays Code, which banned the depiction of homosexuality in American films.	United States	
1948	Rope	Phillip Morgan	Farley Granger	Because of the Hays Code, the word "homosexual" could not be stated outright and was referred to as "it". Adapted from the 1929 British play Rope's End, which is loosely based on the Leopold and Loeb murder case.	United States	
1948	Rope	Brandon Shaw	John Dall	Because of the Hays Code, the word "homosexual" could not be stated outright and was referred to as "it". Adapted from the 1929 British play Rope's End, which is loosely based on the Leopold and Loeb murder case.	United States	
1950	All About Eve	Addison DeWitt	George Sanders	Addison is a gossip columnist who engages in loveless relationship predation. (The constraints of the Motion Picture Production Code did not allow homosexuality to be portrayed overtly.)	United States	
1955	Rebel Without a Cause	John "Plato" Crawford	Sal Mineo	Plato was brought in for killing a litter of puppies.	United States	
1959	North by Northwest	Leonard	Martin Landau	Leonard is Vandamm's right-hand man.	United States	
1959	Suddenly, Last Summer	Sebastian Venable	(Uncredited)	The film centers on Catherine Holly, a young woman who was evaluated by a psychiatric doctor to receive a lobotomy after the events surrounding her cousin Sebastian's death	United Kingdom, United States	

== 1960s ==
List
Year	Title	Character(s)	Actor	Notes	Country	Ref(s)
1960	Oscar Wilde	Oscar Wilde	Robert Morley	The film is a biography of poet and playwright Oscar Wilde.	United Kingdom	
1960	Spartacus	Crassus	Laurence Olivier	In a deleted scene, Crassus attempts to seduce his slave Antoninus.	United States	
1961	A Taste of Honey	Geoffrey Ingham	Murray Melvin	Ingham is Jo's friend.	United Kingdom	
1961	Victim	Melville Farr	Dirk Bogarde	Melville is a barrister threatened with blackmail. The film is credited for being important in the decriminalization of homosexuality in Britain. It is also the first British film to use the word "homosexual" in the narrative.	United Kingdom	
1962	Advise & Consent	Senator Brigham "Brig" Anderson	Don Murray	Anderson is a Senator in Utah.	United States	
1962	The L-Shaped Room	Johnny	Brock Peters	Johnny is a resident in a run down boarding house in Notting Hill, London.	United Kingdom	
1962	The Trial	Josef K.	Anthony Perkins	A closeted homosexual.	France, Italy, West Germany	
1963	Scorpio Rising	Scorpio	Bruce Byron	The film follows a group of bikers preparing for a night out.	United States	
1964	The Leather Boys	Pete	Dudley Sutton	Pete is Reggie's fellow biker friend.	United Kingdom	
1965	Bus Riley's Back in Town	Spencer	Crahan Denton	Spencer is the boss of a customer of Bus's.	United States	
1965	Darling	Robert Gold	Dirk Bogarde	Gold is a literary interviewer/director for television arts programmes	United Kingdom	
1965	Inside Daisy Clover	Wade Lewis	Robert Redford	An extremely intoxicated Melora Swan reveals to Daisy that she had an affair with closet homosexual Wade.	United States	
1965	King Rat	Stevens	Michael Lees	Stevens is a hospital staff.	United States	
1965	The Loved One	Mr. Starker	Liberace	Mr. Joyboy is Whispering Glade's chief embalmer.	United States	
1965	The Loved One	Mr. Joyboy	Rod Steiger	Mr. Joyboy is Whispering Glade's chief embalmer.	United States	
1965	The Pawnbroker	Rodriguez	Brock Peters	Rodriguez is a racketeer who uses Nazerman's pawnshop as a front.	United States	
1967	Bedazzled	Envy	Barry Humphries	Envy and Vanity are Stanley's staff of seven deadly sins, who are helping him with minor acts of vandalism and spite to be readmitted to Heaven.	United Kingdom	
1967	Bedazzled	Vanity	Alba	Envy and Vanity are Stanley's staff of seven deadly sins, who are helping him with minor acts of vandalism and spite to be readmitted to Heaven.	United Kingdom	
1967	The Fearless Vampire Killers	Herbert von Krolock	Iain Quarrier	Krolock is a local vampire lord in Transylvania.	United States	
1967	The Incident	Kenneth Otis	Robert Fields	Otis is a homosexual who earlier made an unsuccessful attempt at befriending McCann.	United States	
1967	Portrait of Jason	Himself	Jason Holliday	Documentary about American hustler and nightclub performer Jason Holliday.	United States	
1967	Reflections in a Golden Eye	Major Weldon Pendertis	Marlon Brando	Penderton is a closeted homosexual army Major and husband to Leonora.	United States	
1967	Tony Rome	Rood	Lloyd Bochner	Rood is a drug dealer.	United States	
1968	The Anniversary	Henry Taggart	James Cossins	Henry is a transvestite.	United Kingdom	
1968	Boom!	The Witch of Capri	Noël Coward	The Witch of Capri is Mrs. Goforth's wickedly gossipy friend.	United Kingdom	
1968	The Boston Strangler	Terence Huntley	Hurd Hatfield	Huntley is a rich murder suspect who is interrogated by Detective Bottomly in a gay bar.	United States	
1968	Deadfall	Richard	Eric Portman	Fé and Clarke begin a romantic affair, which Fé's husband Richard, who has a young male lover, does not discourage.	United Kingdom	
1968	The Detective	Teddy Leikman	James Inman	Teddy, the son of a powerful businessman, is found murdered.	United States	
1968	The Detective	Colin MacIver	William Windom	Teddy, the son of a powerful businessman, is found murdered.	United States	
1968	The Fixer	Boris Bibikov	Dirk Bogarde	Boris is a prosecutor.	United Kingdom	
1968	Flesh	The Artist	Maurice Braddell	The Artist wishes to draw Joe, a hustler working on the streets of New York City.	United States	
1968	Flesh	David	Louis Waldon	The Artist wishes to draw Joe, a hustler working on the streets of New York City.	United States	
1968	Flesh	Joe's Customer	John Christian	The Artist wishes to draw Joe, a hustler working on the streets of New York City.	United States	
1968	if....	"Wally" Wallace	Richard Warwick	Wallace is Mick Trav's fellow non-conformist friend in the lower sixth form, their penultimate year at a traditional British public school for boys in the late 1960s.	United Kingdom	
1968	if....	Bobby Philips	Rupert Webster	Wallace is Mick Trav's fellow non-conformist friend in the lower sixth form, their penultimate year at a traditional British public school for boys in the late 1960s.	United Kingdom	
1968	Inadmissible Evidence	John Montague Maples	John Normington	Maples is a distraught client of Barrister, Bill Maitland.	United Kingdom	
1968	Joanna	Lord Peter Sanderson	Donald Sutherland	Sanderson has a terminal illness and sponsors an exhibit of Hendrik's paintings.	United Kingdom	
1968	Lady in Cement	Danny Yale	Frank Raiter	Danny is the owner of Jilly's Nightclub and Maria's boss.	United States	
1968	The Lion in Winter	Philip II of France	Timothy Dalton	Philip reveals he had been caballing with Richard separately, and that he and Richard may once have been lovers.	United States, United Kingdom	
1968	The Lion in Winter	Richard the Lionheart	Anthony Hopkins	Philip reveals he had been caballing with Richard separately, and that he and Richard may once have been lovers.	United States, United Kingdom	
1968	The Mercenary	Ricciolo (Curly)	Jack Palance	Curly is Kowalski's flamboyant American rival.	Italy, Spain, United States	
1968	No Way to Treat a Lady	Christopher Gill	Rod Steiger	Gill is a serial killer fixated on his late mother, a noted stage actress.	United States	
1968	P.J.	Shelton Quell	Severn Darden	Quell is the family butler.	United States	
1968	The Queen	Himself	Flawless Sabrina	Sabrina is the mistress of ceremonies for the 1967 Miss All-America Camp Beauty Contest.	United States	
1968	The Sergeant	Albert Callan	Rod Steiger	Callan is a dedicated and decorated war veteran, posted in France at a fuel supply depot in 1952.	United States	
1968	Star!	Noël Coward	Daniel Massey	Biopic about Gertrude Lawrence who, besides collaborating with him in theater productions, also had a close friendship with Coward off stage.	United States	
1969	Angel, Angel, Down We Go	Willy Steele	Charles Aidman	Willy is a wealthy airplane manufacturer and the closeted father of Tara.	United States	
1969	The Damned	Konstantin von Essenbeck	Reinhard Kolldehoff	Part of a wealthy industrialist family, Konstantin is an SA officer who is part of homosexual orgy in Wiesee.	Italy, West Germany	
1969	Fellini Satyricon	Ascyltus	Hiram Keller	Encolpius and his friend Ascyltus to win the heart of a young boy named Gitón within a surreal and dreamlike Roman landscape.	Italy, France	
1969	The Gay Deceivers	Malcolm	Michael Greer	Malcolm is Danny and Elliot's landlord, who has a husband.	United States	
1969	The Gay Deceivers	Colonel Dixon	Jack Starrett	Malcolm is Danny and Elliot's landlord, who has a husband.	United States	
1969	Justine	"Toto"	Cliff Gorman	The film centers around Justine, who is working against the British government to send weapons to Jews in Palestine. Toto is among the film's casualties.	United States	
1969	Listen, Let's Make Love	Baron von Tummler	Amerigo Tot	Lallo's presence arouses the sexual interest of Baron von Tummler, an old homosexual, and Flavia, a steel heiress. Tummler competes with her at an auction for a pair of antique cufflinks that interest Lallo.	Italy, France	
1969	Midnight Cowboy	Young Student	Bob Balaban	The young student offers Joe money in exchange for giving Joe fellatio in a Times Square movie house and afterward confesses he has no money to pay him.	United States	
1969	Riot	Mary Sheldon	Clifford David	Sheldon is a tough prison queen Briston faced.	United States	
1969	Staircase	Harry C. Leeds	Richard Burton	An ageing couple who own a barber shop in the East End of London.	United Kingdom	
1969	Staircase	Charles Dyer	Rex Harrison	An ageing couple who own a barber shop in the East End of London.	United Kingdom	
1969	Two Gentlemen Sharing	Marcus	Ram John Holder	Marcus makes a pass at Roddy.	United States, United Kingdom	
1969	Women in Love	Loerke	Vladek Sheybal	Loerke is a German sculptor who is befriended by Gudrun, who is also an artist.	United Kingdom	
1969	Z	Vago	Marcel Bozzuffi	Vago is based on Emmanouel Emmannouilidis, the man who struck Lambrakis.	Algeria, France	

== 1970s ==
List
Year	Title	Character(s)	Actor	Notes	Country	Ref(s)
1970	Bloody Mama	Kevin Dirkman	Bruce Dern	Kevin is Fred's older cellmate who eventually became his lover.	United States	
1970	The Boys in the Band	Michael	Kenneth Nelson	This was the first Hollywood film in which all of the principal characters are homosexual.	United States	
1970	The Boys in the Band	Harold	Leonard Frey	This was the first Hollywood film in which all of the principal characters are homosexual.	United States	
1970	The Boys in the Band	Emory	Cliff Gorman	This was the first Hollywood film in which all of the principal characters are homosexual.	United States	
1970	The Boys in the Band	Hank	Laurence Luckinbill	This was the first Hollywood film in which all of the principal characters are homosexual.	United States	
1970	The Boys in the Band	Donald	Frederick Combs	This was the first Hollywood film in which all of the principal characters are homosexual.	United States	
1970	The Conformist	Marcello Clerici	Jean-Louis Trintignant	Clerici is a mid-level Fascist functionary (Trintignant) who is ordered to assassinate his former professor, an antifascist dissident in Paris.	Italy, France, West Germany	
1970	Cover Me Babe	Ronnie	Floyd Mutrux	Ronnie is the mutual friend of Tony and Sybil. He is ashamed of being gay. At Tony's insistence, Sybil attempts to seduce Danny while Tony films it.	United States	
1970	Entertaining Mr Sloane	Ed	Harry Andrews	Ed is Kath's closeted brother.	United Kingdom	
1970	The Kremlin Letter	The Warlock	George Sanders	"The Warlock" is a culturally sophisticated homosexual member of the group.	United States	
1970	Little Big Man	Little Horse	Robert Little Star	Little Horse is a native American that holds a sacred position in the tribe.	United States	
1970	Loot	Dennis	Hywel Bennett	Hal is the seaside hotel owner's son, and he robbed a bank with his boyfriend, Dennis.	United Kingdom	
1970	Loot	Hal	Roy Holder	Hal is the seaside hotel owner's son, and he robbed a bank with his boyfriend, Dennis.	United Kingdom	
1970	Myra Breckinridge	Irving "Blaggot" Amadeus	Calvin Lockhart	Blaggot is an effete man.	United States	
1970	The Private Life of Sherlock Holmes	Sherlock Holmes	Robert Stephens	Offering an affectionate, slightly parodic look at Sherlock Holmes, and draws a distinction between the "real" Holmes and the character portrayed by Watson in his stories for The Strand magazine.	United States, United Kingdom	
1970	The Sidelong Glances of a Pigeon Kicker	Oliver	Riggs O'Hara	Oliver is an interior decorator.	United States	
1970	Something for Everyone	Konrad Ludwig	Michael York	Konrad and Helmuth are star-crossed lovers.	United States	
1970	Something for Everyone	Helmuth von Ornstein	Anthony Higgins	Konrad and Helmuth are star-crossed lovers.	United States	
1970	Tell Me That You Love Me, Junie Moon	Warren	Robert Moore	Warren is the paraplegic friend of Junie Moon whom she meets in an institution.	United States	
1970	Tell Me That You Love Me, Junie Moon	Guiles	Leonard Frey	Warren is the paraplegic friend of Junie Moon whom she meets in an institution.	United States	
1971	The Anderson Tapes	Tommy Haskins	Martin Balsam	Haskins is a crooked antique dealer.	United States	
1971	The Cat o' Nine Tails	Dr. Braun	Horst Frank	Dr. Braun is a scientist and one of the innocent leads in a murder case.	Italy, France, West Germany	
1971	Death in Venice	Gustav von Aschenbach	Dirk Bogarde	Composer Gustav von Aschenbach travels to Venice for rest, due to serious health concerns.	France, Italy	
1971	Diamonds Are Forever	Mr. Wint	Bruce Glover	Wint and Kidd are hit men who work for Ernst Stavro Blofeld.	United Kingdom	
1971	Diamonds Are Forever	Mr. Kidd	Putter Smith	Wint and Kidd are hit men who work for Ernst Stavro Blofeld.	United Kingdom	
1971	Fortune and Men's Eyes	Queenie	Michael Greer	Queenie is a drag queen incarcerated for robbery. Mona is a teenager who was arrested for flirting with boys.	United States	
1971	Fortune and Men's Eyes	Mona	Danny Freedman	Queenie is a drag queen incarcerated for robbery. Mona is a teenager who was arrested for flirting with boys.	United States	
1971	It Is Not the Homosexual Who Is Perverse, But the Society in Which He Lives	Daniel	Bernd Feuerhelm	Daniel from the province comes to Berlin and meets Clemens. Both experience great love, move in together and try to copy the bourgeois marriage.	West Germany	
1971	It Is Not the Homosexual Who Is Perverse, But the Society in Which He Lives	Clemens	Berryt Bohlen	Daniel from the province comes to Berlin and meets Clemens. Both experience great love, move in together and try to copy the bourgeois marriage.	West Germany	
1971	The Last Picture Show	Coach Popper	Bill Thurman	Coach Popper is closeted and married to Ruth.	United States	
1971	The Music Lovers	Pyotr Ilyich Tchaikovsky	Richard Chamberlain	Tchaikovsky was a Russian composer during the Romantic period.	United Kingdom	
1971	Pink Narcissus	Pan	Bobby Kendall	Pan is a young and attractive male escort.	United States	
1971	Pink Narcissus	Bar Owner	Charles Ludlam	Pan is a young and attractive male escort.	United States	
1971	Shaft	Rollie	Rex Robbins	Rollie is the bartender at a bar that Shaft frequents.	United States	
1971	Some of My Best Friends Are...	Scott	Gil Gerard	On Christmas Eve of 1971, in Greenwich Village, a group of gay men and lesbians meet at the Blue Jay Bar to talk about their lives and relationships.	United States	
1971	Some of My Best Friends Are...	Jim	Gary Sandy	On Christmas Eve of 1971, in Greenwich Village, a group of gay men and lesbians meet at the Blue Jay Bar to talk about their lives and relationships.	United States	
1971	Sunday Bloody Sunday	Daniel Hirsh	Peter Finch	Hirsh is a Jewish doctor.	United Kingdom	
1971	Vanishing Point	Male hitchhiker No. 1	Anthony James	The two men hitchhike while standing next to a broken-down car with a "Just Married" sign on the back. Kowalski picks them up and they attempt to rob him before he throws them out of the car.	United States, United Kingdom	
1971	Vanishing Point	Male hitchhiker No. 2	Arthur Malet	The two men hitchhike while standing next to a broken-down car with a "Just Married" sign on the back. Kowalski picks them up and they attempt to rob him before he throws them out of the car.	United States, United Kingdom	
1971	Villain	Vic Dakin	Richard Burton	Dakin is a ruthless and sadistic London gangster.	United Kingdom	
1971	Whity	Frank Nicholson	Ulli Lommel	Frank is a member of the dysfunctional Nicholson family in the American southwest in 1878.	West Germany	
1972	Blacula	Bobby McCoy	Ted Harris	Bobby and Billy are lovers and interior decorators. They purchase the coffin containing Blacula and ship it to Los Angeles, becoming his first victims.	United States	
1972	Blacula	Billy Schaffer	Rick Metzler	Bobby and Billy are lovers and interior decorators. They purchase the coffin containing Blacula and ship it to Los Angeles, becoming his first victims.	United States	
1972	Georgia, Georgia	Herbert Thompson	Roger Furman	Herbert is Georgia's manager.	United States	
1972	Pete 'n' Tillie	Jimmy Twitchell	René Auberjonois	Jimmy is Tillie's close friend.	United States	
1972	Play It as It Lays	B.Z. Mendenhall	Anthony Perkins	B.Z. is a suicidal movie producer and best friend of Maria.	United States	
1972	X Y & Zee	Gordon	John Standing	Gordon is a close friend of Zee's.	United Kingdom	
1973	A Bigger Splash	David Hockney	Himself	Semi-fictionalized documentary biopic about Hockney.	United Kingdom	
1973	A Bigger Splash	Peter Schlesinger	Himself	Semi-fictionalized documentary biopic about Hockney.	United Kingdom	
1973	Day for Night	Alexandre	Jean-Pierre Aumont	Alexandre is an actor whose lover is killed in a car accident.	France	
1973	The Day of the Jackal	Bernard	Anton Rodgers	Bernard is picked up by the Jackel at a Turkish bathhouse and murdered.	United Kingdom	
1973	The Last of Sheila	Tom Parkman	Richard Benjamin	Screenwriter Parkman is a guest on a one-week Mediterranean pleasure cruise aboard the yacht of movie producer Clinton Greene.	United States	
1973	Ludwig	Ludwig II of Bavaria	Helmut Berger	Ludwig has doubts if he can be a good husband to Sophie who loves him, and he postpones and eventually cancels the marriage. Instead, he starts having relationships with his servants, although being a devout Catholic makes him feel guilt about his homosexuality.	Italy, France, West Germany	
1973	Papillon	André Maturette	Robert Deman	Maturette is an orderly and fellow prisoner who assists Papillon in his escape plot from a labor camp in French Guiana.	United States	
1973	Scarecrow	Riley	Richard Lynch	Riley is an inmate who sexually assaults Lion in prison.	United States	
1973	Sleeper	Jeb Hrmthmg	Spencer Milligan	Jeb is a futuristic man that has a gay robot.	United States	
1973	Summer Wishes, Winter Dreams	Bobby Walden	Ron Rickards	Bobby comes out to his parents at 15 and later moves to Amsterdam.	United States	
1973	The Tenderness of Wolves	Fritz Haarmann	Kurt Raab	Based on the crimes of German serial killer and cannibal Fritz Haarmann.	West Germany	
1973	Theatre of Blood	Meredith Merridew	Robert Morley	Meredith is the theatre critic who wears a pink suit and has two poodles.	United Kingdom	
1974	125 Rooms of Comfort	Billie Joyce	Tim Henry	Billie is left with ownership of his father's hotel after he dies.	Canada	
1974	Butley	Ben Butley	Alan Bates	Butley, a literature professor and longtime T. S. Eliot scholar with a recently developed interest in Beatrix Potter, is a suicidal alcoholic, who loses his wife and his male lover on the same day.	United States, Canada, United Kingdom	
1974	The Conversation	Martin Stett	Harrison Ford	Martin is the Director's loyal assistant.	United States	
1974	The Night Porter	Bert	Amedeo Amodio	Bert is a German dancer.	Italy	
1974	The Taking of Pelham One Two Three	Subway passenger	Gary Bolling	Based on the 1973 novel of the same name	United States	
1974	The Tamarind Seed	Fergus Stephenson	Dan O'Herlihy	Stephenson is a conduit of state secrets.	United States	
1974	A Very Natural Thing	David	Robert Joel	David is a public school teacher and former monastic monk. He meets Mark at a disco. After their relationship ends he meets Jason, a photographer who came out after divorcing his wife. Containing documentary footage of the Christopher Street Liberation Day March in New York City (known today as NYC Pride March).	United States	
1974	A Very Natural Thing	Mark	Curt Gareth	David is a public school teacher and former monastic monk. He meets Mark at a disco. After their relationship ends he meets Jason, a photographer who came out after divorcing his wife. Containing documentary footage of the Christopher Street Liberation Day March in New York City (known today as NYC Pride March).	United States	
1974	A Very Natural Thing	Jason	Bo White	David is a public school teacher and former monastic monk. He meets Mark at a disco. After their relationship ends he meets Jason, a photographer who came out after divorcing his wife. Containing documentary footage of the Christopher Street Liberation Day March in New York City (known today as NYC Pride March).	United States	
1974	A Very Natural Thing	Alan	Jay Pierce	David is a public school teacher and former monastic monk. He meets Mark at a disco. After their relationship ends he meets Jason, a photographer who came out after divorcing his wife. Containing documentary footage of the Christopher Street Liberation Day March in New York City (known today as NYC Pride March).	United States	
1975	Barry Lyndon	British Soldier	Anthony Dawes	While on the run, Barry stumbles upon two soldiers in a pond, naked and holding hands, professing their love for each other. He takes the uniform of one of the men in an attempt to steal his identity.	United States, United Kingdom	
1975	Deep Red	Carlo Manganiello	Gabriele Lavia	Carlo is Marucs' best friend.	Italy	
1975	The Eiger Sanction	Miles Mellough	Jack Cassidy	Miles is an assassin.	United States	
1975	Fox and His Friends	Franz "Fox" Bieberkopf	Rainer Werner Fassbinder	Fox is a working-class man who wins the lottery.	West Germany	
1975	Funny Lady	Bobby Moore	Roddy McDowall	Bobby is Fanny's assistant and friend.	United States	
1975	In Celebration	Colin Shaw	James Bolam	Shaws' son Colin, who was a Communist party member for a year, is now a prosperous but unfulfilled industrial relations manager for a car manufacturer, dealing with negotiations with the unions.	United Kingdom, United States	
1975	Mahogany	Sean McAvoy	Anthony Perkins	Sean is a fashion designer who works with Tracy.	United States	
1975	One Flew Over the Cuckoo's Nest	Dale Harding	William Redfield	Dale is a patient at the mental institution.	United States	
1975	Saturday Night at the Baths	Scotti	Don Scotti	Scotti manages a bathhouse and falls in love with Michael, a bisexual piano player.	United States	
1975	The Sunday Woman	Massimo Campi	Jean-Louis Trintignant	Massimo is Anna's best friend.	Italy, France	
1976	The Hunter Will Get You	Gilbert ("L'Epervier")	Bruno Cremer	Gilbert is a killer and crook who has feelings for a young man he hires to rob a jewelry store.	France	
1976	The Best Way to Walk	Marc	Patrick Dewaere	In a vacation camp somewhere in the French country in 1960, Marc and Philippe are two of the counsellors.	France	
1976	The Best Way to Walk	Philippe	Patrick Bouchitey	In a vacation camp somewhere in the French country in 1960, Marc and Philippe are two of the counsellors.	France	
1976	Car Wash	Lindy	Antonio Fargas	Lindy is the flamboyant, yet unashamed employee of the car wash.	United States	
1976	Coup de Grâce	Erich von Lhomond	Matthias Habich	Lhomond is the leader of a group of soldiers in Russian Civil War that followed the Bolshevik Revolution	West Germany, France	
1976	Drum	Bernard DeMarigny	John Colicos	Bernard is a villainous plantation owner in 19th century New Orleans.	United States	
1976	Face to Face	Dr. Tomas Jacobi	Erland Josephson	Dr. Jacobi is a close friend of Dr. Jenny.	Sweden	
1976	The Man Who Fell to Earth	Oliver V. Farnsworth	Buck Henry	Oliver is a lawyer and Newton's business partner.	United Kingdom	
1976	Next Stop, Greenwich Village	Bernstein	Antonio Fargas	Bernstein has a Norwegian lover and becomes close friends with Larry and Sarah after they move to Greenwich Village.	United States	
1976	Norman... Is That You?	Garson Hobart	Dennis Dugan	Norman is Ben's only child. Garson is Norman's lover.	United States	
1976	Norman... Is That You?	Norman Chambers	Michael Warren	Norman is Ben's only child. Garson is Norman's lover.	United States	
1976	Ode to Billy Joe	Billy Joe McAllister	Robby Benson	Billy Joe is a high school student in Mississippi who jumps off of a bridge due to the shame he feels for his sexuality.	United States	
1976	The Ritz	Chris	F. Murray Abraham	Chris befriends Jack, a heterosexual businessman who goes into hiding from his murderous mobster brother-in-law at a gay bathhouse in Manhattan. Chris shows him the ropes. Claude is the "chubby chaser" who regularly patronizes the bathhouse.	United States	
1976	The Ritz	Claude Perkins	Paul B. Price	Chris befriends Jack, a heterosexual businessman who goes into hiding from his murderous mobster brother-in-law at a gay bathhouse in Manhattan. Chris shows him the ropes. Claude is the "chubby chaser" who regularly patronizes the bathhouse.	United States	
1976	Sebastiane	Sebastian	Leonardo Treviglio	The events of the life of Saint Sebastian, including his iconic martyrdom by arrows.	United Kingdom	
1976	Swashbuckler	Lord Durant	Peter Boyle	Durant is the tyrannical and cruel governor of Jamaica.	United States	
1977	The Choirboys	Blaney	Michael MacKenzie Wills	Blaney is a closeted high school student who is murdered.	United States	
1977	Hidden Pleasures	Eduardo	Simón Andreu	Eduardo is a middle-aged, closeted banker from a wealthy family, who falls in love with a much younger heterosexual man.	Spain	
1977	Looking for Mr. Goodbar	Gary	Tom Berenger	Gary is a repressed homosexual who flies into a rage and murders Theresa when she suggests that he might be gay. Inspired by the 1973 murder of New York City schoolteacher Roseann Quinn.	United States	
1977	Outrageous!	Robin Turner	Craig Russell	Robin is a hairstylist who creates a drag act to earn extra money after his schizophrenic friend, Liza, becomes pregnant and needs to move in with him.	Canada	
1977	The Private Files of J. Edgar Hoover	J. Edgar Hoover	Broderick Crawford	Fictionalized chronicle of forty years in the life of FBI director J. Edgar Hoover, from his earliest days in the FBI in the 1920s until his death in 1972.	United States	
1977	Rituals	Martin	Robin Gammell	Martin is one of five doctors who are targeted by a killer while they are on group camping trip for the weekend.	Canada	
1977	A Special Day	Gabriele	Marcello Mastroianni	Set in Rome in 1938, the narrative follows Antonietta and her neighbor, Gabriele, who stay home the day Adolf Hitler visits Benito Mussolini; the same day that Gabriele comes out to her.	Italy, Canada	
1977	To an Unknown God	José	Héctor Alterio	José is an aging man coming to terms with his homosexuality and mortality.	Spain	
1978	The Betsy	Loren Hardeman Jr.	Paul Ryan Rudd	Loren is the closeted son of a tycoon.	United States	
1978	The Big Sleep	Arthur Geiger	John Justin	Geiger is a homosexual pornographer.	United States, United Kingdom	
1978	Bloodbrothers	Paulie	Bruce French	Paulie is a jewelry salesman who has a strained relationship with his father.	United States	
1978	California Suite	Sidney Cochran	Michael Caine	Sidney is a closeted antique dealer and husband of movie star, Diane Barrie.	United States	
1978	A Different Story	Albert Walreavens	Perry King	A man and a lesbian who become temporary housemates end up falling in love with each other. Film critic Janet Maslin's original review elaborates: "The movie's use of [Albert and Stella's] homosexuality is indeed exploitative, insensitive, and offensive in a variety of ways. Even worse, it is unconvincing ... Albert's homosexuality is nothing but a gimmick, something for the screenplay to coax him out of."	United States	
1978	El diputado	Roberto Orbea	José Sacristán	Roberto gets elected as Deputy and falls in love with Juanito.	Spain	
1978	El diputado	Juanito	José Luis Alonso	Roberto gets elected as Deputy and falls in love with Juanito.	Spain	
1978	La Cage aux Folles	Renato Baldi	Ugo Tognazzi	Renato and Albin are a couple operating a drag nightclub in a French resort town.	France, Italy	
1978	La Cage aux Folles	Albin Mougeotte	Michel Serrault	Renato and Albin are a couple operating a drag nightclub in a French resort town.	France, Italy	
1978	Midnight Express	Erich	Norbert Weisser	Erich is a Swedish drug smuggler.	United States	
1978	Nighthawks	Jim	Ken Robertson	Jim is a geography teacher who goes to gay pubs at night. His students ultimately challenge him with questions as to whether he is "bent" (i.e. homosexual). He responds that he is and answers their questions about his homosexuality calmly.	United Kingdom	
1979	10	Hugh	Robert Webber	Hugh is George's best friend.	United States	
1979	Ernesto	Ernesto	Martin Halm	In Trieste, Austria-Hungary (Italy after the end of World War I) in 1911, Ernesto (Martin Halm) is a 17-year-old boy who lives with his widowed mother in the home of his violin-loving Jewish uncle and works in an office at a routine job. He espouses socialist views largely to cause his uncle distress.	Italy, Spain, West Germany	
1979	Ernesto	The Man / The stableman	Michele Placido	In Trieste, Austria-Hungary (Italy after the end of World War I) in 1911, Ernesto (Martin Halm) is a 17-year-old boy who lives with his widowed mother in the home of his violin-loving Jewish uncle and works in an office at a routine job. He espouses socialist views largely to cause his uncle distress.	Italy, Spain, West Germany	
1979	Hot Potato	Claudio	Massimo Ranieri	Claudio is a frail young mana involved in a fascist gang beating.	Italy	
1979	Saint Jack	Senator	George Lazenby	The subplot involves a closeted and married conservative senator who flies to Singapore to pick up male prostitutes.	United States	
1979	Savage Weekend	Nicky	Christopher Allport	Nicky is one of the members of a friend group who go away for the weekend and are stalked by a masked killer.	United States	
1979	To Forget Venice	Nicky	Erland Josephson	Nicky has resided in Milan for three years with his partner Picchio.	Italy	

== 1980s ==
List
Year	Title	Character(s)	Actor	Notes	Country	Ref(s)
1980	American Gigolo	Leon James	Bill Duke	James is Julian's pimp.	United States	
1980	Cruising	Ted Bailey	Don Scardino	Ted is the next-door neighbor of undercover cop Steve. The two become friends while Steve works to track down a serial killer targeting gay men. Gregory is Ted's boyfriend.	United States	
1980	Cruising	Gregory	James Remar	Ted is the next-door neighbor of undercover cop Steve. The two become friends while Steve works to track down a serial killer targeting gay men. Gregory is Ted's boyfriend.	United States	
1980	Fame	Montgomery MacNeil	Paul McCrane	Montgomery is a student in the Drama department who comes out to his peers during their second year.	United States	
1980	Happy Birthday, Gemini	Francis Geminiani	Alan Rosenberg	On the eve of his 21st birthday, Francis realizes that he is in love with his girlfriend's brother, Randy.	United States	
1980	The Last Married Couple in America	Donald	Stewart Moss	Donald and Reggie are the neighbors of Jeff and Marie. While most couples that Jeff and Marie know have crumbling relationships, Donald and Reggie are well adjusted and happy.	United States	
1980	The Last Married Couple in America	Reggie	Colby Chester	Donald and Reggie are the neighbors of Jeff and Marie. While most couples that Jeff and Marie know have crumbling relationships, Donald and Reggie are well adjusted and happy.	United States	
1980	Life and Death	John	[actor name N/A]	A medical student.	Norway	
1980	The Long Good Friday	Colin	Paul Freeman	Colin is the underworld lieutenant whose murder triggers a bloodbath.	United Kingdom	
1980	Nijinsky	Sergei Diaghilev	Alan Bates	Nijinsky was driven into madness by both his consuming ambition and self-enforced heterosexuality. Diaghilev is an impresario.	United States	
1980	Nijinsky	Vaslav Nijinsky	George de la Peña	Nijinsky was driven into madness by both his consuming ambition and self-enforced heterosexuality. Diaghilev is an impresario.	United States	
1980	Serial	Luckman	Christopher Lee	Luckman is an executive headhunter by day and the head of a motorcycle gang by night.	United States	
1980	Squeeze	Paul	Paul Eady	Paul is a timid young man who develops a relationship with bisexual businessman, Grant.	New Zealand	
1980	Stir Crazy	Rory Schultebrand	Georg Stanford Brown	Rory is a drag queen and an inmate at the prison where Skip and Harry end up after being wrongfully convicted.	United States	
1980	Taxi zum Klo	Frank	Frank Ripploh	Frank ponders whether to continue a life on anonymous sex or settle down with his eventual boyfriend, Bernd.	West Germany	
1980	Taxi zum Klo	Bernd	Bernd Broaderup	Frank ponders whether to continue a life on anonymous sex or settle down with his eventual boyfriend, Bernd.	West Germany	
1981	Butcher, Baker, Nightmare Maker	Phil Brody	Caskey Swaim	Landers is Billy and Eddie's basketball coach.	United States	
1981	Butcher, Baker, Nightmare Maker	Coach Tom Landers	Steve Eastin	Landers is Billy and Eddie's basketball coach.	United States	
1981	The Fan	Douglas Breen	Michael Biehn	Douglas is the obsessed fan of film star Sally Ross.	United States	
1981	Knightriders	Pippin	Warner Shook	Troupe member Pippin comes to terms with his homosexuality and finds love with Punch.	United States	
1981	Mad Max 2	The Golden Youth	Jimmy Brown	The Golden Youth is a punk on a motorcycle in post-nuclear society.	Australia	
1981	Only When I Laugh	Jimmy Perry	James Coco	Jimmy a struggling actor and the best friend of Georgia.	United States	
1981	The Woman Next Door	Roland Duguet	Roger Van Hool		France	
1981	Zorro, the Gay Blade	Bunny Wigglesworth	George Hamilton	Wigglesworth is Zorro's twin brother.	United States	
1982	Angel	Angelos	Michalis Maniatis	Michalis is a young man in Athens, Angelos, who keeps his sexual identity a secret from his family. He falls hard for a rough sailor, Mihalis, and moves in with him.	Greece	
1982	The Clinic	Dr. Eric Linden	Chris Haywood	Linden is a doctor at Melbourne VD (venereal disease) clinic.	Australia	
1982	Deathtrap	Sidney Bruhl	Michael Caine	Sidney and Clifford are lovers trying to do away with Sidney's wife.	United States	
1982	Deathtrap	Clifford Anderson	Christopher Reeve	Sidney and Clifford are lovers trying to do away with Sidney's wife.	United States	
1982	Drifting	Robi	Jonathan Sagall	Robi is a young man trying to find love and break into the movie business.	Israel	
1982	Evil Under the Sun	Rex Brewster	Roddy McDowall	Rex is a gossip columnist in the process of writing a biography of Arlene Stuart Marshall.	United Kingdom	
1982	Forty Deuce	Ricky	Kevin Bacon	Ricky is a street hustler in Times Square.	United States	
1982	Labyrinth of Passion	Riza Niro	Imanol Arias	Niro is the son of the Emperor of Tiran (a fictional Middle Eastern country).	Spain	
1982	Labyrinth of Passion	Sadec	Antonio Banderas	Niro is the son of the Emperor of Tiran (a fictional Middle Eastern country).	Spain	
1982	Luc or His Share of Things	Luc	Pierre Normandin	After coming out as gay, Luc grapples with depression and suicidal thoughts but is saved by the acceptance and support of his friends, François and Louis.	Canada	
1982	Making Love	Zack Elliot	Michael Ontkean	Considered a Hollywood landmark film, for its portrayal of the relationship between Zack and Bart as equally valid to a heterosexual one.	United States	
1982	Making Love	Bart McGuire	Harry Hamlin	Considered a Hollywood landmark film, for its portrayal of the relationship between Zack and Bart as equally valid to a heterosexual one.	United States	
1982	Night Shift	Prisoner	Charles Fleischer	Fleischer has a cameo as a Prisoner in the film.	United States	
1982	Partners	Kerwin	John Hurt	Officer Kerwin is a Records Clerk.	United States	
1982	Privates on Parade	Capt. Terri Dennis	Denis Quilley	Dennis is the military drag queen in the movie.	United Kingdom	
1982	Victor/Victoria	Carroll "Toddy" Todd	Robert Preston	Toddy is an aging performer at Club Chez Lui in Paris.	United Kingdom, United States	
1982	Victor/Victoria	'Squash' Bernstein	Alex Karras	Toddy is an aging performer at Club Chez Lui in Paris.	United Kingdom, United States	
1982	The Year of Living Dangerously	Wally O'Sullivan	Noel Ferrier	Wally is an Australian journalist.	United States, Australia	
1983	The Dresser	Norman	Tom Courtenay	During World War II, Norman works as a dresser who falls in love with an actor he serves.	United Kingdom	
1983	Merry Christmas, Mr. Lawrence	Capt. Yonoi	Ryuichi Sakamoto	Capt. Yonoi is the commander of the POW camp in Lebak Sembada in Japanese-occupied Java in 1942.	United Kingdom	
1983	Self Defense	Daniel	Terry-David Després	While the police are on strike, a fascist group goes to a gay bar and begins murdering the patrons. Daniel is the sole bar patron that escapes and he takes refuge in a local apartment.	Canada	
1983	Sleepaway Camp	John Baker	Dan Tursi	Baker and his boyfriend, Lenny, take John's children Angela and Peter on a boating trip.	United States	
1983	Sleepaway Camp	Lenny	James Paradise	Baker and his boyfriend, Lenny, take John's children Angela and Peter on a boating trip.	United States	
1983	Staying Alive	Butler	Charles Ward	Butler is replaced as the lead dancer in a Broadway show by Tony.	United States	
1983	Streamers	Richie	Mitchell Lichtenstein	In 1965, four young soldiers waiting to be shipped to Vietnam deal with racial tension and their own intolerance when Richie reveals his sexuality.	United States	
1983	To Be or Not to Be	Sasha	James Haake	Sasha is Anna's dresser.	United States	
1983	Without a Trace	Philippe	Keith McDermott	Philippe is Susan's housecleaner.	United States	
1984	Another Country	Guy Bennett	Rupert Everett	Explorating Bennett's homosexuality and exposure to Marxism, while examining the hypocrisy and snobbery of the English public school system.	United Kingdom	
1984	Another Country	James Harcourt	Cary Elwes	Explorating Bennett's homosexuality and exposure to Marxism, while examining the hypocrisy and snobbery of the English public school system.	United Kingdom	
1984	Beverly Hills Cop	Serge	Bronson Pinchot	Serge is an art dealer.	United States	
1984	Garbo Talks	Bernie Whitlock	Harvey Fierstein	Bernie is a kindhearted man on Fire Island who helps Gilbert find reclusive Hollywood legend Greta Garbo for his mother as her dying wish.	United States	
1984	Horror Vacui	Frankie	Folkert Milster	Hannes attempts to save his lover, Frankie, by stopping him from joining a religious cult.	West Germany	
1984	Horror Vacui	Hannes	Tom Vogt	Hannes attempts to save his lover, Frankie, by stopping him from joining a religious cult.	West Germany	
1984	The Hotel New Hampshire	Frank	Paul McCrane	Frank is one of the Berry's kid.	United States, United Kingdom, Canada	
1984	Irreconcilable Differences	Howard Kay	Richard Minchenberg	Howard becomes Lucy's secretary after she achieves great success as a writer.	United States	
1984	La Muerte de Mikel	Mikel	Imanol Arias	Mikel falls in love with a drag queen and is murdered by his mother.	Spain	
1984	La Muerte de Mikel	Fama	Fernando Telletxea	Mikel falls in love with a drag queen and is murdered by his mother.	Spain	
1984	Mass Appeal	Deacon Mark Dolson	Željko Ivanek	Seminarian Mark Dolson questions Farley's position on the ordination of women.	United States	
1984	Meatballs Part II	Lieutenant Felix Foxglove	John Larroquette	Felix is the closeted assistant of Colonel Hershy.	United States	
1984	Mike's Murder	Philip Green	Paul Winfield	Philip is the sympathetic and straightforward record producer who was in a relationship with Mike prior to his murder.	United States	
1984	Monaco Forever	Karate Man	Jean-Claude Van Damme	Marking the first (although brief) appearance of Jean-Claude Van Damme	United States	
1984	Protocol	Jerry	Grainger Hines	Jerry and Ben are in a committed relationship and are the roommates of Sunny.	United States	
1984	Protocol	Ben	Joel Brooks	Jerry and Ben are in a committed relationship and are the roommates of Sunny.	United States	
1984	Revenge of the Nerds	Lamar Lutrell	Larry B. Scott	Lamar is an openly fraternity member.	United States	
1985	Adiós, Roberto	Marcelo	Víctor Laplace	Marcelo is the roommate of Roberto.	Argentina	
1985	After Hours	Mark	Robert Plunket	Mark is a novelist who picks up Paul.	United States	
1985	The Boys Next Door	Chris	Paul C. Dancer	Chris is the ill-fated gay bar patron who unknowingly invites two killers to his apartment on the evening of their murder spree.	United States	
1985	Buddies	Robert Willow	Geoff Edholm	David is the volunteer "buddy" from the Gay Center who is assigned to help care for Robert, who is dying of AIDS. The film explores how David copes with Robert's illness and death. It is the first narrative film about the AIDS crisis, preceding television film, An Early Frost (also released in 1985).	United States	
1985	Buddies	Steve	David Rose	David is the volunteer "buddy" from the Gay Center who is assigned to help care for Robert, who is dying of AIDS. The film explores how David copes with Robert's illness and death. It is the first narrative film about the AIDS crisis, preceding television film, An Early Frost (also released in 1985).	United States	
1985	A Chorus Line	Paul San Marco	Cameron English	San Marco and Walter are part of the dancers auditioning for a part in a new Broadway musical.	United States	
1985	A Chorus Line	Greg Gardner	Justin Ross	San Marco and Walter are part of the dancers auditioning for a part in a new Broadway musical.	United States	
1985	Colonel Redl	Colonel Alfred Redl	Klaus Maria Brandauer	Redl is head of the Austrian Imperial Secret Service who gets exposed as a spy.	West Germany	
1985	Dona Herlinda and Her Son	Ramón	Arturo Meza	Rodolfo, a young bachelor doctor, has a love affair with a younger music student, Ramón.	Mexico	
1985	Kiss of the Spider Woman	Luis Molina	William Hurt	Luis is a prisoner who survives through recreating old movie fantasies. (Hurt won an Academy Award for his performance.)	United States	
1985	Mishima: A Life in Four Chapters	Yukio Mishima	Ken Ogata	Depicting the life and work of the eponymous writer and activist.	United States	
1985	My Beautiful Laundrette	Omar Ali	Gordon Warnecke	Focusing on Omar, a young Pakistani man living in London, and his reunion and eventual romance with his childhood friend Johnny.	United Kingdom	
1985	My Beautiful Laundrette	Johnny	Daniel Day-Lewis	Focusing on Omar, a young Pakistani man living in London, and his reunion and eventual romance with his childhood friend Johnny.	United Kingdom	
1985	A Nightmare on Elm Street 2: Freddy's Revenge	Coach Schneider	Marshall Bell	Jesse is caught by Schneider ordering a drink in a gay bar and is made to run laps at school as punishment.	United States	
1985	Once Bitten	Sebastian	Cleavon Little	Sebastian is the flamboyant, stereotypically servant to the Countess. The film contains a running gag of Sebastian continuously "coming out" of the Countess' closet.	United States	
1985	Spies Like Us	Russian Rocket Crew Member No. 1	Bjarne Thomsen	The two Russian crew members go off arm in arm into the woods.	United States	
1985	Spies Like Us	Russian Rocket Crew Member No. 2	Sergei Rousakov	The two Russian crew members go off arm in arm into the woods.	United States	
1985	St. Elmo's Fire	Ron Dellasandro	Matthew Laurance	Dellasandro is Jules' neighbor.	United States	
1985	Westler	Felix	Sigurd Rachman	Felix and Thomas are lovers who are divided by the Berlin Wall.	West Germany	
1985	Westler	Thomas	Rainer Strecker	Felix and Thomas are lovers who are divided by the Berlin Wall.	West Germany	
1986	Absolute Beginners	Henley of Mayfair	James Fox	Suzette plans to marry the middle-aged, homosexual Henley for her career.	United Kingdom	
1986	Caravaggio	Caravaggio	Nigel Terry	Fictionalised retelling of the life of Baroque painter Michelangelo Merisi da Caravaggio.	United Kingdom	
1986	Caravaggio	Jerusaleme	Spencer Leigh	Fictionalised retelling of the life of Baroque painter Michelangelo Merisi da Caravaggio.	United Kingdom	
1986	The Decline of the American Empire	Claude	Yves Jacques	Claude speaks about pursuing men reckless of fear of STDs, while secretly being fearful of having one to his friends.	Canada	
1986	Mala Noche	Walt Curtis	Tim Streeter	Walt falls in love with Mexican migrant, Johnny.	United States	
1986	The Morning After	Frankie	James Haake	Frankie is the drag queen friend of Alex, who lets her borrow clothing while she is on the run from the police for suspicion of murder.	United States	
1986	Parting Glances	Michael	Richard Ganoung	One of the first motion pictures to deal frankly and realistically with the subject of AIDS and the impact of the relatively new disease on the gay community in the Ronald Reagan era and at the height of the pandemic.	United States	
1986	Parting Glances	Nick	Steve Buscemi	One of the first motion pictures to deal frankly and realistically with the subject of AIDS and the impact of the relatively new disease on the gay community in the Ronald Reagan era and at the height of the pandemic.	United States	
1986	Parting Glances	Robert	John Bolger	One of the first motion pictures to deal frankly and realistically with the subject of AIDS and the impact of the relatively new disease on the gay community in the Ronald Reagan era and at the height of the pandemic.	United States	
1986	Tough Guys	Bar Patron	Matthew Faison	Long was asked by the bar patron for a dance in a gay bar.	United States	
1987	Beyond Therapy	Bob	Christopher Guest	Bob is Bruce's jealous live-in lover who decides to assert himself and do everything possible to maintain his status quo.	United States	
1987	Friends Forever	Patrick	Thomas Sigsgaard	Partrick is the best friend of the main protagonist, Kristian, and develops a relationship with Mads, the captain of the soccer team.	Denmark	
1987	Friends Forever	Mads	Morten Stig Christensen	Partrick is the best friend of the main protagonist, Kristian, and develops a relationship with Mads, the captain of the soccer team.	Denmark	
1987	The Heart Exposed	Jean-Marc	Gilles Renaud	Jean-Marc and Mathieu fall in love despite a ten-year age difference and the complication that Mathieu is the father of a five-year-old son.	Canada	
1987	The Heart Exposed	Mathieu	Michel Poirier	Jean-Marc and Mathieu fall in love despite a ten-year age difference and the complication that Mathieu is the father of a five-year-old son.	Canada	
1987	Law of Desire	Pablo Quintero	Eusebio Poncela	Focusing on a complex love triangle between three men. Pablo, a successful film director, disappointed in his relationship with his young lover, Juan, concentrates in a new project, a monologue starring his transgender sister, Tina. Antonio, an uptight young man, falls possessively in love with the director, and in his passion would stop at nothing to obtain the object of his desire.	Spain	
1987	Law of Desire	Antonio Benítez	Antonio Banderas	Focusing on a complex love triangle between three men. Pablo, a successful film director, disappointed in his relationship with his young lover, Juan, concentrates in a new project, a monologue starring his transgender sister, Tina. Antonio, an uptight young man, falls possessively in love with the director, and in his passion would stop at nothing to obtain the object of his desire.	Spain	
1987	Law of Desire	Juan	Miguel Molina	Focusing on a complex love triangle between three men. Pablo, a successful film director, disappointed in his relationship with his young lover, Juan, concentrates in a new project, a monologue starring his transgender sister, Tina. Antonio, an uptight young man, falls possessively in love with the director, and in his passion would stop at nothing to obtain the object of his desire.	Spain	
1987	Maurice	Clive Durham	Hugh Grant	Hall struggles to fit into society, and ultimately united with his life partner.	United Kingdom	
1987	Maurice	Maurice Hall	James Wilby	Hall struggles to fit into society, and ultimately united with his life partner.	United Kingdom	
1987	Maurice	Alec Scudder	Rupert Graves	Hall struggles to fit into society, and ultimately united with his life partner.	United Kingdom	
1987	A Month in the Country	James Moon	Kenneth Branagh	Moon is an archaeologist and a war veteran who forms a close friendship with Birkin.	United Kingdom	
1987	No Way Out	Scott Pritchard	Will Patton	Pritchard is the general counsel to Brice.	United States	
1987	Prick Up Your Ears	Joe Orton	Gary Oldman	Playwright Joe Orton and Kenneth Halliwell are lovers.	United Kingdom	
1987	Prick Up Your Ears	Kenneth Halliwell	Alfred Molina	Playwright Joe Orton and Kenneth Halliwell are lovers.	United Kingdom	
1987	Radio Days	Fred	Robert Joy	Fred's coming out is treated with compassion and understanding by his girlfriend, Bea, when he bursts into tears after hearing "I'm Getting Sentimental Over You", a song which reminds him of his departed lover.	United States	
1987	Stage Fright	Brett	Giovanni Lombardo Radice	Brett is one of the actors in a theater troupe being targeted by a killer wearing an owl mask.	Italy	
1987	Tough Guys Don't Dance	Lonnie Pangborn	R. Patrick Sullivan	Pangborn is Pond's effete husband	United States	
1987	Withnail and I	Monty	Richard Griffiths	Monty is Withnail's Uncle.	United Kingdom	
1988	The Fruit Machine	Eddie	Emile Charles	Eddie and Michael are best friends who are on the run from a killer after they witness him murdering a drag queen at a gay club called "The Fruit Machine."	United Kingdom	
1988	The Fruit Machine	Michael	Tony Forsyth	Eddie and Michael are best friends who are on the run from a killer after they witness him murdering a drag queen at a gay club called "The Fruit Machine."	United Kingdom	
1988	Madame Sousatzka	Mr. Cordle	Geoffrey Bayldon	Mr. Cordle is an osteopath who obsessively creates color-coded maps of the human body	United Kingdom, Canada	
1988	Once More	Louis	Jean-Louis Rolland	Following Louis' life through the span of 10 years.	France	
1988	Salome's Last Dance	Lord Alfred 'Bosie' Douglas	Douglas Hodge	Douglas is Oscar Wilde's lover.	United Kingdom, United States	
1988	Torch Song Trilogy	Arnold Beckoff	Harvey Fierstein	Arnold Beckoff is a Jewish homosexual, drag queen, and torch singer who lives in New York City in the late 1970s and early 1980s.	United States	
1988	Torch Song Trilogy	Alan Simon	Matthew Broderick	Arnold Beckoff is a Jewish homosexual, drag queen, and torch singer who lives in New York City in the late 1970s and early 1980s.	United States	
1988	Torch Song Trilogy	David	Eddie Castrodad	Arnold Beckoff is a Jewish homosexual, drag queen, and torch singer who lives in New York City in the late 1970s and early 1980s.	United States	
1988	We Think the World of You	Frank Meadows	Alan Bates	Frank is a middle-aged man who helps support the younger and bisexual Johnny and his family.	United Kingdom	
1989	Apartment Zero	Adrian LeDuc	Colin Firth	LeDuc is the British owner of a revival house in Buenos Aires.	United Kingdom, Argentina	
1989	Coming Out	Philipp Klarmann	Matthias Freihof	Klarmann is a high school teacher who is "coming out" and accepting himself as gay.	East Germany	
1989	Coming Out	Matthias	Dirk Kummer	Klarmann is a high school teacher who is "coming out" and accepting himself as gay.	East Germany	
1989	Fun Down There	Buddy Fields	Michael Waite	Fields is a young man leaves his small-town home in rural Upstate New York to make a new life in New York City.	United States	
1989	Fun Down There	Joseph	Nickolas B. Nagourney	Fields is a young man leaves his small-town home in rural Upstate New York to make a new life in New York City.	United States	
1989	Getting It Right	Harry	Richard Huw	Harry is the best friend of the protagonist, Gavin. Winthrop is Harry's boyfriend.	United Kingdom, United States	
1989	Getting It Right	Winthrop	Kevin Drinkwater	Harry is the best friend of the protagonist, Gavin. Winthrop is Harry's boyfriend.	United Kingdom, United States	
1989	Last Exit to Brooklyn	Harry Black	Stephen Lang	Black is a union strike overseer trying to hide his homosexuality in a bitter marriage.	West Germany, United States	
1989	Longtime Companion	David	Bruce Davison	Bruce, a wealthy man, becomes the caregiver of his lover, Sean, a soap opera writer, after he is infected with the HIV virus. The film depicts the increasing effect of HIV/AIDS on a group of gay men during eight-years, between 1981 and 1989. Willy and Fuzzy begin a relationship and move in together.	United States	
1989	Longtime Companion	Fuzzy	Stephen Caffrey	Bruce, a wealthy man, becomes the caregiver of his lover, Sean, a soap opera writer, after he is infected with the HIV virus. The film depicts the increasing effect of HIV/AIDS on a group of gay men during eight-years, between 1981 and 1989. Willy and Fuzzy begin a relationship and move in together.	United States	
1989	Longtime Companion	Sean	Mark Lamos	Bruce, a wealthy man, becomes the caregiver of his lover, Sean, a soap opera writer, after he is infected with the HIV virus. The film depicts the increasing effect of HIV/AIDS on a group of gay men during eight-years, between 1981 and 1989. Willy and Fuzzy begin a relationship and move in together.	United States	
1989	Longtime Companion	Willy	Campbell Scott	Bruce, a wealthy man, becomes the caregiver of his lover, Sean, a soap opera writer, after he is infected with the HIV virus. The film depicts the increasing effect of HIV/AIDS on a group of gay men during eight-years, between 1981 and 1989. Willy and Fuzzy begin a relationship and move in together.	United States	
1989	Looking for Langston	James	Akim Mogaji	James and Beauty fall in love in 1920s Harlem.	United Kingdom	
1989	Looking for Langston	Beauty	Matthew Baidoo	James and Beauty fall in love in 1920s Harlem.	United Kingdom	

== 1990s ==
List
Year	Title	Character(s)	Actor	Notes	Country	Ref(s)
1990	Europa Europa	Robert Kellerman	André Wilms	Robert and Solek (a Jew) hold each other's secret in solidarity while fighting in the German Army during World War II.	Germany, France, Poland	
1990	Miller's Crossing	Bernie Bernbaum	John Turturro	Bernbaum is Verna's bookie brother, who is skimming off the match fixing scheme of Leo's rival	United States	
1990	Miller's Crossing	Eddie Dane	J.E. Freeman	Bernbaum is Verna's bookie brother, who is skimming off the match fixing scheme of Leo's rival	United States	
1990	Miller's Crossing	Mink Larouie	Steve Buscemi	Bernbaum is Verna's bookie brother, who is skimming off the match fixing scheme of Leo's rival	United States	
1990	Q & A	Josè Malpica	International Chrysis	Malpica is Montalvo's lover	United States	
1990	Q & A	Roger Montalvo	Paul Calderón	Malpica is Montalvo's lover	United States	
1991	The Adjuster	Larry	Stephen Ouimette	Larry is The Butterfly Collector.	Canada	
1991	Edward II	Edward II	Steven Waddington	Based on the play of the same name by Christopher Marlowe, the film revolves around Edward II of England's infatuation with Piers Gaveston, which proves to be the downfall of both of them	United Kingdom	
1991	Edward II	Piers Gaveston	Andrew Tiernan	Based on the play of the same name by Christopher Marlowe, the film revolves around Edward II of England's infatuation with Piers Gaveston, which proves to be the downfall of both of them	United Kingdom	
1991	The Fisher King	Homeless Cabaret Singer	Michael Jeter	Jack first meets a homeless cabaret singer in a hospital, and who talks to him about losing his friends.	United States	
1991	Frankie and Johnny	Tim	Nathan Lane	Tim is Frankie's friend and neighbor and is in a relationship with Bobby.	United States	
1991	The Hours and Times	Brian Epstein	David Angus	Epstein was an English music entrepreneur who managed the Beatles.	United States	
1991	JFK	Willie O'Keefe	Kevin Bacon	Willie is a male prostitute serving five years in prison for soliciting. He was romantically involved with Clay.	United States	
1991	JFK	Clay Shaw	Tommy Lee Jones	Willie is a male prostitute serving five years in prison for soliciting. He was romantically involved with Clay.	United States	
1991	Madonna: Truth or Dare	Himself	Salim "Slam" Gauwloos	The documentary film chronicles the life of entertainer Madonna during her 1990 Blond Ambition World Tour.	United States	
1991	Madonna: Truth or Dare	Himself	Gabriel Trupin	The documentary film chronicles the life of entertainer Madonna during her 1990 Blond Ambition World Tour.	United States	
1991	My Own Private Idaho	Mikey Waters	River Phoenix	Waters is a street hustler. He embarks on a journey of personal discovery with his friend Scott Favor that takes them from Portland, Oregon, to Mike's hometown in Idaho, and then to Rome in search of Mike's mother.	United States	
1991	Naked Lunch	Yves Cloquet	Julian Sands	Cloquet is an attractive young Swiss gentleman.	Canada, United Kingdom, Japan	
1991	The Prince of Tides	Eddie Detreville	George Carlin	Detreville is Savannah's neighbor.	United States	
1991	Queens Logic	Eliot	John Malkovich	Eliot is a later friend who roomed with a group of working-class, now-thirtysomething childhood neighborhood friends in a two-bedroom apartment in Astoria, Queens as adults and is lonely but dislikes "camp" men.	United States	
1991	Young Soul Rebels	Caz	Mo Sesay	Caz is a soulboy and is in a relationship with punk Billibud.	United Kingdom	
1992	Being at Home with Claude	Yves	Roy Dupuis	Yves is a man who has just murdered his lover Claude, and is attempting to explain his reasons to the police investigator	Canada	
1992	Being at Home with Claude	Claude	Jean-François Pichette	Yves is a man who has just murdered his lover Claude, and is attempting to explain his reasons to the police investigator	Canada	
1992	Inside Monkey Zetterland	Brent Zetterland	Tate Donovan	Brent is Monkey's brother, who is a hairdresser.	United States	
1992	The Living End	Jon	Craig Gilmore	Luke is a restless and reckless drifter and Jon is a relatively timid and pessimistic film critic. Both are HIV positive.	United States	
1992	The Living End	Luke	Mike Dytri	Luke is a restless and reckless drifter and Jon is a relatively timid and pessimistic film critic. Both are HIV positive.	United States	
1992	The Long Day Closes	Bud	Leigh McCormack	Concerning a shy twelve-year-old boy, Bud, and his loving mother and siblings in Liverpool in the mid-1950s	United Kingdom	
1992	Passed Away	Boyd Pinter	Tim Curry	Pinter is Terry's former husband.	United States	
1992	Peter's Friends	Peter	Stephen Fry	Peter has inherited the family estate, and invites his friends up for the 1992-1993 New Year's weekend.	United Kingdom	
1992	Single White Female	Graham Knox	Peter Friedman	Knox is Allie's neighbor and an aspiring actor.	United States	
1992	Swoon	Richard Loeb	Daniel Schlachet	Recount of the 1924 Leopold and Loeb murder case, focusing more on the homosexuality of the killers than other films based on the case.	United States	
1992	Swoon	Nathan Leopold Jr.	Craig Chester	Recount of the 1924 Leopold and Loeb murder case, focusing more on the homosexuality of the killers than other films based on the case.	United States	
1992	When the Party's Over	Banks	Kris Kamm	Banks is an actor who is best friends with Amanda.	United States	
1993	Blue	Himself	Derek Jarman	This was Jarman's final experimental film and documents his last years while living with AIDS. It was released four months before his death.	United Kingdom	
1993	Even Cowgirls Get the Blues	The Countess	John Hurt	The Countress is a femine hygiene products mogul.	United States	
1993	Farewell My Concubine	Cheng Dieyi	Leslie Cheung	Retelling the troubled relationship between Peking opera actors Dieyi and Duan Xiaolou, and Xiaolou's wife Juxian.	British Hong Kong	
1993	Grief	Mark	Craig Chester	Mark is a writer who contemplates suicide on the one year anniversary of his lover's death.	United States	
1993	Love and Human Remains	David McMillan	Thomas Gibson	McMillan and his heterosexual, female roommate try to find love and sexual gratification in Edmonton, as a serial killer is loose in the city.	Canada	
1993	M. Butterfly	René Gallimard	Jeremy Irons	Loosely based on true events which involved French diplomat Bernard Boursicot and Chinese opera singer Shi Pei Pu.	United States	
1993	M. Butterfly	Song Liling	John Lone	Loosely based on true events which involved French diplomat Bernard Boursicot and Chinese opera singer Shi Pei Pu.	United States	
1993	Mrs. Doubtfire	Frank	Harvey Fierstein	"Uncle Frank" is Daniel's brother. He and his partner "Aunt Jack" are makeup artists.	United States	
1993	Mrs. Doubtfire	Jack	Scott Capurro	"Uncle Frank" is Daniel's brother. He and his partner "Aunt Jack" are makeup artists.	United States	
1993	Naked in New York	Chris	Ralph Macchio	Chris is Jake's best friend who kisses him during a party.	United States	
1993	Philadelphia	Andrew Beckett	Tom Hanks	Beckett was fired from his employment as a senior associate attorney at the largest corporate law firm in Philadelphia after they found out he had AIDS. Alvarez is Beckett's partner. Philadelphia is the first major Hollywood film to deal with the subject of AIDS.	United States	
1993	Philadelphia	Miguel Alvarez	Antonio Banderas	Beckett was fired from his employment as a senior associate attorney at the largest corporate law firm in Philadelphia after they found out he had AIDS. Alvarez is Beckett's partner. Philadelphia is the first major Hollywood film to deal with the subject of AIDS.	United States	
1993	Six Degrees of Separation	Paul	Will Smith	Paul is a skillful con-artist, who mysteriously appears at Kittredges' door one night, injured and bleeding	United States	
1993	Strawberry and Chocolate	Diego	Jorge Perugorría	Diego is an artist unhappy with the Castro regime's attitude toward the homosexual community as well as the censored conceptualization of culture. This is the first Cuban film to feature an unambiguously gay character.	Cuba, Mexico	
1993	This Boy's Life	Arthur Gayle	Jonah Blechman	Gayle is a misfit classmate of Toby at school whom he befriends.	United States	
1993	Tombstone	Billy	Jason Priestley	Billy is an outlaw in the Old West nicknamed "Sister Boy."	United States	
1993	The Wedding Banquet	Wai-Tung Gao	Winston Chao	Gao marries a mainland Chinese woman to placate his parents and get her a green card, while hiding the truth from his partner Simon.	Taiwan, United States	
1993	The Wedding Banquet	Simon	Mitchell Lichtenstein	Gao marries a mainland Chinese woman to placate his parents and get her a green card, while hiding the truth from his partner Simon.	Taiwan, United States	
1994	The Adventures of Priscilla, Queen of the Desert	Anthony "Tick" Belrose/Mitzi Del Bra	Hugo Weaving	Bernadette is shocked to learn that Anthony/Mitzi was not only once married to a woman but also has a son.	Australia	
1994	Der bewegte Mann	Norbert Brommer	Joachim Król	Walter is a crossdresser using the name "Waltraud".	Germany	
1994	Der bewegte Mann	Horst/Metzger	Armin Rohde	Walter is a crossdresser using the name "Waltraud".	Germany	
1994	Der bewegte Mann	Walter/Waltraud	Rufus Beck	Walter is a crossdresser using the name "Waltraud".	Germany	
1994	Double Happiness	Andrew Chau	Johnny Mah	While on the date, Chau reveals his sexuality to a relieved Jade as he describes hiding his identity and managing to only be set up once a year.	Canada	
1994	Drunken Master III	Gay bus passenger	Simon Yam	Yam played a gay bus passenger who wants to steal Sum-yuk's jade thumb ring.	Hong Kong	
1994	Ed Wood	John "Bunny" Breckinridge	Bill Murray	Bunny is Ed's drag queen friend.	United States	
1994	Four Weddings and a Funeral	Gareth	Simon Callow	Gareth and Matthew are romantic partners.	United Kingdom	
1994	Four Weddings and a Funeral	Matthew	John Hannah	Gareth and Matthew are romantic partners.	United Kingdom	
1994	A Man of No Importance	Alfred Byrne	Albert Finney	Byrne is a closeted homosexual bus conductor in 1963 Dublin. His sister tries to find him a suitable woman, but his real passion is putting on amateur theatre productions of Oscar Wilde plays, particularly Salome. The film deals with his struggle, temptation, and friendships, and how they are affected by his homosexuality.	United Kingdom, Ireland	
1994	Oh! My Three Guys	Ching Yu-hoi	Lau Ching-wan	Good friends Kau, Hoi and Fa are homosexual men. Hoi works in an advertising firm while Kau and Fa have not found a suitable job yet. Hoi's new female colleague Mei became interested in him.	British Hong Kong	
1994	Oh! My Three Guys	Fa	Dayo Wong	Good friends Kau, Hoi and Fa are homosexual men. Hoi works in an advertising firm while Kau and Fa have not found a suitable job yet. Hoi's new female colleague Mei became interested in him.	British Hong Kong	
1994	Oh! My Three Guys	Kau Ku-neung	Eric Kot	Good friends Kau, Hoi and Fa are homosexual men. Hoi works in an advertising firm while Kau and Fa have not found a suitable job yet. Hoi's new female colleague Mei became interested in him.	British Hong Kong	
1994	Prêt-à-Porter	Cy Bianco	Forest Whitaker	Bianco and Romney are fashion designers.	United States	
1994	Prêt-à-Porter	Cort Romney	Richard E. Grant	Bianco and Romney are fashion designers.	United States	
1994	Priest	Father Greg Pilkington	Linus Roache	Concerning a Roman Catholic priest (Pilkington) as he struggles with two difficulties that precipitate a crisis of faith. He meets Graham at a local gay hangout and the two embark on a physical relationship.	United Kingdom	
1994	Priest	Graham	Robert Carlyle	Concerning a Roman Catholic priest (Pilkington) as he struggles with two difficulties that precipitate a crisis of faith. He meets Graham at a local gay hangout and the two embark on a physical relationship.	United Kingdom	
1994	Pulp Fiction	Zed	Peter Greene	Zed rapes Marsellus Wallace.	United States	
1994	Reality Bites	Sammy Gray	Steve Zahn	Gray is Vickie's friend who remains celibate, not due to a fear of AIDS, but because forming a relationship would force him to come out to his conservative parents.	United States	
1994	The Sum of Us	Jeff Mitchell	Russell Crowe	Widower Harry Mitchell lives with his son Jeff, with both men struggling in their searches for true love.	Australia	
1994	Threesome	Eddy	Josh Charles	Alex falls in love and tries unsuccessfully to seduce; Eddy falls in love with Stuart; Stuart is in love with Alex.	United States	
1994	Trevor	Trevor	Brett Barsky	Following what happens to 13-year-old Trevor, a Diana Ross fan, when his crush on a schoolmate named Pinky Faraday gets discovered.	United States	
1994	Uncovered	César	John Wood	César is Julia's guardian.	United Kingdom	
1994	Wagons East	Julian Rogers	John C. McGinley	In the 1860s Wild West, Rogers is a bookseller.	United States	
1994	Wild Reeds	François Forestier	Gaël Morel	Forestier is a shy young man from the lower middle class in southwest France in 1962, is working towards his high school diploma.	France	
1995	An Awfully Big Adventure	Meredith Potter	Hugh Grant	Meredith is a manager, actor and director of a troupe.	United Kingdom	
1995	The Basketball Diaries	Swifty	Bruno Kirby	Swifty is Jim's coach.	United States	
1995	Billy Madison	Max Anderson	Josh Mostel	The principal of the elementary school, and a former masked wrestler known as the "Revolting Blob".	United States	
1995	Braveheart	Prince Edward	Peter Hanly	Edward II was the fourth son of Edward I.	United States	
1995	Carrington	Lytton Strachey	Jonathan Pryce	Lytton is the sadomasochistic lover of Roger. Lytton was a founding member of the Bloomsbury Group. His homosexuality was well known.	France, United Kingdom	
1995	Clueless	Christian Stovitz	Justin Walker	Stovitz is a fashion-conscious new student Christian Stovitz attracts Cher's attention and becomes her target for a boyfriend.	United States	
1995	Deathmaker	Fritz Haarmann	Götz George	Haarmann is a serial killer who murdered 24 young men.	Germany	
1995	Home for the Holidays	Tommy Larson	Robert Downey Jr.	Tommy married his boyfriend Jack in a beach wedding.	United States	
1995	Home for the Holidays	Jack	Sam Slovick	Tommy married his boyfriend Jack in a beach wedding.	United States	
1995	Jefferson in Paris	Richard Cosway	Simon Callow	Richard is the husband of Maria Cosway, a beautiful Anglo-Italian painter and musician.	France, United States	
1995	Jeffrey	Darius	Bryan Batt	Based on the play of the same name by Paul Rudnick,	United States	
1995	Jeffrey	Steve Howard	Michael T. Weiss	Based on the play of the same name by Paul Rudnick,	United States	
1995	Jeffrey	Jeffrey	Steven Weber	Based on the play of the same name by Paul Rudnick,	United States	
1995	Jeffrey	Sterling	Patrick Stewart	Based on the play of the same name by Paul Rudnick,	United States	
1995	Nixon	J. Edgar Hoover	Bob Hoskins	Hoover was first Director of the Federal Bureau of Investigation (FBI).	United States	
1995	Party Girl	Derrick	Anthony DeSando	Derrick is a gal bestie of Nary.	United States	
1995	Stonewall	La Miranda	Guillermo Díaz	Fictionalized account of the weeks leading up to the Stonewall riots, a seminal event in the modern American gay rights movement.	United Kingdom, United States	
1995	Stonewall	Matty Dean	Frederick Weller	Fictionalized account of the weeks leading up to the Stonewall riots, a seminal event in the modern American gay rights movement.	United Kingdom, United States	
1995	Stonewall	Vinnie	Bruce MacVittie	Fictionalized account of the weeks leading up to the Stonewall riots, a seminal event in the modern American gay rights movement.	United Kingdom, United States	
1995	Stonewall	Bostonia	Duane Boutte	Fictionalized account of the weeks leading up to the Stonewall riots, a seminal event in the modern American gay rights movement.	United Kingdom, United States	
1995	Stonewall	Ethan	Brendan Corbalis	Fictionalized account of the weeks leading up to the Stonewall riots, a seminal event in the modern American gay rights movement.	United Kingdom, United States	
1995	To Wong Foo, Thanks for Everything! Julie Newmar	Vida Boheme	Patrick Swayze	Vida and Noxeema are drag queens.	United States	
1995	To Wong Foo, Thanks for Everything! Julie Newmar	Noxeema Jackson	Wesley Snipes	Vida and Noxeema are drag queens.	United States	
1995	Total Eclipse	Arthur Rimbaud	Leonardo DiCaprio	Presenting a historical account of the passionate and violent relationship between 19th-century French poets Arthur Rimbaud and Paul Verlaine, at a time of soaring creativity for both men.	United Kingdom, France, Belgium, Italy, United States	
1995	Waiting to Exhale	David Matthews	Giancarlo Esposito	Matthews is Gloria's ex-husband and father of Tarik.	United States	
1996	Beautiful Thing	Ste Pearce	Scott Neal	Set in Thamesmead, a working class area of South East London dominated by post-war council estates, teenager Jamie is in love with his classmate, Ste	United Kingdom	
1996	Beautiful Thing	Jamie Gangel	Glen Berry	Set in Thamesmead, a working class area of South East London dominated by post-war council estates, teenager Jamie is in love with his classmate, Ste	United Kingdom	
1996	The Birdcage	Agador	Hank Azaria	A same-sex couple whose son is set to marry the daughter of a conservative senator.	United States	
1996	The Birdcage	Albert Goldman	Nathan Lane	A same-sex couple whose son is set to marry the daughter of a conservative senator.	United States	
1996	The Birdcage	Armand Goldman	Robin Williams	A same-sex couple whose son is set to marry the daughter of a conservative senator.	United States	
1996	Dream for an Insomniac	Rob	Michael Landes	Rob is apprehensive about coming out to his father.	United States	
1996	Flirting with Disaster	Paul Harmon	Richard Jenkins	Tony and Paul are ATF agents who are in a relationship with each other.	United States	
1996	Flirting with Disaster	Tony Kent	Josh Brolin	Tony and Paul are ATF agents who are in a relationship with each other.	United States	
1996	Get on the Bus	Kyle	Isaiah Washington	Kyle is an ex-Marine who is the midst of breaking up with his lover Randall.	United States	
1996	Get on the Bus	Randall	Harry Lennix	Kyle is an ex-Marine who is the midst of breaking up with his lover Randall.	United States	
1996	Hollow Reed	Martyn Wyatt	Martin Donovan	Martyn, a family doctor, married Hannah to hide his homosexuality, and they divorced after he finally came out. Tom is Martyn's lover.	Germany, United Kingdom, Spain	
1996	Hollow Reed	Tom Dixon	Ian Hart	Martyn, a family doctor, married Hannah to hide his homosexuality, and they divorced after he finally came out. Tom is Martyn's lover.	Germany, United Kingdom, Spain	
1996	I Shot Andy Warhol	Andy Warhol	Jared Harris	The life of Valerie Solanas and her relationship with the artist Andy Warhol.	United Kingdom, United States	
1996	Indian Summer	Tonio	Jason Flemyng	Tonio is a rising young star of a London ballet company. Ramon is the former star-turned-choreographer of the company, who is dying of AIDs. Jack is an older Therapist who falls in love with Tonio.	United Kingdom	
1996	Indian Summer	Jack	Antony Sher	Tonio is a rising young star of a London ballet company. Ramon is the former star-turned-choreographer of the company, who is dying of AIDs. Jack is an older Therapist who falls in love with Tonio.	United Kingdom	
1996	Indian Summer	Ramon	Anthony Higgins	Tonio is a rising young star of a London ballet company. Ramon is the former star-turned-choreographer of the company, who is dying of AIDs. Jack is an older Therapist who falls in love with Tonio.	United Kingdom	
1996	It's My Party	Nick Stark	Eric Roberts	Stark, an architect who hosted a two-day party after being diagnosed with progressive multifocal leukoencephalopathy, will fall into a state of mental lapse lasting for months until his death. He decides to host a party for his family and friends, at the end of which he will commit suicide by taking Seconal.	United States	
1996	Johns	Donner	Lukas Haas	Donner is a fellow hustler who's new to the streets and has fallen for John.	United States	
1996	Killer Condom	Luigi Mackeroni	Udo Samel	Mackeroni is a detective investigating the case of a murderous condom.	Germany, Switzerland	
1996	Mrs. Winterbourne	Paco	Miguel Sandoval	Paco is the loyal chauffeur of the Winterbournes.	United States	
1996	Mulholland Falls	Jimmy Fields	Andrew McCarthy	Allison's friend, Jimmy Fields, admits that he and Allison made numerous such films, including one with Hoover in it.	United States	
1996	Sling Blade	Vaughn Cunningham	John Ritter	Cunningham is Linda's friend and boss.	United States	
1996	Stealing Beauty	Alex Parrish	Jeremy Irons	Parrish is a dying English writer and a guest at the Tuscan villa of the Graysons.	United Kingdom	
1996	When the Cat's Away	Michel	Olivier Py	Michel is a friend of Chloé who she shares an apartment with.	France	
1996	Who's the Woman, Who's the Man?	Auntie	Eric Tsang	Auntie is Sam's manager.	Hong Kong	
1997	All Over Me	Luke	Pat Briggs	Jesse is Claude's co-worker at the pizzeria. Luke is a musician who has just moved into Claude's apartment building.	United States	
1997	All Over Me	Jesse	Wilson Cruz	Jesse is Claude's co-worker at the pizzeria. Luke is a musician who has just moved into Claude's apartment building.	United States	
1997	As Good as It Gets	Simon Bishop	Greg Kinnear	Simon is an artist living in Manhattan. We learn that his parents kicked him out for being homosexual and was abused by his father because of it. Homophobic neighbor Melvin Udall uses derogatory terms when referring to Simon, but after Simon is brutally attacked he becomes the caretaker of Simon's dog, Verdell.	United States	
1997	Bent	Max	Clive Owen	Max is a promiscuous man living in 1930s Berlin. He is at odds with his wealthy family because of his homosexuality.	United Kingdom, Japan	
1997	Bent	Ruby	Brian Webber II	Max is a promiscuous man living in 1930s Berlin. He is at odds with his wealthy family because of his homosexuality.	United Kingdom, Japan	
1997	Best Men	Sergeant Buzz Thomas	Dean Cain	Thomas is a former soldier and a groomsman.	United States	
1997	Black Rose II	Dan	Blackie Ko	Dan is Chi-Mo's co-worker and a pre-operative male-to-female transsexual.	Hong Kong	
1997	Boogie Nights	Scotty J.	Philip Seymour Hoffman	Scotty is a boom operator who is in love with Dirk.	United States	
1997	Chasing Amy	Hooper	Dwight Ewell	Hooper is a black cartoonist, an African-American writer and activist who masks his flamboyantly personality with a militant image to promote his comic White-Hating Coon.	United States	
1997	The Fifth Element	Baby Ray	Ian Beckett	Baby Ray is a background character accompanied by a male significant.	United States	
1997	The Full Monty	Lomper	Steve Huison	Lomper is a security guard at the steel mill where Dave and Gaz once worked.	United Kingdom	
1997	The Full Monty	Guy	Hugo Speer	Lomper is a security guard at the steel mill where Dave and Gaz once worked.	United Kingdom	
1997	The Hanging Garden	William	Chris Leavins	Hinging on a fateful incident from William's teenage years, when his grandmother caught him attempting to have sex with his friend Fletcher, involuntarily outing him to his dysfunctional family.	United Kingdom, Canada	
1997	The Hanging Garden	Fletcher	Joel Keller	Hinging on a fateful incident from William's teenage years, when his grandmother caught him attempting to have sex with his friend Fletcher, involuntarily outing him to his dysfunctional family.	United Kingdom, Canada	
1997	Happy Together	Ho Po-Wing	Leslie Cheung	Ho Po-Wing and Lai Yiu-Fai are a couple from Hong Kong with a tumultuous relationship marked by frequent separations and reconciliations. They visit Argentina together but break up after they become lost while traveling to visit the Iguazu Falls.	British Hong Kong	
1997	Happy Together	Lai Yiu-Fai	Tony Leung Chiu-wai	Ho Po-Wing and Lai Yiu-Fai are a couple from Hong Kong with a tumultuous relationship marked by frequent separations and reconciliations. They visit Argentina together but break up after they become lost while traveling to visit the Iguazu Falls.	British Hong Kong	
1997	In & Out	Howard Brackett	Kevin Kline	Inspired by Tom Hanks's tearful speech when he accepted his 1994 Oscar (for his role in Philadelphia), in which he mentioned his high-school drama coach Rawley Farnsworth, and his former classmate John Gilkerson, "two of the finest gay Americans, two wonderful men that I had the good fortune to be associated with."	United States	
1997	In & Out	Peter Malloy	Tom Selleck	Inspired by Tom Hanks's tearful speech when he accepted his 1994 Oscar (for his role in Philadelphia), in which he mentioned his high-school drama coach Rawley Farnsworth, and his former classmate John Gilkerson, "two of the finest gay Americans, two wonderful men that I had the good fortune to be associated with."	United States	
1997	The Jackal	Douglas	Stephen Spinella	Douglas is a man who the Jackal encountered earlier in a bar and pretends to date with.	United States	
1997	Kiss Me, Guido	Warren	Anthony Barrile	Warren is an actor who's recently broken up with his director boyfriend.	United States	
1997	L.A. Confidential	Ellis Loew	Ron Rifkin	Ellis is a closeted District Attorney .	United States	
1997	Love! Valour! Compassion!	Gregory Mitchell	Stephen Bogardus	Revolving around eight gay men who gather for three summer weekends at a lakeside house in Dutchess County, New York, where they relax, reflect, and plan for survival in an era plagued by AIDS.	United States	
1997	Love! Valour! Compassion!	James Jeckyll	John Glover	Revolving around eight gay men who gather for three summer weekends at a lakeside house in Dutchess County, New York, where they relax, reflect, and plan for survival in an era plagued by AIDS.	United States	
1997	Love! Valour! Compassion!	Perry Sellars	Stephen Spinella	Revolving around eight gay men who gather for three summer weekends at a lakeside house in Dutchess County, New York, where they relax, reflect, and plan for survival in an era plagued by AIDS.	United States	
1997	Love! Valour! Compassion!	Buzz Hauser	Jason Alexander	Revolving around eight gay men who gather for three summer weekends at a lakeside house in Dutchess County, New York, where they relax, reflect, and plan for survival in an era plagued by AIDS.	United States	
1997	Love! Valour! Compassion!	Ramon Fornos	Randy Becker	Revolving around eight gay men who gather for three summer weekends at a lakeside house in Dutchess County, New York, where they relax, reflect, and plan for survival in an era plagued by AIDS.	United States	
1997	Love! Valour! Compassion!	Arthur Pape	John Benjamin Hickey	Revolving around eight gay men who gather for three summer weekends at a lakeside house in Dutchess County, New York, where they relax, reflect, and plan for survival in an era plagued by AIDS.	United States	
1997	Love! Valour! Compassion!	Bobby Brahms	Justin Kirk	Revolving around eight gay men who gather for three summer weekends at a lakeside house in Dutchess County, New York, where they relax, reflect, and plan for survival in an era plagued by AIDS.	United States	
1997	Midnight in the Garden of Good and Evil	Jim Williams	Kevin Spacey	Williams is an antiques dealer.	United States	
1997	My Best Friend's Wedding	George Downes	Rupert Everett	George is Julianne's friend and confidante. He agrees to pose as her fiancé so that she can make Michael, the college friend she thought would marry her, jealous.	United States	
1997	Nowhere	Cowboy	Guillermo Diaz	Cowboy and Bart are bandmates as well as boyfriends.	United States	
1997	Nowhere	Bart	Jeremy Jordan	Cowboy and Bart are bandmates as well as boyfriends.	United States	
1997	Spice World	Himself	Elton John	John, who is a world-renowned musician and a homosexual, has a role as himself in the film.	United Kingdom	
1997	Swept from the Sea	Dr. James Kennedy	Ian McKellen	Local doctor Dr. Kennedy's compassion towards Yanko marks the beginning of a devoted friendship.	United Kingdom, United States	
1997	'Til There Was You	Gregory	Ken Olin	Gregory is a college professor and an architect.	United States	
1997	Waiting for Guffman	Corky St. Clair	Christopher Guest	In the fictional small town of Blaine, Missouri, a few residents prepare to put on a community theater production led by eccentric director Corky St. Clair.	United States	
1997	Wilde	Oscar Wilde	Stephen Fry	Oscar loves his wife and children, but is sexually attracted to men. He becomes obsessed with Alfred. Alfred is Wilde's lover. Their relationship becomes a scandal resulting in Oscar's downfall.	United Kingdom	
1997	Wilde	Lord Alfred "Bosie" Douglas	Jude Law	Oscar loves his wife and children, but is sexually attracted to men. He becomes obsessed with Alfred. Alfred is Wilde's lover. Their relationship becomes a scandal resulting in Oscar's downfall.	United Kingdom	
1997	Wilde	John Gray	Ioan Gruffudd	Oscar loves his wife and children, but is sexually attracted to men. He becomes obsessed with Alfred. Alfred is Wilde's lover. Their relationship becomes a scandal resulting in Oscar's downfall.	United Kingdom	
1998	54	Steve Rubell	Mike Myers	Steve Rubell is co-owner of the New York City disco Studio 54.	United States	
1998	Alice and Martin	Benjamin	Mathieu Amalric	Martin's half-brother Benjamin is a struggling actor sharing living arrangements with his best friend Alice, a violinist in a local quintet that specializes in tango music.	France, Spain	
1998	B. Monkey	Paul Neville	Rupert Everett	Paul and Bruno are a couple and Beatrice's partners in crime.	United States, United Kingdom	
1998	B. Monkey	Bruno	Jonathan Rhys Meyers	Paul and Bruno are a couple and Beatrice's partners in crime.	United States, United Kingdom	
1998	Bedrooms and Hallways	Darren	Tom Hollander	Darren is a roommate of Leo's.	United Kingdom	
1998	Billy's Hollywood Screen Kiss	Billy Collier	Sean Hayes	Billy is a photographer who falls in love with sexually ambiguous waiter/model Gabriel. He hires Gabriel Perry is Billy's mentor, patron, and admirer. Fernando is Billy's on-again, off-again lover. He has an open relationship, but frequently pursues Billy.	United States	
1998	Billy's Hollywood Screen Kiss	Perry	Richard Ganoung	Billy is a photographer who falls in love with sexually ambiguous waiter/model Gabriel. He hires Gabriel Perry is Billy's mentor, patron, and admirer. Fernando is Billy's on-again, off-again lover. He has an open relationship, but frequently pursues Billy.	United States	
1998	Billy's Hollywood Screen Kiss	Fernando	Armando Valdes-Kennedy	Billy is a photographer who falls in love with sexually ambiguous waiter/model Gabriel. He hires Gabriel Perry is Billy's mentor, patron, and admirer. Fernando is Billy's on-again, off-again lover. He has an open relationship, but frequently pursues Billy.	United States	
1998	Bishonen	Jet	Stephen Fung	Jet is a handsome hustler whose sex appeal seems to know no bounds.	Hong Kong	
1998	Dark Harbor	Young Man	Norman Reedus	David and the young man are lovers.	United States	
1998	Das Trio	Karl	Christian Redl	Zobel and Karl are in a relationship.	Germany	
1998	Das Trio	Zobel	Götz George	Zobel and Karl are in a relationship.	Germany	
1998	Edge of Seventeen	Eric Hunter	Chris Stafford	In 1984 Sandusky, Ohio, Hunter is a Eurythmics-obsessed, musically driven teenager coming to terms with his sexual identity.	United States	
1998	Get Real	Steven Carter	Ben Silverstone	Centering the coming of age of a teen while growing up in rural Britain during the Cool Britannia era of the late 1990s.	United Kingdom	
1998	Get Real	John Dixon	Brad Gorton	Centering the coming of age of a teen while growing up in rural Britain during the Cool Britannia era of the late 1990s.	United Kingdom	
1998	Gods and Monsters	George Cukor	Martin Ferrero	Recounting the partly fictionalized last days of the life of film director James Whale.	United Kingdom, United States	
1998	Gods and Monsters	David Lewis	David Dukes	Recounting the partly fictionalized last days of the life of film director James Whale.	United Kingdom, United States	
1998	Gods and Monsters	James Whale	Ian McKellen	Recounting the partly fictionalized last days of the life of film director James Whale.	United Kingdom, United States	
1998	Head On	Ari	Alex Dimitriades	Retelling the story of Ari, a dissolute 19-year-old Greek-Australian drug addict living in St Kilda, Victoria.	Australia	
1998	Hold You Tight	A-che	Lawrence Ko	The story of a man living in Hong Kong who is initially drawn to a young woman, but soon finds he is more attracted to her boyfriend.	Hong Kong	
1998	Hold You Tight	Tong	Eric Tsang	The story of a man living in Hong Kong who is initially drawn to a young woman, but soon finds he is more attracted to her boyfriend.	Hong Kong	
1998	Illuminata	Umberto Bevalaqua	Christopher Walken	A flamboyant theater critic.	United States	
1998	The Impostors	Mr. Sparks	Billy Connolly	Sparks is an aging professional tennis player.	United States	
1998	The Object of My Affection	George Hanson	Paul Rudd	George is a first grade teacher.	United States	
1998	The Opposite of Sex	Bill Truitt	Martin Donovan	Bill is Dedee's much older half-brother and a teacher in a conservative, suburban community in Saint Joseph County, Indiana.	United States	
1998	The Opposite of Sex	Matt Mateo	Ivan Sergei	Bill is Dedee's much older half-brother and a teacher in a conservative, suburban community in Saint Joseph County, Indiana.	United States	
1998	The Velocity of Gary	Valentino	Vincent D'Onofrio	Valentino is a former porn star. Gary (not his real name, which is never revealed) is a hustler walking through the streets of New York City, looking for business.	United States	
1998	The Velocity of Gary	Gary	Thomas Jane	Valentino is a former porn star. Gary (not his real name, which is never revealed) is a hustler walking through the streets of New York City, looking for business.	United States	
1998	Velvet Goldmine	Arthur Stuart	Christian Bale	Arthur is a journalist who reflects on the formative role of glam rock in his life while working on a piece about bisexual glam rocker Brian Slade.	United States	
1999	Advice from a Caterpillar	Spaz	Andy Dick	Spaz is Missy's best friend.	United States	
1999	American Beauty	Jim Berkley	Sam Robards	Frank is closeted.	United States	
1999	American Beauty	Jim Olmeyer	Scott Bakula	Frank is closeted.	United States	
1999	American Beauty	Frank Fitts	Chris Cooper	Frank is closeted.	United States	
1999	Big Daddy	Phil D'Amato	Allen Covert	D'Amato and Grayton are lawyer friends of Sonny's who are also in a relationship.	United States	
1999	Big Daddy	Tommy Grayton	Peter Dante	D'Amato and Grayton are lawyer friends of Sonny's who are also in a relationship.	United States	
1999	The Big Tease	Crawford Mackenzie	Craig Ferguson	Mackenzie is a Scottish hairdresser who, while being filmed as part of a fly-on-the-wall BBC documentary, is invited to the World Hairdresser International Federation annual contest.	United States	
1999	Black and White	Terry Donager	Robert Downey Jr.	Terry is the closeted husband of a documentary filmmaker.	United States	
1999	Blast from the Past	Troy	Dave Foley	Troy is Eve's housemate and best friend.	United States	
1999	The Boondock Saints	Paul Smecker	Willem Dafoe	Smecker is an FBI agent who is assigned to the murders linked to the MacManus twin brothers.	United States	
1999	But I'm a Cheerleader	Dolph	Dante Basco	Dolph, Clayton, Andre, and Joel are campers. Rock is the son of Mary Brown, the founder of True Directions. Supposedly straight, he is actually closeted. Mike is supposedly an ex-gay who helps with the process of "curing" campers of their homosexuality; however, he is clearly shown to be still attracted to men. Lloyd and Larry are a couple described as "ex, ex-gays". Before the events of the film, they were once campers at True Directions before they defected. They help the campers sneak out and go party at a gay bar, and also give advice about dealing with one's own sexuality. They let ex-camper Dolph live with them when he is expelled from True Directions for having sex at the camp.	United States	
1999	But I'm a Cheerleader	Clayton Dunn	Kip Pardue		United States	
1999	But I'm a Cheerleader	Andre	Douglas Spain		United States	
1999	But I'm a Cheerleader	Joel Goldberg	Joel Michaely		United States	
1999	But I'm a Cheerleader	Rock Brown	Eddie Cibrian		United States	
1999	But I'm a Cheerleader	Mike	RuPaul		United States	
1999	But I'm a Cheerleader	Lloyd Morgan-Gordon	Wesley Mann		United States	
1999	But I'm a Cheerleader	Larry Morgan-Gordon	Richard Moll		United States	
1999	Cruel Intentions	Blaine Tuttle	Joshua Jackson	Tuttle is a friend of Sebastian who is struggling towards his relationship with a Football stud at his private school, Greg.	United States	
1999	East Is East	Nazir "Nigel" Khan	Ian Aspinall	Nigel is one the Khans' children.	United Kingdom	
1999	Go	Adam	Scott Wolf	Adam and Zack are soap opera actors who are in a relationship.	United States	
1999	Go	Zack	Jay Mohr	Adam and Zack are soap opera actors who are in a relationship.	United States	
1999	Happy, Texas	Sheriff Chappy Dent	William H. Macy	Dent is the sheriff of Happy, Texas.	United States	
1999	It's the Rage	Chris	David Schwimmer	Chris and Tim are a couple.	United States	
1999	It's the Rage	Tim	Andre Braugher	Chris and Tim are a couple.	United States	
1999	Magnolia	"Quiz Kid" Donnie Smith	William H. Macy	Former What Do Kids Know? champion Donnie Smith, whose parents took all his prize money, has been fired from his job due to performance issues and is in love with a male bartender with braces.	United States	
1999	Man of the Century	Tim	Anthony Rapp	Tim is a photographer.	United States	
1999	Second Skin	Diego	Javier Bardem	Diego is the handsome surgeon who Alberto has an affair with.	Spain	
1999	Summer of Sam	Bobby Del Fiore	Brian Tarantina	Del Fiore is a customer in the Italian-American neighborhood in the Bronx	United States	
1999	The Talented Mr. Ripley	Peter Smith-Kingsley	Jack Davenport	Peter is Ripley's lover later in the story.	United States	
1999	Three to Tango	Peter Steinberg	Oliver Platt	Steinberg has landed a career-making opportunity to design a multimillion-dollar cultural center for wealthy businessman Charles Newman along with Novak.	Australia, United States	
1999	Trick	Gabriel	Christian Campbell	Gabriel, an office temp by day and aspiring Broadway composer by night, makes eye contact with Mark, a go-go dancer at a gay bar. The two meet again in the subway the same night, and go back to Gabriel's place to have sex.	United States	
1999	Trick	Mark Miranda	John Paul Pitoc	Gabriel, an office temp by day and aspiring Broadway composer by night, makes eye contact with Mark, a go-go dancer at a gay bar. The two meet again in the subway the same night, and go back to Gabriel's place to have sex.	United States	
1999	The Underground Comedy Movie	Gay Man	Ant	Gay Virgin has repeatedly protested to a persistent would-be sex partner that he is saving himself for the right man.	United States	
1999	The Underground Comedy Movie	Gay Virgin	Michael Clarke Duncan	Gay Virgin has repeatedly protested to a persistent would-be sex partner that he is saving himself for the right man.	United States	

== See also ==
- List of films featuring gay bathhouses
- List of gay characters in television
- List of LGBT-related films
- List of LGBT-related films by year
