= The Men from the Boys =

Play written by Mart Crowley

- Paperback cover
- Original language: English
- Written by: Mart Crowley
- Characters: Hank; Michael; Bernard; Emory; Harold; Donald; Scott; Jason; Rick
- Genre: Drama

Premiere
- Date: 2002
- Place: San Francisco, California, U.S.

The Men From The Boys is a 2002 play by Mart Crowley, a sequel to his notable 1968 play The Boys in the Band. Set in a New York City apartment, the plot features friends gathering after a friend's memorial service.

== Plot ==
Characters introduced 35 years previously during The Boys in the Band are reunited. The group is brought back together at the funeral of Larry, who died of pancreatic cancer. They revisit the same apartment in Manhattan as the first play, and again begin talking and arguing. The dialog and story is relayed in "real time". New characters include Scott, a younger man dating Michael, who is poorly received by the group. Michael angrily defends Scott, and yells at the new character Jason, a "strident young activist" who had been romantically involved with Larry. Emory and Harold get involved in the arguments, while non-combative characters include Donald, Bernard, and Rick, a male nurse who had been harboring feelings for Larry. In the play, three of the characters have joined Alcoholics Anonymous.

== Creation ==
The play was written by Mart Crowley, famous for writing The Boys in the Band, which was groundbreaking for its frank portrayal of gay perspectives and lives in a repressive time, prior to the cultural acceptance of gay rights later in the 1960s. Crowley stated that he had always declined recommendations to write a sequel, until he felt enough time passed where he knew what had likely happened to the characters. It was his first play since Avec Schmaltz in 1984. The original score was composed by Larry Grossman, known for A Doll's Life.

== Productions ==
Its world premiere was on October 26, 2002 at San Francisco's New Conservatory Theater Center, under artistic direction by Ed Decker. It was billed as a "sequel play." Opening officially for review on November 9, 2002, it was presented in two acts with a running time of two hours and twenty minutes. Rick Sinkkonen and Sarah Ellen Joynt handled set. It ran until December 8.

== Main cast ==
- Russ Duffy as Michael
- Olen Christian Holm as Scott, a "pretty boy" dating Michael
- Owen Thomas as Jason, a young activist
- Michael Patrick Gaffney as Emory
- Will Huddleston as Harold
- Peter Carlstrom as Donald, the group's remaining alcoholic
- Lewis Sims as Bernard
- Andrew Nance as Larry, a schoolteacher
- Terry Lamb as Hank
- Rajiv Shah as Rick, a young nurse

== Reception ==
Variety noted the "lack of significant change" in the characters' demeanor as one of several major problems in the play; wondering why Michael, Harold, Emory, and the other characters had remained friends despite their years of backstabbing. The reviewer complained the characters seemed to have "resisted 35 years of social potential personal change," remaining single, "predatory", and ill-suited for long-term relationships. The critic perceived characters as "authorial mouthpieces" for outdated and racist sentiments; the production was further criticized for its staging and "ill-conceived" apartment set. Duffy was noted the best actor, with Michael portrayed as "poisonous yet occasionally poignant".

== External reviews ==
- Curtainup.com
