= Robert La Tourneaux =

American actor (1940–1986)

- La Tourneaux in After Dark magazine, 1969
- Born: Robert Earl LaTurno; November 22, 1941; St. Louis, Missouri, US
- Died: June 3, 1986 (aged 44); New York, New York U.S.
- Occupation: Actor
- Years active: 1960s–1983

From the original film window card for The Boys in the Band, 1970

Robert La Tourneaux (November 22, 1941 – June 3, 1986) was an American actor best known for his role of Cowboy, the good-natured but dim hustler hired as a birthday present for a gay man, in the original Off-Broadway production and 1970 film version of The Boys in the Band.

== Biography ==
Robert Earl LaTurno was born in St. Louis, Missouri, to James and Lucille LaTurno on November 22, 1941. He made his Broadway theatre debut in the 1967 musical Illya Darling while simultaneously playing the role of Mike Powers in the NBC soap opera The Doctors. In 1968, he was part of the ensemble for Mart Crowley's play The Boys in the Band, which opened on April 14, 1968, at Theater Four in New York City. The advertisement for the film version used head shots of Leonard Frey and La Tourneaux, with La Tourneaux identified as the "present" for Frey's birthday-celebrating character. Many newspapers refused to run the advertisement.

After the film version of The Boys in the Band was released La Tourneaux's career declined. His only other film performances were a supporting part in the Roger Corman film Von Richthofen and Brown (1971) and the independent film Pilgrimage. He also had a small role in a 1974 made-for-television version of the Maxim Gorky play Enemies.

On stage, La Tourneaux appeared in a small role in a Broadway revival of The Merchant of Venice; he was slated to appear in the 1977 Broadway production of Tennessee Williams' Vieux Carré, but was dropped from the cast prior to the show's opening.

The openly gay La Tourneaux initially blamed his being typecast as a gay hustler for his inability to receive worthwhile roles, stating in a 1973 interview, "Boys was the kiss of death for me." In the 1978 anthology Quentin Crisp's Book of Quotations, La Tourneaux compared his career to another gay actor by saying, "Charles Laughton played every kind of part, but never a homosexual. People knew he was gay, but his public image [which included a wife] never betrayed his public reality. So he was safe. I wasn't safe."

Unable to secure work as an actor, La Tourneaux began nude modeling in gay men's magazines and in 1978 performed nude in a one-man cabaret act at the Ramrod, a New York City theater showing gay pornography films. He eventually became a prostitute.

La Tourneaux also gave an interview to a gay magazine naming his famous married closeted bisexual lovers, alleging one of them to have been Academy Award-winning actor Christopher Walken. He also accused Walken of having an affair with another married actor, Robert Wagner, on the night of actress Natalie Wood's (Wagner's wife) unexplained death.

In 1983, La Tourneaux was arrested for assault after trying to extort money from a client and was incarcerated at the Rikers Island prison. While in prison, La Torneaux attempted suicide.

In the early 1980s, La Tourneaux developed HIV/AIDS, and received news coverage when he sought legal channels to prevent being evicted from his apartment when his landlord objected to the presence of his live-in caregiver. La Tourneaux won the court case, but died in Metropolitan Hospital on June 3, 1986. Boys co-star Cliff Gorman and his wife cared for him during his illness and until his death. He was buried at Rosedale and Rosehill Cemetery in Linden, New Jersey.

== Work ==
- Love of Life (1951, TV series) - Jimmy Stanhope (1965–66)
- The Doctors (1963, TV series) - Mike Powers (1967)
- Illya Darling (1967 Broadway production)
- The Boys in the Band (1968 play) - Cowboy Tex
- The Boys in the Band (1970, film) - Cowboy Tex
- Von Richthofen and Brown (1971, film) - Ernest Udet
- Pilgrimage (1972, film) - Peter
- The Merchant of Venice (1973 Broadway production)
- Enemies (1974, TV film) - Officer (final television appearance)
