= Reuben Greene =

American actor (born 1938)

- Born: November 24, 1938; Philadelphia, Pennsylvania, U.S.
- Occupation: Actor

Reuben Greene (born November 24, 1938) was an American film, theater and television actor. He is perhaps best known for originating the role of Bernard in the play The Boys in the Band and then later playing the same character in the 1970 film of the same name.

An African-American, Greene mostly worked as an actor in theater, and sometimes in commercials. Besides Boys in the Band, his only film and television credits are the role of Dr. James Hudson on the 1969 CBS soap opera Where the Heart Is and a short role as Franklyn in the 1976 Elaine May film Mikey and Nicky.

In a 1996 interview, The New York Daily News reported that Greene was living in Queens, New York. His last known interview was with the Windy City Times around 2000, in which he stated that he was not gay, despite his involvement in The Boys in the Band. In 2010, filmmaker Crayton Robey screened his making-of The Boys In the Band documentary Making the Boys at the Tribeca Film Festival. Robey stated in an interview with The Washington Blade that Greene's whereabouts were unknown.

== Sources ==
- Reuben Greene at IMDb
- Reuben Greene at Rotten Tomatoes
