= Peter White (actor) =

American actor (1937–2023)

- Born: October 10, 1937; New York City, New York, U.S.
- Died: November 1, 2023 (aged 86); Los Angeles, California, U.S.
- Occupation: Actor

Peter White (October 10, 1937 – November 1, 2023) was an American actor.

== Early life and education ==
Peter White was born in New York City on October 10, 1937. He studied acting at the Yale School of Drama.

== Career ==
In 1968, White received critical acclaim for his role as Alan McCarthy in off-Broadway's The Boys in the Band. White, and the rest of the original cast, appeared in the 1970 film version, directed by William Friedkin. He was touring in Barefoot in the Park with Myrna Loy when he was offered the part in Mart Crowley's controversial play about a group of gay friends in New York. He told Soap Opera Digest: "Things were sort of really moving for me; I was doing so well, and I thought, 'I don't need this kind of risk.' I talked to Myrna — she became my mentor — and she said, 'Peter, if you are going to be an actor, you are going to have to take some risks in your life.'"

White played Director of Central Intelligence John A. McCone in the film Thirteen Days.

In the 1970s, he began a 30-year stint playing the role of Phoebe Tyler's son, Lincoln 'Linc' Tyler, on the daytime soap opera All My Children, and in the 1980s appeared on nighttime soap operas including Dallas, Knots Landing and Falcon Crest. Among White's many television credits are appearances on The Feather and Father Gang, Ally McBeal, Hart to Hart, The West Wing, The Colbys and a recurring co-starring role as Dr. Thomas Reed on the television series Sisters.

In 2010, White appeared in filmmaker Crayton Robey's making-of The Boys in the Band documentary, Making the Boys.

== Death ==
White died of melanoma in Los Angeles, on November 1, 2023, at the age of 86.

== Filmography ==
=== Film ===
Year	Title	Role	Notes
1970	The Boys in the Band	Alan McCarthy	
1971	The Pursuit of Happiness	Terence Lawrence	
1973	Blade	Freund	
1991	Diary of a Hitman	Man in Garage	
1993	Dave	Secretary of Commerce	
1996	Mr. Wrong	Mr. Alston	
1996	Mother	Charles	
1997	Flubber	Mr. Sylvan	Uncredited
1998	Armageddon	Secretary of Defense	
1999	Passport to Paris	Grandpa Edward	
2000	Thirteen Days	John A. McCone	
2004	First Daughter	College Dean	
2007	South of Pico	Mr. Rush	
2016	Punching Henry	Phil	

=== Television ===
Year	Title	Role	Notes
1968	N.Y.P.D.	Russell	Episode: "The Peep Freak"
1970	The Bold Ones: The Senator	Howard Eager	Episode: "Power Play"
1971	Dan August	Jeremy Jackson	Episode: "Bullet for a Hero"
1971	Love Is a Many Splendored Thing	Dr. Sanford Hiller	258 episodes
1972	Banyon	Ross Vincent	Episode: "The Decent Thing to Do"
1973	Cannon	Dirk Allwin	Episode: "Dead Lady's Tears"
1974–2005	All My Children	Lincoln Tyler	Main role
1977	The Feather & Father Gang	Steve	Episode: "The Big Frame"
1981	Hill Street Blues	Minister	Episode: "Fecund Hand Rose"
1981	The Greatest American Hero	Yuri Semenenko / Simpson	Episode: "Reseda Rose"
1982	Between Two Brothers	Alex Brock	Television film
1982	Eleanor, First Lady of the World	James Roosevelt	Television film
1982	Falcon Crest	Eric Kenderson	2 episodes
1982	The Jeffersons	Gregory Graham	Episode: "Poetic Justice"
1982	Gavilan	Campbell	Episode: "Best Friend Money Can Buy"
1982	Insight	Mr. Gold	Episode: "The White Star Garage"
1983	Hart to Hart	Customs Inspector Camden	Episode: "Pounding Harts"
1983	I Want to Live	Judge Charles Fricke	Television film
1983	Boone	Dr. Brickman	Episode: "The Trial"
1983, 1984	Dynasty	Bill Rockwell	2 episodes
1984	Legmen	Allen Drewry	Episode: "Knight at Casanova's"
1984	Knots Landing	Pearson	2 episodes
1984	Sins of the Past	Peter Halloran	Television film
1984	Simon & Simon	Chef Sebastian / Neil Loosma	2 episodes
1984	Hardcastle and McCormick	Senator Evan Crocker	Episode: "Never My Love"
1984–1991	Dallas	Breslin / Ellis Newton	6 episodes
1985	The Execution	Gil Spahn	Television film
1985	Cover Up	Mark Jessup	Episode: "Rules to Die By"
1985	The Paper Chase	Paul Woods	3 episodes
1985	Crazy Like a Fox	Russ Cramer	Episode: "Murder Is a Two Stroke Penalty"
1985	Scarecrow and Mrs. King	Darrell Robison	Episode: "Sour Grapes"
1985–1986	The Colbys	Arthur Cates	16 episodes
1986	Matlock	Atty. Harvey Ravanelle	Episode: "Diary of a Perfect Murder"
1988	L.A. Law	Stanley Silverman	Episode: "Open Heart Perjury"
1988	Superboy	Professor Thomas Lang	Episode: "The Jewel of Techacal"
1988	The Law & Harry McGraw	Sidney Reigns	Episode: "Harry Does the Hustle"
1988	Amen	Mr. Lesser	Episode: "Get 'Em Up, Scout"
1988	Designing Women	Newscaster	Episode: "The Candidate"
1989	Hooperman	Stark	Episode: "Look Homeward, Dirtbag"
1989	Who's the Boss?	Donald Crenshaw	Episode: "Party Double"
1990	Daughter of the Streets	Herb	Television film
1990	Monsters	Donald Graber / Dave Panghurst	2 episodes
1991	The New Lassie	Garrett	Episode: "Hit and Run"
1991–1996	Sisters	Dr. Thomas Reed	14 episodes
1992	Pros and Cons	Terrence Morgan	Episode: "The Ex Spots the Mark"
1992	Life Goes On	Kenny Stollmark, Sr.	2 episodes
1994	Star Trek: Deep Space Nine	Ambassador Sharat	Episode: "Armageddon Game"
1994	Voices from Within	Frank Carson	Television film
1995	The Naked Truth	Mr. Hillerman	Episode: "Bald Star in Hot Oil Fest!"
1995	Murder, She Wrote	Mason Logan	Episode: "Unwilling Witness"
1997	Weapons of Mass Distraction	Sen. Norman Barrish	Television film
1997	Mad About You	Judge Chuffa	Episode: "Uncle Phil and the Coupons"
1998	Profiler	Charles Waters	2 episodes
1999	Ally McBeal	Senator Harold Watkins	Episode: "Sex, Lies and Politics"
1999	The X-Files	Gene Gogolak	Episode: "Arcadia"
2000	The West Wing	Mr. Gage	2 episodes
2000	JAG	Admiral Spencer	Episode: "A Separate Peace: Part 2"
2001, 2003	Strong Medicine	Dr. Soames	2 episodes
2002	NYPD Blue	Robert Irvin	2 episodes
2003	Miracles	Monsignor Androtti	Episode: "The Ferguson Syndrome"
2004	The D.A.	Dr. Jon Malcolm	Episode: "The People vs. Oliver C. Handley"
2005	See Arnold Run	Bob White	Television film
2006	Though None Go with Me	Ben Phillips	Television film
2007	Cold Case	JP Valentine	Episode: "Devil Music"
2008	Saving Grace	Mr. Williams	Episode: "Have a Seat, Earl"
