= Keith Prentice =

American actor

- Born: February 21, 1940; Dayton, Ohio, U.S.
- Died: September 27, 1992 (aged 52); Kettering, Ohio, U.S.
- Occupation(s): Stage, film, television actor
- Years active: 1959–1992

Keith Prentice (February 21, 1940 – September 27, 1992) was an American TV, film and stage actor, whose most famous role was the part of Larry in both the original stage and film version of The Boys in the Band. He also appeared on the TV soap opera Dark Shadows during the series' final months in 1971. For a number of years, his picture was displayed on the Taster's Choice coffee label.

Prentice studied in New York City at the American Academy of Dramatic Arts. His stage musical credits include Sail Away, The Sound of Music, Paint Your Wagon, and The King and I. In 1968, he appeared off-Broadway in the play The Boys in the Band, a once controversial play featuring gay characters at a dramatic birthday party the summer before the Stonewall riots. He also appeared in the 1970 film version of the play.

In 1971, Prentice joined the cast of Dark Shadows playing Morgan Collins in the show's 1841 plot with parallel time. He also appeared as Nils Fowler in the 1972 film The Legend of Nigger Charley and had a small role in the 1980 film Cruising which, like The Boys in the Band, was directed by William Friedkin.

In 1982, Prentice co-founded Kettering Theatre Under the Stars in Kettering, Ohio, and directed summer shows there until he died of AIDS-related cancer on September 27, 1992.

== Filmography ==
Year	Title	Role	Notes
1970	The Boys in the Band	Larry	
1980	Cruising	Joey	
