= The Boys in the Band (play) =

Play by Mart Crowley

- One of early theatrical release posters
- Original language: English
- Written by: Mart Crowley
- Characters: Hank; Alan; Bernard; Cowboy; Michael; Harold; Emory; Donald; Larry
- Genre: Drama
- Setting: Manhattan

Premiere
- Date: April 15, 1968
- Place: Theatre Four, 424 West 55th Street, Manhattan, New York City

The Boys in the Band is a 1968 American play by Mart Crowley. The play premiered Off-Broadway, and was revived on Broadway for its 50th anniversary in 2018. The play revolves around a group of gay men who gather for a birthday party in New York City, and was groundbreaking for its portrayal of gay life. It was adapted into two feature films in 1970 and 2020.

A sequel, The Men from the Boys, premiered in 2002.

== Synopsis ==
The play is set in an apartment on the Upper East Side of Manhattan, "a smartly appointed duplex apartment in the East Fifties", and the backgrounds of characters are revealed in the course of a birthday party.

- Harold celebrates his birthday. In the character's own words an "ugly, pock-marked Jew fairy", he becomes increasingly morose about losing his youthful looks and claims that he no longer can attract cute young men. In the dramatis personae, he is described as being "dark" with an "unusual Semitic face".
- "Cowboy", an attractive blond hustler who is "not too bright" and "too pretty", is one of Harold's birthday presents.
- Alan McCarthy, Michael's married college friend and roommate, is an unexpected party guest. He is visiting New York and anxious to tell Michael something, but hesitant to do so in front of the others. It is suggested that he once had homosexual affairs while in college, but his sexual orientation is never explicitly stated, leaving it to audience interpretation. The dramatis personae describes him as "aristocratic" and "Anglo-Saxon".

The party is given by Harold's six closest friends:

- Michael is Harold's "smartly groomed" "frenemy", the host, and a lapsed Catholic as well as an alcoholic. He is the catalyst for most of the drama of the play.
- Donald is Michael's ex-boyfriend, current friend (though the exact nature of their relationship is ambiguous) who has moved from the city to the Hamptons to spurn the homosexual "lifestyle", and is undergoing psychoanalysis. He has "wholesome American good looks".
- Bernard is an African-American librarian who still pines for the wealthy white boy in whose house his mother worked as a maid. In the dramatis personae, he is "Twenty-eight, Negro, nice-looking".
- Emory is a flamboyant and effeminate interior decorator. He is often campy in his sense of humor, which serves to irritate others.
- Larry is a commercial artist who prefers multiple sex partners and is "extremely handsome".
- Hank is Larry's live-in boyfriend who has been married to a woman from whom he is separated and is divorcing. He "passes" as straight and disagrees with Larry on the issue of monogamy. Physically, he is described as "solid, athletic, attractive".

During the party, the humor takes a nasty turn, as the nine men become increasingly inebriated. The party culminates in a "game", where each man must call someone whom he has loved and tell them about it. Michael, believing that Alan has finally "outed" himself when he makes his call, grabs the phone from him and discovers Alan has called his wife. The audience never learns what Alan intended to discuss with Michael in the end.

== Title and creation ==
The Boys in the Band was written by American playwright Mart Crowley. In 1957, Crowley started working for a number of television production companies, before meeting Natalie Wood on the set of her film Splendor in the Grass while working as a production assistant. Wood hired him as her assistant, primarily to give him ample free time to work on his gay-themed play. Wood, Crowley's close friend, inspired him to move from New York to Hollywood. According to Crowley's friend Gavin Lambert, Wood sympathized with Hollywood's gay scene, and financially supported Crowley so he would be free to write his play. Crowley worked as an assistant for Wood and her husband Robert Wagner for many years.

After several Hollywood film productions he was helping on were canceled, his wealthy friend Diana Lynn hired him to housesit. He lived in the Hollywood Georgian mansion where he only had to "throw dinner parties and drink myself into oblivion." He began writing instead of drinking, and began working on The Boys in the Band.

Crowley told Dominick Dunne about the title: "It's that line in A Star Is Born when James Mason tells a distraught Judy Garland 'You're singing for yourself and the boys in the band.'"

According to Crowley, his motivation in writing the play was not activism, but anger that "had partially to do with myself and my career, but it also had to do with the social attitude of people around me, and the laws of the day". He says he "wanted the injustice of it all — to all those characters — known". Crowley has also stated, "I was not an activist, then or now. I didn't know what hit me. I just wrote the truth."

Crowley made no secret that all characters were based on real people in his life, with Michael reminding him of himself, describing the character as "a complex person who is aware of what is politically correct but has a sort of contempt for it". He called Donald "a foil for Michael" and inspired by a droll friend he would periodically take wry comments from. In the 1995 documentary The Celluloid Closet, Crowley explained, "The self-deprecating humor was born out of a low self-esteem, from a sense of what the times told you about yourself." In The Boys in the Band: Something Personal, a short documentary accompanying Netflix's release of the 2020 film adaptation, Crowley clarified that Donald was based on Douglas Murray, to whom the play was dedicated. Harold, the character whose birthday was being celebrated, is a cipher for dancer/choreographer Howard Jeffrey, who died in 1988 of AIDS, to whom the play was also dedicated. Crowley took one of the key lines of the play, "I try to show a little affection; it keeps me from feeling like such a whore", from a hustler he danced with on Fire Island, telling, "I couldn't write anything that good!".

== Production history ==
=== Off-Broadway premiere, 1968 ===
While Crowley was pitching the script, early agents stayed away from the project, and it was championed by playwright Edward Albee and Richard Barr, who at the time was head of the Playwrights Units in New York. For the production, it proved "nearly impossible to find" actors willing to play gay characters. An old college friend of Crowley's, 33-year-old Laurence Luckinbill, agreed to play Hank despite warnings from his agent that it would end his career, even though the agent was herself a lesbian. It proved hard for Crowley to find producers and theater owners who were interested.

The play premiered Off-Broadway on April 14, 1968, at Theater Four, and closed on September 6, 1970, after 1,001 performances. Directed by Robert Moore, the cast included Kenneth Nelson as Michael, Peter White as Alan McCarthy, Leonard Frey as Harold, Cliff Gorman as Emory, Frederick Combs as Donald, Laurence Luckinbill as Hank, Keith Prentice as Larry, Robert La Tourneaux as Cowboy, and Reuben Greene as Bernard. The play was one of the early works to present a story centered on homosexuals. In 1968, although only originally scheduled to run for five performances at a small venue off Broadway, it was a fast success and was moved to a larger theater. It went on to have a run in London as well. The premiere's actors such as Laurence Luckinbill drilled a hole in the set so they could spy on whoever was in the house's best seats, and in the initial weeks, saw Jackie Kennedy, Marlene Dietrich, Groucho Marx, Rudolf Nureyev, and New York mayor John Lindsay. Despite the success of the play, all the gay members of the original company stayed in the closet after the premiere. Between 1984 and 1993, five of the gay men in the original production (as well as director Robert Moore and producer Richard Barr) died in the ensuing AIDS epidemic.

=== Off-Broadway and London revivals ===
The play was revived Off-Broadway at the Lucille Lortel Theatre in 1996, running from August 6 to October 20, after its initial sold-out run at the WPA Theater. The Boys in the Band was presented by the Transport Group Theater Company, New York City, from February 2010 to March 14, 2010, directed by Jack Cummings III.

A London staging in October 2016 at Park Theatre was the first revival there in two decades. It subsequently transferred to the Vaudeville Theatre in the West End. Positively reviewed, including in The Observer, the production starred Mark Gatiss as Harold and Ian Hallard as Michael, with Daniel Boys, Jack Derges, James Holmes, John Hopkins, Greg Lockett, Ben Mansfield, and Nathan Nolan. The production was nominated for four awards in the 2017 WhatsOnStage Awards: Best Play Revival and Best Off-West End Production, with Hallard nominated as Best Actor in a Play and Jack Weir for Best Lighting Design.

=== Broadway production, 2018 ===
A Broadway production of The Boys in the Band, directed by Joe Mantello, opened in previews at the Booth Theatre on April 30, 2018, officially on May 31, and ran until August 11, 2018. This production, staged for the 50th anniversary of the play's original premiere, starred Matt Bomer, Jim Parsons, Zachary Quinto and Andrew Rannells, as well as Charlie Carver, Brian Hutchison, Michael Benjamin Washington, Robin de Jesús, and Tuc Watkins. Quinto portrayed Harold, whose birthday sets the premise. All of the actors who were in the 2018 production are out gay actors.

This production won the 2019 Tony Award for Best Revival of a Play, and Robin de Jesús was nominated for the Tony Award for Best Featured Actor in a Play.

== Reception and impact ==
When The Boys in the Band premiered in 1968, mainstream audiences were shocked. The play was profiled in the William Goldman book The Season: A Candid Look at Broadway, an account of the 1967–1968 season. In the same year, a two-disc, vinyl LP set was released, containing the full dialogue of the play voiced by the original actors. Crowley wrote the 2002 sequel The Men from the Boys.

In 2002, Peter Filichia from Theater Mania contended that the play's original production helped inspire the 1969 Stonewall riots and gay rights movement.

After gays saw The Boys in the Band, they no longer would settle for thinking of themselves as pathetic and wouldn't be perceived as such any longer. Now that [characters] had brought their feelings out of the closet, this new generation would dare to be different. And, just as some whites' view of blacks changed after seeing A Raisin in the Sun, so too did the outlook of many straights after they caught The Boys in the Band. Some whom I personally know felt terrible and–I saw this happen!–actually changed the way they treated gays.

In 2004, David Anthony Fox from Philadelphia City Paper praised this play, its one-liners, and its live performance in Philadelphia. He rebutted criticism that the play portrayed "urban gay men as narcissistic, bitter, shallow".

In 2010, Elyse Summer in her review for CurtainUp called it a "smart gimmick" full of dated "self-homophobic, low self-esteem characters". In the same year, Steve Weinstein from the Edge website called it "Shakespearean".

== Awards and nominations ==
Year	Award	Category	Nominee	Result	Ref.
1968	Obie Award	Distinguished Performance by an Actor (8 awarded)	Cliff Gorman	Won	
1997	Obie Award	Distinguished Performance (11 awarded)	David Greenspan	Won	
2017	WhatsOnStage Awards	Best Play Revival	The Boys in the Band	Nominated	
2017	WhatsOnStage Awards	Best Off West End Production	The Boys in the Band	Nominated	
2017	WhatsOnStage Awards	Best Actor in a Play	Ian Hallard	Nominated	
2019	Broadway.com Audience Awards	Favorite Featured Actor in a Play	Matt Bomer	Nominated	
2019	Broadway.com Audience Awards	Favorite Breakthrough Performance (Male)	Charlie Carver	Nominated	
2019	Tony Awards	Best Revival of a Play	The Boys in the Band	Won	
2019	Tony Awards	Best Featured Actor in a Play	Robin de Jesús	Nominated	

== Sequel ==
In 2002, Crowley wrote The Men from the Boys, a sequel to the play, which takes place 30 years after the original. It premiered in San Francisco in 2002, directed by Ed Decker, and was produced in Los Angeles in 2003.

== Film adaptations ==
The play was adapted into a feature film by Cinema Center Films in 1970, directed by William Friedkin.

Ryan Murphy produced a second film adaptation for Netflix with the 2018 Broadway revival cast and Joe Mantello directing.

== See also ==
- LGBT culture in New York City
- List of LGBTQ people from New York City
