= Frederick Combs =

American actor

- Born: George Frederick Combs, Jr. October 11, 1935; Portsmouth, Virginia, United States
- Died: September 19, 1992 (aged 56); Los Angeles, California, United States
- Occupations: Actor, playwright, director

Frederick Combs (October 11, 1935 – September 19, 1992) was an American film, theater and television actor, playwright and director.

Combs is best known for originating the role of Donald in the play The Boys in the Band and then later in the 1970 film of the same name.

He performed extensively in theater including Franco Zeffirelli's 1963 production of The Lady of the Camellias. He also appeared on Broadway as Geoffrey in Shelagh Delaney's play A Taste of Honey in 1960, alongside Joan Plowright and Billy Dee Williams, produced by David Merrick. and toured with the show starring Hermione Baddeley through 1961.

He died in Los Angeles in 1992 of an AIDS-related illness at the age of 56.

== Filmography ==
- The Defenders (1961)
- The Wild Wild West
- The Boys in the Band (1970)
- The Users
- Roots: The Next Generations
- David (1988)
