= The Boys in the Band (1970 film) =

1970 film by William Friedkin

- Theatrical release poster
- Directed by: William Friedkin
- Screenplay by: Mart Crowley
- Based on: The Boys in the Band (1968 play) by Mart Crowley
- Produced by: Mart Crowley
- Starring: Kenneth Nelson; Leonard Frey; Cliff Gorman; Laurence Luckinbill; Frederick Combs; Keith Prentice; Robert La Tourneaux; Reuben Greene; Peter White
- Cinematography: Arthur J. Ornitz
- Edited by: Gerald B. Greenberg; Carl Lerner
- Production companies: Cinema Center Films; Leo Productions
- Distributed by: National General Pictures
- Release date: March 18, 1970
- Running time: 120 minutes
- Country: United States
- Language: English
- Budget: $5.5 million
- Box office: $3.5 million (US/Canada rentals)

The Boys in the Band is a 1970 American drama film directed by William Friedkin from a screenplay by Mart Crowley (who also produced), based on Crowley's 1968 play. The ensemble cast, all of whom also played the roles in the play's initial Off-Broadway run, includes Kenneth Nelson, Peter White, Leonard Frey, Cliff Gorman, Frederick Combs, Laurence Luckinbill, Keith Prentice, Robert La Tourneaux, and Reuben Greene.

The film is among the early major American motion pictures to revolve around gay characters, often cited as a milestone in the history of gay cinema, and thought to be the first mainstream American film to use the swear word "cunt". It was released in the United States by National General Pictures on March 18, 1970.

== Plot ==
In a Manhattan Upper East Side apartment in 1968, Michael, a Roman Catholic, recovering alcoholic and sporadically employed actor, hosts a birthday party for his friend, Harold. Michael's best friend, Donald, arriving early because of a cancelled psychotherapy session, helps Michael prepare. When Donald observes that Michael has not been drinking alcohol the past five weeks, Michael says he quit drinking and smoking because his bad habits leave him in a vicious cycle. Alan, Michael's former college roommate, calls with an urgent need to see Michael. Reluctantly, Michael invites him over.

One by one, the guests arrive. Emory is an interior designer. Hank, a soon-to-be-divorced schoolteacher, and Larry, a fashion photographer, are a couple whose relationship is on the rocks, struggling with monogamy. Bernard is a bookstore clerk. "Cowboy", a hustler and Emory's birthday "gift" to Harold, arrives. Warning his guests that he has never come out to Alan, who is an uptight, straight conservative, Michael asks for discretion in their behavior.

Despite Alan's calling again to inform Michael that he will not be coming after all, Alan then arrives unexpectedly, finding Michael and his friends line dancing to “Heat Wave”. Alan's arrival throws the gathering into turmoil. Alan relates to Hank, whom he mistakes as being straight, but shows discomfort toward Emory's flamboyant behavior. Michael takes Alan to his bedroom to discuss Alan's urgent conversation, but Alan dodges his questions.

As tensions mount, Alan announces to the group that he is leaving. Emory chides him for being attracted to Hank, which results in Alan's punching Emory and calling him a "faggot". During the ensuing chaos, Harold makes his appearance. Michael begins drinking and smoking again, turning aggressive. As the guests become increasingly intoxicated, hidden resentments surface.

While Hank helps a vomiting Alan in the bathroom, Michael and Harold trade insults over Harold's obsessive insecurity about his appearance and Michael's financial irresponsibility. Emory brings out Harold's birthday cake and presents. Emory's present is an evening with Cowboy, a prostitute. From Michael, he receives a photo of Michael, with an inscription that Harold chooses to keep private when asked what it says. Touched, Harold thanks Michael for the gift.

Alan tries to leave again but is stopped by Michael, who asserts that Alan would have already left if he truly wanted to. Michael informs everyone that they are playing a party game with the objective that each guest call the one person he truly has loved, scoring points based on the degree of contact and disclosure. Harold and Donald decisively refuse to play. Bernard reluctantly attempts to call the son of his mother's employer, with whom he had had a sexual encounter as a teenager, leaving an innocuous message. Emory calls a dentist on whom he had had a high school crush, whose tone is distant. Both regret the phone calls. After bickering over Hank's doubt that serially unfaithful Larry will choose him, Hank and Larry call each other via two phone lines in the apartment, reaffirming their commitment.

Michael believes Alan is a closeted homosexual. Their third college roommate, Justin, had informed Michael that he had three sexual encounters with Alan, who terminated their friendship after Justin declared his love for Alan. Alan insists Justin's lies are revenge for being rejected. Michael coerces Alan to call Justin to apologize for his callousness. Michael's plan to "out" Alan with the game backfires when Alan calls his wife, reconciling with her, instead of Justin.

Declaring himself as the only one who can beat Michael at his games, Harold informs Michael that he will always be a self-loathing homosexual. Harold departs, taking Cowboy and his presents, but pauses to tell Michael, "I'll call you tomorrow." Emory leaves with a distraught Bernard, promising to sober him up on the way home.

Collapsing and sobbing in Donald's arms, Michael wishes, "If we could just not hate ourselves so much." Donald comforts Michael, saying his despair is awareness he might work on to improve his life. Donald asks what Alan wanted to confide in him, but Michael responds that Alan never said why he had left his wife. Michael leaves to attend midnight Mass with the assurance that he will be seeing Donald next Saturday.

== Cast ==
Credits from the AFI Catalog of Feature Films:

- Kenneth Nelson as Michael
- Leonard Frey as Harold
- Cliff Gorman as Emory
- Laurence Luckinbill as Hank
- Frederick Combs as Donald
- Keith Prentice as Larry
- Robert La Tourneaux as Cowboy Tex
- Reuben Greene as Bernard
- Peter White as Alan McCarthy

Additionally, model/actress Maud Adams has a brief cameo appearance in the opening montage, as does restaurateur Elaine Kaufman.

== Production ==
=== Development ===
The play was popular and several studios and stars were interested in making in a movie version. Crowley insisted on being involved as a writer and producer and to have creative control. Crowley and his friend and colleague, writer Dominick Dunne (inspiration for the character of Alan McCarthy) set up the film version of the play with the newly formed Cinema Center Films (CCF), owned by CBS Television.

Crowley was paid $250,000 plus a percentage of the profits for the film rights; in addition to this, he received a fee for writing the script. Dunne would be executive producer along with Robert Jiras, while Crowley was producer. CCF made the film in part to offset the impression that the studio was only interested in making movies suitable for television. CCF's head of production Gordon Stulberg acknowledged that Boys in the Band would not likely screen on television. "I think we've dispelled the television image," said Stulberg. "We are part of the new philosophy of filmmaking." Stulberg undertook to keep the dialogue from the play in the movie version.

Crowley and Dunne originally wanted the play's director, Robert Moore, to direct the film but Gordon Stulberg was reluctant to entrust the job to someone who had never made a movie before. They decided on William Friedkin, who had just made a film of The Birthday Party by Harold Pinter that impressed them.

=== Filming ===
Friedkin rehearsed for two weeks with the cast. He shot a scene that was offstage in the play where Hank and Larry kiss passionately. The actors who played them were reluctant to perform this on film, but eventually they did. However, Friedkin cut the scene during editing, feeling it was over-sensationalistic; nevertheless, he later admitted regretting that decision.

Filming started June 1969 and went until August. The bar scene in the opening was filmed at Julius in Greenwich Village. Studio shots were at the Chelsea Studios in New York City.

According to the commentary by Friedkin on the 2008 DVD release, Michael's apartment was inspired by the real-life Upper East Side apartment of actress Tammy Grimes. (Grimes was a personal friend of Mart Crowley.) Most of the patio scenes were filmed at Grimes' home. The actual apartment was recreated on a sound stage, and that is where the interior scenes were filmed.

Friedkin fired the cinematographer Adam Holender one week into the shoot, replacing him with Arthur J. Ornitz. Crowley said he got along with Friedkin during the film for the most part but said "Billy really didn't have the sense of humour that Robert Moore did on the stage."

Songs featured in the film include "Anything Goes" performed by Harpers Bizarre during the opening credits, "Good Lovin' Ain't Easy to Come By" by Marvin Gaye and Tammi Terrell, "Funky Broadway" by Wilson Pickett, "(Love Is Like A) Heat Wave" by Martha and the Vandellas, and an instrumental version of Burt Bacharach's "The Look of Love".

== Reception ==
=== Box office ===
Gordon Stulberg admitted the film was a financial failure. "It did well in the big cities but the heartland of America simply would not accept a film about homosexuality, even though it had no outright sex," said Stulberg.

=== Critical response ===
As per the review aggregator website Rotten Tomatoes, 90% of critics have given the film a positive review based on 20 reviews, with an average rating of 7.20 out of 10. On Metacritic, the film has a weighted average score of 65 out of 100 based on 14 critics, indicating "generally favorable reviews".

Contemporary critical reaction was, for the most part, cautiously favorable. Variety wrote that it "drags" and "few would be able to recommend it as a really good film" but thought it had "perverse interest".

Time described it as a "humane, moving picture". The Los Angeles Times praised it as "unquestionably a milestone" but refused to run its ads. Among the major critics, Pauline Kael, who disliked Friedkin, was alone in finding absolutely nothing redeeming about it. Kael wrote: "A gathering of homosexuals at a birthday party; it's like the gathering of bitchy ladies in The Women, but with a 40s-movie bomber-crew cast: a Catholic, a Jew, a Negro, a hustler, one who is butch, and one who is nellie, and so on. They crack jokes while their hearts are breaking."

Vito Russo, activist and film historian, examined the film in The Celluloid Closet: "The film presents a perfunctory compendium of easily acceptable stereotypes who gather at a Manhattan birthday party and spend an evening savaging each other and their way of life ... Yet in spite of itself, Crowley’s passion play was part catharsis and part catalyst. His characters were losers or borderline survivors at best, but they paved the way for winners ... The film was not positive, but it was fair ... If nothing else, The Boys in the Band illuminated the fear and ignorance that surrounded homosexuality in America. And while it was considered the pinnacle of Hollywood’s commitment to the exploration of such “adult” themes, it was in fact a freak show." Film historian and writer Richard Barrios explored its complexity: "Here are collected all the imposing paradoxes history can offer. By being unnervingly real at the same time that it is rackingly phony, The Boys in the Band makes of itself both a rapturous high and a dirty shame. It exalts with its affection and intimate truths and stunning insights and crashes and burns with pessimism and blame and falsehood. Where homosexuals and homosexuality on film is concerned, this is The Birth of a Nation ... Why did this movie grab so many people, then? ... After all these years, why does it still matter? ... Crowley knew himself and his sector of gay life well enough to capture it with some truth, and truth often luxuriates in its own permanence."

Leslie Halliwell, British film critic, wrote, "Careful but claustrophobic filming of a Broadway play, which at the screen's closer quarters becomes overpowering well before the end." Leonard Maltin gave the film three and a half of four stars: "Excellent filmization of Mart Crowley's landmark play about nine men at a birthday party: eight are gay, the ninth insists he's not. Often hilarious, frequently sad, but always thought provoking, and sensationally acted by the original stage cast; a rare case where a single claustrophobic set is actually an asset."

Vincent Canby of The New York Times observed "Except for an inevitable monotony that comes from the use of so many close-ups in a confined space, Friedkin's direction is clean and direct, and, under the circumstances, effective. All of the performances are good, and that of Leonard Frey, as Harold, is much better than good. He's excellent without disturbing the ensemble...Crowley has a good, minor talent for comedy-of-insult, and for creating enough interest, by way of small character revelations, to maintain minimum suspense. There is something basically unpleasant, however, about a play that seems to have been created in an inspiration of love-hate and that finally does nothing more than exploit its (I assume) sincerely conceived stereotypes."

=== Retrospective appraisal ===
In a San Francisco Chronicle review of a 1999 revival of the film, Edward Guthmann recalled "By the time Boys was released in 1970...it had already earned among gays the stain of Uncle Tomism." He called it "a genuine period piece but one that still has the power to sting. In one sense it's aged surprisingly little — the language and physical gestures of camp are largely the same — but in the attitudes of its characters, and their self-lacerating vision of themselves, it belongs to another time. And that's a good thing."

Bill Weber from Slant wrote in 2015: "The partygoers are caught in the tragedy of the pre-liberation closet, a more crippling and unforgiving one than the closets that remain."

The film was perceived in different ways throughout the gay community. There were those who agreed with most critics and believed The Boys in the Band was making great strides while others thought it portrayed a group of gay men wallowing in self-pity. There were even those who felt discouraged by some of the honesty in the production. One spectator wrote in 2018: "I was horrified by the depiction of the life that might befall me. I have very strong feelings about that play. It's done a lot of harm to gay people."

While not as acclaimed or commercially successful as director Friedkin's subsequent films, Friedkin considered this film to be one of his favorites. He remarked in an interview on the 2008 DVD for the movie: "It's one of the few films I've made that I can still watch."

Cinema Center Films made several contemporary dramas and it has been argued that The Boys in the Band was the only one to have any sort of cultural impact.

=== Accolades ===
Kenneth Nelson was nominated for the Golden Globe Award for New Star of the Year – Actor. The Producers Guild of America Laurel Awards honored Cliff Gorman and Leonard Frey as Stars of Tomorrow.

== Home media ==
The Boys in the Band was released by MGM/CBS Home Video on VHS videocassette in October 1980, and was later re-released on CBS/Fox Video. It was later released on laserdisc.

The DVD, overseen by Friedkin, was released by Paramount Home Entertainment on November 11, 2008. Additional material includes an audio commentary; interviews with director Friedkin, playwright/screenwriter Crowley, executive producer Dominick Dunne, writer Tony Kushner, and two of the surviving cast members, Peter White and Laurence Luckinbill; and a retrospective look at both the off Broadway 1968 play and 1970 film.

On June 16, 2015, it was released on Blu-ray via Kino Lorber. On May 22, 2026, it was release for the first time on 4K UHD via the Vinegar Syndrome sub-label, Cinématographe.

The 2011 documentary Making the Boys explores the production of the play and film in the context of its era.

== Remakes ==
Ryan Murphy produced a new film version of The Boys in the Band for Netflix in 2020. Joe Mantello, director of the play's 2018 Broadway revival, served as director of the new film version, which featured the entire Broadway revival cast, including Jim Parsons as Michael, Zachary Quinto as Harold, Matt Bomer as Donald, and Charlie Carver as Cowboy. The film was released by Netflix on September 30, 2020.

A Thai remake was made in 1987, directed by M.L. Pundhevanop Dhewakul. The film was screened at the Bangkok International Film Festival in 2022.

== See also ==
- Boys in the Sand – a gay porn feature film released in 1971
- The Boys in the Band – 1968 play
- LGBT culture in New York City
- List of American films of 1970
- List of LGBTQ people from New York City

== Notes ==
- Clagett, Thomas D. (1990). William Friedkin : films of aberration, obsession, and reality. McFarland.
