= Leonard Frey =

American actor (1938–1988)

- Born: September 4, 1938; New York City, U.S.
- Died: August 24, 1988 (aged 49); New York City, U.S.
- Education: Neighborhood Playhouse School of the Theatre
- Occupation: Actor
- Years active: 1959–1988

Leonard Frey (September 4, 1938 – August 24, 1988) was an American actor. Frey received a nomination for the Academy Award for Best Supporting Actor for his role in the 1971 musical film Fiddler on the Roof. He made his stage debut in an Off-Broadway production of Little Mary Sunshine and received a nomination for the Tony Award for Best Featured Actor in a Play for The National Health.

== Life and career ==
Frey was born in Brooklyn, New York, to a Jewish family. After attending James Madison High School, he studied art at Cooper Union, with designs on becoming a painter, then switched to acting at New York City's Neighborhood Playhouse under acting coach Sanford Meisner, and pursued a career in theater.

Frey received critical acclaim in 1968 for his performance as Harold in off-Broadway's The Boys in the Band. He appeared with the rest of the original cast in the 1970 film version, directed by William Friedkin.

Frey was nominated for a 1975 Tony Award as Best Featured Actor in a Play for his performance in The National Health. Other stage credits included revivals of The Time of Your Life (1969), Beggar on Horseback (1970), Twelfth Night (1972) and The Man Who Came to Dinner (1980). He also played Clare Quilty in the Alan Jay Lerner musical Lolita, My Love which closed, before reaching Broadway, in 1971.

Frey was nominated for the Academy Award for Best Supporting Actor for his performance as Motel the tailor in Norman Jewison's 1971 film Fiddler on the Roof (he had appeared in the original Broadway musical production as Mendel, the rabbi's son). Other film credits included roles in The Magic Christian (1969), Tell Me That You Love Me, Junie Moon (1970), Where the Buffalo Roam (1980), Up the Academy (1980), and Tattoo (1981).

Frey's television credits included appearances on Hallmark Hall of Fame; Medical Center; Mission Impossible; Eight Is Enough; Quincy, M.E.; Hart to Hart; Barney Miller (1975 episode: 'The Escape Artist' & 1980 episode: 'Vanished', part 2); Moonlighting; Murder, She Wrote; and the miniseries Testimony of Two Men, as well as a co-starring role as the villainous Parker Tillman on the short-lived ABC western comedy Best of the West, and Raymond Holyoke on Mr. Smith, which ran for 13 episodes on NBC in fall 1983. He also appeared as a panelist on the game shows Match Game-Hollywood Squares Hour, Body Language and Super Password.

On The Mary Tyler Moore Show episode titled "Ted Baxter's Famous Broadcaster's School," airing February 22, 1975, Frey played the role of “The Student.” Frey's final role was Walter Witherspoon in the television movie Bride of Boogedy.

== Death ==
Frey, who was gay, died at age 49 from HIV related sickness in New York on August 24, 1988, 11 days before his 50th birthday.

== Filmography ==
Year	Title	Role	Notes
1963	The Fat Black Pussycat		
1966	Passages from James Joyce's Finnegans Wake	Celebrant	
1969	The Magic Christian	Laurence Faggot	
1970	The Boys in the Band	Harold	
1970	Tell Me That You Love Me, Junie Moon	Guiles	
1971	Fiddler on the Roof	Motel	
1980	Where the Buffalo Roam	Desk Clerk	
1980	Up the Academy	Keck	
1981	Tattoo	Halsey	
1982	The Sound of Murder		

== Awards and nominations ==
Year	Award	Category	Nominated work	Result	Ref.
1971	Academy Awards	Best Supporting Actor	Fiddler on the Roof	Nominated	
1970	Laurel Awards	Star of Tomorrow – Male	The Boys in the Band	4th Place	
1975	Tony Awards	Best Supporting or Featured Actor in a Play	The National Health	Nominated	
