= Anything Goes (Harpers Bizarre album) =

Studio album by Harpers Bizarre
- Released: December 1967
- Genre: Orchestral pop; soft rock
- Length: 37:43
- Label: Warner Bros.
- Producer: Lenny Waronker

Harpers Bizarre chronology
Feelin' Groovy (1967)	Anything Goes (1967)	The Secret Life of Harpers Bizarre (1968)

Professional ratings
Review scores
Source	Rating
Allmusic	2/5 stars

Anything Goes is the second studio album by Harpers Bizarre, released in 1967.

Two bonus tracks were added to the 2001 CD issue of this title: the 45 version of "Cotton Candy Sandman" by Kenny Rankin, and the theme to the TV series Malibu U by Don and Dick Addrisi.

The title track was used in the opening montage of the 1970 film The Boys in the Band.

Two singles charted in Billboard: Anything Goes peaked at #43 and Chattanooga Choo Choo at #45 on the Hot 100 Singles chart. The album climbed to #76 on the Top 200 Albums chart.

== Track listing ==
Side one

1. "(Intro) This Is Only the Beginning" (Ted Koehler, Harold Arlen)
2. "Anything Goes" (Cole Porter)
3. "Two Little Babes in the Wood" (Porter)
4. "The Biggest Night of Her Life" (Randy Newman)
5. "Pocketful of Miracles" (Sammy Cahn, Jimmy Van Heusen)
6. "Snow" (Newman)
7. "Chattanooga Choo Choo" (Mack Gordon, Harry Warren)

Side two

1. "Hey You in the Crowd" (Dick Scoppettone, Ted Templeman)
2. "Louisiana Man" (Doug Kershaw)
3. "Milord" (Georges Moustaki, Marguerite Monnot)
4. "Virginia City" (Scoppettone, Templeman)
5. "Jessie" (Mike Gordon, Jimmy Griffin)
6. "You Need a Change" (David Blue)
7. "High Coin" (Van Dyke Parks)
