= Those Were the Days (Johnny Mathis album) =

Studio album by Johnny Mathis
- Released: November 6, 1968
- Recorded: July–October, 1968
- Genres: Vocal; pop/rock
- Length: 32:34
- Label: Columbia
- Producer: Robert Mersey

Johnny Mathis chronology
Love Is Blue (1968)	Those Were the Days (1968)	People (1969)

Professional ratings
Review scores
Source	Rating
The Encyclopedia of Popular Music	3/5 stars

Those Were the Days is an album by American pop singer Johnny Mathis that was released on November 6, 1968, by Columbia Records. It followed the formula of including covers of recent hit songs, the oldest, in this case, being "The End of the World", which hadn't been on the charts since 1963. Two of the 10 tracks, however, had not been released as singles by other artists: "Every Time I Dream of You", which had appeared as an instrumental on Bert Kaempfert's 1967 album Love That Bert Kaempfert, and "You Make Me Think About You", which was first heard in the 1968 film With Six You Get Eggroll.

The Mathis recording of "You Make Me Think About You" debuted on Billboard magazine's list of the 40 most popular Easy Listening songs in the US in the issue dated October 12, 1968, and reached number 35 during its four weeks there. The first appearance of the album on the magazine's Top LPs came two months later in the December 14 issue that began a 21-week run, during which time it peaked at number 60. In the meantime it also enjoyed four weeks on the Best Selling Rhythm & Blues LPs chart, where it got as high as number 48.^{[A]} In March 1969 the cover of "The 59th Street Bridge Song (Feelin' Groovy)" spent its two weeks on the Easy Listening chart at number 39.

Those Were the Days was released for the first time on compact disc on June 9, 2009, as one of two albums on one CD, the second of the two being the follow-up by Mathis, Love Theme from "Romeo And Juliet" (A Time for Us). Those Were the Days was also included in Legacy's Mathis box set The Voice of Romance: The Columbia Original Album Collection, which was released on December 8, 2017.

== Track listing ==
=== Side one ===
1. "Those Were the Days" (Gene Raskin) – 3:59
2. "Little Green Apples" (Bobby Russell) – 3:38
3. "The End of the World" (Arthur Kent, Sylvia Dee) – 3:10
4. "This Guy's In Love With You" (Hal David, Burt Bacharach) – 4:37
5. "The 59th Street Bridge Song (Feelin' Groovy)" (Paul Simon) – 2:10

=== Side two ===
1. "Light My Fire" (Jim Morrison, John Densmore, Ray Manzarek, Robby Krieger) – 3:48
2. "Every Time I Dream of You" (Richard Ahlert, Bert Kaempfert, Herbert Rehbein) – 3:53
3. "The World I Used to Know" (Rod McKuen) – 2:30
4. "You Make Me Think About You" from With Six You Get Eggroll (Bob Hilliard, Robert Mersey) – 1:59
5. "Turn Around Look at Me" (Jerry Capehart) – 2:50

=== 2017 CD bonus tracks ===
This album's CD release as part of the 2017 box set The Voice of Romance: The Columbia Original Album Collection included two bonus tracks that were previously unavailable:

- "Gentle on My Mind" (John Hartford) – 2:44
- "Like to Get to Know You" (Stuart Scharf) – 2:33

== Recording dates ==
From the liner notes for The Voice of Romance: The Columbia Original Album Collection:

- July 5, 1968 – "Every Time I Dream of You"
- July 9, 1968 – "The 59th Street Bridge Song (Feelin' Groovy)"
- July 10, 1968 – "Gentle on My Mind", "Like to Get to Know You", "This Guy's In Love With You"
- July 22, 1968 – "Turn Around Look at Me", "The World I Used to Know", "You Make Me Think About You"
- August 20, 1968 – "The End of the World"
- October 4, 1968 – "Light My Fire", "Little Green Apples", "Those Were the Days"

== Personnel ==
- Johnny Mathis – vocals
- Robert Mersey – arranger and conductor (except where noted), producer
- D'Arneill Pershing – arranger and conductor ("This Guy's In Love With You", "The 59th Street Bridge Song (Feelin' Groovy)")
- Rafael O. Valentin – engineer
- Frank Bez – photography

== Notes ==
^{A} Joel Whitburn's Top R&B Albums, 1965–1998 lists this album as having peaked on the Best Selling Rhythm & Blues LPs chart at number two for two weeks out of the four that it spent there. The four corresponding weekly issues of Billboard, which is their source for this information, however, indicate that it only made it to number 48.

== Bibliography ==
- Whitburn, Joel (1999), Joel Whitburn's Top R&B Albums, 1965–1998, Record Research Inc., ISBN 0898201349
- Whitburn, Joel (2007), Joel Whitburn Presents Billboard Top Adult Songs, 1961–2006, Record Research Inc., ISBN 0898201691
- Whitburn, Joel (2010), Joel Whitburn Presents Top Pop Albums, Seventh Edition, Record Research Inc., ISBN 0-89820-183-7
