= The 59th Street Bridge Song (Feelin' Groovy) =

1966 single by Simon & Garfunkel

- 1971 European single, where "The 59th Street Bridge Song" was given the A-side

Single by Simon & Garfunkel

from the album Parsley, Sage, Rosemary and Thyme
- A-side: "At the Zoo"
- Recorded: August 16, 1966
- Genre: Folk rock
- Length: 1:43 (original version); 1:53 (later fade out)
- Label: Columbia
- Songwriter: Paul Simon
- Producer: Bob Johnston

Simon & Garfunkel singles chronology
"El Cóndor Pasa (If I Could)" (1970)	"The 59th Street Bridge Song (Feelin' Groovy)" (1967)	"For Emily, Whenever I May Find Her (Live)" (1972)

Music video
- "The 59th Street Bridge Song (Feelin' Groovy)" on YouTube

"The 59th Street Bridge Song (Feelin' Groovy)" is a song by folk rock duo Simon & Garfunkel, written by Paul Simon and originally released on their 1966 album Parsley, Sage, Rosemary and Thyme. Although it became the B-side of one of their singles and did not chart for them, other artists had success with it, most notably Harpers Bizarre.

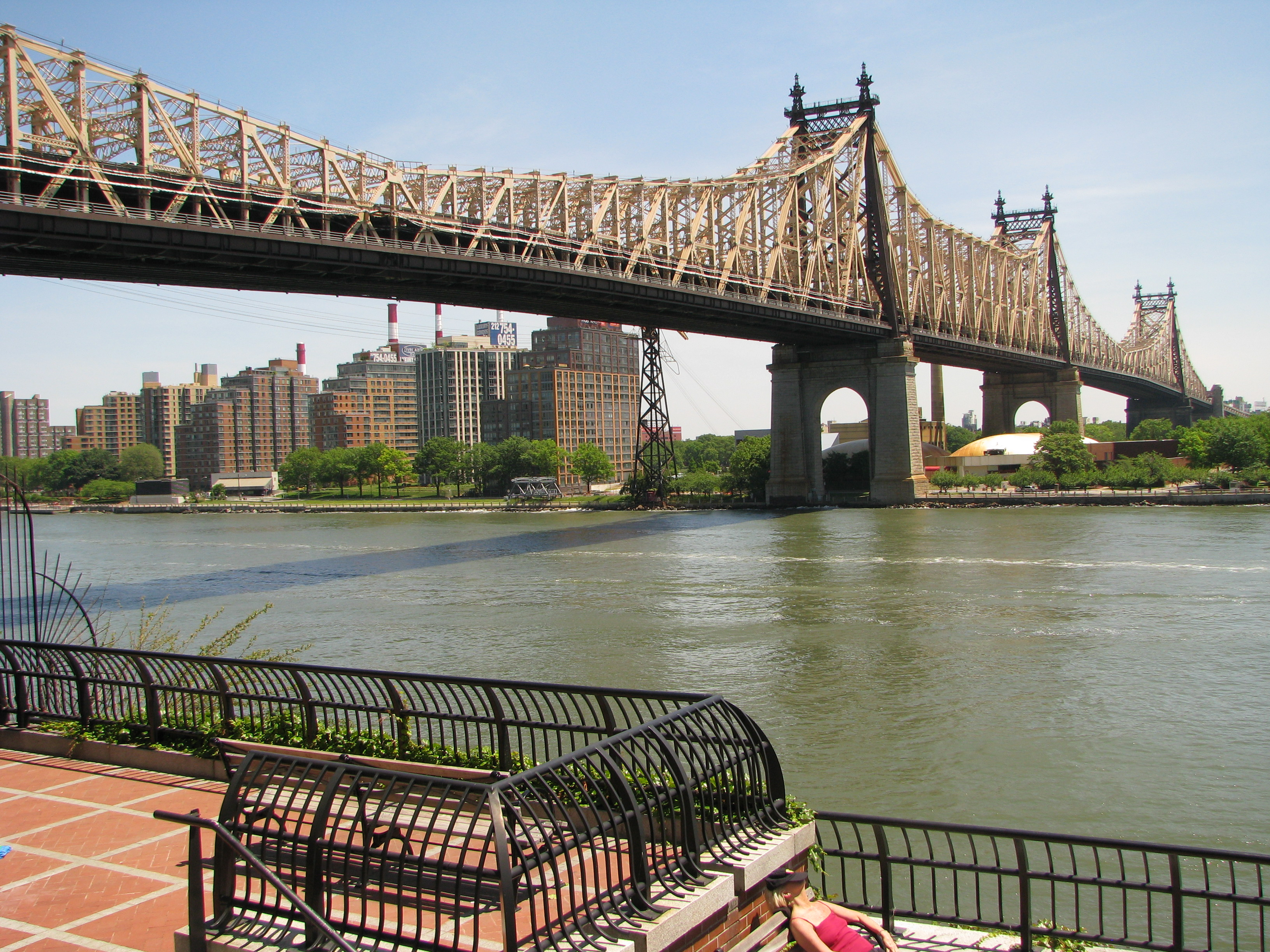
59th Street Bridge, seen from Manhattan, in 2010

== Origin and composition ==
The song is named for the Queensboro Bridge, which spans the East River between the New York City boroughs of Manhattan and Queens, 59th Street Bridge being a popular unofficial alternate name for that landmark whose Manhattan end is located between 59th and 60th Streets. Reportedly the song came to Paul Simon during a daybreak walk across the Queensboro Bridge: the line: "Just kicking down the cobblestones" refers to the paving at the approach to the bridge's Queens end, while "Hello lamppost, what'cha knowing" refers to either of two bronze lampposts which stood at the bridge's Manhattan end; although the northern member of the pair was removed circa 1975, the southern lamppost is still in place.

Simon opted to entitle the song after its site of inspiration rather than its prominent hook line "feelin' groovy", balking at labeling one of his songs with such a lowbrow turn of phrase; however, "The 59th Street Bridge Song" would be tracklisted on the Parsley, Sage, Rosemary and Thyme album with "Feelin' Groovy" as its parenthetical subtitle.

Simon would say of the song's brevity: "Sometimes I make a song purely an impression...When you've made your impression, stop. I don't want the [listener] to think [beyond] its [being] a happy song."

== Simon and Garfunkel version ==
=== Recording and releases ===
"The 59th Street Bridge Song" was recorded for the Parsley, Sage, Rosemary and Thyme album on August 16, 1966, and features Dave Brubeck Quartet members Joe Morello (drums) and Eugene Wright (double bass).

The track would serve as B-side for their 1967 Top 20 hit "At the Zoo". The running time of the song on the single and on Parsley, Sage, Rosemary and Thyme was 1:43. Subsequent remasters, included on later reissues of the album and such compilations as Old Friends, Tales from New York: The Very Best of Simon & Garfunkel, and The Essential Simon & Garfunkel, have a longer fade-out, extending the song length to 1:53.

=== Critical reception ===
In reviewing both sides of the "At the Zoo" single, Cash Box magazine called "The 59th Street Bridge Song" a "sparkling, spirited lid". In a retrospective review for AllMusic, Bruce Eder described it as one of "the most beautiful songs ever written about the simple joys of living".

=== Live performances ===
Footage of Simon and Garfunkel performing the song at the 1967 Monterey Pop Festival is featured in the film Monterey Pop. In his review of the film for dvdjournal.com, Mark Bourne wrote, "Simon, a member of the Festival's board of directors, had wanted 'The Sound of Silence' to represent the duo in the film, but [its director D. A.] Pennebaker felt that 'Feelin' Groovy' better fit his ideal of the more playful pop music sound."

During his 2018 farewell tour, Simon "penalized" himself for wrongly performing the lyrics to another song by singing this song, which he confesses to hating.

"The 59th Street Bridge Song (Feelin' Groovy)"

Single by Harpers Bizarre

from the album Feelin' Groovy
- B-side: "Lost My Love Today"
- Released: 1967
- Recorded: November 25, 1966
- Studio: Western Recorders
- Genre: Pop
- Length: 2:34
- Label: Warner Bros.
- Songwriter: Paul Simon
- Producer: Lenny Waronker

Harpers Bizarre singles chronology
"The 59th Street Bridge Song (Feelin' Groovy)" (1967)	"Come to the Sunshine" (1967)

Music video
- "The 59th Street Bridge Song (Feelin' Groovy)" on YouTube

== Harpers Bizarre version ==
Harpers Bizarre recorded the song at Western Recorders on November 25, 1966, for their 1967 album Feelin' Groovy. The track was produced by Lenny Waronker. It includes an a cappella choral section.

=== Chart performance ===
The Harpers Bizarre recording debuted on the Billboard Hot 100 in the issue of the magazine dated February 18, 1967, and peaked at number 13 during its eleven weeks there. On the magazine's Easy Listening chart, it got as high as number 4 over the course of thirteen weeks. It reached number 6 in Canada, and number 34 in the UK.

=== Critical reception ===
In their review column, the editors of Cash Box magazine gave the recording a letter grade of A. They wrote, "Perky, shuffling ballad about a walk in the city should be heard throughout the airwaves." In a retrospective review of the Feelin' Groovy album, Matthew Greenwald of AllMusic noted that their version boasted "an amazing Leon Russell arrangement and some great performances from the A-list of L.A. session cats". Stewart Mason of AllMusic wrote that their version was "buffed to a lollipop shine". AllMusic's Fred Thomas reviewed the group's Come to the Sunshine compilation in 2021 and wrote, "Layered vocal harmonies and chamber pop instrumentation gave the band's version of the song a unique appeal", and that it was "reworked under the heavy influence of the Beach Boys' 'Good Vibrations'."

=== Charts ===
Weekly chart performance for "The 59th Street Bridge Song (Feelin' Groovy)" by Harpers Bizarre
Chart (1967)	Peak position
Canada RPM Top Singles	6
UK Singles (Official Charts)	34
US Billboard Hot 100 (Billboard)	13
US Billboard Easy Listening	4

"The 59th Street Bridge Song (Feelin' Groovy)"

Single by Johnny Mathis

from the album Those Were the Days
- B-side: "The End of the World"
- Released: December 11, 1968
- Recorded: July 9, 1968
- Genre: Pop
- Length: 2:10
- Label: Columbia
- Songwriter: Paul Simon
- Producer: Robert Mersey

Johnny Mathis singles chronology
"You Make Me Think About You" (1968)	"The 59th Street Bridge Song (Feelin' Groovy)" (1968)	"I'll Never Fall in Love Again" (1969)

Music video
- "The 59th Street Bridge Song (Feelin' Groovy)" on YouTube

== Johnny Mathis version ==
Johnny Mathis recorded the song on July 9, 1968, with an orchestra conducted by D'Arneill Pershing. It was produced by Robert Mersey and released as a single five months later, on December 11. It was also included on his album Those Were the Days, which was released on November 6.

=== Chart performance ===
The Mathis recording debuted on Billboard magazine's Easy Listening chart in the issue dated March 1, 1969, and got as high as number 39 during its two weeks there.

=== Charts ===
Weekly chart performance for "The 59th Street Bridge Song (Feelin' Groovy)" by Johnny Mathis
Chart (1968)	Peak position
US Billboard Easy Listening	39

"Feelin' Groovy"

Single by Southwest F.O.B.

from the album Smell of Incense
- B-side: "Beggar Man"
- Released: 1969
- Recorded: October 1968
- Studio: Brians Recording Studio, Tyler, Texas
- Genre: Pop
- Length: 2:52
- Label: Hip
- Songwriter: Paul Simon
- Producer: Norm Miller

Southwest F.O.B. singles chronology
"As I Look at You" (1969)	"Feelin' Groovy" (1969)

== Southwest F.O.B. version ==
Southwest F.O.B. recorded the song in October 1968 for their album Smell of Incense. The song (with its title shortened to "Feelin' Groovy") was produced by Norm Miller and recorded at Brians Recording Studio in Tyler, Texas. It was released in 1969 as the fourth single from the album.

=== Chart performance ===
"Feelin' Groovy" peaked at number 115 on Billboard magazine's Bubbling Under Hot 100 Singles chart during its two weeks there that began in the January 17, 1970, issue.

=== Critical reception ===
In their review column, the editors of Cash Box magazine wrote, "The 'Smell of Incense' gang weights Paul Simon's '59th St. Bridge Song' with an arrangement and performance that could stir interest on top forty and MOR levels." The editors of Record World described the recording as "a really fine treatment".

=== Charts ===
Weekly chart performance for "Feelin' Groovy" by Southwest F.O.B.
Chart (1970)	Peak position
US Billboard Bubbling Under the Hot 100	115

== Covers ==
AllMusic editors highlighted various versions in retrospective reviews of the albums on which they appear, such as the one on 1967's Kites Are Fun by the Free Design. Bruce Eder described it as "highly ornate". Reviews of three albums from 1968 mentioned renditions. Eder thought that Jackie Trent's recording on Live for Love was "pleasant enough in its middlebrow way". Greg Adams was not enthusiastic about the one on For the First Time, an album by Pete Fountain and Brenda Lee. He wrote, "The album mixes pop and jazz standards with contemporary pop songs like 'The 59th Street Bridge Song' …, but the jazz-oriented numbers have a more timeless appeal." William Ruhlmann described the duet between Mabel Mercer and Bobby Short on their live album At Town Hall as "playful". Matthew Greenwald explained that on 1969's The Live Adventures of Mike Bloomfield and Al Kooper there was "a great, revamped rock/soul re-working of Paul Simon's 'Feelin' Groovy', which is buttressed by a guest studio vocal overdub by the author himself". Richie Unterberger thought there was "an unnecessary, pedestrian heavy rock cover" on Cochise's self-titled 1970 album. Regarding jazz saxophonist Paul Desmond's 1969 album Bridge Over Troubled Water, Richard S. Ginell wrote that the song "is given a jaunty, carefree rendition, adapting quite well to a jazz treatment". Eder reviewed the Treasure Chest box set by the Seekers in 1997 and described their rendition as "lugubrious".

== In popular culture ==
- Liberace and the Youngfolk Singing Aggregation performed the song on the March 5, 1968, episode of The Red Skelton Hour. Pittsburgh Press TV critic Joan Crosby described the performance as "spritely".
- The song was the basis of the Grateful Dead's "Dark Star" jam on the Dick's Picks Volume 4 album from February 13, 1970, at the Fillmore East in New York City. In his book Grateful Dead and the Art of Rock Improvisation, David Malvinni explains that Simon's upbeat lyrics "contrast sharply with the disaster inherent in the 'Dark Star' text. Thus, both music and lyrics of 'Feelin' Groovy' provide a perfect foil to the burgeoning heaviness of 'Dark Star'."
- The song was used in 2017 in the season 3 premiere of The Leftovers called "The Book of Kevin". Protagonist Kevin Garvey asphyxiates himself with plastic wrap and duct tape in his room as the song plays. Spin's Winston Cook-Wilson wrote that one of the writers of the episode, series creator Damon Lindelof, chose the song for that scene "just to be an asshole".

== Lawsuit ==
The theme song to the American children's television program H.R. Pufnstuf, originally credited to Sid and Marty Krofft, was found to closely mimic "The 59th Street Bridge Song" after Simon sued for plagiarism; his writing credit was subsequently added to the theme for the show.

== Bibliography ==
- Carlin, Peter Ames (2016), Homeward Bound: The Life of Paul Simon, Henry Holt and Co., ISBN 978-1-627-79034-5
- Malvinni, David (February 28, 2013), Grateful Dead and the Art of Rock Improvisation, Scarecrow Press, ISBN 978-0-8108-8348-2
- Whitburn, Joel (2007), Joel Whitburn Presents Billboard Top Adult Songs, 1961–2006, Record Research, ISBN 978-0898201697
- Whitburn, Joel (2009), Joel Whitburn's Top Pop Singles, 1955–2008, Record Research, ISBN 978-0898201802
