= Stulberg =

Stulberg is a surname. Notable people with the surname include:

- Gordon Stulberg (1923–2000), Canadian-American film executive and lawyer
- Louis Stulberg (1901–1977), American trade unionist
