= Feelin' Groovy =

Studio album by Harpers Bizarre
- Released: April 1967
- Genre: Soft rock; soft pop
- Length: 23:46
- Label: Warner Bros.
- Producer: Tom Donohue, Abe Kesh, Bob Mitchell, Lenny Waronker

Harpers Bizarre chronology
Feelin' Groovy (1967)	Anything Goes (1967)

Professional ratings
Review scores
Source	Rating
Allmusic	4/5 stars

Feelin' Groovy is the debut album by the American sunshine pop band Harpers Bizarre, released in 1967.

The record peaked at #108 on Billboard's Top 200 Albums chart in May 1967. Over on the Hot 100 Singles chart, "The 59th Street Bridge Song (Feelin' Groovy)" peaked at #13 in February 1967 and "Come to the Sunshine" peaked at #37 the following May.

== Background ==
Two Ted Templeman/Dick Scoppettone originals from 1966 were added as bonus cuts to the 2001 Sundazed CD reissue of this title: "Bye, Bye, Bye" and "Lost My Love Today." The latter tune was the "B" side to the single of "The 59th Street Bridge Song (Feelin' Groovy)," Harpers Bizarre's most enduring hit. This recording was also available as an import. It can be found under Warner Brothers label manufactured by His Master's Voice (N.Z.) LTD.

== Track listing ==
1. "Come to the Sunshine" (Van Dyke Parks)
2. "Happy Talk" (Richard Rodgers, Oscar Hammerstein II)
3. "Come Love" (Alan Bergman, Marilyn Keith, Larry Markes)
4. "Raspberry Rug" (Leon Russell, Donna Washburn)
5. "The 59th Street Bridge Song (Feelin' Groovy)" (Paul Simon)
6. "The Debutante's Ball" (Randy Newman)
7. "Happy Land" (Randy Newman)
8. "Peter and the Wolf" (Ron Elliott, Sergei Prokofiev, Robert Durand)
9. "I Can Hear the Darkness" (Leon Russell, Donna Washburn)
10. "Simon Smith and the Amazing Dancing Bear" (Randy Newman)

== Personnel ==
- Guitars: Glen Campbell, Al Casey, Mike Deasy, Don Lanier, Louis Morell, Tommy Tedesco
- Bass: Don Bagley, Carol Kaye, Joe Osborn, Lyle Ritz
- Keyboards: Carl Fortina, Gene Garf, John Gallie, Larry Knechtel, Mike Melvoin, Van Dyke Parks
- Drums: Hal Blaine
- Percussion: Gary Coleman, Victor Feldman, Norm Jeffries, Emil Richards
- Horns: Bud Brisbois, David Duke, Arthur Maebe, Vincent DeRosa, Dick Hyde, Lew McCreary,
  Oliver Mitchell, Roy Caton, Thomas Scott
- Saxophone – Gene Cipriano, Jim Horn, Plas Johnson, Jay Migliori, Abe Most, Bill Perkins
- Woodwinds, Flute: Norman Benno, Bill Green, Bob Hardaway, Jules Jacob, Sidney Miller,
  Wilbur Schwartz
- Strings: Edgar Lustgarten, Harry Bluestone, James Getzoff, Paul Shure
