= With Six You Get Eggroll =

1968 film by Howard Morris

- Promotional release poster
- Directed by: Howard Morris
- Screenplay by: Gwen Bagni; Paul Dubov; Harvey Bullock; R.S. Allen
- Story by: Gwen Bagni; Paul Dubov
- Produced by: Martin Melcher
- Starring: Doris Day; Brian Keith; Pat Carroll; Barbara Hershey; Alice Ghostley; George Carlin; The Grass Roots
- Cinematography: Ellsworth Fredericks; Harry Stradling Jr.
- Edited by: Adrienne Fazan
- Music by: Robert Mersey
- Production companies: Cinema Center Films; Arwin Productions
- Distributed by: National General Pictures
- Release date: August 7, 1968
- Running time: 95 minutes
- Country: United States
- Language: English
- Budget: $2,445,343
- Box office: $10,095,200

With Six You Get Eggroll is a 1968 American romantic comedy film directed by Howard Morris and starring Doris Day, Brian Keith, Barbara Hershey, George Carlin, and Pat Carroll. It was the first film that was produced by the CBS Television Network's film unit, Cinema Center Films, and Day's final film performance (and Carlin's film debut).

The title of the movie comes from a scene where the family goes out for Chinese food, and one of the kids notices that because they are a large group, they get something extra: "With six you get eggroll!" Several movie theater chains included a tie-in promotion with the R.J. Reynolds Tobacco Company where, fulfilling the title, every sixth patron admitted would receive a coupon for a free pack, or a free pack itself, of their Chun King brand reheatable shrimp eggrolls.

== Plot ==
Abby McClure is a widow with three sons who runs the lumberyard that her husband owned. Her matchmaking sister Maxine tricks her into calling divorcee Jake Iverson and inviting him to the business dinner party Abby is having that night. Not interested in the trouble his sexy, adultery-minded neighbor Cleo is trying to get him into, Jake arrives at Abby's and is bored by all of the matchmaking dialogue. Jake makes up an excuse to leave, but later runs into Abby at an all-night supermarket. Embarrassed by being caught in a fib, Jake meets Abby at a local drive-in run by the wise-cracking Herbie and the two stay out until 2 am. A romance develops, much to the chagrin of Jake's teenaged daughter Stacey and Abby's three sons, Flip, Mitch, and Jason. The children make certain that neither Jake nor Abby can be comfortable at the other's home, so the pair winds up more than once at the drive-in, before finally falling in love. Fed up with the situation, they elope, not telling their children that they have married until the next day, when the children discover them in bed together.

From then on, Abby's sons fight with Iverson's daughter Stacey, Flip and Stacey both are hostile to the idea of a stepparent, and even Abby's sheepdog and Jake's poodle are incompatible. Neither's house is large enough for the family of six—not including Abby's live-in maid, Molly, so they borrow a camper and use it as a bedroom while they move into Abby's house and eventually put Jake's up for sale.

The morning after a bedtime argument, Abby drives off in the camper in a rage; Jake is dumped out clad only in boxers and clutching a teddy bear. After running through the neighborhood, he gets Herbie to lend him some clothes and drive him back to his house. Once Abby discovers what has happened, she returns, only to find Jake gone. She is joined by a band of hippies she meets when she reaches the drive-in. When the camper collides with a livestock truck carrying chickens, Abby and the hippies are arrested. Hearing of the accident, Jake and the children rush to her rescue, colliding with the same chicken truck. The angry driver assaults Jake, and the children (and pets) unite in his defense. At the stationhouse, the parents and children are joyfully reconciled, and the family finally buys a huge two-story house big enough for a family of six, a maid, and two dogs.

== Cast ==
=== McClure family ===
- Doris Day as Abby McClure
- John Findlater as Flip McClure
- Richard Steele as Jason McClure
- Jimmy Bracken as Mitch McClure
- Pat Carroll as Maxine Scott, Abby's sister
- Herb Voland as Harry Scott, Abby's brother-in-law

=== Iverson family ===
- Brian Keith as Jake Iverson
- Barbara Hershey as Stacey Iverson

=== Others ===
- George Carlin as Herbie Fleck
- Alice Ghostley as Abby's maid, Molly
- Jamie Farr as Jo Jo
- William Christopher as Zip-Cloud
- Elaine Devry as Cleo Ruskin, Jake's next-door neighbor
- Milton Frome as Bud Young
- Jackie Joseph as Georgia Watson
- Victor Tayback as truck driver
- Allan Melvin as Police Desk Sergeant
- The Grass Roots as themselves

== Production notes ==
It was the first film made by the newly formed Cinema Center Films, a subdivision of CBS network.

=== Supporting cast ===
The cast includes several actors in small parts (some uncredited) who are much better known for other performances, such as Jamie Farr, William Christopher, Ken Osmond, Allan Melvin, Jackie Joseph, Milton Frome, Vic Tayback, George Carlin, Peter Leeds, Howard Morris, Maudie Prickett and Creed Bratton (part of the singing group The Grass Roots). Many of them (as well as Day herself, in The Doris Day Show) later turned up in TV sitcoms: Farr and Christopher in M*A*S*H, Tayback in Alice, Carlin in The George Carlin Show and Bratton in The Office. (Keith was starring in Family Affair at the time, while Osmond had played the iconic Eddie Haskell in Leave It to Beaver.)

==== Cast Photos ====
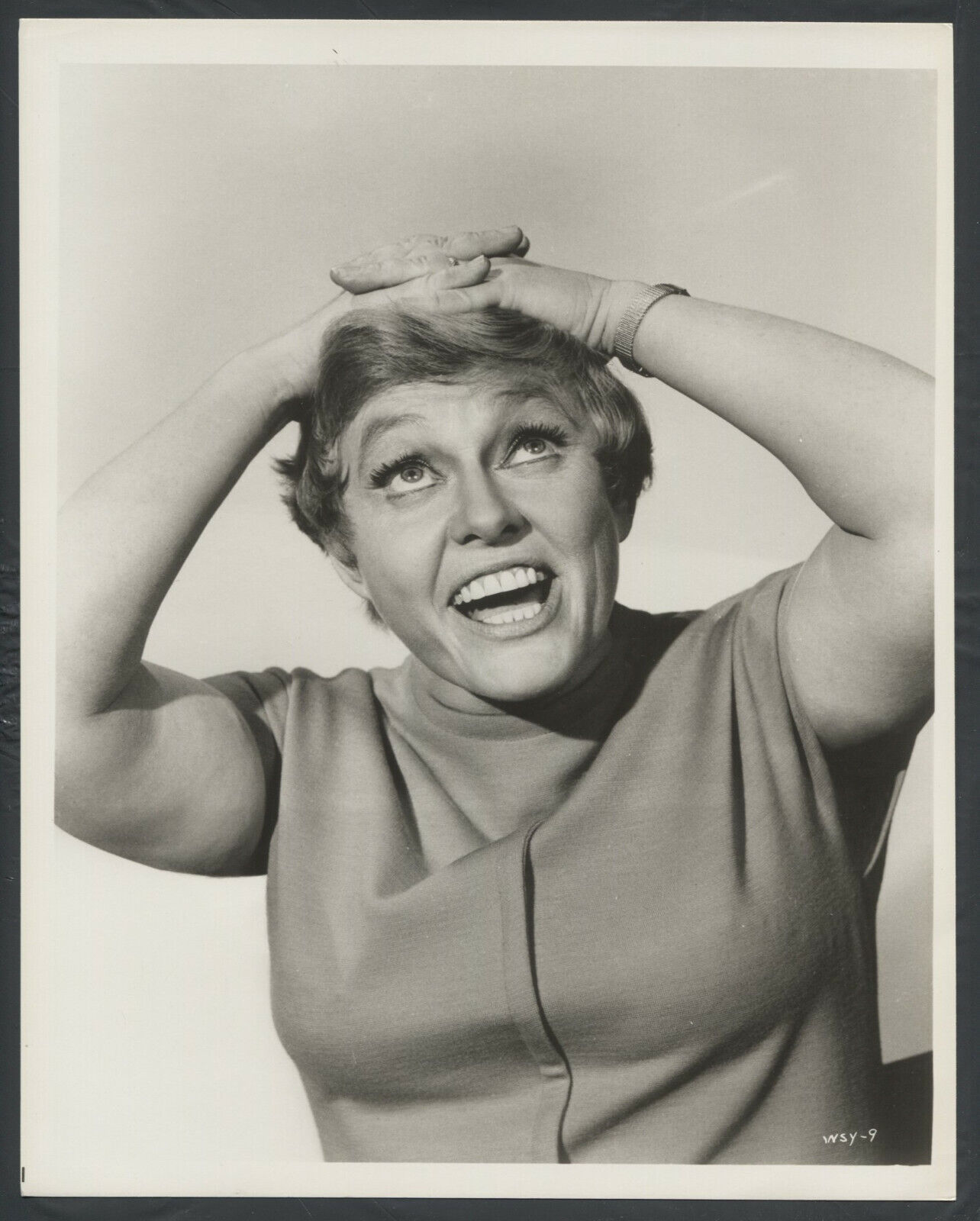
Pat Carroll

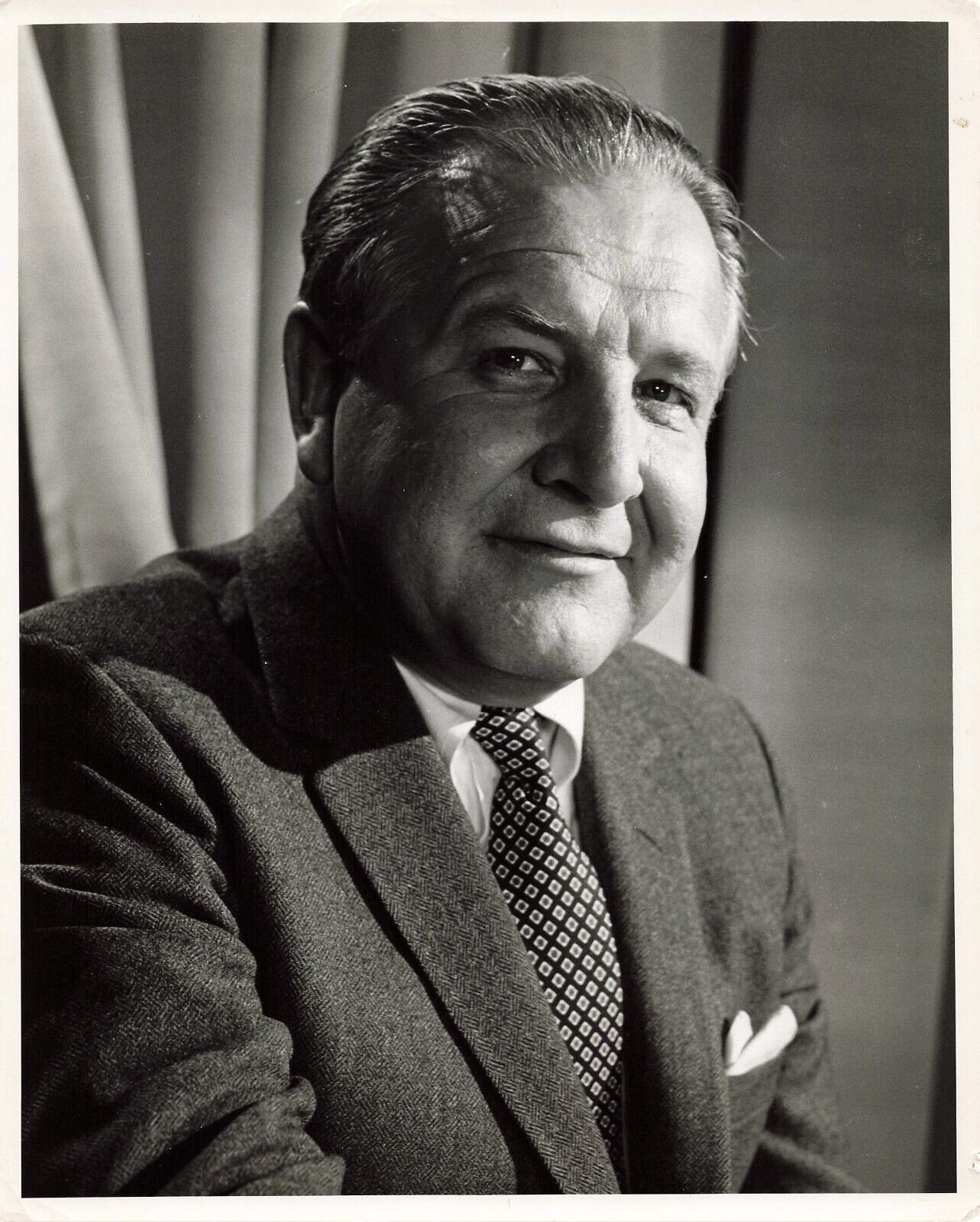
Herb Voland

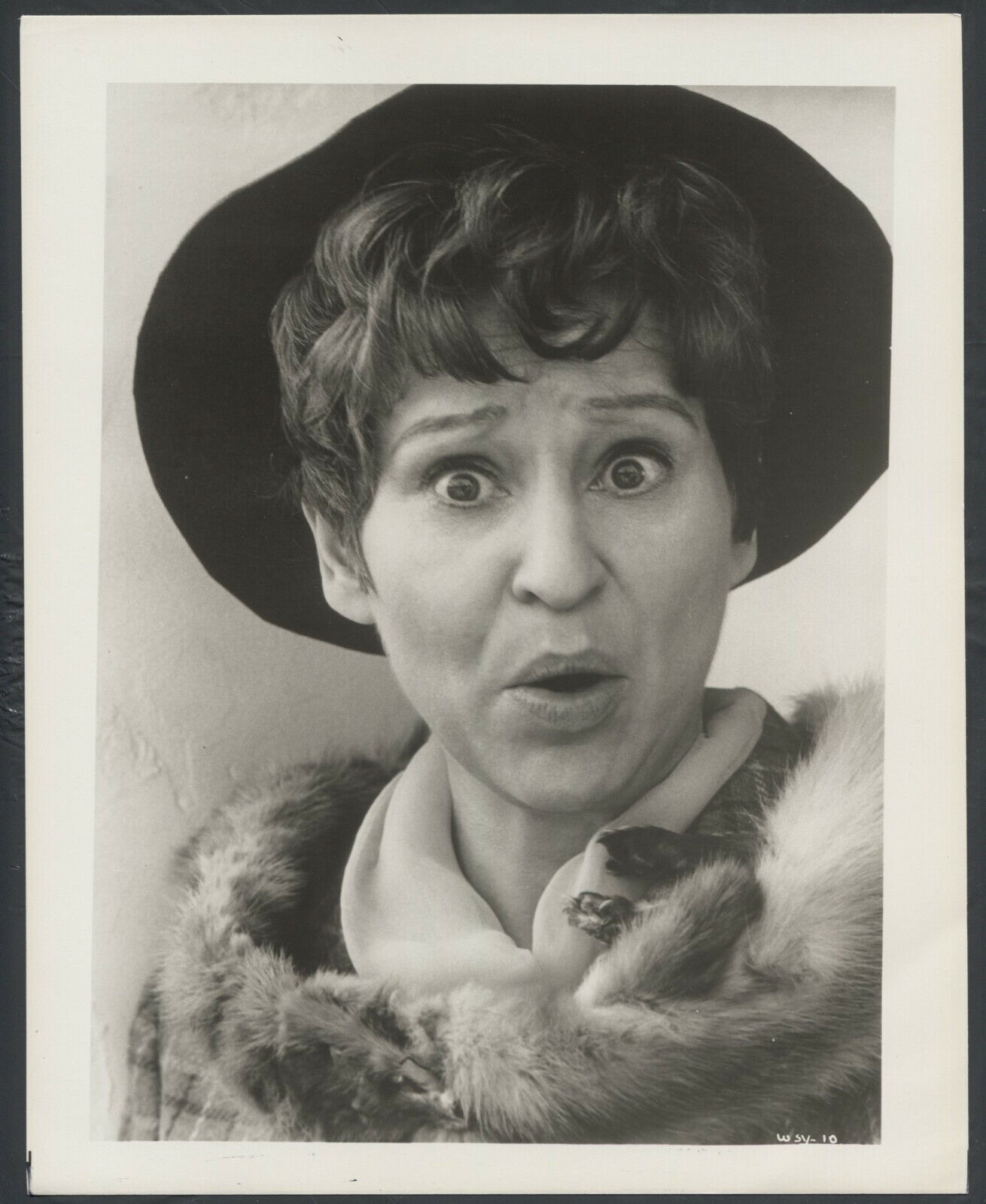
Alice Ghostley

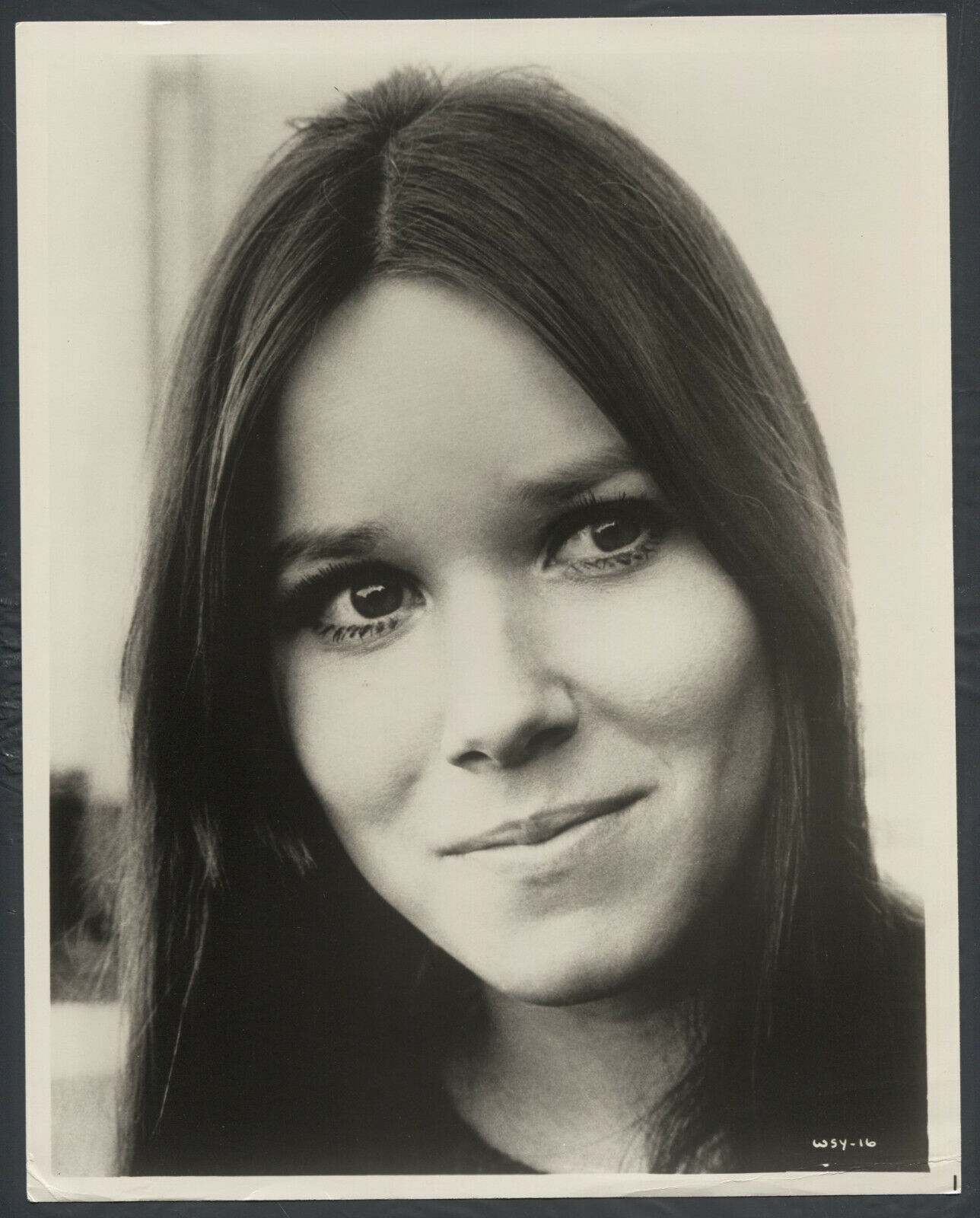
Barbara Hershey

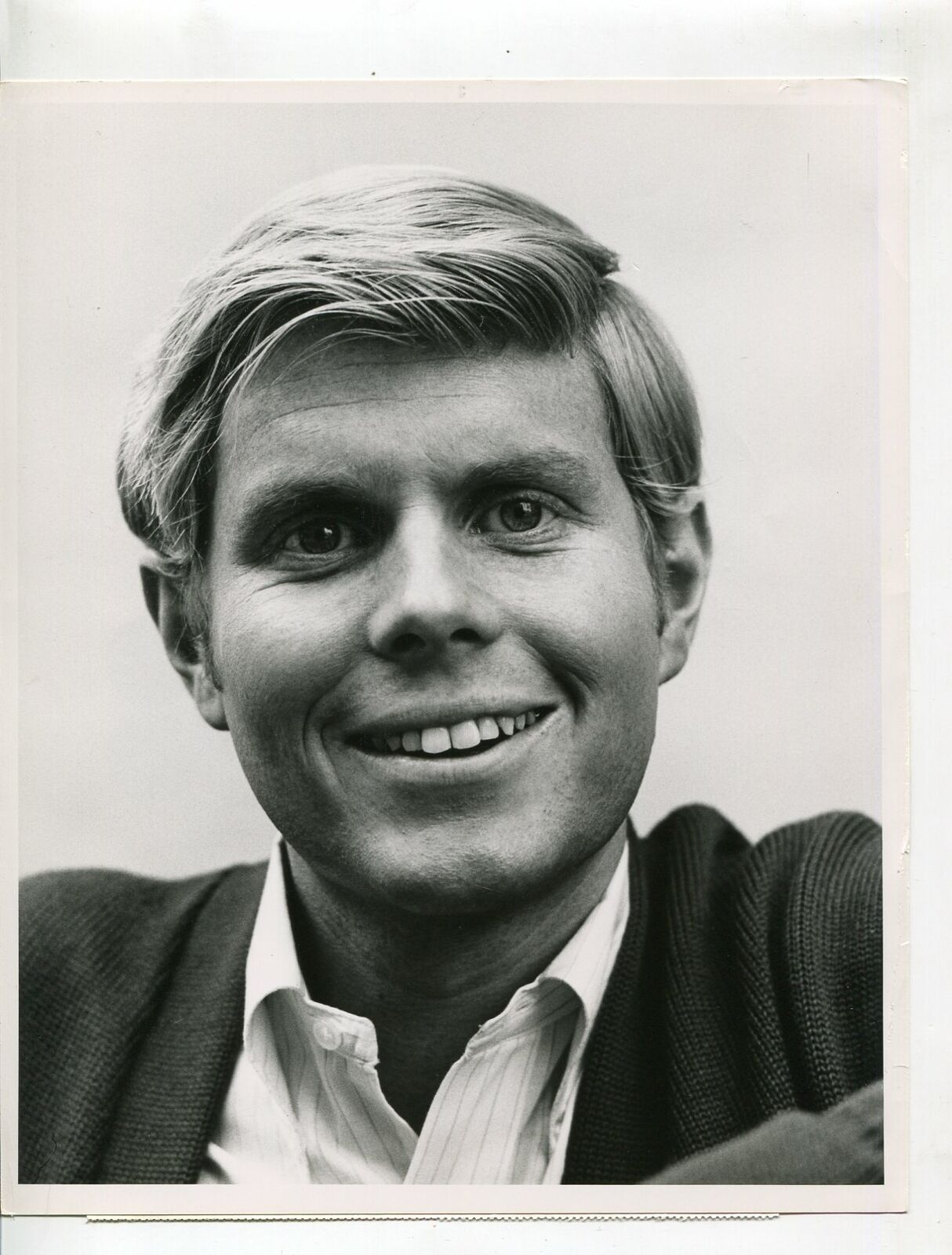
John Findlater

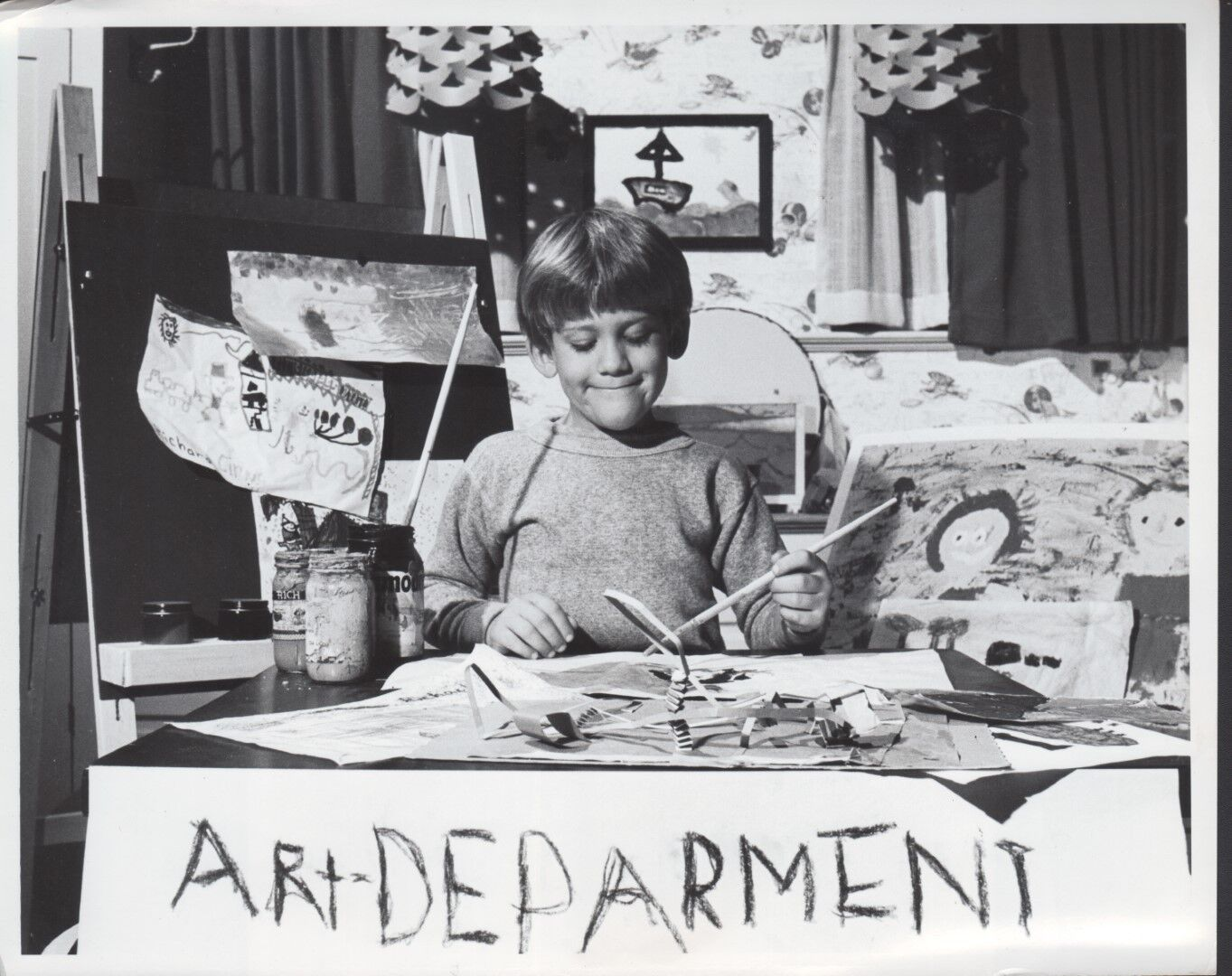
Richard Steele

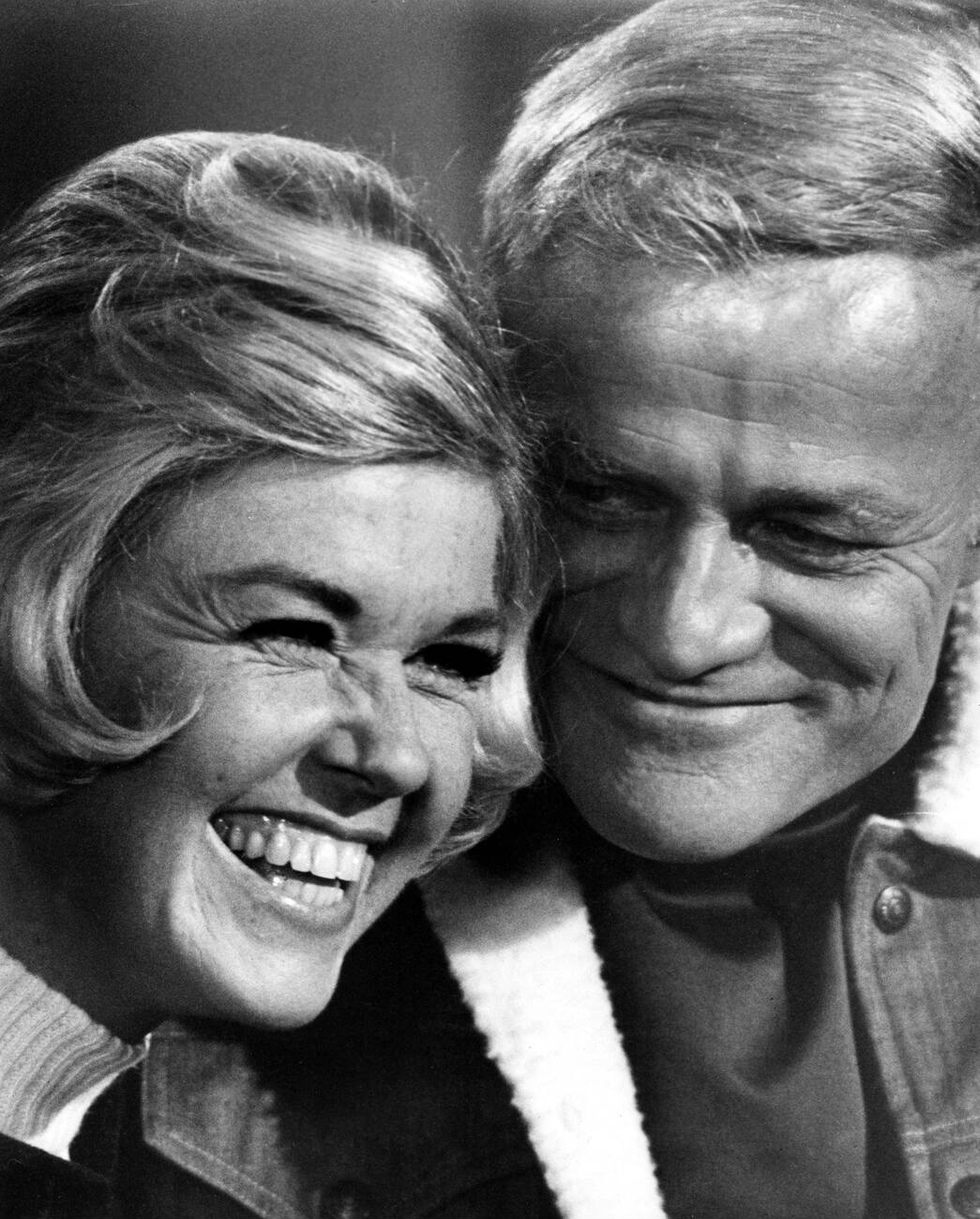
Doris Day and Brian Keith

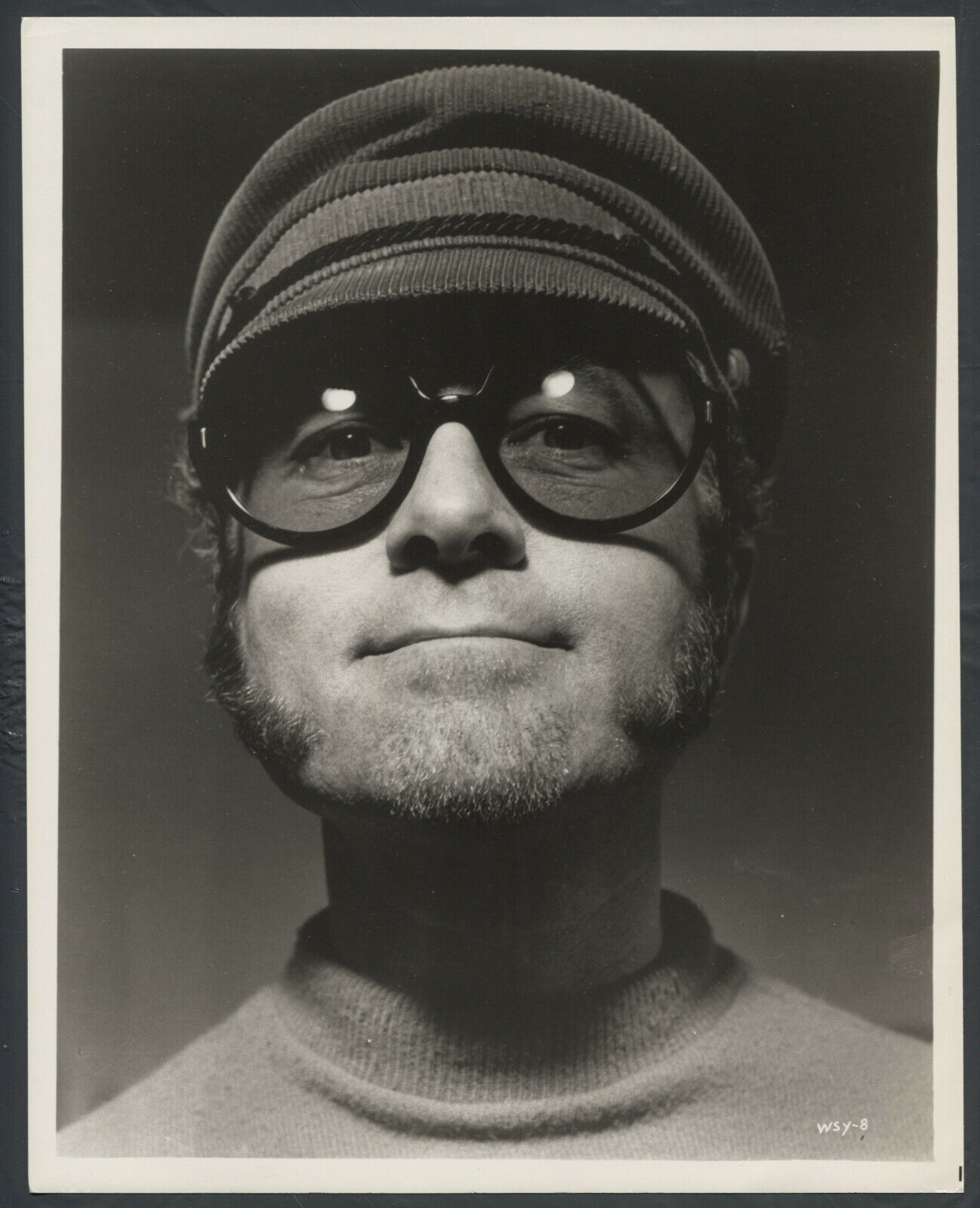
Howard Morris

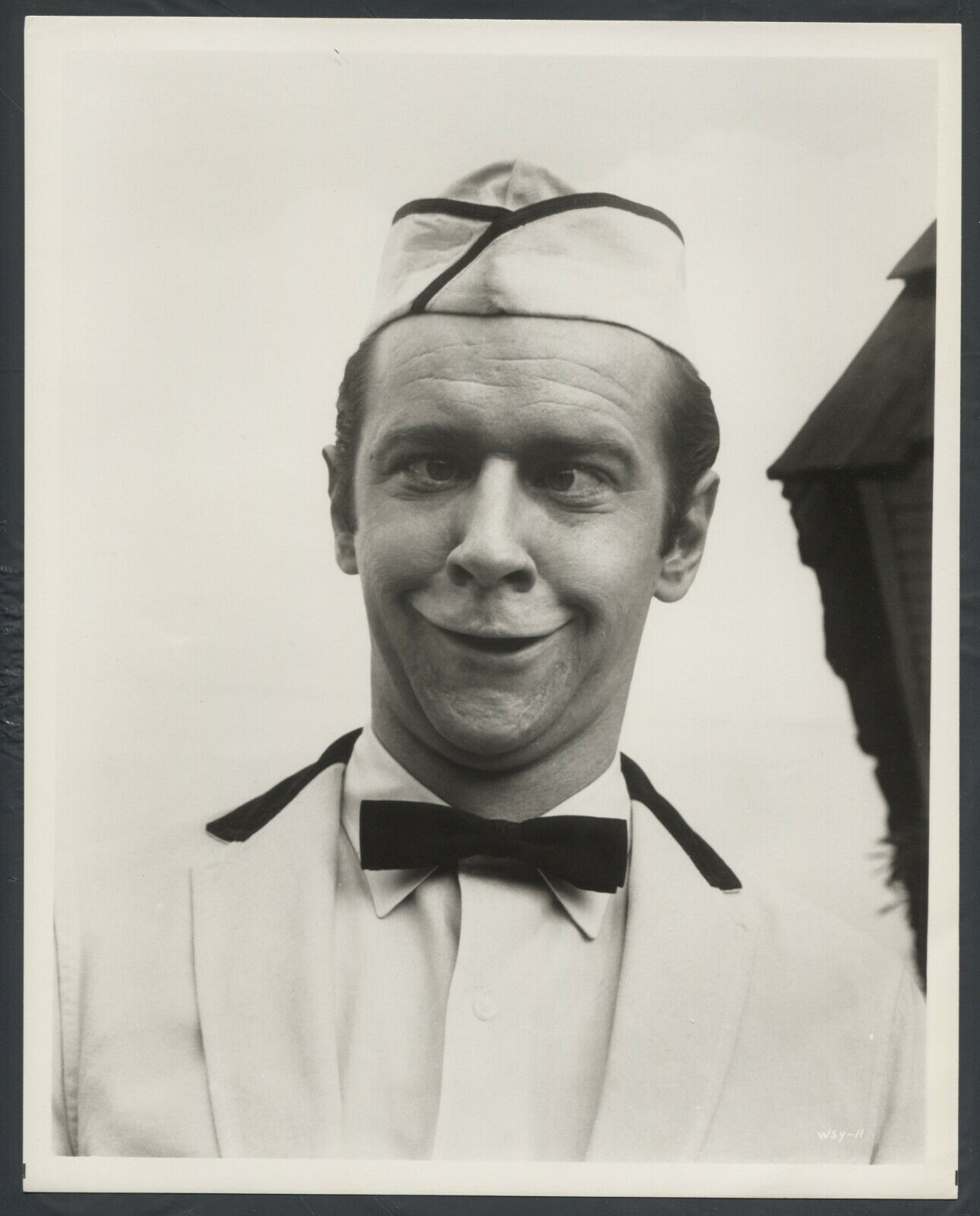
George Carlin

=== Blended family premise ===
The film was released only four months after United Artists' Yours, Mine and Ours. While both films have the same premise—that of a widow and a widower marrying each other and creating a blended family—the United Artists film was based on a true story and was a huge commercial success (if not critical) becoming the 11th highest-grossing film of the year.

Although there are similarities between this film, Yours, Mine and Ours and the later ABC television show The Brady Bunch that premiered in 1969, the original pilot script for The Brady Bunch predated the scripts for both of these films.

== Film locations ==
Most of the film's exterior locations were within a five-mile radius of each other:

=== Studio City/Valley Village ===
==== Ye Olde Drive Inn ====
The location used for Herbie Fleck's "Ye Olde Drive Inn" was a drive-in on Ventura Place, near CBS Studio Center around the intersection of Ventura Boulevard and Laurel Canyon Boulevard. The site is now a sporting goods store.

==== School scenes ====
School scenes were filmed at Ulysses S. Grant High School in Valley Village (at the time Van Nuys), California.

=== Toluca Lake ===
Both of the houses seen in the film are within a block of each other in the suburb of Toluca Lake, which straddles the borders of Los Angeles and Burbank in the San Fernando Valley. The neighborhood that Abby drives the camper truck through is the northern part of Toluca Lake, specifically Kling Street between Arcola Avenue and Cahuenga Avenue.

==== McClure house ====
The exterior shots for Abby McClure's late-1930s Tudor Revival home were filmed at 4248 Clybourn Avenue; the same house number is also used in the film. The interiors are soundstage sets that bear no resemblance to the house's actual interior. A studio replica of the street-facing façade was also used for some night shots—discernible by the differences in the tree in the front yard—specifically for the scene with rain. A still photograph of the house across the street (4245 Clybourn Avenue) can be seen earlier in the same sequence where Jake arrives on the porch of the McClure house. The homes to the right have all had major remodelings, as well as the McClure house, which is almost unrecognizable as the same house today. However, the fire hydrant at the sidewalk, the covered driveway and the front yard tree all remain as of October 2013.

==== Iverson house ====
The exterior shots for Jake Iverson's 1929 Mission Revival home were shot at 10011 Tikita Place. All of the exterior night shots were filmed at this location. The interiors—as well as the backyard—are also soundstage sets that bear no resemblance to the house's actual interior and backyard. The house to the left of the Iverson house has undergone major remodeling, whereas the Iverson house still looked very similar to its appearance in this film until about 2014. As of September 2015, the Iverson house was completely demolished and replaced with a faux-traditional home.

==== Iverson-McClure house ====
The film's final punchline—a large two-story early-1950s Colonial house shown briefly at the end with a "Sold" sign on it and a front pathway flanked by the McClures' sheepdog and the Iversons' poodle—is also in Toluca Lake, at 10463 Kling Street.

==== Police chase scene ====
The late 1930s two-story Colonial house with the circle driveway that the police chase drives through is at 10501 Kling Street (to the immediate left of the above-mentioned Iverson-McClure house at 10463 Kling).

== Music ==
The film's score was composed and conducted by CBS Television and Columbia Records staff arranger/composer Robert Mersey.

While Day provided a vocal performance either onscreen, in voice-over or over the credits in all of her movies since 1958's The Tunnel of Love, this is one of only three films not to feature a vocal by Day (the others being 1967's The Ballad of Josie and 1968's Where Were You When the Lights Went Out?). A male chorus is heard singing an easy-listening piece called "You Make Me Think About You" in one sequence, but no vocals are heard by Day. A 45 rpm single featuring a vocal by Johnny Mathis and arranged and conducted by Robert Mersey was released by Columbia Records. The single peaked at number 35 on Billboard's Easy Listening Chart.

In the club scene, where Doris Day's character is talking with her sister and brother-in-law, The Grass Roots are playing the title song from their 1968 album Feelings in the background.

== Release ==
=== Box office ===
After its release, the film went on to gross $10,095,200 at the box office according to Variety and the box office website The Numbers, making it one of the top ten moneymaking films of Day's 39-film career.

Variety said it earned $4.5 million in theatrical rentals in the US and Canada. It would be one of the few hits from CCF.

=== Critical ===
Upon its theatrical release, Vincent Canby of The New York Times wrote: "The latest chapter in the continuing adventures of the Widow Day… was produced by Cinema Center Films, a subsidiary of the Columbia Broadcasting System… I kept wondering how the characters played by Miss Day lose their husbands. Cancer? Suicide? Auto accident? There's never any hint. There are, however, some hints of the very real comic talent that has, over the years, become hermetically sealed inside a lacquered personality."

== Home media ==
The film was released by CBS DVD through Paramount Home Entertainment on May 3, 2005, as a Region 1 DVD, in widescreen format. The film is available at iTunes Store.

== See also ==
- List of American films of 1968
- Yours, Mine and Ours (1968)
- The Brady Bunch (1969–1974)
