= Harpers Bizarre 4 =

Studio album by Harpers Bizarre
- Released: 1969
- Genre: Sunshine pop; soft rock
- Length: 37:03
- Label: Warner Bros.
- Producer: Lenny Waronker

Harpers Bizarre chronology
The Secret Life of Harpers Bizarre (1968)	Harpers Bizarre 4 (1969)	As Time Goes By (1976)

Professional ratings
Review scores
Source	Rating
Allmusic	2.5/5 stars
The Village Voice	C+

Harpers Bizarre 4 is the fourth studio album by Harpers Bizarre, released in 1969. Ry Cooder contributes on slide guitar.

The film I Love You, Alice B. Toklas featured music from Harpers Bizarre.

Two bonus tracks were added to the 2001 Sundazed CD reissue of this title: "Poly High" by Harry Nilsson and "If We Ever Needed the Lord Before" by Thomas A. Dorsey.

== Track listing ==
1. "Soft Soundin' Music" (Dick Scoppettone, Ted Templeman)
2. "Knock on Wood" (Steve Cropper, Eddie Floyd)
3. "Witchi Tai to" (Jim Pepper)
4. "Hard to Handle" (Alvertis Isbell, Allen Jones, Otis Redding)
5. "When the Band Begins to Play" (Scoppettone, Templeman)
6. "Something Better" (Gerry Goffin, Barry Mann)
7. "Blackbird" (John Lennon, Paul McCartney)
8. "I Love You, Alice B. Toklas" (Elmer Bernstein, Paul Mazursky, Larry Tucker)
9. "There's No Time Like Today" (Scoppettone, Templeman)
10. "All Through the Night" (John Petersen, Scoppettone, Templeman)
11. "Cotton Candy Sandman (Sandman's Coming)" (Kenny Rankin)
12. "Leaving on a Jet Plane" (John Denver)

=== 2001 Remaster Bonus Tracks ===
1. "Poly High" (Harry Nilsson)
2. "If We Ever Needed the Lord Before" (traditional, Thomas A. Dorsey)
