= You Make Me Think About You =

- US 7-inch single

Single by Johnny Mathis

from the album Those Were the Days
- B-side: "Night Dreams"
- Released: September 3, 1968
- Recorded: July 22, 1968
- Genre: Easy listening
- Length: 1:59
- Label: Columbia
- Songwriters: Bob Hilliard; Robert Mersey
- Producer: Robert Mersey

Johnny Mathis singles chronology
"Venus" (1968)	"You Make Me Think About You" (1968)	"The 59th Street Bridge Song (Feelin' Groovy)" (1969)

Music video
- "You Make Me Think About You" on YouTube

"You Make Me Think About You" is a popular song written by Bob Hilliard and Robert Mersey for the 1968 film With Six You Get Eggroll. The song was a minor Easy Listening hit for Johnny Mathis that year.

== In With Six You Get Eggroll ==
"You Make Me Think About You" is sung by a male chorus in the film. The main character, Abby McClure (Doris Day), has come home from the second of two unpleasant encounters with her love interest, Jake Iverson (Brian Keith). The song plays as she gets a bite of food from her kitchen, goes upstairs and gets into bed, and returns downstairs after Jake rings the doorbell and wants to talk.

== Recording and release ==
Johnny Mathis recorded "You Make Me Think About You" on July 22, 1968, with an orchestra conducted by Robert Mersey, who also produced the recording. It was released as a single six weeks later, on September 3. It was also included on his next album, Those Were the Days, which was released two months after the single, on November 6.

== Chart performance ==
"You Make Me Think About You" debuted on Billboard magazine's Easy Listening chart in the issue dated October 12, 1968, and got as high as number 35 during its four weeks there.

== Critical reception ==
The editors of Billboard wrote, "Compelling film theme … gets an equally moving vocal treatment by Johnny Mathis."

== Charts ==
Weekly chart performance for "You Make Me Think About You"
Chart (1968)	Peak position
US Billboard Easy Listening	35
