= As Time Goes By (Harpers Bizarre album) =

Studio album by Harpers Bizarre
- Released: 1976
- Genre: Pop
- Label: Forest Bay

Harpers Bizarre chronology
Harpers Bizarre 4 (1969)	As Time Goes By (1976)	Feelin' Groovy: The Best of Harpers Bizarre (1997)

Professional ratings
Review scores
Source	Rating
Allmusic	2/5 stars

As Time Goes By is the fifth and final studio album by Harpers Bizarre, released in 1976.

This reunion release of the group does not include former member Ted Templeman, who by this point, had established himself as a record producer.

Dick Scoppettone used several pseudonyms for his original songs (Gene Bob Smith, Misha Mack, Jack Van Gleason, Lord John, Joseph Bocci).

== Track listing ==
1. "Introduction"
2. "Cowboy" (Gene Bob Smith)
3. "As Time Goes By" (Herman Hupfeld)
4. "Down at Papa Joe's" (Jerry Dean Smith)
5. "Every Night" (Paul McCartney)
6. "Society Strut" (Misha Mack, Jack Van Gleason)
7. "Lullaby of Broadway" (Harry Warren, Al Dubin)
8. "Speak Low" (Kurt Weill/Ogden Nash)
9. "Banana King Louie" (Lord John)
10. "My Melancholy Baby" (Ernie Burnett, George Norton; arr. by Ray Keller, Jack Van Gleason)
11. "Beechwood 4-5789" (William "Mickey" Stevenson, Berry Gordy, Marvin Gaye)
12. "That's the Way It Was (from Dvorak's "New World Symphony")" (Joseph Bocci, Robert Frost; arr. by Ray Keller, Jack Van Gleason)
13. "Back in the Saddle Again" (Ray Whitley, Gene Autry)

On the Canadian release, simply entitled HARPER'S BIZARRE (Polydor 2424 162) four tracks ("Every Night", "Banana King Louie", "Beechwood 4-5789", and "That's the Way It Was") were omitted and replaced by "Feelin' Groovy" (re-recorded version),"Listen To The Rain" (Scoppetone), "You Gotta Make Your Own Sunshine", and "Young Love"; the last two were issued as a 45 in the U.S.
