= Cinema Center Films =

American film production company

- Type: Division
- Industry: Film
- Founded: 1967; 59 years ago
- Founders: William S. Paley; Frank Stanton; Gordon T. Stulberg
- Defunct: August 9, 1972; 54 years ago
- Fate: Closed
- Successors: Company: CBS Theatrical Films (1979–1985); Library: CBS Broadcasting Inc. Paramount Pictures
- Headquarters: Hollywood, United States
- Area served: Worldwide
- Key people: Gordon T. Stulberg
- Products: Motion pictures
- Net income: $10 million loss (1971 est.)
- Owner: CBS

Cinema Center Films (CCF) was the theatrical film production company of the CBS Television Network from 1967 to 1972. Its films were distributed by National General Pictures. The production unit was located at CBS Studio Center in the Studio City district of Los Angeles in the San Fernando Valley, and produced 30 films. (Note: Orders of Magnitude I: Majors, Mini-majors, "Instant Majors", and Independents. Page 331-332.)

== History ==
CBS chairman William S. Paley and Frank Stanton founded the network's first film division, Cinema Center Films, in 1967, with Gordon T. Stulberg as its first chief.

In February 1967, CBS had bought for $9.5 million the studios of Republic Pictures (which would be renamed CBS Studio Center). The following month they announced Stulberg's appointment, stating they intended to make ten films a year at a cost of $3.5 million each on average. Paley and Stulberg met with Gulf & Western chairman Charles Bluhdorn, who had just acquired Paramount Pictures, in a search for a distributor, but Bluhdorn's over-chumminess turned off Paley. Stulberg reported to John A. Schneider, CBS network president.

The studio's first notable talent signing was with Doris Day which resulted in their first movie With Six You Get Eggroll. Initially, CCF was generally termed by the film community as a maker only of "fluffy films" that seemed designed for rebroadcast on CBS.

Their second signing was with Bob Banner Associates, who were to make a series of projects that did not come to fruition. National General Pictures agreed to distribute their films in August 1967, agreeing to provide $60 million for 22 movies.

They signed a four-picture deal in October 1967 with Jalem Productions, Jack Lemmon's company, worth $21 million – Jalem was to produce four films, two in which Lemmon was to appear. The deal gave way to The April Fools (1969) and The War Between Men and Women (1972).

Other people who signed deals with the company included producer William Graf, and actor Steve McQueen via his company Solar Productions. Robert Culp's company also signed.

Ogilvy Mather was hired in July 1969 to provide advertising for the division. To counter-act the film community's perception of being a "fluffy films" producer, Stulberg recommended making The Boys in the Band to Paley. Little Big Man was CCF's biggest hit at the box office despite a cost overrun. CCF also financed a Broadway production, Does a Tiger Wear a Necktie?, a Don Petersen drama that opened in February 1970. Paley moved responsibility at CBS for CCF from Schneider to Goddard Lieberson, president of Columbia Records, which was then owned by CBS.

Twenty-six films were produced under Stulberg until he left to work at 20th Century Fox in 1971. CBS closed the unit in 1972; its last film was the Peanuts animated musical Snoopy Come Home. The studio never reported a profit in any year of its operation, losing money on 20 out of 27 films for a total loss of $30 million.

== Postscript ==
Distribution of Cinema Center's films were transferred from National General Pictures to Warner Bros. in a November 1973 deal that also included those of First Artists Productions. (Note: Orders of Magnitude I: Majors, Mini-majors, "Instant Majors", and Independents. Page 308.)

CBS licensed 28 CCF films to Viacom in 1979 for $30 million. Another look at Cinema Center Films found that it was profitable. Since its closure, its films had been generating income via network and pay TV ancillary markets, thus CBS attempted another return to the theatrical film production business in 1982, with a unit known as CBS Theatrical Films, as well as with Tri-Star Pictures, the joint venture between CBS, HBO and Columbia Pictures. CBS closed down CBS Theatrical Films and dropped out of Tri-Star in 1985. (Note: Tri-Star is now currently a unit of Sony Pictures Entertainment.) (Note: Tri-Star's former joint venture, CBS and HBO, are currently owned by Skydance Corporation.)

CBS would later fall under common ownership with Paramount Pictures after being bought by Viacom (Paramount's parent since 1994 and originally the syndication arm of CBS) in 2000 (which CBS was majority-owned by National Amusements from 2000 to 2025). CBS and Viacom split again in 2006, with CBS becoming a unit of CBS Corporation, but both were still majority-owned by National Amusements. CBS eventually launched a new film unit independent of Viacom and Paramount in March 2007, called CBS Films (which Lionsgate took over CBS Films' U.S. distribution and global sales functions in 2015). On December 4, 2019, CBS Films was folded into the main CBS Entertainment Group after releasing Jexi, at the same time CBS also announced that it will re-merge with Viacom to form ViacomCBS (now Skydance Corporation), reuniting CBS with Paramount.

After Paramount Skydance Corporation merged with Warner Bros. Discovery to form Skydance Corporation on October 6, 2026, the Cinema Center Films library reunited with the National General Pictures and First Artists Productions libraries.

== See also ==
- Indiewood
- New Hollywood
