= Al Burton =

American composer, conductor, consultant, producer, production manager and screenwriter

- Born: Alan Burton Goldstone; April 9, 1928; Columbus, Ohio, U.S.
- Died: October 22, 2019 (aged 91); San Mateo, California, U.S.
- Education: Northwestern University
- Occupations: Composer, conductor, consultant, producer, production manager, screenwriter
- Years active: 1949–2019
- Spouse: Sally Burton

Alan Burton Goldstone (April 9, 1928 – October 22, 2019) was an American composer, conductor, consultant, producer, production manager and screenwriter.

== Early life ==
Burton was born in Columbus, Ohio. He graduated from Northwestern University, when he earned his degree, in 1948.

== Career ==
Burton started his career in 1949, as producing and writing the variety Campus to Campus.

From the 1950s to the 1970s, Burton produced television programs and films, including, The Oscar Levant Show, Hollywood a Go-Go and Malibu U, among others.

From the 1970s to the 1980s, Burton started working with screenwriter, Norman Lear on his soap opera television series, Mary Hartman, Mary Hartman. He also was a composer, conductor and consultant for Diff'rent Strokes (and its spin-off The Facts of Life) and Hello, Larry.

From the 1980s to 2019, Burton worked on Charles in Charge, as the executive producer. Later in his career, he worked on Family Guy, The Tonight Show Starring Jimmy Fallon, The Goldbergs, Saturday Night Live and Brooklyn Nine-Nine.

== Death ==
Burton died on October 22, 2019, of natural causes at his home in San Mateo, California, at the age of 91.
