= The Secret Life of Harpers Bizarre =

Studio album by Harpers Bizarre
- Released: September 1968
- Genre: Sunshine pop; soft rock
- Length: 42:19
- Label: Warner Bros.
- Producer: Lenny Waronker

Harpers Bizarre chronology
Anything Goes (1968)	The Secret Life of Harpers Bizarre (1968)	Harpers Bizarre 4 (1969)

Professional ratings
Review scores
Source	Rating
Allmusic	1.5/5 stars

The Secret Life of Harpers Bizarre is the third studio album by Harpers Bizarre, released in September 1968.

Two bonus tracks were added to the 2001 Sundazed CD reissue of this title. They had previously been the two sides of a single: "Both Sides Now" by Joni Mitchell and "Small Talk" by Garry Bonner and Alan Gordon.

== Track listing ==
1. "Look to the Rainbow" (E.Y. Harburg, Burton Lane)
2. "Battle of New Orleans" (Jimmy Driftwood)
3. "When I Was a Cowboy" (Sylvia Fricker, Ian Tyson)
4. "Interlude"
5. "Sentimental Journey" (Les Brown, Bud Green, Ben Homer)
6. "Las Mananitas" (Traditional)
7. Medley: "Bye, Bye, Bye" (Ted Templeman, Dick Scoppettone) / "Vine Street" (Randy Newman)
8. "Me, Japanese Boy" (Burt Bacharach, Hal David)
9. "Interlude"
10. "I'll Build a Stairway to Paradise" (Buddy DeSylva, George Gershwin, Ira Gershwin)
11. "Green Apple Tree" (Dick Scoppettone, Ted Templeman)
12. "Sit Down, You're Rocking the Boat" (Frank Loesser)
13. "Interlude"
14. "I Love You, Mama" (Ron Elliott)
15. "Funny How Love Can Be" (Leon Bowman)
16. "Mad" (Dick Scoppettone, Ted Templeman)
17. "Look to the Rainbow" (E.Y. Harburg, Burton Lane)
18. "The Drifter" (Roger Nichols, Paul Williams)
19. "Reprise"
