= Gordon Stulberg =

Canadian-American film executive and lawyer

Gordon T. Stulberg
- Born: December 17, 1923; Toronto
- Died: October 12, 2000 (aged 76)
- Education: University of Toronto; Cornell University
- Known for: president and chief operating officer of 20th Century Fox, Cinema Center Films, PolyGram Pictures
- Spouse: Helen Applebaum
- Children: 4

Gordon T. Stulberg (17 December 1923 – 12 October 2000) was a Canadian-American film executive and lawyer, best known for a long stint as president and chief operating officer of 20th Century Fox and Cinema Center Films and PolyGram Pictures.

== Early life and education ==
Stulberg was born into a Jewish family in Toronto, the son of a labor organizer. He graduated with a B.A. from the University of Toronto and a J.D. from Cornell University before moving to Los Angeles. He became a naturalized citizen of the US in 1951.

== Career ==
After school, he worked in entertainment law with the firm Pacht, Ross, Warne & Bernhard and represented among others the Writers Guild of America. In the 1954 writers strike he served as chief counsel and negotiator for the guild helping to establish the concept of "separation of rights and residuals". This concept ensured that all writers would receive payment for their work regardless of the format in which it was used, be it in plays, radio, television, film, or simply for sales promotion. In 1956, Stulberg joined Columbia Pictures as an executive assistant to Ben Kahane, second in charge to Harry Cohn, and worked his way up through the company, becoming in 1960, vice president and chief studio administrative officer.

=== Studio Head ===
In 1967, Stulberg was hired by CBS president William S. Paley to run CBS' new motion picture division, called Cinema Center Films where he oversaw 26 films including Little Big Man (1970) and The Boys in the Band (1971).

In 1971, he was approached by 20th Century Fox to be president and chief operating officer when Fox's future was threatened by banks intending to call in their loans, which they offered to extend only if Stulberg was hired. He worked with chairman and CEO Dennis Stanfill. Stulberg worked to turn around the studio's financial performance. He had some notable successes and some failures as well but over all opinion on Stulberg's tenure was quite positive. This was due to his efforts in salvaging and reallocating misused funds, revamping the studio's sagging image, and his foresight in making such films as the epic classic Star Wars (1977) and cult favorites like Rocky Horror Picture Show (1975), Young Frankenstein (1974) and Sounder (1972). In 1974, Stulberg left Fox after differences with Stanfill and returned to practicing law at the entertainment law firm of Mitchell, Silberberg and Knupp for five years.

He returned to the film business in 1980 and became president of PolyGram Pictures, making Endless Love (1981) and An American Werewolf in London (1981). He later became head of American Interative Media, chairman of the board of Philips Interactive Media of America and a director of Trimark Pictures.

== Personal life ==
Stulberg was married to Helen (née Applebaum) Stulberg (1925–2010). They had four children: Jac Stulberg (from Helen's first marriage), Sita Stulberg, Scott Stulberg and Lysienne "Lysa" Stulberg. Stulberg died from complications related to diabetes.

== Selected filmography ==
=== Films made under Stulberg at Cinema Center Films ===
- With Six You Get Eggroll (1968)
- A Fine Pair (1968)
- The April Fools (1969)
- Hail, Hero! (1969)
- Me, Natalie (1969)
- The Reivers (1969)
- The Royal Hunt of the Sun (1969)
- A Boy Named Charlie Brown (1969)
- The Boys in the Band (1970)
- Little Big Man (1970)
- A Man Called Horse (1970)
- Monte Walsh (1970)
- Rio Lobo (1970)
- Something for Everyone (1970)
- Scrooge (1970)
- Darker Than Amber (1970)
- Adam at Six A.M. (1970)
- Homer (1970)
- Big Jake (1971)
- Le Mans (1971)
- Who Is Harry Kellerman and Why Is He Saying Those Terrible Things About Me? (1971)
- Something Big (1971)
- The Christian Licorice Store (1971)
- The African Elephant (1971)
- Blue Water, White Death (1971)
- Prime Cut (1972)

=== Films made under Stulberg at 20th Century Fox ===
- The Poseidon Adventure (1972)
- Sounder (1972)
- Sleuth (1972)
- The Heartbreak Kid (1972)
- The Paper Chase (1973)
- The Three Musketeers (1973)
- The Last American Hero (1973)
- Emperor of the North Pole (1973)
- Cinderella Liberty (1973)
- The Seven Ups (1973)
- The Four Musketeers (1974)
- The Towering Inferno (1974)
- Harry and Tonto (1974)
- Dirty Mary Crazy Larry (1974)
- Zardoz (1974)
- Conrack (1974)
- 11 Harrowhouse (1974)
- 99 and 44/100% Dead (1974)
- The Crazy World of Julius Vrooder (1974)
- Young Frankenstein (1974)
- The Rocky Horror Picture Show (1975)
- Star Wars (1977)

=== Films made under Stulberg at Polygram ===
- Endless Love (1981)
- An American Werewolf in London (1981)
