= Yours, Mine & Ours (2005 film) =

2005 film by Raja Gosnell

- Theatrical release poster
- Directed by: Raja Gosnell
- Screenplay by: Ron Burch; David Kidd
- Based on: Yours, Mine and Ours; 1968 film by Mort Lachman; Melville Shavelson; Bob Carroll Jr. Madelyn Davis
- Produced by: Robert Simonds; Michael G. Nathanson
- Starring: Dennis Quaid; Rene Russo; Rip Torn; Linda Hunt
- Cinematography: Theo van de Sande
- Edited by: Bruce Green; Stephen A. Rotter
- Music by: Christophe Beck
- Production companies: Metro-Goldwyn-Mayer Pictures; Nickelodeon Movies; Columbia Pictures; Robert Simonds Productions
- Distributed by: Paramount Pictures (United States and Canada); Sony Pictures Releasing International (International)
- Release date: November 23, 2005
- Running time: 88 minutes
- Country: United States
- Language: English
- Budget: $45 million
- Box office: $72.7 million

Yours, Mine & Ours is a 2005 American family comedy film directed by Raja Gosnell and starring Dennis Quaid, Rene Russo, Rip Torn, and Linda Hunt. It is a remake of the 1968 film of the same name.

The film follows a blended family with 18 children, who try to end the marriage between the two parents.

Yours, Mine & Ours was released by Paramount Pictures in the United States and by Sony Pictures Releasing International in international markets on November 23, 2005. It received negative reviews from critics and grossed $72.7 million against a $45 million budget.

== Plot ==
Widowed U.S. Coast Guard Rear Admiral Frank Beardsley moves back to his hometown of New London, Connecticut, with his eight children from his first marriage. After he and Helen North, a widowed handbag designer by trade with 10 children (four biological, six adopted), unexpectedly encounter each other at a restaurant while on separate dates, they do so again at their 30-year high school reunion.

Instantly rekindling their old spark, Frank and Helen quickly decide to marry in a private ceremony, shocking both sets of children. They move into a new home on the same property where they shared their first kiss, joined by the North children's numerous pets (including a pot-bellied pig), and Frank's housekeeper, Mrs. Munion.

It soon becomes apparent that Frank's very regimented way of doing things clashes with Helen's more free-spirited, laissez-faire attitude. Their respective children, shocked by the news of their quick wedding, initially do not get along well. They even turn a planned lighthouse renovation project into an all-out paint fight.

Frank's oldest son, William, calls a meeting with his siblings. He explains they can rid themselves of their new situation by joining forces to make Frank and Helen's respective philosophical differences apparent, which will cause them to fight. However, while doing so, they gradually begin to bond, attending their siblings' soccer games and helping William in his class president campaign.

A short time later, Frank and Helen attend a formal Coast Guard dinner where his superior, Commandant Sherman, officially offers him the opportunity to be his successor. He respectfully declines, citing both his obligation to the Coast Guard Academy and his new family. Meanwhile, as the young children have a food fight upstairs in the bedroom, the older ones throw a big wild party downstairs, which quickly grows uncontrollable.

When Frank and Helen return to find their place in total chaos, Frank is furious. And, while also upset, Helen's more laidback approach only angers him more. This causes their worst fight yet, and the children, realizing how happy Frank and Helen have been together, begin to recognize that they might have pushed things too far.

The next day, Frank informs Helen that he has decided to take the position as Commandant after all, and they schedule a family meeting to inform the children. As they return home from school, jubilant over having defended their younger siblings from bullies and with the news of William having won the class election, Frank quickly deflates their mood by announcing his decision to accept the new position. Feeling guilty for having torn him and Helen apart, they set about undoing their mistakes, with the younger children enlisting Helen to aid in their efforts.

Together, the older children launch the family's boat in an effort to intercept Frank (thereby fulfilling his previous dream of having an all-family sailing team that failed earlier). However, he is convinced that Helen no longer wants to be with him, until he sees her turn on the lighthouse spotlight (referencing a story he had told her earlier about a beautiful female lighthouse keeper). Successfully reunited, they marry once again, this time with the children involved.

== Cast ==
- Dennis Quaid as Admiral Franklin "Frank" Beardsley, the patriarch of the Beardsley Family and Helen's second husband
- Rene Russo as Helen North, the matriarch of the North Family and Frank's second wife
- Rip Torn as Admiral Sherman, Commandant of the Coast Guard
- Linda Hunt as Mrs. Munion
- Jerry O'Connell as Maxwell "Max" Algrant
- David Koechner as Captain Darrell Edwards
- Jenica Bergere as Claudia
- Josh Henderson as Nick De Pietro
- Dan Mott as Pizza Delivery Guy

The Beardsley Children

- Sean Faris as William Beardsley, Frank's first son
- Katija Pevec as Christina Beardsley, Frank's first daughter
- Dean Collins as Harrison "Harry" Beardsley, Frank's second son
- Tyler Patrick Jones as Michael Beardsley, Frank's third son
- Haley Ramm as Kelly Beardsley, Frank's second daughter
- Brecken Palmer as Ely Beardsley, Frank's fourth son and Otter's identical twin brother
- Bridger Palmer as Otter Beardsley, Frank's fifth son and Ely's identical twin brother
- Ty Panitz as Ethan Beardsley, Frank's sixth son

The North Children

- Drake Bell as Dylan North, Helen's first son
- Danielle Panabaker as Phoebe North, Helen's first daughter
- Lil' JJ as Jimi North, Helen's adoptive second son
- Miki Ishikawa as Naoko North, Helen's adoptive second daughter
- Miranda Cosgrove as Joni North, Helen's third daughter
- Slade Pearce as Mick North, Helen's third son
- Andrew Vo as Lau North, Helen's adoptive fourth son
- Jennifer Habib as Bina North, Helen's adoptive fourth daughter and Marisa's identical twin sister
- Jessica Habib as Marisa North, Helen's adoptive fifth daughter and Bina's identical twin sister
- Nicholas Roget-King as Aldo North, Helen's adoptive fifth son

== Production ==
In April 2003, it was reported MGM and Paramount Pictures would be co-producing a remake of the 1968 film Yours, Mine and Ours with Bob Hilgenberg and Rob Muir slated to write the script. By February 2005, Raja Gosnell was set to direct with Dennis Quaid and Rene Russo as the leads. The film was fast-tracked for a Holiday 2005 release date in the hopes it would duplicate the success of 2003's Cheaper by the Dozen which was also produced by Robert Simonds and executive produced by Tracey Trench.

== Release ==
=== Promotion ===
Dennis Quaid and some of the child actors appeared on the November 22, 2005 episode of Dr. Phil to promote the film.

=== Box office ===
The film opened at number three behind Harry Potter and the Goblet of Fire and Walk the Line, with an opening weekend of $17.5 million in the US. Its final North American box office was $53.4 million and its international box office was $19.3 million, earning a combined total of $72.7 million, against its $45 million production budget.

== Reception ==
On the review aggregator website Rotten Tomatoes, 6% of 106 critics' reviews are positive, with an average rating of 3.4/10. The website's consensus reads: "The initial set-up is unbelievable, the plotting is predictable and stale, and the comedy depends on repetitive pratfalls that soon get old." Metacritic, which uses a weighted average, assigned the film a score of 38 out of 100, based on 25 critics, indicating "generally unfavorable" reviews. Audiences polled by CinemaScore gave it an average grade of "A−" on an A+ to F scale.

== Soundtrack ==
Hawk Nelson performed a song featuring Drake Bell, titled "Bring Em' Out", as the film's main theme song. The group itself performs during the party sequence.

== Home media ==
Yours, Mine & Ours was released on VHS and DVD on February 28, 2006, by Paramount Home Entertainment, with the former being one of the last films to ever be released in the format. A Blu-ray release followed on February 2, 2021.

== See also ==
- Cheaper by the Dozen (2003 film)
