= Harpers Bizarre =

American sunshine pop band

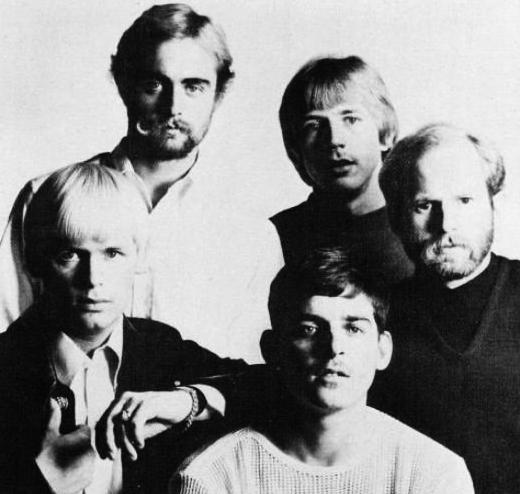
- Harpers Bizarre in 1967

Background information
- Origin: Santa Cruz, California, United States
- Genres: Sunshine pop, baroque pop
- Years active: 1967–1970; 1976
- Labels: Warner Bros., Forest Bay, Sundazed
- Past members: Ted Templeman; Dick Scoppettone; Tom Sowell; Eddie James; Dick Yount (d. 2019); John Petersen (d. 2007)

Harpers Bizarre was an American sunshine pop band of the 1960s, best known for their Broadway/sunshine pop sound and their cover of Simon & Garfunkel's "The 59th Street Bridge Song (Feelin' Groovy)."

== Career ==
Harpers Bizarre formed in Santa Cruz, California, initially called The Tikis (Note: not to be confused with "[Len Wade and] The Tikis", a garage rock band from Alabama https://www.bsnpubs.com/florida/dial/dial.html) which had some local successes with Beatlesque songs in the mid-1960s. The Tikis had been signed to Tom Donahue's Autumn Records from 1965 to 1966 and had released two singles on that label. In 1967, record producer Lenny Waronker got hold of the Simon & Garfunkel song "The 59th Street Bridge Song (Feelin' Groovy)," determined to make it into a hit single. The Tikis recorded it using an arrangement created by Leon Russell, featuring extended harmonies reminiscent of the work of Brian Wilson or the Swingle Singers. The song was released under a new band name, "Harpers Bizarre" (a play on the magazine Harper's Bazaar), so as not to alienate the Tikis' fanbase. The Harpers Bizarre version of the song reached No. 13 on the US Billboard Hot 100 chart in April 1967, far exceeding any success that the Tikis thus far had. The track reached No. 34 on the UK Singles Chart.

The success of the single prompted Harpers Bizarre to record their debut album. At this point, the band consisted of Ted Templeman (vocals, drums, guitar), Dick Scoppettone (vocals, guitar, bass), Eddie James (guitar), Dick Yount (bass, vocals), and John Petersen (drums, percussion, vocals). Petersen had previously already enjoyed a brief spell of success as a member of the Beau Brummels; James left after the release of the group's second album and was replaced by Tom Sowell. Under the guidance of producer Lenny Waronker (and Templeman, who emerged as the leader of the group), Harpers Bizarre developed a unique sound which experimented with heavy vocal layering. Most of Harpers Bizarre's recordings are cheerful and airy, both in subject matter and musical accompaniment, often with string and woodwind arrangements. Their music is most closely associated with the sunshine pop and baroque pop genres.

In addition to covering several old standards (including Cole Porter's "Anything Goes" and Glenn Miller's "Chattanooga Choo Choo"), Harpers Bizarre also recorded the work of several contemporary songwriters, Randy Newman, Van Dyke Parks and Harry Nilsson, who also appear on their recordings in the guise of session musicians or arrangers. Neither Randy Newman, Van Dyke Parks, nor Harry Nilsson were ever members of the Tikis or Harpers Bizarre. One of their recordings was the mildly controversial Randy Newman number "The Biggest Night of Her Life", about a schoolgirl who is "too excited to sleep" because she has promised to lose her virginity on her sixteenth birthday to a boy, whom her parents like "because his hair is always neat".

After the band's initial chart ascendancy with "The 59th Street Bridge Song (Feelin' Groovy)", none of Harpers Bizarre's subsequent singles achieved the same level of success. "Chattanooga Choo Choo" did reach No. 1 on Billboard's Easy Listening chart, despite a drug reference ("do another number down in Carolina"). The band broke up shortly after their last album was released in 1969. Templeman has stated that they broke up over whether to continue with their producer: "Well, the lowdown was that the rest of the band didn't want Lenny to produce us anymore, but I did. So, it was me against them. (Laughs) And that was it."

In 1967, they contributed the title song for the short-lived ABC-TV series Malibu U, starring Ricky Nelson. Their music can also be heard in the 1968 film I Love You, Alice B. Toklas, and their recording of "Anything Goes" underscores the opening montage of 1970's The Boys in the Band.

On October 31, 1969, while returning to San Francisco after playing a concert in Pasadena, California, the group's TWA flight was hijacked. All the passengers were safely released in Denver, Colorado. However, the plane and its crew continued to Rome, Italy, where the hijacker was apprehended. This incident covered 6,900 miles, the longest distance ever covered in an airplane hijacking incident. Scoppettone later described the hijack as "the best publicity we ever had, by a mile".

Also in 1969, they were guests on NBC's The Spring Thing, a musical television special hosted by Bobbie Gentry and Noel Harrison. Other guests included were Goldie Hawn, Meredith MacRae, Irwin C. Watson, Rod McKuen, and Shirley Bassey.

Ted Templeman became a music producer for several established artists, including Van Morrison, Bette Midler, and Carly Simon, and he helped launch the careers of a number of new artists, like The Doobie Brothers, Nicolette Larson, Montrose, and Van Halen.

In 1976, a partial reunion of the group occurred (without Templeman) to record an album, As Time Goes By.

Drummer John Petersen, husband of Templeman's sister Roberta, died suddenly on November 11, 2007 of a heart attack. Dick Yount died in March 2019.

== Discography ==
=== Albums ===
- Feelin' Groovy (Warner Bros., 1967)
- Anything Goes (Warner Bros., 1967)
- The Secret Life of Harpers Bizarre (Warner Bros., 1968)
- Harpers Bizarre 4 (Warner Bros., 1969)
- As Time Goes By (Forest Bay, 1976)
- Feelin' Groovy: The Best of Harpers Bizarre (Warner Archives, 1997)
- The Complete Singles Collection (1965–1970) (Now Sounds, 2016)

The Big Beat Records compilation albums Dance with Me: The Autumn Teen Sound (1994) and Someone to Love: The Birth of the San Francisco Sound (1996) contain the Tikis' two 45s and several previously unreleased recordings.

=== Singles ===
Year	Single (A-side, B-side) Both sides from same album except where indicated	Chart positions			Album
Year	Single (A-side, B-side) Both sides from same album except where indicated	US	US AC	UK	Album
1965	"If I've Been Dreaming" b/w "Pay Attention to Me"				Non-album tracks
1966	"Lost My Love Today" b/w "Bye Bye Bye"				Non-album tracks
Above two singles shown as by The Tikis
1967	"The 59th Street Bridge Song (Feelin' Groovy)" b/w "Lost My Love Today" (Non-album track)	13	4	34	Feelin' Groovy
1967	"Come to the Sunshine" b/w "The Debutante's Ball"	37			Feelin' Groovy
1967	"Anything Goes" b/w "Malibu U." (Non-album track)	43	6	33	Anything Goes
1967	"Chattanooga Choo Choo" b/w "Hey, You in the Crowd"	45	1		Anything Goes
1968	"Cotton Candy Sandman" b/w "Virginia City" (from Anything Goes)				Harpers Bizarre 4
1968	"Both Sides Now" b/w "Small Talk"	123	38		Non-album tracks
1968	"Battle of New Orleans" b/w "Green Apple Tree"	95	21		The Secret Life of Harpers Bizarre
1968	"I Love You, Alice B. Toklas!" b/w "Look to the Rainbow" (from The Secret Life of Harpers Bizarre)				Harpers Bizarre 4
1969	"Knock on Wood" b/w "Witchi Tai To"				Harpers Bizarre 4
1970	"Poly High" b/w "Soft Soundin' Music" (from Harpers Bizarre 4)				Non-album track
1970	"Anything Goes" b/w "Virginia City"				Anything Goes
1970	"If We Ever Needed the Lord Before" b/w "Mad" (from The Secret Life of Harpers Bizarre)				Non-album tracks
1972	"Poly High" b/w "Knock on Wood" (from Harpers Bizarre 4)				Non-album tracks
1976	"Down at Papa Joe's" b/w "As Time Goes By"				As Time Goes By
1976	"You Gotta Make Your Own Sunshine" b/w "Young Love"				Non-album tracks
1976	"Say Goodbye to 18 Yellow Roses" b/w "It's All Over Now"				Non-album tracks
1973	"The 59th Street Bridge Song (Feelin' Groovy)" (UK chart reentry) b/w "Anything Goes" and "Chattanooga Choo Choo" (both from Anything Goes)			52	Feelin' Groovy
