= Yours, Mine and Ours (1968 film) =

1968 film by Melville Shavelson

- Theatrical release by Frank Frazetta
- Directed by: Melville Shavelson
- Screenplay by: Mort Lachman; Melville Shavelson
- Story by: Bob Carroll Jr. Madelyn Davis
- Based on: Who Gets the Drumstick; 1965 novel by Helen Beardsley
- Produced by: Robert F. Blumofe
- Starring: Lucille Ball; Henry Fonda; Van Johnson; Tom Bosley
- Cinematography: Charles F. Wheeler
- Edited by: Stuart Gilmore
- Music by: Fred Karlin
- Production companies: Desilu Productions; Walden Productions
- Distributed by: United Artists
- Release date: April 24, 1968
- Running time: 111 minutes
- Country: United States
- Language: English
- Budget: $2.5 million
- Box office: $25.9 million

Yours, Mine and Ours is a 1968 American family comedy drama film directed by Melville Shavelson. The film stars Lucille Ball, Henry Fonda and Van Johnson.

Yours, Mine and Ours was released in the United States on April 24, 1968, by United Artists. The film received mixed reviews from critics, but was commercially successful. A remake was released in 2005.

== Plot ==
Frank Beardsley is a Navy Chief Warrant Officer, recently detached from the aircraft carrier USS Enterprise and assigned as project officer for the Fresnel lens glide-slope indicator, or "meatball", that would eventually become standard equipment on all carriers. Helen North is a civilian nurse working in the dispensary at NAS Alameda, the California U.S. Navy base to which Frank is assigned.

Frank meets Helen, first by chance in the commissary on the base and again when Frank brings his distraught teenage daughter for treatment at the dispensary, where Helen informs him that the young lady is simply growing up in a crowded house which lacks a mother's guidance. They immediately hit it off and go on a date, all the while shying away from admitting their respective secrets: Frank has ten children and Helen has eight, from previous marriages ended by their spouses' deaths.

When both of them finally learn about the other's secret, they initially resist their mutual attraction. However, Chief Warrant Officer Darrell Harrison is determined to bring them together, so he "fixes up" each of them with a sure-to-be-incompatible blind date. Helen's date is an obstetrician who stands a good head shorter than her ("Darrell had a malicious sense of humor", Helen observes in a voice-over). Frank's date is a "hip" girl who is not only young enough to be his daughter, but is also far too forward for his taste. As the final touch, Harrison makes sure that both dates take place in the same Japanese restaurant. As Harrison fully expects, Frank and Helen end up leaving the restaurant together in his car, with Frank's date sitting uncomfortably between them as they carry on about their children.

Frank and Helen continue to date regularly, and he eventually invites her to dinner in his home. This nearly turns disastrous when Mike, Rusty and Greg, Frank's three sons, mix large doses of gin, scotch and vodka into Helen's drink. As a result, Helen's behavior turns wild and embarrassing, which Frank cannot comprehend until he catches his sons trying to conceal their laughter. "The court of inquiry is now in session!" he declares, and gets the three to own up and apologize. After this, he announces his intention to marry Helen, adding, "And nobody put anything into my drink".

Most of the children oppose the marriage at first, regarding each other and their respective stepparents with suspicion. However, the 18 children eventually bond into one large blended family which is about to increase because Helen becomes pregnant. Matters are also complicated by Frank leaving for several weeks on a shakedown cruise.

Further tension develops between young Phillip North and his teacher at the parochial school that he attends. His teacher insists that he use his "legal" name, which remains North even after his mother marries Beardsley. This prompts Helen and Frank to discuss cross-adopting each other's children, who (except for Phillip) are shocked at the notion of "reburying" their deceased biological parents. The subsequent birth of Joseph John Beardsley finally unites the children, who agree unanimously to adoption under a common surname of Beardsley.

Just before the baby is born, however, the eldest sibling, Mike Beardsley, receives a draft notice. Rather than take his chances, he decides to join the United States Marine Corps. The film ends with Mike going off to Camp Pendleton.

== Cast ==
- Lucille Ball as Helen North-Beardsley
- Henry Fonda as Frank Beardsley
- Van Johnson as CWO Darrell Harrison
- Louise Troy as Madeleine Love, Frank's date
- Sidney Miller as Dr. Ashford, Helen's date
- Tom Bosley as a family doctor who makes a house call on the Beardsleys, and is also the consulting physician for the California Draft Board when Mike Beardsley reports for a required physical exam
- Nancy Howard as Nancy Beardsley, Howard's wife and Frank's sister-in-law
- Walter Brooke as Howard Beardsley, Frank's younger brother
- Ben Murphy as Larry, Colleen's boyfriend
- Ysabel MacCloskey as housekeeper #1, who lasts less than a day
- Pauline Hague as housekeeper #2 a.k.a. Mrs. Anderson. She lasts a week because she is hiding from the police. After a stint with the Beardsleys, she turns herself in.
- Marjorie Eaton as housekeeper #3 aka Mrs. Ferguson, who famously says, "Mrs. Anderson was last week; I'm Mrs. Ferguson, and you can mail me my check!" She fights Louise precipitating Frank's second meeting with Helen.
- Jennifer Gan (credited as Ginny Gan) as young lady in coffeehouse
- Mary Gregory as Sister Mary Alice, who questions Phillip's use of the Beardsley name
- Larry Hankin as supermarket clerk
- Harry Holcombe as the judge who handles the grand mutual adoption

The Beardsley children

- Tim Matheson (credited as Tim Matthieson) as Mike, Frank's first son
- Gil Rogers as Rusty, Frank's second son
- Nancy Roth as Rosemary, Frank's first daughter
- Gary Goetzman as Greg, Frank's third son
- Morgan Brittany (credited as Suzanne Cupito) as Louise, Frank's second daughter
- Holly O'Brien as Susan, Frank's fourth daughter
- Michele Tobin as Veronica, Frank's fifth daughter
- Maralee Foster as Mary, Frank's third daughter
- Tracy Nelson as Germaine, Frank's sixth daughter
- Stephanie Oliver as Joan, Frank's seventh daughter

The North children

- Jennifer Leak as Colleen, Helen's first daughter
- Kevin Burchett as Nicky, Helen's first son
- Kimberly Beck as Janette, Helen's second daughter
- Mitch Vogel as Tommy, Helen's second son
- Margot Jane as Jean, Helen's third daughter
- Eric Shea as Phillip, Helen's third son
- Greg Atkins as Gerald, Helen's fourth son
- Lynnell Atkins as Teresa, Helen's fourth daughter

== Production ==
Henry Fonda and Lucille Ball take turns providing voice-over narration throughout the film, and in at least one scene, Van Johnson talks directly to the camera, as does Henry Fonda in one scene.

Lucille Ball portraying Helen Beardsley was never in doubt. However, a long line of distinguished actors came under consideration, at one time or another, for the role of Frank Beardsley. They included Desi Arnaz, James Stewart, Fred MacMurray, Jackie Gleason, Art Carney, and John Wayne. Henry Fonda finally accepted, and indeed asked for, the role in a telephone conversation with Robert F. Blumofe in 1967. Ball, who had worked with Fonda before in the 1942 release The Big Street, readily agreed to the casting.

One account says Ball recalled in 1961 that Desilu Productions first bought the rights to the Beardsley-North story in 1959, even before Helen Beardsley published her biography, but this is highly unlikely because Frank and Helen Beardsley married on September 6, 1961, and their first spouses were both alive in 1959. It is more likely that Bob Carroll and his wife brought the story of the Beardsley family to Ball's attention after reading it in a local newspaper. However, Mr. Carroll is said to recall his wife mentioning the story in 1960, a full year before the Beardsleys were married and probably when Dick North was still alive. In any event, Desilu Productions did secure the rights early on, and Mr. Carroll and Madelyn Pugh instantly began to write a script.

Production suffered multiple interruptions for several reasons. It began in December 1962 after Ball's abortive attempt at a career on the Broadway stage. In 1963, production was halted after the box-office failure of her comedy effort Critic's Choice (with Bob Hope). She was also unhappy with the script presented by Madelyn Pugh (then known as Madelyn Pugh Martin) and Bob Carroll, precisely because their script overly resembled an I Love Lucy television episode, and commissioned another writer (Leonard Spigelgass) to rewrite it. Mr. Spigelgass does not seem to have succeeded in breaking free of Lucy's television work, so producer Robert Blumofe hired two more writers (Mickey Rudin and Bernie Weitzman) to make an attempt. When this failed, Blumofe hired Melville Shavelson, who eventually directed. All further rewrite efforts came to an abrupt end at the insistence of United Artists, the film's eventual distributor.

At this point in the production cycle, Helen Beardsley's book Who Gets the Drumstick? was actually released in 1965. Like many film adaptations, exactly how much the book informed the final shooting script is impossible to determine.

Production began in 1967 with Henry Fonda signed on to portray Frank. Mort Lachman, who had been one of Bob Hope's writers, joined the writing team at the recommendation of Shavelson. Leonard Spigelgass received no on-screen writing credit for his efforts in this film.

Filming was done largely on-location in Alameda and San Francisco, California with Mike's high-school graduation being filmed at Grant High School in southern California (Frank Beardsley's home, into which the blended family eventually moved, was in Carmel). The total budget is estimated at $2.5 million (equivalent to $23.1 million in 2025), including $1,700,000 for actual filming and post-production.

== Reception ==
The film received mediocre reviews. The film holds a 57% approval rating with 12 reviews from critics on Rotten Tomatoes. Roger Ebert gave the film 3.5 out of 4 stars and praised the performances of Ball and Fonda.

It was a massive commercial success, earning nearly $26 million ($182 Million adjusted for inflation) at the box office (on a tight budget of $2.5 million) and earning over $11 million in rentals.

Frank Beardsley stated his family enjoyed the film as general entertainment, and acknowledged that perhaps the scriptwriters felt their screenplay was "a better story" than the truth.

== Home media ==
Yours, Mine and Ours was released on VHS by MGM/UA Home Video in 1989, 1994, and 1998. A Laserdisc version was released in 1994, featuring noise reduction applied to the film soundtrack.

It was released to DVD on March 6, 2001. While the DVD was released in full frame, the original film was a widescreen release in the 1.78:1 aspect ratio. This, therefore, constitutes an open matte presentation.

It was released on Blu-ray on September 13, 2016 through Olive Films (under license from MGM and 20th Century Fox Home Entertainment). The sole special feature is the original movie trailer.

== Awards and nominations ==
Award	Category	Nominee(s)	Result
Golden Globe Awards	Best Motion Picture – Musical or Comedy		Nominated
Golden Globe Awards	Best Actress in a Motion Picture – Musical or Comedy	Lucille Ball	Nominated
Laurel Awards	Top General Entertainment		Won
Laurel Awards	Top Male Comedy Performance	Henry Fonda	3rd Place
Laurel Awards	Top Female Comedy Performance	Lucille Ball	Won
Writers Guild of America Awards	Best Written American Comedy	Melville Shavelson and Mort Lachman; Bob Carroll Jr. and Madelyn Davis	Nominated

== See also ==
- List of American films of 1968
- The Brady Bunch
- Cheaper by the Dozen (1950 film)
