= Helen Beardsley =

American writer (1930–2000)

Helen Eileen Beardsley (née Brandmeir, formerly North; April 5, 1930 – April 26, 2000) was the mother of a noted blended family of twenty children — eight by her first marriage to Richard North, ten stepchildren from her second husband Frank Beardsley, and two that she and Frank had during their marriage. She wrote a book, Who Gets the Drumstick?, about her blended family's experiences.

The book was the basis for two motion pictures: the 1968 film, Yours, Mine and Ours, starring Lucille Ball and Henry Fonda; and the 2005 remake of the same name, starring Rene Russo and Dennis Quaid.

== Biography ==
Helen Eileen Brandmeir was born in 1930 in Seattle, Washington. Her father owned a lumber mill, which came under severe stress during the Great Depression. Helen would later describe how her observations of her father would shape her personality, and in particular how it would teach her to value independence and problem-solving.

Brandmeir trained as a nurse in Seattle. In 1949 at age 19 she married Richard North, then a chief petty officer in the United States Navy. Their marriage lasted for eleven years and produced eight children. In 1960, the Norths were stationed at Naval Air Station Whidbey Island, Washington, and Helen was six months pregnant with their eighth child, Teresa Rose. Now a lieutenant, junior grade and A-3 Skywarrior bombardier navigator, North was killed on June 7, 1960, when the A-3 he was flying veered off the runway during takeoff at NAS Whidbey Island/Ault Field and crashed in 5 1/2 feet of water.

Following Teresa's August 1960 birth in Oak Harbor, Washington, North relocated to San Leandro, California. On September 9, 1961, she married her second husband, Chief Warrant Officer Francis Louis "Frank" Beardsley, USN, who at the time served as Personnel Officer at the Naval Postgraduate School in Monterey, California.

A widower, Frank Beardsley brought 10 children from his first marriage; combined with Helen's eight children the newlyweds had 18 children. During the marriage the Beardsleys had two children of their own. In 1964, they legally adopted each other's children. Although Helen claimed in her book that the children unanimously agreed with the decision to change their names from North to Beardsley, five of them changed their names back as adults. The huge resulting family sparked nationwide interest in the Beardsleys, especially on how Frank and Helen handled the day-to-day logistics of raising such a large family. Media coverage and attention followed the family. The Beardsleys landed some celebrity endorsement contracts, and they sold the rights to their story to Desilu Productions. Desilu then produced the first of the two films based on the Beardsley's courtship, marriage, and combined large family.

Beardsley appeared as herself on the October 11, 1965 episode of the CBS television game show To Tell the Truth, receiving two of the four votes. The family would also appear on The Tonight Show Starring Johnny Carson. According to Kermit Schafer, the noted author of many books on television bloopers, a member of the audience on The Tonight Show provided a classic quip when the Beardsleys appeared on the show with all those children. The family had just left the stage, and the show had cut to a commercial break. Johnny Carson was in awe of the huge family and he said, "I have only three kids. I don't know how they do it." Someone in the seats stood up and hollered, "Oh, yes, you do!"

After 30 years in the Navy, Frank Beardsley retired in 1966. Looking to buy a business, in 1968 he bought a nut and candy store named Morrow's Nut House in Monterey, California.

Frank Beardsley operated the business with the help of the older children, including two sons who had returned from active duty in the Marines. At the time, Helen served on then-Governor Ronald Reagan's Advisory Council on the Status of Women. Later, the family owned three bakeries.

Frank and Helen Beardsley's marriage lasted for 30 years, until she left him when her health began to fail. She died in Healdsburg, California, on April 26, 2000, aged 70, from Parkinson's disease and a stroke. Frank Beardsley later remarried. He died on December 11, 2012, at 97. In 2013, Helen’s son Thomas North published a book in which he accused his adoptive father of being physically and emotionally abusive.
