= Malibu U =

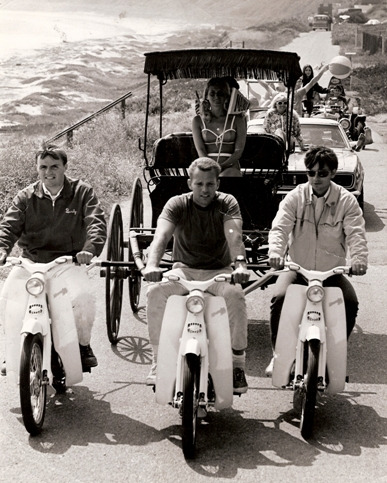
- Promotional shot from Malibu U
- Genre: Variety show
- Written by: Milt Larsen; Bob Lauher
- Directed by: Jack Shea
- Starring: Ricky Nelson; Robie Porter
- Theme music composer: Dick Addrisi; Don Addrisi
- Opening theme: Performed by Harpers Bizarre
- Country of origin: United States
- Original language: English
- No. of seasons: 1
- No. of episodes: 7

Production
- Executive producer: Gene McCabe
- Producer: Al Burton
- Running time: 25 min.
- Production companies: Four Star Television; Robert E. Petersen Productions; Teen-Age Fair Inc.

Original release
- Network: ABC
- Release: July 21 – September 1, 1967

Malibu U is an American variety show that aired in the summer of 1967 on ABC. The series starred Ricky Nelson, and aired on Friday evenings from 8:30 to 9:00 p.m.

== Overview ==
In the series, Nelson starred as the "Dean of the Drop-Ins" of a fictional college called Malibu U. Regulars included Robie Porter as "President of the Student Body" and the Mali-beauties dancers.

In each episode three well-known performers, called Visiting Professors, sang. Two of the performers were filmed on the beach, and the third was filmed in another unusual location. On the July 28, 1967 episode Leonard Nimoy sang the novelty song "The Ballad of Bilbo Baggins". Other guest stars included Annette Funicello, Don Ho and The Four Seasons with Frankie Valli.

Some of the classes taught at Malibu U were surfing and sunbathing. A newspaper article stated that the series would "present the new fads, fashions and foibles of the young world."

== Episode list ==
1. July 21: guest stars Frankie Valli, Don Ho, Annette Funicello
2. July 28: guest stars Leonard Nimoy, Buffalo Springfield, Engelbert Humperdinck, Bobby Rydell, Mrs. Miller
3. August 4: guest stars James Darren, Harper's Bizarre, Frankie Randall, The Happenings
4. August 11: guest stars The Turtles, Lou Rawls, Lesley Gore, Don and the Goodtimes
5. August 18: guest stars John Astin, The 5th Dimension, The Sunshine Company, Roger Williams
6. August 25: guest stars The Doors, Marvin Gaye, Chad & Jeremy, Lou Christie
7. September 1: guest stars Dionne Warwick, The Breed, Peter and Gordon, Sandy Posey
