= Come to the Sunshine =

- 2013 reissue picture sleeve

Single by Van Dyke Parks
- B-side: "Farther Along"
- Released: September 1966
- Recorded: March 1966
- Genre: Sunshine pop
- Length: 2:52
- Label: MGM
- Songwriter(s): Van Dyke Parks
- Producer(s): Tom Wilson and Tim Alvorado

Van Dyke Parks singles chronology
"Number Nine" (1966)	"Come to the Sunshine" (1966)	"Donovan's Colours, Pt. 1" (1968)

"Come to the Sunshine" is a song written and recorded by Van Dyke Parks and covered by several other artists. It was one of two singles Parks issued through the MGM label in 1966 before moving to Warner Bros. the following year.

== Composition ==
It was composed in the summer of 1965 while Parks was living in the rear apartment at 7222 1/2 Melrose Avenue in Hollywood. The arrangement is characteristically jumbled, featuring multiple overlapping vocals by Parks, as well as a jazzy piano and a busy mandolin. He has said it to have been inspired by Snuff Garrett’s "50 Guitars Go South of the Border" and his father’s Depression-era dance band The White Swan Serenaders. It was written especially for his father, in honor of "what he was doing at the time." Parks added, "I thought that he would think it was very wonderful, and I don't think he thought it was very wonderful."

The lyrics at the time were oblique, atypical for pop music in 1966, and was one of the many songs heralding the imminent 1960s psychedelic era. It signified many things to come for Parks, including his lyrical collaborations with the Beach Boys aborted Smile album and his 1967 solo debut Song Cycle. It was recorded in one day and in just three takes, along with his other singles released on his short tenure with the MGM label. The B-side was "Farther Along", which was in a similar sunshine pop style as "Come to the Sunshine".

Parks has reflected of the song years later, exclaiming "it was a good work! A fine example of plectrum arranging." Record producer and friend Michael Vosse recounted in 1969, "It was completed at least three months before all the other 'Sunshine' records came out—like the Beatles thing ("Good Day Sunshine") and "Sunshine Superman". I mean, it was recorded in March or something and MGM didn't want to put it out until September. Just neglected it. And they did that twice in a row to him."

== Release history ==
The song as it was recorded by Parks in 1966 remained out of print for many years, and is a rare, sought after collector's item. It was included on the 2011 Parks compilation Arrangements, Volume 1, alongside other rarities such as "The Eagle And Me", "Farther Along", "Out On The Rolling Sea When Jesus Speak To Me", and the mono single mix of "Donovan's Colours".

== Covers ==
- 1967 – Warner Bros. sunshine pop group Harpers Bizarre, as the opening track on their debut album, Feelin' Groovy. Parks himself was present on the album's recording sessions, and he plays keyboard on the track. This version reached #37 on the Billboard Hot 100 chart.
- 1967 – The Pleasure Fair
- 1968 – Roberta Lee
- 1968 – The Harpers Bizarre version was used as the basis for a radio advertisement for the Clairol Summer Blond hair lightener which circulated on KHJ-AM Los Angeles and is featured on the soundtrack to the Quentin Tarantino film Once Upon a Time in Hollywood
- 1971 – The Esso Trinidad Steel Band for their album Esso, which was also produced by Parks and contains guest vocals by him.
- 1975 – Brian Wilson recorded the song with Parks' participation. It was intended for inclusion on the Beach Boys' 15 Big Ones (1976), but the master tape was lost.

== Personnel ==
- Van Dyke Parks – writer, main performer, keyboards
- The Wrecking Crew – other instrumentation
