= Lenny Waronker =

American record producer and music executive

- Born: Leonard Waronker; October 3, 1941 (age 84); Los Angeles, California, United States
- Education: University of Southern California
- Occupations: Music industry executive Producer
- Board member of: USC Thornton School of Music
- Children: Joey Waronker; Anna Waronker; Katie Waronker; Lily Waronker; Grace Waronker
- Parent(s): Simon Waronker; Jeanette Waronker

Lenny Waronker (born October 3, 1941) is an American record producer and music industry executive. As the president of Warner Bros. Records, and later, as the co-founder and co-chair of DreamWorks Records, Waronker was noted for his commitment to artists and his belief that "music, not money, was still number one." In 2025, he was inducted into the Rock and Roll Hall of Fame.

== Early life ==
Waronker was born in 1941 in Los Angeles, California and grew up in Pacific Palisades, California. His father, Simon Waronker, a classical violinist, performed with the 20th Century Fox Orchestra from 1936 through 1939, and served as the orchestra's contractor at the studio from 1939 to 1955. When Waronker was 13, his father founded Liberty Records, which became one of the most successful independent labels of the post-World War II period.

Liberty's first release was an orchestral composition entitled "The Girl Upstairs" by Lionel Newman. Newman's nephew Randy Newman and Waronker, were close friends. They frequently visited the Liberty Records office, where they would watch recording sessions and study studio personnel. Waronker had little interest in becoming a musician, and gravitated instead towards production. In a 1994 interview with Billboard, he said: "I remember going to Randy's house and saying 'why don't we figure out the arrangement for some standard?' " Billboard.

== Career ==
=== Liberty Records, Metric ===
At his father's urging, Waronker – by then educated in songwriting, the music industry, and publishing – attended USC, where he studied music and business. As he had in high school, Waronker worked in the A&R department at Liberty during summer breaks. Notably, in addition to serving as a gofer, Waronker worked with staff producer Snuff Garrett. Garrett, who was legendary for his "shrewd ability to identify a good song and know what singer could do it justice" influenced Waronker as he learned about production.

Waronker was additionally exposed to songwriters including Burt Bacharach, Mort Shuman, Carole King, Gerry Goffin, Barry Mann, Cynthia Weil, and Doc Pomus.

After his college graduation in 1961, Waronker was employed by Liberty full-time, working in the label's promotion department. A year later, he transferred to Liberty's publishing arm, Metric Music, where he worked for Mike Gould and, briefly, as an assistant to Tommy LiPuma. At Metric, Waronker produced song demos; out of a fear that the producers would "mess up the song or the arrangement", Waronker learned how to make the demos sound like fully produced records with limited funds, and how to take advantage of "moments within a song".

At Metric, Waronker pitched songs to Dick Glasser at Warner Bros. and Jimmy Bowen at Reprise. Impressed by his song demos, Bowen and Glasser recommended Waronker to Reprise label president Mo Ostin. Ostin subsequently hired him as a junior A&R representative for Reprise and for Warner Bros., which was then run by Joe Smith. Charged with developing artists who were originally on the roster of Autumn Records, a defunct label Reprise had acquired, Waronker produced the Mojo Men's "Sit Down, I Think I Love You," hiring Newman on piano and Van Dyke Parks as an arranger. He also produced Harpers Bizarre's "The 59th Street Bridge Song (Feelin' Groovy)," which he hired Leon Russell to arrange. Both songs were hits.

=== Warner/Reprise, relationship with Mo Ostin, head of A&R ===
At the time, Warner/Reprise was characterized by a roster which included Dean Martin, Frank Sinatra, Petula Clark, Peter, Paul & Mary, and Sonny and Cher. The perception of the label shifted as Ostin and Smith signed artists including Jimi Hendrix, The Kinks, the Grateful Dead, and Van Morrison, among many others, and Waronker signed and/or produced artists including Newman, the Beau Brummels, James Taylor, Arlo Guthrie, Van Dyke Parks, Ry Cooder, Gordon Lightfoot, and Maria Muldaur.

In 1970 Ostin promoted Waronker to head of A&R. Waronker assembled an A&R staff composed of acclaimed producers and artists including Tommy LiPuma, Ted Templeman, Russ Titelman, Steve Barri, Gary Katz, Michael Omartian and John Cale, and by the early 1980s, Ostin, Smith and Waronker had transformed Warner/Reprise into a label known as a haven for artists. Rickie Lee Jones, who Waronker signed on the strength of a four-song demo, was an example of the success of the Warner Bros. artist-centric philosophy; her debut album, which Waronker co-produced with Titelman, went multi-platinum, and was considered by many to be one of the best debut albums of all time. Although the singles charts at the time was dominated by disco and arena rock anthems, "Chuck E.'s In Love" was a Top 10 hit. Jones won the Grammy for Best New Artist in 1979 and Waronker was nominated for a Grammy in the Record of the Year category for his work as the record's producer. (He was nominated in the same category in 1975 for Maria Muldaur's "Midnight at the Oasis.")

=== President of Warner/Reprise, R.E.M., Prince, resignation from Warner ===
In 1982, Waronker determined that his A&R-focused role was limiting and "becoming tiresome." He went to Ostin, seeking to become more active as an executive at the label. Waronker was subsequently appointed president. Although he remained significantly involved in signing artists, and produced tracks including Rod Stewart's "Broken Arrow" and Eric Clapton's "Forever Man," he reduced the amount of time he spent in the studio, and instead worked closely with Ostin to run Warner/Reprise.

With an emphasis on the quality of the records they released, under the joint leadership of Ostin and Waronker, Warner/Reprise entered a period of substantial commercial success. Although many of the label's artists failed to deliver records in 1983, in 1984, with multi-platinum records from Madonna, John Fogerty, and Prince, among others, the label posted a 51% increase in revenue. Warner/Reprise continued to thrive throughout the 1980s, with releases from R.E.M. and Prince, both of whom Waronker signed, Eric Clapton, Red Hot Chili Peppers, Paul Simon, Madonna, Talking Heads, Van Halen, Neil Young, and Dire Straits, among others. Warner/Reprise was a dominant force in the record industry throughout Waronker's tenure.

In 1992, following the death of Time Warner Chairman Steve Ross, the Chairman of Warner Music Group, Robert J. Morgado, reorganized the corporate management structure. Under Ross, the Warner Music Groups were autonomous; Morgado, described as "a bean counter with little knowledge of music," required that the label heads report to him. Ostin declined to renew his contract as Chairman of Warner/Reprise, and resigned his position in August 1994. Waronker rejected Morgado's offer to succeed Ostin as the chairman of Warner Bros./Reprise. "The way things are right now, it just doesn't feel right," he said.

=== DreamWorks, return to Warner Records ===
In the months following their departure, Ostin and Waronker were pursued by more than a dozen entertainment companies, including Disney, Viacom, Fox, PolyGram and Time Warner. In October it was announced that they would co-chair DreamWorks Records, the newly created music arm of Steven Spielberg, David Geffen, and Jeffrey Katzenberg's DreamWorks. Michael Ostin, Mo's son and a well-regarded A&R executive, was appointed president of the label.

Although he served in a leadership role at DreamWorks, Waronker continued to work closely with artists including Rufus Wainwright, the first artist he signed to DreamWorks, the Eels, Elliott Smith, and Newman, who he brought to the label in 1998. With artists such as Nelly Furtado, Morphine, and Propellerheads, DreamWorks embraced the same artist-first principles that Warner Bros. had become known for, and by 2003 DreamWorks had 59 gold, platinum and multiplatinum sales certifications and 26 Grammy award-winning releases. The label was purchased by Universal Music Group for $100 million, and was subsequently folded into Geffen Records. Waronker left DreamWorks several years later.

In 2010, at the invitation of then-Chairman Tom Whalley, Waronker returned to Warner Bros. as a consultant, and works in partnership with the company's A&R staff on selected projects that have included records by Gary Clark Jr., Kimbra, and Jenny Lewis.

== Personal life ==
Waronker lives in Los Angeles. He was married to Shindig! star Donna Loren, with whom he had three children. His had two children with jewelry designer Cathleen Waronker, his second (and former) wife. His son Joey Waronker is a highly-regarded drummer. He has five grandchildren.

He formerly served on the Board of Councilors of the USC Thornton School of Music.

== Selected discography ==
Year	Album	Artist	Credit	Notable Tracks
2017	Dark Matter	Randy Newman	Producer	
2014	Live	Gary Clark Jr.	A&R	
2014	The Golden Echo	Kimbra	A&R	
2014	The Voyager	Jenny Lewis	A&R	
2012	Black and Blu	Gary Clark Jr.	A&R	
2012	3 Pears	Dwight Yoakam	Executive Producer	
2011	Vows	Kimbra	A&R	
2010	We Walk This Road	Robert Randolph and the Family Band	A&R and Co-producer	
2008	Harps and Angels	Randy Newman	Producer	
2004	Want Two	Rufus Wainwright	A&R	
2003	Want One	Rufus Wainwright	A&R, Executive Producer	
2003	Shootenanny!	The Eels	Executive A&R	
2001	Poses	Rufus Wainwright	Executive Producer	
2001	Souljacker	The Eels	Executive A&R	
2000	Daisies of the Galaxy	The Eels	Executive A&R	
2000	Figure 8	Elliott Smith	Executive A&R	
1998	Electro-Shock Blues	The Eels	Executive A&R	
1998	Rufus Wainwright	Rufus Wainwright	Executive Producer	
1998	XO	Elliott Smith	Executive A&R	
1996	Beautiful Freak	The Eels	Executive A&R	
1992	Little Village	Little Village	Executive Producer	
1991	"Broken Arrow" (single)	Rod Stewart	Producer	"Broken Arrow"
1988	Brian Wilson	Brian Wilson	Executive A&R	
1985	Behind the Sun	Eric Clapton	Executive Producer	"Forever Man"
1983	Hearts and Bones	Paul Simon	Co-Producer	
1983	Trouble in Paradise	Randy Newman	Producer	"I Love L.A."
1982	If That's What It Takes	Michael McDonald	Producer	"I Keep Forgetting"
1982	Shadows	Gordon Lightfoot	Executive Producer	"Shadows"
1981	Pirates	Rickie Lee Jones	Producer	
1981	Ragtime (Music from the Motion Picture)	Randy Newman	Producer	
1980	Dream Street Rose	Gordon Lightfoot	Executive Producer	
1979	Rickie Lee Jones	Rickie Lee Jones	Producer	"Chuck E.'s In Love"
1979	Born Again	Randy Newman	Producer	
1978	Endless Wire	Gordon Lightfoot	Producer	"Endless Wire", "The Circle Is Small"
1977	Little Criminals	Randy Newman	Producer	"Short People"
1976	Amigo	Arlo Guthrie	Producer	
1976	Sweet Harmony	Maria Muldaur	Producer	
1976	In the Pocket	James Taylor	Producer	"Shower the People"
1976	Summertime Dream	Gordon Lightfoot	Producer	"The Wreck of the Edmund Fitzgerald", "Summertime Dream"
1975	Gorilla	James Taylor	Producer	"How Sweet It Is (To Be Loved By You)" "Mexico"
1975	Gord's Gold	Gordon Lightfoot	Producer	"Sundown", "Early Morning Rain"
1975	The Beau Brummels	The Beau Brummels	Audio production	
1975	Cold on the Shoulder	Gordon Lightfoot	Producer	"Now and Then", Bend in the Water"
1974	Maria Muldaur	Maria Muldaur	Producer	"I'm A Woman" "Midnight at the Oasis"
1974	Paradise and Lunch	Ry Cooder	Producer	
1974	Arlo Guthrie	Arlo Guthrie	Producer	
1974	Sundown	Gordon Lightfoot	Producer	"Sundown" "Carefree Highway"
1974	Good Old Boys	Randy Newman	Producer	
1973	The Last of the Brooklyn Cowboys	Arlo Guthrie	Producer	
1972	Sailin’ Shoes	Little Feat	Executive A&R	
1972	Sail Away	Randy Newman	Producer	
1972	Boomer Story	Ry Cooder	Producer	
1972	Don Quixote	Gordon Lightfoot	Producer	"Beautiful", "Alberta Bound"
1972	Hobo's Lullaby	Arlo Guthrie	Producer	"City of New Orleans"
1972	Old Dan's Records	Gordon Lightfoot	Producer	"Hi'way Songs", "Old Dan's Records"
1971	The Doobie Brothers	The Doobie Brothers	Producer	
1971	Into the Purple Valley	Ry Cooder	Producer	
1971	Randy Newman Live	Randy Newman	Producer	
1970	12 Songs	Randy Newman	Producer	
1970	Sit Down Young Stranger	Gordon Lightfoot	Producer	"If You Could Read My Mind" "Minstrel of the Dawn"
1970	Washington County	Arlo Guthrie	Producer	
1970	Ry Cooder	Ry Cooder	Producer	
1969	Harpers Bizarre 4	Harpers Bizarre	Producer	"Witchi Tai To"
1969	Running Down the Road	Arlo Guthrie	Producer	
1968	Bradley's Barn	The Beau Brummels	Producer	
1968	Randy Newman	Randy Newman	Producer	
1968	Roots	The Everly Brothers	Producer	
1968	Secret Life of Harpers Bizarre	Harpers Bizarre	Producer	
1968	Song Cycle	Van Dyke Parks	Producer	
1967	Anything Goes	Harpers Bizarre	Producer	"Anything Goes"
1967	Feelin' Groovy	Harpers Bizarre	Producer	"The 59th Street Bridge Song (Feelin' Groovy)" "Come to the Sunshine"
1967	Triangle	The Beau Brummels	Producer	
1967	"Sit Down, I Think I Love You" (single)	The Mojo Men	Producer	"Sit Down, I Think I Love You"
