= Robert Mersey =

American musician, arranger, and record producer

Robert David Mirsky (April 7, 1917 – December 14, 1994), known as Robert Mersey, was an American musician, arranger, and record producer.

== Life and career ==
In the 1950s, Mersey worked as an arranger with Leiber and Stoller. In 1959, he recorded "Tracy's Theme", an instrumental written by Robert Ascher which was used in a new NBC production of The Philadelphia Story. The production company thought the tune had hit potential, so they worked out a deal with Columbia Records to issue it as a single. However, Mersey was under contract with the new Big Top label as its musical director and had already released a single, "Bittersweet September," on the label. Devon Music, the publishing firm of Talent Associates owned by David Susskind and Howie Richmond at the time, created a fictitious artist named Spencer Ross, and retained ownership of the pseudonym for potential future use. Mersey's recording, under the pseudonym "Spencer Ross", peaked at number 13 on the Billboard Hot 100. After "Tracy's Theme" became a hit, Mersey received permission to use the name Spencer Ross on his next Big Top single, "Theme of a Lonely Evening", but after that, the rights to the Ross name reverted to Devon Music.

Mersey married English lyricist Pam Sawyer in May 1956; they later divorced. From the early 1960s he was employed as an arranger and producer at Columbia Records, where he was responsible for records by singers such as Andy Williams, Barbra Streisand, Bobby Vinton, Dion, Johnny Mathis, Julie Andrews, Mel Tormé, Patti Page and Ray Peterson. In 1960, he conducted the orchestra in the song "Good Timin'", sung by Jimmy Jones. The song also later became a hit for Kyu Sakamoto. He was also responsible for many of Aretha Franklin's early recordings at Columbia, including her 1964 tribute album to Dinah Washington, Unforgettable. According to writer Ursula Rivera, Mersey "was able to provide musical arrangements that highlighted Aretha's unique voice whether she was singing a noisy blues number or a heartbreaking ballad." Mersey also arranged and composed for CBS Television and films, and produced several albums of incidental music, including Great Jazz from Great TV, credited to "Det Moor".

He died in Baltimore, Maryland, at the age of 77.
