= The Friday Afternoon Club =

2024 memoir by Griffin Dunne

- Author: Griffin Dunne
- Audio read by: Griffin Dunne
- Language: English
- Genre: Memoir
- Publisher: Penguin Press
- Publication date: June 11, 2024
- Pages: 400
- ISBN: 0593652827

The Friday Afternoon Club: A Family Memoir is a 2024 memoir by American writer, director and actor Griffin Dunne. It details Dunne's life growing up surrounded by the elite of Hollywood and Manhattan, with the narrative anchored by the eventual murder of his sister, Dominique.

== Summary ==
The Friday Afternoon Club is split into two parts, with the first part covering Dunne's family background and his early years, including schooling and his eventual foray into acting; the second part focuses on the Dunnes' lives following the murder of Dunne's sister, Dominique Dunne. The book opens with a Prologue that details how Ellen "Lenny" Griffin Dunne, Dunne's mother, received a visit from Detective Harold Johnston with news that Dominique had been strangled by a man named John Sweeney.

== Background ==
Dunne belongs to a well-known family in the literary and Hollywood worlds, and he is an actor, director, and producer himself since the late 1970s. Films that he worked on include After Hours, Practical Magic, and the documentary The Center Will Not Hold, which is about his aunt Joan Didion. In the 1980s, Dunne and his younger sister, Dominique, launched their own acting careers and loved to party. Each Friday, Dominique's acting class—including then-fledgling actors George Clooney and Timothy Hutton—gathered until the wee hours in the Dunne back yard as part of the "Friday Afternoon Club." The Friday Afternoon Club is titled after this weekly gathering that the late actress hosted.

== Reception ==
The book was a New York Times Best Seller and was named a Best Book of the Year by Time, NPR, People, Town & Country, and Air Mail. It was reviewed by The Guardian, the Los Angeles Times, The New York Times, The Times, The Washington Post, The Observer, and The Wall Street Journal.

== Release history ==
Release history and formats for The Friday Afternoon Club
Country	Release date	Edition	Publisher	Ref.
Various	June 11, 2024	Hardcover; E-book	Penguin Press	
Various	June 11, 2024	Paperback	Penguin Books	
Various	June 11, 2024	Audiobook	Penguin Audio	

== See also ==
- The Way We Lived Then: Recollections of a Well-Known Name Dropper (1999) – by Dominick Dunne
- Justice: Crimes, Trials, and Punishments (2002) – by Dominick Dunne
- Didion and Babitz (2024) – by Lili Anolik
