= GenArt =

Arts and entertainment organization

Gen Art is an arts and entertainment organization that showcases emerging fashion designers, filmmakers, musicians and visual artists. It has produced over 100 events annually, which included fashion shows, film premieres and screenings, live music and art receptions and tours. Gen Art's offices are located in New York City and Los Angeles and since 2014, the company has been headed up by Keri Rokos and a small team of private investors. Previous offices have included San Francisco, Miami and Chicago.

On February 21, 2011, Gen Art announced it would return with the 16th Annual Gen Art Film Festival in New York City. Gen Art has since then announced its "Fresh Faces in Fashion Show" during New York Fashion Week 2011, which will feature the designers Ann Yee, ace & jig, Sunghee Bang, Eighteenth, Jennifer Chun, William Okopo, Baron Wells, Collina Strada, Falconiere, Osborn, and Wool and the Gang.

== History ==
Gen Art began as a non-profit company, called Generational Arts Limited, by Ian Gerard, Stefan Gerard and Melissa Neumann in 1993. At the same time a for-profit production arm of Gen Art, Generational Art Productions was also launched. Ian was attending New York University Law School at the time. Ian knew that many emerging visual artists from his college experience (Vassar) and elsewhere had difficulty showcasing their talents in the art galleries of New York City. He also noticed that there were a lot of young people with disposable income, who wanted to obtain art but could not afford to buy from the SoHo art galleries. The idea was to bring together these two groups together so they could both benefit.

Gen Art was launched from Ian's law school dorm room at New York University, using just a fax machine and a laptop. Ian's brother Stefan, who worked in publishing, and Melissa Neumann, a 23-year-old analyst at Lehman Brothers, joined the organization. Early on an advisory board of artists, gallery owners and dealers was formed to help establish some credibility within the art community. Then a fundraiser showcasing four emerging artists was organised. This was a success, with 500 people attending and a write up in the New York Times styles section.

The company expanded into fashion in 1995, on the advice of a young accessories designer who had attended one of the art exhibitions. A one night fashion show for emerging fashion designers was held using excess gallery space. A year later Gen Art hired a young film professional, Paul Gachot, to create and direct its first film festival. Around this time Gen Art began to expand, opening an office in Los Angeles in the summer of 1995 and San Francisco in 1996.

Upon graduation in late 1994, Ian started work at a corporate law firm. Stefan became the day-to-day CEO of the company. Stefan quit the company in 1997 and Ian left his law job to work full-time at Gen Art, becoming the CEO. In 1998, Adam Walden was brought in and made the company president.

In the beginning of 2002 when a group of venture capitalists offered to invest in Gen Art, the bulk of the business was moved from the non-profit to the for-profit entity which then took over all responsibilities for corporate sponsorship and production of Gen Art's programming. Gen Art was able to leverage new national partnerships with Heineken and Chrysler to take the company national and Gen Art launched new offices in Miami and Chicago, and centralized the West Coast office oversight in New York.

From 2002 to 2009, Gen Art produced over 100 events in fashion, film, music and art showcasing over 1,000 emerging talent.

In February 2011, Gen Art announced was acquired by publishing company Sandow Media. Under this new umbrella, longtime Gen Art senior executives Elizabeth Shaffer and Jeffrey Abramson were named co-presidents.

As of 2016, Gen Art is currently owned and operated by fashion executive Keri Ingvarsson and a team of private investors.

== GenArt Film Festival ==
The GenArt Film Festival was founded in 1996 to showcase the work of emerging independent filmmakers. The festival's theme programming consists of just seven features and seven shorts and dons the tagline "7 Premieres. 7 Parties". Each night a feature and short is paired, with an after party following the screening.

=== 2013 ===
- Out of Reach Directed by Cyrus Stowe & Tucker Capps
- Emoticon Directed by Livia De Paolis | And After All Directed By Julian Ungano
- A Song Still Inside Directed by Gregory Collins | Joan's Day Out Directed by Ellen Houlihan
- The Warrior and the Savior Directed by Salvatore Sorrentino | Eden Directed By Todd Cobery
- The Discoverers Directed By Justin Schwarz | VARMiNT Directed by Joel Knoernschild
- The Bounceback Directed by Bryan Poser | Top Floor Directed by Aaron David DeFazio
- She Loves Me Not Directed by Brian Jun & Jack Sanderson
- Swim Little Fish Swim Directed by Lola Bessis & Ruben Amar | Young(ish) Directed by Renee Felice Smith
- The Motel Life Directed By Alan & Gabe Polsky | Zero Hour Directed by Dan Carrillo Levy
- Art Machine Directed By Doug Karr

=== 2012 ===
- Missed Connections Directed by Martin Snyder | Old Man Directed by Leah Shore
- Privacy Directed by Jorg Ihle | Rolling on the Floor Laughing Directed by Russell Harbaugh
- The Magic Life Directed by Nelson Chen | Cadaver Directed by Jonah Ansell
- Leave Me Like You Found Me Directed by Adele Romanski | Latch Key Directed by Jaime King
- The Silent Thief Directed by Jennifer Clary | Reform Directed by Jamal Caesar
- Kid-Thing Directed by Nathan and David Zellner | Carbon for Water Directed by Evan Abramson and Carmen Lopez
- The Kitchen Directed by Ishai Setton | Literally, Right Before Aaron Directed by Ryan Eggold

=== 2011 ===
- A Beginner’s Guide to Endings Directed by Jonathan Sobol | Delmer Builds A Machine Directed by Landon Zakheim
- Yelling to the Sky Directed by Victoria Mahoney | Saeng-Il (Birthday) Directed by Jennifer Suhr
- Norman Directed by Jonathan Segal | Henley Directed by Craig Macneill
- Goold’s Gold Directed by Tucker Capps and Ryan Sevy | The Renovation Directed by Lea Mathiesen
- The Pill Directed by J.C. Khoury | Excuse Me Directed by Duncan Birmingham
- American Animal Directed by Matt D’Elia | Worst Enemy Directed by Lake Bell
- Salvation Boulevard Directed by George Ratliff | Hotdogs & Hand Grenades Directed by Justin Corsbie

=== 2010 ===
- Happythankyoumoreplease Directed by Josh Radnor | Patrol (Directed by John Patton Ford
- Waiting for Forever Directed by James Keach | Extension Directed by Tyler Byrne
- Elektra Luxx Directed by Sebastian Gutierrez | Blowing Bubbles Directed by Vaughn Juares
- Teenage Paparazzo Directed by Adrian Grenier | The Poodle Trainer Directed by Vance Malone
- The Wild Hunt Directed by Alexandre Franchi | Charlie and the Rabbit Directed by Robert Machoian and Rodrigo Ojeda-Beck
- Tanner Hall Directed by Francesca Gregorini and Tatiana von Furstenberg | Daughters Directed by Chloé Zhao
- Mercy Directed by Patrick Hoelck | The Hirosaki Players Directed by Jeff Sousa
- Tierra Madre Directed by Dylan Verrechia

=== 2009 ===
- Lymelife Directed by Derick Martini | Trece Años Directed by Topaz Adizes
- Gigantic Directed by Matt Aselton | Adelaide Directed by Liliana Greenfield-Sanders
- Peter and Vandy Directed by Jay DiPietro | Bridge Directed by Hillman Curtis
- My Suicide Directed by David Lee Miller | Acting for the Camera Directed by Justin Nowell
- Punching the Clown Directed by Gregori Viens | Asshole Directed by Chadd Harbold
- Picture Me Directed by Ole Schell and Sara Ziff | Veer! Directed by Patrick Barry
- Finding Bliss Directed by Julie Davis | Boob Directed by Honest

=== 2008 ===
- Diminished Capacity Directed by Terry Kinney | CTRL Z Directed by Robert Kirbyson
- Cook County Directed by David Pomes | Nosebleed Directed by Jeff Vespa
- Nightlife Directed by Tim Sanderson | If A Body Meet A Body Directed by Brian Davis
- Surfwise Directed by Doug Pray | The Ladies Directed by Christina Voros
- Half-Life Directed by Jennifer Phang | Larry Directed by Pierre Bennu
- Frost Directed by Steve Clark | Kill the Day Directed by Gavin Wiesen
- The Take Directed by Brad Furman | A Day's Work Directed by Rajeev Dassani

=== 2007 ===
- Crashing, Feature Directed by Gary Walkow | Regarding Sarah Directed by Michelle Porter
- You Are Here Directed by Henry Pincus | BITCH Directed by Lilah Vandenburgh
- The Signal Directed by: David Bruckner, Dan Bush, Jacob Gentry | The Angel Directed by Paul Hough
- Sharkwater Directed by Rob Stewart | Gimme Green Directed by Isaac Brown & Eric Flagg
- Chalk Directed by Mike Akel | No Diving Directed by William Hoffman
- When a Man Falls in the Forest Directed by Ryan Eslinger | High Maintenance Directed by Phillip Van
- He Was a Quiet Man Directed by Frank Cappello | The Saddest Boy in the World Directed by Jamie Travis

=== 2006 ===
- Dreamland Directed by Jason Matzner | Wet Directed by Hannah Beth King
- Wristcutters Directed by Goran Dukic | She She She She's a Bombshell Directed by Ben Levin
- F*CK Directed by Steve Anderson | This Morning Directed by Lucy Molloy
- Behind the Mask Directed by Scott Glosserman | At the Beach Directed by Andrew Lloyd
- Shut Up and Sing Directed by Bruce Leddy | Intervention Directed by Jay Duplass
- Neverwas Directed by Joshua Michael Stern | The Passage of Mrs. Clabash Directed by Scott Tuft
- Live Free or Die Directed by Gregg Kavet and Andy Robin | The Shirt Directed by Drake Doremus

=== 2005 ===
- Loverboy Directed by Kevin Bacon | The Act Directed by Susan Kraker & Pi Ware
- It's All Gone Pete Tong Directed by Micheal Dowse | Wow And Flutter Directed by Gary Lundgren
- On The Outs Directed by Lori Silverbush & Michael Skolnik)| Victoria Para Chino Directed by Cary Fukunaga
- Up For Grabs, Short Directed by Michael Wranovics)| Dog Eat Dog Directed by Jonathan Zames
- Four Eyed Monsters Directed by Susan Buice & Arin Crumley | Allison Directed by Jeff Drew
- Southern Belles Directed by Paul S. Myers & Brennan Shroff | The Butcher And The Housewife Directed by Ishai Setton
- Standing Still Directed by Matthew Cole Weiss | Our Time Is Up Directed by: Rob Pearlstein

=== 2004 ===
- Saved! Directed by Brian Danelly | Save Virgil Directed by Brad Ableson
- Nobody Needs to Know Directed by Azazel Jacobs | Damian Loeb In The Public Domain Directed by Phillip Hunt and Tracy Barry
- Sexless Directed by Alex Holdridge | Broken Condom Directed by Huck Botko and Andrew Gurland
- Milwaukee, Minnesota Directed by Allen Mindel | Chinese Dream Directed by Victor Quinaz
- Dear Pillow Directed by: Bryan Poyser | Pretty Dead Girl Directed by Shawn Ku
- My Date With Drew Directed by Brian Herzlinger, Jon Gun, Brett Winn | I am Stamos Directed by Rob Meltzer
- Knots Directed by Greg Lombardo | Gardening Tips for Housewives Directed by Jessica Weigmann

=== 2003 ===
- Kiss The Bride Directed by Vanessa Parise | Bun-Bun Directed by Katie Fleischer
- Five Years Directed by Brett Wagner | Broken Directed by Patrick Downs
- The New Suit Directed by Francois Velle | Jeff Farnsworth Directed by Paul Cotter
- Speedo Directed by Jesse Moss | On Six Mile Pond Directed by Wes Justice & Mamie McCall
- West Bank Brooklyn Directed by Ghazi Albuliwi | The Last Attack Of the Beast Directed by Gerrard Naranjo
- Assisted Living (Grand Jury Winner) Directed by Elliot Greenebaum | Tom Hits His Head Directed by Tom Putnam
- XX/XY Directed by Austin Chick | Blissfield Directed by Laura Gilkey

=== 2002 ===
- Love in the Time Of Money Directed by Peter Mattei | The Parlor Directed by Geoffrey Haley
- Face (Audience Award Winner) Directed by Bertha Bay-Sa Pan | Firebug Directed by Michelle Harris
- Tattoo A Love Story Directed by Richard Bean | JT Walker Directed by JT Walker
- Hell House Directed by George Ratliff | Mean People Suck Directed by Matthew Coles Weiss
- On_Line Directed by Jed Weintrob | Member Directed by David Brooks
- Solitude Directed by Susan Karker and Pi Ware | Joe and Charlie at the Ranch Directed by Christopher Romero
- Snipes Directed by Richard Murray | The Clearing Directed by Zack Resnicoff

=== 2001 ===
- Just a Kiss Directed by Fisher Stevens | The Office Party Directed by Chiara Edmands
- The American Astronaut (Directed by: Cory McAbee) | Metropopular (Directed by: Jonah Hall)
- American Chai (Directed by: Anurag Mehtay) | World Record Guy (Directed by: Chris Thompson)
- Welcome to Death Row (Directed by: Leigh Savidge) | Bullet in the Brain (Produced by: CJ Follini)
- Margarita Happy Hour (Directed by: Ilya Chaiken) | Helicopter (Directed by: Ari Gold)
- Amy's Orgasm (Directed by: Julie Davis) | Bed (Directed by: Johnanna Lee)
- The Chateau (Directed by: Jesse Peretz) | Offside (Directed by: Leanna Creel)

=== 2000 ===
- Dropping Out Directed by Mark Osborne | Das Clown Directed by Tom E. Brown
- I'll Take You There Directed by Adrienne Shelly | Sidewalkers Directed by Tara Veneruso
- What Happened to Tully Directed by Hilary Birmingham | G Directed by Rolf Gibbs
- Goat on Fire and Smiling Fish Directed by Kevin Jordan | This Guy in Falling Directed by Michael Horowitz and Gareth Smith
- The Operator Directed by Jon Dichter | Falling Directed by Aaron Rhodes
- Playing Mona Lisa Directed by Matthew Huffman | The Indescribable Nth Directed by Oscar Moore
- Urbania Directed by Jon Shear | Things to Remember About Daumier Directed by Matthew Konicek

=== 1999 ===
- A Slipping-Down Life Directed by Toni Kalem
- Sex The Annabel Chong Story Directed by Gnough Lewis | Herb Directed by Amie Steir
- Oxygen Directed by: Richard Shepard | Atomic Tabasco Directed by James Cox
- Dill Scalion Directed by Jordan Brady | Culture Directed by Ari Gold
- Devil Doll, Short Directed by Jarl Olsen
- Getting To Know You Directed by Lisanne Skyler | Tis The Season Directed by Justin Dorazio
- Big Monday Directed by Michael T. Rehfield | Fuzzy Logic Directed by Tom Kreuger
- Two Ninas Directed by Neil Turitz | Gunshy Directed by Maura Naughton

=== 1998 ===
- 2x4 Directed by Jimmy Smallhorne | I Remember Directed by Avi Zev Weider and David Chartier
- Modulations Directed by Iara Lee | Lark Rhapsody Directed by Lou Weinert
- Hand on a Hardbody Directed by S.R. Bindler | Phil Touches Flo Directed by David Birdsell
- The Farmhouse Directed by Marcus Spiegel | Cuba 15 Directed by Elizabeth Schub
- Anima Directed by Craig Richardson |Advice to Adventurous Girls Directed by Kim Woods
- Scrapple Directed by Christopher Hanson

=== 1997 ===
- Eye of God Directed by Tim Blake Nelson
- Shooting Lily Directed by Arthur Borman | Kiss & Tell Directed by Ivy Brooks
- The Last Big Thing Directed by Dan Zukovic | Shaft of Light Directed by Bill Tomlinson
- Love God Directed by Frank Grow | Redux Riding Hood Directed by Steve Moore
- Day at the Beach Directed by Nick Veronis | Anita Liberty Directed by R.J. Cutler
- The Riddle, directed by Evan Brenner (Note: born November 17, 1965)
- Two or Three Things but Nothing for Sure Directed by Tina DiFeliciantonio & Jane C. Wagner
- Hang Your Dog in the Wind Directed by Brian Flemming | Man About Town (Directed by: Kris Isacsson

=== 1996, First Year of Film Festival ===
- The Darien Gap Directed by Brad Anderson
- Mr. Spreckman's Boat Directed by John Huddles | One of Those Days Directed by Mark Decena
- Personal Belongings Directed by Steven Bognar | Love Story Directed by Jon Kane
- Man With Plan Directed by John O’Brien | Charlie the Chimp Directed by Chris Smith
- God's Lonely Man Directed by Francis von Zerneck | 13 Figures of Sarah Directed by Richard Dailey
- Squeeze Directed by Robert Patton-Spruill | Synthetic Pleasures Directed by Lara Lee
- The End, Short Directed by Chris Landreth
