= Justin Schwarz =

American filmmaker

Justin Schwarz is an American filmmaker, writer, director, and producer.

== Early life and education ==
Born and raised in Orange County, California, Schwarz attended Yale University, where he graduated magna cum laude, Phi Beta Kappa. He received an MFA in Film from the School of the Arts at Columbia University.

== Career ==
Schwarz wrote, directed, and produced his debut feature-length film, The Discoverers, a story about a family that gets forced on a Lewis and Clark historical re-enactment trek.

Some critics found the story overly familiar, but most praised the performances, especially of star Griffin Dunne. The Hollywood Reporter described the film at its festival premiere as "More warm-hearted than funny, Schwarz's feature debut benefits from an intelligent script and sympathetic lead performance by Griffin Dunne." Writing in Vanity Fair, Bruce Handy noted: "The Discoverers arguably gives [Dunne] his best role since After Hours, directed by Martin Scorsese." The film was a New York Times Critics' Pick. In addition to Dunne, the film's cast included Madeleine Martin, Cara Buono, Ann Dowd, David Rasche, Becky Ann Baker, Stuart Margolin, Scott Adsit, Devon Graye and John C. McGinley.

Schwarz attended the Hampton's Screenwriters Lab in 2010 with The Discoverers script. The film was a part of IFP's No Borders International Co-Production Market. After completion, The Discoverers was screened as part of IFP's 'American Independents in Berlin.'

Schwarz wrote for several industry publications about the process of producing The Discoverers from concept to finished production. These writings provide how-to tips for indie filmmakers and discuss the challenges of making low-budget films.

Schwarz is a member of the Writers Guild of America. His writing for production companies includes an adaptation of Kevin Henkes book Olive's Ocean for Sovereign Films.

While in graduate school, Schwarz directed the short film Me and the Moilsies, a coming-of-age story about a Hasidic boy set in 1959. Reviewed in Film Threat, critic Morgan Miller noted "While the film may seem flat and stilted from time to time, Schwarz's overall direction is well-paced, observant, and detailed."

In 2025, Schwarz co-founded the art gallery Friday Arts along with his wife.
