= Game six =

Game six is a shorthand reference to a sixth game of a sports playoff series. Several World Series have had sixth games that were especially memorable, and were referred to by this shorthand expression. Some of them are:

- 1975 World Series
- 1985 World Series
- 1986 World Series
- 1992 World Series
- 1993 World Series
- 2011 World Series

== See also ==
- Game 6, a 2005 film
