= Ma Maison =

Restaurant in Los Angeles, US

Ma Maison was a restaurant opened by Patrick Terrail in October 1973 at 8368 Melrose Avenue, Los Angeles, California. The restaurant closed in November 1985. Ma Maison is credited with launching Wolfgang Puck's career and for starting the culinary trend known as "California nouvelle". According to the Los Angeles Times: "By using ingredients sourced from the local farmers markets that highlighted the glory of California's produce and pairing it with French technique, they created a new type of cuisine." Ma Maison was also known for being a hot spot for celebrities and Hollywood figures of the time. Celebrity chronicler Robin Leach noted "it truly became the favorite culinary playground for Hollywood's rich and famous".

== Name and history ==
Wrote founder Terrail: "It was important to me that my restaurant have a French name, but it was equally important that the public be able to say it. ... When I said Ma Maison, I was referring to my home. But each time my guests would say it...it became their home, too. That's what I wanted."

Early backers in Ma Maison included Gene Kelly. Kelly's $5,000 investment came at an investment pitch dinner party in late 1973. Terrail has also credited director Mel Stuart and producer Fred Weintraub as early investors, and also as attendees at the 1973 dinner party.

Wolfgang Puck became the chef at Ma Maison in 1975 and departed circa 1982 to form his own restaurant, Spago. Terrail has credited the eventual success of Ma Maison with his partnership with Puck: "The Ma Maison makeover did not happen overnight. The first step was [for me] to walk out of the kitchen and hire an incredible chef. I wanted a real chef in my kitchen. I also wanted somebody who was trained in France. ... Wolfgang is a wonderful creator and he is dedicated to working with the best ingredients."

Terrail arranged for many famous artists to paint the menu covers designed by David Hockney. (One menu was featured in an art exhibition at the Los Angeles Central Library). Puck refers to an early offer from Andy Warhol: "Eventually Andy Warhol wanted to paint me. I was like, 'No, no, no. Make me my menu cover.'"

The Ma Maison phone number was unlisted to avoid outsider patronage. In a 2015 interview, Terrail said: "There were practical reasons for everything we did, but it was taken as snob appeal. People magazine was going to come out with a story on Ma Maison, and I was worried that we would be overwhelmed. So I said, 'The best way to stop that is to unlist our phone number,' and we kept it unlisted. People published the number anyway. The concierge at the Beverly Wilshire was selling the number for $5."

Besides being a hotspot for celebrities, they attracted "businessmen and lawyers ... for what became known as Ma Maison's 'drunk lunches'. Debauchery ensued, and conspicuous consumption to the highest degree was commonplace."

== In the media ==
Ma Maison was featured as a location in the 2008 movie Frost/Nixon, directed by Ron Howard. In his credited character as "Ma Maison host" in the theatrical release, Terrail appears as himself circa 1977, shot from behind, his voice audible as he welcomes David Frost, Richard Nixon, and guests to the restaurant. Relating to the entertainment at that point in the scene, the AFI Catalog notes: "According to the production notes, the parody of the song, 'Love and Marriage' heard during the Ma Maison sequence was actually written on the occasion of Frost's 1977 birthday party." In a 2013 article, Frost's real-life companion depicted in the movie, Carloine Cushing Graham, describes a contemporaneous incident: "When the last days' interview was over, there were 28 hours of interviews, Nixon invited us for drinks at the Western White House. Diane Sawyer accompanied us to a private room for cocktails. Nixon asked me if I liked good wine, as he was proud of his cellar. Driving away that evening I felt sorry for Nixon, he was so lonely and we were going to a party at Ma Maison, where Sammy Kahn [sic] was performing." Sammy Cahn is depicted in the Ma Maison scene, along with Neil Diamond.

== Closure ==
Ma Maison closed on November 1, 1985.

One source stated the "fall from greatness" began when sous chef John Sweeney strangled his actress girlfriend (Dominique Dunne) on October 30, 1982, leading to her death on November 4, 1982. Sweeney's trial began in August 1983. Dunne's father, Dominick Dunne, wrote in detail about the trial in Vanity Fair magazine, referring in some passages specifically to Ma Maison. Many believed Terrail supported Sweeney, leading "the glamorous clientele" to stop frequenting the restaurant. Terrail himself, in his book about the history of Ma Maison, both confirms the narrative of how Dominique Dunne's murder affected the restaurant and defends his own role:

"The last time I ever saw or talked to Sweeney was when he completed his shift on the evening of the attack. Yet some would have you believe that I played a much more prominent role in Sweeney's defense... Some people have angrily accused me of supporting John Sweeney by providing his bail and legal services...but none of it is true.

"Somebody very important [at a Hollywood party I catered] called me a murderer...I got blackballed in Hollywood for a very long time by a certain group of people who thought I took one side against another. It couldn't have been further from the truth. My attorney, Joe Shapiro, who was a friend of Sweeney's, went to the trial to show support for his friend. Because he was my counsel, by association, the media thought I was somehow involved.

"Many people didn't come back to my restaurant because they associated Ma Maison with the murder. I never showed it because I had a business to run, but it really affected both me and Ma Maison. Dominique Dunne's death was tragic for those who knew and loved her."

== Notable former employees ==
- Suzanne Goin
- Gordon Hamersley
- Mark Peel
