= Amy Robinson =

American actress and film producer

- Born: April 13, 1948 (age 78); Trenton, New Jersey, US
- Education: Trenton High School; Sarah Lawrence College
- Occupations: Producer; actress
- Years active: 1972–present

Amy Robinson (born April 13, 1948) is an American film producer and former actress.

== Life and career ==
Born in Trenton, New Jersey on April 13, 1948, Robinson is the eldest of three daughters born to Rutgers University professor Estelle (née Richmond) and West Trenton-based pediatrician Irving W. Robinson. She graduated from Trenton High School in 1966 and from Sarah Lawrence College, where she was classmates with Brian De Palma, with later film education at the Sundance Institute. She was a production assistant on De Palma's Sisters (1972) and Phantom of the Paradise (1974).

She got her first film role as the female lead in Martin Scorsese's breakthrough hit Mean Streets. She turned to producing when disappointed with the roles she was being offered, eventually producing Scorsese's film After Hours.

In 1986, Robinson and her business partner in Double Play Productions, Griffin Dunne, signed a two-year deal with Metro-Goldwyn-Mayer to develop motion pictures. She was a member of the dramatic jury at the Sundance Film Festival in 1987.

== Filmography ==
=== Film ===
==== Producer ====
- Chilly Scenes of Winter (1979)
- Baby It's You (1983)
- After Hours (1985)
- Running on Empty (1988)
- White Palace (1990)
- Once Around (1991)
- With Honors (1994)
- For Love of the Game (1999)
- Drive Me Crazy (1999)
- Autumn in New York (2000)
- When Zachary Beaver Came to Town (2003)
- Game 6 (2005)
- Julie & Julia (2009)

==== Executive producer ====
- From Hell (2001)
- Marie and Bruce (2004)
- The Great New Wonderful (2005)
- 12 and Holding (2005)

==== Actress ====
- The Long Goodbye (1973) - Unknown role (uncredited)
- Mean Streets (1973) - Teresa Ronchelli

=== Television ===
==== Actress ====
- A Brand New Life (1973, TV movie) - Nancy
- Get Christie Love! (1974, Episode: "Bullet from the Grave") - Sally
- The Neighborhood (1982, TV movie) - Mrs. Kilgore
- Casualty (1988, Episode: "Inferno") - Julie

== Awards and nominations ==
Institution	Year	Category	Work	Result
Black Reel Awards	2002	Outstanding Film	From Hell	Nominated
Film Independent Spirit Awards	1986	Best Film	After Hours	Won
Heartland International Film Festival	2004	Crystal Heart	When Zachary Beaver Came to Town	Won
