= Griffin Dunne =

American actor and director (born 1955)

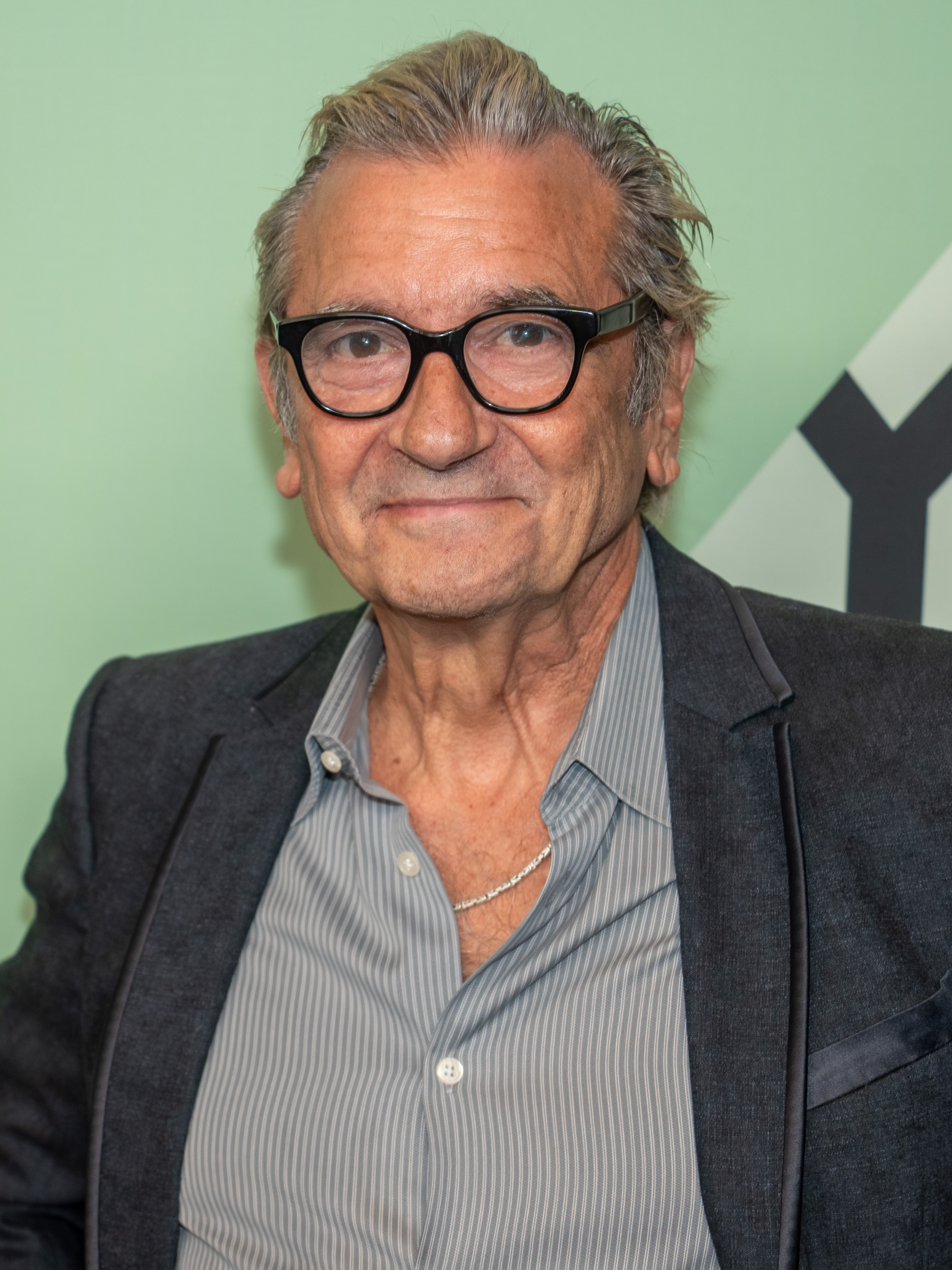
- Dunne in 2025
- Born: Thomas Griffin Dunne; June 8, 1955 (age 71); New York City, U.S.
- Education: The Neighborhood Playhouse School of the Theatre
- Occupations: Actor; director; producer
- Years active: 1975–present
- Spouses: Carey Lowell (m. 1989; div. 1995) Anna Bingemann (m. 2009; div. 2010)
- Children: Hannah Dunne
- Parent(s): Dominick Dunne; Ellen Griffin
- Relatives: Dominique Dunne (sister); John Gregory Dunne (uncle); Joan Didion (aunt)

Thomas Griffin Dunne (/ˈdʌn/; born June 8, 1955) is an American actor, director, and producer. Known for his performances on film and television, he has received nominations for an Academy Award, Golden Globe Award, and Primetime Emmy Award.

Dunne is the oldest child of journalist Dominick Dunne and activist Ellen Beatriz and studied acting at the Neighborhood Playhouse School of the Theatre. He made his film-acting debut in The Other Side of the Mountain (1975). He portrayed Jack Goodman in the John Landis comedy horror film An American Werewolf in London (1981) and Paul Hackett in Martin Scorsese's black comedy After Hours (1985), for which he was nominated for the Golden Globe Award for Best Actor – Motion Picture Musical or Comedy. He also acted in supporting roles in My Girl (1991), Straight Talk (1992), Quiz Show (1994), Dallas Buyers Club (2013), The French Dispatch (2021), and Caught Stealing (2025).

As a filmmaker, he made his directorial debut with the short Duke of Groove (1995), which was nominated for the Academy Award for Best Live Action Short Film. He made his feature-length directorial debut with Addicted to Love (1997) followed by Practical Magic (1998) and The Accidental Husband (2008). He also directed the Netflix documentary Joan Didion: The Center Will Not Hold (2017). On television, he guest-starred on Frasier for which he was nominated for the Primetime Emmy Award for Outstanding Guest Actor in a Comedy Series. He also took guest roles in House of Lies (2013–2014), I Love Dick (2016–2017), This Is Us (2018–2022), Goliath (2019–2021), and Only Murders in the Building (2024).

== Early life ==
Thomas Griffin Dunne was born on June 8, 1955, in New York City. He is the oldest child of Ellen Beatriz (née Griffin) and Dominick Dunne. His father was born and raised in an Irish Catholic family, while his maternal grandfather was Irish-American and his maternal grandmother was from Sonora, Mexico. He is the older brother of Alexander and Dominique Dunne. His mother founded the victims' rights organization Justice for Homicide Victims after Dominique's murder in 1982. His father was a journalist, producer, writer, and actor. He is also a nephew of writers John Gregory Dunne and Joan Didion. Raised in Los Angeles, Dunne attended the Fay School in Southborough, Massachusetts, and Fountain Valley School in Colorado Springs, where he developed an interest in acting, appearing in many school plays. He was scheduled to perform in a school production of Othello, when on the eve of a performance, a teacher found him smoking marijuana. Dunne was subsequently expelled and moved back to New York City to pursue his acting interests. He studied acting at the Neighborhood Playhouse School of the Theatre under Sanford Meisner.

== Career ==
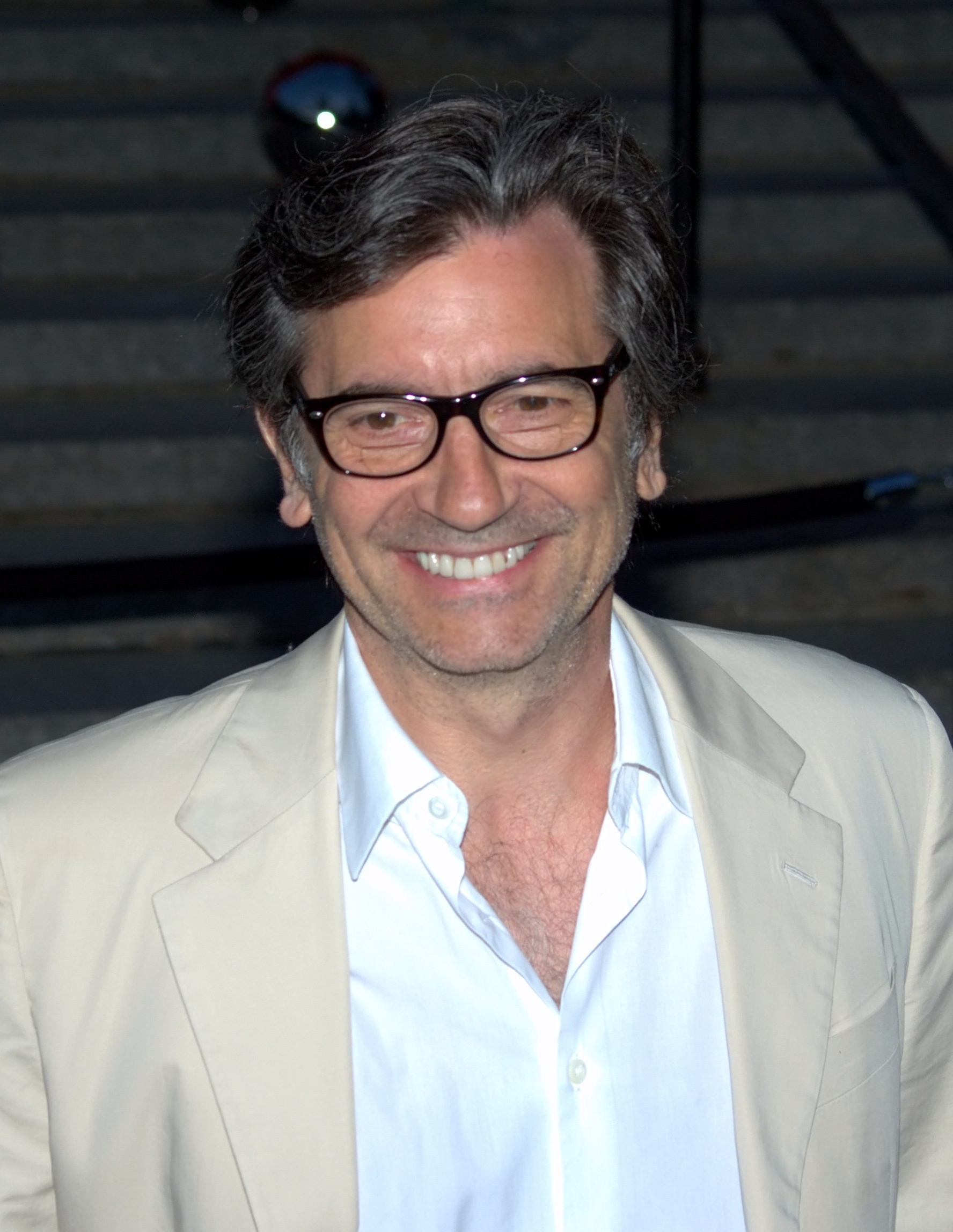
Dunne in 2010

=== Acting ===
Dunne began his professional acting career at age 19 with a small, supporting role in The Other Side of the Mountain in 1975. He has since appeared on both film and television, starring in An American Werewolf in London (1981) as Jack Goodman, Johnny Dangerously (1984) as Tommy Kelly, After Hours (1985) as Paul Hackett, Who's That Girl (1987) as Loudon Trott opposite Madonna, My Girl (1991) as Jake Bixler, Quiz Show (1994) as the Geritol Account Executive, Game 6 (2005) as Elliott Litvak, and I Like It Like That (1994) as Stephen Price. Dunne also played Dr. Vass, opposite Matthew McConaughey, in the Oscar-winning 2013 film Dallas Buyers Club.

Dunne's television appearances include Frasier (pilot episode "The Good Son" as caller Russell, and in season three, episode 11 "The Friend" as Bob), Saturday Night Live, Alias, and Law & Order: Criminal Intent (episodes "Jones", "Country Crossover", and "Players"). He portrayed Tony Mink in the comedy Trust Me on TNT. In 2012, Dunne guest-starred as management consultant Marco Pelios in seven episodes of the premiere season of the Showtime TV series House of Lies.

In 2018, he joined the cast of This is Us, in which he starred as Nicky Pearson, Jack Pearson's brother, until the series concluded in 2022.

=== Producing ===
Dunne's first experience as a producer was the successful 1982 film Chilly Scenes of Winter, an adaptation of the 1976 novel of the same name by Ann Beattie. Dunne and his co-producers, Amy Robinson and Mark Metcalf, had formed their production company, Triple Play Productions, in the late 1970s and optioned Beattie's book after agreeing to her stipulation that she be given a role. The film had a less-than-successful short run in theaters when it was released three years earlier with a "happy" ending and an alternate title, at the insistence of the distributor, United Artists. The trio persevered to have the film re-released with a more realistic ending and the same title as the book, which proved more successful. Dunne had a small part in the film, as Dr. Mark, a medical student. After Mark Metcalf left the company, Dunne and Robinson continued as producing partners. Their company, now called Double Play Productions, produced several films, including Baby It's You, After Hours, Running on Empty, and Game 6. In 1986, the company had signed an agreement with Metro-Goldwyn-Mayer for a two-year production agreement.

=== Directing ===
Dunne's directorial debut was the 1995 short film Duke of Groove. For it, Dunne received a nomination for an Academy Award for Best Live Action Short Film, along with producer Thom Colwell.

Since then, he has directed five feature films, including Addicted to Love (1997) and Practical Magic (1998). He also directed one segment of the 2013 anthology sex comedy film Movie 43, which later earned him a Razzie. Dunne produced and directed Joan Didion: The Center Will Not Hold (2017), a documentary about his aunt, author Joan Didion, whom Dunne interviews and with whom he appears on screen.

=== Writing ===
Dunne has written articles for The New York Times Travel section, Details magazine, and Porter magazine, and has a Kindle Single collection of short stories on Amazon called "Air Guitar". His family memoir, The Friday Afternoon Club, was released on June 11, 2024.

== Personal life ==
Dunne was married to American actress Carey Lowell from 1989 to 1995. They had one daughter together, actress Hannah Dunne.

He was married to Anna Bingemann, an Australian stylist, from 2009 to 2010.

== Filmography ==
=== Film ===
Year	Title	Director	Producer	Notes
1979	Chilly Scenes of Winter		Yes	
1983	Baby It's You		Yes	
1985	After Hours		Yes	
1988	Running on Empty		Yes	
1990	White Palace		Yes	
1991	Once Around		Yes	
1996	Duke of Groove	Yes		Short film
1997	Addicted to Love	Yes		
1998	Practical Magic	Yes		
2000	Lisa Picard Is Famous	Yes		
2005	Fierce People	Yes	Yes	
2005	Game 6		Yes	
2006	Your Product Here	Yes		Short film
2008	The Accidental Husband	Yes		
2013	Movie 43	Yes		Segment: "Veronica"
2017	Joan Didion: The Center Will Not Hold	Yes	Yes	Documentary film
2021	With/In: Volume 2	Yes		Segment: "One Night Stand"

Executive producer

- Joe's Apartment (1996)
- Ex-Husbands (2023)

Acting roles

Year	Title	Role	Notes
1975	The Other Side of the Mountain	Herbie Johnson	
1979	Chilly Scenes of Winter	Dr. Mark	
1981	An American Werewolf in London	Jack Goodman	
1981	The Fan	Production Assistant	
1983	Baby It's You		
1983	Cold Feet	Tom Christo	
1984	Johnny Dangerously	Tommy Kelly	
1985	After Hours	Paul Hackett	
1985	Almost You	Alex Boyer	
1987	Amazon Women on the Moon	Doctor	Segment: "Hospital"
1987	Who's That Girl	Loudon Trott	
1988	The Big Blue	Duffy	
1988	Me and Him	Bert	
1991	My Girl	Mr. Jake Bixler	
1991	Once Around	Rob	
1992	Big Girls Don't Cry... They Get Even	David	
1992	Straight Talk	Alan Riegert	
1993	Naked in New York	Auditioner	
1993	The Pickle	Planet Cleveland Man	Uncredited
1994	I Like It Like That	Stephen Price	
1994	Quiz Show	Geritol Account Executive	
1995	Search and Destroy	Martin Mirkheim	
2000	Lisa Picard Is Famous	Andrew	
2001	Piñero	Agent	
2001	Sam the Man	Man in Bathroom	
2002	40 Days and 40 Nights	Jerry Anderson	
2002	Cheats	Mr. Davis	
2003	Stuck on You	Himself	
2005	Game 6	Elliott Litvak	
2006	Bondage	Dr. Simon	
2007	Snow Angels	Don Parkinson	
2008	The Great Buck Howard	Jonathan Finerman	
2009	Shrink		Uncredited
2010	Last Night	Truman	
2012	The Discoverers	Lewis Birch	
2013	Broken City	Sam Lancaster	
2013	Blood Ties	McNally	
2013	Dallas Buyers Club	Dr. Vass	
2014	Rob the Mob	Dave Lovell	
2014	Fugly!	Jefferey	
2015	Touched with Fire	George	
2015	Tumbledown	Upton	
2015	Consumed	Peter	
2016	My Dead Boyfriend	Joey Lucas / Nick McCrawley	
2017	War Machine	Ray Canucci	
2018	Ocean's 8	Parole Board Officer	
2018	Songbird	Joanne's Dad	
2019	Bittersweet Symphony	Griffin	
2021	With/In: Volume 2		Segment: "One Night Stand"
2021	The French Dispatch	Legal Advisor	
2023	Ex-Husbands	Peter Pearce	
2024	Junction	Lawrence	
2025	Caught Stealing	Paul	
2026	Joy Will Prevail	Louis Khan	

=== Television ===
Director

Year	Title	Episode(s)
2010	The Good Wife	"Ham Sandwich"
2010	The Good Wife	"Battle of the Proxies"
2010	The Good Wife	"A Material World"
2014	Red Band Society	"Know Thyself"

Actor

Year	Title	Role	Notes
1986	Amazing Stories	Dick	Episode: "Secret Cinema"
1986	Alfred Hitchcock Presents	Knoll	Episode: "The Jar"
1986	Saturday Night Live	Frankie Toussaint	Episode: "William Shatner/Lone Justice"; uncredited
1989	Trying Times	David	Episode: "Hunger Chic"
1990	Secret Weapon	Mordechai Vanunu	Television film
1992	Screenplay	Michael Tyne	Episode: "Buying a Landslide"
1993	Hotel Room	Robert	Episode: "Getting Rid of Robert"
1993	L.A. Law	Gerard Samuels	Episode: "F.O.B."
1993	Frasier	Russell (voice)	Episode: "The Good Son"
1993	Partners	Dean Robinson	Television film
1995	The Android Affair	Teach / William	Television film
1996	Frasier	Bob Reynolds	Episode: "The Friend"
2001	Blonde	The Playwright	2 episodes
2001	Law & Order: Criminal Intent	Henry Talbott	Episode: "Jones"
2002	Warning: Parental Advisory	Frank Zappa	Television film
2002	A Nero Wolfe Mystery	Nicolas Losseff	2 episodes
2002	What Leonard Comes Home To	Leonard	Television short
2004	Alias	Leonid Lisenker	2 episodes
2006	3 lbs	Dr. Jerry Cole	2 episodes
2006–07	Law & Order: Criminal Intent	Seamus Flaherty	2 episodes
2009	Trust Me	Tony Mink	13 episodes
2009	Leverage	Marcus Starke	Episode: "The Two Live Crew Job"
2010	How to Make It in America	Fresconi	Episode: "Crisp"
2010	White Collar	Wesley Kent	Episode: "Company Man"
2010	The Good Wife	Judge Jared Quinn	Episode: "Cleaning House"
2011	Damages	Dean Gullickson	3 episodes
2012–14	House of Lies	Marco Pelios	8 episodes
2013	Girls	Thomas - John's Father	Episode: "It's a Shame About Ray"
2013	The League	Burt	Episode: "The Von Nowzick Wedding"
2014	Red Band Society	Ruben Garcia	3 episodes
2015	Manhattan	Woodrow Lorentzen	4 episodes
2015–16	Sex & Drugs & Rock & Roll	Music Therapist	2 episodes
2016	Law & Order: Special Victims Unit	Benno Gilbert	Episode: "Fashionable Crimes"
2016–17	I Love Dick	Sylvère	8 episodes
2018	Imposters	Herman	2 episodes
2018	Succession	Dr. Alon Parfit	Episode: "Austerlitz"
2018	The Romanoffs	Frank Shefflied	Episode: "Panorama"
2018–22	This Is Us	Nicky Pearson	28 episodes
2019	Better Things	Durham	Episode: "The Unknown"
2019–21	Goliath	Gene Bennett	7 episodes
2021	Search Party	Richard Wreck	2 episodes
2021	The L Word: Generation Q	Isaac Zakarian	2 episodes
2023	Billions	George Pike IV a.k.a. Fourth	Episode: "The Owl"
2023	The Girls on the Bus	Bruce Turner	Recurring role
2023	Only Murders in the Building	Prof. Dudenoff	2 episodes
2023	The Simpsons	Cockroach Actor (voice)	Episode: "Desperately Seeking Lisa"
2026	Elsbeth	Elliott Pope	Episode "Murder, He Wrote"
TBA	Myron Bolitar	Alan Bolitar	Recurring role, upcoming series

=== Video game ===
Year	Title	Voice	Notes
1996	You Don't Know Jack Volume 2	Himself	Gave a trivia question while driving on the freeway

== Awards and nominations ==
Year	Title	Association	Category	Result	Ref.
1986	After Hours	Golden Globe Award	Best Actor in a Motion Picture – Comedy or Musical	Nominated	
1986	After Hours	Independent Spirit Award	Best Feature (shared with Robert F. Colesberry & Amy Robinson)	Won	
1994	Love Matters	CableACE Award	Actor in a Movie or Miniseries	Nominated	
1996	Duke of Groove	Academy Award	Best Short Film – Live Action (shared with Thom Colwell)	Nominated	
1996	Frasier	Primetime Emmy Award	Outstanding Guest Actor in a Comedy Series	Nominated	
2000	Lisa Picard Is Famous	Cannes Film Festival	Un Certain Regard Award	Nominated	
2000	—N/a	Deep Ellum Film Festival	Pioneer Filmmaker Award	Won	
2013	The Discoverers	Sarasota Film Festival	Achievement in Acting	Won	
2013	The Discoverers	Sedona International Film Festival	Outstanding Actor	Won	
2014	Movie 43	Golden Raspberry Award	Worst Director	Won	
