= Diary of a Teenage Hitchhiker =

- Genre: Drama
- Written by: Robert Malcolm Young
- Directed by: Ted Post
- Starring: Charlene Tilton; Katherine Helmond; Dominique Dunne
- Music by: Joe Renzetti
- Country of origin: United States
- Original language: English

Production
- Executive producer: Ric Rondell
- Producer: Stanley Shpetner
- Cinematography: Héctor R. Figueroa
- Editor: Edward M. Abroms
- Running time: 96 minutes
- Production companies: Sunrise Productions; The Shpetner Company

Original release
- Network: ABC
- Release: September 21, 1979

Diary of a Teenage Hitchhiker is a 1979 ABC network television movie which aired on September 21, 1979.

== Plot ==
In the fictional southern California town of Port Kirby, almost 18-year-old teenage Julie Thurston joins her friends Cathy, Francine, and Dana on a hitchhiking circuit that is popular among the teen girls in the town. It’s the summer after their high school graduation. While everyone is hanging at the beach Julie is seriously wondering about her future. She wants to be a sculptor, but her boyfriend Nick has other plans. Meanwhile, Francine has a good head on her shoulders, going to beauty college; Dana is a wild party girl who might want to be a spy; Cathy is pregnant from her boyfriend and only her best friends know.

Whether they are headed towards the beach or to school or to a job, they view hitchhiking as their only way of getting around, against parental advice. Julie’s parents worry very much about their daughter particularly after there are rumors of a maniac predator in the area driving around. Her younger sister Trish also worries about her. Julie secures a job at the local beach hangout, Karp’s Kave working with her other friend Roz.

In order to get there, Julie hitches with a guy who initially seems dangerous, but is just a dad who tries to scare her out of hitching. Her boyfriend Nick shows up one day and they finally break up when he decides to go out on the road. Julie meets a nice older man named Ron who encourages her sculpting. Meanwhile, Cathy is planning to get an abortion. While headed to the doctor's office, she hitches a ride with the predator who attacks and sexually assaults her. Cathy winds up in the hospital and suffers from a miscarriage.

Dana becomes the second victim of the predator after she dies in a car accident while hitchhiking. Meanwhile, Ron has been spending a lot of time with Julie. While comforting her after Dana's death, Ron asks Julie to join him in Los Angeles to look into getting into sculpting. After she returns home, Ron calls to say that he hooked Julie up with a possible scholarship and a great opportunity for her sculpting future.

Julie has to get back to him with samples of her work and she decides to hitchhike. She winds up riding with the same guy who attacked Cathy and Dana. The predator attacks Julie, but she survives the incident. As she recovers from the attack, Julie's parents commend her for being brave and they support her decision to live in Los Angeles to study art and sculpting.

The movie closes with the assumption that Julie will have a bright future and we see her little sister Trish attempting to hitch.

== Cast ==
- Charlene Tilton as Julie Thurston
- Dick Van Patten as Herb Thurston
- Katherine Helmond as Elaine Thurston
- Katy Kurtzman as Trish Thurston
- Dominique Dunne as Cathy Robinson
- James Carroll as Jordan as Ron Leland
- Christopher Knight as Nick
- Brad David Stockton as Wayne
- Karlene Crockett as Dana
- Shelley Batt as Francine
- Alain Patrick as Claude
- Richard Sanders as Mr. Fogarty
- Patricia Smith as Marion Burke
- Jack Rader as Sean Burke
