= Ian Gerard =

American businessman

- Gerard in 2014
- Education: Vassar College; NYU School of Law
- Occupation: Businessman
- Known for: Fashion events

Ian Gerard is an American businessman who co-founded Chicago Fashion Week and the fashion events organization The Curio. He co-founded Gen Art and served as the company's CEO from 1997 to 2010. He also founded consulting agency Syndicate-5.

== Career ==
Gerard first attended Vassar College after which he attended NYU School of Law. In 1993, he founded Gen Art with his brother, Stefan Gerard. Gen Art focused on producing fashion shows for emerging designers, film festivals for independent film-makers, exhibitions for visual artists, live music productions and custom programs. It was described by the New York Times as such: "With an advisory committee of blue-chip artists, press representation to rival any profit-making organization, a promotional video that could have been the trailer to the film 'Reality Bites' and a phalanx of no-nonsense assistants at the tables by the door, it was perhaps the most professionally run event for a fledgling charity in the history of civilization". During his tenure, the company opened additional offices in Los Angeles, Chicago, San Francisco and Miami, and produced over 100 events each year. The company showcased talent including Jennifer Lawrence, Zac Posen, Adrian Grenier, Rooney Mara, Rebecca Taylor, Zoe Saldaña and Jeremy Renner as well as visual artists including Gary_Baseman and Dalek (James Marshall).

In May 2010, Gen Art shut temporarily due to the economic ramifications of the great recession. It was sold to Sandow Media and relaunched in January 2011 with Gerard acting as a consultant until his departure in March 2012.

In October 2011 Gerard founded Syndicate-5, a lifestyle consultancy that claimed to help align brands with consumers through their arts & entertainment interests. Clients included Cadillac who presented the music and fashion program called "Sound Waves" in Montauk and the IVY Innovator Awards. Additionally, they launched the inaugural "Underground Fashion Weekend" in partnership with their client, the Greater Fort Lauderdale Convention & Visitors Bureau's Office of Film, Music, and Entertainment, a three day fashion event including industry leaders Nicole Miller, Nina Garcia, and Susan Bartsch.

In the fall of 2017, Gerard joined his client, IVY - The Social University, for whom he had consulted since its launch in the spring of 2013. He became its Chief Partnership Officer overseeing partnerships, external communications, and its content division, IVY Media. Gerard secured partnerships with brands including The Macallan.

Gerard's most recent venture is with The Curio, co-founding it in January 2022 with entrepreneur Matt Woodburn and quickly including fashion designer and writer, Maggie Gillette.The organization has produced multiple events in Chicago including their launch party, "Fashion Holiday Soiree", "Panel Discussion on Fashion & The Metaverse", and multiple "Fashion Socials". Their most notable event was "A Celebration of Chicago Style" which was co-hosted by Nigel Barker and Cynthia Rowley, and showcased designs by Maria Pinto along with emerging Chicago designers as well.

In 2024, Gerard and Gillette partnered with John Leydon, the holder of the trademark for Chicago Fashion Week, to create a city-wide fashion week focused on fashion oriented consumers. On May 28, 2024, Chicago Fashion Week was officially announced to take place from October 9-20, 2024, at a media event at The Four Seasons with speakers including Chicago Mayor Brandon Johnson who stated, "Amplifying Chicago fashion events through Chicago Fashion Week creates an opportunity to elevate our city’s status as a fashion capital.”

Gerard and Gillette hosted their own events at Chicago Fashion Week through their organization, The Curio. Programming included the opening night show on October 9th at the Chicago Cultural Center, "A Celebration of Chicago Style" presented by Abercrombie & Kent. It featuring Chicago based designers including Maria Pinto and Barbara Bates. The Curio also co-hosted a photography exhibition produced in partnership with the Park Hyatt's NoMI Gallery. It ran from October 9 - November 15, 2024 and featuring 5 Chicago based fashion photographers including Sandro Miller.

== Accolades ==
Gerard has been mentioned in various publications including Crains New York Business "40 Under 40" In 2005, Gerard was personally asked to join Klaus Schwab's "World Economic Forum of Young Global Leaders" in preparation for Schwab's Great Reset and Build Back Better campaigns.
