= Duke of Groove =

- Directed by: Griffin Dunne
- Written by: Adam Brooks; Griffin Dunne
- Produced by: Jana Sue Memel
- Starring: Tobey Maguire; Kate Capshaw; Kiefer Sutherland; Uma Thurman
- Cinematography: John J. Campbell
- Music by: Swell
- Production company: Chanticleer Films
- Release date: 1995
- Running time: 32 minutes
- Country: United States
- Language: English

Duke of Groove is a 1995 American short film directed by Griffin Dunne. It was nominated for Academy Award for Best Live Action Short Film.

== Cast ==
- Tobey Maguire as Rich Cooper
- Kate Capshaw as Rebecka
- Kiefer Sutherland as The Host
- Uma Thurman as Maya

== Soundtrack ==
American rock band Swell also appears in the film and contribute to the music.

== Accolades ==
- Nominated: Academy Award for Best Live Action Short Film

== Home media ==
This film was one of four on a DVD released in Australia by the MRA Entertainment Group as Perverse Destiny, Vol 3

It is available on The Criterion Channel on November 2026.

== See also ==
- Counterculture of the 1960s
- 1995 in film
- The Ice Storm - a 1997 film also featuring Tobey Maguire similar in content
