= Junction (2024 film) =

Film by Bryan Greenberg

- Release poster
- Directed by: Bryan Greenberg
- Written by: Bryan Greenberg
- Produced by: Chad A. Verdi; Aaron Kaufman; Anthony Gudas; Michelle Verdi; Chad Verdi Jr.; Paul Luba; Bryan Greenberg; Garrett Bates
- Starring: Bryan Greenberg; Ashley Madekwe; Jamie Chung; Sophia Bush; Griffin Dunne
- Cinematography: Harlan Bosmajian
- Edited by: Tania Khodakivska
- Music by: John Graney
- Production companies: Verdi Productions; Public School Productions; Hyperborea Pictures; La Salle Productions
- Distributed by: VMI Releasing
- Release date: January 26, 2024
- Running time: 97 minutes
- Country: United States
- Language: English

Junction is a 2024 American thriller film written and directed by Bryan Greenberg and starring Greenberg, Ryan Eggold, Jamie Chung, Sophia Bush and Griffin Dunne. It is Greenberg's feature directorial debut.

Junction was released on 26 January 2024.

== Plot ==
The modern-day opioid crisis in America from three different perspectives.

== Cast ==
- Bryan Greenberg as Michael
- Josh Peck as Jeff
- Kea Ho as Kaya
- Griffin Dunne as Lawrence
- Sophia Bush as Allison
- Jamie Chung as Katie
- Michaela Conlin as Lisa
- Hill Harper as Ablees
- Ashley Madekwe as Mary
- Ryan Eggold as Jacob
- Dascha Polanco as Dana
- Dash Mihok as Matt
- Geoff Stults
- Eddie Kaye Thomas as Rodgers
- Hannah Dunne as Dez
- Yara Martinez as Nurse Kat
- Tom DeNucci as Vincent
- Eric Lutes as Hicks
- Nichelle Hines as Sharon
- Gianna Collier as Yvette

== Production ==
In May 2022, it was announced that Peck and Ho were cast in the film.

Principal photography took place in Rhode Island.

== Release ==
In January 2024, it was announced that VMI Releasing acquired the United States distribution rights to the film, which was initially scheduled to be released in theaters and on VOD on January 24, 2024. The release date was changed to January 26, 2024.
