= Carey Lowell =

American actress (born 1961)

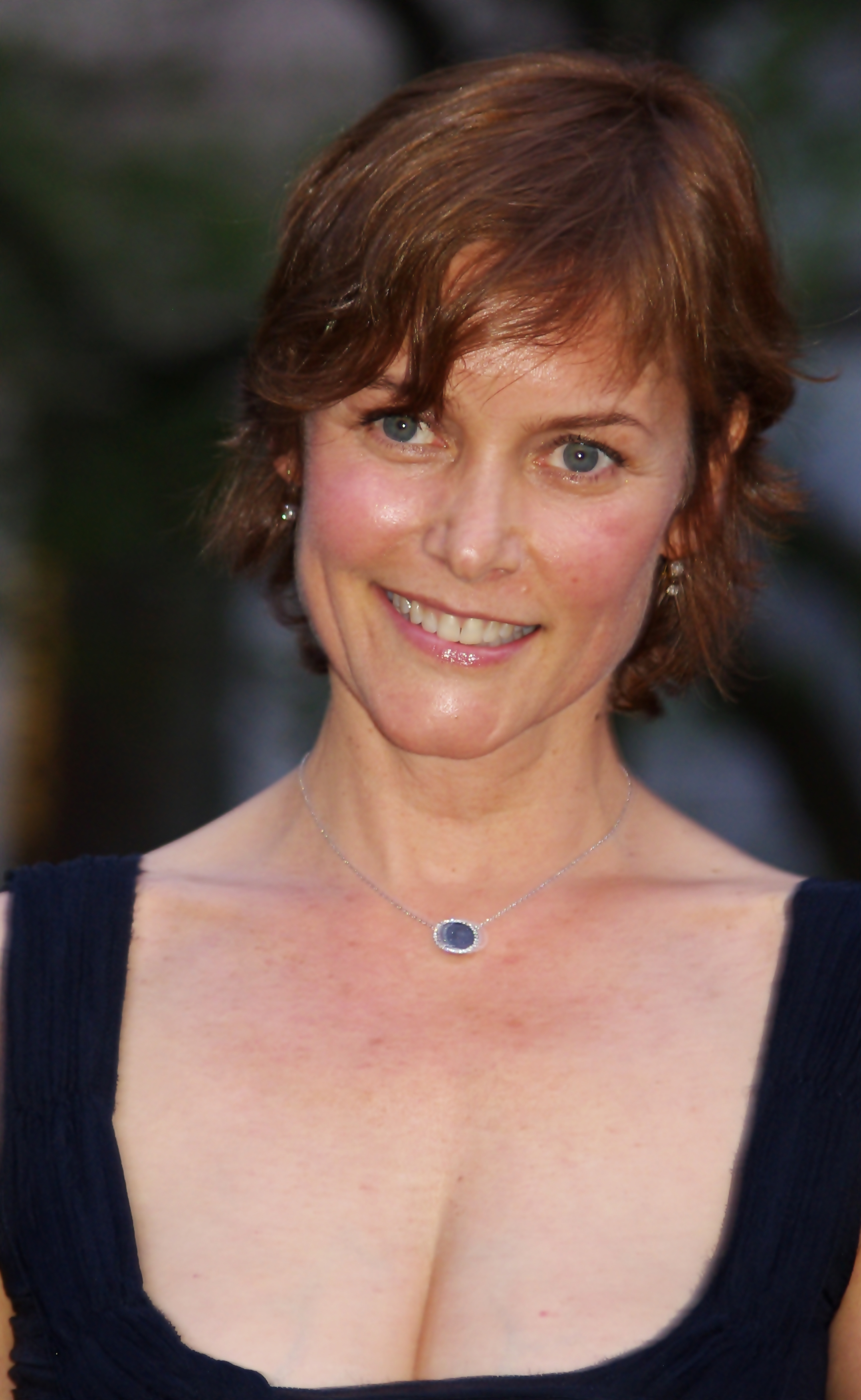
- Lowell at the 2011 Tribeca Film Festival Vanity Fair party
- Born: February 11, 1961 (age 65); Huntington, New York, US
- Education: University of Colorado at Boulder; New York University
- Occupations: Actress; model
- Years active: 1986–present
- Spouses: John Stember (m. 1984; div. 1988) Griffin Dunne (m. 1989; div. 1995) Richard Gere (m. 2002; div. 2016)
- Children: Hannah Dunne; Homer Gere
- Website: Official website

Carey Lowell (born February 11, 1961) is an American actress and former model, best known as New York Assistant DA Jamie Ross on Law & Order (1996–2001, 2022) and as Bond girl Pam Bouvier in the James Bond film Licence to Kill (1989).

== Early life ==
Lowell was born in Huntington, New York, the daughter of geologist James Lowell. She spent her childhood living in several countries, including Libya, the Netherlands, and France. In the United States, she also lived in Houston, Texas, and Denver, Colorado, where her family settled when she was 12. After a year at the University of Colorado at Boulder, where she considered majoring in literature, she moved to New York City to pursue modeling, and worked for such clients as Ralph Lauren and Calvin Klein, and at one point attended New York University. She also studied at Manhattan's Neighborhood Playhouse School of the Theatre.

== Career ==
Lowell broke into acting with the film Dangerously Close, followed by a small role in the Harold Ramis movie Club Paradise. She went on to roles including co-starring as Bond girl Pam Bouvier in the James Bond movie Licence to Kill (1989), and starting in 1996, as Assistant District Attorney Jamie Ross for two seasons on the television drama Law & Order, a character she reprised in 2005 for a guest role on its spinoff, Law & Order: Trial by Jury, and again on the original series in 2022 when it returned for a 21st season. Immediately before getting that role, however, she had become frustrated with her acting career and had applied to study documentary filmmaking at New York University.

She took a hiatus from acting during the mid-2000s. In 2012, Lowell lent her likeness and voice while reprising her Licence to Kill role in the video game 007 Legends. In 2018, she returned to TV, appearing as a guest on the show Blue Bloods.

== Personal life ==
Lowell is a devout Buddhist. She has incorporated Buddhist teachings into her life, including the naming of her son, Homer James Jigme; jigme is a Tibetan name meaning "fearless".

Lowell has been married three times. Her first husband was photographer John Stember, to whom she was married from 1984 to 1988. She was married to actor Griffin Dunne from 1989 to 1995 and has a daughter, Hannah, from the marriage. In November 2002, Lowell married actor Richard Gere; their son Homer Gere was born on February 6, 2000. In 2013, the two separated. They spent three years in highly contested divorce proceedings in New York Supreme Court. The case was settled in October 2016.

In 2021, Lowell launched the company Carey Lowell Ceramics.

== Filmography ==
=== Film ===
Year	Title	Role	Notes
1986	Dangerously Close	Julie	
1986	Club Paradise	Fashion Model	
1987	Down Twisted	Maxine	
1988	Me and Him	Janet Anderson	
1989	Licence to Kill	Pam Bouvier	
1990	The Guardian	Kate Sterling	
1993	Sleepless in Seattle	Maggie Baldwin	
1994	Love Affair	Martha	
1995	Leaving Las Vegas	Bank Teller	
1997	Fierce Creatures	Cub Felines	
2014	The Cause	Edith	Short
2016	C Street	Magnolia Fallon	

=== Television ===
Year	Title	Role	Notes
1991	Road to Ruin	Jessie Tailor	TV film
1993	A League of Their Own	Dottie Hinson	6 episodes
1996	Episode: Duke of Groove		Short
1996–2001, 2022	Law & Order	ADA Jamie Ross	Main role (seasons 7–8); Guest role (seasons 10–11, 21)
1997	Homicide: Life on the Street	ADA Jamie Ross	Episode: "Baby, It's You"
2001	Big Apple	Deirdre Stiles	2 episodes: "Follow the Blender" & "1.7"
2003	More Than Meets the Eye: The Joan Brock Story	Joan Brock	TV film
2005	Law & Order: Trial by Jury	Judge Jamie Ross	2 episodes: "41 Shots" & "Bang & Blame"
2005	Empire Falls	Francine Whiting (age 40)	Miniseries
2006–2007	Six Degrees	Christine Caseman	Recurring role
2012	007 Legends	Pam Bouvier (voice and likeness)	Video game
2018	Blue Bloods	Janet Thompson	Episode: "Tale of Two Cities"
2018	Bull	Marina DeMarte	Episode: "Fool Me Twice"
