= Hannah Dunne =

American actress (born 1990)

- Born: Hannah Beatriz Dunne; April 8, 1990 (age 36); Raleigh, North Carolina, U.S.
- Occupation: Actress
- Years active: 2012–present
- Parents: Griffin Dunne; Carey Lowell
- Relatives: Dominick Dunne (grandfather); Ellen Griffin Dunne (grandmother); Dominique Dunne (aunt); John Gregory Dunne (great-uncle); Joan Didion (great-aunt); Homer Gere (maternal half-brother)

Hannah Beatriz Dunne (born April 8, 1990) is an American actress. She is the daughter of actors Griffin Dunne and Carey Lowell, the granddaughter of writer and journalist Dominick Dunne and the niece of actress Dominique Dunne. She is best known for her portrayal of Lizzie Campbell in the Amazon TV series Mozart in the Jungle.

== Filmography ==
=== Film ===
Year	Title	Role	Notes
2012	Frances Ha	"Ask Me" Girl	
2012	The Discoverers	Student	Starring Griffin Dunne
2014	5 Flights Up	Debbie	
2014	Free the Nipple	Topless Warrior	
2019	Marriage Story	Set Designer	
2019	Beneath the Blue Suburban Skies	Debbie	
2023	Sharper	Brenda	
2024	Junction	Dez	

=== Television ===
Year	Title	Role	Notes
2014	Louie	Todd's Waitress	Episode: "Elevator: Part 5"
2014–2018	Mozart in the Jungle	Elizabeth "Lizzie" Campbell	27 episodes
2016	Horace and Pete	Jenny	Episode #1.6, web series
2016	Caring	Kate	Web series
2024	12 Desperate Hours	Carolee	Television film
