= Dominique Dunne =

American actress (1959–1982)

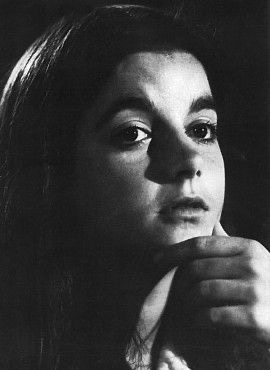
- Born: Dominique Ellen Dunne; November 23, 1959; Santa Monica, California, U.S.
- Died: November 4, 1982 (aged 22); Los Angeles, California, U.S.
- Cause of death: Homicide by strangulation (details)
- Burial place: Westwood Village Memorial Park Cemetery
- Education: Harvard-Westlake School; Taft School; Fountain Valley School
- Occupation: Actress
- Years active: 1979–1982
- Parents: Dominick Dunne; Ellen Griffin Dunne
- Relatives: Griffin Dunne (brother); John Gregory Dunne (uncle); Joan Didion (aunt); Hannah Dunne (niece)

Signature
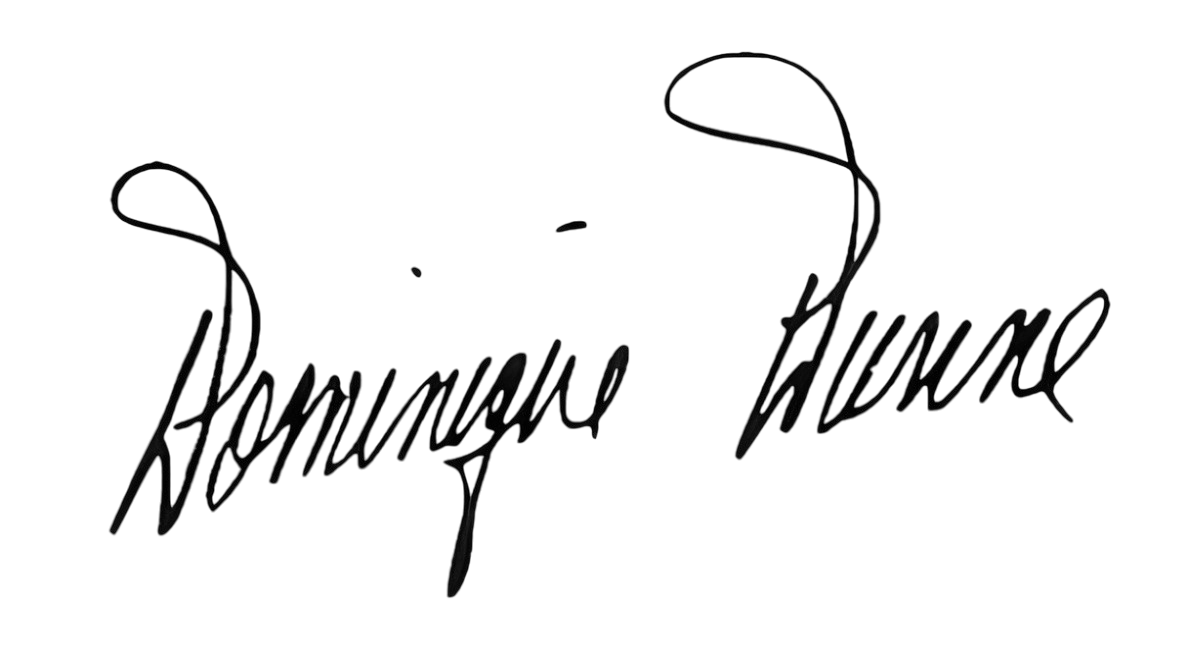

Dominique Ellen Dunne (November 23, 1959 – November 4, 1982) was an American actress. She made her on-screen debut with the television film Diary of a Teenage Hitchhiker (1979) and played recurring roles in the drama series Family (1980) and the comedy series Breaking Away (1980–1981). Her breakthrough role was Dana Freeling in the blockbuster horror film Poltergeist (1982). Afterward, she headlined the Western film The Shadow Riders and guest-starred in one episode of the crime series CHiPs (both 1982).

On October 30, 1982, Dunne was strangled by her ex-boyfriend John Thomas Sweeney during an argument on the driveway of her West Hollywood home. She fell into a coma and died five days later on November 4, 1982, at the age of 22.

== Early life and education ==
Dominique Ellen Dunne was born on November 23, 1959 in Santa Monica, California, the youngest child of Ellen Beatriz "Lenny" (née Griffin), a Mexican ranching heiress, and Dominick Dunne, an Irish-American writer, producer, and actor. Her mother was from Sonora, Mexico and her father was born and raised in an Irish Catholic family in the East. Dunne had two older brothers, Alexander "Alex" and Griffin Dunne, who is an actor, producer and director. She was the niece of married writers John Gregory Dunne and Joan Didion. Her godparents were Maria Cooper-Janis, daughter of actors Gary Cooper and Veronica "Rocky" Cooper, and producer Martin Manulis. Her parents divorced in 1965.

Dunne attended Harvard-Westlake School in Los Angeles, Taft School in Watertown, Connecticut, and Fountain Valley School in Fountain, Colorado. After graduation, she spent a year in Florence, Italy, where she studied art and learned Italian. She studied acting at Milton Katselas' Workshop and appeared in various stage productions, including West Side Story, The Mousetrap, and My Three Angels.

As the 1970s faded into the 80s, while launching her acting career, Dunne loved to party and hosted a gathering at her house every week for her fellow acting classmates called "The Friday Afternoon Club". Each Friday, her acting class, including then-rising actors George Clooney and Timothy Hutton, gathered until the wee hours in the Dunne back yard. In 2024, Dunne's brother Griffin Dunne released a family memoir titled The Friday Afternoon Club, named after this weekly gathering that the late actress hosted.

== Career ==
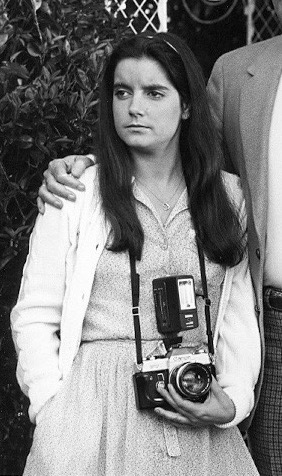
Dunne for a TV movie in 1981, before rising to stardom from Poltergeist

Dunne's first role was in the 1979 television film, Diary of a Teenage Hitchhiker. She then got supporting roles in episodes of popular 1980s television series, such as Lou Grant, Family, Hart to Hart, and Fame. Dunne also had a recurring role on the comedy-drama television series, Breaking Away, and she also appeared in several other television films.

After her television appearances, in 1981, Dunne was cast in the supernatural horror film Poltergeist in the main role of Dana Freeling, the teenaged daughter of a couple whose family is terrorized by malevolent ghosts. The film was produced by Steven Spielberg and directed by Tobe Hooper, and served as her feature film debut. Poltergeist was theatrically released in 1982, which marks both her first starring role and her only appearance in a theatrical feature. It went on to become a critical and commercial success, becoming the eighth highest grossing film of 1982, and since its release it has acquired a cult following. She was set to reprise the role in the following installments of the franchise, but she died before production began on the sequels; Poltergeist II: The Other Side, filmed in 1985 and released in 1986, explains her character's absence by stating that she has gone off to attend college.

Dunne and other actresses like Sharon Stone were considered for the heroine role of the 1982 film One Dark Night. When searching for a lead actress to play that role, director Tom McLoughlin had a specific vision for the film's heroine, "I wanted the classic beautiful blond geek girl who had a sense of innocence about her, and she was the one who was going to be tormented." Then 19-year-old actress Meg Tilly ended up getting cast for the role, and Batman actor Adam West was later cast for the role of the lead male character.

Dunne's last on-screen appearance was in the Hill Street Blues episode "Requiem for a Hairbag", which aired on November 18, 1982, only two weeks after her death. In the episode, she played a teenaged mother who was a victim of parental abuse and chose to give her baby up for adoption, out of fear of repeating the cycle of abuse that she endured with her own mother; due to an altercation with her abusive partner John Sweeney that occurred just before the episode was filmed, her bruises on screen were real. The episode was dedicated to her memory.

Dunne was cast in the miniseries V in 1982; she died during filming, so her role was portrayed by actress Blair Tefkin. According to series creator Kenneth Johnson, recovered footage of Dunne was used in a cameo appearance. The series was released in 1983, and is dedicated to her memory.

Other projects dedicated to Dunne's memory include Baby It's You, which was released a few months after her death. The film was co-produced by her brother Griffin and she was murdered around the time of the film's production.

== Influences ==
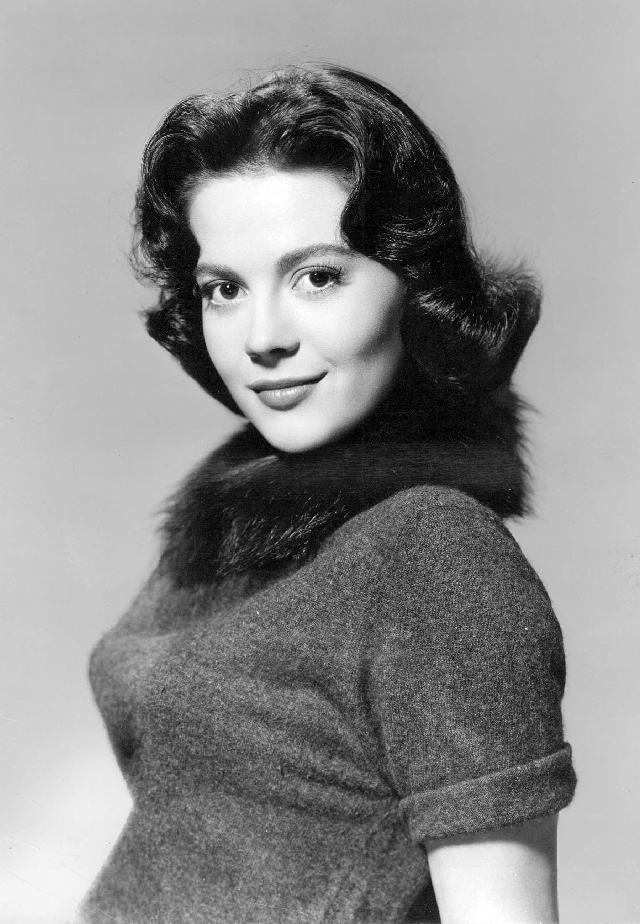
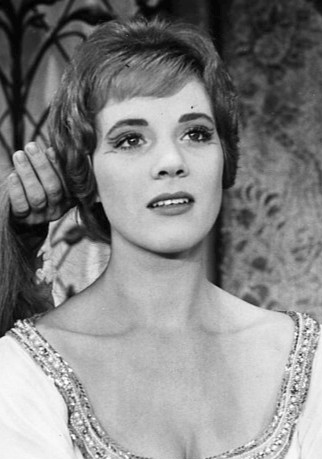
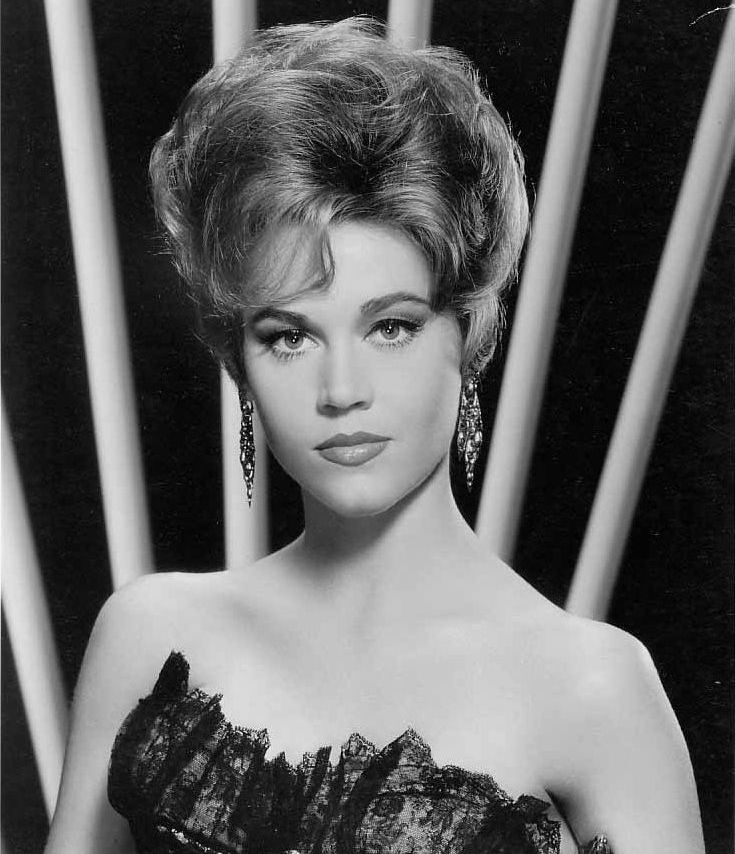
In an interview, Dunne said she admired multiple actresses, such as Natalie Wood (left), Julie Andrews (center), and Jane Fonda (right). She also mentioned that she loved Susan Hayward and her film I'll Cry Tomorrow.

Besides her family influence, numerous film stars and celebrities of the 1950s and 60s were friends of Dunne's parents and regular guests at the home of her family. They would attend parties together and hang out at the Malibu beach, captured in home movies filmed by Roddy McDowall. Some of her own favorite actresses were Julie Andrews, Jane Fonda, Susan Hayward, and Natalie Wood, who was a close friend to her family, especially her mother.

== Personal life ==
Dunne was an animal lover who had a habit of collecting stray animals. Her house became an asylum for many of them, especially injured, disabled pets; her menagerie included a cat with a lobotomy and a large dog with stunted legs. At the time of her death, she had a Basset Hound puppy named Tallulah, after actress Tallulah Bankhead.

According to Dunne's brother Griffin, she comes across as whip-smart and droll, grounded and private. "She was a serious, substantial person," he says. "Serious about her acting, her animals, her family. And, actually, rather intimidating, even though she was the youngest of the family." He called her "somebody we were all a bit in awe of. She was always wise beyond her years... But also a bit bossy. She always knew what she wanted. My brother and I were a little fearful of her. It was like she'd been born already built."

Dunne was a supporter of the queer community. She was close friends with Norman Carby, an artist with whom her father, Dominick, was in a secret relationship—for which she played matchmaker—that lasted decades until Dominick's death in 2009. She cared for her father, who was bisexual and closeted and yet confided in her. Devoted to her parents, she also cared for her mother, Ellen, who had multiple sclerosis.

== Filmography ==
List of roles and appearances
Year	Title	Role	Notes
1979	Diary of a Teenage Hitchhiker	Cathy Robinson	Television film
1979–1980	Lou Grant	Various roles	2 episodes
1980	Family	Erica	Episode: "When the Bough Breaks"
1980	Valentine Magic on Love Island	Cheryl	Television film
1980–1981	Breaking Away	Paulina Bornstein	Recurring role; 4 episodes
1981	CBS Children's Mystery Theatre	Polly Ames	Episode: "The Haunting of Harrington House"
1981	Unit Four	Tracey Phillips	Television film
1981	The Day the Loving Stopped	Judy Danner	Television film
1982	Fame	Tracy	Episode: "Street Kid"
1982	Hart to Hart	Christy Ferrin	Episode: "Hart, Line, and Sinker"
1982	Poltergeist	Dana Freeling	Film
1982	The Shadow Riders	Sissy Traven	Television film
1982	CHiPs	Amy Kent	Episode: "Meet the New Guy"
1982	The Quest	Italian Girl	Episode: "He Stole-a My Art"
1982	Hill Street Blues	Abandoned Baby's Mother	Episode: "Requiem for a Hairbag"; posthumous release
1983	V	Robin Maxwell	Cameo; posthumous release

== Murder and burial ==
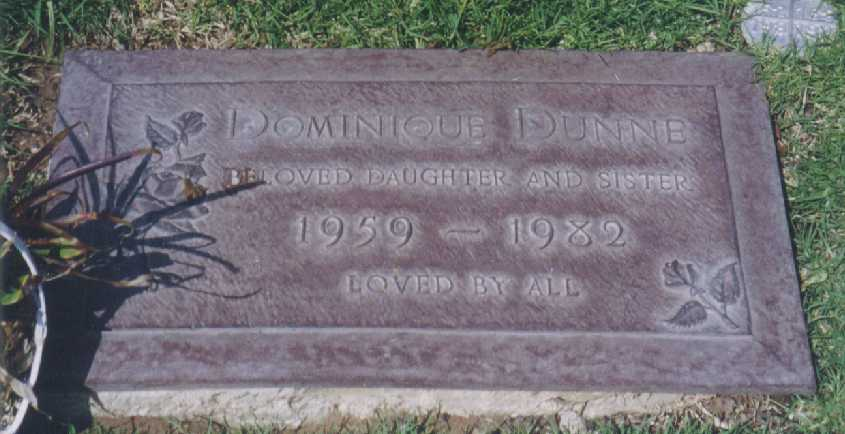
Headstone of Dunne's grave

Dunne met John Thomas Sweeney, a sous-chef at the restaurant Ma Maison, at a party in 1981. After a few weeks of dating, they moved into a one-bedroom house together on Rangely Avenue in West Hollywood. The relationship quickly deteriorated due to Sweeney's jealousy and possessiveness.

On October 30, 1982, Sweeney strangled Dunne outside of her home. She was transported to Cedars-Sinai Medical Center in Los Angeles, where she was placed on life support. She never regained consciousness. On November 4, her parents consented to have her removed from life support. At the request of her mother, Dunne's kidneys and heart were donated to transplant recipients. Her funeral was held on November 6 at the Church of the Good Shepherd in Beverly Hills. Her godfather, Martin Manulis, delivered the eulogy. Dominique Dunne’s remains were cremated and subsequently intered in the lawn at Westwood Village Memorial Park Cemetery.

== See also ==
- Poltergeist curse
