= Baby It's You (film) =

1983 film by John Sayles

- Theatrical release poster
- Directed by: John Sayles
- Screenplay by: John Sayles
- Story by: Amy Robinson
- Produced by: Griffin Dunne; Amy Robinson
- Starring: Rosanna Arquette; Vincent Spano
- Cinematography: Michael Ballhaus
- Edited by: Sonya Polonsky
- Music by: Todd Kasow
- Production company: Double Play
- Distributed by: Paramount Pictures
- Release date: March 4, 1983 (United States)
- Running time: 105 minutes
- Country: United States
- Language: English
- Budget: $3,000,000
- Box office: $1,867,792

Baby It's You is a 1983 American romantic comedy drama film written and directed by John Sayles. It stars Rosanna Arquette and Vincent Spano.

== Plot ==
In Trenton, New Jersey in 1966, two high school students start a relationship. Upper-middle-class Jewish girl Jill Rosen, who is bound for Sarah Lawrence College, meets a blue collar Italian boy nicknamed the Sheik, who aspires to follow in Frank Sinatra's footsteps.

Jill, who is successful in high school acting productions, rebuffs Sheik's sexual advances. He has a one-night stand with Jody, a sexually active friend of Jill's; Jody subsequently makes a half-hearted suicide attempt.

Sheik is expelled from school. After an attempted robbery and subsequent pursuit by local police, he buys a one-way train ticket to Miami, Florida. Jill leaves for her first year at Sarah Lawrence in the fall of 1967, where she becomes friends with Leslie. Leslie introduces her to her boyfriend's buddy, Steve, and the two couples occasionally double date.

Jill visits Sheik in Miami during spring break, and sees how little he has going for him, where he is washing dishes at a Miami Beach nightclub and lip syncs Sinatra recordings on weekends.

Jill has sex with Sheik. In the moments before they undress, their conversation turns to his odd nickname, which he had not explained to Jill when they dated in high school. He explains that it comes from the Sheik brand of condoms.

Some time after Jill returns to college, no longer a virgin, she sleeps with Steve. Sheik arrives at work to find that he has been replaced by a real singer, though he is no great talent. This humiliation makes Sheik self-aware of his almost non-existent opportunities. He steals a car and makes the long drive from Miami to Sarah Lawrence in New York, propelled by the romantic notion of reuniting with Jill.

Jill's college experience has not been easy or happy, and she has not met with the acting or social success she had in high school. Steve will not take her calls anymore. The act of consummating her desire for Sheik has led her to realize that she does not love him, having moved past the point of romantic and sexual wonder.

When Sheik arrives at Sarah Lawrence and does not find Jill, he violently trashes her room and waits for her return. When she does and he declares his love for her, she tells him that she does love him, but is not in love him, and has no desire for the life that he will have. Sheik briefly resists her response and then, in a moment of dignity, accepts it. Jill asks him, as a favor, to take her to a college dance, since she has been unable to find a date.

The dance highlights the quick change of pace in popular culture in the mid-1960s. In the midst of the dance, Sheik and Jill submit a request for the rock band to perform "Strangers in the Night", the Sinatra hit that had been a key part of their high school romance in New Jersey. As the song plays, they look into each other's eyes as they slow dance.

== Cast ==
- Rosanna Arquette as Jill
- Vincent Spano as Sheik
- Joanna Merlin as Mrs. Rosen
- Jack Davidson as Dr. Rosen
- Liane Curtis as Jody
- Tracy Pollan as Leslie
- Matthew Modine as Steve
- Sam McMurray as Mr. McManus

The film also features the first credited film role by Robert Downey Jr. as an adult, (Note: Downey Jr.'s previous, first-credited role was in 1970's Pound, when he was five years old) appearing as Stewart. This was the screen debut for Modine and the second film role for Pollan.

== Production ==
This was Sayles' first film for a major Hollywood studio. He based the screenplay on an autobiographical story by Amy Robinson. Inside and outside of Trenton Central High School was used as location in Fall of 1982, along with some exterior shots done at the Cliffside Park High School. The film was co-produced by Robinson and Griffin Dunne and was dedicated to Dunne's sister, actress Dominique Dunne, who was murdered around the time of the film's production.

Rosanna Arquette reflected on the role shortly after the film's theatrical release: "I went to high school for a while, but my experiences were shitty. Somebody asked me how I prepared for that role. I put on those knee socks and that skirt and - I don't know. I just felt her."

== Reception ==
=== Critical response ===
On the review aggregator website Rotten Tomatoes, 95% of 19 critics' reviews are positive, with an average rating of 6.8/10.

Film critic Janet Maslin discussed the music in the film and wrote, "Music is a major part of Baby, It's You, as the title may indicate. The score consists of rock songs that more or less correspond to the time, although Sheik's entrances are accompanied by Bruce Springsteen songs; these may be anachronistic, but they suit Sheik to a T. These touches, as well as the generally impeccable period details and the evocative cinematography by Michael Ballhaus (who shot many of R.W. Fassbinder's later films), suggest that Baby, It's You was a labor of love for everyone involved." In a joint review of Baby It's You and another John Sayles film, Lianna, Rolling Stone's Michael Sragow commented that Sayles has his strengths but is considerably overrated, and compared both films unfavorably to his earlier Return of the Secaucus 7. He elaborated that Baby It's You is too ideologically single-minded and suffers from oversights in its storytelling. Specifically, "it may take twenty minutes for an audience to realize that [the Sheik] actually attends high school and isn't a dropout hanging around."

Critic Dennis Schwartz wrote, "It was for indie filmmaker Sayles his first film to be made with financial backing by a major studio (Doubleday backed it and Paramount bought it), but he swore it would be his last as he was pissed that he lost final editing cut. For Sayles this is lighter fare than what he usually tackles, but he fights through all the teenage clichés to give his own spin on this romance, the significance of social-class differences, how it is to finally grow up by listening to your heart and to change with the times."

=== Box office ===
Baby It's You grossed $1.9 million in the United States and Canada, against a budget of $3 million.

== Awards ==
Wins

- Boston Society of Film Critics Awards: BSFC Award; Best Actress, Rosanna Arquette; 1984.

== Home media ==
In July 2008, Baby It's You was released on DVD. In April 2025, Fun City Editions put out a remastered Blu-ray.
