= Ellen Griffin Dunne =

American actor and activist (1932–1997)

- Ellen Griffin Dunne (left) with her daughter Dominique Dunne
- Born: Ellen Beatriz Griffin; January 28, 1932; Tucson, Arizona, U.S.
- Died: January 9, 1997 (aged 64); Nogales, Arizona, U.S.
- Other name: Lenny Dunne
- Occupation: Activist
- Spouse: Dominick Dunne (m. 1954; div. 1965)
- Children: 5, including Griffin and Dominique
- Relatives: Hannah Dunne (granddaughter)

Ellen Beatriz Griffin Dunne (January 28, 1932 – January 9, 1997) was an American activist. After the death of her daughter, Dominique Dunne, Dunne founded Justice for Homicide Victims. In 1989, she was recognized for her advocacy work by President George H. W. Bush.

== Early life and marriage ==
Ellen Beatriz Griffin was born on January 28, 1932, on Yerba Buena Ranch outside Tucson, Arizona. Her parents were Thomas Francis Griffin and Beatriz Sandoval Griffin. Thomas Francis Griffin was a wealthy Irish American industrialist, part owner and executive of Griffin Wheel Company of Chicago, Illinois. Her mother Beatriz Sandoval was Mexican from Nogales, Sonora. She attended Miss Porter's School in Farmington, Connecticut, Briarcliff College, and the University of Arizona, where she studied drama.

Griffin met Dominick Dunne in Hartford, Connecticut. They were married in 1954 at Griffin's family ranch in Arizona and lived in New York City before relocating to Beverly Hills. Of their five children, two died in infancy. Among their children were Dominique Dunne and Griffin Dunne. The couple divorced in 1965.

== Death of Dominique and founding of Justice for Homicide Victims ==
The couple's daughter, actress Dominique Dunne, was strangled and murdered by ex-boyfriend John Sweeney at her home in October 1982. Actor David Packer, with whom Dunne was rehearsing for the miniseries V, found Sweeney kneeling over Dunne outside. Sweeney was arrested and Dunne was transported to Cedars-Sinai Medical Center. She was placed on life support immediately and never recovered. She was removed from life support by her parents on November 4, 1982.

On September 21, 1983, Sweeney was acquitted of second-degree murder, but he was convicted of voluntary manslaughter. Dunne's family protested the verdict as an "injustice."

One year later, Dunne and Marcella Leach founded California Center for Family Survivors of Homicide, a victim's rights group. Now known as Justice for Homicide Victims, the organization supports victims of homicide with legal support and navigation, counseling and referrals, and financial assistance.

In 1989, Dunne was awarded the Crime Victims Award by United States Attorney General Dick Thornburgh. Her work was also recognized by then-President George H. W. Bush at the White House.

== Later life ==
Dunne began suffering from multiple sclerosis during the early 1980s. In 1990, she left Beverly Hills and relocated to Nogales, where she built a 5,500-square-foot home on the site of her parents' former ranch. She died on January 9, 1997, shortly before her 65th birthday.
