= The Discoverers (film) =

2012 American dark comedy by Justin Schwarz

- Film poster
- Directed by: Justin Schwarz
- Written by: Justin Schwarz
- Produced by: Bob Gosse; Laura Kleger; Louise Lovegrove; Justin Schwarz
- Starring: Griffin Dunne; Madeleine Martin; Cara Buono; David Rasche; Stuart Margolin; Devon Graye; Dreama Walker; Scott Adsit; Becky Ann Baker; Ann Dowd; John C. McGinley
- Cinematography: Christopher Blauvelt
- Edited by: Geraud Brisson
- Music by: Aaron Mirman
- Production company: Quadratic Media
- Distributed by: Quadratic Media
- Release dates: October 6, 2012 (Hamptons); May 16, 2014
- Running time: 104 minutes
- Country: United States
- Language: English

The Discoverers is a 2012 American dark comedy directed and written by Justin Schwarz. The film stars Griffin Dunne, Madeleine Martin, and Cara Buono.

== Plot ==
Washed-up history professor Lewis Birch (Oscar and Emmy nominated Griffin Dunne) takes his begrudging teenage kids – Zoe (Madeleine Martin, “Californication”) and Jack (Devon Graye, “American Horror Stories”) – on a road trip to a conference in hopes of putting his career back on track. But, when Lewis’s estranged father Stanley (Emmy Award-winning Stuart Margolin) goes AWOL on a Lewis and Clark historical reenactment trek, Lewis is forced to make a family detour. The Birch family find themselves on a journey of discovery and connection as they make their own passage west.

== Cast ==
- Griffin Dunne as Lewis Birch
- Madeleine Martin as Zoe Birch
- Cara Buono as Nell Pope
- John C. McGinley as Bill Birch
- Stuart Margolin as Stanley Birch
- Devon Graye as Jack Birch
- Ann Dowd as Patti
- Dreama Walker as Abigail Marshall
- David Rasche as Cyrus Marshall
- Becky Ann Baker as Mary Marshall
- Scott Adsit as Harry Hardcore
- Todd Susman as Dr. Salter
- Hannah Dunne as Student

== Reception ==
The film was a New York Times Critic's Pick. On the review aggregator website Rotten Tomatoes, 85% of 26 critics' reviews are positive. The website's consensus reads: "The Discoverers is occasionally guilty of contrived silliness, but its humor and genuine warmth are more than enough to compensate for its modest shortcomings." Metacritic, which uses a weighted average, assigned the film a score of 62 out of 100, based on 10 critics, indicating "generally favorable" reviews.
