= Game 6 =

- Theatrical poster
- Directed by: Michael Hoffman
- Written by: Don DeLillo
- Produced by: Griffin Dunne; Amy Robinson; Bryan Iler
- Starring: Michael Keaton; Griffin Dunne; Shalom Harlow; Bebe Neuwirth; Catherine O'Hara; Harris Yulin; Robert Downey Jr.
- Cinematography: David M. Dunlap
- Edited by: Camilla Toniolo
- Music by: Yo La Tengo
- Production companies: Serenade Films; Double Play
- Distributed by: Kindred Media Group
- Release dates: January 2005 (Sundance); March 10, 2006 (United States)
- Running time: 83 minutes
- Country: United States
- Language: English
- Box office: $129,664

Game 6 (stylized as Game6) is a 2005 American comedy drama film directed by Michael Hoffman. It stars Michael Keaton, Robert Downey Jr., Bebe Neuwirth, Griffin Dunne, and Catherine O'Hara. The plot follows fictional playwright Nicky Rogan, who has a new stage play opening on the same day of the sixth game of the 1986 World Series. The screenplay, written in 1991, is Don DeLillo's first script to be made into a film. The soundtrack is written and performed by Yo La Tengo. The film premiered at the Sundance Film Festival and was given a limited theatrical release on March 10, 2006.

== Plot ==
Nicky Rogan has written several successful plays. It's now opening night of his latest effort and everyone around him assures him that this play will be his best yet. But as opening hour approaches, Rogan becomes anxious, influenced by another playwright whose last work was trashed by the local newspaper's new drama critic, Steven Schwimmer. Fearing his new play might get the same treatment from Schwimmer, Rogan resolves to kill the critic and procures a handgun with which to perform the deed.

Instead of attending the play's opening night, Rogan spends time in a bar, accompanied by a lady cab driver and her grandson; earlier in the evening she misidentified Rogan as a local, small-time hoodlum but he doesn't correct her misidentification.

They watch the crucial Game 6 of the 1986 World Series between the Boston Red Sox and the New York Mets. The Sox have won 3 games and could clinch the title by winning Game 6 but Rogan, a lifelong Sox fan, knows how easily the team can lose when they should win. He spends the evening waiting for the inevitable, even though the Sox are leading most of the time. When the inevitable does occur (due to an unexpected pair of errors at the end of the final inning), he snaps and leaves to take out his rage on the newspaper critic.

Rogan not only finds the critic but sees him in the early stages of deflowering the playwright's daughter. He begins firing wildly and is finally calmed when he learns the critic is equally devastated by the Sox's loss. They end up together, watching an interminable rerun of the final error by Bill Buckner on a small television set in the critic's apartment.

== Cast ==
- Michael Keaton as Nicky Rogan
- Robert Downey Jr. as Steven Schwimmer
- Ari Graynor as Laurel Rogan
- Bebe Neuwirth as Joanna Bourne
- Griffin Dunne as Elliott Litvak
- Shalom Harlow as Paisley Porter
- Nadia Dajani as Renee Simons
- Harris Yulin as Peter Redmond
- Roger Rees as Jack Haskins
- Tom Aldredge as Michael Rogan
- Lillias White as Toyota Moseby
- Amir Ali Said as Matthew
- Catherine O'Hara as Lillian Rogan
- Rock Kohli as Ramaswamy Choudhry
- John Tormey as George, Georgie, Giorgio
- Harry Bugin as Dodgie

== Production ==
Don DeLillo first wrote the script in 1991. The film went through a long period of development hell in which multiple directors expressed interest at different points, including Neil Jordan, Robert Altman, and Gore Verbinski.

Director Michael Hoffman got Bill Buckner's blessing before making the film.

Michael Keaton, a longtime friend of producer Griffin Dunne, was cast as the lead. The film was made as an independent effort and largely as a labor of love, with all the "name" players working for little more than scale (Keaton's salary was $100/day, for instance).

The film was shot on location in Manhattan. Hoffman paid out of his own pocket to enable filming of scenes at Shea Stadium. Filming took place over 18 days in the summer of 2004, on a budget of half a million dollars.

Vin Scully read his scene of dialogue over the phone.

== Release ==
The film premiered at the 2005 Sundance Film Festival. After going through a period of finding no distributors, Kindred Media Group expressed interest and bought the distribution rights. On March 10, 2006, the film was released in New York and Boston to mirror the 1986 World Series. The film was screened in only 4 theaters. Jeffrey D. Erb, the president of Kindred, said the film was difficult to market, but producers claimed Kindred did not properly promote the film.

The film went unreleased on home media and streaming for many years. On August 10, 2021, Serenade Films released the film on VOD.

== Reception ==
On Rotten Tomatoes the film holds a 62% approval rating based on 42 reviews, with an average rating of 5.9/10. The website's critics consensus reads: "Though packed with Don DeLillo's witty dialogue and bolstered by strong performances, particularly by lead Michael Keaton, Game 6 also suffers from uneven direction and overwrought symbolism."

Andrew O'Hehir of Salon gave a positive review, writing, "even if you know all too well what happened in that game between the Red Sox and the New York Mets, DeLillo and Hoffman make it seem both dramatic and momentous. I'm not wowed by the spoofy 'Taxi Driver' resolution, but for fans of DeLillo, Keaton and/or either team in that classic Series, this curious little picture is worth tracking down."

Roger Ebert gave the film three-and-a-half stars out of four. He praised the performances of Keaton and Downey Jr., saying of the former: DeLillo's "dialogue requires an actor who sounds like he understands what he is saying, and Keaton goes one better and convinces us he is generating it. Life for him is a play, he is the actor, his speech is the dialogue, and he deepens and dramatizes his experience by the way he talks about it".

Leonard Maltin gave the film two and a half stars, describing it as "a writer’s film if there ever was one".

== See also ==
- List of baseball films
