= Ghazi Albuliwi =

American actor

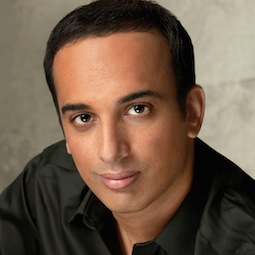
Ghazi Albuliwi

Ghazi Albuliwi is a Jordanian-born American actor, best known for his 2013 film Peace After Marriage, which he wrote, acted in, and directed. He also worked on the film West Bank Brooklyn.

== Early life ==
Ghazi Albuliwi was born in Jordan and moved to Brooklyn as an infant. His mother is from a village near Haifa, Israel. He believed that his family had fled in 1948. He spoke Arabic at home and had friends who were Latino, African-American, and Italian. He started doing stand-up comedy when he was 17.

== Peace After Marriage ==
Ghazi Albulwi was inspired to make this film while sitting at a cafe in Jerusalem, trying to make a comedy. When he saw a group of Israelis laughing, he was inspired to do something to change the notions of someone who happens to be Arab. Ghazi stated in an interview for the Huffington Post, "Call me idealistic, but at the moment, sitting near these Israelis, I said to myself, 'Write a movie where they would laugh and forget you were Arab.'"

The film Peace After Marriage had its world premiere at the 2013 Abu Dhabi Film Festival. The film is about a Muslim Palestinian-American man in New York who marries an Israeli Jewish woman who is desperate for a Green Card. On November 30, it was featured at the Jerusalem Jewish Film Festival. According to The New York Times, Peace After Marriage is "a $1 million Turkish-French-American production that has picked up several festival awards". Peace after Marriage won the "Best Script" award in 2010 when it went through the 'Tribecca All Access program' through the Tribecca Film Institute. Additional funding came post-production; Good Lap Production helped him complete the music score.

Hiam Abbass played the role of Albulwi's mother in the film. Ghazi Albulwi was a finalist for the Nicholl Fellowship award given by the Academy of Motion Picture Arts and Sciences. Ghazi Albulwi was a finalist for his role as Arafat.

== Themes ==
Ghazi Albulwi is known for using themes relating to non-belonging in his works.

When questioned about a solution for when the cultures clash with one another, Ghazi Albuwi stated, "Sexual jihad: one big orgy with the Arabs and the Jews, where we release all our hostilities, and I hope I’m right in the middle of it." After this humorous statement, some journalists ended up canceling the interviews.
