= Killing of Dominique Dunne =

1982 murder in West Hollywood, California, US

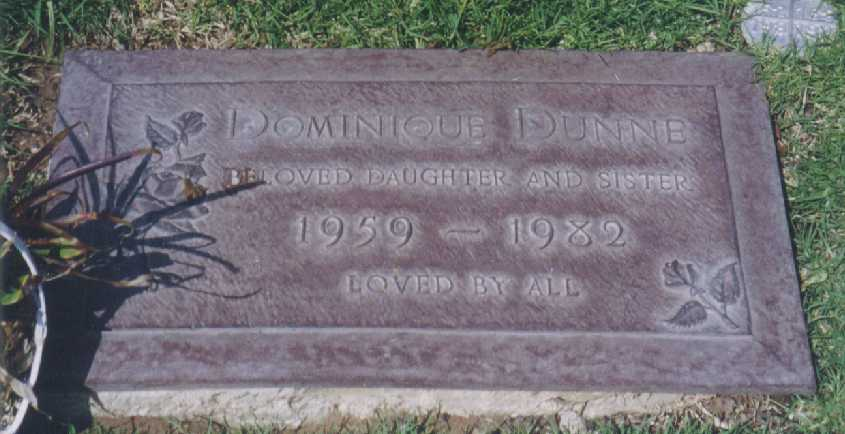
- Headstone of Dunne's grave
- Location: West Hollywood, California, U.S.
- Date: October 30, 1982
- Victim: Dominique Dunne
- Perpetrator: John Sweeney
- Charges: Murder
- Convictions: Voluntary manslaughter
- Judge: Burton S. Katz

On October 30, 1982, 22-year-old Dominique Ellen Dunne, an American actress, was strangled outside her home by her ex-boyfriend, John Thomas Sweeney (born October 12, 1956). She fell into a coma as a result and was taken off life support five days later, on November 4, 1982 resulting in her death. In a court case that gained significant media coverage, Sweeney was convicted of voluntary manslaughter in Dunne's death and sentenced to six and a half years, serving two and a half years of the sentence before being released on parole.

== Background ==
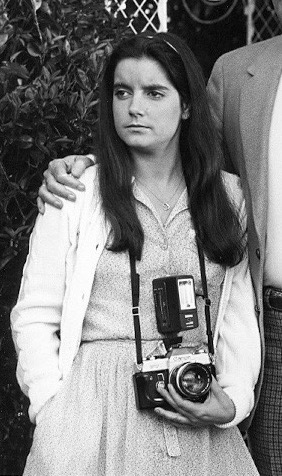
Dominique Dunne in 1981

Dominique Dunne was born in Santa Monica, the youngest child of Ellen Beatriz "Lenny" (née Griffin), a ranching heiress, and Dominick Dunne, a writer, producer, and actor. Dunne had Irish and Mexican ancestry. Her father was born and raised in an Irish Catholic family with her maternal grandfather, an Irish-American and her maternal grandmother a Mexican who was from Sonora. She embarked on an acting career which included roles in several TV series and the horror film Poltergeist (1982), the latter being her best-known role.

Dunne met John Thomas Sweeney, a sous-chef at the restaurant Ma Maison, at a party in 1981. After a few weeks of dating, they moved into a one-bedroom house together on Rangely Avenue in West Hollywood. Due to Sweeney's jealousy and possessiveness, however, the relationship quickly deteriorated. The couple frequently fought, and Sweeney began to physically abuse Dunne. According to one account, during an argument on August 27, 1982, he yanked handfuls of her hair out by the roots. Frightened, Dunne fled to her mother's house, where Sweeney showed up and began to bang on the door and windows, demanding to be let in. Dunne's mother told him to leave and threatened to call the police. A few days later, Dunne returned to the home she shared with Sweeney, and the two resumed their relationship.

During another argument at their home on September 26, 1982, Sweeney grabbed Dunne by the throat, threw her on the floor, and began to strangle her. A friend who was staying with the couple at the time heard "loud gagging sounds" and ran into the room where Dunne was being attacked. Dunne told the friend that Sweeney had tried to kill her, but Sweeney denied the claim and asked Dunne to come back to bed. She pretended that she was going to comply with his request, but snuck out of the bathroom window. When Sweeney heard Dunne start her car, he ran out and jumped on the hood. Dunne stopped the car long enough for Sweeney to jump off the hood, and then she drove away. For the next few days, she stayed with her mother and at the homes of some of her friends. She later called Sweeney and ended the relationship. After he moved out, Dunne had the locks changed and moved back into their Rangely Avenue home.

== Murder ==
On October 30, 1982, a few weeks after Sweeney and Dunne broke up, Dunne was at her West Hollywood home rehearsing for the miniseries V with actor David Packer. While she was speaking to a female friend on the phone, Sweeney had the operator break into the conversation. Dunne told her friend, "Oh God, it's Sweeney. Let me get him off the phone." Ten minutes later, Sweeney showed up at Dunne's home. After speaking to him through the locked door, Dunne agreed to speak to him on the porch while Packer remained inside. Outside, the two began to argue. Later, Packer said that he heard smacking sounds, two screams, and a thud. Concerned, he called the police, but was told Dunne's home was outside their jurisdiction. Packer then phoned a friend and told him that if she was found dead, John Sweeney was her killer. Packer left the home through the back entrance, approached the driveway, and saw Sweeney in some nearby bushes, kneeling over Dunne. Sweeney told Packer to call the police. When police arrived, Sweeney met them in the driveway, with his hands in the air, and stated, "I killed my girlfriend, and I tried to kill myself." Sweeney later testified that he and Dunne had argued, but he could not remember what happened after their exchange. He claimed that he could only recall being on top of her, with his hands around her neck.

On the night of the attack, responding officers found Sweeney standing by Dunne's unconscious body in her driveway. A spokesman for the West Hollywood sheriff later told reporters that Sweeney told officers, "I killed my girlfriend." He was immediately arrested and charged with attempted murder. Those charges were dropped after Dunne's death, however, and subsequently, Sweeney was charged with first-degree murder, to which he pleaded not guilty. Sweeney was later charged with assault with intent to do great bodily harm, when during a preliminary trial hearing, he admitted that Dunne and he had a physical altercation on September 26, 1982, the day before she filmed an episode of Hill Street Blues, in which she appeared with visible bruises on her face and body. He denied assaulting Dunne, however, claiming that she accidentally incurred the bruises when he tried to prevent her from leaving their home.

Dunne was transported to Cedars-Sinai Medical Center, where she was placed on life support. She never regained consciousness. Over the following days, doctors performed brain scans, which revealed that due to oxygen deprivation, she had no brain activity. On November 4, her parents consented to have her removed from life support. At the request of her mother, Dunne's kidneys and heart were donated to transplant recipients. Her funeral was held on November 6 at the Church of the Good Shepherd in Beverly Hills. Her godfather, Martin Manulis, delivered the eulogy. She was cremated and thereafter laid to rest in the lawn at Westwood Village Memorial Park Cemetery.

== Trial ==
Sweeney's trial began in August 1983 and was presided over by Judge Burton S. Katz. During the trial, Sweeney took the stand in his own defense. He testified that he had not intended to harm Dunne the night he arrived at her home. He claimed they had reconciled, were planning to move back in together, and had daily discussions about getting married and having children. On the night of October 30, Sweeney said that Dunne had abruptly changed her mind about a reconciliation, telling him that she had been leading him on and lying to him about getting back together. At that point, Sweeney said he "exploded and lunged toward her." Sweeney claimed to have no recollection of attacking Dunne until he discovered that he was on top of her with his hands around her neck. He then realized that she was not breathing. Sweeney said that he attempted to revive her by making her walk around, but she fell down. He then attempted to give her CPR, which caused Dunne to vomit. Sweeney said that he also vomited, ran into Dunne's house, and consumed two bottles of pills in an attempt to kill himself. He then returned to the driveway, where he laid down beside Dunne, waiting for the pills to take effect. Sweeney's court-appointed attorney, Michael Adelson, argued that his client's actions were neither premeditated nor were they executed with malice. Instead, he maintained that Sweeney, provoked by Dunne's alleged deception, acted in the "heat of passion." Dunne's family disputed Sweeney's claim that she had reconciled with him. They insisted that he went to Dunne's home on October 30 in an effort to persuade her to reconcile after she told him that their breakup was permanent.

The prosecution and the police investigators dismissed Sweeney's version of events, since no physical evidence was found that he had consumed pills in a suicide attempt at the time of his arrest. Upon their arrival, the police said they found Sweeney's demeanor to be both "calm and collected." Deputy Frank DeMilio, the first officer to arrive on the scene, testified that Sweeney told him, "Man, I blew it. I killed her. I didn't think I choked her that hard, but I don't know, I just kept on choking her. I just lost my temper and blew it again." The medical examiner who performed Dunne's autopsy determined that the victim had been strangled for at least three minutes. Given those results of the autopsy, the police and prosecutors dismissed the defense's argument that Sweeney acted unconsciously, reasoning that, in the three minutes in which Sweeney strangled Dunne, he had ample opportunity to regain control of his actions which might have saved Dunne's life.

To establish a history of Sweeney's violent behavior, the prosecution called one of Sweeney's ex-girlfriends, Lillian Pierce, and asked her to testify. At the request of Sweeney's attorney, Pierce did not testify in the jury's presence. She stated that she and Sweeney had dated on and off from 1977 to 1980. Pierce claimed that during the relationship, Sweeney had assaulted her on ten separate occasions and, as a result, she was hospitalized twice for the injuries that she sustained. During one of the assaults, Pierce sustained a perforated eardrum and a collapsed lung. She later sustained a broken nose. During Pierce's testimony, Sweeney became enraged, jumped up from his seat, and ran towards the door leading to the judge's chambers. Two bailiffs and four armed guards subdued him. Sweeney was then handcuffed to his chair and began to cry. He apologized to the court for the outburst which Judge Katz accepted.

Attorney Michael Adelson requested that Judge Katz rule Pierce's testimony inadmissible because it was prejudicial. Judge Katz granted the request and the jury learned about Pierce's testimony only after the trial. Katz also refused to allow testimony from Dunne's mother, Ellen Dunne, as well as Dunne's friends, citing their statements about Sweeney's abusive nature as hearsay. On August 29, defense attorney Michael Adelson requested that Judge Katz rule that the court lacked sufficient evidence to try Sweeney on the charge of first-degree murder because predetermination was not established. Judge Katz granted the request and, as such, the jurors were instructed to consider the charges of manslaughter or second-degree murder. DDA Steven Barshop later said that this decision, along with Judge Katz's previous rulings barring the testimonies of both Sweeney's ex-girlfriend and Dunne's mother and friends, seriously undermined the prosecution's case against Sweeney.

On September 21, 1983, after eight days of deliberation, the jury acquitted John Sweeney of second-degree murder, but found him guilty of the lesser charge of voluntary manslaughter. He was also convicted of misdemeanor assault for the altercation with Dunne that occurred on September 26, 1982. Dunne's family was outraged by the verdict, calling it an "injustice." After Judge Katz excused the jury and commented on the judicial system being upheld, Dominick Dunne, the victim's father, yelled, "Not for our family, Judge Katz!" Before he left the courtroom, Dominick Dunne accused Judge Katz of purposely withholding Sweeney's ex-girlfriend's testimony from the jury which would have established his violent history with women. Victims for Victims, a victims' rights group that was founded by actress Theresa Saldana, protested against the verdict by staging a march outside the courthouse. Afterward, several media outlets also debated the events of the trial and the verdict. Several outlets criticized Judge Katz's rulings which many argued favored the defense. One local L.A. TV station polled viewers who rated Judge Katz the fourth-worst judge in Los Angeles County.

On November 7, Sweeney was sentenced to six years in prison for manslaughter which was the maximum sentence he could have received, with an additional six months for the assault charge. At Sweeney's sentencing, Judge Katz criticized the jury's verdict of manslaughter, stating he felt that Dunne's death was "A case, pure and simple, of murder. Murder with malice." The jury's foreman, Paul Speigel, later told the media that his fellow jurors and he were surprised by Judge Katz's criticism and he called his comment "a cheap shot". Speigel felt that Judge Katz's criticism did not stem from their verdict, but from the harsh criticism he received afterward. Speigel went on to say that had the jury been provided with the opportunity to hear all of the evidence, they would have convicted Sweeney of murder.

== Aftermath ==
On the advice of Marie Brenner, Dominick Dunne kept a journal throughout the trial. His journal writings were later published in an article entitled "Justice: A Father's Account of the Trial of his Daughter's Killer" that was featured in the March 1984 issue of Vanity Fair. A year after her daughter's death, Dominique's mother, Ellen "Lenny" Dunne, founded Justice for Homicide Victims, a victim's rights advocacy group.

After the trial, Sweeney was incarcerated in a medium-security prison in Susanville. He was released on parole in September 1986 after serving only two and a half years of his six-and-a-half-year sentence. After his release, Sweeney was hired as head chef at an upscale restaurant in Santa Monica, California. After he discovered where Sweeney was working, Dunne's brother, Griffin, and her mother, Lenny, stood outside the restaurant, where they handed flyers out to patrons that read: "The food you will eat tonight was cooked by the hands that killed Dominique Dunne." Sweeney eventually quit his job because of the protests staged by Dunne's family, and he moved out of Los Angeles.

In the mid-1990s, Dominick Dunne was contacted by a Florida physician who came across an article that Dunne wrote about Dominique's death. The doctor informed Dunne that his daughter had recently become engaged to a chef who went by the name of John Sweeney and inquired if that man was the same man who was responsible for Dominique's death. The man was later identified as the same John Sweeney, and to protect the young woman now engaged to him, Dunne's brother, Griffin, contacted her and asked her to reconsider. Subsequently, Sweeney accused the Dunnes of harassing him, and in an effort to avoid further altercations, he changed his name. In later interviews in which Dominick Dunne discussed his daughter's murder, the writer shared that for a time he employed the services of PI Anthony Pellicano and asked him to follow Sweeney and report on his actions and whereabouts. According to Dunne's father, Pellicano reported that Sweeney had moved to the Pacific Northwest, assumed the name John Maura, and continued to work as a chef.
