= After Hours (film) =

1985 film by Martin Scorsese

- Theatrical release poster by Marvin Mattelson
- Directed by: Martin Scorsese
- Written by: Joseph Minion
- Produced by: Amy Robinson; Griffin Dunne; Robert F. Colesberry
- Starring: Griffin Dunne; Rosanna Arquette; Verna Bloom; Thomas Chong; Linda Fiorentino; Teri Garr; John Heard; Richard Cheech Marin; Catherine O'Hara
- Cinematography: Michael Ballhaus
- Edited by: Thelma Schoonmaker
- Music by: Howard Shore
- Production company: Double Play
- Distributed by: The Geffen Company (through Warner Bros.)
- Release date: September 13, 1985
- Running time: 97 minutes
- Country: United States
- Language: English
- Budget: $4.5 million
- Box office: $10.6 million

After Hours is a 1985 American neo-noir black comedy film directed by Martin Scorsese, written by Joseph Minion, and produced by Amy Robinson, Griffin Dunne, and Robert F. Colesberry. Dunne stars as Paul Hackett, an office worker who experiences a series of misadventures while attempting to make his way home from Manhattan's SoHo district during the night.

After Hours was released by The Geffen Company through Warner Bros. on September 13, 1985. The film grossed $10.6 million against a $4.5 million budget and was critically acclaimed. It is now considered to be a cult classic.

The film won the Independent Spirit Award for Best Feature. Scorsese won the Cannes Film Festival Award for Best Director and the Independent Spirit Award for Best Director for the film.

== Plot ==
Late one evening, mild-mannered New York computer clerk Paul Hackett strikes up a conversation with Marcy Franklin at a café. Paul is intrigued by the quirky stranger – whose roommate, sculptor Kiki Bridges, makes and sells plaster-of-Paris paperweights resembling bagels – and accepts her phone number. Later, Paul takes a taxi to her SoHo apartment, but his only $20 bill flies out the taxi window, leaving him virtually penniless and earning the driver's wrath.

At the apartment, Kiki is working on a large papier-mâché sculpture of a screaming man while Marcy is out. When Marcy returns, her erratic behavior and Paul's discovery of burn cream and ominous photos convince him that she is severely disfigured and unstable. Unnerved, he abandons the date. Attempting to take the subway home, he learns the fare has jumped at midnight, and he cannot afford to pay. Paul goes to a bar tended by a man named Tom, who lends Paul his apartment key to retrieve the key for the bar's cash register, but Paul floods the bathroom and is confronted by suspicious residents. On the street, Paul confronts two thieves hauling away Kiki's sculpture and chases them off. Returning the sculpture to the apartment, he discovers that Marcy has committed suicide by overdosing on Seconal. Her body shows no burns, disproving Paul's misconceptions about her.

On the way out, Paul grabs a note from Kiki inviting him and Marcy to Club Berlin. On his way there, Paul runs into the bar's waitress Julie, who brings him up to her apartment and flirts aggressively. After Paul scorns her, she brands him the neighborhood burglar via handmade wanted posters. Paul is denied entry into Club Berlin for lacking a mohawk, and punks chase him with clippers. After retrieving his $20 bill from Kiki's sculpture, he encounters the original taxi driver, who robs him. Paul meets a Mister Softee ice cream truck driver named Gail, who initially offers aid but later joins the mob hunting him after seeing Julie's posters. Paul approaches a man for help, but his plea is mistaken for a sexual proposition. He then calls the police, but is ignored.

Paul ducks into the now-empty Club Berlin. Exhausted, bedraggled, and ranting, Paul drops his last coin into the jukebox for Peggy Lee's "Is That All There Is?", and dances with June, an older sculptress living beneath the club. June hides him from the mob by covering him in papier-mâché, disguising him as a sculpture resembling Kiki's screaming man, but the plaster hardens. The two thieves break in, mistake the rigid Paul for the sculpture they dropped earlier, and haul him away in their van. During a sharp turn uptown, the rear doors swing open; Paul tumbles out, smashing onto the pavement directly in front of his Midtown office building just before dawn. The impact shatters the plaster. Dazed, he staggers inside, sits at his desk, and stares at his computer terminal as it boots up to greet him for another day of work.

== Cast ==
- Griffin Dunne as Paul Hackett
- Rosanna Arquette as Marcy Franklin
- Verna Bloom as June
- Tommy Chong as Pepe
- Linda Fiorentino as Kiki Bridges
- Teri Garr as Julie
- John Heard as Tom Schorr
- Cheech Marin as Neil
- Catherine O'Hara as Gail
- Dick Miller as Pete, Diner Waiter
- Will Patton as Horst
- Bronson Pinchot as Lloyd
- Rocco Sisto as Coffee Shop Cashier
- Larry Block as Taxi Driver
- Victor Argo as Diner Cashier
- Clarence Felder as Club Berlin Bouncer
- Martin Scorsese as Club Berlin Searchlight Operator

== Themes and motifs ==
This film belongs in a grouping that revolves around a young working professional who is placed under threat, named the "yuppie nightmare cycle", a subgenre of films which combines screwball comedy and film noir. Critics Lawrence Friedman and Emanuel Levy present a psychoanalytic view of the film; Paul is constantly emasculated by women in the film: by Kiki with her sexual aggression and lust for masochism, Marcy turning down his sexual advances, Julie and Gail turning a vigilante mob on him, and June trapping him in plaster. There are many references to castration within the film, most of which are shown when women are present. In the bathroom in Terminal Bar where Julie first encounters Paul, there is an image scrawled on the wall of a shark biting a man's erect penis. Marcy makes a reference to her husband using a double entendre when saying, "I broke the whole thing off" when talking about their sex life.

Michael Rabiger sees mythological symbolism as a primary theme of the film, stating: "The hero of Scorsese's dark comedy, After Hours is like a rat trying to escape from a labyrinth. Indeed there is a caged rat in one scene where Paul finds himself trapped in a talkative woman's apartment. The film could be plotted out as a labyrinthine journey, each compartment holding out the promise of a particular experience, almost all illusory and misleading."

== Production ==
After Hours was originally to be directed by Tim Burton after Dunne and Robinson were impressed with his short film Vincent, but Burton willingly stepped aside when Scorsese expressed interest.

Paramount Pictures' abandonment of The Last Temptation of Christ was a huge disappointment to Scorsese, and spurred him to focus on independent companies and smaller projects. Scorsese's most recent film, The King of Comedy, also failed at the box office. He stated in an interview with Michael Wilson that "Marty, it's probably time you earned a bit of money".

The opportunity to direct After Hours was offered to Scorsese by his lawyer Jay Julien, who put him through Griffin Dunne and Amy Robinson's Double Play Company. The project was called One Night in Soho and it was based on a script by Joseph Minion. The screenplay, originally titled Lies after a 1982 Joe Frank monologue that inspired it, was written as part of an assignment for his film course at Columbia University. According to Frank, he was not asked for rights to the story, asking "what must the screenwriter have been thinking to place himself in such jeopardy?" Minion was 26 years old at the time the film was produced. The script finally became After Hours after Scorsese made his final amendments.

One of Scorsese's contributions involved the dialogue between Paul and the doorman at Club Berlin, which was inspired by Franz Kafka's "Before the Law", one of the short stories included in his novel The Trial. As Scorsese explained to Paul Attanasio, the short story reflected his frustration toward the production of The Last Temptation of Christ.

Steven Spielberg suggested that the film end with the statue falling off the truck and breaking into thousands of pieces. Paul is not inside the statue and is instead on the expressway yelling "They're coming to get you! The invaders are coming!". However, Terry Gilliam told him to cut that scene.

After Hours was the first fictional film directed by Scorsese since Alice Doesn't Live Here Anymore in 1974 not to feature Robert De Niro.

British director Michael Powell took part in the production of the film, and he and editor Thelma Schoonmaker married soon afterward. Nobody was sure how the film should end. Powell said that Paul must finish up back at work, but this was initially dismissed as too unlikely and difficult. They tried many other endings, and a few were even filmed, but the only one that everyone felt really worked was to have Paul finish up back at work just as the new day was starting.

== Music ==
The score for After Hours was composed by Howard Shore. Although an official soundtrack album was not released, many of Shore's cues appear on the 2009 album Howard Shore: Collector's Edition Vol. 1. In addition to the score, other music credited at the end of the film is:

1. Symphony in D Major, K. 95 (K. 73n), first movement: attributed to Wolfgang Amadeus Mozart
2. "Air on the G String (Air From Suite No. 3)" Composed by Johann Sebastian Bach
3. "En la Cueva" Performed by Cuadro Flamenco
4. "Sevillanas" Composed and performed by Manitas de Plata
5. "Night and Day" Written by Cole Porter
6. "Body and Soul" Composed by Johnny Green
7. "Quando quando quando" Music by Tony Renis, Lyrics by Pat Boone
8. "Someone to Watch Over Me" Lyrics by Ira Gershwin, Music by George Gershwin, performed by Robert & Johnny
9. "You're Mine" Written by Robert Carr and Johnny Mitchell, performed by Robert & Johnny
10. "We Belong Together" Performed by Robert & Johnny
11. "Angel Baby" Written by Rosie Hamlin, performed by Rosie and the Originals
12. "Last Train to Clarksville" Written by Boyce and Hart, performed by the Monkees
13. "Chelsea Morning" Composed and performed by Joni Mitchell
14. "I Don't Know Where I Stand" Composed and performed by Joni Mitchell
15. "Over the Mountain; Across the Sea" Composed by Rex Garvin, performed by Johnnie and Joe
16. "One Summer Night" Written by Danny Webb, Performed by the Danleers
17. "Pay to Cum" Written and performed by Bad Brains
18. "Is That All There Is?" Composed by Jerry Leiber and Mike Stoller, performed by Peggy Lee

== Reception ==
After Hours grossed $10.6 million in the United States, and was critically acclaimed. It has since been considered an "underrated" entry in the director's filmography. The film won Scorsese the Best Director award at the 1986 Cannes Film Festival and allowed him to take a hiatus from the tumultuous development of The Last Temptation of Christ.

Film critic Roger Ebert gave After Hours four out of four stars. He praised the film as one of the year's best and said it "continues Scorsese's attempt to combine comedy and satire with unrelenting pressure and a sense of all-pervading paranoia." He later added it to his "Great Movies" list. On At the Movies, Ebert's colleague Gene Siskel said he enjoyed the film, but lamented the late introduction of the "light comedy" characters—those played by Garr, O'Hara, and Cheech & Chong—who he felt robbed the picture of its "hard New York edge." In The New York Times, critic Vincent Canby gave the film a mixed review, calling it an "entertaining tease, with individually arresting sequences that are well acted by Mr. Dunne and the others, but which leave you feeling somewhat conned."

On the review aggregator website Rotten Tomatoes, the film has an approval rating of 90% based on 67 reviews, with an average rating of 7.9/10. The site's critical consensus reads: "Bursting with frantic energy and tinged with black humor, After Hours is a masterful – and often overlooked – detour in Martin Scorsese's filmography." On Metacritic, the film has a weighted average score of 89 out of 100 based on reviews from nine critics, indicating "universal acclaim".

=== Accolades ===
Association	Category	Recipient	Result	Ref.
BAFTA Awards	Best Actress in a Supporting Role	Rosanna Arquette	Nominated	
Cannes Film Festival	Palme d'Or	Martin Scorsese	Nominated	
Cannes Film Festival	Best Director	Martin Scorsese	Won	
Casting Society of America Awards	Best Casting for Feature Film – Comedy	Mary Colquhoun	Nominated	
César Awards	Best Foreign Film	Martin Scorsese	Nominated	
Golden Globe Awards	Best Actor in a Motion Picture – Comedy or Musical	Griffin Dunne	Nominated	
Independent Spirit Awards	Best Feature	Robert F. Colesberry; Griffin Dunne; Amy Robinson	Won	
Independent Spirit Awards	Best Director	Martin Scorsese	Won	
Independent Spirit Awards	Best Screenplay	Joseph Minion	Nominated	
Independent Spirit Awards	Best Female Lead	Rosanna Arquette	Nominated	
Independent Spirit Awards	Best Cinematography	Michael Ballhaus	Nominated	
National Society of Film Critics Awards	Best Cinematography	Michael Ballhaus	Nominated	

== Home media ==
Warner Home Video released After Hours on VHS and Betamax in 1986, and both widescreen and open matte NTSC LaserDiscs. It has also been released on DVD. On July 11, 2023, the film was released on 4K UHD and Blu-ray by The Criterion Collection.

== Legacy ==
After Hours served as an inspiration for the 2020 album After Hours by Canadian singer the Weeknd. The film also inspired the 2021 Ted Lasso episode "Beard After Hours".

== See also ==
- List of American films of 1985

== Works cited ==
- Wilson, Michael (2011). Scorsese On Scorsese. Cahiers du Cinéma. ISBN 9782866427023.
