= List of Hollywood novels =

American regional literary genre

This is a list of Hollywood novels i.e., notable fiction about the American film and television industry and associated culture. The Hollywood novel is not to be confused with the Los Angeles novel, which is a novel set in Los Angeles and environs but not overtly about the movie business and its effect on the lives of industry participants and moviegoers. For instance, the works of Paul Beatty, Neal Stephenson's Snow Crash, and Aldous Huxley's Ape and Essence are Los Angeles novels but not Hollywood novels; The Oxford Companion to English Literature deems Nathanael West's The Day of the Locust a standard example of the Hollywood novel.

The Hollywood novel genre dates to 1916 and is the "only American regional genre determined by a specific industry." Hollywood novels portray the entertainment industry as "glitzy, powerful, and often sleazy." According to the New York Society Library, "Yes, there is a part of Los Angeles called Hollywood, but the Hollywood of our imagination is so much more. It is the locus of the motion picture industry. Home to stars and producers and writers. A glamorous place. A place that is quintessentially American—where strivers and connivers can reinvent themselves and where there is always the possibility of being discovered. For better or worse, it has helped to define our country to ourselves and to the world. It is easy to see why writers have taken it up as a subject so frequently."

According to author Michael Friedman in Publishers Weekly, "My informal taxonomy revealed that, as far as subject is concerned, Hollywood novels tend to fall into the following loose categories: moguls (Fitzgerald), divas (McCourt, Vidal), train wrecks (Stone, Didion), ingénues en route to stardom (Lambert), foolish dreams of being discovered (West, McCoy), and Brits who have had enough of our philistine ways and ersatz culture and return home to civilization (Waugh, Wodehouse)."

Author	Title	Year
Katherine Albert	Remember Valerie March	1939
Jane Allen	I Lost My Girlish Laughter	1938
Clive Barker	Coldheart Canyon	2001
Cal R. Barnes	True Grandeur	2017
William Boyd	The New Confessions	1987
Ray Bradbury	A Graveyard for Lunatics	1990
Christopher Bram	Father of Frankenstein	1996
Gwen Bristow	Tomorrow Is Forever	1943
Brock Brower	The Late Great Creature	1971
Charles Bukowski	Hollywood	1989
Edgar Rice Burroughs	The Girl from Hollywood	1922
James M. Cain	Serenade	1937
Don Carpenter	A Couple of Comedians	1979
Don Carpenter	The True Life Story of Jody McKeegan	1975
Don Carpenter	Turnaround	1981
Robert Carson	Love Affair	1958
Raymond Chandler	The Little Sister	1949
Jackie Collins	Hollywood Wives	1983
Ray Connolly	Shadows on a Wall	1995
Robert Crais	Lullaby Town	1992
Charles Dennis	The Dealmakers	1981
Joan Didion	Play It as It Lays	1970
Dominick Dunne	An Inconvenient Woman	1990
Dominick Dunne	Another City, Not My Own	1997
John Gregory Dunne	True Confessions	1977
John Gregory Dunne	Playland	1994
James Ellroy	The Big Nowhere	1988
James Ellroy	The Black Dahlia	1987
James Ellroy	L.A. Confidential	1990
James Ellroy	White Jazz	1992
Henry Farrell	What Ever Happened to Baby Jane?	1960
Peter Farrelly	The Comedy Writer	1998
Carrie Fisher	Postcards From the Edge	1987
Steve Fisher	I Wake Up Screaming	1941
F. Scott Fitzgerald	The Last Tycoon	1941
F. Scott Fitzgerald	The Pat Hobby Stories	1962
Paula Fox	The Western Coast	1972
Daniel Fuchs	The Golden West	1989
C.W. Gortner	Marlene	2016
Richard Grenier	The Marrakesh One-Two	1983
Doris Grumbach	The Missing Person	1981
Richard Hallas (Eric Knight)	You Play the Black and the Red Comes Up	1938
MacDonald Harris	Screenplay	1982
Alfred Hayes	My Face for the World to See	1958
Tom E. Huff	Marabelle	1980
Aldous Huxley	After Many a Summer	1939
Clive James	The Silver Castle	1996
Jay Richard Kennedy	Prince Bart	1952
Amanda Lee Koe	Delayed Rays of a Star	2019
Michael Korda	Queenie	1985
Gavin Lambert	The Goodbye People	1971
Gavin Lambert	Inside Daisy Clover	1963
Gavin Lambert	Running Time	1982
Gavin Lambert	The Slide Area	1959
Janet Leigh	The Dream Factory	2002
Janet Leigh	House of Destiny	1995
Elmore Leonard	Get Shorty	1990
Anita Loos	A Mouse Is Born	1951
Anita Loos	No Mother to Guide Her	1961
Norman Mailer	The Deer Park	1955
Alan Marcus	Of Streets and Stars	1960
Anthony Marra	Mercury Pictures Presents	2023
Armistead Maupin	Maybe the Moon	1992
James McCourt	Kaye Warfaring in "Avenged"	1985
Horace McCoy	I Should Have Stayed Home	1938
Horace McCoy	They Shoot Horses, Don't They?	1935
Larry McMurtry	Somebody's Darling	1978
Rasheed Newson	There's Only One Sin in Hollywood	2026
Jennifer Niven	Hollywood Blonde	2014
Joyce Carol Oates	Blonde	2000
Darcy O'Brien	A Way of Life, Like Any Other	1977
John O'Hara	Hope of Heaven	1938
John O'Hara	The Big Laugh	1962
Stewart O'Nan	West of Sunset	2015
James Patterson	Mary, Mary	2006
Tim Powers	Medusa's Web	2016
Taylor Jenkins Reid	The Seven Husbands of Evelyn Hugo	2017
Harold Robbins	The Carpetbaggers	1961
Harold Robbins	The Dream Merchants	1949
Theodore Roszak	Flicker	1991
Thomas Sanchez	The Zoot Suit Murders	1978
Budd Schulberg	The Disenchanted	1950
Budd Schulberg	What Makes Sammy Run?	1941
Pat Silver-Lasky	Ride The Tiger	2010
Amy Sohn	The Actress	2014
Martha Southgate	Third Girl from the Left	2006
Matthew Specktor	American Dream Machine	2014
C.K. Stead	Sister Hollywood	1989
Robert Stone	Children of Light	1986
Jacqueline Susann	Valley of the Dolls	1966
Adriana Trigiani	All the Stars in the Heavens	2016
Gore Vidal	Hollywood	1990
Peter Viertel	White Hunter Black Heart	1953
Bruce Wagner	Dead Stars	2012
Bruce Wagner	I'm Losing You	1996
Nathanael West	The Day of the Locust	1939
Harry Leon Wilson	Merton of the Movies	1922
Gary K. Wolf	Who Censored Roger Rabbit?	1981

== Novels set in satires of Hollywood ==
Author	Title	Year
James Robert Baker	Boy Wonder	1988
Steve Erickson	Zeroville	2007
Michael Friedman	Martian Dawn	2006
Michael Grothaus	Epiphany Jones	2016
Rupert Hughes	City of Angels	1941
Geoff Nicholson	The Hollywood Dodo	2004
Terry Southern	Blue Movie	1970
Michael Tolkin	The Player	1988
Gore Vidal	Myra Breckinridge	1968
Gore Vidal	Myron	1974
Bruce Wagner	Force Majeure	1991
Bruce Wagner	I'll Let You Go	2002
Bruce Wagner	Still Holding	2003
Evelyn Waugh	The Loved One	1948
P. G. Wodehouse	Laughing Gas	1936
Charles Yu	Interior Chinatown	2020

== See also ==
- Bibliography of Los Angeles
