= Chateau Marmont =

Hotel in Los Angeles, California

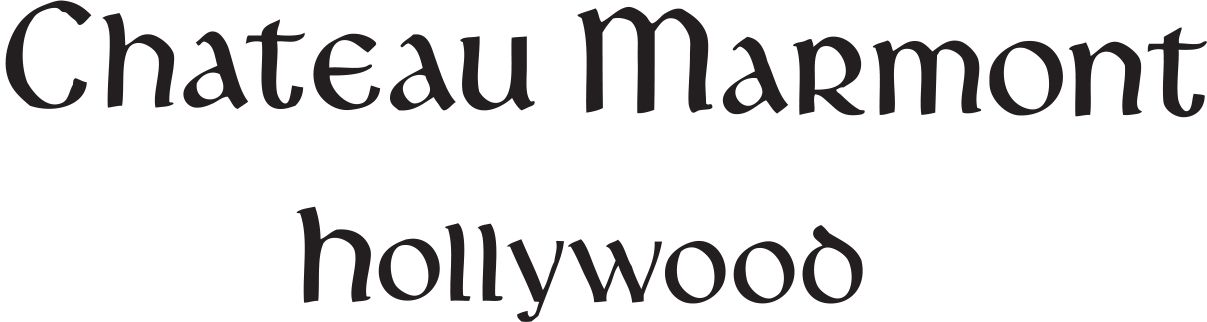

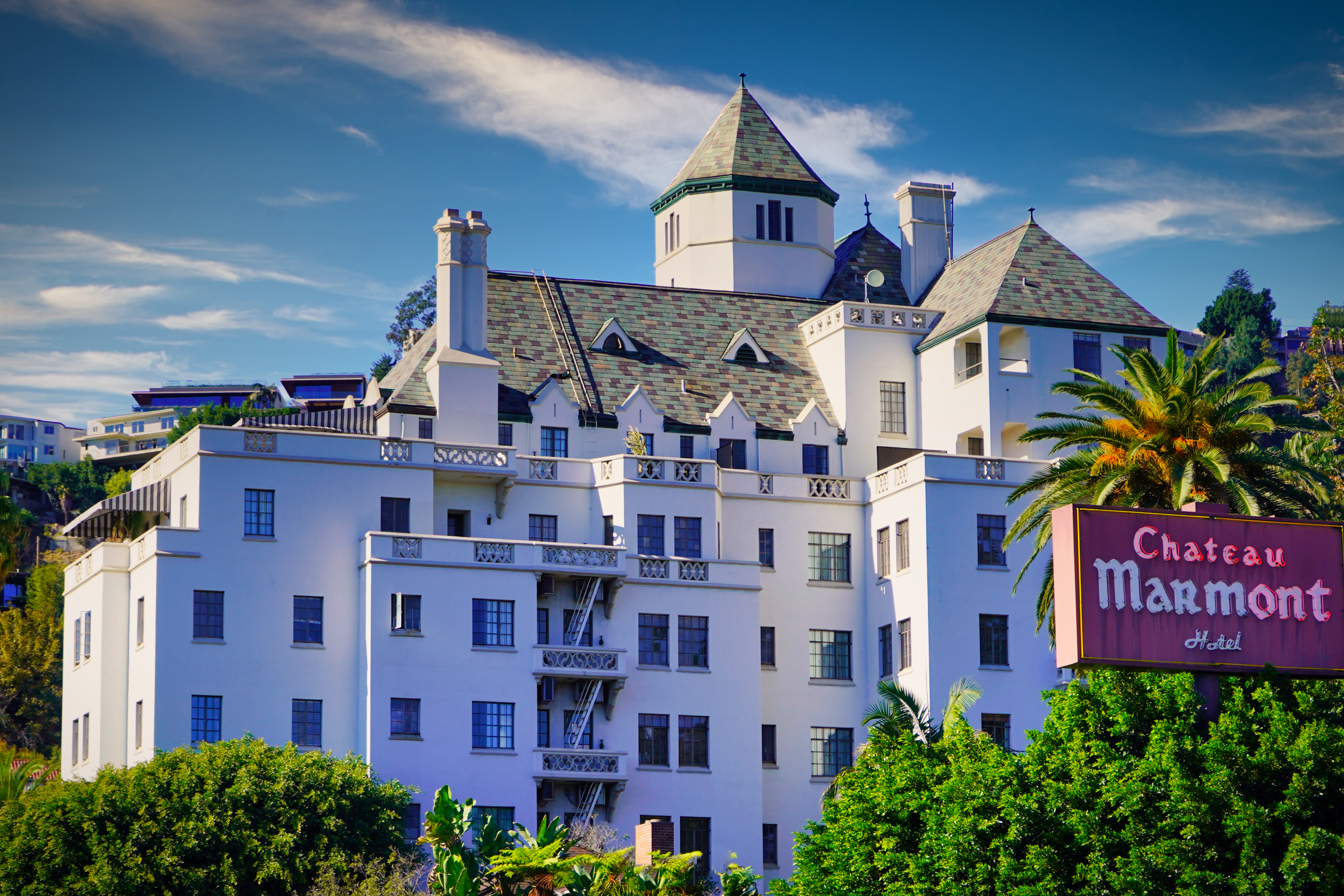

- Location within the Los Angeles metropolitan area

General information
- Architectural style: Châteauesque
- Location: 8221 Sunset Boulevard; Los Angeles, California, U.S.
- Coordinates: 34°5′53″N 118°22′07″W
- Completed: 1929
- Owner: André Balazs

Design and construction
- Architects: Arnold A. Weitzman; William Douglas Lee
- Awards: Michelin key

Other information
- Number of rooms: 63 (rooms, suites, cottages, and bungalows)
- Number of restaurants: 1
- Number of bars: 1

Website
- chateaumarmont.com

Los Angeles Historic-Cultural Monument
- Designated: 1976
- Reference no.: 151

The Chateau Marmont is a historic hotel located at 8221 Sunset Boulevard in West Hollywood, California. Completed in 1929, the hotel was designed by architects Arnold A. Weitzman and William Douglas Lee. (Note: An unbuilt annex to the Chateau was designed by architect W. Gayle Daniel.) It was modeled loosely after the Château d'Amboise, a former royal castle in France's Loire Valley.

The hotel is known as both a long- and short-term residence for celebrities – historically "populated by people either on their way up or on their way down" – as well as a home for New Yorkers in Hollywood. The hotel complex has 63 rooms, suites, cottages, and 4 bungalows.

== History ==
=== Design and construction ===
In 1926, Fred Horowitz, a prominent Los Angeles attorney, chose the site at Marmont Lane and Sunset Boulevard to construct an apartment building. Horowitz had recently traveled to Europe for inspiration and returned to California with photos of an ancient château (the Château d'Amboise, where Leonardo da Vinci is buried) located along the Loire River. In 1927, Horowitz commissioned his brother-in-law, European-trained architect Arnold A. Weitzman, to design the seven-story, L-shaped building based on his photos from France. When deciding upon a name for the building, Chateau Sunset and Chateau Hollywood were rejected in favor of Chateau Marmont, after the small street running in front of the property.

On February 1, 1929, Chateau Marmont opened its doors to the public as the newest residence of Hollywood. Local newspapers described the Chateau as "Los Angeles's newest, finest and most exclusive apartment house [...] superbly situated, close enough to active businesses to be accessible and far enough away to ensure quiet and privacy." For the inaugural reception, over 300 people passed through the site, including local press.

=== Conversion to hotel ===
Due to the high rents and inability to keep tenants for long-term commitments during the Great Depression, Horowitz sold the apartment building in 1931 to Albert E. Smith, co-founder of Vitagraph Studios, for $750,000 in cash (equivalent to $15,880,000 in 2025). Smith converted the building into a hotel, an investment which benefitted from the 1932 Summer Olympics in Los Angeles. The apartments became suites with kitchens and living rooms. The property was also refurbished with antiques from Depression-era estate sales. During the 1930s, the hotel was managed by former silent film actress Ann Little.

During World War II, the hotel served as an air-raid shelter for residents in the surrounding area. From about 1942 to 1963, the Chateau was owned by Erwin Brettauer, a German banker who had funded films in Weimar Germany, and was noted for allowing Black guests, breaking the long-standing color line in Hollywood and Beverly Hills hotels.

Designed and constructed to be earthquake-proof, Chateau Marmont survived major earthquakes in 1933, 1952, 1971, 1987, and 1994 without sustaining any major structural damage. Nine Spanish cottages, as well as a swimming pool, were built next to the hotel in the 1930s and were acquired by the hotel in the 1940s. Craig Ellwood designed two of the four bungalows in 1956, after he completed Case Study Houses.

=== Acquisition by Sarlot-Kantarjian ===
Business was good for the hotel, although by the 1960s, the building was in disrepair, and the owners attempted to sell it multiple times. News articles about the hotel from the 1960s and 1970s described it as an "elderly castle", a "dowdy hotel", "rundown", and "shabby-genteel".

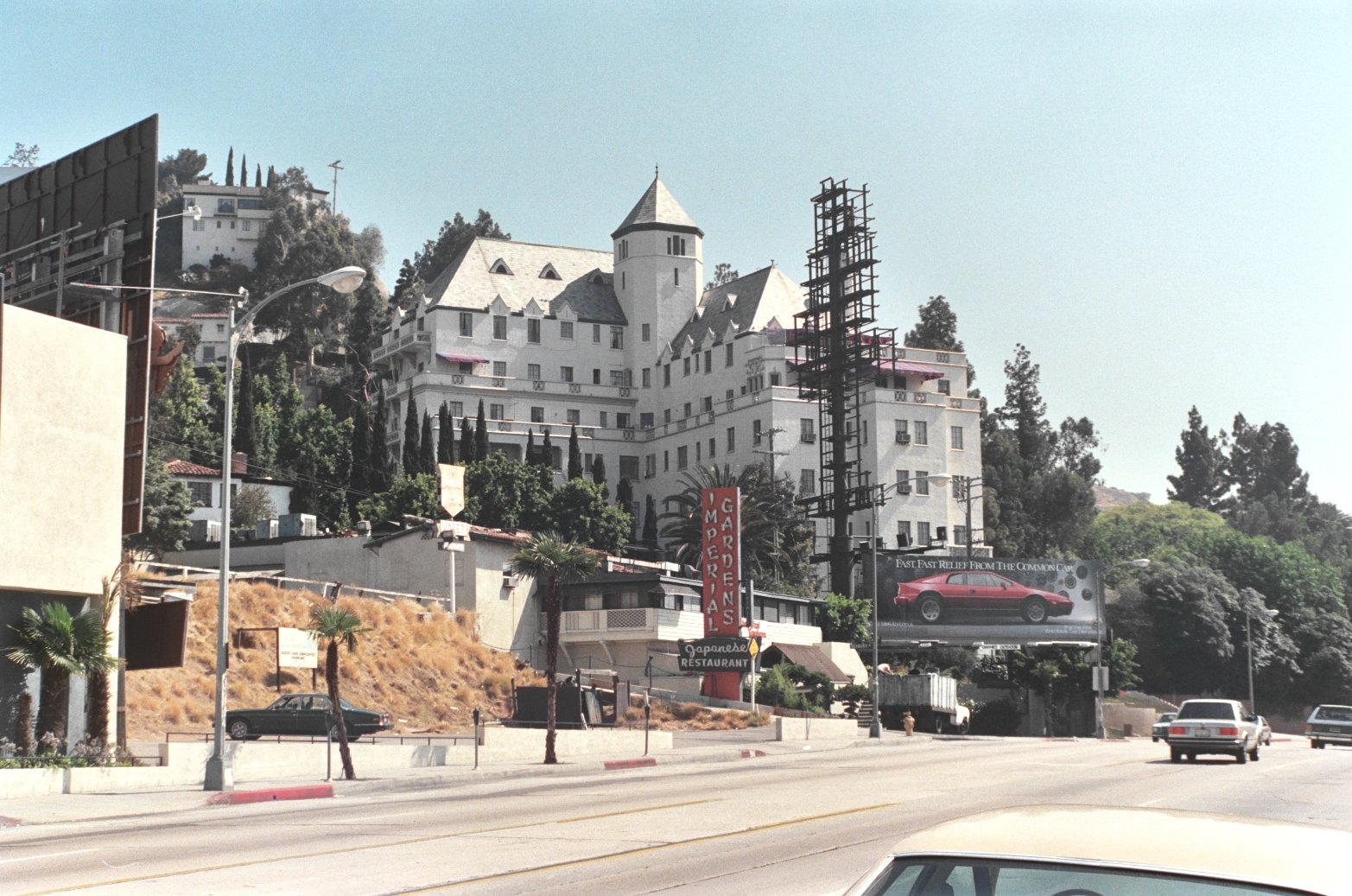
Chateau Marmont in June 1988

After sitting on the market for two years, the hotel was sold in 1975 to Raymond R. Sarlot and Karl Kantarjian of Sarlot-Kantarjian, a real estate development firm, for $1.1 million. Sarlot-Kantarjian planned to expand the hotel with a new wing. They repaired and upgraded many elements of the hotel, but tried to stay true to the hotel's character and history. In 1976, after their acquisition and improvements began, the Chateau was named a Los Angeles Historic-Cultural Monument. In The New York Times, writer Quentin Crisp praised the Chateau's "avoiding undue modernization and stayed deliberately in the romantic past."

=== Restoration and operation under Balazs ===
The hotel was acquired in 1990 by André Balazs. Balazs needed to modernize the hotel while also preserving Chateau Marmont's character. For the restoration, Balazs strove to create the illusion that the hotel had been untouched, notwithstanding renovations. The entire facility was re-carpeted, repainted, and the public spaces were upgraded.

To preserve the privacy of the hotel and bungalows, higher fences plus coverings were used to discourage the public from looking into the grounds.

On July 28, 2020, Chateau Marmont announced plans to convert to a members-only hotel, although at least one restaurant would remain open to the public. These plans were withdrawn in 2022.

On September 16, 2020, The Hollywood Reporter published a report involving accounts from more than thirty former hotel employees that accused the hotel's management and Balazs of fomenting racial discrimination and sexual harassment practices at the hotel; they also accused Balazs of neglecting to provide them with adequate health insurance during the COVID-19 pandemic and suspected the hotel's members-only conversion as an attempt to prevent unionization among the hotel's employees. Despite the denial of the allegations by the hotel management and Balazs, multiple employment discrimination lawsuits were filed against the hotel, with the hotel facing picketing from labor union UNITE HERE and boycotts from numerous celebrities; in support of the boycott, a night shoot at the hotel for Aaron Sorkin's Being the Ricardos was canceled just hours before the intended start of production.

== Dining ==
The hotel restaurant terrace features market-fresh California cuisine from chef Dean Yasharian. The restaurant Bar Marmont closed in 2017.

In July 2018, Chateau Hanare, a new restaurant, opened in a former residential building on the eastern edge of the property. Balazs had spent five years courting the restaurateur, Reika Alexander of New York City's EN Japanese Brasserie. It later closed without announcement.

== In popular culture ==
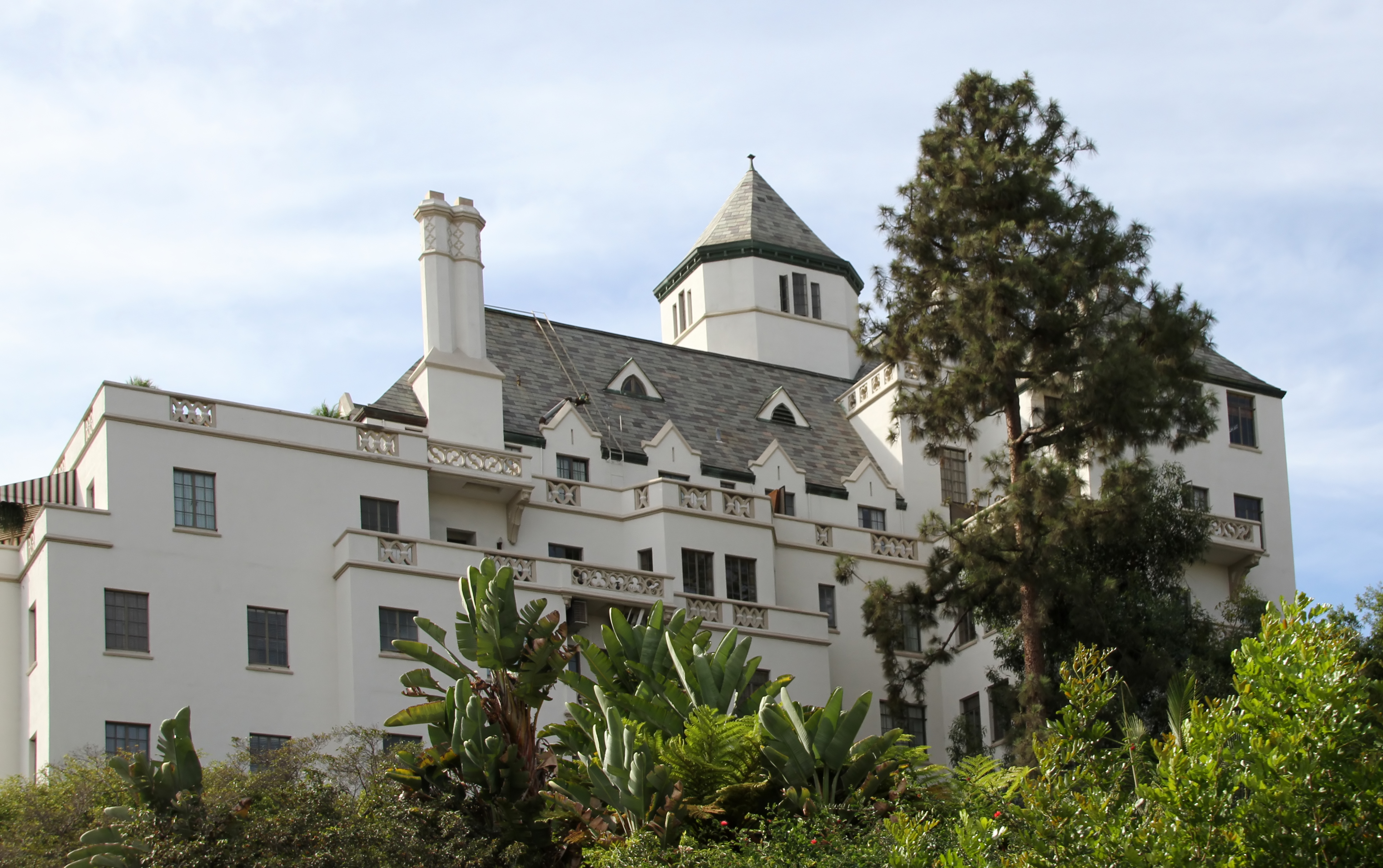
View of the hotel from below

Throughout the years, Chateau Marmont has gained recognition. Anthony Bourdain, Johnny Depp, Tim Burton, Death Grips, F. Scott Fitzgerald, Anthony Kiedis, Annie Leibovitz, Courtney Love, Lana Del Rey, Jay McInerney, Helmut Newton, Dorothy Parker, Nicholas Ray, Terry Richardson, Hunter S. Thompson, and Bruce Weber, among others, have produced work at the hotel. Duran Duran guitarist Andy Taylor married the band's hairdresser Tracey Wilson at the hotel in 1982. Since 2018, Beyoncé and Jay-Z have hosted an annual post-Oscars after-party known as the Gold Party at the hotel.

=== On film ===
Director Sofia Coppola shot her film Somewhere at the hotel in 2010. The hotel also appears in the Academy Award-winning films La La Land (2016) and A Star Is Born (2018), as well as The Strip (1951), The Night Walker (1964), Myra Breckinridge (1970), Blume in Love (1973), The Doors (1991), Dangerous Game (1993), Laurel Canyon (2003), and Maps to the Stars (2014). The opening scene from The Canyons (2013) was shot at the now-closed Bar Marmont.

=== In literature ===
The Chateau has been used as a setting in many books, including Martin Amis's Money (1984) (as the Vraimont), Eve Babitz's Eve's Hollywood (1974) and Slow Days, Fast Company (1977), James Ellroy's The Big Nowhere (1988), Dominick Dunne's An Inconvenient Woman (1990) and Another City, Not My Own (1997), Charles Bukowski's Hollywood (1989), Lee Child's Bad Luck and Trouble (2007), Lauren Weisberger's Last Night at Chateau Marmont (2010), and Michael Connelly's The Drop (2011). It is also the office of fictional paparazzo Patrick Immleman in the Panel Syndicate web comic The Private Eye.

=== In music ===
The hotel has been referred to in many songs, including the title track "Plastic Hearts" by Miley Cyrus from her 2020 album, "chateau" by blackbear from his 2017 album digital druglord, Panic! At The Disco's "Dying in LA", the Grateful Dead's "West L.A. Fadeaway" from the album In the Dark, Lana Del Rey's 2011 single "Off to the Races" from Born to Die, Father John Misty's "Chateau Lobby #4 (in C for Two Virgins)" from I Love You, Honeybear (2015), Angus & Julia Stone's 2017 single "Chateau" from Snow, Lily Allen's 2017 single "Trigger Bang" from No Shame, Joshua Radin's 2020 single "Chateau", and Nine Vicious’ “Chateau Marmont” from his mixtape Sedition. In 2017, Jarvis Cocker and Chilly Gonzales collaborated on a concept album of music inspired by the hotel, named Room 29, after one of the rooms with a piano. The cover photos for various albums have been taken at the hotel, including Gram Parsons's GP and Death Grips's infamous No Love Deep Web, and many musicians have performed live at the hotel, including Miley Cyrus and Anne Pigalle.

=== In art and fashion ===
Actor James Franco created a replica of the Chateau's Bungalow 2 for his Rebel Without a Cause exhibit at MOCA in 2012. The hotel's stationery has featured in work by artists André, Gary Baseman, Robert Gober, Martin Kippenberger, and Claes Oldenburg, among others. The Chateau's branding was featured in a capsule collection from fashion label Gucci in 2018.

=== In video games ===
Locations in the video games Grand Theft Auto: San Andreas (2004), Midnight Club: Los Angeles (2008), and Grand Theft Auto V (2013) are based on Chateau Marmont.

=== Deaths ===
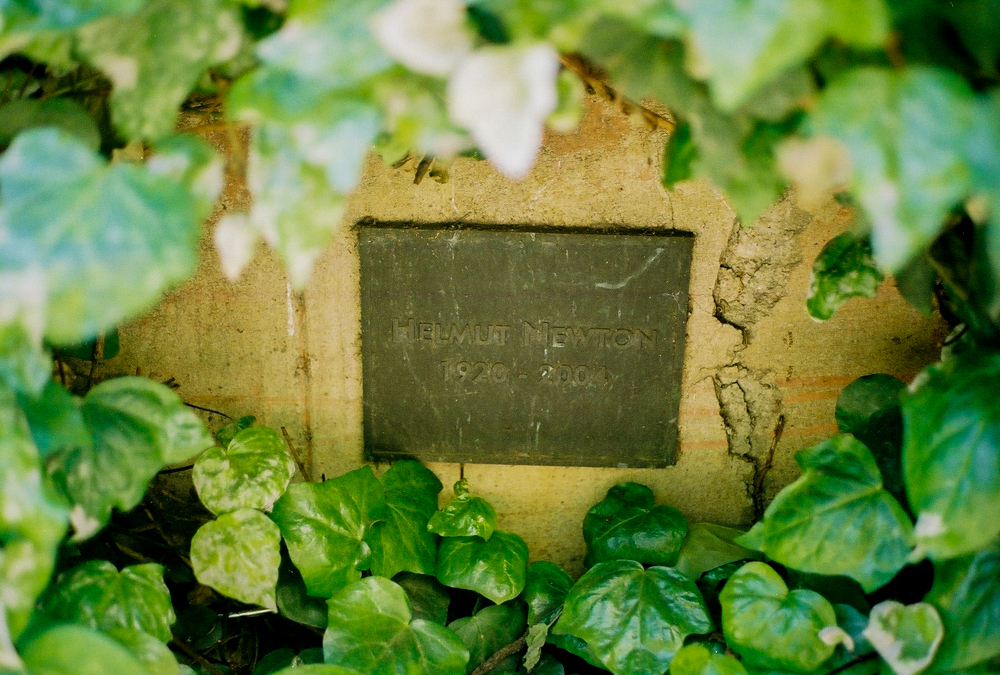
Memorial plaque at site of Helmut Newton's accident, marking the spot where his car hit the wall

John Belushi died of a drug overdose in Bungalow 3 on March 5, 1982. Photographer Helmut Newton died on January 23, 2004, after suffering a heart attack and crashing his car when pulling out of the driveway.

== See also ==
- Los Angeles Historic-Cultural Monuments in Hollywood
