= True Grandeur =

2017 American novel

- First edition
- Author: Cal R. Barnes
- Language: English
- Genre: Coming-of-age, literary
- Published: September 20, 2017 (US)
- Publisher: Magic Hour Press (US)
- Publication place: United States
- Media type: Hardcover, trade paperback, ebook & audio
- Pages: 280 (US First Edition)

True Grandeur is a 2017 novel written by American author Cal R. Barnes. The story tells the tale of Conrad Arlington, a young Hollywood hopeful that moves to modern day Los Angeles to fulfill his dream of becoming a great artist. From humble beginnings, Conrad begins making his way into the Hollywood circles and within a few year's time catches the eye of Gracie Garrison, a beautiful, mysterious socialite who is just as alluring as the rumors that surround her.

Barnes’ first novel explores themes such as coming of age, individuality, social class, true love, and the innate the need for individual importance. Conrad's move to Los Angeles in order to make something of himself could be considered a look into certain aspects of the American Dream.

== Plot ==
At the turn of the 21st century, Conrad Arlington drives to Los Angeles, California for the first time to pursue his dream of becoming a great artist. Upon his arrival, Conrad struggles for a while as he adjusts to the city and hones his craft, then, after a few years, he meets a group of artists and writes a play that brings him his first taste of real success. Utilizing his glimpse of fame, he decides to produce his first film, which brings him to the attention of Gracie Garrison, a beautiful socialite who decides to audition for the project. Being young and in over his head financially, Conrad is forced to abandoned the project and begin anew, but his ambition is not easily forgotten by those around him.

Some time later at a bar in Hollywood, Conrad runs into Gracie and her business partner, Maxwell Price. Gracie is impressed by Conrad's script, and suggests that they should all go into business together to begin a project of their own. Enamored by Gracie's beauty and still relatively new to the Hollywood circle, Conrad agrees without much thought.

A few weeks later Conrad receives a phone call from Maxwell inviting him to Gracie's residence in Studio City to discuss the project. Conrad arrives per their request, where he is greeted by a model named Evie Clark, who is one of Gracie's best friends. Maxwell offers Conrad a drink and Gracie puts on music as they both avoid Conrad's attempts to address any real business. Conrad soon realizes that it wasn't a meeting they called him to, but a party, as guests begin to arrive. He is quickly surrounded by Hollywood elite as Gracie and Maxwell disappear. On the balcony, he meets a young actor by the name of Benjamin Trask who warns him about getting too close to Gracie, that she is mysterious and can't be trusted. Conrad, being fond of Gracie, doesn't care for Benjamin or the interaction, so he floats back through the party before going home.

Conrad returns home, considering the whole night a dream. Two weeks later he gets a call from Gracie, who requests that he pick her up that night to accommodate her to a gallery opening. Conrad agrees and picks her up, sparking an adventurous night together. They meet Bobby Finch, a flamboyant art dealer and another one of Gracie's friends, and Alice Button, an alcoholic, fallen film director that lives in the shadow of a giant cherry prop. When Conrad pushes too hard and causes Alice to break down into tears, they leave, and Gracie takes Conrad to an exclusive nightclub on the Sunset Strip. Once inside, Conrad describes the people as ‘the Ghosts of Sunset Boulevard.’

When they leave the nightclub, two privileged brothers by the name of Harry and Alex Vanderbuilt drive up in a limousine with their beautiful cousin Gwendolyn from New York, going to a party. Conrad and Gracie have their first argument, and Gracie gets in with them. Conrad goes back into the club where he nearly has to resort to force to get the address from a drunk director, before following them to the party. There, Harry finds Conrad and tells him that Gracie hasn't been the same since she left, and that she has hardly spoken to anyone. Conrad says that it serves her right, and at the same time notices Gwendolyn staring at him through the crowd as she dances seductively. Conrad tells Harry to have Gracie come find him as he approaches Gwendolyn. As they begin to dance, Conrad has a crisis of conscious just as Gracie approaches. They leave the party together.

Exhausted from the long night, they go back to Gracie's house and fall asleep. When Conrad awakes, Gracie is gone. Conrad goes home in an ecstatic mood from the great night, believing that they are moving toward a healthy relationship and that he will hear from her shortly, but he doesn't. Months go by and Gracie doesn't call, and Conrad becomes depressed.

Eventually, Conrad has enough and makes it his mission to find her. He doubles back on every place they visited on that night they had together, where the rumors around Gracie's personage become more and more mysterious. When he's almost given up all hope, he comes across the card of Benjamin Trask, the actor he met at Gracie's party all those nights ago. He calls him and they agree to meet. Conrad visits the Château Marmont where Benjamin is staying. In the lobby, Benjamin drinks heavily and spills more secrets about Gracie, including the fact that they used to be together for a short time back in the day, and that she played him. He also warns Conrad to be wary of Gracie's business partner, Maxwell Price, and that he cannot be trusted.

When the meeting is over, and Conrad is still no closer to finding Gracie, he slips further into depression and melancholy. He goes on a drinking spree down into Hollywood, where he is struck with disturbing and horrific visions. He passes out on the Boulevard, then wakes up in his bed the next morning without knowing how he got there. He can no longer to write or work, and resolves to commit suicide by throwing himself off an overpass onto the freeway.

On his way to go through with it, Conrad runs into Evie Clark — the model he met at Gracie's — sitting outside a café. Without Gracie around, Evie is actually very pleasant, and the two of them talk and begin a relationship. They begin seeing each frequently, but neither of them mentions Gracie. Eventually Conrad can't help himself and asks about her, and the two have a vicious fight. Evie spills more dark secrets about Gracie, and Conrad says things that he can't take back, ultimately ending their relationship.

Conrad spends the next two weeks holed up in his apartment, drinking heavily. Eventually he takes a walk down into Hollywood in a dream state, where he reflects upon his life. More time passes, the summer rolls around, and Conrad begins to write again as he finally begins to move on. Then, one day out of the blue, he gets a call from Maxwell Price. He says that they are in the area and that they are coming to pick Conrad up for a day by the pool. Against his better judgment, Conrad can't resist the chance to see Gracie and to find out what happened to her. Within a matter of minutes they are in Maxwell's car on the way to the pool. Gracie avoids him on the way there.

The pool is located at a hotel off the Sunset Strip. They go up to the suite of William Montgomery, a wealthy film producer and businessman that takes liberties with Gracie that Conrad doesn't like. Gracie makes drinks, then Evie Clark appears from a bedroom. Conrad and Evie pretend that they don't know the other, then she leaves and Conrad doesn't see her again. It's unclear whether Gracie was aware of Evie and his previous relationship, or if she cared.

They have lunch, then they all go down to the pool to sunbathe for the remainder of the day. As Gracie swims and plays in the water, William tells Conrad that he sees a lot of himself in him, and offers him a potential career opportunity. He also tells Conrad more about Gracie and his relationship, and that they have come to an understanding where they meet each other's needs. This causes him to lash out at William in anger, ending the day for them all.

On the way home, Conrad, Gracie, and Maxwell don't say a word. Rather than dropping Conrad off at home, Maxwell drives them all up to Gracie's residence in the hills of Studio City. There, Gracie retreats to her bedroom, and Conrad and Maxwell almost come to blows. Maxwell tells Conrad that he is sick and has done unforgivable things. For a moment, Conrad has sympathy for the man, but leaves him crying in the living room to go find Gracie. He finds her crying on her bed. He sits down next to her, and they sympathize over how much they tortured each other for the last year. Conrad tells Gracie that he loves her, and she tells him she knows and that his love for her caused her to run away because it was too much. She thought she was doing the right thing by leaving him. Conrad then kisses her, but doesn't have the passionate reaction that he was anticipating. It becomes clear that the pain they caused each other was too great for either of them to enjoy it anymore. Gracie is tired, so Conrad lies her down and tucks her into bed. He stops in the doorway and looks back on her, and says that for the first time in a long time he finally has his answer. He finally turns off the light and closes the door.

== Characters ==
Conrad Arlington — A twenty-three-year-old, upper-middle class young man that moves out on his own to Los Angeles to pursue his dream of becoming a great artist. Conrad serves as the first-person narrator of the novel. He is intelligent, ambitious, willful, honest, independently driven, and often temperamental. His pride, or the ‘Great Arlington Pride’, as he calls it, serves as a source of both great strength and great weakness for him. In moments of triumph or doubt, he refers to himself as ‘The Last True Artist’, an alter ego he uses to ground his reality and keep him on course in challenging circumstances. When he meets Gracie Garrison, he falls instantly in love with her. How Conrad balances his creative ambitions with his affection and desire to be closer to Gracie is one of the main forces that drives the story.

Gracie Garrison — An attractive, mysterious socialite and actress who lives in the hills of Studio City and throws lavish parties for the Hollywood elite. Aside from her beauty, her accomplishments are relatively unknown, and she is portrayed more as famous for being famous rather than having actual achievements. She is both Conrad's love interest, and the source for most of his grief, giving her an antagonistic quality despite her captivating allure and seeming affection for him. Her choice to leave town and disappear rather than tell Conrad the truth of who she really is, is one of the main conflicts that drives the story.

Maxwell Price — Gracie's older, mischievous business partner. His relationship to Gracie is never clear, other than that she trusts him and that their relationship is platonic. He is greatly distrusted by Benjamin Trask, who warns Conrad to tread lightly with him after a bad experience. At the end of the story Maxwell tells Conrad through tears that he has a great sickness, and that Conrad has none of his sickness in him. It is not made clear what he is exactly referring to, other than that the man is disappointed in himself and his dealings, especially with Gracie. Maxwell's relationship with Gracie, and what they provide for each other, is one of the mysteries of the story.

Evie Clark — A beautiful, doe-eyed model and one of Gracie's longtime friends. She is cold towards Conrad in the beginning, but it is later revealed that she acted out of insecurity and fear of Gracie when Conrad and her begin a relationship. In truth, Evie is kind, honest, and one of the best things to happen to Conrad in the story. It is Conrad's obsession with Gracie and his inability to let her go that ultimately drives Evie away and destroys their relationship.

Benjamin Trask — A young, successful, good-looking actor that appears at Gracie's party in the Hills, then later when he meets with Conrad at the Château Marmont to give Conrad advice when Gracie disappears. Although they never became intimate, he was one of Gracie's past romances after they met at Fashion Week in New York City. The relationship doesn't last long, and he blames the failure on the dealings and behavior of Maxwell Price, who he despises.

Bobby Finch — A flamboyant art dealer and another longtime friend of Gracie's. He is independently wealthy, with studios in Los Angeles, New York, and Paris. He hosts a gallery opening that kicks off Gracie and Conrad's magical night together. After Gracie disappears, Conrad finally tracks him down and gets him on the phone to try and get information. Bobby warns Conrad to protect his heart, but won't say anymore than that about it.

Alice Button — An aging, alcoholic, fallen director that lives in her cottage on the Westside of Los Angeles, along with Chester the Cherry, a giant eight-foot prop from one of her more famous films. She met Gracie on the French Rivera at Cannes during her heyday, and they've remained friends ever since. Gracie takes Conrad to her house after the gallery opening on their magical night out on the town together. Already drunk when they arrive, Alice's loose mouth and words push Conrad to the edge. Conrad lashes out at her, causing her to break into a bout of hysteria where she destroys her precious Chester the Cherry. In the wake of the absurd scene, Gracie and Conrad are forced to leave.

Harry and Alex Vanderbuilt — Two wealthy, privileged brothers that pick Gracie up in their limousine after Conrad and Gracie exit the nightclub on Sunset Boulevard and take her to a late-night party. Their presence poses an immediate threat to Conrad's building intimacy with Gracie, although it is short lived.

Gwendolyn Vanderbuilt — Harry and Alex's beautiful and seductive cousin from New York. She moved to Los Angeles to pursue "film business", and it is suggested that she may work in the sex work industry. She notices the affection Conrad has for Gracie, and targets him at an after-party. With much struggle, Conrad finds his resolve and chooses his desire to get closer to Gracie over his raw, carnal attraction to Gwendolyn, marking one of the major turning points of the story.

William Montgomery — an independently wealthy, arrogant film producer who makes his appearance at the end of the story when Conrad, Gracie, and Maxwell visit his residence at a hotel off the Sunset Strip for lunch and a day by the pool. His exact relationship to Gracie is never stated, other than that they have a mutual understanding and meet each other's individual needs. The weight of William's words shatter Conrad's reality in regards to how he prefers to view Gracie, enraging him and causing him to lash out, thus ending the day for them all. William's character serves as the catalyst for the final chapter, further revealing the truth of who Gracie and Maxwell really are.

== Themes ==
The story revolves around coming-of-age themes like growing up, chasing dreams, and manifest destiny. Conrad's innate need for individual importance is ingrained throughout his journey, and the subtle class divisions that exist between social and artistic people in Los Angeles are also explored. The complexities and difficulties of attempting to attain true love whilst sustaining a successful career as an artist in a competitive area is one of the main themes that influences the whole novel.

== Title ==
The phrase "True Grandeur" is used a number of times throughout the novel. In the first instance in chapter 1 it is used to describe the divide between the wealthy and poor classes of Los Angeles —

"Only in Los Angeles could the rich and the poor truly co-exist side by side, separated by a single boulevard or avenue, for there was very little middle ground here, and that which existed formed a line, a line that stood very tall, and very strong, and very formidable — a line between poverty and true grandeur."

The phrase "True Grandeur" or "grandeur" is often used to describe Gracie's beauty and the contents of her lifestyle.

== Cover art ==
The cover art, which features the upper body and head of a young woman floating in a sea of light looking back on the distant figure of a golden man trailing behind her, was painted by the award-winning, New York based water color artist Laurie Goldstein-Warren.

== References to other Los Angeles novelists and artists ==
Conrad, the protagonist and first-person narrator of the story, makes references to authors and artists that inspired him throughout the book, mostly authors of Los Angeles Novels and Hollywood Novels at the beginning of chapter three. These include F. Scott Fitzgerald for This Side of Paradise, The Great Gatsby, and The Last Tycoon; writer Harold Robbins for his Los Angeles novels The Dream Merchants and The Carpetbaggers; Los Angeles fiction authors John Fante, Budd Schulberg, Gavin Lambert, Alison Lurie, Nathaniel West, and MacDonald Harris; and Pulitzer Prize winning author Norman Mailer.
