= Rise (play) =

American play by Cal Barnes

Rise is a play by American playwright, screenwriter, author, actor, and filmmaker Cal Barnes, which premiered at the 2012 Hollywood Fringe Festival and was nominated for four awards, including 'Best World Premiere,' which it won.

== Plot ==
The play takes place in Pastor Henry Donner's office at emerging church in present-day Los Angeles. Between sermons, Henry is visited by Alexandra Riverton, a mysterious, beautiful woman who is full of questions about the church and Henry's life. In a twist involving an old song the two wrote and shared together, it is revealed that Alexandra is Henry's ex-lover from New York City, back before he made the journey West to California to begin anew. This sparks a cat and mouse game in pursuit of what really happened to them all those years ago, and for the truth of what drove them apart on that fateful day of disembarkment.

== Production history ==
Rise was originally produced by the Zenith Ensemble Theatre at the 2012 Hollywood Fringe Festival where it premiered on the Asylum Stages in June 2012. After being nominated for four awards, including 'Best World Premiere' which it won, Rise was picked up for a full run at the Elephant Theatre Company in the fall of 2012. It was directed by Aaron Lyons and starred Brett Colbeth as Henry Donner and Gowrie Hayden as Alexandra Riverton. The lighting design was by Matthew Richter; the sound design was by Aaron Lyons; the set design was collaborative between the ensemble.

== Awards ==
Rise won Best World Premiere at the 2012 Hollywood Fringe Festival. It was also nominated for three other awards, including Best in Theatre, Top of the Fringe, and the Theatre Unleashed Award which recognizes "truly remarkable theatre with a fresh, thought-provoking approach to original or established works."

== Reception ==
Rise opened to critical acclaim in Los Angeles, with almost exclusively unanimous positive reviews from media outlets.

Travis Michael Holder of Backstage Magazine wrote "Barnes' play is lifted from its inevitabilities by two factors: riveting performances and the 24-year-old Barnes' haunted, evocative dialogue."

Bob Leggett of the Los Angeles Examiner (Before the Examiner was absorbed by AXS) wrote "It is most remarkable and noteworthy that this is the first play drafted by writer Cal Barnes. I do believe that he may just be the next Arthur Miller." However, the play did receive a single criticism for poor use of space, with the actors excessively physically separated.

Paul Birchall of the LA Weekly wrote "Barnes's writing possesses a thoughtful maturity that meshes good, evocative dialogue with a nuanced sense of philosophical ambiguity. Director Aaron Lyons's production is feverishly intense, with the stage almost not being big enough to contain Hayden and Colbeth's crackling chemistry. The evolution of Colbeth's character - by the end, he resembles nothing of the figure he was in the play's opening scenes - is particularly masterful."

Steven Stanley of Stage Scene LA praised the dynamism of the two actors, the assured stagecraft of the Director and talent of the writer. While noting that the timing of the primary reveal was surprisingly late, the pairing of music with the performance was complimented.

Willard Manus of Total Theatre wrote "Barnes keeps going deeper into character, revealing not just the passion and love they felt for each other, but the flaws, weaknesses and contradictions that eventually drove them apart."

M.R. Hunter of Eye Spy LA wrote "Mean, lean, and full of hard punches, 'Rise' is a surefire attention grabber that doesn't let go. If you liked 'Mercy Seat' then sit down for this intense trip."

== Film version ==
Cal Barnes' original play was optioned for screen development at the end of the play's original run in 2012. After writing the screenplay, the option was never exercised, and the rights have since reverted to Barnes.

Barnes currently has the screenplay set up with his production company. The play's original cast member, Brett Colbeth, is set to star as Henry Donner, with actress Frances Brennand Roper slated to star opposite him as Alexandra Riverton.
