= Crown City News =

- Also known as: CCN - Crown City News
- Genre: News
- Created by: Tami DeVine; Chavel DeVine
- Directed by: Todd Fluker; Grant Derderian
- Presented by: Sehnita Joshua Mattison; Curtis Peek (Weather)
- Country of origin: United States
- Original language: English
- No. of seasons: 9
- No. of episodes: 432

Production
- Producers: Lily Nuno; Robert Moran; Kelly Forsch
- Production locations: Pasadena Community Network; Pasadena, California
- Running time: 30 minutes

Original release
- Network: Pasadena Community Network
- Release: November 22, 2004 – present

Crown City News ("CCN") is a local television and online news organization which serves Pasadena, California and the San Gabriel Valley. Crown City News airs as a weekly, 30-minute television newscast on the Pasadena Community Network Monday nights at 6:00PM and also provides online news throughout the week for locals. Weekly editions of Crown City News include segments with local news stories, an "on camera" interview segment, San Gabriel Valley weather and sports, and technology news.

== Game Changers ==
Crown City News Game Changers is a weekly, in-depth interview program anchored by Tami DeVine and produced by Crown City News. CCN Game Changers interviews a different and notable person making a difference in the community ("changing the game") each week. Featured guests include Jesse Ventura and Isiah Washington.

== Notable coverage ==
Crown City News has provided extensive television coverage of several events of importance to the local community over the last several years. CCN produces and airs live coverage of the Pasadena Marathon each year, featuring live coverage from reporters along the route. In the midst of the Station Fire (2009) on August 29, 2009, CCN provided live local coverage of the fire, interviewing city and fire officials from the City of Pasadena and Los Angeles County Sheriff's Department. CCN also provided extensive reports and stories online during December 2011 wind storms which caused nearly $50 million in damages to Pasadena.
