= Mart Crowley =

American playwright (1935–2020)

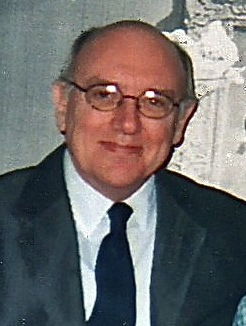
- Crowley on the set of The Men from the Boys
- Born: Edward Martino Crowley; August 21, 1935; Vicksburg, Mississippi, U.S.
- Died: March 7, 2020 (aged 84); New York City, U.S.
- Occupations: Playwright, writer
- Writing career
- Genres: Drama, comedy
- Notable work: The Boys in the Band

Edward Martino Crowley (August 21, 1935 – March 7, 2020) was an American playwright best known for his 1968 play The Boys in the Band.

== Early life ==
Crowley was born in Vicksburg, Mississippi. He graduated in 1957 from The Catholic University of America in Washington, D.C., studying acting and show business.

== Theatre and film ==
After graduation, Crowley headed west to Hollywood, where he worked for a number of television production companies before meeting Natalie Wood on the set of her film Splendor in the Grass. Wood hired him as her assistant, primarily to give him ample free time to work on his gay-themed play The Boys in the Band, which opened off-Broadway on April 14, 1968, and enjoyed a run of 1,000 performances. Crowley became part of Wood's inner circle of friends that she called "the nucleus", whose main requirement was that they pass a "kindness" test.

Off the success of the play, Crowley had a writing residency at Paramount Pictures, and wrote the screenplay for the movie Fade-In, which was directed by Jud Taylor and starred Barbara Loden and Burt Reynolds. However, he was displeased with rewrites on the screenplay by other writers, and used $1700 from his profits on his play to pay Paramount to take his name off the film. Director Taylor also ultimately asked his name be removed as well; the film's direction was credited to Alan Smithee.

The Boys in the Band was adapted into a film in 1970 directed by William Friedkin.

Crowley's 2002 sequel to The Boys in the Band was entitled The Men from the Boys.

In 2018 Boys in the Band was restaged on Broadway in a 50th anniversary revival featuring Matt Bomer, Jim Parsons, Zachary Quinto, and Andrew Rannells.

Crowley also wrote and produced Remote Asylum and the autobiographical A Breeze from the Gulf.

== Television work ==
In 1979 and 1980, Crowley served first as the executive script editor and then producer of the ABC series Hart to Hart, starring Wood's husband Robert Wagner and Stefanie Powers. His other credits include the teleplays for There Must Be a Pony (1986), Bluegrass (1988), People Like Us (1990), a reunion special of Hart to Hart in 1996 and stage play For Reasons That Remain Unclear (1993).

== Documentary appearances ==
Crowley appeared in at least four documentaries: The Celluloid Closet (1995), about the depiction of homosexuality in cinema; Dominick Dunne: After the Party (2007), a biography of Crowley's friend and producer Dominick Dunne; Making the Boys (2011), a documentary about the making of the gay play and subsequent Hollywood movie; and The Boys in the Band: Something Personal (2020), a documentary about the 2020 Netflix film of the play.

== Death ==
Crowley died in Manhattan on March 7, 2020. He had a heart attack, after which he underwent open-heart surgery and died while recovering. The 2020 film was dedicated to the memory of Crowley. Crowley was openly gay.

== See also ==
- LGBT culture in New York City
- List of LGBT people from New York City
- NYC Pride March
