= Too Much Money =

Too Much Money may refer to:

- Too Much Money (novel), a 2009 novel by Dominick Dunne
- Too Much Money (film), a 1926 American silent romantic comedy film
