= Cal Barnes =

American actor

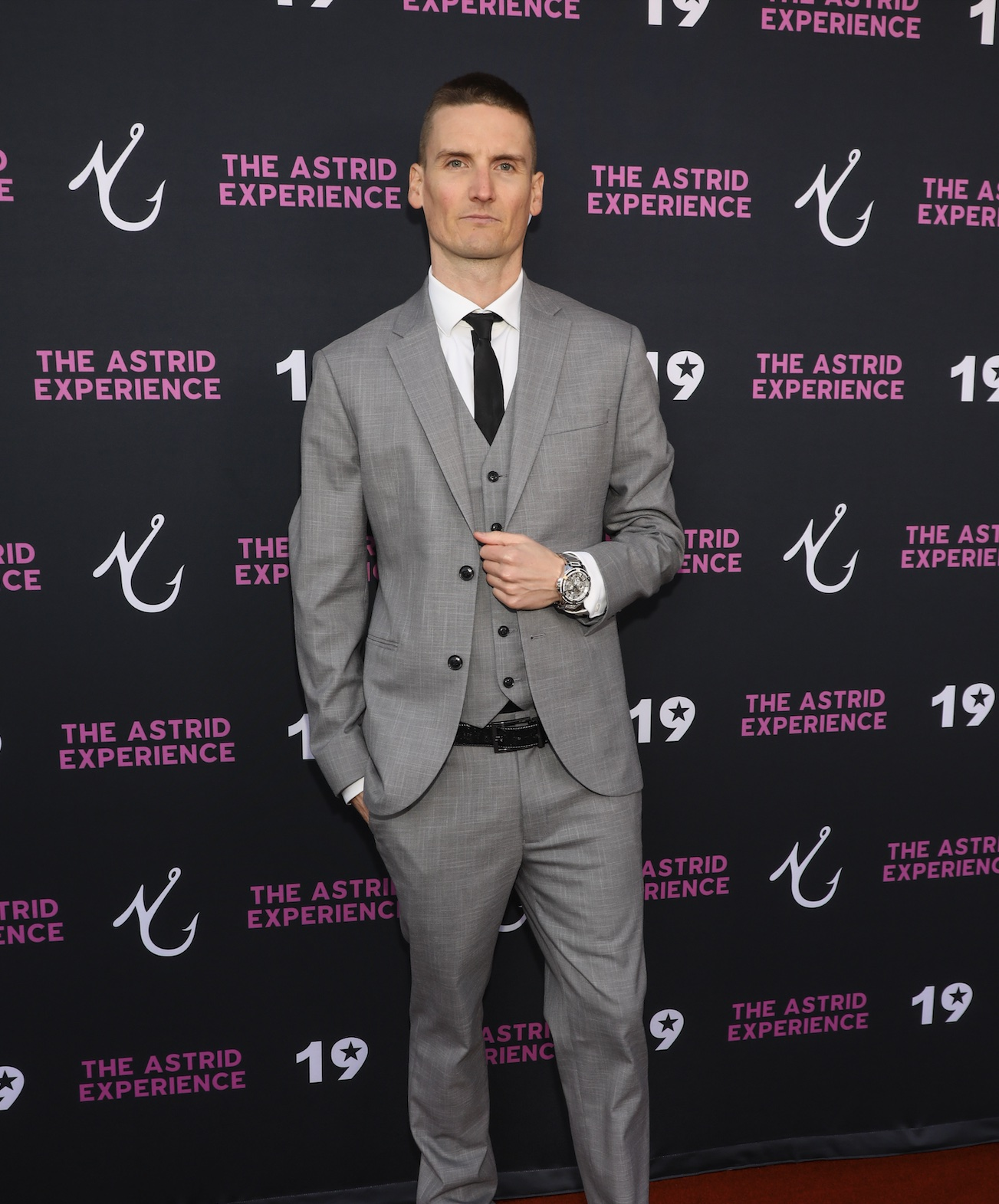
- Cal Barnes attends the red carpet world premiere of "The Astrid Experience" on March 23, 2023 in Los Angeles, California
- Born: Calvin Ross Barnes; January 14, 1988 (age 38); Salem, Oregon, U.S.
- Education: Portland State University
- Occupations: Actor; Director; Screenwriter; Film Producer; Novelist; Playwright
- Years active: 2010–present
- Website: calbarnes.com

Calvin Ross Barnes (born January 14, 1988) is an American actor, director, screenwriter, film producer, novelist, and playwright. Barnes moved to Los Angeles in 2009, where he began his career by starring in short films, appearing in television commercials, and writing screenplays. His stage play, Rise, won Best World Premiere at the 2012 Hollywood Fringe Festival. In 2014, Barnes appeared in the Universal Studios horror film, Unfriended, which was executive produced by Jason Blum. He has three published novels, True Grandeur (2017), and the Peter Pan sequels, Son of Neverland (2021), and Son of Neverland and the Kingdom of Time (2025), both in which he is attached to star in. He is the star of The Astrid Experience, which also marks his feature film directorial debut.

== Early life and education ==
Cal Barnes was born in Salem, Oregon. He studied creative writing, journalism, and theatre at Portland State University before moving to Los Angeles.

== Career ==
Barnes started his acting career in 2010 when he began booking numerous short films he self-submitted for that filmed in and around Los Angeles. He began acting professionally in 2011 when he landed his first agent and began booking theatrical and commercial work. In late 2011, he moved to the Franklin Village neighborhood in the Hollywood Hills, where he began penning feature screenplays.

During his time in the village, Barnes penned his first play, Rise (2012), which went on to win Best World Premiere at the 2012 Hollywood Fringe Festival. He also wrote his first novel, True Grandeur, which chronicles the tale of Conrad Arlington, a young Hollywood hopeful that moves to Los Angeles to pursue his dream of becoming a great artist, all while managing his affections for Gracie Garrison, a young Hollywood it girl who takes an interest in him. In an interview regarding the novel, Barnes stated, "I was inspired by some experiences I had in my early twenties when I first moved to Los Angeles." He also had a role in the successful horror film franchise, Unfriended (2014), which was produced by Timur Bekmambetov and Jason Blum, and released by Universal Studios.

Barnes recently starred in the feature film, The Astrid Experience (2023). It marks Barnes's second collaboration with musician John That, the first being the music video Hippy Girl(2014), which Barnes directed. The Astrid Experience is Barnes's feature film debut as director.

The Astrid Experience had its world premiere at the Laemmle Royal Theatre in Santa Monica, CA on March 23, 2023. On March 25, 2023, Barnes and That released the film on the Official Noblehooks Productions Youtube channel to 2.5 thousand subscribers. The film has subsequently been released by Tubi, Amazon Prime Video, and Apple TV. and in 2025 was ranked #5 on FandomWire Magazine's 'Top 10 Movies Shot on iPhone', behind Sean Baker's Tangerine.

On October 27, 2021, Barnes published his second novel, Son of Neverland, a Peter Pan sequel that takes place one hundred years into the future. The novel hit the #1 new release for mythology and folklore fantasy fiction on Amazon for the month of November, 2021. In honor of J.M. Barrie's legacy and support of children's hospitals, Barnes and the publisher set up a charitable fund to continue the endowment. On the official website and in the recitals of the novel Barnes and publisher state that "10% of the net proceeds from this book will go directly towards supporting children’s hospitals, charities, organizations, institutions, and causes worldwide that are designed to keep children safe, healthy, creative, imaginative, and ultimately make their lives better."

In an Interview with Revamp Magazine in March, 2023, Barnes confirmed that he's attached to play Peter Pan in the franchise. "I am the character," Barnes says. "I'm attached to play Peter, and the novel art has already been created in my likeness, so it's well on its way."

Son of Neverland and the Kingdom of Time, the second book in the series, was released on October 29, 2025.

On July 4, 2026, Barnes launched his new show, Unlimited Creation, on Youtube and Spotify.

In September 2026, Barnes launched a Wefunder campaign to finance his sophomore feature film, 'The Influencer House Massacre', a Gen-Z Horror Film that opened up the investment opportunity to the general public. A first look development scene was released for the project on November 12th, 2026.

== Appearances in other media ==
In 2011, Barnes portrayed the teenage version of Jimmy "The Rev" Sullivan in the music video for the Avenged Sevenfold song "So Far Away", which served as a tribute video to the band's late drummer who passed in 2009. It is the band's first number one single. As of April 2026, the video has over 430 million views on youtube.

In October 2024, Barnes briefly appeared in Tyler, the Creator's "Noid" music video.

== Filmography ==
=== Films ===
Year	Title	Role	Notes
2011	Plunge	Wendell	Also Writer, Producer. First short film with his production company. Soundtrack includes 'If Work Permits' by The Format
2012	Faith and Other Weapons	Josh	Thesis film by Cooper Hefner
2014	Unfriended	Rando Pauls	
2018	Adolescence	NA	Writer, Associate Producer
2023	Krispr	Matthew Shepp	
2023	The Astrid Experience	Chase Abbott	Directorial Debut. Also Writer, Producer.
2026	Astrolatry	Officer Clarke	
2027	The Influencer House Massacre	Josh Carter	Attached. Also Writer/ Director
2029	Infinite Limits	Collin Whitney	Attached. Also Writer
TBD	Son of Neverland	Peter Pan	Attached. Based on the Novel
TBD	Son of Neverland and the Kingdom of Time	Peter Pan	Attached. Based on the Novel

=== Stage ===
Year	Title	Role	Notes
2012	Rise	Playwright	Zenith Ensemble / Hollywood Fringe Festival, Won 'Best World Premiere'
2013	The Absence of Sound	Dane, Playwright	Award-Winning Playwright Competition

=== Music videos ===
Year	Title	Artist	Role
2011	"So Far Away"	Avenged Sevenfold	Teenage Jimmy 'The Rev' Sullivan
2011	"Who's in Control" / Valhalla Dancehall	British Sea Power	Rebel Leader
2014	"Hippy Girl"	John That	Director, Producer
2024	"Noid"	Tyler, the Creator	Robber

=== Books & Publications ===
- True Grandeur: A Hollywood Novel (Magic Hour Press 2017) ISBN 978-0999161029
- Son of Neverland (Magic Hour Press 2021) ISBN 978-0999161074
- Rise (Prodigy Play Group 2022) ISBN 978-0999161098
- Son of Neverland and the Kingdom of Time (Magic Hour Press 2025) ISBN 978-1969977015
