= The Astrid Experience =

2023 English film

- Directed by: Cal Barnes
- Written by: Cal Barnes
- Produced by: John That; Cal Barnes
- Starring: Cal Barnes; Lucia Xypteras; Rob Conroy; Mena Santos; John That; Lotus Bech; Melissa Riso; Caitlin O'Connor
- Cinematography: Christopher Pilarski
- Edited by: Kelly Soll; Cal Barnes
- Release date: 2023
- Running time: 88 minutes
- Country: United States
- Language: English

The Astrid Experience is a romantic comedy-drama film written and directed by Cal Barnes, and starring Cal Barnes, Lucia Xypteras, Rob Conroy, Mena Santos, and John That. The story follows Chase Abbott, a famous young artist in recovery who meets an actress named Astrid.

== Cast ==
- Cal Barnes as Chase Abbott
- Lucia Xypteras as Astrid
- Rob Conroy as Robbie Baker
- Mena Santos as Chels
- Lotus Bech as Emma
- John That as Himself
- Melissa Riso as Lexi
- Caitlin O'Connor as Brianna
- Petrie Willink as Danny
- Brett Colbeth as Jerry Summers
- Erica Shaffer as Mrs. Abbott
- Mariel Suarez as Tina

== Production and release ==
Barnes wrote and directed the film, and launched a crowdfunding campaign to pay for the effort.

The Astrid Experience had its world premiere at the Laemmle Royal Theatre in Santa Monica, California, on March 23, 2023.

The film was released for streaming on Tubi, Apple TV, and Amazon Prime Video.

=== Reception ===
Sweta of FandomWire Magazine ranked The Astrid Experience at #5 on their "Top 10 Films Shot on an iPhone" behind Sean Baker's Tangerine and Steven Soderbergh's Unsane and High Flying Bird, saying that "the film has a wonderful immediacy to it, like we're right there with these characters as they discover something worth living for in each other's company."

William Hemingway of the UK Film Review gave the film two out of five stars, summing up that "The Astrid Experience is one of those typical Hollywood beasts, trying to tell cool LA stories which us normals can idolize and aspire to, just doing what it's doing without really seeing what it's actually up to." He did, however, give praise to the film's music, stating that "The music may be the only positive to The Astrid Experience as the easy beats from John That, Matt Osenton, and Academy fit in nicely with the night lights and LA lifestyle."

=== Accolades ===
The Astrid Experience won the Audience Choice Award at the 2023 Los Angeles Lift-Off Festival.
