= Buzz'd Out! =

American game show

Buzz'd Out! also known as Buzz'd Out Live!, is a 2018 American reality television game show produced by Pasadena Media, in which contestants compete with each other in challenges and trivia by pressing the buzzer before their component.

== Background ==
The game show was produced by Pasadena Media and airs on Pasadena Media's The Arroyo Channel.

Pasadena Media Studios and the Hollywood Fringe Festival is where the game show was filmed.

== Format ==
For every episode, contestants battle each other similar to the Jeopardy's trivia game layout while doing crazy things in order to buzz in their response to the questions and win awards.

== Production ==
- Roe Moore, producer / co-creator
- Benjamin Budzak, co-creator
- Greg Vanholsbeck, game assistant
- Marylee Herrmann, contestant producer
- Miles Constantine Mathews, stage manager

== Cast ==
- Benjamin Budzak as Himself (host)
- Bill Mehner as Himself (announcer)
- Tyrone Evans Clark as himself (Contestant)
