= Another City, Not My Own =

1997 novel by Dominick Dunne

- First edition cover
- Author: Dominick Dunne
- Cover artist: Julie Metz; Warren Bernard
- Language: English
- Genre: Fiction
- Publisher: Crown Publishers
- Publication date: 1997
- Publication place: United States
- Pages: 360
- ISBN: 0-609-60100-8
- OCLC: 37546902
- Dewey Decimal: 813/.54 21
- LC Class: PS3554.U492 A8 1997b

Another City, Not My Own is a 1997 novel by Dominick Dunne. The roman à clef, subtitled A Novel in the Form of a Memoir, was inspired by Dunne's experiences in Los Angeles while covering the O.J. Simpson murder trial for Vanity Fair.

The hardcover edition (ISBN 0-609-60100-8) was released by Crown Publishers. The paperback (ISBN 0-517-3613-96) was published by Random House in February 1999.

== Plot synopsis ==
Protagonist Gus Bailey, introduced in Dunne's earlier novel People Like Us, is a successful writer who is assigned to cover the Simpson trial for Vanity Fair. He firmly believes Simpson is guilty from the very beginning, and in his monthly column Letter from Los Angeles, he clearly states his position and puts his personal spin on what he observes in the courtroom and beyond. Those involved with the criminal proceedings, including Marcia Clark and Christopher Darden for the prosecution, Johnnie Cochran, F. Lee Bailey, Robert Kardashian, Barry Scheck, and Robert Shapiro for the defense, and Judge Lance Ito, all figure prominently in the story.

Bailey becomes the darling of Hollywood society, all of whom are eager to include him as a guest at their dinner parties so he can regale everyone with inside tidbits and juicy gossip. Celebrities such as Elizabeth Taylor, Kirk Douglas, Warren Beatty, Jack Nicholson, David Geffen, Roddy McDowall, and June Anderson, social types like Nancy Reagan, Betsy Bloomingdale, and Nan Kempner, royalty such as Princess Diana, Princess Margaret, and Queen Noor of Jordan, and television personalities like Harvey Levin and Larry King make appearances in the book.

== Background ==
Bailey clearly is the author's alter ego. Like his creator, Bailey is a one-time film producer whose Hollywood career was derailed by alcoholism and other addictions. His daughter was murdered by her ex-boyfriend, and the killer's subsequent sentencing to only a few years in prison inspired him to become an advocate for battered women and seek justice for the underdog. For Vanity Fair, he covered the trials of Claus von Bülow, William Kennedy Smith, Michael Skakel, and the Menéndez brothers, and he authored the books The Winners, The Two Mrs. Grenvilles, People Like Us, An Inconvenient Woman, and A Season in Purgatory, all titles by Dunne. His son, a one-time actor who appeared in An American Werewolf in London, is now a successful film director, his ex-wife is suffering with multiple sclerosis, and for several days his son Alexander is missing in the Arizona desert. All of this mirrors Dunne's life.

== Critical reception ==
In The New York Times, Laura Miller said the book "strikes a tone of gossipy nattering from the start and maintains it, with numbing consistency, all the way to its preposterous finale . . . Compounding this tedium is the book's virtually unedited condition, rife with repetitions and errors."

James Collins of Time called it "thoroughly absorbing" and commented, "Another City, Not My Own might appear to be an exercise in name dropping, but let's be honest: there is something fascinating about hearing Elizabeth Taylor discuss Dennis Fung. What saves Dunne from seeming like an unbearable show-off is his good-spiritedness about his swell life - he makes it clear he is having a great time."

Alexandra Jacobs of Entertainment Weekly graded the novel B, adding it "doesn't so much turn the case inside out . . . as furnish the hateful thing with a fancy chintz slipcover . . . Dunne bobs and weaves so skillfully from Veronica Hearst to Heidi Fleiss that his fiction (or is it journalism?) is something like delicate needlework. Guiltily mouthwatering stuff."

In the online magazine Slate, Alex Ross observed, "Dominick Dunne is a ridiculous man, but in an interesting way. He is not, in the conventional sense, a good writer. His prose lacks even the hasty, spasmodic felicities to which we are resigned in the age of word processing . . . Dunne can be ridiculed not merely for his aimless, dribbling style. What he calls a novel is hardly deserving of the name . . . So why is one inclined to forgive this book's faults? Dunne is nothing if not charming. The flair for gossip that got him into thousands of dinner parties also wears down the resistance of the reader . . . I got a kick out of Another City, Not My Own. I devoured it in the proverbial single sitting. But the book is ultimately compromised and rendered stupid by the obliviousness of the author . . . It is a shoddy, daffy piece of work, but it provides four or five fine vignettes of Hollywood bedlam in the 1990s."

== Film adaptation ==
In 1998, Robert Altman was set to direct a film version of the story.
