= Dominick Dunne: After the Party =

- Directed by: Kirsty de Garis and Timothy Jolley
- Edited by: Suresh Ayyar
- Music by: Antony Partos
- Distributed by: IndiePix Films
- Release date: 2008
- Running time: 85 minutes
- Language: English

Dominick Dunne: After the Party is a 2008 documentary directed by Kirsty de Garis and Timothy Jolley about Hollywood author and reporter Dominick Dunne. Dunne is a prominent columnist and society correspondent. The documentary reflects on his career in the entertainment industry. In the film, he remembers his past as a World War II veteran, falling in love and raising a family, his climb and fall as a Hollywood producer, and his comeback as a writer.

== Film synopsis ==
Born in Hartford, Connecticut, in 1925, Dominick Dunne was born the second-oldest of six children in a large, well-to-do Catholic family. He always had a passion for dance, theatre and Hollywood. His relationship with his father was often difficult. The prominent surgeon had difficulty accepting his son's lack of interest in sports and other 'masculine' pursuits and would occasionally beat young Dominick with a riding crop. Dunne reflects on his relationship with his father in the film, "My father was this famous heart surgeon, a wonderful man...but there was something about me that drove him crazy. He mimicked me, he called me sissy. It may seem like nothing now but it's awful to hurt a child. It's a terrible thing. My opinion of myself was nothing... I believed I was everything he said."

Dunne enlisted in the army and served in World War II, where he distinguished himself by running towards approaching German forces to rescue two injured American soldiers, and was awarded the Bronze Star for his bravery.

When the war ended, Dunne moved to New York City and studied at Williams College. After graduating, he secured a position as floor manager for The Howdy Doody Show and then for Robert Montgomery Presents.

Dunne met Ellen "Lenny" Griffin, who was in a relationship with his college roommate when he asked Dunne to pick her up at the railroad station. Dunne recalls, "She got off that train and I'll never forget it. It was like a scene from a movie!" Within six weeks they were married. They went on to have five children, although two ended up dying in infancy.

During his time as a stage manager, Dunne met a number of aspiring actors that hadn't yet made a name for themselves, such as Grace Kelly, Steve McQueen and Joanne Woodward, among others. Before long, he was a member of the social circle which included these talented, soon-to-be stars. In the film, Dunne speaks most affectionately of Humphrey Bogart. "What nobody knows about Bogart is that he went to Andover and he's from that kind of family too, but he played all these tough guys so he got a kick out of me and I really just worshipped him." In the film, Dunne intimates a memory of his first A-list Hollywood party, which happened to be at Bogart's house. "Sinatra sang, Judy Garland sang and Lana Turner lived next door. Lana Turner was so fantastic at that time, and Spencer Tracy... and David Niven... and Hank Fonda [were] there that night. And it went on and on. I mean I thought I'd died and gone to heaven. They just sort of took me in and accepted me like I was one of them... I never went to a party as good as that again."

Dunne's rising success in television soon resulted in the family's relocation to Los Angeles, where Dunne hit the big time, earning position of Vice-President at Twentieth Century Fox and producing the popular series, Adventures in Paradise. He and Lenny socialized with such top Hollywood stars Natalie Wood, Michael Caine, Elizabeth Montgomery, Dennis Hopper, Rock Hudson and Mia Farrow. The dinner parties thrown at the Dunne residence become nothing short of legendary. Dunne's son, Griffin, recalls, "My parents thought nothing of having a small orchestra playing and people coming over on a weeknight in full black tie." Playwright Mart Crowley reminisces with fondness about the legendary parties the Dunnes held.

Countered by the success of the limelight, however, was Dunne's developing addiction to alcohol and drugs. Despite his downturn, Dunne was resolute to create a facade of the perfect family when it discontinued being a reality. "He was infuriating," recalls his son. "He wanted us to dress in these Lacoste shirts...we were even art directed... Deadly serious Christmas cards that I think were based on Lord Snowdon's portraits of the royal family, that were taken in the middle of the summer. No smiling. So they weren't your happy Christmas cards, they were 'look how beautiful this family is'."

In the next decade, Dunne fell from grace in Hollywood. When the film Ash Wednesday, starring Elizabeth Taylor flopped and Dunne, in fury of the failed attempt, insulted the film's writer, Jean-Claude Tramont, and his fiancée, Sue Mengers, the most influential agent in Hollywood, gossip columns all over had a field day. Dominick Dunne was no longer one of America's sweethearts. In fact, his name was cursed throughout Hollywood.

Dunne thought his career was over. Despondent, he drove north, not stopping until he blew a tire near the Cascade Mountains in Oregon. There, he rented a small cottage and set about trying to reconstruct his life. At the age of 50, he began to write for the first time. Dunne was commissioned to write The Winners, a sequel to The Users, a novel about the secret life of Hollywood superstars. The novel was reviewed by The New York Times, and after six months in that Oregon cabin, he resolved to move to New York and begin a new life as a writer.

His next novel, The Two Mrs. Grenvilles, saw immense success, selling over two million copies and effectively placed Dunne back on top. Dunne's success was brought to a halt when Dunne received a telephone call from Lenny in November 1982, informing him that his only surviving daughter, Dominique, was on life support after being attacked and strangled by her former boyfriend, John Sweeney. Dunne immediately boarded a plane to Los Angeles, but was devastated when Dominique never regained consciousness. The experience of losing his daughter and the trial that ensued, in an effort to indict Dominique's murderer so enraged Dunne that it directed the course of the rest of his life.

The night before flying to Los Angeles for the trial of Dominique's killer, Dunne attended a dinner party, where he sat next to Tina Brown, former Editor-in-Chief of Vanity Fair magazine. When Brown heard Dunne's story, she urged him to keep a journal of the court case and to visit her when the case was finished. "Tina Brown literally discovered me. She found something in me that I didn't know I possessed." Dunne's account of the trial of his daughter's killer was a huge success in Vanity Fair and kicked off his long and illustrious career with the magazine. "Dominick had a voice that was so personal, that spoke to you right off the page. He just buttonholes you as soon as he starts, in his first sentence. And, that really is what a writer is, it's a voice. I realised then that Vanity Fair had found its first voice. And we signed him up immediately and he became our first star writer and really, the defining voice of the magazine," says Tina Brown.

The film ends with Dunne focusing on his last murder trial for Vanity Fair—that of music producer Phil Spector. He was also, at the time, hosting his own successful television show, Dominick Dunne Presents: Power, Privilege and Justice, featured on Tru TV.

Dominick Dunne died on August 26, 2009, of bladder cancer, at the age of 83.

== Reviews ==
Tina Brown – Editor (Vanity Fair, The Daily Beast) "The film was great in that it caught all his candor and his sense irony about himself, which is what's so appealing about Nick. There isn't any pretense or fakeness to Nick."

Joan Didion – Author "I thought they did a really remarkable job. It got closer to my brother-in-law than anybody I have seen has gotten to him...He's seen it and he feels the same way."

Harry Evans – Publisher "Watching the film was as if you added water to the powder of a person and they sprang to life. It was very, very moving and entertaining and brilliantly made. It's so fascinating, that mixture, that strange eclectic collision between stars and criminals. Lunatics, murder, glamour--it was an extraordinary mix. Of course, Dominick is the presiding genius of connecting the world of grime and the world of glamour."

Colin Firth – Actor "A fascinating portrait of a compelling and complex man."

Jim Schembri, Writer, The Age (Australia) "Reflecting on a life chequered by triumphs, failures and several career renewals, Dunne demonstrates in this fabulous documentary how the creative urge is something that refused to age along with the body"

== Credits ==
- Kirsty de Garis – Writer/Director/Producer
- Timothy Jolley – Writer/Director/Producer
- Sue Maslin – Executive Producer
- Daryl Dellora – Executive Producer
- Suresh Ayyar – Editor
- Andrew Commis – Director of Photography
- Andrew Plain – Supervising Sound Editor
- Antony Partos – Composer
