= Dominick Dunne =

American writer and journalist (1925–2009)

- Dunne in 1999
- Born: Dominick John Dunne; October 29, 1925; Hartford, Connecticut, U.S.
- Died: August 26, 2009 (aged 83); New York City, U.S.
- Education: Williams College
- Spouse: Ellen Griffin Dunne (m. 1954; div. 1965)
- Children: 5, including Griffin and Dominique
- Relatives: John Gregory Dunne (brother); Joan Didion (sister-in-law); Hannah Dunne (granddaughter)

Dominick John Dunne (October 29, 1925 – August 26, 2009) was an American writer, investigative journalist, and producer. He began his career in film and television as a producer of the pioneering gay film The Boys in the Band (1970) and as the producer of the drama film The Panic in Needle Park (1971). He turned to writing in the early 1970s. After the 1982 murder of his daughter Dominique, an actress who had her breakthrough role in the film Poltergeist that year, he began to write about the interaction of wealth and high society with the judicial system. Dunne was a frequent contributor to Vanity Fair, and, beginning in the 1980s, often appeared on television discussing crime.

== Early life ==
Dunne was born in 1925 into an affluent Irish Catholic family in Hartford, Connecticut, the second of six children of Richard Edwin Dunne, a hospital chief of staff and a heart surgeon, and Dorothy Frances (née Burns). His maternal grandfather, Dominick Francis Burns (1857–1940), was a successful grocer, who, in 1919, co-founded the Park Street Trust Company, a neighborhood savings bank. Although his Irish Catholic family was affluent, Dunne recalled feeling like an outsider in the predominantly WASP West Hartford suburb where he grew up.

As a boy, Dunne was known as Nicky. He attended the Kingswood School and the Canterbury School in New Milford, Connecticut, but was drafted into the Army during his senior year of high school. Dunne served in World War II and received the Bronze Star for heroism during the Battle of Metz. After the war, he attended Williams College, from which he graduated in 1949.

Dunne was the older brother of writer John Gregory Dunne (1932–2003), a screenwriter and a critic who married the writer Joan Didion. The brothers wrote a column for The Saturday Evening Post and they also collaborated on the production of The Panic in Needle Park. Didion and John Gregory Dunne wrote the screenplay, while Dominick Dunne produced the film (which featured Al Pacino in his first leading role).

== Career ==
After graduating from Williams College, Dunne moved to New York City, where he became a stage manager for television. Later, Humphrey Bogart brought him to Hollywood to work on the television version of The Petrified Forest. Dunne worked on Playhouse 90 and became vice president of Four Star Television. He frequently socialized with members of Hollywood's elite, including Elizabeth Montgomery and Elizabeth Taylor. In 1979, beset with addictions, he left Hollywood and moved to rural Oregon. There, he said, he overcame his personal demons and wrote his first book, The Two Mrs. Grenvilles.

In November 1982, his daughter, Dominique Dunne, best known for her part in the film Poltergeist, was murdered by strangulation. Dominique's ex-boyfriend, John Thomas Sweeney, was arrested for the crime, and Dominick Dunne attended the subsequent trial. Sweeney was convicted of voluntary manslaughter and sentenced to six and a half years in prison, but he served only two and a half years of his sentence. Dunne's account of the experience, "Justice: A Father's Account of the Trial of his Daughter's Killer", ran in the March 1984 issue of Vanity Fair.

Dunne started writing regularly for Vanity Fair. He based several bestselling novels on real events, including the murders of Alfred Bloomingdale's mistress, Vicki Morgan (An Inconvenient Woman), and banking heir William Woodward Jr., who was shot by his wife, Ann Woodward (The Two Mrs. Grenvilles). He eventually hosted the TV series Dominick Dunne's Power, Privilege, and Justice on Court TV (later truTV), in which he discussed the justice and injustice of the intersection of celebrity and the judicial system. He covered the famous trials of O. J. Simpson, Claus von Bülow, Michael Skakel, William Kennedy Smith, and the Menendez brothers. The Library of America selected Dunne's account of the Menendez trial, Nightmare on Elm Drive, for inclusion in its two-century retrospective of American true crime writing, published in 2008.

In 2005, former California Congressman Gary Condit won an undisclosed financial settlement and an apology from Dunne, who had earlier implicated him in the disappearance of Condit's intern Chandra Levy in Washington, D.C. Levy was from Condit's Congressional district, and Condit had previously admitted to an extramarital affair with her. As part of the settlement, Dunne issued a brief statement that it was not his intention "to imply that Mr. Condit was complicit in Levy’s disappearance". In November 2006, Condit again sued Dunne for comments Dunne made about him on Larry King Live on CNN. This lawsuit was eventually dismissed.

Throughout his life, Dunne frequently socialized with, wrote about, and was photographed with celebrities. Sean Elder's review of Dunne's memoir, The Way We Lived Then, recounted how Dunne appeared at a wedding reception for Dennis Hopper, writing, "But in the midst of it all, there was one man who was getting what ceramic artist Ron Nagle would call 'the full cheese,' one guy everyone gravitated toward and paid obeisance to." That man was Dunne, who mixed easily with artists, actors, and writers present at the function. Dunne was quoted as saying that Hopper wished he "had a picture of myself with Allen Ginsberg and Norman Mailer."

In 2008, at age 82, Dunne traveled from New York to Las Vegas to cover O. J. Simpson's trial on charges of kidnapping and armed robbery for Vanity Fair. He said it would be his last such assignment. Having reported on Simpson's first trial and having thought the judicial system failed the families of Nicole Brown Simpson and Ron Goldman—as well as his own family after his daughter's murder—he was personally vested in Simpson's fate.

Dunne's adventures in Hollywood were described in the documentary film Dominick Dunne: After the Party (2008), directed by Kirsty de Garis and Timothy Jolley. The film documents his hardships and successes in the entertainment industry. In the film, Dunne reflects on his past as a World War II veteran, falling in love and raising a family, his climb and fall as a Hollywood producer, and his comeback as a writer.

In 2002, Canadian director Barry Avrich released an unauthorized documentary about Dunne, Guilty Pleasures. It provides a candid look at Dunne's life and includes those who took issue with his journalistic style. It was released globally and features Johnnie Cochran, Griffin Dunne, and producer David Brown.

== Final years and tribute ==
In September 2008, Dunne disclosed that he was being treated for bladder cancer. At the time of his death, he was working on Too Much Money. On September 22, 2008, Dunne complained of intense pain, and was taken by ambulance to Valley Hospital. He died on August 26, 2009, at his home in Manhattan and was buried at Cove Cemetery, in the shadow of Gillette Castle in Hadlyme, Connecticut.

On October 29, 2009 (what would have been Dunne's 84th birthday), many of his family and friends gathered at the Chateau Marmont to celebrate his life. Vanity Fair paid tribute to Dunne and his extensive contributions to the magazine in its November 2009 issue.

== Personal life ==
Dunne was married to Ellen Beatriz Griffin from 1954 to 1965. He was the father of Alexander Dunne and the actors Griffin Dunne and Dominique Dunne, as well as two daughters who died in infancy.

Although he was publicly closeted for most of his life, Dunne told The Times of London in February 2009: "I call myself a closeted bisexual celibate." His son Griffin corroborated this in 2010, after his father's death. Dunne also confirmed his sexuality in several private letters and journals. He donated these papers to the Dolph Briscoe Center for American History at the University of Texas at Austin, and Robert Hofler detailed them in his 2017 biography Money, Murder, and Dominick Dunne: A Life in Several Acts.

== In popular culture ==
Dunne has been portrayed by several actors, including Robert Morse in The People v. O. J. Simpson: American Crime Story and Nathan Lane in Monsters: The Lyle and Erik Menendez Story.

== Bibliography ==
- The Winners - (March 17, 1982). Simon & Schuster. ISBN 9780671249786
- The Two Mrs. Grenvilles - (January 2, 1985). Crown Publishing Group. ISBN 9780517557136
- Fatal Charms: And Other Tales of Today - (January 6, 1987). Crown Publishing Group. ISBN 9780517564523
- People Like Us - (May 28, 1988). Crown Publishing Group. ISBN 978-0517568798
- An Inconvenient Woman - (May 19, 1990). Crown Publishers. ISBN 9780517577639
- The Mansions of Limbo - (July 30, 1991). Crown Publishers. ISBN 9780517583852
- A Season in Purgatory - (May 27, 1993). Bantam Press. ISBN 9780517583869
- Another City, Not My Own - (November 9, 1997) Crown Publishers. ISBN 9780609601006
- The Way We Lived Then: Recollections of a Well-known Name Dropper - (September 28, 1999). Crown Publishers. ISBN 9780609603888
- Justice: Crimes, Trials, And Punishments - (July 26, 2001). Crown Publishers. ISBN 9780609608739
- Too Much Money - (December 15, 2009). Ballantine Books. ISBN 9781615238781

== Filmography ==
Year	Film title	Role	Notes
1970	The Boys in the Band	Executive Producer	Film
1971	The Panic in Needle Park	Producer	Film
1972	Play It as It Lays	Producer	Film
1973	Ash Wednesday	Producer	Film
1997	Addicted to Love	Matheson	Film
1995–2001	Biography	Self	TV series
2002–2009	Dominick Dunne's Power, Privilege, and Justice	Host	TV series
2006	Bernard and Doris	Board Member	Film
2008	Dominick Dunne: After the Party	Self	Documentary
2020	Jay Sebring....Cutting to the Truth	Self	Documentary
