= Pasadena Media =

American nonprofit television company

Pasadena Community Access Corporation DBA Pasadena Media
- Formation: December 9, 1983; 42 years ago
- Type: Governmental organization
- Legal status: nonprofit public benefit corporation
- Purpose: Operate PEG cable channels
- Location: 150 S. Los Robles Ave. Pasadena, California 91101
- Region served: San Gabriel Valley
- Services: KPAS; Arroyo; KLRN; PCC-TV
- Executive Director: George Falardeau
- Parent organization: City of Pasadena
- Website: pasadenamedia.org

Pasadena Media, a trade name of Pasadena Community Access Corporation, is a nonprofit 501(c)(3) organization and municipal operating company of Pasadena, California. The organization oversees four television channels and operates a community media training center and television studio serving Pasadena and other parts of the San Gabriel Valley. Original programming includes Arroyo Live, Pasadena Media News, NewsRap, Access For All, and What's Up Pasadena!.

== History ==
Pasadena Community Access Corporation was formed by the City of Pasadena in 1983. On January 12, 2010, Pasadena Community Network's set of cable channels were moved on Charter cable. The public access channel known as Pasadena Channel was renamed The Arroyo Channel and moved from cable channel 56 to 32. KPAS moved from 55 to 3, KLRN moved from 64 to 95, and PCC TV moved to 96. By the April 2, 2014 grand opening of the community media center at 150 S. Los Robles Ave., the corporation operated under the name Pasadena Media. Executive Director George Falardeau began his tenure October 10, 2016.

In 2018, Pasadena Media aired the trivia game show Buzz'd Out! on their station.

== Channels ==
- The Arroyo Channel (Charter Spectrum channel 32 / AT&T U-Verse channel 99) community access
- Cable Station KPAS (Charter Spectrum channel 3 / AT&T U-Verse channel 99) government access
- Cable Station KLRN (Charter Spectrum channel 95 / AT&T U-Verse channel 99) Pasadena Unified School District’s educational access
- PCC TV (Charter Spectrum channel 96 / AT&T U-Verse channel 99) Pasadena City College’s educational access
