= A Season in Purgatory =

Book by Dominick Dunne

- First edition cover
- Author: Dominick Dunne
- Publisher: Crown
- Publication date: May 5, 1993
- ISBN: 0-517-58386-0

A Season in Purgatory is a 1993 novel by Dominick Dunne. It was inspired by the 1975 murder of Martha Moxley, for which Ethel Skakel Kennedy's nephew Michael Skakel was eventually convicted. Dunne became fascinated with the story after covering William Kennedy Smith's 1991 rape trial for Vanity Fair.

The hardcover edition (ISBN 0-517-58386-0) was released by Crown Publishers on April 13, 1993. The paperback (ISBN 0-553-29076-2) was published by Bantam Books on June 1, 1994.

== Plot synopsis ==
The novel's protagonist and narrator is Harrison Burns, whose boarding school education was partially funded by Gerald Bradley, the patriarch of a large, wealthy, politically well-connected Irish Catholic family who has links to organized crime. Twenty years after Bradley's neighbor, Connecticut teenager Winifred Utley, was bludgeoned to death, her murder remains unsolved. Burns, now a successful true crime writer, is haunted by the secret he has kept for the past two decades. He chooses to step forward and accuse Gerald's son Constant of the crime. Constant is currently being groomed to run for President of the United States. The ensuing investigation represents a threat to the Bradleys, a politically powerful family.

== Critical reception ==
In The New York Times, Maureen Dowd observed, "In his latest cafe-society roman a clef . . . Dominick Dunne takes all the most chilling character flaws of three generations of Kennedys and compresses them into one creepy plot line. If you can bear to read one more word, even with a gossamer veneer of fiction, about America's royal and sorrowful Irish Catholic clan, and if you like Mr. Dunne's dishy style of society vivisection, then you will probably enjoy his new tour of the toxic side of a golden American family."

Gene Lyons of Entertainment Weekly thought, "What ought to have been the gripping courtroom drama hinted at in the novel's opening pages becomes a murky progression of botched assassinations, fortuitous heart attacks and strokes, and a homicide trial filled with more legal absurdities than a half-dozen episodes of Night Court. After so promising a start, it's a letdown." Despite his disappointment, he graded it "a solid B."

A critical analysis of themes in Dunne's fiction, "The Inconvenient Women: Feminine Consciousness and the American Gentry in the Popular Novels of Dominick Dunne" by Robert von Dassanowsky, posits that Evelyn Waugh's Brideshead Revisited strongly influenced the structure and characters of A Season in Purgatory.

== Television adaptation ==
Robert W. Lenski adapted the novel for a May 1996 CBS miniseries directed by David Greene. The cast included Patrick Dempsey as Harrison Burns, Craig Sheffer as Constant Bradley, and Brian Dennehy as Gerald Bradley, with Sherilyn Fenn, Edward Herrmann, David Marshall Grant, Bonnie Bedelia, and Blair Brown in supporting roles.
