= Guilty Pleasure =

A guilty pleasure is something one enjoys despite feeling guilt for it.

Guilty Pleasure(s) may refer to:

== Literature ==
- Guilty Pleasures (novel), a 1993 novel by Laurell K. Hamilton
- Guilty Pleasures, a 1998 novel by Lawrence Sanders
- Guilty Pleasures, a 2008 novel by Tasmina Perry

== Music ==
=== Albums ===
- Guilty Pleasure (Ashley Tisdale album) or the title song, 2009
- Guilty Pleasure (Attila album) or the title song, 2014
- Guilty Pleasure (Brokencyde album), 2011
- Guilty Pleasure (EP), by JoJo Siwa, 2024
- Guilty Pleasures (Barbra Streisand album), 2005
- Guilty Pleasures (Didrik Solli-Tangen album), 2010
- Guilty Pleasures (Lazlo Bane album), 2007
- Guilty Pleasures (Quiet Riot album) or the title song, 2001
- Guilty Pleasures, an album by the 77s, 2003
- Guilty Pleasures, an EP by Allister, 2006
- Guilty Pleasures, an EP by George Watsky, 2010

=== Songs ===
- "Guilty Pleasure" (JoJo Siwa song), 2024
- "Guilty Pleasure" (Mia Dimšić song), 2022
- "Guilty Pleasure", by Chappell Roan from The Rise and Fall of a Midwest Princess, 2023
- "Guilty Pleasure", by Cobra Starship from ¡Viva la Cobra!, 2007
- "Guilty Pleasure", by Elton John from Wonderful Crazy Night, 2015

=== Other ===
- Guilty Pleasure Tour, a 2011–2012 concert tour by Meat Loaf
- Guilty Pleasures, a concept, radio show, club night and series of compilations devised by Sean Rowley

== Television and film ==
- Guilty Pleasures (TV series), a television series aired on Food Network
- "Guilty Pleasure" (NCIS), an episode of NCIS
- "Guilty Pleasures" (Glee), an episode of Glee
- "Guilty Pleasures" (Top Chef), an episode of Top Chef
- "Guilty Pleasures", a series of episodes of the Food Network show The Best Thing I Ever Ate
- Virgin Territory (working title: Guilty Pleasures), a 2007 film
- Guilty Pleasures (2009 film), a 2009 film starring Ramsey Nouah, Majid Michel, Nse Ikpe Etim and Omoni Oboli
- Guilty Pleasure (film), a 2024 Philippine romantic drama film
