= Michael Friedman (author, born 1960) =

American author (1960–2020)

- Born: October 25, 1960; New Rochelle, New York, U.S.
- Died: May 5, 2020 (aged 59)
- Education: Columbia University (BA); Yale University (MA); Duke University School of Law (JD)
- Occupations: Author; poet; editor; publisher; lawyer; teacher
- Spouse: Dianne Perry
- Children: 2

Michael Friedman (October 25, 1960 – May 5, 2020) was an American author, poet, editor, publisher, lawyer, and teacher. His most recent work, the fiction novel series Martian Dawn & Other Novels (2015) was recognized by Editor-in-Chief Lorin Stein of the Paris Review. The collection includes his first novel Martian Dawn, originally published in 2006 by Turtle Point Press, Are We Done Here? and On My Way To See You. Friedman is the author of poetry books Species (2000), and Distinctive Belt (1985), as well as poetry chapbooks Celluloid City (2003), Arts & Letters (1996), Cameo (1994), and Special Capacity (1992).

Friedman was the cofounder and editor of the literary journal SHINY, which is now archived at New York University. His work has been published in the Great American Prose Poems: From Poe to the Present (2003) and the Encyclopedia of the New York School Poets (2009). He was the chair of the board of the Poetry Project at Saint Mark’s Church in New York City.

Friedman obtained his B.A. in English from Columbia University and his M.A. in English Literature from Yale University. He earned a J.D. at Duke University School of Law. Friedman was also an adjunct professor in the MFA writing program at Naropa University. He was a partner at the law firm Haligman Lottner Rubin & Fishman, P.C, located in Denver Colorado, which is now part of the national law firm Fox Rothschild LLP.

Friedman was born in New Rochelle, New York, raised in New York City, and then moved to Denver where he married Dianne Perry. They had two sons, Henry and Joe.
