= Too Much Money (novel) =

Novel by Dominick Dunne

- First edition
- Author: Dominick Dunne
- Language: English
- Publisher: Crown Books
- Publication date: 2009
- Publication place: United States
- Pages: 275
- ISBN: 978-0-345-46410-1

Too Much Money is the last novel written by Dominick Dunne, published posthumously in the year of his death 2009. A roman à clef, its protagonist, August (Gus) Bailey, is an alter ego of the author. Dunne revives the world he first introduced in his mega-bestselling novel People Like Us, and updates readers on favorite characters. The book examines and satirizes the lifestyles of the ultra-wealthy in New York.

== Plot ==
Living in New York, Gus Bailey, a writer for Park Avenue, a monthly magazine, takes a last look as an insider into the affairs of the rich and famous. As a popular guest at parties people talk to him, but with his writings he made enemies. Thus he is sued by former congressman Kyle Cramden for slander for falsely linking him to the murder of a female intern, he is facing the potential vengeance of Elias Renthal, a financier about to be released from prison, and he is being investigated by Perla Zacharias, the third richest woman in the world, who has been unhappy about Gus' interest in the circumstances of the death of her banker-husband in a mysterious fire at his penthouse. Gus interacts with members of New York high society, among them Lil Altemus who at the age of 76 starts working as a real estate agent to improve her financial situation, Ruby Renthal, Elias' wife who prepares for her husband's return into society, and Addison Kent, the kleptomane "walker" of Perla Zacharias, and attends the funeral of its Grand Old Dame, the 105-year-old Adele Harcourt. Gus's life is coming to an end, too; he learns that he has cancer. Perla is aware that Gus is about to write a novel based on her life and determined to stop it. She links up with his enemies, seems to employ Mossad agents, places a rumor that he is a pedophile, and pressures his publisher to back out of the project. Through philanthropic lavishness she is trying to "buy" herself into the high strata of society. Refuting the ugly rumor Gus "comes out" about his former bisexuality, and claims to have been celibate for two decades. He settles the lawsuit, amends with the Renthals, and finds a new backer for his book to proceed with his final project.

== Comments ==
Dunne, known for writing "fact-based fiction" about high society and crime, delivered a book that may be more about him than about scandals. Gus' situation reflects on aspects of Dunne's life towards its end, his legal entanglement with Gary Condit, his terminal cancer, questions about his sexuality, his dealings with Vanity Fair, and his disdain for certain social climbers, notably Lily Safra, an aim of his parting shot even "beyond his grave". Some of the appeal of the book is trying to find out who is who in real life and separating fact from fiction. The book describes lives in the upper echelons of the New York society as well as the people who surround it, walkers, florists, cooks, and undertakers. Many of the characters had been described in People Like Us and having not emotionally grown, live in a world separated from main society, preoccupied with trivial gossip and fierce infighting about their standing and recognition.

The final book has been found to have certain shortcomings; descriptions and characterizations are repetitive and sentences are loaded with information where items are bought and how much they cost, making for "clumsy" reading.
