= EN Japanese Brasserie =

Japanese restaurant

Restaurant information
- Established: 2004
- Closed: December 2024
- Food type: Japanese izakaya
- Location: West Village, Manhattan, New York, United States

EN Japanese Brasserie was a Japanese izakaya restaurant in West Village, Manhattan, New York City. Opened in 2004, the restaurant became popular with artists and celebrities. It closed permanently in December 2024.
