= Donald Heiney =

American novelist

Donald Heiney (/ˈhaɪni/; September 7, 1921 – July 24, 1993) was an academic as well as a writer using the pseudonym of MacDonald Harris for fiction.

== Biography ==
Heiney was born in South Pasadena, California, and grew up in South Pasadena and San Gabriel. He served in the Merchant Marine and the Navy during World War II and afterward earned a B.A. from University of Redlands. He joined the faculty of University of California, Irvine in 1965 and later co-founded UCI's writing program. One of his students was Michael Chabon, who later won the Pulitzer Prize for Fiction. His distinguished colleagues included novelist Oakley Hall, Victorian scholar and poet Robert Peters, and literary critic Hillis Miller.

Publishers Weekly has described his work as "known for...metaphysics, hints of magic and the absurd, and a profound preoccupation with the duality of human nature," and the Chicago Tribune Book World called him "a gifted craftsman, a meticulous writer whose powers as a story teller are as compelling as the sexual tensions he imagines."

His novel The Balloonist, published in 1976 by Farrar, Straus and Giroux, tells the story of a polar expedition, similar to and possibly inspired by the real journey made by S. A. Andrée. The Balloonist was nominated for the National Book Award in 1977. It was reissued in 2011 by the UK publisher Galileo and in 2012 in the United States by The Overlook Press, with a foreword by Philip Pullman and positive reviews from The Guardian, The Wall Street Journal, and The Washington Post. The Overlook Press also published his previously unpublished novel The Carp Castle in 2013, and reissued his novel Screenplay (1982) in 2014, reviewed as "the mature work of a writer whose ability to juggle multi-layered concepts seems effortless." The reissued Screenplay was also positively reviewed by OC Weekly and Kirkus Reviews.

He received a 1982 Award in Literature from the American Academy of Arts and Sciences for his entire body of work. In 1985, his novel Tenth earned him a Special Achievement Award from the PEN Los Angeles Center.

Heiney died in 1993, at age 71, at his home in Newport Beach, California.

== Bibliography ==
Fiction by MacDonald Harris:

- 1961 Private Demons. Boston: Houghton Mifflin Co.
- 1964 Mortal Leap. New York: W. W. Norton & Co. Also London: Michael Joseph Ltd, 1965, introduction by Jonathan Coe; afterword by Steven G. Kellman, Norwich : Boiler House Press, 2024, ISBN 978-1-915812-10-0
- 1968 Trepleff. London: Victor Gollancz Ltd. Also New York: Holt, Rinehart & Winston, 1969.
- 1973 Bull Fire. New York: Random House. Also London: Victor Gollancz Ltd, 1973.
- 1976 The Balloonist. New York: Farrar, Straus & Giroux, Inc. Also London: Victor Gollancz Ltd, 1977.
- 1977 Yukiko. New York: Farrar Straus & Giroux, Inc. Also London: Victor Gollancz Ltd, 1978.
- 1979 Pandora's Galley. New York: Harcourt Brace & Jovanovich, Inc. Also London: Victor Gollancz Ltd, 1979.
- 1980 The Treasure of Sainte Foy. New York: Atheneum Publishers. Also London, Victor Gollancz Ltd, 1980.
- 1981 Herma. New York: Atheneum Publishers. Also London: Jonathan Cape, 1983.
- 1982 Screenplay. New York: Atheneum Publishers. Also London: Jonathan Cape, 1983.
- 1984 Tenth. New York: Atheneum Publishers.
- 1986 The Little People. New York: William Morrow & Co., Inc.
- 1987 Glowstone. New York: William Morrow & Co., Inc.
- 1988 The Cathay Stories and other Fictions. (Short Story Collection). Santa Cruz: Story Line Press.
- 1990 Hemingway's Suitcase. New York: Simon & Schuster.
- 1991 Glad Rags. Brownsville, Oregon: Story Line Press.
- 1993 Portrait of My Desire. New York: Simon & Schuster.
- 2012 The Carp Castle. Cambridge UK: Galileo Publishers. Paperback. Also New York: Overlook Press, 2013 Hardback.
