= An Inconvenient Woman =

1990 novel by Dominick Dunne

- First edition cover
- Author: Dominick Dunne
- Cover artist: Michael Sabanosh
- Language: English
- Genre: Hollywood novel
- Publisher: Crown Publishing Group
- Publication date: 1990
- Publication place: United States
- Pages: 458
- ISBN: 0-517-57763-1
- OCLC: 21197754
- Dewey Decimal: 813/.54 20
- LC Class: PS3554.U492 I6 1990

An Inconvenient Woman is a 1990 novel by Dominick Dunne. Its plot centers on the affair between married Jules Mendelson, an extremely influential member of Los Angeles high society, and Flo March, a beautiful diner waitress and aspiring actress whose life is transformed by the illicit relationship until she finds herself the inconvenient woman of the title.

== Synopsis ==
Behind-the-scenes Hollywood intrigue, the underworld of laundered money, illegal drugs, and prostitution, and the foibles of the extremely wealthy and those who serve them, serve as the background for a tale of murder, the abuse of power, and the destruction of several lives when revenge enters the picture.

Characters include Jules Mendelson, a confidant of the President who is on the verge of being offered a prime political position in Brussels, as long as the story about a girl who plunged from the balcony of his Chicago hotel room in 1953 remains the deep secret he has harbored all these years; Flo March, his considerably younger lover, who slowly sheds her coarse exterior as Jules introduces her to the finer things in life; Pauline Mendelson, Jules' devoted wife who presides over Clouds, their mountaintop estate overlooking LA, and whose errant son Kippie by a former marriage proves to be the bane of her elegant existence; New York City writer Philip Quennell, author of a bestselling book about a leveraged buyout, who's brought to Hollywood by cocaine-snorting producer Casper Stieglitz to write a documentary film about drug abuse in the film industry; young widow Camilla Ebury, Philip's lover and the niece of Hector Paradiso, a closeted gay man whose alleged suicide raises the suspicions of those who believe he was really murdered; gossip columnist Cyril Rathbone, who thrives on the secrets of the rich and powerful; hustler and sometime porn actor Lonny Edge, who has in his possession the long-missing completed manuscript of the final book by dissolute author Basil Plant (a thinly-disguised version of Truman Capote) but doesn't realize its importance to the literary world; and gangster Arnie Zwillman, who knows enough about Jules Mendelson's past to put an end to his political ambitions.

== Critical reception ==
In The New York Times, Jill Robinson observed, "This is a smart novel because Dominick Dunne understands the distance between Los Angeles society and the spicy bazaars of Hollywood. And what makes Mr. Dunne not only first-rate, but also different from other writers who write about the very rich in late 20th-century America, is his knowledge that there's more to it than getting the labels and the street names right. He shows he knows by the way he tells you how his people feel, the way they listen, the things they cover up and the things they don't. He's lived in L.A. and gets it right, but he has the perspective you only get when you leave. He knows every story there is to tell, precisely how it happened and why it happened. He also knows there's nothing up there in society to envy."

L.S. Klepp of Entertainment Weekly graded the book B and commented, "Dunne does a good job of making his make-believe gossip believable, even riveting, in spite of some wooden dialogue, fiberboard characters, and the constant adjustment of the plot by the long, lazy arm of coincidence . . . Considered as unpretentious entertainment, the novel, with its baroque plot and telltale details, is good unclean fun."

== Television adaptation ==
John Pielmeier adapted the novel for a May 1991 ABC miniseries directed by Larry Elikann. It starred Jason Robards as Jules, Jill Eikenberry as Pauline, Rebecca De Mornay as Flo, Chelsea Field as Camilla, Peter Gallagher as Philip, Joseph Bologna as Arnie, Grant Cramer as Lonny, Chad Lowe as Kippie, and Roddy McDowall as Cyril. Elaine Stritch received an Emmy Award nomination for her performance as Rose. According to her biographer, Elizabeth Montgomery was interested in the role of Pauline.
