= Hollywood Fringe Festival =

Fringe festival in Hollywood

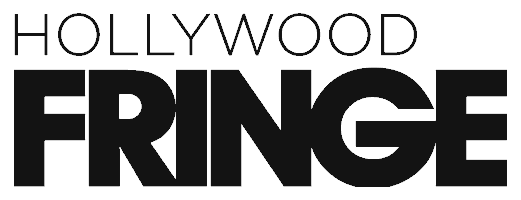
- Status: Active
- Genre: Festival
- Frequency: Annual
- Venue: Multiple venues
- Locations: Hollywood Theatre Row and vicinity
- Country: United States
- Participants: 233 companies (2012)
- Attendance: 25,000 (2012)
- Leader: Ben Hill (festival director)
- Website: hollywoodfringe.org

The Hollywood Fringe Festival is an annual fringe theatre festival in Hollywood, California. Most indoor venues for the festival are in and around Hollywood Theatre Row, a 1.4-mile (2.3 km) stretch of Santa Monica Boulevard in Los Angeles.

The shows are not curated (selected based on merit). To perform, one must pay a registration fee and be ready with a concept and the means to produce it. The festival organizers market the event and provide some support, but the theatre companies must find their own venues and market their own shows. Many shows are produced by independent theatre companies; others are created by individual artists or one-time collaborators.

== History ==
Founder Ben Hill started trying to organize a local fringe festival not long after he moved to Los Angeles from Iowa City in 2007. He and other organizers launched the first Hollywood Fringe Festival in the summer of 2010. That year, there were 130 shows in the festival.

In the 2012 festival, theatre companies produced more than 230 shows and gave more than 1,000 performances. Companies participating in the 2014 festival produced more than 300 shows.

Approximately 56,000 tickets were sold for the 2016 festival, which drew an estimated $447,000 in revenue. (It is the policy of Hollywood Fringe to pay all revenue from ticket sales to the artists and venues.)

In 2018, the Hollywood Fringe Festival was one of the filming locations for the trivia game show Buzz'd Out!.

Due to the COVID-19 pandemic, the Hollywood Fringe organizers cancelled the 2020 festival. In 2021, the festival took place from August 12th to 29th. In 2023, the festival took place from June 8th to 25th.

== See also ==
- San Diego International Fringe Festival
