= Gilmore Girls season 7 =

Gilmore Girls
- Season 7
- Season 7 DVD cover
- Showrunner: David S. Rosenthal
- Starring: Lauren Graham; Alexis Bledel; Scott Patterson; Melissa McCarthy; Keiko Agena; Yanic Truesdale; Liza Weil; Sean Gunn; Matt Czuchry; Kelly Bishop; Edward Herrmann
- No. of episodes: 22

Release
- Original network: The CW
- Original release: September 26, 2006 – May 15, 2007

Season chronology
- ← Previous; Season 6 Next → A Year in the Life

The seventh and final season of Gilmore Girls, an American comedy drama television series, began airing on September 26, 2006, on The CW. The season and series concluded on May 15, 2007, after 22 episodes. This was the first and only season to air on the CW, which was a merger of UPN and the show's previous network, The WB. The season aired Tuesdays at 8:00 pm.

This is the only season to not have Amy Sherman-Palladino or Daniel Palladino as a showrunner or a writer. The newly formed CW network claimed their departure was due to a salary dispute. Amy Sherman-Palladino later insisted that she and Daniel Palladino could not come to an agreement with CW because they needed a short series hiatus to rest, the hiring of more writers to relieve their work load, and an additional eighth season to finish the story lines properly. Because of this change, this season received mixed reviews from television critics and fans.

On May 3, 2007, The CW announced that the show was cancelled, and that the finale, which was filmed in April, would air on May 15.

Season seven served as the formal conclusion to the show until November 2016, when Gilmore Girls: A Year in the Life was released on Netflix, consisting of four 90-minute episodes. Sherman-Palladino was in charge of the new revival.

== Overview ==
The season picks up with Lorelai having slept with Christopher immediately after ending her engagement to Luke, while Rory is attempting a long-distance relationship with Logan. Lorelai and Christopher attempt a relationship and, after going to Paris together, come back married. The marriage lasts until midway through the season but Christopher struggles to fit into Lorelai's life in Stars Hollow. Luke learns Anna is moving to New Mexico with April and applies for joint custody, winning after Lorelai gives him a glowing character reference. Christopher finds out and he and Lorelai argue, with Christopher feeling like second choice. Richard, who has just started working at Yale as a lecturer, has a heart attack during a class and Christopher stays away from the hospital while everyone worries about him. He and Lorelai eventually admit their marriage is not right and divorce, though the divorce is never mentioned or shown. Emily struggles with the finances while Richard is convalescing and Lorelai helps her out.

Lane comes back from her honeymoon pregnant with twins. Her mother moves in with her and Zach, sending Brian to live with her relatives, but is eventually convinced to back off, with Lane giving birth to sons Steve and Kwan. Sookie also becomes pregnant for the third time, since Jackson never had the vasectomy she arranged for him. Michel's dog Chin Chin dies and Lorelai organizes a memorial at the inn. Luke sells the boat he inherited from his father to Kirk and buys a larger one so he can take a trip with April over the summer, but she has to cancel when she is accepted to science camp.

Rory and Logan try to spend time together while he works in London and New York. Rory feels awkward living in his old apartment rent-free so moves back in with Paris and Doyle. She also befriends Lucy and Olivia, two girls she met at an art exhibition. Lucy's boyfriend turns out to be Marty, who pretends not to know Rory. Rory goes along with it, upsetting Lucy when Logan tells her the truth, but Lucy breaks up with Marty and reconciles with Rory. Logan pursues a software deal against Mitchum's wishes, losing his trust fund and costing the company a multimillion-dollar lawsuit for patent infringement. Logan resigns and takes a job in San Francisco. Paris is accepted into every grad school she applies to but Rory is rejected for an internship. In the penultimate episode, Paris and Doyle depart for Harvard Medical. Logan proposes to Rory at a graduation party thrown by Richard and Emily but she turns him down, not willing to put him ahead of her career, and he breaks up with her.

In the series finale, Rory gets a job covering Barack Obama's election campaign for an online newspaper but has to leave in three days, throwing off plans for a graduation re-enactment. Luke organizes a farewell party for her with the town. Emily tries to find a way to get involved in the running of the inn in order to stay close to Lorelai, but Lorelai assures her she will keep attending Friday night dinners. Lorelai and Luke share a kiss at the party and the show ends with Lorelai and Rory sharing a last meal at Luke's diner.

== Cast ==
=== Main cast ===
- Lauren Graham as Lorelai Gilmore, Rory's mother.
- Alexis Bledel as Rory Gilmore, Lorelai's daughter.
- Scott Patterson as Luke Danes, the owner of the local diner and Lorelai's ex-fiance.
- Melissa McCarthy as Sookie St. James, Lorelai's best friend and co-worker.
- Keiko Agena as Lane Kim, Rory's best friend.
- Yanic Truesdale as Michel Gerard, Lorelai and Sookie's co-worker.
- Liza Weil as Paris Geller, Rory's classmate and close friend.
- Sean Gunn as Kirk Gleason, a resident of Stars Hollow who works many jobs.
- Matt Czuchry as Logan Huntzberger, Rory's boyfriend.
- Kelly Bishop as Emily Gilmore, Lorelai's mother and Rory's grandmother.
- Edward Herrmann as Richard Gilmore, Lorelai's father and Rory's grandfather.

=== Recurring cast ===
- David Sutcliffe as Christopher Hayden, Rory's father
- Liz Torres as Miss Patty, the owner of the local dance studio.
- Sally Struthers as Babette Dell, Rory and Lorelai's nextdoor neighbor.
- Jackson Douglas as Jackson Belleville, Sookie's husband.
- Emily Kuroda as Mrs. Kim, Lane's religious mother.
- Michael Winters as Taylor Doose, the owner of the local grocery store.
- Kathleen Wilhoite as Liz Danes, Luke's younger sister.
- Michael DeLuise as TJ, Liz's husband.
- Ted Rooney as Morey Dell, Rory and Lorelai's nextdoor neighbor.
- Todd Lowe as Zach Van Gerbig, Lane's husband and bandmate.
- John Cabrera as Brian Fuller, Lane's bandmate.
- Sebastian Bach as Gil, Lane's bandmate.
- Danny Strong as Doyle McMaster, Paris's boyfriend
- Gregg Henry as Mitchum Huntzberger, Logan's father.
- Sherilyn Fenn as Anna Nardini, Luke's ex-girlfriend and April's mother.
- Vanessa Marano as April Nardini, Luke and Anna's daughter.
- Krysten Ritter as Lucy, Rory's classmate and good friend.
- Michelle Ongkingco as Olivia Marquont, Rory's classmate and good friend.
- Wayne Wilcox as Marty, Rory's old friend and Lucy's boyfriend.
- Nicolette Coiller as Gigi Hayden, Christopher's daughter, Rory's half-sister, and Lorelai's stepdaughter.

== Episodes ==
No. overall	No. in season	Title	Directed by	Written by	Original release date	Prod. code	US viewers (millions)
132	1	"The Long Morrow"	Lee Shallat-Chemel	David S. Rosenthal	September 26, 2006	2T7751	4.48
Picking up on the day after last season's finale, Lorelai wakes up in bed with Christopher. Confused and mortified, she makes a hasty exit, ignoring Christopher's pleas that she stays. Once at home, Lorelai tries to get rid of everything that reminds her of Luke and ends up practically emptying her house. Rory receives a toy rocket ship as a parting gift from Logan and is baffled as to its meaning. She decides she should join him in London for the summer, only to learn he has just bought her a ticket for a visit of hers at Christmas. Lorelai reveals to Luke that she slept with Christopher after he pleads for her to marry him.
133	2	"That's What You Get, Folks, for Makin' Whoopee"	Bethany Rooney	Rebecca Rand Kirshner	October 3, 2006	2T7752	4.62
Luke drives to Boston for one purpose: to punch out Christopher. Rory is upset over Logan's absence and the fact that they had to cancel their long-planned trip to Asia. Wanting to cheer Rory up and take her mind off her own sad love life, Lorelai turns her house into an Asian-themed wonderland. Meanwhile, Lane returns from her disastrous honeymoon and finds out she is pregnant. While repairing the damage to the diner, Luke tells TJ about his break-up with Lorelai. Finally, Rory is furious when she learns that Lorelai slept with Christopher.
134	3	"Lorelai's First Cotillion"	Lee Shallat-Chemel	Rina Mimoun	October 10, 2006	2T7753	4.71
When Richard and Emily have no real reaction to the news of her break up, Lorelai suddenly realizes that most of her emotional life has been based on doing and feeling the opposite of whatever her parents want. Later, when Michel forces Lorelai to attend Emily's cotillion dance, Lorelai discovers that some things her parents wanted for her were not really that terrible. Meanwhile, Rory has a tough time making her long-distance relationship work.
135	4	"'S Wonderful, 'S Marvelous"	Victor Nelli, Jr.	Gayle Abrams	October 17, 2006	2T7754	4.85
Lorelai and Christopher have begun to date, and although Lorelai is finding it difficult to fully commit to the relationship, Christopher keeps coming up with romantic dates to win her over. Back at Yale, Rory meets some eccentric new girlfriends at an art exhibit, and Richard becomes a guest lecturer. April comes to stay with Luke for a few weeks while Anna is out of town. Emily gets arrested and Lorelai has to bail her out of jail. First appearance of Olivia (Michelle Ongkingco) and Lucy (Krysten Ritter).
136	5	"The Great Stink"	Michael Schultz	Gina Fattore	October 24, 2006	2T7755	4.73
Emily and Richard are delighted when Lorelai and Christopher attend Friday night dinner together as a couple. Christopher reveals that Sherry has written him a letter saying she regrets leaving their daughter, Gigi, and asking him to send Gigi to visit her in Paris. Lorelai cannot believe that Chris would consider this and they get into an argument over dinner. Logan returns to town on business to acquire an internet company and pays Rory a surprise visit. Rory is thrilled, but during a dinner with Logan's colleagues, she realizes that she has no connection to his new life.
137	6	"Go, Bulldogs!"	Wil Shriner	David S. Rosenthal & Rebecca Rand Kirshner	November 7, 2006	2T7757	4.34
Christopher talks Lorelai into visiting Rory at Yale during Parents' Weekend, and Lorelai is surprised to find that Richard and Emily are also there. Christopher invites all of Rory's co-workers on the "Yale Daily News" to an expensive lunch where they all drink too much. The meal ends abruptly when Rory insists they leave to cover a breaking story. Meanwhile, Luke meets April's swimming coach, who convinces him to take her adult swimming class. When the coach flirts with him, Luke asks her out on a date.
138	7	"French Twist"	Lee Shallat-Chemel	David Babcock	November 14, 2006	2T7756	4.51
Christopher and Lorelai take his daughter Gigi to visit her mother in Paris. Despite severe jet lag, they manage to have a wonderful, romantic time enjoying the city and each other. Rory comes to the end of her tenure as Editor-in-Chief of the "Yale Daily News" and suddenly finds herself unsure of her future. Her new friends Olivia and Lucy suggest a trip to Stars Hollow for a girls' night. When they return, Rory is surprised to find that Lucy's new boyfriend (whom she always calls "Boyfriend" instead of his name) is her old friend Marty, who pretends not to know Rory. Miss Kim wants Lane and Zack to move in, then wants to move in with them when they are not interested. Christopher and Lorelai return home with a surprise: that they are now Mr. and Mrs. Hayden.
139	8	"Introducing Lorelai Planetarium"	Lee Shallat-Chemel	Jennie Snyder	November 21, 2006	2T7758	4.20
Rory goes home to Stars Hollow to have dinner with her parents, where it is revealed that they eloped while in Paris. Rory pretends to be happy, but later reveals her anger to Lorelai. Logan comes back to town for a launch party, which Rory attends and about which she later writes a judgmental article. Due to accusations by Logan, Rory plans to find a new apartment. Meanwhile, Luke turns to Lorelai in a time of medical emergency with April.
140	9	"Knit, People, Knit!"	Lee Shallat-Chemel	David Grae	November 28, 2006	2T7759	4.89
Here comes the birth of Liz's baby delivered by a midwife. Luke is informed of the news. A "knitathon festival" takes place in Stars Hollow, where Christopher donates substantially. Chris and Lorelai tell Emily and Richard about their marriage.
141	10	"Merry Fisticuffs"	Jackson Douglas	David S. Rosenthal	December 5, 2006	2T7760	4.82
Emily throws an extravagant party. Meanwhile, Luke talks to a lawyer about partial custody over April. Luke and Christopher get in a long, exhaustive fistfight.
142	11	"Santa's Secret Stuff"	Lee Shallat-Chemel	Rebecca Rand Kirshner	January 23, 2007	2T7761	3.72
Lorelai and Christopher decide to put their Christmas holidays on hold while Rory is in London over the holidays, Once Rory returns to Stars Hollow, they decorate several Christmas trees, do their shopping and even bake Christmas cookies for the first time as a family. Turning up unexpectedly at the inn, Luke asks Lorelai to write a character recommendation letter for his custody battle over April. Lorelai struggles to write the letter until she and Rory run into Luke and April at the mall and Lorelai suddenly remembers how important Luke has always been in Rory's life. Inspired, Lorelai writes the letter and mails it to Luke's attorney. Rory decides she will write an apology letter to her friend Lucy, explaining why she and Marty kept their past friendship a secret.
143	12	"To Whom It May Concern"	Jamie Babbit	David Babcock	January 30, 2007	2T7762	4.27
Noticing Sookie's recent odd behavior, Lorelai forces Jackson to tell her the reason. Luke and Anna attend a hearing to decide their custody battle over April. With help from Paris, Rory finally makes amends with Lucy, who tells her that she and Marty have broken up. While attending Richard's economics class at Yale, Rory witnesses him keel over in pain. Christopher finds the letter Lorelai wrote for Luke's character reference and confronts Lorelai about whether he was her second choice.
144	13	"I'd Rather Be in Philadelphia"	Lee Shallat-Chemel	Rebecca Rand Kirshner	February 6, 2007	2T7763	4.70
Lorelai and Rory receive unexpected comfort and some grief while at the hospital and at Richard's side: Christopher will not return Lorelai's calls, but Luke is there for her and the family. Emily is so distraught that she tries to distract herself by maintaining her rigorous social calendar with Luke offering to help her out in keeping up her appearances. Rory is met by Logan, who flies by helicopter to the hospital. Christopher finally arrives at the hospital and acts petulantly when he sees Luke and Lorelai chatting in the hospital corridor.
145	14	"Farewell, My Pet"	Jamie Babbit	Jennie Snyder	February 13, 2007	2T7764	4.37
Rory quickly develops a crush on Richard's replacement teaching assistant and feels compelled to confess the attraction to Logan. But he tells her that he completely understands and the two of them reassure each other that in the end they are crazy about each other. Meanwhile, Lorelai distracts herself from thinking about Christopher by arranging a memorial service for Michel's dog. Christopher seeks her out, however, and the two are forced to face the fact that they don’t belong together.
146	15	"I Am Kayak, Hear Me Roar"	Lee Shallat-Chemel	Rebecca Rand Kirshner	February 20, 2007	2T7765	4.05
Lorelai puts off telling her parents about her separation from Christopher by helping Emily arrange Richard's recovery. Liz and TJ descend on Luke, asking to stay with their baby because they have moths. Meanwhile, Richard rails against Emily’s regime of fish for every meal. Rory celebrates Logan's 25th birthday, but bad news from Logan's business partner spoils their evening.
147	16	"Will You Be My Lorelai Gilmore?"	David Paymer	Gina Fattore & Gayle Abrams	February 27, 2007	2T7766	4.17
Rory goes to meet with an editor from the New York Times just as she starts to put together Lane's baby shower. Lorelai takes over the production and has to arbitrate a disagreement between Lane and Mrs. Kim about how to raise the unborn children. Meanwhile, Luke decides to change his situation in life and buy a new boat. Logan comes home drunk and reveals to Rory his failed business venture, and then runs off to Las Vegas with his buddies.
148	17	"Gilmore Girls Only"	Lee Shallat-Chemel	David Babcock	March 6, 2007	2T7767	4.47
Lorelai, Rory, and Emily take a road trip to North Carolina to attend Mia's wedding. Emily reluctantly acknowledges that Mia was a mother figure to Lorelai when she was a teen mother. Lane goes into labor and later she and Zack ask Luke to be godfather to their twins Steve and Kwan.
149	18	"Hay Bale Maze"	Stephen Clancy	Rebecca Rand Kirshner	April 17, 2007	2T7768	3.79
During Stars Hollow's annual Spring Fling festival, a huge hay bale maze leads to a chance encounter for Luke and Lorelai, where they apologize to one another and talk about the problems that led to their engagement being called off. As Rory shows Logan around town, Lorelai begins to feel that Logan might be too irresponsible for her daughter. Meanwhile, Rory has a job interview with the Providence Journal Bulletin.
150	19	"It's Just Like Riding a Bike"	Lee Shallat-Chemel	Jennie Snyder	April 24, 2007	2T7769	3.75
Lorelai heads to Luke's for her first breakfast there in a while and it becomes an awkward experience for them both. Later on, when Lorelai's Jeep breaks down, Luke helps her shop for a new car. They argue and fight, which Lorelai thinks is ultimately a good sign. Jackson stays with Lorelai when his kids have chicken pox, which he has never had. When he accidentally breaks Lorelai’s childhood doll’s house, he and Sookie argue, but they eventually realise that they are tense because he lied to her about not getting a vasectomy, leading to her being pregnant a third time. Paris gets into all six schools that she applied to. Later, she considers breaking up with Doyle so she can be free of influences when it comes to picking which law or medical school she will attend. Rory receives a letter telling her she has not been selected for the James Reston Reporting Fellowship.
151	20	"Lorelai? Lorelai?"	Bethany Rooney	David S. Rosenthal	May 1, 2007	2T7770	4.08
Rory stresses out as graduation approaches, which leads to a day of eating and shopping with Lorelai. After getting into a science camp, April tells Luke that she cannot go on the boating trip with him over the summer. Zach is asked to go on tour with another band. Later, the Gilmores go to Patty and Babette's karaoke night, where Lorelai sings Dolly Parton’s ‘I Will Always Love You’ where she locks eyes with Luke. Logan returns from a business trip and asks Lorelai for Rory’s hand in marriage.
152	21	"Unto the Breach"	Lee Shallat-Chemel	David Babcock & Jennie Snyder	May 8, 2007	2T7771	3.99
Lorelai and Christopher are reunited at a party Emily and Richard throw in honor of Rory's graduation. Logan surprises everyone at the party by proposing to Rory, but she is too shocked to give him an answer. Then, on graduation day, Rory and Paris receive their diplomas, and Rory finally gives Logan her answer and says no. Meanwhile, Lorelai is embarrassed about her recent karaoke serenade to Luke, and Luke is hurt when he overhears her saying it did not mean anything.
153	22	"Bon Voyage"	Lee Shallat-Chemel	David S. Rosenthal	May 15, 2007	2T7772	4.86
Rory gets a job following the presidential campaign of one of the candidates running for president. While she prepares to leave in a mere three days, Lorelai adjusts to the idea that she may not see her daughter again for weeks, even months. Meanwhile, Luke is still trying to sort out how he really feels about Lorelai after they locked eyes at the karaoke jam. To see Rory off before she leaves for her new job, Luke orchestrates a surprise farewell party starting with a secret town meeting, organizing all the planning elements and sewing together coverage for the impending rain storm. The entire town puts on the farewell party acknowledging their adoration of the two Gilmore girls. The next day, Lorelai and Rory have one final stop at Luke's diner before her departure.

== DVD release ==
The Complete Seventh Season
Set details		Special features		
22 episodes; 6-disc set; 1.33:1 aspect ratio; 1.78:1 aspect ratio (international); Subtitles: English; English (Dolby Digital 5 1 Surround)		Additional scene; "The Great Stink"; Gilmore Fashionistas; A Best Friend's Peek Inside the Gilmore Girls with Keiko Agena; Kirk's Town Tours; Who Wants to Talk Boys – Season Montage		
Release dates
North America	United Kingdom	Continental Europe	Norway	Australia
November 13, 2007	August 30, 2010	November 25, 2007	November 14, 2007	April 9, 2008
