= French Twist =

French Twist may refer to:

- French twist (hairstyle), a common "updo" hair styling technique
- French Twist (film), (French: Gazon maudit), a 1995 French comedy film
- "French Twist" (Gilmore Girls), an episode of the seventh season of the television show Gilmore Girls
- "French Twist" (Miami Vice), an episode of the second season of the television show Miami Vice
