= Gilmore Girls season 6 =

Gilmore Girls
- Season 6
- Season 6 DVD cover
- Showrunner: Amy Sherman-Palladino
- Starring: Lauren Graham; Alexis Bledel; Melissa McCarthy; Scott Patterson; Keiko Agena; Yanic Truesdale; Liza Weil; Sean Gunn; Matt Czuchry; Kelly Bishop; Edward Herrmann
- No. of episodes: 22

Release
- Original network: The WB
- Original release: September 13, 2005 – May 9, 2006

Season chronology
- ← Previous; Season 5 Next → Season 7

The sixth season of Gilmore Girls, an American comedy drama television series, began airing on September 13, 2005, on The WB. The season concluded on May 9, 2006, after 22 episodes. The season aired Tuesdays at 8:00 pm. This was the final season to air on The WB, before the network and rival UPN merged to form The CW in September 2006.

On March 22, 2006, The CW announced that the show was renewed for a seventh season.

== Overview ==
The season picks up at the moment the fifth season ended, with Lorelai having just proposed to Luke. Luke accepts but they decide to delay the wedding until after she has reconciled with Rory. During the estrangement, Lorelai buys a dog and names it Paul Anka. Rory is given 300 hours of community service for the boat theft and Emily gets her a job in the office at the Daughters of the American Revolution. However, Rory begins to resent Emily's attempts to control her and after a visit from Jess, in which he argues with Rory about her decision to work for the DAR and her quitting Yale. Rory confronts Logan about her lifestyle and they decide to take a break. Rory then reconciles with Lorelai, moves back home, and returns to school.

Doyle steps down as editor of The Yale Daily News and is replaced by Paris. The couple gets an apartment near the college and Rory moves into their spare room. However, Paris soon alienates the newsroom with her bullying style of leadership and is voted out, and Rory is chosen to replace her. Paris throws Rory out and she moves in with Logan, who Rory reconciles with after reading a letter from Lorelai.

Rory and Logan fight when Rory discovers Logan slept with other women during their break, thinking they were not actually together anymore. Rory later decides to forgive him and they get back together, until Logan realizes Rory still is not over the cheating and decides to do a stunt with the Life and Death Brigade. During this time, Rory visits Jess at his publishing company in Philadelphia and the two share a kiss, but immediately stop and part ways on friendly terms for good once she realizes she is in love with Logan and was just trying to get back at him. Rory and Logan then definitely make amends when he is injured during his Life and Death Brigade stunt and Rory nurses him during his convalescence.

Zach becomes jealous of Lane's friendship with Brian and starts a fight on stage as the band are about to play for a record label. However, Zach manages to bring everyone back together and proposes to Lane. They marry towards the end of the season.

Christopher inherits a large sum of money from his grandfather and offers to do something for Lorelai and Rory. Rory asks him to pay her Yale fees, freeing her from her obligation to Richard and Emily. They are upset by this decision, but a Friday night dinner spent working through their difficulties sees the Gilmores on good terms again.

Michel objects to Luke being used as an unofficial handyman at the inn but this turns out to be because he misses his planning sessions with Lorelai.

Lorelai and Sookie throw themselves into organizing the wedding. Luke learns he has a 12-year-old daughter, April Nardini, when she runs a DNA test for a science fair project. He hides April from Lorelai for two months. Even after Lorelai learns about April, he keeps them apart since he is worried April will like Lorelai better. April's protective mother, Anna, does not want her daughter getting attached to someone who might not be permanently in Luke's life. Luke postpones the wedding while he gets to know April.

In the season finale, Logan graduates from college and Rory throws him a farewell party before Mitchum sends him to London for a year. Lorelai tries to get Luke to elope with her, but he refuses and she calls off the engagement altogether. The season closes with Lorelai waking up to discover she has spent the night with Christopher.

== Cast ==
=== Main cast ===
- Lauren Graham as Lorelai Gilmore, Rory's mother.
- Alexis Bledel as Rory Gilmore, Lorelai's daughter.
- Melissa McCarthy as Sookie St. James, Lorelai's best friend and co-worker.
- Scott Patterson as Luke Danes, Lorelai's fiance and the owner of the local diner.
- Keiko Agena as Lane Kim, Rory's best friend.
- Yanic Truesdale as Michel Gerard, Lorelai and Sookie's co-worker.
- Liza Weil as Paris Geller, Rory's classmate and close friend.
- Sean Gunn as Kirk Gleason, a resident of Stars Hollow who works many jobs.
- Matt Czuchry as Logan Huntzberger, Rory's boyfriend.
- Kelly Bishop as Emily Gilmore, Lorelai's mother and Rory's grandmother.
- Edward Herrmann as Richard Gilmore, Lorelai's father and Rory's grandfather.

=== Recurring cast ===
- Jackson Douglas as Jackson Belleville, Sookie's husband.
- Liz Torres as Miss Patty, the owner of the local dance studio.
- Emily Kuroda as Mrs. Kim, Lane's religious mother.
- Sally Struthers as Babette Dell, Lorelai and Rory's next-door neighbor.
- Ted Rooney as Morey Dell, Lorelai and Rory's next-door neighbor.
- Michael Winters as Taylor Doose, the owner of the local grocery store.
- David Sutcliffe as Christopher Hayden, Rory's father and Lorelai's ex-boyfriend.
- Todd Lowe as Zach Van Gerbig, Lane's fiance, and bandmate.
- John Cabrera as Brian Fuller, Lane's bandmate.
- Sebastian Bach as Gil, Lane's bandmate.
- Danny Strong as Doyle McMaster, Paris's boyfriend.
- Kathleen Wilhoite as Liz Danes, Luke's younger sister.
- Michael DeLuise as TJ, Liz's husband.
- Gregg Henry as Mitchum Huntzberger, Logan's father.
- Sherilyn Fenn as Anna Nardini, Luke's ex-girlfriend and April's mother.
- Vanessa Marano as April Nardini, Luke and Anna's daughter.
- Devon Sorvai as Honor Huntzberger, Logan's younger sister.
- Amy Salon as Sheila, Rory's classmate.
- Devon Michaels as Bill, Rory's classmate.
- Rona Benson as Joni, Rory's classmate.
- Nicolette Collier as Gigi Hayden, Christopher and Sherry's daughter, and Rory's half-sister.
- Tanc Sade as Finn, Logan's friend.
- Alan Loayza as Colin McCrae, Logan's friend.

=== Guest ===
- Melora Hardin as Carolyn Bates, Emily's friend.
- Milo Ventimiglia as Jess Mariano, Liz's son, Luke's nephew, and Rory's ex-boyfriend.

== Episodes ==
No. overall	No. in season	Title	Directed by	Written by	Original release date	Prod. code	US viewers (millions)
110	1	"New and Improved Lorelai"	Amy Sherman-Palladino	Amy Sherman-Palladino	September 13, 2005	2T6301	6.22
Picking up on the same night as last season's finale, Lorelai and Luke begin making plans for their future, but Luke is embarrassed when word spreads that Lorelai was the one who proposed. Still hurt over Rory's decision to drop out of Yale and move in with Emily and Richard, Lorelai tells her parents that they can take care of Rory from now on. Richard hires an old friend and respected attorney to help Rory get an easy sentence for stealing the yacht, but the judge gives Rory 300 hours of community service. Logan throws Rory a "felon" party.
111	2	"Fight Face"	Daniel Palladino	Daniel Palladino	September 20, 2005	2T6302	5.79
Rory begins serving her 300 hours of community service and finds that life on a road crew is not pretty. Lorelai and Luke try to decide whether they will fix up Lorelai's house or buy the Twickham house. Luke's sister Liz begs him to hire her husband, T.J. as a contractor. When Rory pays Luke a surprise visit at the diner to find out how Lorelai is, he feels obligated to tell her that he and Lorelai are engaged. Afterward, Luke confronts Lorelai about her estrangement from Rory. Feeling lonely, Lorelai adopts a dog at the Stars Hollow pet fair and names Paul Anka. Finally, during a chance meeting, Lorelai and Rory have an angry confrontation about their mutual hurt feelings.
112	3	"The UnGraduate"	Michael Zinberg	David S. Rosenthal	September 27, 2005	2T6303	5.45
Excited about catering the wedding, Sookie pressures Lorelai to set a date, but Lorelai will not commit. While completing her community service hours, Rory takes a job at Emily's Daughters of the American Revolution (DAR) office. Convinced that she has a rival for the job of DAR president, Emily uses Rory as her spy. Logan returns from Europe and returns to Yale, forcing Rory to confront her true feelings about dropping out of college. Lane and her band return from their summer tour on the road, feeling successful and hopeful for their future. Luke agrees to take care of Lorelai's dog, Paul Anka, while she works late at the inn, and ends up rushing the dog to the vet when Paul Anka eats chocolate. Lorelai admits to Luke that the reason she has put off seeing a date for the wedding is that Rory would not be there at this stage in their feud.
113	4	"Always a Godmother, Never a God"	Robert Berlinger	Rebecca Rand Kirshner	October 4, 2005	2T6304	5.96
Missing Rory, Lorelai tries to call her and is upset to find that Rory's cell phone is no longer in service. Sookie asks Lorelai and Rory to be the godparents of her two children, hoping that they will reconcile when they see each other at the ceremony. However, mother and daughter fight when Lorelai realizes that Rory gave her new cell number to Sookie but not to her, furthering their split. Logan learns that his father expects him to graduate this year and enter the family business. Wanting to break free from family pressures, Logan whisks Rory off to a weekend in New York.
114	5	"We've Got Magic to Do"	Michael Zinberg	Daniel Palladino	October 11, 2005	2T6305	6.16
Lorelai attends Miss Patty's recital and sends Luke off to the woods to commune with nature, but Luke feels Lorelai has banished him. The two eventually reconcile these differences. Rory's World War II-themed DAR bash is a success (even when suddenly impoverished Paris joins the proletariat as a server). Emily and Richard learn that Lorelai was telling the truth about the Huntzberger family, and confront Shira and Mitchum, respectively.
115	6	"Welcome to the Doll House"	Jackson Douglas	Keith Eisner	October 18, 2005	2T6306	6.08
To boost tourism, Taylor suggests reviving Stars Hollow's original street names. Lorelai thinks that is a charming idea - until she learns that the Dragonfly Inn's address will be on the gross street name "Sores and Boils Alley." She attempts to rectify the situation, but there are unforeseen obstacles. At the same time, mysterious packages begin to arrive for Lorelai. She figures out that it is Emily sending her the items. Emily insists that Lorelai pick up her beloved childhood dollhouse or Emily will donate it the next day. Logan gives Rory an expensive Birkin handbag, making Emily subtly jealous and excited for their relationship. Richard grows more concerned about Rory following his confrontation with Mitchum. Richard delivers the dollhouse to Lorelai as a pretense to talk about Rory.
116	7	"Twenty-One is the Loneliest Number"	Robert Berlinger	Amy Sherman-Palladino	October 25, 2005	2T6307	6.02
Since Rory was little, the Gilmore girls have planned to spend her 21st birthday in Atlantic City, sipping martinis, and playing blackjack. But due to their estrangement Emily plans the birthday party at their home in typical Emily fashion, which Rory grudgingly accepts. Richard and Emily have their pastor over for dinner after Rory drops the news that she and Logan are having sex. In response, Emily moves Rory back into the main house. At the birthday party, Lorelai and Rory finally talk and their tensions ease slightly.
117	8	"Let Me Hear Your Balalaikas Ringing Out"	Kenny Ortega	Daniel Palladino	November 8, 2005	2T6308	5.84
Rory's old flame Jess returns with the exciting news that he has published a book. He criticizes Rory for her choices, specifically dropping out of Yale and joining the DAR. Logan is jealous when he finds Jess and Rory spending time together, and the evening ends in a fight between Logan and Rory about Jess and Rory's mounting frustrations with her current state of affairs. Rory angrily confronts Emily after the latter tries to assert more control over her granddaughter's life. Luke sponsors a girls' soccer team and is concerned about their violent strategies. Lorelai projects her feelings about being a bad mother onto her dog.
118	9	"The Prodigal Daughter Returns"	Amy Sherman-Palladino	Amy Sherman-Palladino	November 15, 2005	2T6309	6.19
Rory returns home. A super smart middle schooler shows up at Luke's Diner with a startling idea for a science fair project. After testing Luke's DNA, she reveals herself to be April, Luke's daughter with an ex-girlfriend, Anna Nardini. Luke, who was previously unaware of April's existence, is blindsided by this revelation.
119	10	"He's Slippin' 'Em Bread...Dig?"	Kenny Ortega	Daniel Palladino	November 22, 2005	2T6310	6.30
Thanksgiving arrives and, after months of emotional turmoil, all is well with the Gilmores –- except for one issue: Luke does not know how to tell Lorelai about his daughter, April. Lane's band plays a showcase, which ends in disaster due to Zach's insecurities. The band falls apart and Lane breaks up with Zach.
120	11	"The Perfect Dress"	Jamie Babbit	Amy Sherman-Palladino	January 10, 2006	2T6311	5.79
The perfect dress: elegant blush-silk tulle, in Lorelai's size and on sale, and it is ideal for a wedding. Lane is short-tempered, belligerent and miserable since she broke up with Zach and moved back home. Luke goes to have a talk with his former girlfriend Anna Nardini, mother of his daughter April.
121	12	"Just Like Gwen and Gavin"	Stephen Clancy	Daniel Palladino	January 17, 2006	2T6312	5.67
Taylor realizes the Winter Carnival can be a success without him. Paris learns the Yale Daily News staff loathes and fears her. Lorelai finds out about Luke's daughter, April, but not from Luke himself. Rory is overwhelmed with all the gifts Logan is sending in an effort to be forgiven.
122	13	"Friday Night's Alright for Fighting"	Kenny Ortega	Amy Sherman-Palladino	January 31, 2006	2T6313	5.22
While Luke deals with the reality of having April in his life, Lorelai tries to pretend she does not mind the repercussions the new situation is having on their engagement. Rory's concern over Paris' lack of management skills at the Yale Daily News finally reaches a crisis point when most of the staff quits in protest. With Logan's help, Rory gets the paper out on time: the occasion gives them the chance to finally get closer again. Meanwhile, Lorelai tells Richard and Emily that their money will no longer be needed for Rory's education, and the resentment starts to build. The subsequent Friday night dinner erupts into an emotional confrontation where all four Gilmores finally voice their issues.
123	14	"You've Been Gilmored"	Stephen Clancy	Jordon Nardino	February 7, 2006	2T6314	5.40
Lorelai's parents insist that Luke come to Friday night dinner, and she says yes without asking him. Paris is ousted as the "Yale Daily News" editor, and the staff elects Rory as the new editor. In retaliation, Paris kicks Rory out of her apartment, so Rory moves in with Logan. In other events, Michel confides in Lorelai. Rory gives her father a tour of Yale, where he is disturbed to find Rory living with Logan, but ends up growing to like him.
124	15	"A Vineyard Valentine"	Daniel Palladino	Daniel Palladino	February 14, 2006	2T6316	5.34
Rory and Logan ask Lorelai and Luke to celebrate Valentine's Day with them on a weekend at the Huntzberger's house on Martha's Vineyard, where Lorelai is annoyed by Luke's disdain for Logan. At the end of the weekend, Logan and his father have a confrontation about his lack of responsibility.
125	16	"Bridesmaids Revisited"	Linda Mendoza	Rebecca Rand Kirshner	February 28, 2006	2T6315	5.01
Lorelai and Christopher attend a journalism panel at Yale where Rory dazzles the crowd. Afterward, Lorelai offers to help Christopher by babysitting his daughter and is horrified by the toddler's terrible behavior, leading to a fight between them. The next day, Rory and Logan attend the wedding of Logan's sister, Honor. While helping the bridesmaids get ready, Rory is devastated to learn that Logan had sex with two of Honor's friends while they were broken up. Finally, Lane is still heartbroken over Zach, until he turns up at the diner with a surprise.
126	17	"I'm OK, You're OK"	Lee Shallat-Chemel	Keith Eisner	April 4, 2006	2T6317	4.47
Rory forgives Logan for his indiscretions, then needs some time for herself, so she visits Lorelai in Stars Hollow. Although Lorelai refuses to admit that she is upset, Rory can tell that she is bothered by the news that Luke will be gone for a few days on a field trip with his daughter, April. Against Lorelai's wishes, Rory pays a visit to the store owned by April's mother to spy on her. Meanwhile, when Zack finally works up the courage to ask Mrs. Kim for permission to marry Lane, he is surprised at the deal she makes with him.
127	18	"The Real Paul Anka"	Daniel Palladino	Daniel Palladino	April 11, 2006	2T6318	4.13
Although Rory and Logan are back together, Logan is miserable knowing that Rory has not really forgiven him, and he takes off with his friends for another stunt with the Life and Death Brigade. Rory accepts Jess's invitation to attend an open house at his new book store/art gallery/publishing house in Philadelphia. While there, she is surprised to run into Luke, who is accompanying his daughter April on an academic field trip. Back in Stars Hollow, Lorelai is horrified to find that Richard and Emily have been looking at real estate in her town. (Last appearance of Milo Ventimiglia.)
128	19	"I Get a Sidekick Out of You"	Amy Sherman-Palladino	Amy Sherman-Palladino	April 18, 2006	2T6319	4.31
Lane and Zach are getting married and they have two ceremonies: a Korean wedding for Mrs. Kim's strictly Buddhist mother, and a Christian wedding at the Stars Hollow church. Afterwards, Lane and Zach hold their wedding reception in the town square. Lorelai fears she and Luke will never tie the knot, and so she gets drunk and gives an embarrassing toast.
129	20	"Super Cool Party People"	Ken Whittingham	David S. Rosenthal	April 25, 2006	2T6320	4.98
Luke decides to give April a birthday party at the diner. Lorelai volunteers to help and becomes hurt when Luke explains that he still thinks it is too soon for them to meet. However, Luke changes his mind when the party is a disaster, giving Lorelai a chance to bond with April. Meanwhile, Rory rushes to be with Logan at the hospital after he is seriously injured during a stunt with the Life and Death Brigade.
130	21	"Driving Miss Gilmore"	Jamie Babbit	Daniel Palladino & Amy Sherman-Palladino	May 2, 2006	2T6321	5.12
Rory is strict in keeping Logan on bed rest following his release from the hospital, enlisting the help of Paris and Doyle to assure that he does not strain himself. She finds herself distracted, however, upon discovering that Mitchum spoke of her in an interview with the Wall Street Journal. Meanwhile, Emily suffers temporary blindness after botched eye surgery and asks Lorelai's help in running errands after firing all of her hired help. While spending time with Emily, Lorelai learns her parents want to buy her and Luke a marital home, so she confesses that the wedding is not going to happen. Elsewhere, Liz announces her pregnancy to Luke and reveals that there is trouble between her and TJ.
131	22	"Partings"	Amy Sherman-Palladino	Daniel Palladino & Amy Sherman-Palladino	May 9, 2006	2T6322	5.33
The town troubadour departs Stars Hollow for his Neil Young gig, creating a stampede of would-be troubadours to town, including the bands Sparks, Sonic Youth, and Yo La Tengo. Logan graduates and leaves for London. Emily and Richard try to set Christopher up with Carolyn Bates (Melora Hardin). The Lorelai-Luke love affair may be over.

== DVD release ==
The Complete Sixth Season
Set details		Special features		
22 episodes; 6-disc set; 1.33:1 aspect ratio; 1.78:1 aspect ratio (international); Subtitles: Spanish and French; English (Dolby Digital 2 0 Surround)		None		
Release dates
North America	United Kingdom	Continental Europe	Norway	Australia
September 19, 2006	April 19, 2010	January 10, 2007	May 25, 2007	February 6, 2007
