= List of Gilmore Girls characters =

This is an extensive list of all the characters in the comedy-drama television series Gilmore Girls.

The season three cast—(Back row): Lane, Michel, Paris, Emily, Richard, Sookie, Miss Patty, Kirk; Front row: Jess, Luke, Lorelai, Rory, Dean

== Cast ==
List indicator

This section includes characters who will appear or have appeared in at least one season of the series.

- A green cell indicates the actor is a main cast member.
- A yellow cell indicates the actor is a featured cast member.
- A red cell indicates the actor is a recurring cast member.
- A light blue cell indicates the actor is a guest or special guest cast member.

=== Starring ===
Actor	Character	Appearances							
Actor	Character	Season 1	Season 2	Season 3	Season 4	Season 5	Season 6	Season 7	A Year in the Life
Lauren Graham	Lorelai Gilmore	Main	Main	Main	Main	Main	Main	Main	Main
Alexis Bledel	Rory Gilmore	Main	Main	Main	Main	Main	Main	Main	Main
Melissa McCarthy	Sookie St. James	Main	Main	Main	Main	Main	Main	Main	Guest
Keiko Agena	Lane Kim	Main	Main	Main	Main	Main	Main	Main	Recurring
Yanic Truesdale	Michel Gerard	Main	Main	Main	Main	Main	Main	Main	Recurring
Scott Patterson	Luke Danes	Main	Main	Main	Main	Main	Main	Main	Main
Kelly Bishop	Emily Gilmore	Main	Main	Main	Main	Main	Main	Main	Main
Edward Herrmann	Richard Gilmore	Main (Note: Edward Herrman is credited as "Special Appearance By".)	Main	Main	Main	Main	Main	Main	Deceased (Note: Edward Herrman died on 31 December 2014, His character's death was therefore written into the story of Year in the Life. This included a scene of his funeral and Emily coming to terms with becoming a widow.)
Liza Weil	Paris Geller	Recurring	Main (Note: In season 2-3, Liza Weil is only credited in the episodes she appears.)	Main	Main	Main	Main	Main	Recurring
Jared Padalecki	Dean Forester	Recurring	Main (Note: Jared Padalecki is only credited in the episodes he appears.)	Main	Recurring (Note: Credited as "Special Guest Star")	Recurring			Guest
Milo Ventimiglia	Jess Mariano		Main (Note: Milo Ventimiglia is only credited in the episodes he appears.)	Main	Recurring (Note: Credited as "Special Guest Star")		Special Guest		Recurring
Sean Gunn	Kirk Gleason (Note: In the second episode of season 1, "The Lorelais' First Day At Chilton", Gunn played a character named "Mick", who worked as a DSL installer. In the third episode, he played an unnamed character delivering swans at a wedding. He was then given the recurring role of Kirk.)	Recurring	Recurring	Main	Main	Main	Main	Main	Recurring
Chris Eigeman	Jason Stiles				Main (Note: Chris Eigeman is only credited in the episodes he appears.)				Guest
Matt Czuchry	Logan Huntzberger					Recurring	Main	Main	Recurring

=== Recurring characters ===
Actor	Character	Appearances							
Actor	Character	Season 1	Season 2	Season 3	Season 4	Season 5	Season 6	Season 7	A Year in the Life
Liz Torres	Miss Patty	Recurring	Recurring	Recurring	Recurring	Recurring	Recurring	Recurring	Recurring
Emily Kuroda	Mrs. Kim	Recurring	Recurring	Recurring	Recurring	Recurring	Recurring	Recurring	Recurring
Sally Struthers	Babette Dell	Recurring	Recurring	Recurring	Recurring	Recurring	Recurring	Recurring	Recurring
Jackson Douglas	Jackson Belleville	Recurring	Recurring	Recurring	Recurring	Recurring	Recurring	Recurring	Guest
Michael Winters	Taylor Doose	Recurring	Recurring	Recurring	Recurring	Recurring	Recurring	Recurring	Recurring
David Sutcliffe	Christopher Hayden	Recurring	Recurring	Recurring		Recurring	Recurring	Recurring	Guest
Ted Rooney	Morey Dell	Recurring	Recurring	Recurring	Guest	Guest	Guest	Recurring	Guest
Shelly Cole	Madeline Lynn	Recurring	Recurring	Recurring	Guest				
Teal Redmann	Louise Grant	Recurring	Recurring	Recurring	Guest				
Scott Cohen	Max Medina	Recurring	Recurring	Recurring					
Chad Michael Murray	Tristin Dugray	Recurring	Guest						
Dakin Matthews	Hanlin Charleston	Recurring	Recurring	Recurring	Recurring			Guest	Guest
Marion Ross	Lorelai "Trix" Gilmore	Recurring	Recurring	Recurring	Recurring				
Marion Ross	Cousin Marilyn Gilmore				Guest	Guest			
Lisa Ann Hadley	Rachel	Recurring							
Alex Borstein (Note: Alex Borstein also played Sookie in the original un-aired pilot".)	Drella	Recurring							Guest
Alex Borstein	Miss Celine			Guest		Guest			Guest
Rose Abdoo	Gypsy		Recurring	Recurring	Recurring	Recurring	Recurring	Recurring	Recurring
Carole King	Sophie Bloom		Recurring			Recurring	Recurring		Guest
Biff Yeager	Tom		Recurring	Recurring	Recurring		Recurring		
Emily Bergl	Francie Jarvis		Recurring	Recurring					Guest
Todd Lowe	Zach Van Gerbig			Recurring	Recurring	Recurring	Recurring	Recurring	Recurring
John Cabrera	Brian Fuller			Recurring	Recurring	Recurring	Recurring	Recurring	Recurring
Tricia O'Kelley	Nicole Leahy			Recurring	Recurring				
Arielle Kebbel	Lindsay Lister			Recurring	Recurring	Recurring			
Adam Brody	Dave Rygalski			Recurring					
Sebastian Bach	Gil				Recurring	Recurring	Recurring	Recurring	Recurring
Danny Strong	Doyle McMaster				Recurring	Recurring	Recurring	Recurring	Guest
Kathleen Wilhoite	Liz Danes				Recurring	Recurring	Recurring	Recurring	Guest
Michael DeLuise	TJ				Recurring	Recurring	Recurring	Recurring	
Wayne Wilcox	Marty				Recurring	Recurring		Recurring	
Rini Bell	Lulu Kuschner				Recurring	Recurring	Recurring	Recurring	Guest
Alan Loayza	Colin McCrae					Recurring	Recurring		Guest
Tanc Sade	Finn Morgan					Recurring	Recurring		Guest
Gregg Henry	Mitchum Huntzberger					Recurring	Recurring	Recurring	Guest
Vanessa Marano	April Nardini						Recurring	Recurring	Guest
Sherilynn Fenn	Sasha			Guest					
Sherilynn Fenn	Anna Nardini						Recurring	Recurring	
Krysten Ritter	Lucy							Recurring	
Michelle Ongkingco	Olivia Marquont							Recurring	

=== Notable guest appearances ===
Actor	Character	Appearances							
Actor	Character	Season 1	Season 2	Season 3	Season 4	Season 5	Season 6	Season 7	A Year in the Life
Madeleine Albright	Herself						Guest (Note: Appeared in episode 6.7 in place of Lorelai in Rory's dream. She was the sitting United States Secretary of State at the time.)		
Christiane Amanpour	Herself							Guest (Note: Appeared as a guest at the Dragonfly Inn in the original series finale.)	
Paul Anka	Himself						Guest		
The Bangles	Themselves	Guest							
Barbara Boxer	Herself			Guest (Note: Appeared as the Junior Senator from California at a leadership conference Rory attended with Paris)					
Jon Hamm	Peyton Sanders			Guest					
Riki Lindhome	Girl #2			Guest (Note: One of the girls at Stars Hallow High School who questioned Lorelai about her pregnancy.)					
Riki Lindhome	Juliet					Guest (Note: One of Life and Death Brigade girls.)	Guest		
Jane Lynch	Hospital Nurse	Guest							
Norman Mailer	Himself					Guest			
Seth MacFarlane	Zach		Guest (Note: Grumpy graduate at Lorelai's graduation.)						
Seth MacFarlane	Bob			Guest (Note: Emily's Lawyer.)					
Nick Offerman	Beau Belleville				Guest		Guest		

== Main characters ==
=== Lorelai Gilmore ===
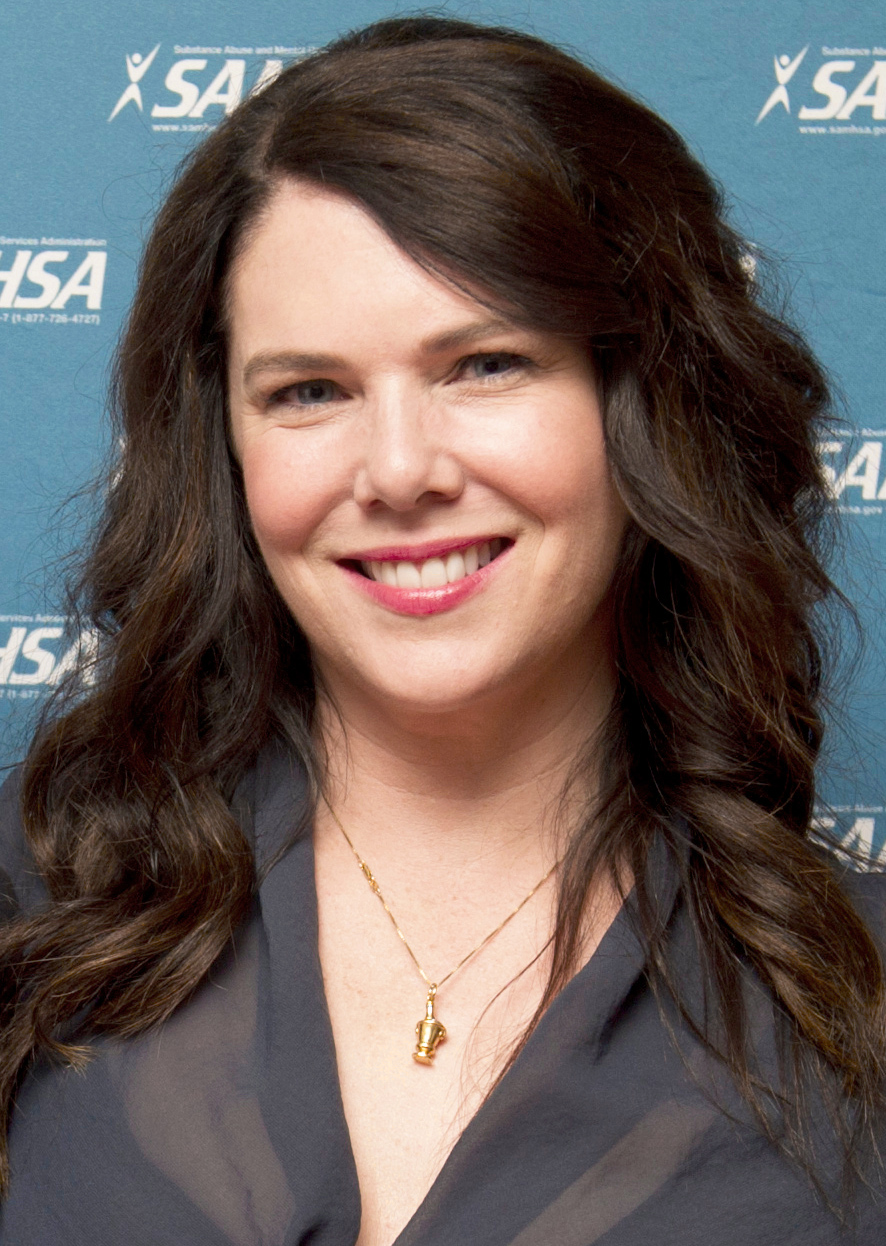
Lauren Graham

Lorelai Gilmore, portrayed by Lauren Graham, is the only daughter of Richard and Emily Gilmore and the doting mother of Rory Gilmore. At 16, Lorelai became pregnant and consequently chose not to marry Rory's father, Christopher, but instead fled to Stars Hollow, where she worked at the Independence Inn under Mia's guidance. Over time, Lorelai rose to the position of executive manager at the inn. When Rory got into Chilton Prep, Lorelai reconciled with her parents for financial support, leading to regular Friday dinners. Eventually, Lorelai and her friend Sookie bought the Dragonfly Inn, fulfilling a dream despite financial hurdles.

Known for her wit, love of pop culture, and indulgence in coffee and shopping, Lorelai's romantic journey with Luke Danes spans the series. They face interference from Lorelai's parents and exes, leading to breakups and makeups. In the show's revival, after Richard's death, Lorelai seeks self-discovery by briefly venturing on a trek inspired by Cheryl Strayed's book, "Wild: From Lost to Found on the Pacific Crest Trail." On her trip, Lorelai decides to reconcile with Emily after several years of tension and returns to propose to Luke, culminating in their marriage on November 5, 2016, marking a significant milestone in their enduring relationship.

=== Rory Gilmore ===
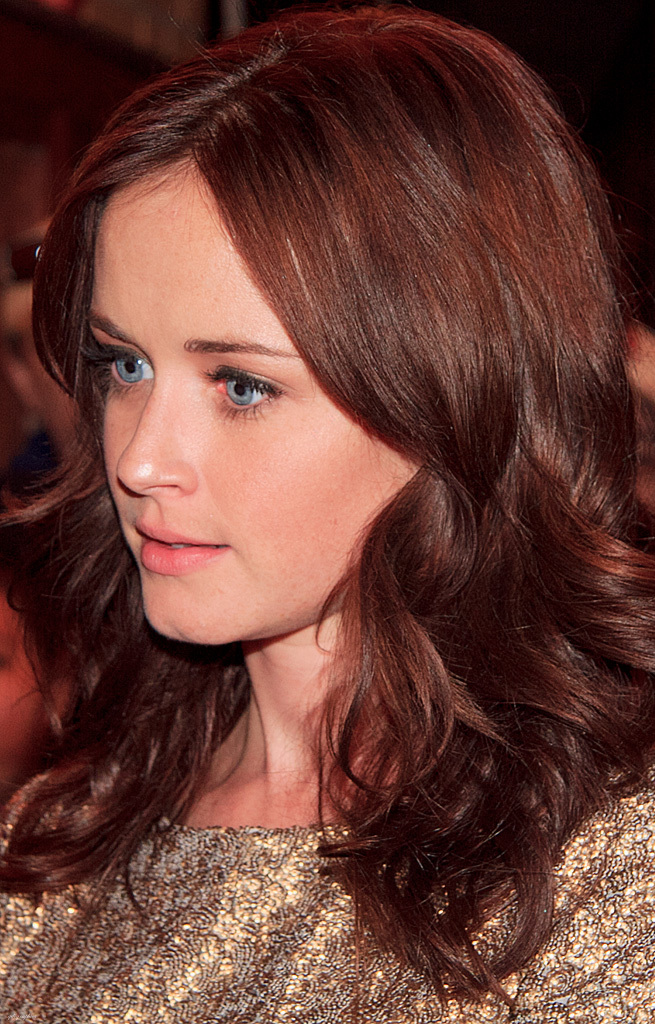
Alexis Bledel

Rory Gilmore, portrayed by Alexis Bledel, is the only child of Lorelai Gilmore and Christopher Hayden, born on October 8, 1984. Known for her close bond with her mother Lorelai, they share similar tastes and witty dialogue, residing in Stars Hollow throughout the show. Rory's dream of attending Harvard leads her to Chilton Academy, where she forges relationships with her grandparents and faces academic rivalries, notably with Paris Geller.

After graduating as valedictorian from Chilton, Rory chooses Yale over Harvard, majoring in English and pursuing journalism. Her romantic journey includes relationships with Dean Forester, Jess Mariano, and Logan Huntzberger, each bringing their own challenges. Rory experiences setbacks in her career, taking a break from Yale and facing a strained relationship with Lorelai but eventually reconciles and returns to Yale to finish her studies.

The series concludes with Rory embracing a journalism opportunity covering Barack Obama's campaign. In the revival, Rory navigates personal and professional struggles, leading her to write a Gilmore family history despite initial conflicts with Lorelai. The series ends on a cliffhanger as Rory reveals her pregnancy to Lorelai, leaving the future open-ended.

=== Sookie St. James ===
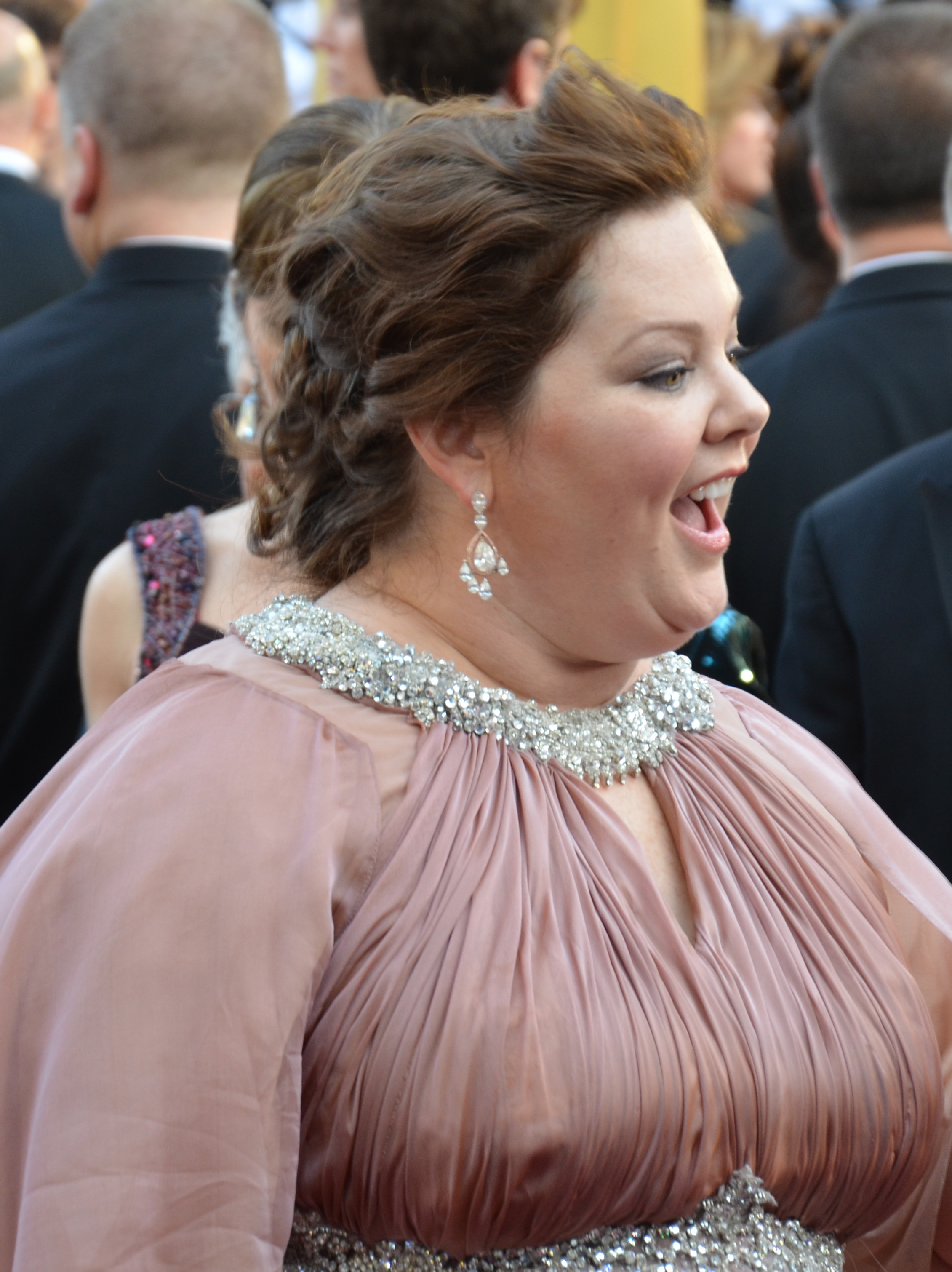
Melissa McCarthy

Sookie St. James, portrayed by Melissa McCarthy, is Lorelai Gilmore's devoted best friend and the talented executive chef at the Independence Inn turned co-owner and head chef at the Dragonfly Inn. Throughout the series, Sookie is Lorelai's supportive business partner and advocate for her romantic relationship with Luke. She also has a strained relationship with Michel, the hotel's front desk clerk.

Sookie marries Jackson Belleville, a quirky vegetable farmer, and they have two children together. Sookie is pregnant with their third child at the conclusion of season seven. In the series revival, Sookie temporarily leaves the inn to explore her culinary skills but returns for Luke and Lorelai's wedding. Alex Borstein was originally cast as Sookie, but had to drop out due to scheduling conflicts and took on other roles in the show.

At the 2015 ATX Television Festival, show creator Amy Sherman-Palladino stated that she had initially intended for Sookie to be gay. She told the Huffington Post, "Things were different back then. The networks were very different in how permissive they would allow you to be. So, Sookie was originally supposed to be gay, but that was a non-starter at that time.."

=== Lane Kim ===
Lane Hyun-kyung Kim, portrayed by Keiko Agena, is Rory Gilmore's devoted best friend, born and raised in Stars Hollow to strict Christian/Korean/Vegan parents, notably her unseen father Mr. Kim. Lane conceals her rock-and-roll passion and non-Christian interests from her family, stashing her collection in hidden spots due to her mother's disapproval. Throughout the series, Lane navigates a complex relationship with her parents, showcasing her independence and desire for a more mainstream life.

Lane attends Stars Hollow High with Rory before Rory transfers to Chilton Academy, where Lane embraces her love for music as an audiophile and joins a band with Dave Rygalski (Adam Brody), Brian Fuller (John Cabrera), and Zack Van Gerbig (Todd Lowe). Her romantic relationships and struggles with her mother's control are central themes, leading to Lane's marriage to Zack and becoming a mother of twins. In the revival, Lane manages Kim's Antiques, lives with her family, and continues her journey of self-discovery and balancing familial expectations with personal happiness, reflecting real-life inspirations from Amy Sherman-Palladino's friendship with Helen Pai.

=== Michel Gerard ===
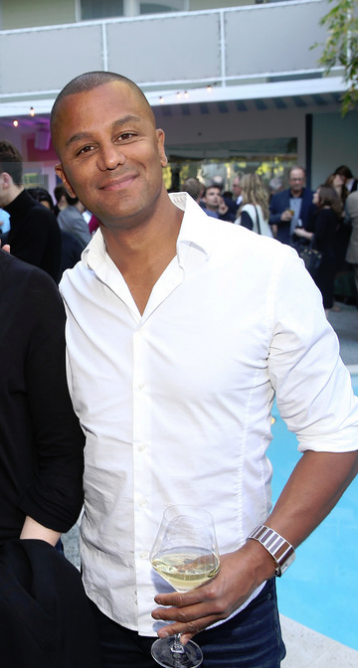
Yanic Truesdale

Michel Gerard, portrayed by Yanic Truesdale, is a French concierge known for his strict diet and keen sense of style at the Independence Inn alongside Lorelai and Sookie. Despite occasional rudeness and impatience, especially with rude guests, Lorelai and Sookie value his expertise and reassure him during their transition to the Dragonfly Inn. Michel shows little interest in children but adores his Chow Chow dogs, Paw-paw and Chin-chin, whom he cares for deeply.

Throughout the series, Michel's quirks include an obsession with Destiny's Child, a strict diet limited to 12 blueberries per day, and a love for Celine Dion's music. Despite his initial standoffishness, Michel gradually warms up to Lorelai, Sookie, Rory, and the Stars Hollow community, displaying a more friendly demeanor over time. In the revival, Michel is revealed to have married his husband and contemplates leaving the inn before Lorelai's expansion plans take shape, hinting at new personal and professional directions in his life.

=== Luke Danes ===
Luke Danes, portrayed by Scott Patterson, is the owner of Luke's Diner in Stars Hollow, Connecticut, having converted his family's hardware store into the diner after his father's death. Luke is known for his dependable and hard-working nature, rooted in traditional values and a close bond with his late father. Despite his serious nature, Luke softens over time, especially in his relationships with friends like Lorelai and Rory, whom he deeply cares for despite occasional disagreements, such as their junk-food habits and differing opinions on certain issues like history and the environment.

Throughout the series, Luke navigates various personal challenges, including his romantic feelings for Lorelai, which are complicated by other relationships in their lives. His romance with Rachel (Lisa Ann Hadley) ends due to his growing affection for Lorelai, and his marriage to Nicole Leahy (Tricia O'Kelly) is short-lived, marked by conflicts partly stemming from Lorelai. Luke's relationship with his nephew Jess Mariano (Milo Ventimiglia) also evolves, marked by communication struggles and eventual reconciliation, showcasing Luke's growth as a caregiver and mentor. Despite ups and downs, Luke and Lorelai's bond endures, culminating in their engagement and plans for marriage after years of shared experiences and challenges, including a period of estrangement over a secret daughter, April Nardini (Vanessa Marano), whose integration into Luke's life impacts their relationship but ultimately strengthens their family ties.

In the series' revival, Luke and Lorelai continue their committed relationship, deciding to marry after significant personal reflections and life events, highlighting their enduring love and journey towards a shared future. Their story underscores themes of family, resilience, and the enduring power of love amidst life's complexities.

=== Emily Gilmore ===
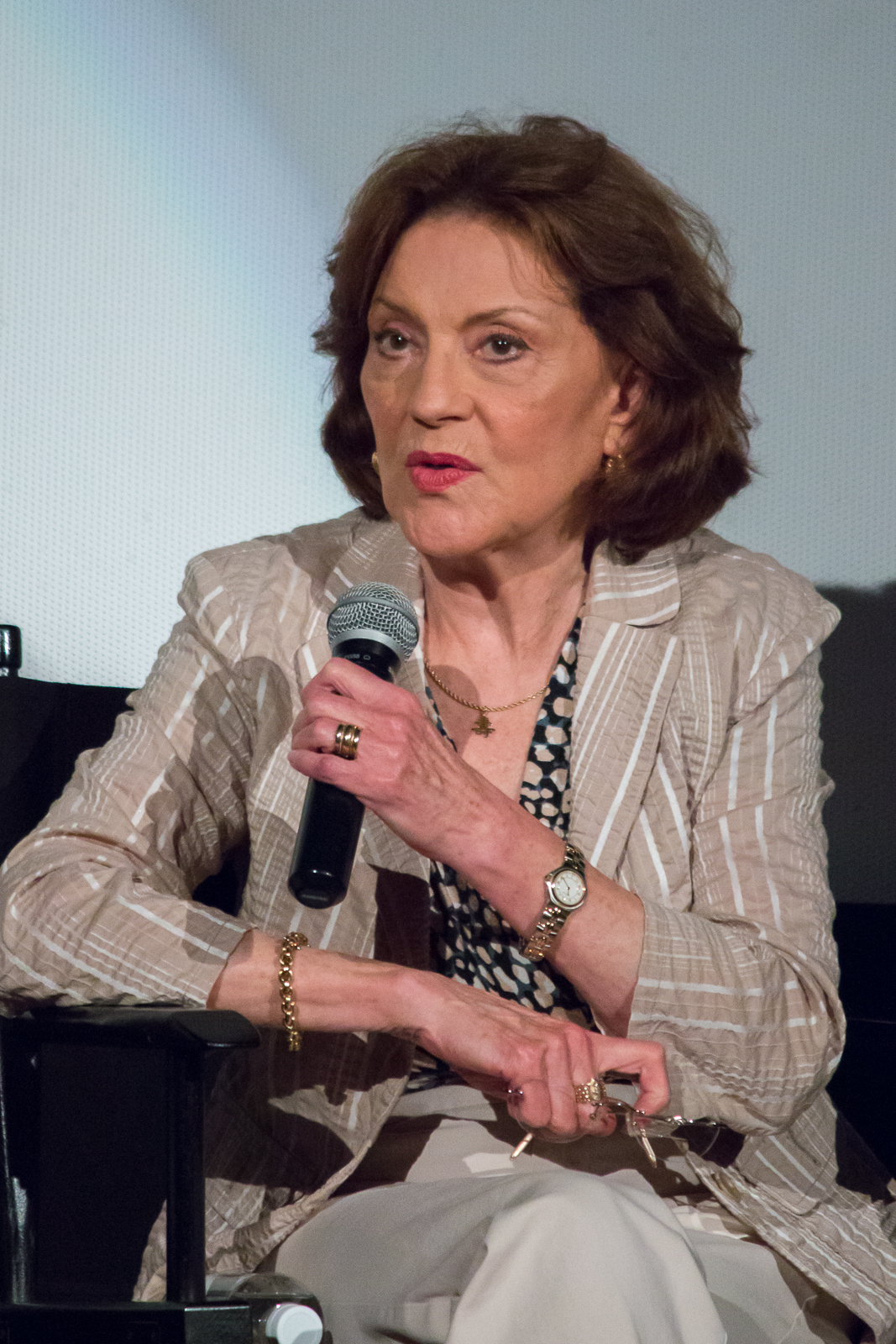
Kelly Bishop

Emily Gilmore, portrayed by Kelly Bishop, is Lorelai's mother and Rory's grandmother. Their relationship has been strained, especially concerning Rory's father, Christopher Hayden (David Sutcliffe). Emily encouraged their connection despite Christopher's shortcomings. However, she adores Rory and financially supported her education at Chilton Preparatory School and Yale University. Emily's upbringing in high society shaped her strict demeanor, dedication to her husband Richard's career, and involvement in various social committees and organizations, notably the Daughters of the American Revolution.

The series delves into Emily and Richard's marital challenges, including Richard's secretive meetings with his ex-girlfriend, causing temporary separation. Emily's attempt at dating reaffirms her love for Richard, leading to their reconciliation and vow renewal. The narrative also explores conflicts with Rory, especially when she moves out due to feeling controlled. Despite relational stress, Emily, Lorelai, and Rory eventually mend their relationships, symbolized by their continued Friday night dinners even after Rory's financial independence. In the revival, Emily copes with Richard's passing, undergoes therapy with Lorelai, and ultimately embraces a new life in Nantucket after selling the family home, keeping Richard's memory close.

=== Richard Gilmore ===
Richard Gilmore, portrayed by Edward Herrmann (1943–2014), is Lorelai's father and Rory's grandfather in the series. He shares a more relaxed bond with Lorelai compared to his wife, Emily. Richard's Yale background and influence play a crucial role in encouraging Rory and Lorelai to consider applying to the university, ultimately helping Rory gain admission there.

Throughout the series, Richard forms a close relationship with Rory, easing tensions during Friday Night Dinners with Emily and Lorelai. His conventional marriage with Emily contrasts Lorelai's more casual lifestyle, although he and Emily do briefly separate in season 4 before reconciling in season 5. Professionally, Richard navigates shifts in his career, from a top-level executive to a business owner with Jason Stiles (Chris Eigeman), and later returning to Yale as an economics instructor in season 7, despite suffering a heart attack during a lecture.

Richard's passing before the series revival deeply impacts Lorelai and Emily, with his funeral serving as a significant narrative point in the miniseries. Rory's act of writing the family history at Richard's desk reflects the enduring legacy and influence he had on the Gilmore family.

=== Paris Geller ===
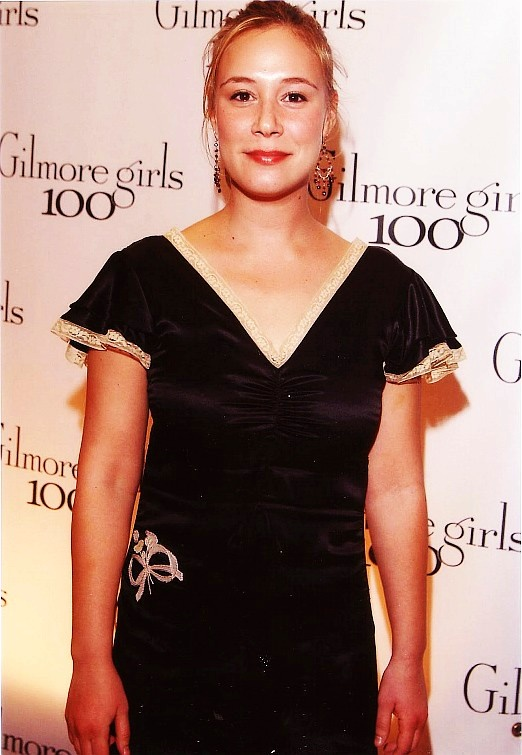
Liza Weil

Paris Geller, portrayed by Liza Weil, enters Gilmore Girls in season 1, episode 2, and concludes her appearances in season 7. Raised by wealthy Jewish parents and primarily by her Portuguese nanny, Paris initially feels threatened by Rory's academic success, especially when their mutual crush Tristin Dogray (Chad Michael Murray) shows interest in Rory. Despite her initial hostility, Paris bonds with Rory over time, sharing dreams of Harvard but ending up at Yale after Paris is rejected by Harvard.

Throughout the series, Paris navigates relationships and academic challenges, including a romance with Jamie (Brandon Barash), an affair with Yale professor Asher Fleming (Michael York), and eventually settling with Yale Daily News editor Doyle McMaster (Danny Strong). Financial struggles arise when her parents flee due to tax evasion, leaving Paris reliant on loans. She attends Yale alongside Rory, showcasing a Type A personality and continual anxiety about meeting expectations. In the revival, Paris runs a successful fertility clinic, is separated from Doyle, and reveals hidden talents like passing the bar exam and having a law practice license.

Paris character, initially planned for a short arc, expanded due to Weil's portrayal, highlighting the pressures of elite academia at Chilton and later Yale. Weil's transformation for the role, including dying her hair blonde, accentuates Paris's contrast with Rory, making her a vital foil throughout the series' progression.

=== Dean Forester ===
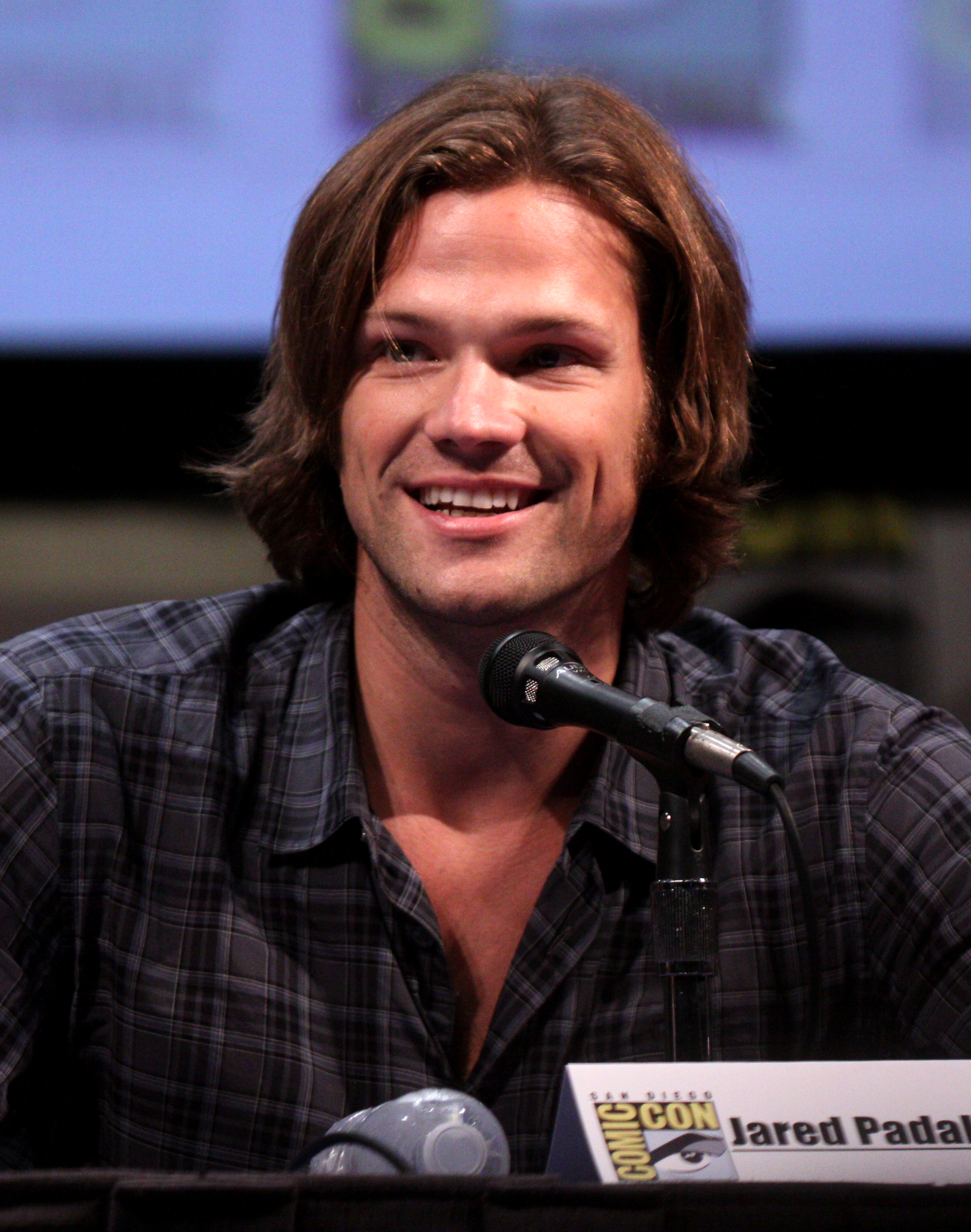
Jared Padalecki

Dean Forester, portrayed by Jared Padalecki, was a prominent character in seasons 2 and 3 of the show, transitioning from a recurring guest star in seasons 1, 4, and 5. Introduced in "Pilot" as the new kid who just moved to Stars Hallow from Chicago and he becomes Rory Gilmore's first boyfriend not long after. Described as the "perfect" first boyfriend, Dean is characterized by his caring and hardworking nature. They date for most of Rory's sophomore and junior year, but eventually face trouble with the arrival of Jess Mariano (Milo Ventimiglia), leading to its eventual end due to jealousy and strain.

Dean later marries Lindsay Lister (Arielle Kebbel), a fellow student from Star Hallow High, but maintains strong feelings for Rory, resulting in an affair before ending his marriage with Lindsay. Complications arise when Lorelai discovers the affair, causing temporary tension. Despite uncertainties about their future, Dean and Rory attempt to rekindle their romance, but differing life paths and circumstances lead to their final breakup.

In later episodes and the 2016 miniseries revival, Dean is reveled to be living in Scranton, PA, married to a woman named Jenny, and has 3 kids (with one more on the way). Dean's interactions with Rory reflect a mature acknowledgment of their past and the paths their lives have taken, ultimately parting on amicable terms as they both move forward with their separate lives.

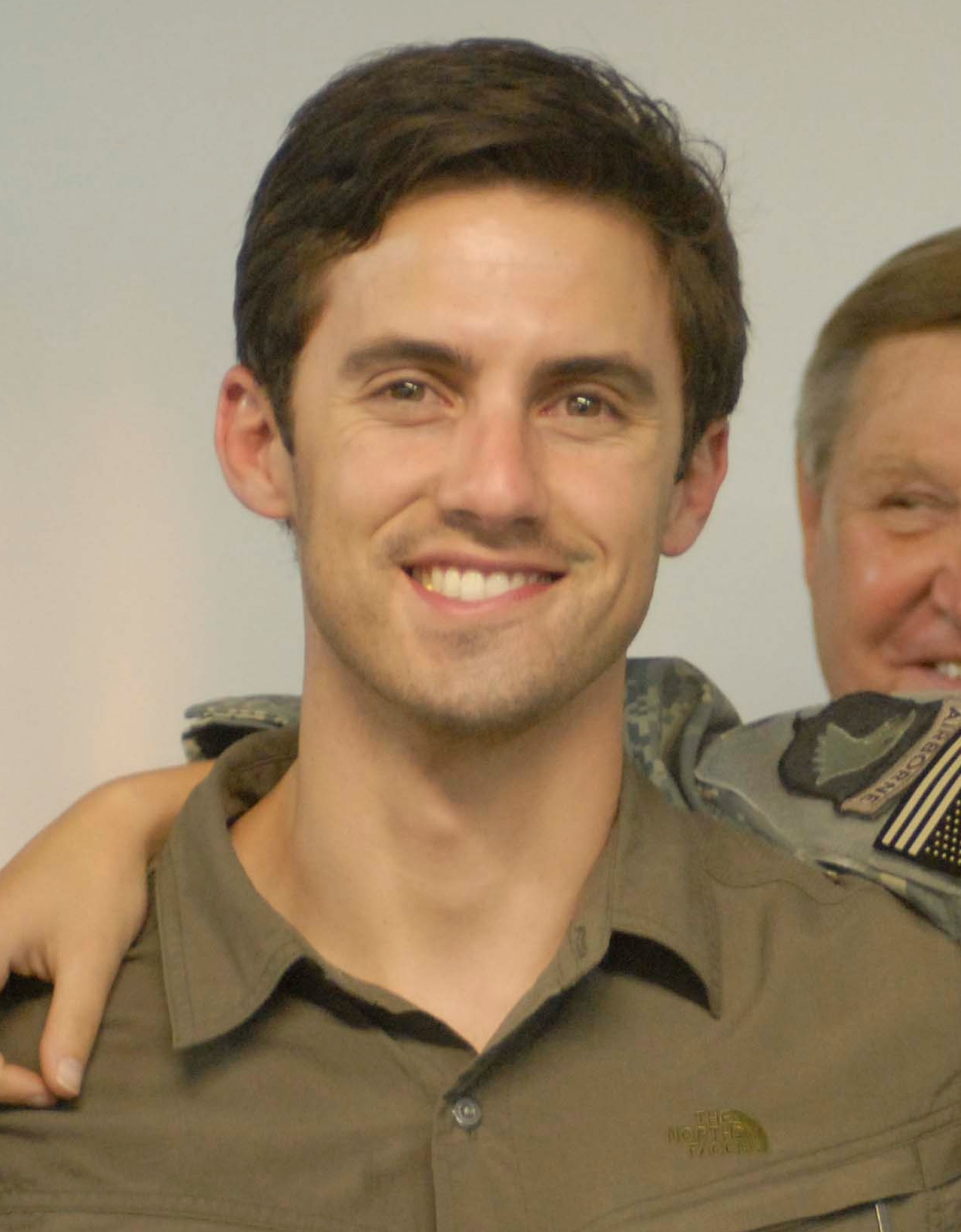
Milo Ventimiglia

=== Jess Mariano ===
Jess Mariano, portrayed by Milo Ventimiglia, was a main character on season 2 and 3 and Rory's second boyfriend. Initially introduced in season 2, Jess arrives in Stars Hollow from New York to live with his uncle Luke due to behavioral issues and conflicts with his mother, Liz (Kathleen Wilhoite). Jess is described as a "bad boy" with his most prominent characteristics being his rebellious and troublemaking ways. Despite his troubled demeanor, Jess is very intelligent and shares intellectual interests with Rory Gilmore, leading to a friendship that evolves into a whirlwind romantic relationship later on. His love life intertwines with Rory's throughout the series, marked by jealousy, miscommunication, and personal growth.

Jess's storyline also delves into his strained relationship with Luke, moments of personal failure such as dropping out of school and struggling with work, and his eventual departure to Venice Beach to live with his estranged father Jimmy Mariano (later played by Rob Estes). Despite attempts to reconcile with Rory and prove his maturity, their relationship faces challenges, especially with Rory's evolving feelings for other men.

In later seasons and the 2016 revival, Jess returns to Stars Hollow having wrote his own novel and co-founding a publishing company in Philadelphia, PA, showing personal growth, offering support to Luke and Rory, and hinting at unresolved feelings for Rory, adding depth to his character's journey.

Jess had a brief spinoff called Windward Circle which was previewed in the Season 3 backdoor pilot episode, "Here Comes The Son". The pilot wasn't green lit in the end but continues to be a point of speculation for fans of the show.

=== Kirk Gleason ===
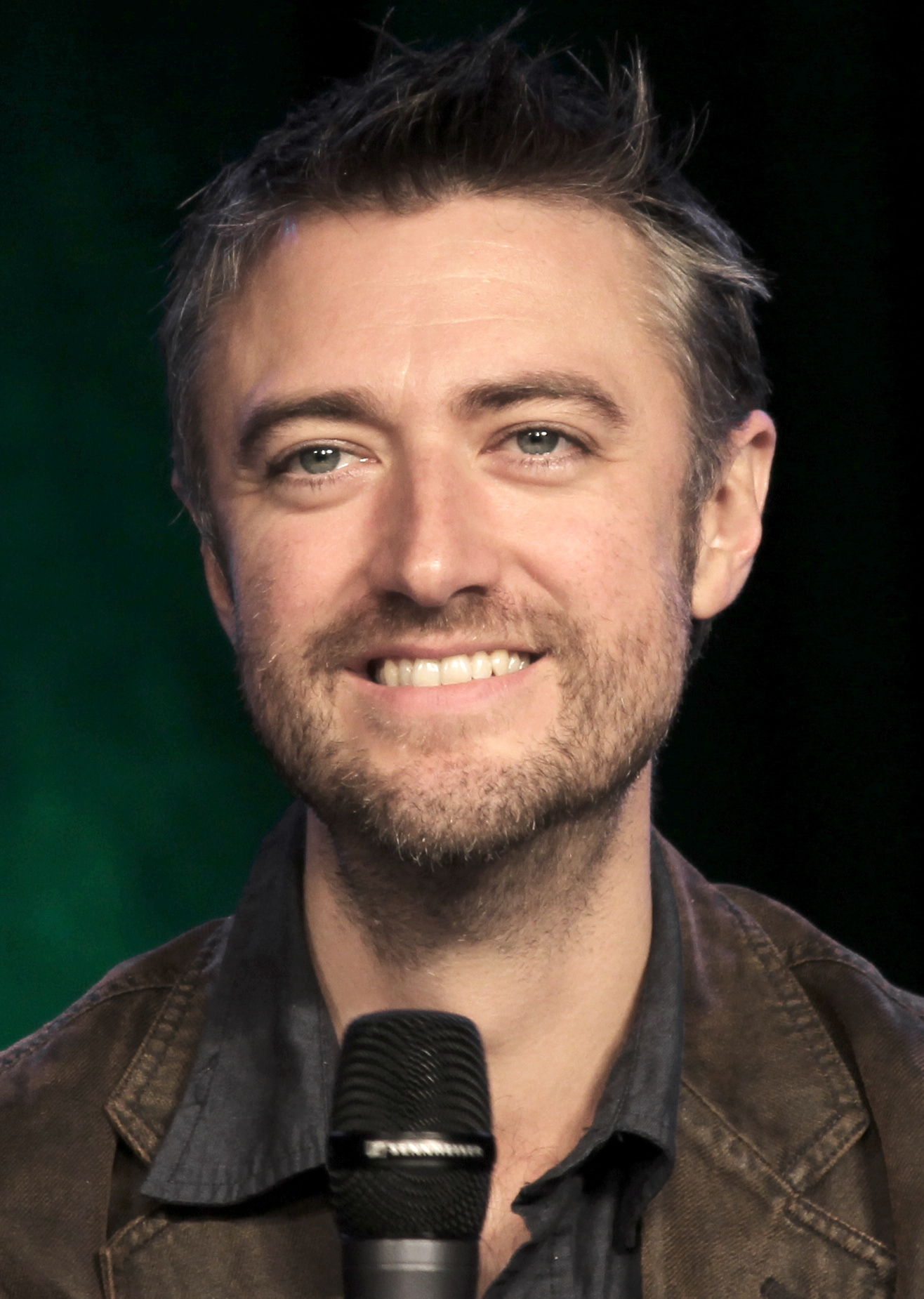
Sean Gunn

Kirk Gleason, portrayed by Sean Gunn, is a quirky and good-hearted character known for his odd behavior and numerous job changes throughout the series, He initially lives with his mother but later moves around, occasionally sleeping in unconventional places like park benches or RVs.

Kirk has had several jobs in town, leading it to become a running joke on the show, as Kirk would have a different job or work venture in every episode.

Sean Gunn, who played different roles in early episodes, settled into the permanent character of Kirk in season 1. Despite appearing as a newcomer, hints throughout the series suggest Kirk has deep roots in Stars Hollow, including connections to long-time residents like Luke and Mrs. Kim. Kirk's romantic life includes a crush on Lorelai and later dating his brother's ex-girlfriend, Lulu. Their relationship evolves, with town support even extending to symbolic gestures like gifting them a piglet when they contemplate starting a family, showcasing the endearing and quirky dynamics of Kirk's journey in the show.

=== Jason Stiles ===
Jason "Digger" Stiles, played by Chris Eigeman, is the son of Carol (Catherine McGoohan) and Floyd Stiles (Lawrence Pressman). He reconnects with Lorelai, whom he knows from camp, and they begin a romantic relationship despite Lorelai's initial resistance. Their affair remains hidden until Floyd's lawsuit against Jason prompts a rift between Lorelai and him. Richard and Floyd conspire against Jason, leading to his professional downfall and relationship breakup with Lorelai. Despite attempts to reconcile, Lorelai has moved on to a relationship with Luke Danes. In the revival, Jason attends Richard's funeral and declares his contentment with life.

=== Logan Huntzberger ===
Logan Huntzberger, played by Matt Czuchry is the second child of Mitchum (Gregg Henry) and Shira Huntzberger (Leann Hunley), a very old money family and heirs to the Huntzberger Publishing Company. He is Rory's college and third boyfriend in the series. The family was modeled after the New York Times publishers, the Sulzberger family. Logan has a strained relationship with his father, who sees him more as an asset than a son, whilst his mother pressures him to marry into the upper class despite her own humble background. Logan is known for witty, charming and mischievous nature with him being able to charm his way out of trouble. Initially depicted as a carefree playboy, Logan is actually well-read, skilled in journalism, and enjoys risky behavior alongside his wealthy friends Colin (Alan Loayza), Finn (Tanc Sade) and Robert (Nick Holmes).

Logan's dynamic with Rory evolves from initial friction to a complicated romantic involvement. They bond over his secretive club, the Life & Death Brigade, and develop feelings, leading to a casual relationship despite Rory's reservations. Their on-off journey includes challenges like Jess's return, disagreements over commitment, and Logan's infidelity during a break. They reconcile temporarily, with Logan proposing after Rory's graduation in season 7, but Rory declines due to career ambitions.

In "A Year in the Life," Logan is working at his family's company in London, UK and is engaged to a French heiress named Odette. Despite his engagement, he and Rory have a secret affair whenever she is in London for work. At the end, Rory is revealed to be pregnant; strongly hinting that Logan is the father of her unborn child, marking a significant but unresolved chapter in their intertwined lives.

== Major recurring characters ==
=== Christopher Hayden ===
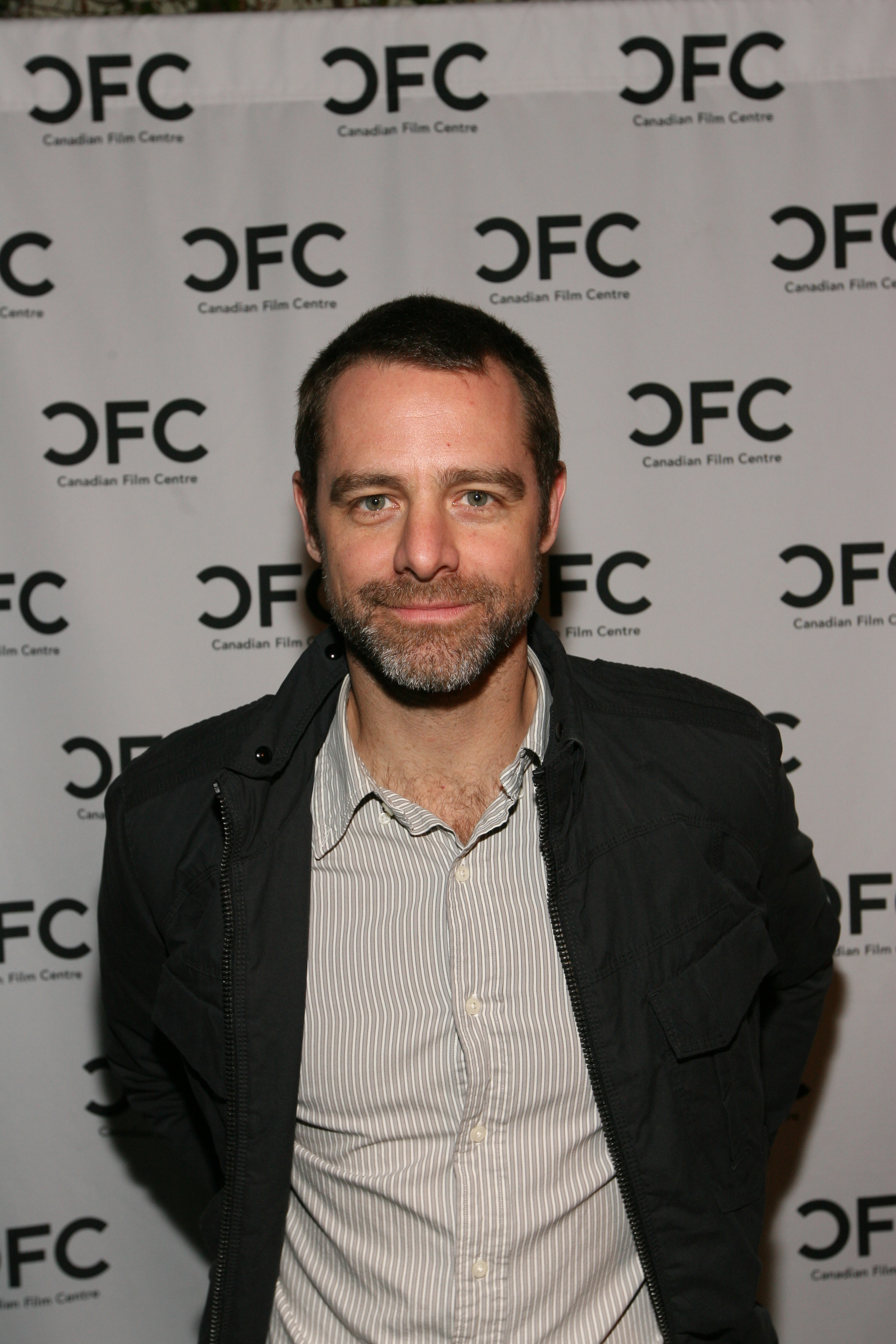
David Sutcliffe

Christopher Hayden, played by David Sutcliffe, is Lorelai's high school ex-boyfriend and Rory's father. He is a member of an upper-class family and was a schoolmate of Lorelai's. In his youth he was a member of the Children of the American Revolution and attended seventeen cotillions and a dozen debutante balls. He first appears in season 1, surprising Rory but leaving Lorelai reserved due to their past. His complicated relationship with Lorelai includes moments of hope for reconciliation, such as when Christopher proposes after a night together but Lorelai declines, feeling that Christopher isn't ready for family responsibilities.

Throughout subsequent seasons, Christopher reappears at pivotal moments, from proving his stability with a steady job to facing challenges like his girlfriend's pregnancy. He becomes more involved in Lorelai and Rory's lives over time, such as paying for Rory's Yale tuition and briefly marrying Lorelai in Paris. However, their relationship remains strained, especially when Christopher expresses a desire for more children, leading to conflicts and a final realization by Lorelai that her love lies elsewhere, ultimately ending their marriage.

In the revival, Christopher has moved on with his life, focusing on the family business and maintaining a relationship while acknowledging Lorelai's role in raising Rory. Despite their complex history, Christopher's love for Rory remains a constant throughout the series.

=== Jackson Belleville ===
Jackson Matthew Belleville, (Note: Jackson's surname began as Melville and changed to Belleville later in the series, without explanation.) portrayed by Jackson Douglas, is Stars Hollow's leading produce supplier known for his commitment to top-quality organic products free from pesticides. His relationship with Sookie St. James, renowned chef and perfectionist, blossomed from shared passions despite their occasional disagreements over ingredient quality. The couple married in season 2, episode 22, with Lorelai and Rory playing key roles.

Their family expanded with the birth of David "Davey" Edward Belleville and Martha Janice Lori Ethan Rupert Glenda Carson Daisy Danny Belleville. Jackson's familial ties extend to his cousin Rune (Max Perlich), whose misadventures led to Lorelai employing him at the Independence Inn. Jackson's protective nature over Sookie often leads to humorous confrontations in Stars Hollow, adding depth to his character.

Aside from family dynamics, Jackson's political stint as town selectman and his love for Creedence Clearwater Revival contribute to his multifaceted presence in the series.

=== Mrs. Kim ===
Emily Kuroda portrays Mrs. Kim, a staunchly conservative Korean mother from Stars Hollow, Connecticut, and mother to Lane Kim, Rory Gilmore's close friend. Mrs. Kim is devout in her Seventh-day Adventist faith and adheres strictly to a vegan diet. She owns Kim's Antiques with a strict "you break, you buy" policy. Mrs. Kim's upbringing of Lane reflects her traditional beliefs, leading to conflicts over Lane's hidden rock music interests and band involvement, culminating in Lane moving out to gain independence while still respecting her mother's rules.

Throughout the series, Mrs. Kim's character evolves as she reconciles with Lane's lifestyle choices, eventually blessing Lane's marriage to Zack after ensuring he can provide for her daughter. Despite initial tensions, Mrs. Kim accepts Lane's pregnancy with twins and prepares to welcome them back home, symbolizing her complete acceptance of their family. Notably, Mrs. Kim's husband, Mr. Kim, remains unseen but is referenced in pivotal moments, adding depth to their family dynamics explored across the show's seasons and specials.

=== Tristin DuGray ===
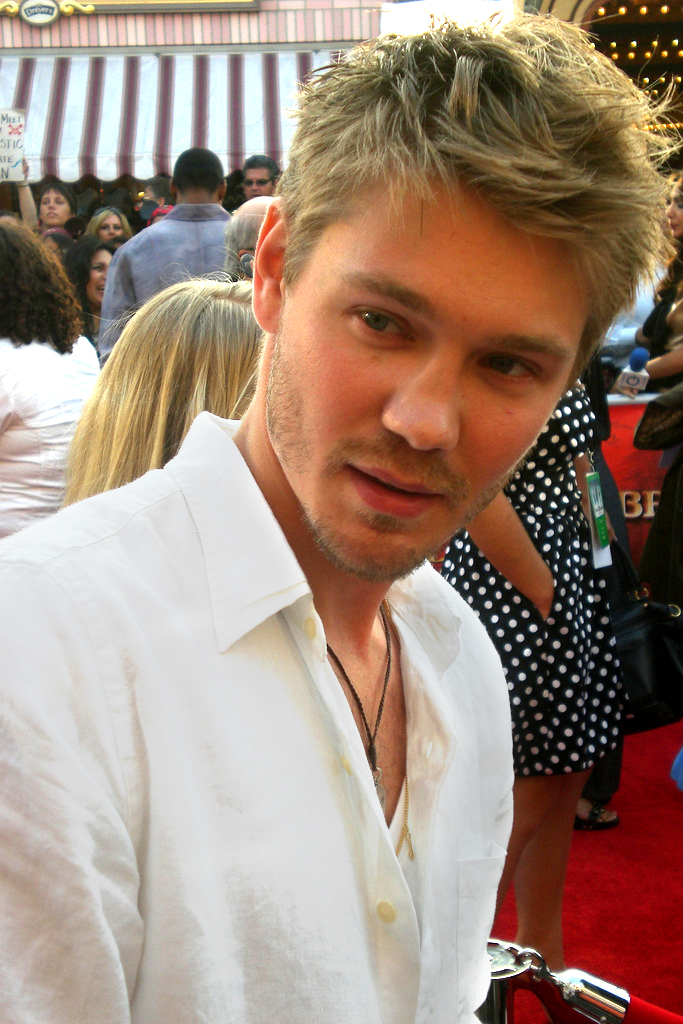
Chad Michael Murray

Tristin DuGray, portrayed by Chad Michael Murray, was a classmate of Rory's at Chilton known for teasing her and causing romantic tension. He initially teased Rory by calling her "Mary," symbolizing her virginity, and later tried to pursue her romantically, causing friction with her classmate Paris. Tristin also became a romantic rival to Rory's boyfriend Dean, attempting to ask her to a dance and later kissing her during a breakup with Dean, leading to emotional confusion for Rory.

Tristin's storyline culminated in him causing further tension between Rory and Paris by lying about Rory accepting his invitation to a concert. He made his final appearance in season 2, where he engaged in pranks at school and ultimately had to leave for military school in North Carolina after the pranks went too far. His departure left Rory to focus on her relationship with Dean without Tristin's interference. In the revival, the role of Tristin was played by Anton Narinskiy, marking a shift in the character's portrayal.

=== Max Medina ===
Scott Cohen portrayed Max Arthuro Medina, a recurring character who served as Rory's English teacher at Chilton during her sophomore year. Max and Lorelai, Rory's mother, became romantically involved after meeting at a parent-teacher meeting. Despite initial conflicts such as Rory arriving late to his class, their relationship progressed, leading to a proposal at the end of season 1 and Lorelai accepting it at the start of season 2. However, Lorelai eventually cancels the engagement due to doubts about her feelings and concerns about Max, and his role as stepfather in Rory's life.

After the breakup, Max continues teaching at Chilton but later returns from teaching at Stanford University in season 3. A kiss with Lorelai reveals unresolved feelings, prompting Max to end their relationship for good. Although Max is not seen again in later episodes, his character's impact is felt through occasional mentions, highlighting the complexities of relationships and personal growth portrayed throughout the series.

=== Taylor Doose ===
Taylor Doose, played by Michael Winters, is the Town Selectman of Stars Hollow known for his conservative and provincial beliefs. Aside from overseeing town events and owning businesses like Doose's Market and Taylor's Old Fashioned Soda Shoppe, Taylor is a stickler for rules and often clashes with residents like Luke Danes and Lorelai Gilmore. Despite briefly losing his Selectman position in season 5 to Jackson Belleville, who quickly resigned, Taylor maintains his influence in town affairs and runs the town meetings at Miss Patty's studio.

Throughout the series, Taylor remains single, with his behavior possibly deterring potential relationships. In "A Year in the Life," he misses cues about participating in a gay pride parade, highlighting his obliviousness to social nuances. Despite his quirks, Taylor's character adds depth to Stars Hollow's dynamics, showcasing the interplay between tradition and change in a small-town setting.

=== Dave Rygalski ===
Dave Rygalski, played by Adam Brody, is a guitarist in the band "Hep Alien" alongside Lane Kim, Zack Van Gerbig, and Brian Fuller. Introduced in the episode "Application Anxiety," Dave responds to Lane's band ad. He and Lane date, with a memorable moment being his misinterpretation of Mrs. Kim's Shakespeare quote as biblical, leading him to read the entire Bible. When Brody left for The O.C., Dave's absence in the show was explained by sending him to college in California, coinciding with the character's move and Zack becoming Lane's romantic interest and eventual husband.

The character Dave Rygalski was inspired by Helen Pai's real-life husband, sharing a similar musical passion and devotion, with Helen Pai being the show's co-producer and inspiration for Lane Kim's character. The name "Helen Pai" is an anagram for the band name "Hep Alien," tying together the real-life influence and creative aspects of the character's development on the show.

=== Marty ===
Marty, portrayed by Wayne Wilcox, was initially introduced in season 4 as the "naked guy" due to a mishap at a party. He later forms a casual breakfast group called "The Breakfast Crew" with Rory and friends. Marty's romantic feelings for Rory surface in season 5 during a disastrous dinner with Logan's friends. Despite Rory's rejection, Marty's storyline continues when he reappears dating Rory's friend Lucy (Krysten Ritter), hiding their past from her. Tensions rise at Lucy's birthday party when Marty's lingering feelings for Rory come to light, causing rifts in their relationships.

In subsequent episodes, Marty's unresolved emotions cause friction between him, Rory, and Lucy, culminating in a revealing dinner where Logan exposes Marty's lingering feelings for Rory, leading to Lucy's breakup with Marty. However, Rory's sincere apology to Lucy helps mend their friendship, with Lucy realizing Rory wasn't at fault. Marty's storyline highlights the complexities of unrequited love and the impact it can have on friendships and relationships within the series.

== Recurring characters ==
=== Stars Hollow ===
- Patricia "Miss Patty" LaCosta (Liz Torres) (2000–2007), Stars Hollow's oft-married, oft-divorced dance instructor. She often makes name-dropping references to her past as a dancer and singer; how much of it is true is unknown. She is usually seen lusting after young men and wishing she could marry again. She and Babette know most of the gossip of the town, though Babette mentions that Patty normally gets the town gossip before her because her phone intercepts other people's phone calls. Second only to Taylor, she seems to be the most influential citizen of Stars Hollow. Her dance studio is used for town meetings, among other community events.
- Babette Dell (Sally Struthers) (2000–2007), eccentric neighbor and friend to the Gilmore girls. She enjoys singing and music; she appears to have been involved with many singers in the past and had a very "interesting" life. She mentions once having been pushed out of a car, and once joining a cult. Often paired with Miss Patty, Babette is very into gossiping. She also is very protective of her garden gnomes, her favorite being Pierpont. She is married to Morey Dell and has a "child", a cat named Cinnamon. After the cat dies, they adopt a new cat named Apricot. She, at least once, ate oatmeal. She is a very attentive neighbor to the Gilmores, calling for help when she is suspicious of trouble and expressing concern for their well-being.
- Morey Dell (Ted Rooney) (2000–2007), Babette's husband, often plays the piano and has an 'anything-goes' mellow attitude. Always wearing sunglasses, he does whatever Babette tells him and is pretty much her opposite as Babette is loud, short, and plump and Morey is quiet, tall, and lanky.
- Andrew (Mike Gandolfi) (2000–2005), owner of Stars Hollow Books and Revolutionary War reenactor.
- Joe (Brian Berke)(2000–2006), pizza delivery man and resident of Stars Hollow.
- Harry Porter (David Huddleston) (2000–2001), Stars Hollow's mayor. He appears in two episodes of Season 1.
- Drella (Alex Borstein) (2000), a skilled but rude and sarcastic harp player, who worked at the Independence Inn for a while. She appears in four episodes of Season 1. Borstein, who plays Drella, was originally cast as Sookie but had to drop out after the pilot episode. Borstein returns in later seasons as the characters of Doris (voice only) and Miss Celine.
- Grant (Grant-Lee Phillips) (2001–2007), the town's troubadour.
- Fran Weston (Linda Porter) (2001–2003), owner of Weston's bakery and the run down building of the old Dragonfly Inn. Fran dies in Season 3. After her death, Lorelai and Sookie buy the building and remodel it, keeping the name in honor of Fran.
- Rachel (Lisa Ann Hadley) (2001), Luke's intermittent ex-girlfriend from days prior to the time period across which the show is set. She is a traveling photographer, and while she and Luke loved each other, their different lifestyles were ultimately unable to mesh. She returns to Stars Hollow during Season 1 but eventually leaves again.
- Clara Forester (Scout Taylor-Compton) (2001–2004), Dean Forester's younger sister. In 2016 revival, she has moved to Berlin with her boyfriend.
- Bootsy (Brian Tarantina) (2001–2002), a Stars Hollow resident who owns and runs the magazine/newspaper stand. He is sometimes a foil for Luke as the two seem to share a common dislike of each other that stems from an incident the two shared in first grade, where Luke blamed Bootsy for ruining a clay handprint of his.
- Tom (Biff Yeager) (2001–2007), a construction contractor in Stars Hollow. He remodels the Twickum House, Lorelai's house, Luke's diner when Luke needs more room and after Kirk ran his car through the window, Taylor's soda shop and both the Independence and Dragonfly Inns.
- Gypsy (Rose Abdoo) (2002–2007), Stars Hollow's wise-cracking mechanic. She is usually one of the first to protest Taylor's harebrained schemes but is nonetheless very involved in town activities.
- Zach Van Gerbig (Todd Lowe) (2002–2007), guitarist and vocalists of Lane's band Hep Alien; he later dates and subsequently marries Lane, and their twin sons Kwan and Steve are born near the end of Season 7. His own father abandoned him when he was ten years old.
- Brian Fuller (John Cabrera) (2002–2007), is the bass player of Lane's band, Hep Alien. At one point, Lane, Zach and Brian also share an apartment. Brian is known for having several ailments including asthma, hypoglycemia, a deviated septum, and rosacea. In Season 6, Brian accidentally causes the band's break-up when he writes a song about Lane, infuriating fellow band member, and Lane's boyfriend, Zach. The band eventually re-unites at Zach and Lane's wedding but disbands once more when Lane becomes pregnant.
- Reverend Archie Skinner (Jim Jansen) (2002–2007, 2016), Stars Hollow's minister. Has a good sense of humor, little patience for Taylor, and a close friendship with Rabbi Barans. He marries Luke and Lorelai in November 2016.
- Rabbi David Barans (Alan Blumenfeld) (2002–2006), Stars Hollow's Rabbi. Like Reverend Skinner, also shows little patience for Taylor and likes to make jokes at his expense.
- Mrs Cassini (Pat Crawford Brown) (2002–2004), resident of Stars Hollow.
- Sophie Bloom (Carole King) (2002–2005, 2016), owner of Stars Hollow's music store
- Gil (Sebastian Bach) (2003–2007), Joins Lane, Zach, and Brian's band Hep Alien, after the band's original guitarist, Dave, moves to California. Gil is much older than the rest of the band, has a wife and kids and owns a sandwich shop. Prior to his days in Hep Alien, he was a member of an unnamed rock band that split up shortly before they could have had their big break. Actor Sebastian Bach was the former singer for the rock band Skid Row.
- Liz Danes (Kathleen Wilhoite) (2003–2007), Luke's sister; she enters the series as a mother to Jess. When she first arrives, Luke is frustrated with her inability to get her life in order, with a history of bad choices and relationships. She later turns her life around when she meets and marries T.J., and she makes a living making and selling jewelry in Renaissance fairs. She and T.J. move to Stars Hollow in Season 6, and the pair have a successful relationship and a child, Doula. Liz becomes Luke's main confidante once he and Lorelai separate. She and Jess are on good terms in 2016.
- T.J. (Michael DeLuise) (2003–2007), husband of Liz and father of Doula. Pretends to be a contractor for a time. His real name is Gary.
- Lulu (Rini Bell) (2003–2007), an elementary school teacher at Stars Hollow who begins dating Kirk. She is eternally cheerful and enthusiastically supports Kirk in even his most bizarre endeavours.
- Kyle (Chauncey Leopardi) (2003–2005), a classmate and friend of Dean's from Stars Hollow High, who went on to lose his hand in the Iraq War and had it replaced by a hook. He does not seem to mind though, often making jokes and using his missing hand to attract girls. (Note that when he is in the Navy, his uniform sleeve incorrectly shows two red diagonal stripes, which are service stripes, which would indicate at least 8 years of Naval service.)
- Lindsay Anne Lister Forester (Arielle Kebbel) (2003–2004), dates and then marries Dean after his breakup with Rory; they later divorce after she learns of his affair with Rory.
- Caesar (Aris Alvarado) (2003–2007, 2016), cook at Luke's Diner. Oft-mentioned before finally making his first appearance in Season 3 Episode 20. He still works for Luke in 2016. Caesar appears in Season 2, Episode 14 and 15, but is played by a different actor.
- Yung Chiu (Samson Yi) (2003), a Korean medical student, who "dates" Lane for a while because their parents want them to. In reality, Lane is dating Dave, while Yung Chiu is dating Karen, a Japanese girl his parents do not approve of. Yung Chiu eventually develops real feelings for Lane and refuses to break up with her, while dumping Karen.
- Carrie Duncan (Jill Brennan) (2004–2005), "Crazy Carrie". Liz's high school friend who had a crush on Luke, who also claims to have made out with Luke while both were in high school, which Luke denies.
- Kyon (Susane Lee) (2004–2006), Korean exchange student whom Lane resents because she believes her mother is trying to replace Lane with her after Lane moves out. Kyon later begins rebelling from Mrs. Kim like Lane had, wearing makeup and liking Avril Lavigne, to Lane's amusement.

=== Chilton ===
- Hanlin Charleston (Dakin Matthews) (2000–2005, 2007, 2016), the headmaster of Chilton Academy. Known to Lorelai as "IL Ducé," Hanlin and his wife belong to the same country club as Richard and Emily.
- Louise Grant (Teal Redmann) (2000–2004) one of Paris's best friends, forming a small clique with her in order for Paris to assert her power. She has a very dry wit and is much more interested in dating boys than succeeding academically. She comes from a wealthy family and is the goddaughter of Helmut Newton. After graduating from Chilton, she attends Tulane University.
- Madeline Lynn (Shelly Cole) (2000–2004), one of Paris's best friends and part of their small clique. Madeline is an effervescent airhead and very friendly. Like Louise, she is more interested in dating boys than succeeding academically. Her parents are divorced and she lives with her mother and very wealthy stepfather in his palatial mansion. She enrolls at Mills College after finishing high school, but later drops out.
- Henry Cho (Eddie Shin) (2001–2002), a Korean-American Chilton student who dated Lane.
- Bradley "Brad" Langford (Adam Wylie) (2001–2003), a Chilton student who is scared of Paris; he leaves to perform in Into the Woods on Broadway (analogous with Wylie's real-life stint in the play on Broadway) but returns later on.
- Francine "Francie" Jarvis (Emily Bergl) (2001–2003, 2016), a popular girl who is a cheerleader and the leader of the Puffs, Chilton's most elite "secret" sorority. Paris mentions to Rory that she's helped Francie with her homework, fluffed up her pom-poms, and secured her a prime parking spot at school in an attempt to get invited to join the Puffs. Francie later recruits Rory (and in turn, Paris) to join the sorority. In Season 3, she is the senior class president, often clashing with both Paris and Rory. She returns in A Year in the Life for an appearance in "Spring".
- Lemon "Lem" (Hilary Salvatore Angelo) (2001), a member of the Puffs whom Rory sits next to at lunch.
- Ivy (Agatha Drake) (2001), a member of the Puffs and Francie's "spokesperson".
- Lisa (Madeline Zima) (2001), a girl who is recruited to join the Puffs, alongside Rory and Paris. She, like Rory, prefers to read alone during lunch.

=== Yale ===
- Tana Schrick (Olivia Hack) (2003–2004), Rory, Paris, and Janet's roommate during Rory's first year at Yale. Tana is a 16-year-old prodigy, with no idea how to react in most social situations, often giving blunt answers to questions when tact or certain levels of discretion would have been called for.
- Janet Billing (Katie Walder) (2003–2005), Rory, Paris, and Tana's roommate during Rory's first year at Yale. She is very athletic and often gets up in the early hours of the morning, infuriating Paris.
- Glenn Babble (Ethan Cohn) (2003–2005), a Yale student whom Rory befriends. He is often seen as an insecure nervous wreck, worrying about very small things.
- Asher Fleming (Michael York) (2005–2006), a brilliant Yale professor and author who dated Paris and many other female students. He dies in Season 5.
- Doyle McMaster (Danny Strong) (2003–2007, 2016), editor of the Yale Daily News during Rory's first year at Yale; later begins dating Paris. He is quick to anger and always seems to be stressed. In A Year in the Life, he has since become a successful Hollywood screenwriter married to Paris (though separating from her during the course of the series), analogous to Strong's real-life success as a writer/producer of films and television series such as Empire and The Butler.
- Robert (Nicholas Holmes) (2005–2006, 2016), member of the Life & Death Brigrade and friend of Logan. He comes to Finn's birthday party with Rory, which makes Logan jealous. When talking to Lorelai, Rory does not know his surname and thinks out "Grimaldi".
- Finn (Tanc Sade) (2005–2007, 2016), an extremely eccentric, Australian friend of Logan and Colin at Yale, he is also forever trying to get Rosemary to go home with him. In Season 5, Finn's catchphrase is "Have we met before?" which he asks Rory many times. When Logan has an accident, he and Colin think about adopting Logan by claiming they are gay.
- Colin McCrae (Alan Loayza) (2005–2007, 2016), a friend of Logan and Finn's at Yale. His dad dated several women so Colin had a lot of different stepmothers. He fell in love with a milkmaid while having vacation in Holland with Finn and Logan.
- Stephanie (Katherine Bailess) (2005) a member of the Life & Death Brigade and a friend of Logan, Colin, and Robert. Rory first spots her, wearing a ballgown and a gorilla mask, jumping into a black SUV and exclaiming In Omnia Paratus (the motto of the Life & Death Brigade). She later attends a weekend event in the woods with other members of the Life & Death Brigade.
- Juliet (Riki Lindhome) and Rosemary (Elisabeth Abbott) (2005–2006), friends of Logan and Rory. According to Rosemary, "Juliet hasn't eaten a full meal since 1994."
- Lucy (Krysten Ritter) and Olivia (Michelle Ongkingco) (2006–2007), two existing friends whom Rory befriends at an art gallery in her final year of college. Lucy is dating Marty when Rory meets her, and the circumstances of their breakup lead to a temporary rift between Rory and the girls, but they reconcile and enjoy graduation together. Lucy is particularly quirky, most notably referring to Marty as "Boyfriend" rather than by name during the entire time they are dating. Olivia refers to all things as being "genius".
- Professor Bell (George Anthony Bell) (2003–2007), one of Rory's professors.
- Bill (Devon Michaels), Arthur "A.K." Karlton (Adam Hendershott), Joanna "Joni" (Rona Benson), Sheila (Amy Sloan) and Raj (Danny Pudi) (2006), staff members at the Yale Daily News.

=== Other ===
- Lorelai "Trix" Gilmore née Gilmore (Marion Ross) (2001, 2003–2004), The original Lorelai. Richard's mother and Lorelai's grandmother, who dies in Season 4. Having never approved of Richard's marriage to Emily, whose family came from a lower social standing (in her opinion), she treats Emily with absolute contempt whenever she visits.
- Straub Hayden (Peter Michael Goetz) and Francine Hayden (Cristine Rose) (2001, 2003), parents of Christopher, whose friendship with Lorelai's parents dwindled after Lorelai became pregnant with Rory. Christopher is shown to have a very negative relationship with them. They appear in two episodes. Straub shows a strong dislike toward Lorelai and even insults Rory. This causes a nearly physical altercation with Richard. When Lorelai was pregnant, Straub suggested abortion, to Emily's strong objection. Straub dies later before ever making amends with his son or having a relationship with his estranged granddaughter. Francine is shown to be less argumentive, but still resistant to accepting Rory as her granddaughter.
- Jamie (Brandon Barash) (2002, 2004), Paris' first boyfriend.
- Sherry Tinsdale (Mädchen Amick) (2002–2003), Christopher Hayden's girlfriend, whom he later marries and then divorces. She later leaves him and Gigi and goes to Paris.
- Nicole Leahy (Tricia O'Kelley) (2003–2004), Taylor's lawyer, whom Luke begins dating and then marries on the spur of the moment on a cruise; they immediately file for divorce, then attempt to reconcile and begin dating again, and then again call it off. Nicole cheats on Luke, and once he finds out that she cheated, the couple break up for good in Season 4.
- Alex Lesman (Billy Burke) (2003), dates Lorelai for a short period. Met at a lecture she and Sookie took before starting their Inn.
- Rune (Max Perlich) (2001), Jackson Belleville's cousin. After a disastrous date with Lorelai, he is eventually hired as the Independence Inn's handyman. He appears in three episodes.
- Beau Belleville (Nick Offerman) (2003, 2005), Jackson Belleville's brother.
- Floyd Stiles (Lawrence Pressman) (2004), father of Jason Stiles and Richard's business partner. Attempts to sue the new business owned by Richard and "Digger".
- Marilyn (Marion Ross) (2004–2005), Richard's cousin. Actress Marion Ross played Marilyn after the death of her previous character, Trix in Season 4.
- Aunt Jun (Denice Kumagi) (2004, 2006), Lane's aunt.
- Mitchum Huntzberger (Gregg Henry) (2005–2007, 2016), Logan's billionaire publisher father, is a frequent antagonist to Logan, Rory and Lorelai. He is a Yale alumnus and member of the Life & Death Brigade.
- Shira Huntzberger (Leann Hunley) (2005), wife of Mitchum and mother of Logan.
- Honor Huntzberger (Devon Sorvari) (2004–2006), Logan's sister.
- April Nardini (Vanessa Marano) (2005–2007, 2016), daughter of Anna and Luke, was unknown to Luke until age 12 when she comes to the diner to obtain a sample of Luke's hair for a school science project. In the revival, she is attending MIT.
- Anna Nardini (Sherilyn Fenn) (2006–2007), sells vintage merchandise; mother, with Luke, of April Nardini. Also plays Sasha, Jimmy Mariano's girlfriend in Season 3.
- Georgia "Gigi" Hayden (Nicolette Collier) (2006–2007), is born in Season 3 to Christopher and Sherry. Rory's half-sister. In 2016, she is living in France.
- Lane's grandmother (June Kyoto Lu) (2006), the mother of Mrs. Kim. Her relationship with her daughter is shown to be similar to the relationship Mrs. Kim has with her own, as all the two do during her visit is argue. She appears to be very critical of her daughter and appears to be the only character Mrs. Kim will answer to. Their relationship may be based on the fact that she is Buddhist, whereas her daughter is Christian, thus, making them clash at Lane's wedding.
- Matthew (John Sloan) (2006), Jess' colleague at Truncheon Books.

== Notable guest stars ==
Actors

- Mädchen Amick (actress, known for Twin Peaks) appeared as Sherry Tinsdale, Christopher Hayden's partner and mother of his daughter GiGi.
- Alex Borstein (Family Guy voice actress of such voices as Lois Griffin as well as MADtv actress) as Independence Inn harp player Drella, ep 1.1, 1.2, 1. 3, 1.4, and as Emily Gilmore's fashion consultant Miss Celine: 3.21, 5.12 Borstein also has an uncredited part as Doris in episode 3.5 Note: Alex was also the original Sookie and had already shot the pilot, before contract obligations with MADtv intervened; she never appeared in the show as Sookie. Alex Borstein was married to Jackson Douglas, who plays Sookie's husband on the show.
- Kathy Baker appeared as Mia, the owner of the Independence Inn in Season 7
- Adam Brody (American actor, best known for his role as Seth Cohen on The O.C.) as Dave (Lane's boyfriend and singer in band), season 3
- George Coe (veteran character actor) appeared as Grandpa Huntzberger in episode 19 of season 5.
- Eileen Davidson (soap opera actress, guest starred as waitress) season 5
- Sherilyn Fenn as Sasha, Jess's Dad's (Jimmy) live-in girlfriend, ep 3.21 and Anna Nardini, the ex-girlfriend of Luke Danes and protective mother of April seasons 6–7
- Elizabeth Franz appeared as the owner of the Independence Inn, Mia, in Season 2
- Joe Fria appeared as a waiter in ep 1.12 (Double Date) and as an old friend of Sookie's who has feelings for her in ep 3.11 (I Solemnly Swear)
- Jon Hamm (American actor, best known for his role as Donald Draper in Mad Men) as Peyton Sanders in Season 3, Episode 5, "Eight O'Clock at the Oasis".
- Victoria Justice (actress, singer and dancer, best known roles as Lola Martinez in Zoey 101 and Tori Vega in Victorious).
- Jessica "Sugar" Kiper (actress and second runner-up on Survivor: Gabon), as Shane (Jess's girlfriend), season 3
- Nancy Lenehan (character actress) guest starred as LaDawn, owner of the Cheshire Cat B&B in ep 2 4
- Traci Lords (actress/former adult entertainer) as an interior decorator, Season 4
- Seth MacFarlane (American animator, screenwriter, producer, director, voice actor and creator of Family Guy and co-creator of American Dad!), ep 2.21 and 3.11 as fellow graduate of business school with Lorelai
- Bruce McCulloch (actor, writer, and director, best known as a member of the comedy troupe Kids in the Hall) as Tobin, night manager of the Independence Inn and day manager of the Dragonfly Inn, in episodes 3.18 and 4.10.
- Chad Michael Murray (American actor, best known for his role as Lucas Scott in One Tree Hill) as Tristin DuGray in seasons 1 and 2
- Nick Offerman (American actor, best known for his role as Ron Swanson on Parks and Recreation) as Beau Belleville, Jackson's brother in ep 4.7 and 6.4
- Max Greenfield (American actor, best known for his role as Schmidt on New Girl) as Lucas, a member of Dean's bachelor party in the Episode: "Chicken or Beef?"
- Melora Hardin (American actress, best known for her role as Jan Levinson on The Office) as Carolyn Bates, a psychiatrist Emily tries to set Christopher up with in ep 6.22.
- Masi Oka (Digital-effects artist and Emmy-nominated actor known for his role as Hiro Nakamura from Heroes) guest starred as a Harvard philosophy student in ep 2.4
- Mary Lynn Rajskub (American actress & singer known for her role as Chloe O'Brian on 24) as "Girlfriend" in Kirk's film in ep 2.19 and as Troubadour in ep 6.22
- Marion Ross (American actress known for her role as Marion Cunningham on Happy Days) as Lorelai "Trix" Gilmore and her niece Marilyn, ep 1.18 3.10 3.15 4.14 4.16 5.13
- Brandon James Routh (credited as B J Routh) (American actor, former fashion model and lead in Superman Returns, Atom/Ray Palmer in the CW Arrowverse series), ep 1.13
- Heidi Van Horne as Vintage Girl, hostess of the USO DAR party, season 6
- Michael York (actor) as Professor Asher Fleming, Season 4
- Jane Lynch, most known for her role in Glee, plays a nurse who annoys Emily Gilmore when Richard Gilmore collapses and is taken into the hospital in season one.
- Rami Malek, best known for his role as Elliot Alderson from Mr. Robot and Oscar-winning performance as Freddie Mercury in Bohemian Rhapsody, guest starred as Andy in episode 4.11. It was his first acting job.

Musicians

- Paul Anka (singer) as himself in Lorelai's dream, ep 6.18. In season six, his name was used for Lorelai's dog.
- Sebastian Bach (singer, best known as the ex-frontman for Skid Row) as Gil (Lane's bandmate), seasons 4–7
- The Bangles (all-female pop band) as themselves, ep 1.13
- Carole King (American singer, songwriter, and pianist) as music store owner, Sophie Bloom, ep 2.20, 5.18, 6.10. She also sings the show's theme song with her daughter, Louise Goffin.
- Pernice Brothers (rock band), ep 6.22
- The Shins (indie rock band) as themselves, ep 4.17
- Sam Phillips (American singer-songwriter) ep 6.22. Also the music producer for the show.
- Grant-Lee Phillips as town troubadour.
- Sonic Youth (rock band) members Thurston Moore and Kim Gordon with their daughter, ep 6.22
- Sparks (rock band), ep 6.22
- Yo la Tengo (rock band), ep 6.22

Politicians and others

- Madeleine Albright (64th and first female United States Secretary of State) as Lorelai Gilmore in Rory's dream, ep 6.7
- Christiane Amanpour (chief international correspondent for CNN) as herself, ep 7.22
- Barbara Levy Boxer (D-California) (American politician and the former U.S. Senator from the State of California) as herself, ep 3.1
- Norman Kingsley Mailer (American novelist, journalist, playwright, screenwriter and film director) as himself, ep 5.6
- Doug Ose (American politician, former Republican member of the United States House of Representatives from 1999 to 2005, representing the 3rd District of California) as himself, ep 3.1

== Unseen characters ==
- Mr. Kim: Lane's father and Mrs. Kim's husband, is referenced in the beginning of the show but is never seen. There has been great speculation around who he is; Mr. Kim is shown in Gilmore Girls: A Year in the Life (2016)
- Al: owner and manager of Al's Pancake World. The quality of his food can be erratic, but the food is the Gilmores' second favorite eating establishment (after Luke's).
- Bitty Charleston: Hanlin Charleston's wife and a good friend of Emily; is often mentioned when Emily hears news of Chilton and Rory before Lorelai does.
- Mrs. Gleason: Kirk's overbearing mother who will not let him have a key and who mothered a lot of children of whom Kirk is the youngest. Kirk still lives with her, but tries to stay out of the house for as long as possible – often inhabiting Luke's until closing time.
- Sookie's third child: The show finished before Sookie was able to give birth to her third child.
- East Side Tilly: a gossip monger rival of Miss Patty and Babette.
