= Matt Czuchry =

American actor (born 1977)

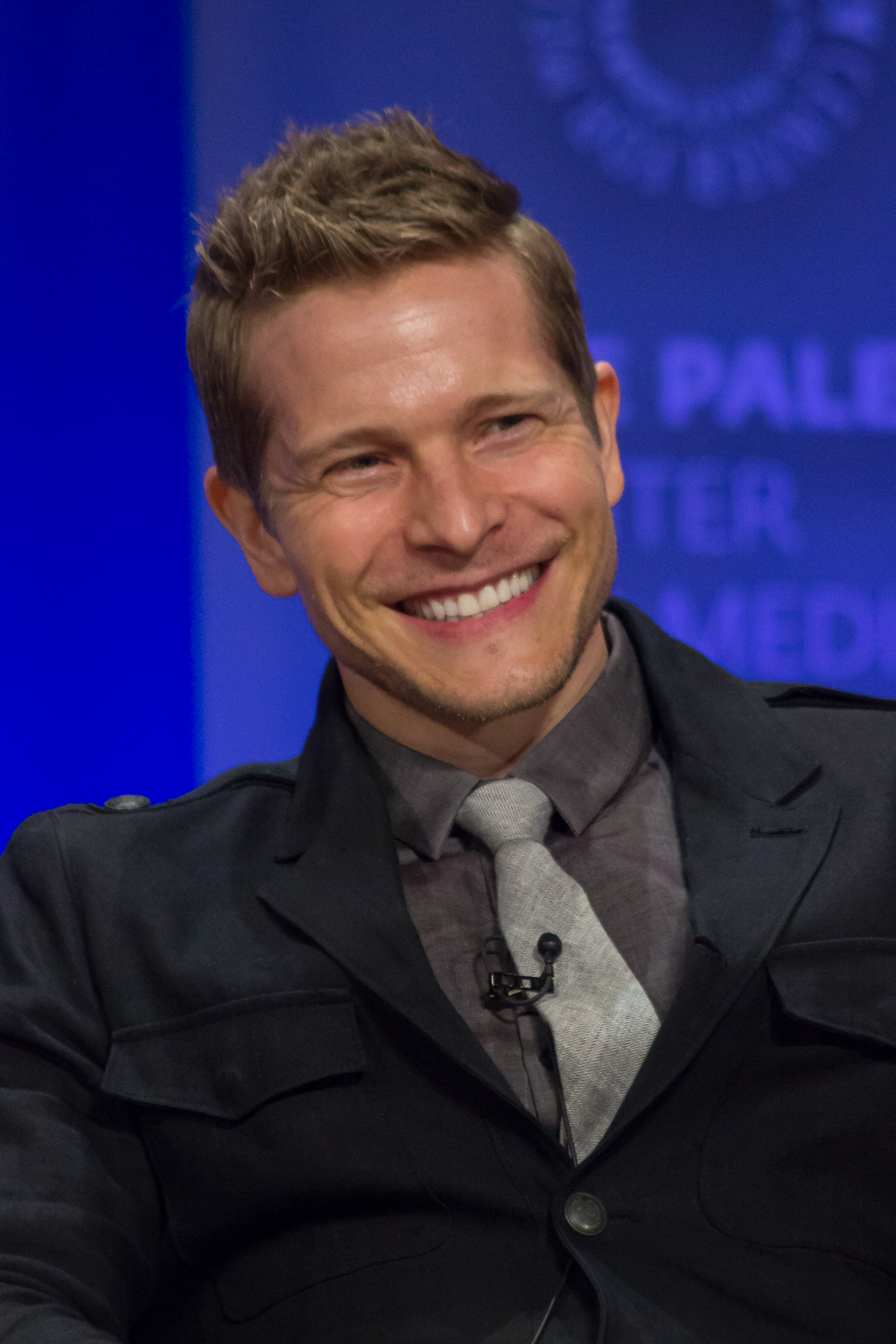
- Czuchry at PaleyFest 2015
- Born: Matthew Charles Czuchry; May 20, 1977 (age 49); Manchester, New Hampshire, U.S.
- Education: College of Charleston (BA)
- Occupation: Actor
- Years active: 2000–present

Matthew Charles Czuchry (/ˈzuːkri/; born May 20, 1977) is an American actor known for playing Logan Huntzberger in Gilmore Girls (2004–2007), Cary Agos on The Good Wife (2009–2016) and Conrad Hawkins on The Resident (2018–2023).

== Early life ==
Czuchry was born in Manchester, New Hampshire, and grew up in Johnson City, Tennessee. His father, Andrew Czuchry, was a professor at East Tennessee State University, and his mother, Sandra, was a homemaker. He is of Ukrainian descent on his father's side. The youngest of four siblings, he has two brothers and a sister.

He graduated from Science Hill High School in 1995, where he was Tennessee state prep tennis singles champion that year. Czuchry attended College of Charleston on a tennis scholarship, captained the men's tennis team, and was an NCAA ranked player in the Southern Conference. He won the Mr. College of Charleston pageant in 1998 and graduated with honors in 1999 with a Bachelor of Arts degree in history and political science.

== Career ==
=== Television roles ===
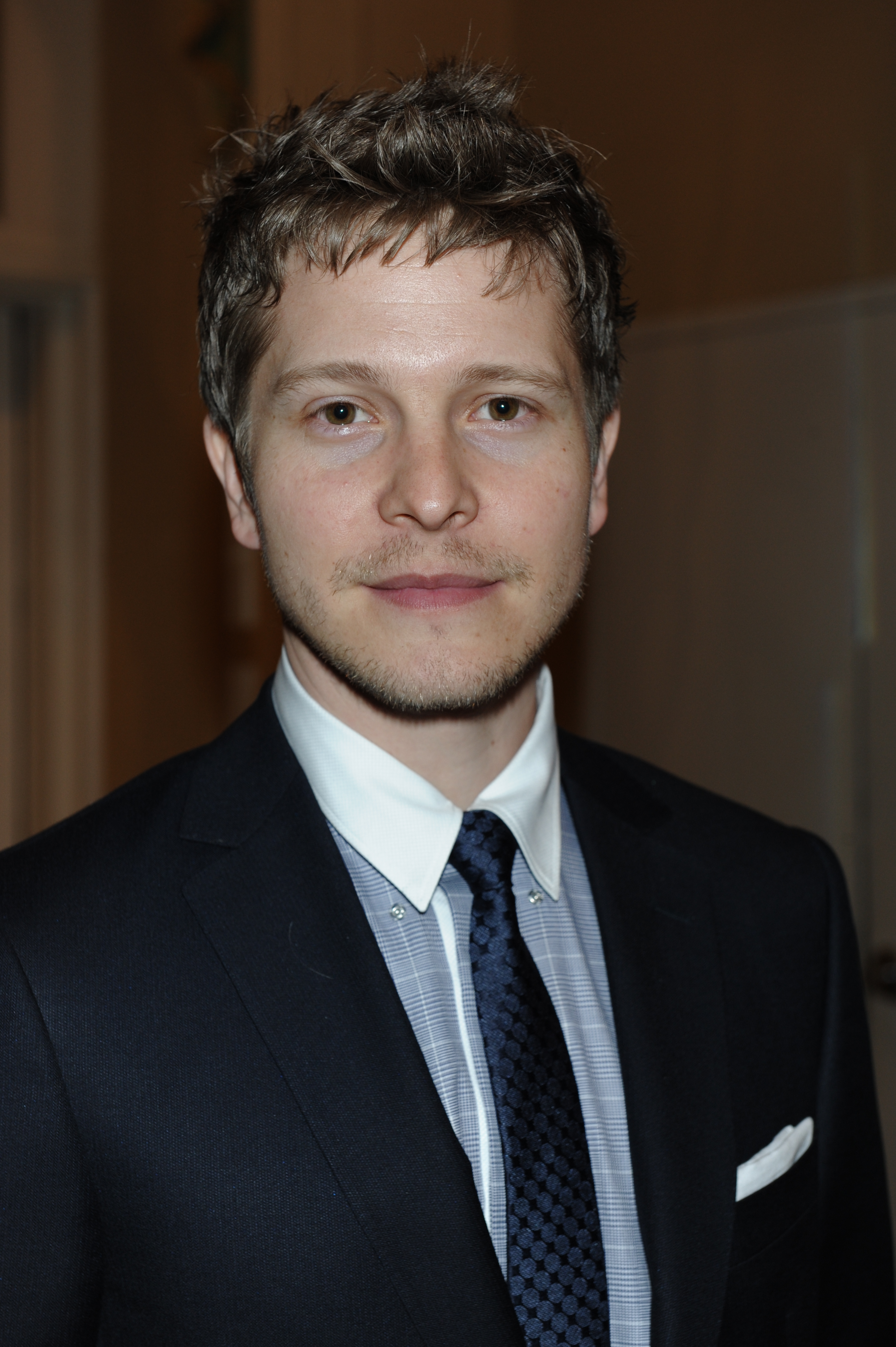
Czuchry at a 2011 Peabody Award ceremony

Czuchry took one theater class in college, and his professor encouraged him to change his major to drama. It was during his first role on The WB's Young Americans that he met Kate Bosworth, whom he dated from 2000 to 2002. He also had guest spots on Freaks and Geeks, 7th Heaven, The Practice, Veronica Mars, and Friday Night Lights. After a recurring role on the CBS television drama Hack and starring in the UPN pilot Jake 2.0, Czuchry received his breakthrough role as Logan Huntzberger on the television series Gilmore Girls in 2004. His role was initially recurring during the series' fifth season before being upgraded to a series regular during the sixth and the seventh season.

From 2009 to 2016, Czuchry portrayed lawyer Cary Agos on the CBS drama The Good Wife. He also reprised his role as Logan Huntzberger on Netflix's reunion miniseries Gilmore Girls: A Year in the Life during 2016.

Czuchry starred in Fox's medical drama series The Resident, which premiered on January 21, 2018. He played the titular character, Dr. Conrad Hawkins. The series was renewed for a second season on May 7, 2018, a third season on March 25, 2019, and a fourth season in May 2020. The drama was then renewed for a fifth and sixth season, concluding in 2023.

In 2023, Czuchry starred in Ryan Murphy's Delicate, the 12th installment of American Horror Story, as Dex Harding Jr..

=== Films ===
Czuchry appeared in the films Eight Legged Freaks and Slap Her... She's French. He played the lead role in the film adaptation of Tucker Max's I Hope They Serve Beer in Hell.

=== Theater ===
From September 11 to October 28, 2007, Czuchry performed in Wendy Wasserstein's play Third opposite Christine Lahti at the Geffen Playhouse.

== Filmography ==
=== Film ===
Year	Title	Role	Notes
2002	Slap Her... She's French	Kyle Fuller	
2002	Eight Legged Freaks	Bret	
2002	A Midsummer Night's Rave	Evan	
2002	Swimming Upstream	Morris Bird III	
2004	Em & Me	Chase	
2009	I Hope They Serve Beer in Hell	Tucker Max	

=== Television ===
Year	Title	Role	Notes
2000	Freaks and Geeks	Teenage guy No. 1	Episode: "We've Got Spirit"
2000	Opposite Sex	Kurt	Episode: "The Field Trip Episode"
2000	Young Americans	Sean McGrail	Recurring role
2002	The Practice	Skip Hyman	Episode: "Fire Proof"
2002	7th Heaven	Carl	Episode: "A Cry for Help"
2003	Jake 2.0	Darin Metcalf	Episode: "The Tech"
2003–2004	Hack	Jamie Farrel	Recurring role
2004	Dark Shadows	Willie Loomis	Unsold pilot
2004–2007	Gilmore Girls	Logan Huntzberger	Main role
2006	Justice League Unlimited	Brainiac 5 (voice)	Episode: "Far From Home"
2006	Veronica Mars	Charlie Stone / Norman Phipps	Episode: "Charlie Don't Surf"
2007	Gravity	Ray	Television film
2008	Friday Night Lights	Chris Kennedy	4 episodes
2009–2016	The Good Wife	Cary Agos	Main role
2010	The 19th Wife	Jordan	Television film
2016	Gilmore Girls: A Year in the Life	Logan Huntzberger	Miniseries; recurring role
2018–2023	The Resident	Conrad Hawkins	Main role
2023–2024	American Horror Story: Delicate	Dexter Harding	Main role
