= Wayne Wilcox =

American actor and singer (born 1978)

- Born: Wayne Alan Wilcox; December 11, 1978 (age 47); Knoxville, Tennessee, U.S.
- Education: Boston University
- Occupations: Actor, singer

Wayne Alan Wilcox (born December 11, 1978) is an American actor and singer who is best known for his role of Marty on the TV show Gilmore Girls and his appearance in the film version of the musical Rent as Gordon, a member of Angel and Tom's AIDS support group. He played the character and sang vocals for the songs Will I and Life Support on disc I of the soundtrack for the film.

== Early life and education ==
Wilcox was born in Knoxville, Tennessee. He is a graduate of Boston University.

== Career ==
Wilcox played recurring character Marty on ten episodes of Gilmore Girls over the fourth, fifth, and seventh seasons after being discovered by Gilmore Girls co-creators Amy Sherman-Palladino and Dan Palladino while working as a waiter at Mercer Kitchen in SoHo, Manhattan.

Wilcox has also appeared in the Goodman Theater production of Elizabeth Spencer's novella The Light in the Piazza as Fabrizio alongside Celia Keenan-Bolger as Clara, and in the off-Broadway production of The Great American Trailer Park Musical in 2005 as Leo/Duke. In 2006, he was performing in the Roundabout Theatre Companies off-Broadway adaption of Suddenly Last Summer, a Tennessee Williams play, as George Holly; Carla Gugino and Blythe Danner also acted in the project.

He has a small role in the movie Interview with Steve Buscemi and Sienna Miller, which had its U.S. premiere at the 2007 Sundance Film Festival. Wayne also played Adult Alexander Ashbrook in Coram Boy, a Broadway version of the successful 2006 National Theater of London production, which opened May 2007.

In 2011, Wilcox appeared in The Normal Heart.

Wilcox portrayed Sydney Chaplin in Chaplin in 2012. From April to June 2015, he acted in the premier of Paul Gordon's Sense and Sensibility at Chicago Shakespeare Theatre, originating the role of Edward Ferrars.

In 2018, Wilcox played the character of Ray in a web series, Only Children, for which he was nominated for Best Lead Actor – Drama at the 2019 Indie Series Awards.

== Filmography ==
=== Film ===
Year	Title	Role	Notes
2005	Rent	Gordon	
2007	Interview	Hunky Actor	
2008	My Sassy Girl	Bar J. Waiter	
2015	Touched with Fire	Carla's New Boyfriend	

=== Television ===
Year	Title	Role	Notes
2003–2006	Gilmore Girls	Marty	10 episodes
2006	Law & Order	Justin "J-Train" Smolka	Episode: "Fame"
2013	Wallflowers	Mark	2 episodes
2018	The Good Fight	Dale Kuzma	Episode: "Day 443"
2018	Elementary	Drew Bishop	Episode: "An Infinite Capacity for Taking Pains"
2018	Only Children	Ray	6 episodes
2019	Fosse/Verdon	Michael Kidd	2 episodes
