= Michael Winters (actor) =

American actor of stage and television (born 1945)

- Born: February 21, 1945 (age 81); Hartford, Connecticut, U.S.
- Occupation: Actor
- Years active: 1987–present

Michael Winters (born February 21, 1945) is an American actor of stage and television. He is best known for playing uptight town selectman Taylor Doose on the WB series Gilmore Girls (2000–2007). He played the role for all seven seasons of the comedy-drama and reprised it for the 2016 revival Gilmore Girls: A Year in the Life.

== Biography ==
On stage, Winters appeared on Broadway in Wrong Mountain. He spent seven seasons with the Oregon Shakespeare Company, including roles as King Lear and Falstaff. He has also played Prospero with the Seattle Shakespeare Company. He previously spent 10 years with the Pacific Conservatory of the Performing Arts and has performed with several other theater companies in Western USA.

His other screen credits include recurring roles on Days of Our Lives and Ally McBeal, and guest roles on Friends, The Nanny, Cheers, Frasier, The Wayan Bros. and Law & Order.

== Filmography ==
=== Film ===
| Year | Title | Role | Notes |
|---|---|---|---|
| 1991 | Until the End of the World | | |
| 1993 | The Hit List | Fingerprint Detective | |
| 1993 | The Temp | Mercer | |
| 1998 | Deep Impact | NASA Guy | |
| 1998 | Love Kills | The Lawyer | |

=== Television ===
| Year | Title | Role | Notes |
|---|---|---|---|
| 1987 | Eye on the Sparrow | Ophthalmologist | TV film |
| 1992 | Brooklyn Bridge | Mr. Myler | "In the Still of the Night" |
| 1992 | L.A. Law | Judge Lester Knot | "Helter Shelter", "Christmas Stalking" |
| 1993 | Nurses | Roy | "Family Outing" |
| 1993 | Between Love and Hate | Process Server | TV film |
| 1993 | Cheers | Security Guard | "The Last Picture Show" |
| 1993 | And the Band Played On | Middle-aged Man | TV film |
| 1995 | The Nanny | Doug Emerson | "The Will" |
| 1995 | Grace Under Fire | Danny | "Emmet's Secret", "Emmet, We Hardly Knew Ye" |
| 1995–96 | The Single Guy | Mike | "Neighbors", "Davy Jones" |
| 1996 | Mr. & Mrs. Smith | Ike Warren | "The Bob Episode" |
| 1996 | Doomsday Virus | Prof. Ernest Helms | TV miniseries |
| 1997 | Home Improvement | The Minister | "Taps" |
| 1997 | Arliss | Oscar Schumacher | "Visionary for a New Millennium" |
| 1997 | Hiller and Diller | Mr. Esclante | "The Play's the Thing" |
| 1997–98 | Ally McBeal | Judge Herbert Spitt | "The Promise", "Cro-Magnon", "The Playing Field" |
| 1998 | The Lake | Dr. Braden | TV film |
| 1998 | Friends | The Doctor | "The One with All the Thanksgivings" |
| 1999 | Providence | Dr. Anthony | "Runaway Sydney" |
| 1999 | The Wayans Bros. | Mr. Crump | "Pops Gets Evicted" |
| 1999 | Invisible Child | | TV film |
| 1999 | Dharma & Greg | Rodney | "Dharma Drags Edward Out of Retirement" |
| 1999 | Jesse | INS Guy | "I Do, I Think I Do" |
| 2000 | Law & Order | Mr. Clayborn | "Narcosis" |
| 2000–2007 | Gilmore Girls | Taylor Doose | Recurring role |
| 2001 | The Guardian | Dr. Ridestrom | "Heart" |
| 2002 | The Division | Spence | "Beyond the Grave" |
| 2003 | The Practice | Dr. Gavin Bloomberg | "Down the Hatch" |
| 2003 | Frasier | Bank President | "Roe to Perdition" |
| 2003 | NYPD Blue | Adam Zaretsky / Dr. Kenneth Hale | "Meet the Grandparents" |
| 2006 | Days of Our Lives | Dr. Jim Finch | 3 episodes |
| 2016 | Gilmore Girls: A Year in the Life | Taylor Doose | TV miniseries |

=== Theater ===
| Year | Title | Role | Notes |
|---|---|---|---|
| 1983 | Twelfth Night | Sir Toby Belch | Marian Theater at Allan Hancock College |
| 1988 | God's Country | Various | ACT |
| 1988 | Principia Scriptoriae | Hans Einhorn | ACT |
| 1989 | Red Noses | Monselet / Bigod | ACT |
| 1989 | Happenstance | Various | ACT |
| 1989 | Woman in Mind | Bill | ACT |
| 1990 | The Falcon | | ACT |
| 1990 | Hapgood | Paul Blair | ACT |
| 1991 | The Kentucky Cycle | | Intiman Theatre |
| 1991 | Our Country's Good | Capt. Jeremy Campbell / Midshipman Harry Brewer / John Arscott | ACT |
| 1991 | Halcyon Days | Raper | ACT |
| 1992 | The Kentucky Cycle | | Center Theater Group |
| 1992 | Shadowlands | C. S. Lewis | ACT |
| 1993 | Lonely Planet | Jody | ACT |
| 1993 | Life During Wartime | Various | ACT |
| 1994 | Gray's Anatomy | Phineas Wingfield | ACT |
| 1994 | Man of the Moment | Douglas Beechey | ACT |
| 1995 | Handing Down the Names | Ensemble | ACT |
| 1996 | Laughter on the 23rd Floor | Val Skolsky | ACT |
| 2000 | Wrong Mountain | Guy Halperin | Broadway |
| 2000 | Talley's Folly | Matt Friedman | ACT |
| 2001 | A Delicate Balance | Tobias | Seattle Repertory Theatre |
| 2002 | Dirty Blonde | Various | ACT |
| 2003 | Absurd Person Singular | Ronald Brewster-Wright | ACT |
| 2004 | Alki | King of the Haints / Ensemble | ACT |
| 2004 | Enchanted April | Frederick Arnott | ACT |
| 2005 | Three Sisters | Ivan Romanich Chebutykin | Intiman Theatre |
| 2005 | Candida | | The Malibu Stage Company |
| 2006 | Richard III | Henry Stafford, Duke of Buckingham | Intiman Theatre |
| 2006 | Heartbreak House | Capt. Shotover | Intiman Theatre |
| 2007 | Stuff Happens | Dick Cheney | ACT |
| 2007 | Heartbreak House | Capt. Shotover | Berkeley Repertory Theatre |
| 2008 | Mame | Uncle Jeff / Mr. Upson | 5th Avenue Theatre |
| 2008 | The Diary of Anne Frank | Mr. Hermann van Daan | Intiman Theatre |
| 2008 | Agamemnon | | The Getty Villa |
| 2008 | Becky's New Car | Walter Flood | ACT |
| 2008–09 | You Can't Take It With You | Grandpa | Seattle Repertory Theatre |
| 2009 | The Tempest | Prospero | Seattle Shakespeare Company |
| 2010 | Cat on a Hot Tin Roof | Big Daddy | Oregon Shakespeare Festival |
| 2010 | The Merchant of Venice | Old Gobbo / Ensemble | Oregon Shakespeare Festival |
| 2010 | Throne of Blood | Old General / Ensemble | Oregon Shakespeare Festival |
| 2011 | Ten Chimneys | Sydney Greenstreet | Arizona Theatre Company |
| 2011 | Henry IV, Part 2 | Sir John Falstaf | Oregon Shakespeare Festival |
| 2011 | Love's Labour's Lost | Holofernes | Oregon Shakespeare Festival |
| 2012 | The Making of a King: Henry V | Various | PlayMakers Repertory Company |
| 2012 | Inspecting Carol | Sidney Carlton | Seattle Repertory Theatre |
| 2013 | King Lear | Lear | Oregon Shakespeare Fesetival |
| 2013 | The Liquid Plain | James De Woolf | Oregon Shakespeare Festival |
| 2014 | A Great Wilderness | Walt | Seattle Repertory Theatre |
| 2014 | The Merry Wives of Windsor | Sir John Falstaff | Colorado Shakespeare Festival |
| 2014 | The Tempest | Gonzalo | Colorado Shakespeare Festival |
| 2015 | The Great Society | Various | Seattle Repertory Theatre |
| 2015 | All the Way | Sen. Richard Russell | Seattle Repertory Theatre |
| 2015 | Long Day's Journey into Night | James Tyrone | Oregon Shakespeare Festival |
| 2015 | The Count of Monte Cristo | Father Dantès | Oregon Shakespeare Festival |
| 2016 | Straight White Men | Ed | The Studio Theatre |
| 2017 | Evidence of Things Unseen | Jack | Taproot Theatre Company |
