= Come Back to Sorrento =

Come Back to Sorrento may refer to:

- Come Back to Sorrento (novel), a novel by Dawn Powell published in 1932 as The Tenth Moon
- Come Back to Sorrento (1945 film), an Italian musical comedy film
- "Come Back to Sorrento", English title of "Torna a Surriento", a Neapolitan song composed in 1894

== See also ==
- Sorrento (disambiguation)
