= Gilmore Guys =

Film and television podcast

'Gilmore Guys'
- Genre: Comedy
- Language: English

Cast and voices
- Hosted by: Kevin Porter; Demi Adejuyigbe (2014–2017); Alice Wetterlund (2018–2023)

Music
- Theme music composed by: Sam Phillips (musician); Carole King
- Opening theme: Maybe Next Week
- Ending theme: Where You Lead

Production
- Length: 60–300 minutes

Technical specifications
- Audio format: MP3

Publication
- No. of episodes: 237
- Original release: October 1, 2014 – June 3, 2017
- Provider: HeadGum
- Updates: Weekly

Related
- Website: gilmoreguysshow.com

'Gilmore Guys' was an audio podcast that follows comedian Kevin T. Porter and writer/performer Demi Adejuyigbe as they watch every episode of the television series Gilmore Girls. The show represented two points of view, as Porter was a longtime Gilmore Girls fan and Adejuyigbe was watching it for the first time. They started the podcast in October 2014, the same day that Gilmore Girls became available on Netflix, and released their final regular episode in June 2017.

The podcast episodes usually featured a weekly guest, including notable figures from the comedy and media world such as Jason Mantzoukas, Paul F. Tompkins, Ben Schwartz, and Michael Ausiello. The Gilmore Guys also performed live shows, taking the podcast on several tours around the United States. Upon completion of their Gilmore Girls coverage, they continued discussing other series created by Amy Sherman-Palladino: Bunheads starting in January 2017 with the name "Bunhead Bros", and then The Marvelous Mrs. Maisel, under the moniker "Maisel Goys", for which Adejuyigbe stepped down and was replaced with Alice Wetterlund.

Although it began as a small show, the podcast gained a strong following. Multiple members of the Gilmore Girls cast and crew joined the Guys for an interview (dubbed 'Gilmore Gabs'), including Lauren Graham, Milo Ventimiglia, Scott Patterson, Kelly Bishop, Sean Gunn, Liza Weil, Keiko Agena, David Sutcliffe, Vanessa Marano, and more. In 2017, Time magazine included Gilmore Guys in their list of "The 50 Best Podcasts Right Now".

== History ==
On September 17, 2014—shortly before Gilmore Girls was made available on Netflix—Kevin Porter tweeted the below, to which Demi Adejuyigbe replied, expressing interest.

Wanna start a podcast where we go through every episode of Gilmore Girls called Gilmore Guys. Who wants to co-host / be a guest?

— Kevin T. Porter (@KevinTPorter)

Porter and Adejuyigbe both grew up in Texas and moved to Los Angeles. Though they had previously met and corresponded (primarily through mutual friends, attendance at live screenings, and UCB shows), they were not close friends and episode 1 of their podcast was the first time they had recorded content together. Porter worked as a freelance editor, and had gained some attention online for his "Sorkinisms" YouTube video, while Adejuyigbe worked as a digital producer and had established a strong following on Vine.

Gilmore Guys began as an independent venture, relying on self-production, self-promotion and word of mouth, but soon gained a following. In June 2015, the guys were invited to take part in the ATX Television Festival in Austin, Texas. They performed two live shows, and worked the red carpet for the Gilmore Girls panel, interviewing cast members as they arrived. The guys continued performing live shows, visiting Los Angeles, New York City, Philadelphia, Washington D.C., San Francisco, Seattle, Portland, Chicago, Minneapolis, Boston, Toronto, Dallas, Austin, Boulder, and Nashville over the course of the series. The live shows also contained humorous musical numbers, and audience Q&A.

In August 2015, Gilmore Guys was picked up by the HeadGum podcast network and gained corporate sponsorship. On October 19, 2015, they released an "Emergency Podcast" after news broke on TVLine that Netflix planned to revive the series for four 90-minute episodes. Porter and Adejuyigbe appeared in several different media to discuss the ramifications of the announcement, including an article written for The Guardian by Adejuyigbe, and an interview segment on NPR. Commenting on how this changed the dynamic of the podcast, Porter joked, "We've transitioned to the living". The Guys finished their coverage of the original seven seasons just before the revival was released, allowing them to comment on Gilmore Girls: A Year in the Life when it was brand new and without any gaps in their weekly installments.

=== Bunhead Bros ===
Early on in the podcast, Porter and Adejuyigbe announced their intention to cover the Amy Sherman-Palladino show Bunheads upon completing all of the episodes of Gilmore Girls. This new series began in January 2017, under the moniker "Bunhead Bros" but still released through the Gilmore Guys podcast feed. During this time the pilot of Sherman-Palladino's new show The Marvelous Mrs. Maisel was released, for which they held a special episode. They completed their commentary of Bunheads in May 2017.

The final episode of Gilmore Guys with its traditional hosts was an interview with actress Lauren Graham, who portrayed Lorelai Gilmore, released on June 3, 2017.

=== Maisel Goys ===
In January 2018, the podcast returned to cover episodes of Sherman-Palladino's new show The Marvelous Mrs. Maisel. Adejuyigbe declined to continue as a host, so Porter teamed up with comedian Alice Wetterlund, who had been a guest for five previous episodes. The pair call themselves the "Maisel Goys" but the series is still released through the Gilmore Guys podcast feed.

== Format ==
=== Review episodes ===
The typical Gilmore Guys podcast episode involved Porter, Adejuyigbe, and usually a guest discussing a previously viewed episode of Gilmore Girls (and later Bunheads). They cover the episodes chronologically and without spoilers for subsequent episodes.

Porter and Adejuyigbe approached the podcast in a relaxed, humorous, and improvisational manner. Their discussions of Gilmore Girls place "equal emphasis on sincere analysis and lighthearted mockery". They also enjoyed discussing the cultural significance of Gilmore Girls, such as how it explores feminism, and placing it in a present-day context. The Guys are known for going on tangents, and often end up discussing a range of other subjects besides Gilmore Girls. The episodes started off averaging an hour in duration, but grew longer until they were typically 2–3 hours long.

Most of the review episodes were recorded in a studio, but around 30 are from live show recordings. Starting with 5.07 these were made available as video episodes on the Gilmore Guys YouTube channel, alongside the traditional audio format.

=== Gilmore Gabs ===
Starting in March 2015, Gilmore Guys started including interviews with people involved with making Gilmore Girls. These differ from the typical episodes, in that they do not discuss a particular Gilmore Girls episode. The "Gabs" involve talking to cast or crew members about their upbringing, careers, how they came to work on Gilmore Girls, and their personal experiences making the show. The Scott Patterson episode garnered considerable attention, not only because it featured a main star of the show for the first time, but because Patterson mentioned "talks" of a Gilmore Girls revival. There are 24 separate Gilmore Gabs episodes.

=== Gilmail Guys ===
The Guys dedicate episodes to answering questions from their listeners. These come in the form of emails, voicemails, and occasionally live calls. There are a total of 25 Gilmail episodes and several "Call my name" episodes.

=== Special episodes ===
Special episodes have come in a variety of forms. Following Edward Herrmann's death on December 31, 2014, Gilmore Guys released a tribute episode which highlighted his contributions to the show. They also did several episodes discussing their expectations for the revival series. As a one-off, they recorded a parody episode called "The Entourage Entourage". They also did a special episode discussing the pilot of Amy Sherman-Palladino's new series The Marvelous Mrs. Maisel.

The guys did a live show called "Live in NYC – The Lost Scripts" in which they performed scripts they had written based on Gilmore Girls characters. The scripts featured many inside jokes from the TV show and the podcast.

=== Recurring segments ===
Pop Goes the Culture

This segment contains a supercut of all of the pop-culture references (which Gilmore Girls was famous for) from the episode under discussion, after which the hosts discuss the varied, and sometimes far-out references. The supercut is regularly over a minute long.

Netflix Synopsis

The Guys read out the Netflix synopsis of the episode and discuss how well they summarise the episode and whether or not they include spoilers for new viewers.

Fashion Report

The Guys begin and end their fashion report with a unified "Fa-Fa-Fa-Fa-Fa-Fa-Fa-Fa-Fa-Fa-Fa-Fa-Fashion!". Each episode, this segment involves the guys breaking down the good, the bad, and the ugly of what the characters wore.

Original WB Promos

The Guys occasionally play Gilmore Girls promos which ran on The WB and CW when the show was on the air (most of them done by the WB's voice announcer, Hal Douglas), creating comedic commentary on the tonal shift between the promos which spoiled episodes and had a tone which did not match that of the show itself. They also play radio promos when available.

Twitter Q&A

The Guys take select questions from Twitter and Facebook (and from the audience at live shows) and answer and discuss them. Before recording each episode of the podcast, they "open the floor" to questions across social media for this segment. Adejuyigbe sings a "Twitter Q&A" jingle to open the segment. In later episodes, the Guys started running polls on Twitter to gauge their audience's opinion on certain matters, which they would then discuss on the podcast.

Television Without Pity

Beginning in their coverage of season 5, the Guys read and discuss comments from the now-defunct Television Without Pity, also referred to as TWoP, which continues to maintain their forums, including one for Gilmore Girls, in archived form. These comments were all posted at the time that episodes originally aired. Occasionally, Porter will come across comments that he posted, and either he or Adejuyigbe will read them on air. To open the segment, the Guys play clips from popular songs or films and replace words from the songs with "TWoP".

Rating the Episode

At the end of each podcast episode, Kevin, Demi, and their guest assign the Gilmore Girls episode a rating (typically on a scale of 1 to 10). The rating standard is usually a humorous object or idea from the episode, such as "Wal-Mart Employee of the Month Plaques".

Season	Kevin's Rating	Demi's Rating	Overall*
1	7.71	7	7.33
2	7.52	7	7.36
3	7.56	7.2	7.4
4	8.10	8.07	7.93
5	7.98	7.77	7.61
6	7.52	7.16	7.28
7	3.37	5.71	5.15

*Overall Ratings factor in Kevin, Demi, and their guests' ratings for each episode.

Where You Tweet, I Will Follow

Kevin and Demi give guests the opportunity to plug their upcoming projects, performances, and social media accounts. The guys will also plug their own social media accounts. Starting in their coverage of the fifth season of Gilmore Girls, in keeping with the pop culture theme of the show, the Guys and their guest each also give a "pop culture plug" where they plug a TV show, movie, album or book they are enjoying. Where You Tweet, I Will Follow is the only recurring segment to be included in the Gilmore Gabs episodes as well as the standard review episodes.

Each episode concludes with the guys and their guest singing along to Where You Lead, the theme from Gilmore Girls.

== Recognition and ratings ==
Gilmore Guys first gained recognition when they were featured in an article for The Atlantic in December 2014, after which it ranked number one on iTunes comedy podcasts. By December 2015, the episodes had been downloaded five million times, for an average of 40,000 listeners per episode. The same month, The Hundreds included Gilmore Guys on their list of the ten "Best Podcasts of 2015". In January 2016, the podcast was nominated for a Shorty Award in the category of Best Podcast. By November 2016, they were getting between 150,000 and 200,000 downloads per episode.

An article in Time magazine described how "The podcast has created a community, its own language and a galley of recurring jokes and references, such as affectionately referring to fans as "Gillies," or teasing Porter for easily crying at the show's more emotional moments." Sadaf Ahsan of the National Post commented that the podcast "helped reignite – and, for some, initiate – fan fervour" towards Gilmore Girls, thus helping lead to its revival. In 2017, Time named Gilmore Guys one of the "Top 50 Podcasts Right Now".

Porter and Adejuyigbe were given a cameo appearance on the Gilmore Girls revival miniseries A Year in the Life. The duo also appeared for short segments of commentary about Gilmore Girls on the Up television network.

They were interviewed in the SMTY (stuff mom never told you) episode 'Gilmore Girls and Guys.'

== Episode list ==
=== Season 1 ===
No.	Title	Guest	Original release date
1	"1.01 Pilot"	N/A	October 1, 2014
In the first episode, Kevin and Demi discuss the tone of Gilmore Girls, and the effectiveness of the show's pilot. Kevin's Melissa McCarthy impression makes its first appearance, and the guys devise their rating system for the show. Kevin's Rating: 8 Miss Pattys; Demi's Rating: 7 Cups of Coffee
2	"1.02 The Lorelais' First Day at Chilton"	N/A	October 6, 2014
The guys discuss Gilmore Girls production value, the Mean Girls-esque clique of Madeline, Louise, and Paris, as well as their mutual love for Emily and Miss Patty while reviewing the series' second episode. First appearance of Pop Goes the Culture; Kevin's Rating: 8 Chiltons; Demi's Rating: 8 Turtles that look like Frogs; Recurring Bits: "Alexis Bledel Couldn't Make It", "Bob Odenkirk...We Love You, Come on the Show", "Is Michel Black?", Kevin's Melissa McCarthy Impression
3	"1.03 Kill Me Now"	N/A	October 8, 2014
The guys touch on Michel's redeeming qualities as an employee, the show's overall dramatic conflict, and Hollywood's double standards for women while discussing episode 1.03. First appearance of the Fashion Report; Kevin's Rating: 8 Cute Rastafarian Hats; Demi's Rating: 8 Blueberry Shortcakes; Recurring Bits: "Yanic Truesdale/Barack Obama/Liza Weil/Seth MacFarlane...We Love You, Come on the Show", "Alexis Bledel Couldn't Make It"
4	"1.04 The Deer Hunters"	Anthony Troli	October 13, 2014
The guys welcome their first guest, Anthony Troli, to the podcast. They discuss the episode's symbolism, and sitcom-ish characteristics, while taking detours to discuss the Troli family history. Kevin's Rating: 7 Limping Deer; Demi's Rating: 8 Broken Globes; Guest Rating: 8 Broken Globes; Recurring Bits: "Alexis Bledel Couldn't Make It", "Chris Hardwick/Adam Carolla...We Love You, Come on the Show", Kevin's Melissa McCarthy Impression
5	"1.05 Cinnamon's Wake"	N/A	October 15, 2014
The guys get together to talk about episode 5. They discuss Lane "skanking" to Rancid, how the episode's cold open often feels disconnected from the rest of the episode, and the deep resonance of the show's dramatic moments. Kevin's Rating: 6 Racoons; Demi's Rating: 7 Weird Cornrows; Recurring Bits: Kevin's Melissa McCarthy Impression, "Alexis Bledel Couldn't Make It", "Anthony Jeselnik/Keiko Agena...We Love You, Come on the Show"
6	"1.06 Rory's Birthday Parties"	Kate Spencer	October 20, 2014
The guys are joined by UCB veteran, and first-time Gilmore Girls viewer Kate Spencer to gab about episode 6. They discuss Dean's hair, Lorelai's relationship with her parents, how much Kate wishes that she liked the show. Kevin's Rating: 10 $12 Bracelets; Demi's Rating: 9 Birthday Cakes with Rory's Face; Guest Rating: 6.5 Cups of Coffee; Recurring Bits: "Alexis Bledel Couldn't Make It", "Jason Mantzoukas/Liza Weil/Jared Padalecki/Lauren Graham...We Love You, Come on the Show"
7	"1.07 Kiss and Tell"	N/A	October 22, 2014
The guys gab about Rory & Dean's first kiss, Dean's attitude, and the dynamic between Taylor and Luke. First appearance of the Netflix Synopsis; Kevin's Rating: 8 Chickens; Demi's Rating: 7 Boxes of Corn Starch; Recurring Bits: "Alexis Bledel Couldn't Make It", "Winona Ryder...We Love You, Come on the Show"
8	"1.08 Love and War and Snow"	Jamie Woodham	October 27, 2014
The guys welcome comedian Jamie Woodham to the podcast to discuss Rory's "I'm Talking Legos" line, Miss Patty's lack of sexual boundaries, and Emily & Richard's ordeal of cooking a frozen pizza, while pondering what happened to Mr. Kim. Kevin's Rating: 7 Sergeant Pepper Hats; Demi's Rating: 5 Hair Tussles; Guest Rating: 8 Pizzas; Recurring Bits: "Alexis Bledel Couldn't Make It", "Brody Stevens/Sam Phillips (musician)/Squarespace...We Love You, Come on the Show", Kevin's Melissa McCarthy Impression
9	"1.09 Rory's Dance"	Anna Lore	October 29, 2014
Anna Lore joins the guys to gab about episode 1.09 and propose new podcasts ranging from House to Charles Manson. The trio lauds Melissa McCarthy's effervescent performance and knack for physical comedy, and break down the episode's intense fourth act. Kevin's Rating: 9 Portable Dorothy Parkers; Demi's Rating: 8 Beanbags; Guest Rating: 8 Paris' Cousins; Recurring Bits: "Alexis Bledel Couldn't Make It", Kevin's Melissa McCarthy Impression
10	"1.10 Forgiveness and Stuff / 1.11 Paris is Burning"	N/A	November 3, 2014
The guys tackle two episodes in one take, and answer a few questions in the "mailbag" (precursor to the "Gilmail Guys" episodes), with discussion topics ranging from Luke "whoring himself out" for Lorelai's coffee to Emily's playfulness at Friday night dinner. They both proclaim their love for Sookie, and agree that while Michel is entertaining, he is a terrible employee and should be fired. Kevin's Rating: 8 Blue Baseball Hats / 7 Proust Books; Demi's Rating: 6 Lost Baby Jesus Arms / 7 Old Girlfriend Spaghetti Recipes; Recurring Bits: "Alexis Bledel Couldn't Make It", Kevin's Melissa McCarthy Impression, Jane Lynch...We Love You, Come on the Show
11	"1.12 Double Date"	Eliza Skinner	November 5, 2014
Kevin is joined by guest host Eliza Skinner to discuss episode 1.12. They tackle the anachronism of a Fugazi shirt, discuss the lack of realism in both Lane and Lorelai's dates, and propose a Rune spinoff. Kevin's Rating: 6 Fresh Clams; Demi's Rating: N/A; Guest Rating: 6 Wet Meringues; Recurring Bits: "Alexis Bledel Couldn't Make It"
12	"1.13 Concert Interruptus / 1.14 That Damn Donna Reed"	TBA	November 10, 2014
Kevin & Demi reunite to break down episodes 1.13 and 1.14. Both guys express their love for Paris and Babette, as well as their hatred for Tristin. They take notice of the terrifying clown pillow, ponder Taylor's sexuality, and Demi makes his prediction for when Rory's first time will take place. First occurrence of the iTunes Review Rap; Kevin's Rating: 8 Weird Leopard-Print Bono Hats / 7 Green Jell-O's with the Cool Whip; Demi's Rating: 6 Eternal Flames / 7 Sister Suffragettes; Recurring Bits: "Alexis Bledel Couldn't Make It", "Jon Hamm/Jason Mantzoukas...We Love You, Come on the Show"
13	"1.15 Christopher Returns"	Ben Siemon	November 12, 2014
Actor Ben Siemon joins the guys to discuss the first episode featuring Christopher. They analyze Christopher's character, pointing out the multiple vague references to his "business", compare Emily to Lucille Bluth, and share their love for Ms. Patty. Additionally, they discuss the unique story structure on Gilmore Girls and how it differs from traditional television storytelling. Kevin's Rating: 8 Lucy Pajamas; Demi's Rating: 8 Business Transactions; Guest Rating: 8 Oversized Dictionaries; Recurring Bits: "Alexis Bledel Couldn't Make It"
14	"1.16 Star-Crossed Lovers and Other Strangers / 1.17 The Breakup, Part 2"	TBA	November 17, 2014
Kevin's Rating: 8 Turtlenecks / 9 Corn Starches; Demi's Rating: 7 Weird Supervillain Haircuts / 10 Pizzas with Everything; Recurring Bits: "Alexis Bledel Couldn't Make It"
15	"1.18 The Third Lorelai"	Krista Doyle	November 19, 2014
Kevin's Rating: 9 Clown Donuts; Demi's Rating: 8 Unanswered Voicemails; Guest Rating: 8 Weird Dog Statues; Recurring Bits: "Alexis Bledel Couldn't Make It"
16	"1.19 Emily in Wonderland"	Allie Goertz	November 24, 2014
Kevin's Rating: 9 Ketchup Bottles; Demi's Rating: 6 Hobos! Guest Rating: 8 Rhinestones; Recurring Bits: "Alexis Bledel Couldn't Make It"
17	"1.20 P.S. I Lo..."	Beth Stelling	November 25, 2014
Kevin's Rating: 7 Justin Timberlake Posters; Demi's Rating: 6 Copies of Out of Africa; Guest Rating: 6 Cat Pot Holders; Recurring Bits: "Alexis Bledel Couldn't Make It"
18	"1.21 Love, Daisies, and Troubadours"	TBA	November 26, 2014
Kevin's Rating: 5 Daisies; Demi's Rating: 3 Souls of Nico; Recurring Bits: "Alexis Bledel Couldn't Make It", Kevin's Melissa McCarthy Impression

=== Season 2 ===
No.	Title	Guest	Original release date
19	"2.01 Sadie, Sadie"	Brian Huskey	December 1, 2014
Kevin's Rating: 7 Twinkies; Demi's Rating: 6 Comically Oversized Suitcases; Guest Rating: 6 Deans
20	"2.02 Hammers and Veils"	Anthony King	December 3, 2014
Kevin's Rating: 7.5 Thrones; Demi's Rating: 8 Pooka Shell Necklaces; Guest Rating: 6 Newspaper Veils
21	"Gilmail Guys Vol. 1"	TBA	December 4, 2014
Kevin and Demi respond to emails and voicemails sent in by fans of the podcast. Recurring Bits: Kevin's Melissa McCarthy Impression
22	"2.03 Red Light on the Wedding Night"	Tara Copeland	December 8, 2014
Kevin's Rating: 6 Nice Chickens; Demi's Rating: 8 Huppahs; Guest Rating: A Town with only 2 Stoplights*; Recurring Bits: "Tom Hanks Couldn't Make It"
23	"2.04 The Road Trip To Harvard"	Anthony Troli	December 10, 2014
Kevin's Rating: 5 Black Professors; Demi's Rating: 5 Contract Disputes; Guest Rating: 6 Cheshire Cats; Recurring Bits: "Tom Hanks Couldn't Make It", Kevin's Melissa McCarthy Impression
24	"2.05 Nick & Nora / Sid & Nancy"	Ben Rodgers	December 15, 2014
Kevin's Rating: 6 Gnomes; Demi's Rating: 4 Nicotine Patches; Guest Rating: 10 out of 10
25	"2.06 Presenting Lorelai Gilmore"	Louis Peitzman	December 17, 2014
Kevin's Rating: 9 Cotton Ball Dresses; Demi's Rating: 8 Tape Recorders; Guest Rating: 8 Lonely Seamen
26	"2.07 Like Mother, Like Daughter"	Jeff Hiller	December 22, 2014
Kevin's Rating: 8 Matching Red Dresses; Demi's Rating: 9 Hanson Sodas; Guest Rating: 9 Supreme Court Justice References
27	"2.08 The Ins and Outs of Inns"	Jamie Woodham	December 24, 2014
Kevin's Rating: 8 Caucasian Chalk Circles; Demi's Rating: 8 Annoying Frowns; Guest Rating: 8 Freestyling Kevins
28	"Gilmail Guys Vol. 2"	TBA	December 29, 2014
Kevin and Demi respond to emails and voicemails sent in by fans of the podcast.
29	"2.09 Run Away Little Boy"	TBA	December 31, 2014
Kevin's Rating: 9 Bags of Flour; Demi's Rating: 7 Reassembled Cars
30	"Remembering Edward Herrmann"	TBA	January 5, 2015
A tribute episode of Edward Herrmann's best Gilmore Girls moments.
31	"2.10 The Bracebridge Dinner"	TBA	January 7, 2015
Kevin's Rating: 9 Snowmen; Demi's Rating: 9 Boomboxes
32	"2.11 Secrets and Loans"	Ben Siemon	January 12, 2015
Kevin's Rating: 7 Pens; Demi's Rating: 6 Poorly-Photoshopped Pajamas; Guest Rating: 6 Porch Holes
33	"2.12 Richard in Stars Hollow"	Patrick Walsh	January 14, 2015
Kevin's Rating: 10 Grapefruits; Demi's Rating: 6 Bowls of Rice-A-Roni; Guest Rating: 7 Boogaloos
34	"2.13 A-Tisket, A-Tasket"	Julieanne Smolinski	January 19, 2015
Kevin's Rating: 7 Baskets; Demi's Rating: 6 Tupperware Containers of Mystery Tuna; Guest Rating: 7.5 Kirk Siblings
35	"2.14 It Should Have Been Lorelai"	TBA	January 21, 2015
Kevin's Rating: 8 Volvos; Demi's Rating: 8 Fuzzy Arm-Sleeve Bands
36	"2.15 Lost and Found"	TBA	January 26, 2015
Kevin's Rating: 6 Sledgehammers; Demi's Rating: 6 Astronomy Sections
37	"2.16 There's the Rub"	Neil Campbell	January 28, 2015
Kevin's Rating: 7 Indian Food Delivery Men; Demi's Rating: 7 Adulterers; Guest Rating: 8 Pieces of Drywall Falling from the Ceiling
38	"2.17 Dead Uncles and Vegetables"	Allie Goertz	February 2, 2015
Kevin's Rating: 5 Sexy Squashes; Demi's Rating: 5 Turnips; Guest Rating: 5 out of 10
39	"2.18 Back in the Saddle Again"	TBA	February 4, 2015
Kevin's Rating: 8 Tricked-Out First Aid Kits; Demi's Rating: 7 Issues of "Jane" Magazine
40	"Gilmail Guys Vol. 3"	TBA	February 5, 2015
Kevin and Demi respond to emails and voicemails sent in by fans of the podcast.
41	"2.19 Teach Me Tonight"	Sean Clements	February 9, 2015
Kevin's Rating: 8 Totaled Cars; Demi's Rating: 6 out of 10; Guest Rating: 7.4 (500 out of 675) Baseballs
42	"2.20 Help Wanted"	TBA	February 11, 2015
Kevin's Rating: 8 Peaches / Swedes; Demi's Rating: 8 Beat-Up Duffel Bags
43	"2.21 Lorelai's Graduation Day"	Aisha Muharrar	February 16, 2015
TV Writer, Aisha Muharrar (Parks and Recreation) joins the guys to discuss Lorelai's graduation episode, while pointing out that the show has barely mentioned her going to school for the past year. They speculate about what happened to Dean between seasons 1 and 2 to make him dumber and angrier, and discuss how Jess has become more palatable, proposing a new segment titled "Say Yes to the Jess". Kevin points out the appearance of "Gilmore DNA" in shows such as Parks and Recreation and Playing House, and requests that Netflix reboot Gilmore Girls for Season 8. Kevin's Rating: 8 Tassle-Hat Cakes; Demi's Rating: 9 Surprisingly Good Hot Dogs; Guest Rating: 9 Spit Cans; Recurring Bits: Michelle Obama Couldn't Make it / Adam Wylie...We Love You, Come on the Show
44	"Call Our Name Vol. 1"	TBA	February 18, 2015
Live Call-In Episode
45	"2.22 I Can't Get Started"	DC Pierson	February 19, 2015
Kevin's Rating: 9 Unwanted Pregnancies; Demi's Rating: 9 Poodles; Guest Rating: 10 Lane Drum Fills

=== Season 3 ===
No.	Title	Guest	Original release date
46	"3.01 Those Lazy-Hazy-Crazy Days"	TBA	February 23, 2015
Kevin's Rating: 7 Bags of Scone Mix; Demi's Rating: 7 First-Time Customer Donuts
47	"3.02 Haunted Leg"	Elizabeth Laime	February 25, 2015
Kevin's Rating: 7 Krispy Kreme Donuts; Demi's Rating: 7 Bowls of Cereal with Marshmallows; Guest Rating: 6 Locked Jaws
48	"3.03 Application Anxiety"	TBA	March 2, 2015
Kevin's Rating: 7 Furry Rabbit Suits; Demi's Rating: 7 Large Horses
49	"3.04 One's Got Class and the Other One Dyes"	Anthony Troli	March 4, 2015
Kevin's Rating: 7 Pictures of Butch; Demi's Rating: 5 Snoopy Tattoos / Untouchables; Guest Rating: 6.5 Hawaiian Shirts
50	"3.05 Eight O'Clock at the Oasis"	Hayes Davenport	March 9, 2015
Kevin's Rating: 6 Oasis Cuckoo Clocks; Demi's Rating: 5 Trivial Pursuits; Guest Rating: 10 Richards
51	"3.06 Take the Deviled Eggs..."	TBA	March 11, 2015
Kevin's Rating: 6.8 Ripped Mystery Protest Banners; Demi's Rating: 7 Baby Diapers full of Ammonia
52	"Gilmore Gab: Sam Phillips (musician) & Helen Pai"	TBA	March 12, 2015
Sam Phillips (musician), the composer from Gilmore Girls, and Helen Pai, one of the show's producers join Kevin and Demi to discuss their roles on Gilmore Girls. They delve into the behind-the-scenes aspects of the show, Philips' favorite music cues from the show, and the similarities between Pai and the character of Lane Kim.
53	"3.07 They Shoot Gilmores, Don't They?"	Jason Mantzoukas	March 16, 2015
Jason Mantzoukas explains why he loves Jess. The trio discusses their favorite Stars Hollow townies. They praise the directing, costumes, and plot of the episode. Jason Mantzoukas tells Kevin and Demi about the time he auditioned for Gilmore Girls. They express their appreciation for the way in which the show approaches the teen romance. They all agree that this is one of the best episodes of the series. Kevin's Rating: 10 Eggless Egg Salads; Demi's Rating: 9 Untouchable Bullhorns; Guest Rating: 10 Bare-Naked Ladies Playing Trombone
54	"3.08 Let the Games Begin"	Jamie Woodham	March 18, 2015
Kevin's Rating: 9 Yale Brochures; Demi's Rating: 9 Romantic Trash Cans; Guest Rating: 8.5 Wows
55	"Gilmail Guys Vol. 4"	TBA	March 19, 2015
Kevin and Demi respond to emails and voicemails sent in by fans of the podcast.
56	"3.09 A Deep-Fried Korean Thanksgiving"	Sarah Heyward	March 23, 2015
Kevin's Rating: 9 Tofurkeys; Demi's Rating: 9 Bring-Your-Own Soup Ladles; Guest Rating: 8.5 Bitten-Off Chocolate Turkey Heads
57	"Gilmore Gab: Matt L. Jones"	TBA	March 24, 2015
Actor Matt L. Jones joins the guys to discuss how he got his first acting job on Gilmore Girls in episode 3.09.
58	"3.10 That'll Do Pig"	Sarah Ramos	March 25, 2015
Kevin's Rating: 8 Corn Lattes; Demi's Rating: 6 Custard Pies; Guest Rating: 6 Jess's Puffy Vests
59	"3.11 I Solemnly Swear"	Stacey Oristano	March 30, 2015
Kevin's Rating: 7 Fish Chef Smocks; Demi's Rating: 7 Mystery Grab Bags; Guest Rating: 6 Whoa-oh's
60	"3.12 Lorelai Out of Water"	Lauren Lapkus	April 1, 2015
Kevin's Rating: 5 Makeup Hand Models; Demi's Rating: 5 Cat Hats; Guest Rating: 4 Arranged Marriages
61	"3.13 Dear Emily and Richard"	TBA	April 6, 2015
Kevin's Rating: 8 Sony Walkmans; Demi's Rating: 9 Pickles on the Side
62	"3.14 Swan Song"	Megan Amram	April 8, 2015
Kevin's Rating: 9 Swan-Killing Ladles; Demi's Rating: 6 Strobe Lights; Guest Rating: 8.5 Delia's Catalogs
63	"3.15 Face-Off"	TBA	April 13, 2015
Kevin's Rating: 7.5 Picasso Slides; Demi's Rating: 7 Quarters...oh, no no, I mean Periods
64	"3.16 The Big One"	Aisha Muharrar	April 15, 2015
Kevin's Rating: 8.5 Fireplaces that Jamie Lights; Demi's Rating: 9 Bulgarians in Speedos; Guest Rating: 10 Sewer Meals
65	"3.17 A Tale of Poes and Fire"	Louis Peitzman	April 20, 2015
Kevin's Rating: 7 Wal-Mart 'Employee of the Month' Plaques; Demi's Rating: 8 Oatmeals that Babette Ate; Guest Rating: 7 Cots
66	"3.18 Happy Birthday Baby"	TBA	April 22, 2015
Kevin's Rating: 8 Cheese Burns; Demi's Rating: 7 Spoons in the Disposal
67	"3.19 Keg! Max!"	Ben Siemon	April 27, 2015
Kevin's Rating: 9 Figurines that Kyle was Wrapping; Demi's Rating: 9 Oranges; Guest Rating: 8 Michelle Branch CD's
68	"3.20 Say Goodnight, Gracie"	Calum Worthy / John Paul Green	April 29, 2015
Kevin's Rating: 8 90-Degree Angled Necks; Demi's Rating: 6.5 Suffragette Cities; Guest Rating: 10 Coffee Sounds / 6 Jess Eye Rolls
69	"3.21 Here Comes the Son"	Allie Goertz	May 4, 2015
Kevin's Rating: 4 Duffel Bags Full of Leather Jackets; Demi's Rating: 4 Wizard of Oz Men Behind the Curtain; Guest Rating: 3 Hemp Hats
70	"3.22 Those are Strings, Pinocchio"	Jessica St. Clair	May 6, 2015
The first Gilmore Guys live show, recorded at the UCB Sunset Theater. Actress and self-professed Gilmore Girls superfan Jessica St. Clair joins the guys to gab about the season 3 finale. Regular guests Anthony Troli and Stacey Oristano make brief appearances from the audience. Kevin's Rating: 8.5 Emily Blue Skater Outfits; Demi's Rating: 10 Terrible Mold Inspections; Guest Rating: 9 Wolves that would be Released to Track those Deer

=== Season 4 ===
No.	Title	Guest	Original release date
71	"Gilmore Gab: Adam Wylie"	TBA	May 7, 2015
Adam Wylie joins the guys to talk about his recurring role as Brad Langford on Gilmore Girls, specifically noting how his role on the show mirrored his own life on Broadway.
72	"4.01 Ballrooms and Biscotti"	Jeff Hiller	May 11, 2015
Kevin's Rating: 7.864 Biscotti; Demi's Rating: 7 Fake Jams; Guest Rating: 6 Reprehensible Taylor Quotes
73	"4.02 The Lorelai's First Day at Yale"	Patrick Walsh	May 13, 2015
Kevin's Rating: 8 Coffee Kiosks by the Library; Demi's Rating: 9 Henry Box Brown Mattresses; Guest Rating: 7 "Oh My God!"s
74	"4.03 The Hobbit, the Sofa, and Digger Stiles"	Dominic Dierkes	May 18, 2015
Kevin's Rating: 7 Sword Dads; Demi's Rating: 7 Brazilian Waxes; Guest Rating: 7.5 Naked Guys in a Hallway
75	"Gilmore Gab: Scott Patterson"	TBA	May 20, 2015
Scott Patterson joins the guys to discuss his career from baseball to acting, and his starring role on Gilmore Girls as Luke.
76	"4.04 Chicken or Beef?"	Anthony Troli	May 25, 2015
Kevin's Rating: 9 Beefs; Demi's Rating: 8 Navy Outfits; Guest Rating: 9 Educated Rock Stars
77	"Gilmore Gab: Mara Casey & Jami Rudofsky"	TBA	May 27, 2015
The casting directors for Gilmore Girls, Mara Casey and Jami Rudofsky, join the guys to discuss the casting process throughout the run of the show. They talk about Melissa McCarthy's audition, and the search for the right Dean.
78	"4.05 The Fundamental Things Apply"	Louis Peitzman	June 1, 2015
Kevin's Rating: 6.8 Yankees Tickets; Demi's Rating: 6 All-New 2003 Toyota Priuses; Guest Rating: 6 Delicious Urine Mints
79	"4.06 An Affair to Remember"	Keith Powell	June 3, 2015
Kevin's Rating: 9 Broccoli Tarts; Demi's Rating: 7 Condoleeza Mailboxes; Guest Rating: 8 Trucker Magazines
80	"4.07 The Festival of Living Art"	Jamie Woodham	June 8, 2015
Kevin's Rating: 7 Pinot Renoirs; Demi's Rating: 9 Baby Paintings; Guest Rating: 7 Elephant Squirts
81	"Gilmore Gab: Jane Espenson"	TBA	June 10, 2015
Writer Jane Espenson joins Kevin and Demi to talk about her vast career as a writer/producer, and her role as a writer on Season 4 of Gilmore Girls.
82	"4.08 Die, Jerk"	Stacey Oristano	June 15, 2015
Kevin's Rating: 8 Cheeseburgers on Stands; Demi's Rating: 8 F-12 Buttons; Guest Rating: 8 Seth MacFarlane Cameos
83	"4.09 Ted Koppel's Big Night Out"	Paul Scheer	June 17, 2015
Kevin's Rating: 9 Whiffenpoofs; Demi's Rating: 7 Bloody Marys without Celery; Guest Rating: 8 Non-Alcoholic Flasks
84	"4.10 The Nanny and the Professor"	Brock Wilbur	June 22, 2015
Kevin's Rating: 7 Pizza Crusts that Lorelai eats off the Ground; Demi's Rating: 8 Baby Crepes; Guest Rating: 5 Closet Slams to Get Somebody's Attention
85	"4.11 in the Clamor and the Clangor"	D'Arcy Carden	June 24, 2015
Kevin's Rating: 8 Cancer Sticks; Demi's Rating: 9 Strokes Stickers; Guest Rating: 9 Culinary Institutes of America
86	"4.12 A Family Matter"	TBA	June 29, 2015
Kevin's Rating: 7 Ho-Chos; Demi's Rating: 8 To-Be-Trashed Bags of Pot
87	"Gilmail Guys Vol. 5"	TBA	July 1, 2015
Kevin and Demi respond to emails and voicemails sent in by fans of the podcast.
88	"4.13 Nag Hammadi Is Where They Found the Gnostic Gospels"	Sarah Ramos / Keiko Agena	July 6, 2015
In their first outing at [[ATX|ATX Television Festival]], the guys are joined by Gilmore Girls star Keiko Agena, and returning guest Sarah Ramos to gab about episode 413. They recap the Gilmore Girls ATX panel, chat about Rory's running style, and Keiko reveals who in the cast is least like the character they play. Kevin's Rating: 8 Kangol Beanies; Demi's Rating: 9 Etch-a-Sketches; Guest Rating: 6 Lorelai's New Hair Pieces / 8 Logans
89	"ATX Television Festival Recap Vol. 1"	TBA	July 8, 2015
The Guys recap their time at the ATX Television Festival. This includes clips of their red carpet interviews with Liza Weil, Danny Strong, Liz Torres, Jackson Douglas, Yanic Truesdale, Matt Czuchry, Keiko Agena, Todd Lowe, John Cabrera, Arielle Kebbel, and Milo Ventimiglia from the Gilmore Girls panel as well as a clip of Hep Alien's reunion performance.
90	"4.14 The Incredible Sinking Lorelais"	Sarah Ramos / Keiko Agena / Stacey Oristano	July 13, 2015
The episode opens with fan Brenda Szwejbka's Gilmore Guys parody of "American Pie". In their second live show at ATX, the guys talk about Lorelai and Dean's chemistry, how Demi sees salami when he looks at clothes, Gilmore Girls drinking games, and Michel's sexuality. Kevin's Rating: 9 Brokeback Mountain Coats; Demi's Rating: 9 Haircuts from Guys I Knew in Middle School; Guest Rating: 9 $30,000 Checks / 9 Socks / Sports Analogies
91	"ATX Television Festival Recap Vol. 2"	TBA	July 15, 2015
The Guys finish their recap of the ATX reunion, and Kevin has a mini 'Gilmore Gab' with Kelly Bishop at the festival.
92	"4.15 Scene in a Mall"	Alison Rosen	July 20, 2015
The guys welcome veteran podcaster Alison Rosen to gab about Emily's mall breakdown, Kirk's dog watcher skills, and Dean's pining for Rory. Recurring Bits: "Is This Homophobic?", "Barack Obama Couldn't Make It"; Kevin's Rating: 8.5 Globes with the Wrong Countries; Demi's Rating: 8 Beatles; Guest Rating: 6 Decorative Roses
93	"4.16 The Reigning Lorelai"	DC Pierson	July 22, 2015
The guys perform their second show at the UCB Sunset Theater with returning guest, DC Pierson. They discuss their delight in Kelly Bishop's performance in the episode, and Marion Ross's return as Marilyn, and pay tribute to the deceased character of Trix. Kevin's Rating: 10 Mojitos; Demi's Rating: 8 Fresh Underwears; Guest Rating: 10 Kirk Jesus Monologues
94	"4.17 Girls in Bikinis, Boys doin' the Twist"	Tara Copeland	July 27, 2015
Tara Copeland returns to the podcast to gab with the guys about episode 417. Discussion ranges from Madeline & Louise's beach behavior to the awkward dancing of background extras, and the use of live music on TV shows in the early 2000s. Kevin's Rating: 6 Giant Cue Tips; Demi's Rating: 7 Bed Exercises; Guest Rating: 8 Pink Raincoats
95	"4.18 Tick, Tick, Tick, Boom!"	Sean Clements	July 29, 2015
The guys welcome Sean Clements back to the show to discuss Michel's crush on Lindsay, the dynamic of Dean and Lindsay's relationship, and Richard's character development, while diving into a critical analysis of the show. Kevin's Rating: 9 Cars that look "Just Like Barbie's"; Demi's Rating: 8 Cigars; Guest Rating: 59 out of 300 Rotten Easter Eggs*
96	"4.19 Afterboom"	Ben Siemon	August 3, 2015
Ben Siemon returns to the podcast for the first episode on the Headgum network. The guys gab about Luke's lack of friends, the reasoning behind Lorelai's breakup with Digger, and the odd use of laughter on the show. Kevin's Rating: 7 Deer; Demi's Rating: 7 Cherry Pie Deanies; Guest Rating: 7 Breakfast Food Stamps
97	"Call Our Name Vol. 2"	TBA	August 5, 2015
Live Call-In Episode
98	"4.20 Luke Can See Her Face"	Aisha Muharrar / Sarah Heyward / Michael Ausiello	August 10, 2015
Recorded live at The Bell House in Brooklyn, New York. The guys are joined by returning guests Sarah Heyward and Aisha Muharrar, as well as long-time "gilly" Michael Ausiello to gab about the show. They discuss Luke's "on-switch" moment with self-help tapes, revisit "A Little to the Left", and admit that they say "Maybe" to the Jess. Kevin's Rating: 8 Zucchinis; Demi's Rating: 8.5 Casper Mattresses; Guest Rating: 7 Rock n' Roll Shirts / 7.5 Chow Mein Sandwiches / 8 Fatsos
99	"4.21 Last Week Fights, This Week Tights"	Aisha Muharrar / Mike Dicenzo / Mara Wilson	August 12, 2015
Recorded live at The Bell House in Brooklyn, New York. The guys welcome Aisha Muharrar, Mike Dicenzo, and Mara Wilson to the show to gab about Liz & TJ's wedding, Rory standing up to Jess, and everyone's love for Luke. Kevin's Rating: 9 Flower Crowns; Demi's Rating: 10 Yatzees I'm Winning; Guest Rating: 9.5 Tana Collages / 10 Air Pants / 9 Awkward Ties Thrown on at the Last Minute
100	"4.22 Raincoats and Recipes"	Jason Mantzoukas	August 17, 2015
Recorded live at the UCB Sunset Theater. Jason Mantzoukas returns to the show to gab about the season 4 finale. Kevin posits that this is one of the best episodes of the series because it is the culmination of many of the show's arcs and marks a shift in the series. They praise Lauren Graham's acting and the scene in which Lorelai Gilmore and Luke share their first kiss. They imagine what each couple on the show is like in bed. Kevin's Rating: 10 Condoms; Demi's Rating: 10 Recipes; Guest Rating: 10 Raincoats
101	"The Lost Scripts"	Wayne Wilcox	August 19, 2015
Wayne Wilcox (Marty on Gilmore Girls) joins the guys to read the "lost scripts" of Gilmore Girls. * First episode to be released in video format (on YouTube) as well as audio.

=== Season 5 ===
No.	Title	Guest	Original release date
102	"5.01 Say Goodbye to Daisy Miller"	Todd Buonopane	August 24, 2015
Broadway veteran Todd Buonopane joins the guys to discuss the Season 5 premiere. They gab about the anomaly of high shutter-speed in the first few episodes of season 5, the realism of Lane and Lorelai's reactions to Rory, and what would be a worse post-coital song than The Candy Man. Kevin's Rating: 8.5 Boas; Demi's Rating: 8.5 Glasses of Wine at Lunch; Guest Rating: 8.75 Matt Czuchry Gorgeous Faces
103	"Gilmail Guys Vol.6"	Alex Goldman	August 26, 2015
Kevin and Demi respond to emails and voicemails sent in by fans of the podcast with guest Alex Goldman.
104	"Gilmore Gab: Sean Gunn"	TBA	August 31, 2015
Sean Gunn joins the guys on the podcast to talk about his role as Kirk on Gilmore Girls.
105	"5.02 A Messenger, Nothing More"	Pamela Ribon	September 2, 2015
The guys welcome Pam Ribon to the show to gab about episode 5.02. They discuss the distinct flavor of a Daniel Palladino episode, the inherent difficulty in finding a match for any character played by Lauren Graham, and whether Lane & Zach's relationship makes sense. Kevin's Rating: 7 Borats; Demi's Rating: 7.5 Wink Winkers; Guest Rating: 7.5 Inappropriate Shoes for the Catacombs; Recurring Bits: "Daniel Palladino/Emily Bergl/Melissa McCarthy...We Love You, Come on the Show", Kevin's Melissa McCarthy Impression
106	"5.03 Written in the Stars"	TBA	September 7, 2015
Recorded live at the Sixth & I Historic Synagogue. The guys break down Logan's first impression on the show, Lorelai & Luke's first date, and their frustration at Rory's choices with Dean while acknowledging the growth of her character. They pitch a spin-off featuring Michel's secret romance with Lindsay following her divorce. Kevin's Rating: 10 Sniffies; Demi's Rating: 10 Masters and Commanders
107	"5.04 Tippecanoe and Taylor Too"	TBA	September 9, 2015
Recorded live at World Cafe Live in Philadelphia. Kevin & Demi discuss the uncomfortableness of Dean & Rory's relationship, as well as the trope of not realizing that you're in love with someone (Luke with Lorelai / Lane with Zack). Additionally, Demi makes his prediction for when Rory will join the Mile High Club. Kevin's Rating: 7 Whipped Cream Cans; Demi's Rating: 9 Jawns**
108	"Gilmore Gab: Liza Weil"	TBA	September 14, 2015
Liza Weil comes on the podcast to chat with the guys about her career as an actress from her role as Paris Gellar on Gilmore Girls to all of Shonda Rhimes' shows, including her current starring role as Bonnie Winterbottom on How to Get Away with Murder.
109	"5.05 We Got Us a Pippi Virgin"	Hrishikesh Hirway	September 16, 2015
Hrishikesh Hirway joins the guys to gab about episode 505. They break down the different characters' reactions to Dean & Rory's relationship, focusing particularly on how Luke handled himself and whether he was in the right. Demi compares Gilmore Girls to Eminem, they present a cut of some of Emily's best lines in the style of Sir Mix-a-Lot while unanimously praising Kelly Bishop's acting. Kevin's Rating: 8.5 "Pull It!"s; Demi's Rating: 8 Gum-Staining Toothpastes; Guest Rating: 8 Pippis
110	"5.06 Norman Mailer, I'm Pregnant!"	Allie Goertz	September 21, 2015
Allie Goertz returns to the podcast to gab with the guys about episode 506, with discussions ranging from Sherry's ridiculous behaviour, to whether Rory is a good journalist. The trio also debate Logan's merits and flaws, comparing and contrasting him with the previous character of Tristan. Kevin's Rating: 8 Iced teas Demi's Rating: 7 Stolen Flip-flops; Guest Rating: 8 Gorilla masks
111	"Gilmail Guys Vol. 7"	TBA	September 23, 2015
Kevin and Demi respond to emails and voicemails sent in by fans of the podcast with guest Alex Goldman.
112	"5.07 You Jump, I Jump, Jack"	Paul F. Tompkins	September 28, 2015
Recorded live at the UCB Sunset Theater. Veteran podcaster Paul F. Tompkins joins the guys to gab about the episode as they break down the Life & Death Brigade, suggest better secret societies, and discuss the unrealistic nature of the stunt the group performs. In addition, they compare Daniel and Amy's differing visions of Emily, and Paul tells Luke to turn his hat around. Kevin's Rating: 8 "E"s; Demi's Rating: 7.5 Unexplainable Max Ernst quotes Guest Rating: 5 Heart Sweaters * This episode was also released in video format on YouTube.
113	"5.08 The Party's Over"	Sarah Heyward	September 30, 2015
Sarah comes back to the podcast to discuss episode 5.08. They break down changes in Rory's hair and voice throughout the series, how much Rory and Lorelai's characters are affected by the men in their lives. Demi compares Logan to the Joker. Kevin's Rating: 7 Tiaras; Demi's Rating: 7.5 Escrows; Guest Rating: 8 Gray Sandwiches
114	"5.09 Emily Says 'Hello'"	Jamie Woodham	October 5, 2015
Jamie Woodham returns for his fifth appearance on the podcast. They praise the subtlety and continuity of Rebecca Rand Kirshner's writing for the episode, debate Marty's intentions with Rory and gab about the proper "Townie" to "Gilmore Girl" ratio on the show. Kevin's Rating: 10 Giant Scissors; Demi's Rating: 8.5 Refrigerated Batteries; Guest Rating: 9.5 Discussions of Feminism
115	"Gilmore Gab: Sheila Lawrence"	TBA	October 7, 2015
Writer Sheila Lawrence joins the guys to gab about her time as a writer on Gilmore Girls for seasons 2–4.
116	"5.10 But Not as Cute as Pushkin"	Annamarie Tendler	October 12, 2015
The guys welcome Annamarie Tendler to the podcast for the first time. The trio breaks down the arc of Rory's character from Chilton to Yale, and ponders where she gets her money. Meanwhile, they praise the new relationship of Paris and Doyle. Kevin's Rating: 6.5 Bathrobes; Demi's Rating: 6.5 Butt-Faced Miscreants; Guest Rating: 4 Annas in Pyjamas
117	"Gilmore Gab: Rose Abdoo"	TBA	October 12, 2015
Rose Abdoo joins the guys to talk about her diverse acting career, and her role as Gypsy on Gilmore Girls. She shares stories of learning to drive for a role, playing a senator on Scandal, and her portrayal of Gypsy as always having a crush on Lorelai.
118	"5.11 Women of Questionable Morals"	Guy Branum	October 19, 2015
Comedian Guy Branum joins the guys to discuss the episode, while breaking down the history of the dramedy and Ryan Murphy shows. They praise the storyline of Richard and Emily with the dog, criticize the abundant references to snow, and decide what they would have called the woman of "questionable morals". Kevin's Rating: 7 Adult Milk n' Cookies; Demi's Rating: 8 Hot Muttons; Guest Rating: 7 Unordered Pancakes
119	"Revival Talk"	TBA	October 19, 2015
An "Emergency Podcast" recorded and released on October 19, 2015 after Michael Ausiello broke the news on TVLine that Netflix and The WB had made a deal to revive Gilmore Girls on Netflix. Ausiello joins the guys via phone to talk about the revival.
120	"Gilmail Guys Vol. 8"	TBA	October 21, 2015
Kevin and Demi respond to emails and voicemails sent in by fans of the podcast.
121	"5.12 Come Home"	Allison Miller	October 26, 2015
The guys break down episode 5.12 with special guest Allison Miller. They discuss their reactions to Emily and Richard's reconciliation, Lorelai reading the entire "damn oven" manual in one night, and Zack and Mrs. Kim's overreactions to Lane's glasses. The group also proposes their theories for where Mr. Kim has been, suggesting that Mrs. Kim might have murdered him, that he was simply locked in the bathroom, or that he was part of a travelling carnival with whom Mrs. Kim was caught in a whirlwind romance wherein they never actually married. Kevin's Rating: 7.5 Car Bumpers that Richard Rear-Ended; Demi's Rating: 6 Locked Bathrooms; Guest Rating: 6 Wedding Dresses
122	"Call Our Name Vol. 3 – Moments"	TBA	October 28, 2015
Live call-in episode, wherein Kevin and Demi field calls about the fans' favorite and least-favorite moments on the show.
123	"5.13 Wedding Bell Blues"	Doug Benson	November 2, 2015
Recorded live at the UCB Sunset Theater. Fellow podcaster Doug Benson (Doug Loves Movies) joins the guys to discuss the 100th episode of Gilmore Girls. They break down Emily and Chris's out-of-character actions, Rory's proposition for Logan, and whom from the show would be their best man/maid of honor. *The show opens with regular guest Stacey Oristano singing Wedding Bell Blues. *Also released in video format on YouTube. Kevin's Rating: 8.5 Totsies; Demi's Rating: 10 "Shimmying down the Fire Escape"s; Guest Rating: 4 Crack Puppies
124	"Gilmore Gab: Yanic Truesdale"	TBA	November 4, 2015
Yanic Truesdale joins the guys to gab all about his career as an actor from French-Canadian sitcoms to his role as Michel Gerard on Gilmore Girls.
125	"5.14 Say Something"	Brock Wilbur	November 9, 2015
Recorded live at the Great American Music Hall in San Francisco. Comedian Brock Wilbur returns to the podcast to join the guys in discussing episode 514, which Demi proclaims to be the best episode of the series thus far. The trio picks which color ribbon they would wear, praise Lauren Graham's acting, and dissect Logan's dialogue with Rory at the end of the episode. Demi predicts when Luke and Lorelai will reconcile, and Kevin compares Rory becoming entitled to boiling a lobster. *Also released in video format on YouTube. Kevin's Rating: 9.5 Ribbons; Demi's Rating: 10 Franks; Guest Rating: 8 out of 8 Boiled Lobsters†
126	"5.15 Jews and Chinese Food"	Megan Amram	November 11, 2015
Megan Amram returns to the podcast (in baby form) to gab about episode 5.15. The trio discusses Rory's inappropriately intimate behavior with Marty and the expensive Chinese food, and ponder how the entire town knows about Luke's boat. They praise the kids' performances and pitch "SupercalifragiAmyShermanPalladino". In addition Megan suggests watching the show with the pretense that Lorelai and Rory are actually aliens that have learned 80% of human culture. Kevin's Rating: 9 Hard-to-Push Carts; Demi's Rating: 9 Oversized Chip Bags; Guest Rating: 8 Kathy Bates Skin Suits
127	"5.16 So...Good Talk"	Anthony Troli	November 16, 2015
Anthony Troli returns for the fifth time to discuss episode 5.16 and declare that he is firmly "Team Rory". The guys engage in a spirited debate over whether Logan is simply Tristan 2.0, and whether the writers handled Lane's storyline well. They discuss the anachronism of Rory being suddenly poor this episode, as well as her potentially out-of-character actions toward Emily, and Troli offers his thoughts on pregnancy. Kevin's Rating: 9 Netflix Discs; Demi's Rating: 8 Cheeseburger Dreams; Guest Rating: 7 'A Star is Born's
128	"Gilmail Guys Vol. 9"	Anthony Troli	November 18, 2015
Kevin and Demi respond to emails and voicemails sent in by fans of the podcast with guest Anthony Troli.
129	"5.17 Pulp Friction"	Ben Siemon	November 23, 2015
The guys welcome Ben Siemon back to break down episode 5.17 and pitch a Gilmore Girls musical. They compare Rory's current character to how she was in seasons 1–3, lament the lack of Paris and Doyle, discuss Logan's unredeeming traits. Kevin's Rating: 6 Palm Tree Shirts; Demi's Rating: 6 Red Cowboy Boots; Guest Rating: 6 Bowls of Cocoa Puffs; Note: Episode 5.17 was also recorded live with guest Patrick Walsh, but due to audio issues was rerecorded and released as a standard in-studio episode.
130	"5.17 Pulp Friction (2)"	Patrick Walsh	November 25, 2015
Recorded live at the UCB Sunset Theater. Patrick Walsh returns to the podcast to discuss episode 5.17. The guys lament the episode's meandering content, and recast Pulp Fiction with characters from Stars Hollow. Kevin's Rating: 6 Golden Robes*; Demi's Rating: 6 Dust Bowls*; Guest Rating: 6 Logan's Stupid Gold Rules; Note: Episode 5.17 was also recorded in-studio with guest Ben Siemon, see above.
131	"5.18 To Live and Let Diorama"	TBA	November 30, 2015
Kevin and Demi fly solo to review episode 5.18. The guys discuss the character of Sophie as a potential prototype for the unused character of "Daisy" (the diner owner), comparing her favorably to Luke. They praise the mannequin diorama, and the use of Lorelai's house as a "haven for misfits", pitch a Kirk & Kyle spin-off, and offer a point-by-point rebuttal of Dean's comments to Luke. Kevin's Rating: 5.5 Stealth Alex Borstein Cameos; Demi's Rating: 5 Dueling Mannequins
132	"Gilmail Guys Vol. 10"	Aisha Muharrar / Ben Epstein	December 2, 2015
Kevin responds to emails and voicemails sent in by fans of the podcast with guests Aisha Muharrar and Ben Epstein.
133	"5.19 But I'm a Gilmore"	Matt Mira	December 7, 2015
Veteran podcaster and longtime gilly Matt Mira joins the guys on the podcast. They discuss how Paris is the only character with a major arc throughout the course of the show, and agree that Mitchum Huntzberger was worth the buildup. Kevin's Rating: 8 Indonesian Coast Guards; Demi's Rating: 8 Bechamels; Guest Rating: 7 Available Dates in Richard's Date Book; Recurring Bits: Barack Obama Couldn't Make It
134	"Gilmail Guys Vol. 11"	Sarah Heyward	December 9, 2015
Reading listener emails and playing voicemails with guest Sarah Heyward. Kevin and Sarah delve into Season 7 analysis, the reasoning behind April Nardini, and what would be good pairing for tertiary Gilmore Girls characters.
135	"Gilmore Gab: Jackson Douglas"	TBA	December 14, 2015
The guys welcome Jackson Douglas to the podcast to discuss his recurring role as Jackson on Gilmore Girls, as well as his experiences directing episodes of the show.
136	"Gilmail Guys Vol. 12"	TBA	December 16, 2015
Kevin and Demi respond to emails and voicemails sent in by fans of the podcast. They discuss the possibility of new kids in the revival episodes, reassess their Team Dean, Jess, and Logan stances, and pitch the character of Tony (played by Adejuwigbe) as Rory's new love interest.
137	"5.20 How Many Kropogs to Cape Code?"	Jackie Kashian	December 21, 2015
Kevin and Demi are joined by comedian and fellow podcaster, Jackie Kashian to break down episode 5.20. They discuss the stupidity of Logan's prank, compare and contrast Logan with Lorelai, and ponder how Taylor could have possibly gotten stuck under a papier-mâché horse. The trio also notes that Rory took one of the first "selfies" on television, and that Mitchum Huntzberger feels evil without doing anything overtly bad. Kevin's Rating: 7 Kropogs; Demi's Rating: 7 Snap Peas; Guest Rating: 4 Kropogs
138	"5.21 Blame Booze and Melville"	Jason Mantzoukas	December 23, 2015
Mantzoukas returns to the podcast with a revised character pitch for Gilmore Girls Season 8 – his character comes to town, sleeps with Rory, Lorelai, and Emily (now that she is a grieving widow), and then falls in love with Lorelai. The guys discuss how the cold open is just one dick joke, their updated opinions on Logan, and the cartoonish sauna scene. Jason pitches a Gilmore Girls / Arrested Development / Daredevil / Bunheads crossover with Willow & Tara from Buffy. Kevin's Rating: 8 Stories to cover the woman Logan was flirting with on the boat Demi's Rating: 6 Bowls of Porridge; Guest Rating: 7 Kirk's chests Episode also released on YouTube
139	"5.22 A House is not a Home"	Aisha Muharrar	December 28, 2015
Aisha Muharrar makes her 6th appearance on the podcast to discuss the Season 5 finale. They give high praise to Mrs. Kim's return and the mention of her "all-girl tambourine band", while pointing out the ridiculousness of Luke's big bat. The guys also note how both Lorelai and Rory are making major decisions based on their extreme emotional state, and how the actions of both can be directly attributed to how they were raised by their respective mothers. Kevin also announces that he is no longer "Team Logan", while Demi announces that he is, as a result of this episode. Kevin's Rating: 10 Cyclists' Butts; Demi's Rating: 8 Frightened Maids a'Milking; Guest Rating: 8.5 Westons; Best/Worst Episodes of the Season: Kevin's Best: 5.09 – "Emily Says Hello", Kevin's Worst: 5.17 – "Pulp Friction"; Demi's Best: 5.13 – "Wedding Bell Blues", Demi's Worst: 5.17 – "Pulp Friction"
140	"Not 5.06"	Pete Holmes	December 31, 2015
Comedian Pete Holmes joins the guys to discuss everything except episode 5.06. They break down the world of podcasting, Kevin pitches his Christian Bail podcast, and Pete compares Gilmore Girls to caffeine that you can't have before bed.

=== Season 6 ===
No.	Title	Guest	Original release date
141	"6.01 New and Improved Lorelai"	Chris Cubas	January 18, 2016
*Recorded live at the Texas Theater in Dallas. Comedian Chris Cubas joins Kevin and Demi to discuss the first episode of season 6. They declare Paris to be the new moral center of the show, and Demi reaffirms that Logan is growing on him, while Chris breaks down white privilege by looking at Richard and Emily. All three guys also declare themselves to be "Team Judge" as she is the only voice of reason in the episode, and Chris reminds the audience that you "don't steal a yacht." Kevin's Rating: 8 Richard Gold Chains; Demi's Rating: 7 Giant Chairs; Guest Rating: 120 out of 165 Morning Danishes†
142	"6.02 Fight Face"	Bailey De Young	January 20, 2016
Kevin and Demi are joined by actress Bailey De Young (Ginny on Bunheads) to discuss episode 6.02. They explore the different perspectives of Rory and Lorelai's fight, debate the ramifications of Amy Sherman-Palladino leaving the show, and discuss the many aspects of Star Wars. Kevin's Rating: 8 MP3 Players; Demi's Rating: 9 Roof Frisbee; Guest Rating: 7.5 TJ Shelves
143	"6.03 The UnGraduate"	Carina Mackenzie	January 25, 2016
Television writer Carina Mackenzie joins the guys to break down the third episode of season six. The trio discusses how the show is different whenever Rory and Lorelai are apart, and whether Paul Anka is supposed to represent Rory in Lorelai's life. They also touch on Luke's tenderness with Paul Anka and discuss his many good qualities. Kevin's Rating: 8 Packages of Baking Chocolate; Demi's Rating: 7 Mystic Hammers; Guest Rating: 6 Brown Sugar Pop Tarts
144	"6.04 Always a Godmother, Never a God"	Retta	January 27, 2016
Parks and Recreation star, Retta comes on the podcast to discuss the episode with Kevin and Demi. They gab about Zack's riff, their dislike of the milkmaid storyline, as well as the reference to Riding the Bus with My Sister, and wonder where Jackson's family is from. Kevin's Rating: 6.5 Bolo Ties; Demi's Rating: 5 Sisterly Bus Rides; Guest Rating: 5 Eggplants
145	"6.05 We've Got Magic to Do"	Sarah Ramos / Sarah Heyward	February 1, 2016
Sarah Ramos and Sarah Heyward return to the podcast to break down episode 6.05 with Kevin and Demi. They discuss whether Mitchum Huntzberger is wrong in what he says or if the show is just painting him as a villain and delve into the complexity of his character. They delight in Paris' sudden Marxism, and discuss how Richard's list of Rory's accomplishments is ridiculously unrealistic. Demi admits that his opinion of Emily has changed for the worse, and explains how to Krump. Kevin's Rating: 9 Andrews Sisters; Demi's Rating: 7 Crushed Girls; Guest Rating: 10 Emily's Glass of White Wine / 9 Wendy Malicks
146	"Gilmore Gab: Liz Torres"	TBA	February 3, 2016
Liz Torres (Patricia "Ms. Patty" Lacosta") joins the guys to discuss her decades-spanning career in show business. She fills them in on "wasbands", how her whisper could "stun a horse", and how she flirted with Ed Herrmann.
147	"Revival Talk: Volume 2"	Brock Wilbur	February 8, 2016
Brock rejoins the guys to talk through all of the news and interviews revolving around the series revival, following the official announcement from Netflix. They discuss Amy Sherman-Palladino's interviews, the timeline of events that led up to the revival, and speculate on where they expect certain characters to be.
148	"6.06 Welcome to the Dollhouse"	Jamie Woodham	February 10, 2016
Jamie Woodham returns for his 6th appearance on the podcast, in what Demi refers to as a "goofy little episode". They discuss Rory's complacency toward returning to school, Emily's "aroused" reaction to the Birkin bag, and criticize the premise of changing all of the street names in a town at once. Kevin, Demi, and Jamie then pitch their characters for the revival as Mr. Kim, Rory's husband Tony, and Michel's son Pepé. Kevin's Rating: 5 Tootsie Rolls; Demi's Rating: 5 Birkin bags Guest Rating: 5 Silly Rabbits (Speed Limits are for Kids)
149	"Gilmail Guys Vol. 13"	Jamie Woodham	February 15, 2016
Kevin and Demi respond to emails and voicemails sent in by fans of the show, with special guest Jamie Woodham. The trio discusses questions revolving around repetitive storylines, whether their parents ever "replaced" them with a pet (as Lorelai did with Paul Anka), and who should play Rory's new boyfriend in the revival.
150	"6.07 Twenty-One is the Loneliest Number"	TBA	February 17, 2016
Recorded live at The Showbox in Seattle. Kevin and Demi celebrate the official revival announcement while breaking down episode 6.07. They praise the performances of Graham, Bishop, and Herrmann, as well of the power couple of Paris and Doyle. Demi admits that he loves "The Rory", and Kevin gives everyone a PSA on abstinence. Kevin's Rating: 10 Dollhouse Tops; Demi's Rating: 9.5 Pearl Cakes
151	"6.08 Let Me Hear Your Bailalaikas Ringing Out"	Caitlin Weierhauser	February 22, 2016
Recorded live at the Aladdin Theater in Portland. Comedian Caitlin Weierhauser joins the guys to break down the return of Jess. They discuss his great character growth, how he and Rory make each other better people by not being together, and how Logan's behavior becomes almost cartoonishly villainous for the purpose of providing contrast. They revisit the use of Paul Anka as a metaphor for Rory, and examine Luke's compulsive "dad" behavior, while Kevin demonstrates what he has learned from watching Magic Mike XXL. Kevin's Rating: 8.5 Sexy Sexy Printing Presses; Demi's Rating: 9 Subsects; Guest Rating: 8 Turkey basters
152	"6.09 The Prodigal Daughter Returns"	Hrishikesh Hirway	February 29, 2016
Hrishikesh returns to the podcast for the episode he views as the end of the series. The trio praise the character of Lane, comparing her to a slow cooker (in an analogy where Lorelai and Rory are microwaves), while comparing Zack to the beginning boyfriend in a Romcom who is gotten rid of after the first act. They point out that the Gilmores couldn't possibly afford to buy a plane, and while the episode provides emotional comfort, the conflict between Lorelai and Rory isn't resolved. They break down the introduction of April, describing her as a combination of Lorelai and Rory. Kevin's Rating: 8.5 Cumbersome Bike Helmets; Demi's Rating: 7 Gulfstream Jets; Guest Rating: 9 Beef Rubs
153	"6.10 He's Slippin' 'Em Bread...Dig?"	Ian Karmel	March 7, 2016
Recorded live at The Regent Theatre in Los Angeles. Comedian Ian Karmel joins the guys to break down episode 6.10. They debating the merits of adding the character of April, as well as the suddenness of Christopher's reversal of fortune. They debate whether Rory is in the right for rejecting Emily and Richard's tuition money. They criticize Luke's handling of the April situation. They dive into Zack's breakdown at the Hep Alien show, and explore the overall tragedy of Lane's character throughout the show. Kevin's Rating: 6.5 Lifehouse Songs; Demi's Rating: 5 Hand Turkeys on the Wall April; Guest Rating: 7 Castles in Ireland
154	"Gilmore Gab: Michael Winters"	TBA	March 14, 2016
Michael Winters joins the guys to talk about his recurring role as Stars Hollow Town Selectman Taylor Doose on the show, and how he balanced that role with his active career on the stage.
155	"6.11 The Perfect Dress"	Brandi Brown	March 21, 2016
Recorded live at The Women's Club in Minneapolis, Minnesota. Comedian Brandi Brown joins the guys to break down The Perfect Dress, which they all decide was particularly unflattering. They give high praise to Paris and Doyle while dubbing Anna Nardini "Lorelai Beta". They also call out the show's odd attitude towards therapy, and voice their conspiracy theories concerning the significance of the date June 3. Kevin's Rating: 7 Intelligent Designs; Demi's Rating: 6.5 Angel Fire DNA Kits; Guest Rating: 6.5 out of 10
156	"Gilmail Guys Vol. 14"	TBA	March 23, 2016
Kevin and Demi respond to emails and voicemails sent in by fans of the show.
157	"6.12 Just Like Gwen and Gavin"	Jo Feldman	March 28, 2016
Recorded live at Thalia Hall in Chicago, Illinois. Second City comedian Jo Feldman joins the guys to discuss "Just Like Gwen and Gavin." They break down Luke's extreme reaction in cancelling the wedding, and Logan's 'stalking' Rory to get her back. Additionally they attribute peoples' hatred of April to what the addition of her character changes in Luke. Kevin's Rating: 7 Velour Robes; Demi's Rating: 7 Flowers for Algernon; Guest Rating: 7 Absurd Bike Helmets
158	"6.13 Friday Night's Alright for Fighting"	Ross Kimball	March 30, 2016
Recorded live at Thalia Hall in Chicago, Illinois. Actor and comedian Ross Kimball joins the guys for their second show in Chicago. They ponder the contents of Lorelai's notes, whether this episode redeems Logan as a character, and whether more creative directing would benefit the series as a whole. They question the buildup to Paris's breakdown, but praise Liza Weil's acting, and all three concur that the ending scene is one of the best of the series. Kevin's Rating: 10 Excellent Sorbets; Demi's Rating: 10 Darn Yo-Yos; Guest Rating: 10 Sookie's on the Case Hats
159	"The Entourage Entourage 69th Episode Spectacular"	Jake Hurwitz / Amir Blumenfeld	April 1, 2016
Jake and Amir join the guys for their April 1 adventure recapping the 69th episode of the television show Entourage.
160	"6.14 You've Been Gilmored"	Emily Heller	April 4, 2016
Demi lavishes praise on the character of Paris, especially her resignation speech in the newsroom. He lobbies for a spin-off that follows Paris's mental breakdown. The trio considers Emily's subtle manipulation tactics and Lorelai's treatment of Emily and Richard. Guest Emily Heller criticizes the way in which Lorelai and Rory approach their romantic relationships. They discuss what kind of man would be right for Rory. They debate Michel's sexuality and consider how the show approaches it. Kevin's Rating: 6 Xbox 360s Demi's Rating: 7 Meatball Pizzas; Guest Rating: 5 (3 out of 6) Caeser Haircuts
161	"Gilmore Gab: Grant-Lee Phillips"	TBA	April 6, 2016
Grant-Lee Phillips joins the guys to discuss his long career in music, and his role as The Town Troubadour on Gilmore Girls.
162	"6.15 A Vineyard Valentine"	Sarah Heyward	April 11, 2016
Sarah Heyward returns for her 6th episode of the podcast to discuss A Vineyard Valentine with the guys. They praise the confrontation between Mitchum and Logan, but Kevin and Demi otherwise declare it to be one of their least favorite episodes while Sarah defends it from a storytelling perspective – particularly how it shows the changes in the core relationship between Rory and Lorelai since the start of the series. Kevin's Rating: 2 Tennis Bracelets; Demi's Rating: 2 Lobsters; Guest Rating: 5 Potato Masher / Waffle Shapers
163	"6.16 Bridesmaids Revisited"	Hank Green	April 13, 2016
The trio questions the rationale of Zach's sudden proposal and conclude that the proposal scene is one of the saddest moments in Lane's storyline. They compare Lorelai's relationship with Christopher and her relationship with Luke. They consider Lorelai Gilmore's role in her family and community. They all decry Logan's actions and manipulation of Rory. Kevin's Rating: 7 Pompous Princeton Men; Demi's Rating: 7 Unfinished Jars of Maraschino Cherries; Guest Rating: 8 Unexplained Interests in Sonic Youth
164	"6.17 I'm OK, You're OK"	Ben Epstein	April 18, 2016
The trio expresses their disappointment that two strong characters such as Rory and Lorelai are so passive in this episode. They all agree that Lane's storyline is depressing, but that they enjoyed Zach's interactions with Mrs. Kim. They decide that Lorelai's treatment of her parents is unwarranted. Kevin's Rating: 6 Czuchry Hand Gestures; Demi's Rating: 8 Krav Maga Kama Sutras; Guest Rating: 6 Nardini Tee Shirts
165	"6.18 The Real Paul Anka"	Allison Miller	April 18, 2016
The trio expresses their delight over the opening dream sequence, noting how the show is experimenting in cinematic styles in this season. They praise the scenes of conflict between Rory and Logan. They commend the show for developing April as a distinctive character rather than just a plot device. Kevin and Demi debate whether Emily's actions in this episode are consistent with her character. They all agree that they loved Jess in his last appearance of the series, particularly his interaction with Luke. Kevin's Rating: 7 Cool Poetry Readings; Demi's Rating: 9 Quick Changes; Guest Rating: 8 Pot Holes
166	"6.19 I Get A Sidekick Out of You"	Matt Mira	April 25, 2016
The trio determines who each character would vote for in the 2016 United States presidential election. They debate whether Lane should have been more of a central figure at her wedding. In an effort to explain Mrs. Kim's unfortunate view on sex, Demi posits that she is a closeted lesbian. They compare and contrast Lorelai's relationship with Christopher and her relationship with Luke. They praise the interaction between Lane and Mrs. Kim after the two weddings. Kevin's Rating: 9 Big Buddhas; Demi's Rating: 6 Tequila Shots; Guest Rating: 4 Dick Cookies
167	"Gilmore Gab: Milo Ventimiglia"	Matt Mira	April 27, 2016
Milo Ventimiglia stops by to discuss his career.
168	"6.20 Super Cool Party People"	Anthony Troli	May 2, 2016
Kevin, Demi, and guest Anthony Troli delight in Miss Patty and Paris's acts of friendship toward Lorelai and Rory, respectively. They commend the show's ability to create nuanced characters that develop over the course of the series. They also praise the conflict between Lorelai and Anna and decide that both characters are in the right. Kevin's Rating: 8.5 Peepholes; Demi's Rating: 9.5 Lipsmackers; Guest Rating: 9 Logan's Broken Legs
169	"6.21 Driving Miss Gilmore"	Jason Mantzoukas	May 4, 2016
Kevin, Demi, and Jason Mantzoukas debate whether Emily is manipulating Lorelai to get her back together with Christopher. They point out the show's parallels with Star Wars: The Force Awakens and Game of Thrones. They propose a number of spin-offs focusing on supporting characters. Kevin's Rating: 8 Bags of Weed; Demi's Rating: 8 Ashley Simpson Haircuts; Guest Rating: (No Rating Given)
170	"6.22 Partings"	Aisha Muharrar	May 9, 2016
Kevin, Demi, and Aisha discuss whether the character of April is the sitcom version of Rory. They question whether marriage would take the interest out of Luke and Lorelai's relationship. They break down Lorelai's impromptu therapy session, and whether she received good advice. They debate the good and bad points of Christopher. Kevin's Rating: 10 Flawless Accents; Demi's Rating: 8 Patti's Ex-Husbands; Guest Rating: 5 Adrianas
171	"Gilmore Gab: Scott Patterson Returns!"	TBA	May 11, 2016
Patterson returns to the podcast to chat with Kevin about the revival, his musical endeavors, and Bruce Springsteen.
172	"Gilmore Gab: Keiko Agena"	TBA	May 16, 2016
Keiko Agena joins the guys to talk about Gilmore Girls, the Drunk Monk Podcast, and her varied acting/improv career.
173	"Gilmail Vol. 15 – What was the Question?"	TBA	May 18, 2016
Kevin and Demi respond to listener emails and voicemails, and discuss their reactions to Captain America: Civil War.

=== Season 7 ===
No.	Title	Guest	Original release date
174	"7.01 The Long Morrow"	Jamie Woodham	May 23, 2016
Jamie Woodham returns to the podcast to discuss the first episode of season 7, the first episode after the show creator Amy Sherman-Palladino parted ways with the series. They discuss the changing tone, pace, and dialogue under new showrunner David S. Rosenthal, and talk about how new show runners have affected other popular TV shows. The guys discuss how they don't hate the new season as much as they thought, and are curious to see how it changes as it goes on. Kevin's Rating: 4 Racquetballs; Demi's Rating: 6.5 Taylor Ts; Guest Rating: 3 Twilight Zone References
175	"7.02 That's What You Get Folks, for Makin' Whoopee"	Ben Siemon	May 25, 2016
Recurring guest Ben Siemon rejoins the guys to discuss the second episode of season 7. They discuss how the show (even with the original showrunner) punishes women's sexuality and the tragic tale of Lane Kim. The guys also grapple with the extreme racism found in this episode towards Asian Culture. Ben posits that the last four words will be something along the lines of "I love-" interrupted with "I know". Demi pitches new scenes for the revival season on Netflix. Kevin's Rating: 3 Whoa Big Buddhas; Demi's Rating: 4 Pictures of Sandra Oh; Guest Rating: 5 Tuna Loaves
176	"7.03 Lorelai's First Cotillion"	Julia Prescott	May 30, 2016
The guys discuss the importance of Pop-Tarts in the Gilmore Girls mythos, how Rory does not understand how phones work, and the new writers trying to reach for thematic importance and relevance with the new season. Pop Culture Plugs: Kevin- Neighbors 2, Demi- The Nice Guys, guest- Lady Dynamite; Kevin's Rating: 6 Corsages; Demi's Rating: 7.5 Baby Hoses; Guest Rating: 6 Corsages
177	"Gilmail Vol. 16 – Low Maintenance Pod"	TBA	June 1, 2016
The guys respond to listener emails and voicemails, with help from Buster the Dog.
178	"7.04 'S'Wonderful S'Marvelous"	Ross Kimball	June 6, 2016
The guys talk about dates and planning dates, as well as sing several songs throughout the episode. They also spend a lot of time referencing the Air Bud movies, and Demi raps about Chili's to the tune of Macklemore. The guys also discuss if the changing personalities of the characters is emblematic of an intentional choice from the writers, or if the writers simply don't understand how to write them effectively without Amy Sherman-Palladino at the helm. Ross guesses the final four words will be "I love you, too". Kevin's Rating: 5.5 Twizzlers; Demi's Rating: 7 Dirty Projectors; Guest Rating: 7 Half-melted Slushies
179	"7.05 The Great Stink"	Anthony Troli	June 8, 2016
Kevin and Demi are joined by Anthony Troli to talk about the Chili's restaurant, and mourn the loss of an episode recording with guest Anthony Troli for the previous episode. They talk about the differences between Christopher Hayden and Luke, and debate if season 7 is turning the Gilmore Girls into ciphers for the men in their lives. They also posit that several plotlines from season 7 are simple retreads of earlier plotlines, and wonder if the writers are purposely trying to mirror, or if it is lazy writing. Anthony guesses the final four words will be "I'll have coffee, black". Kevin's Rating: 5 Pickles; Demi's Rating: 6.5 Websites; Guest Rating: 4 Chili's
180	"7.06 Go Bulldogs!"	Matt Mira	June 13, 2016
Kevin and Demi are joined by Matt Mira, who guesses that the final four words will be "No Rory, that's stupid." They determine that a weak plot makes this a subpar episode. They acknowledge that the seventh season seems to be trying to redeem Christopher's past actions. Kevin's Rating: 3 a cappella groups Demi's Rating: 6 cafe au laits Guest Rating: 2 creme brulee
181	"Gilmail Vol. 17 – Cast Our Guests"	Matt Mira	June 20, 2016
Kevin and Demi respond to listener emails and voicemails, and cast all of the podcast guests as residents of Stars Hollow.
182	"Gilmore Gab: Louise Goffin"	TBA	June 22, 2016
Louise Goffin joins the guys to talk through her career as a singer/songwriter, and how she and her mother (Carole King) came to sing the theme for Gilmore Girls.
183	"7.07 French Twist"	TBA	June 27, 2016
Kevin and Demi live in Boston! They discuss the distortion of time when Lorelai and Christopher Hayden are in Paris, France and the rare funny moments in Lane's storyline. Kevin's Rating: 3.5 M&M's; Demi's Rating: 7 pizza slices in pockets Guest Rating: N/A
184	"7.08 Introducing Lorelai Planetarium"	Brock Wilbur	June 27, 2016
The guys discuss why the podcasts episodes run so long, and decide the season would be much better if April became a belligerent angry child instead of annoying. They also discuss how this show now resembles two separate sitcoms- one starring Luke and his daughter, the other starring Lorelai and Christopher. They question Rory's reaction to her parents' impulsive marriage. Brock guesses that the final four words are "Where is CiCi's Pizza?"; Kevin's Rating: 5 exploding appendix Demi's Rating: 7 quartz Timex; Guest Rating: 4 snails
185	"Gilmail Vol 18- Stefon Goes to Stars Hollow"	TBA	July 4, 2016
The guys respond to listener emails and voicemails.
186	"7.09 Knit, People, Knit"	Alice Wetterlund	July 6, 2016
The guys talk about the differences between Christopher and Luke, and discuss why this season feels different for most people from the first six seasons. Demi disagrees and actually enjoys the season. Alice does numerous impressions and they all sing several songs. Ben Schwartz briefly drops by and the group discusses dogs. Alice, while clarifying that this is a "joke suggestion," predicts that the final four words will be "Luke or Christopher - which??" Kevin's Rating: 4 giant knitting needles Demi's Rating: 7 wheat beers Guest Rating: 3 Uggs
187	"7.10 Merry Fisticuffs"	Allie Goertz	July 10, 2016
The guys talk about the sudden character changes in this episode and speculate it might be a result of the director's choice and the writers attempting to move a story along abruptly. They consider the character of Anna and speculate over her past relationship with Luke. Demi expresses his opinion that Lorelai isn't as funny in this episode while Kevin believes that she has been less funny all season. Allie posits that it is because Lorelai isn't feeling like herself. They criticize Christopher Hayden's manipulation of Lorelai. Kevin argues that the fight scene between Luke and Christopher is antithetical to Gilmore Girls, while Allie argues that there are greater nuances within the fight. The trio debates whether Logan did the right thing by telling Lucy that Rory and Marty already knew each other. They also complain that this was a bad ending for the character of Marty. Allie posits that the final four words will be "Are you sure?" "Yes." They read submissions of the final four words from Twitter users. Kevin's Rating: 2.5 incompetent lawyers Demi's Rating: 4.5 fritatas Guest Rating: 5.5 "boyfriend"s
188	"Gilmore Gab: Emily Kuroda"	TBA	July 13, 2016
Actress Emily Kuroda joins the guys to discuss her long acting career, including her time as Mrs. Kim on Gilmore Girls, and compare cameras with Kevin.
189	"7.11 Santa's Secret Stuff"	Hrishikesh Hirway	July 18, 2016
Fellow podcaster, Hrishikesh Hirway joins the guys to discuss episode 7.11, discuss music, and debate the handling of Lane's pregnancy storyline. Kevin predicts that the final four words will be "Well, too bad, kid." Kevin's Rating: 7 Bad Child Actors; Demi's Rating: 8 Cookies by Scratching; Guest Rating: 7.4 Christmas Sweaters, or Microscopes, or Magnification Scale through the Microscope
190	"Gilmail Vol. 19 – Guess Who's Coming to Stars Hollow"	TBA	July 25, 2016
The guys respond to listener emails and voicemails, while attempting to recast all of the residents of Stars Hollow.
191	"7.12 To Whom It May Concern"	Jessica McKenna	August 1, 2016
Demi, Kevin, and Jessica break down conflicts between Lorelai and Christopher and Luke and Anna. They also discuss Rory's potentially troubling lack of social skills, and whether her passivity is based upon her upbringing and her ease of getting whatever she needed from the Stars Hollow community. The gang expresses surprise that the show is rehashing plotlines about Sookie's pregnancy and Richard's illness. Additionally, Demi and Kevin explicitly state that they do not want to see any pre-revival content before Gilmore Girls: A Year in the Life drops on Netflix. Jessica guesses that the final four words will be "You were actually adopted." Kevin's Rating: 7 Shattering Glasses of Water to Illustrate that a Heart Attack is Happening to Richard Gilmore in a Classroom Scene in Front of his Granddaughter Rory; Demi's Rating: 5 Muffin-Bottom Pies; Guest Rating: 6 Rory Nonexistent Friends
192	"Gilmail Vol. 21 - Skipping 20 for No Reason!"	Ben Siemon	August 8, 2016
193	"7.13 I'd Rather Be In Philadelphia"	Myles McNutt	August 15, 2016
Demi and Kevin sit down with actual doctor Myles McNutt, and they bring up how Richard's plotline is too similar to "Forgiveness and Stuff" from Season 1. They bring up Emily's unfocused arc in the episode, as well as in the season as a whole. The group also points out how the male partners of Lorelai and Rory and their potential usurpers are always pulled into a distinct binary of good choice vs. bad choice, even when that requires a revamping of the male characters. They credit Babette's active role in the episode as a good example of rounding out a recurring actor. Myles does not predict specific final four words, but he believes they will be clever and resonant about the connection between Rory and Lorelai, if not monumental. Kevin's Rating: 4.5 Starkist Tuna Cans; Demi's Rating: 5 Milk Duds; Guest Rating: 5.5
194	"7.14 Farewell, My Pet"	Stacey Oristano	August 22, 2016
Stacey returns after filming a part in Gilmore Girls: A Year in the Life, but she steadfastly does not reveal details about the production. The gang discusses the three big arguments between Lorelai and Christopher which wear down Christopher's likability. Despite differences in how they view Lorelai's feelings about Christopher and Luke as portrayed throughout the season, they all find the resolution of the Lorelai-Christopher tête-à-tête very satisfying. Stacey, who did not see the final four words during filming, surmises that they could be "It was always you." Kevin's Rating: 6.9 Photoshopped Dog Pictures; Demi's Rating: 8 Hamburgers for Chin Chin; Guest Rating: 7 Open Hospital Gowns Showing Buttcrack
195	"Gilmail Vol. 22 - Guy on Guys"	Guy Branum	August 29, 2016
196	"7.15 I'm A Kayak, Hear Me Roar"	Erin Whitehead	September 5, 2016
Kevin's Rating: 7.5 Unnecessarily Fancy Desserts That Logan is Served; Demi's Rating: 7.5 Fishy Fishes; Guest Rating: 5.5
197	"Gilmore Gab: David Sutcliffe"	TBA	September 12, 2016
Actor David Sutcliffe joins the guys.
198	"Gilmail Vol. 23 - Lorelai is Cheesecake Factory"	TBA	September 19, 2016
199	"7.16 Will You Be My Lorelai Gilmore"	Mara Wilson	September 26, 2016
Kevin's Rating: 6.5 Bald Men in New York City; Demi's Rating: 8.5 Manhattan Apartment Fireplaces; Guest Rating: 6 April Science Posters
200	"7.17 Gilmore Girls Only"	Alice Wetterlund	October 3, 2016
Kevin, Demi, and Alice Wetterlund gab in Toronto. They compare the actress who played Mia in season two to the actress who played her in this episode. Kevin praises Emily's fish-out-of-water situation as well as the lack of clear resolution between her and Lorelai. They express disappointment in Richard's last story line. They speculate why Rory is not a good journalist and propose alternative career paths for her. They note the unusual use of laughter in the seventh season. They question why Logan went all the way to North Carolina to apologize to Rory, but agree that Rory handled the situation well. Kevin's Rating: 7.5 Mixtapes; Demi's Rating: 6 Terrible Poems; Guest Rating: 8.5 Sexy Velour Tracksuits
201	"7.18 Hay Bale Maze"	Chris Cubas	October 10, 2016
Kevin, Demi, and Chris Cubas discuss the tension between Lorelai and Logan while noting the similarities and differences in their backgrounds. Kevin compares Logan to Christian Grey. They criticize the obviousness of the hay bale maze metaphor and the lack of subtlety in Lorelai and Luke's apology scene. Kevin's Rating: 6.2 ProJos; Demi's Rating: 6 Nuts and More; Guest Rating: 6 Privileged White Girls
202	"7.19 It's Just Like Riding a Bike"	Sarah Heyward	October 17, 2016
Kevin's Rating: 6.5 Rejection Letters from the New York Times Fellowship; Demi's Rating: 7 Broken Dollhouses; Guest Rating: 6 Lucky Letter Openers
203	"7.19 It's Just Like Riding a Bike"	TBA	October 20, 2016
Live in Boulder, Colorado. They speculate on the use of metaphors in season seven. Demi argues that the episode could benefit from seeing from Luke's point-of-view. They praise the bickering between Luke and Lorelai, especially Lauren Graham's acting. They criticize the fight between Sookie and Jackson. They praise the scene between Paris and Rory as well as the decision to have Rory get rejected by The New York Times. Kevin's Rating: 6 Galinda Apartments; Demi's Rating: 7 Pauls
204	"7.20 Lorelai? Lorelai?"	TBA	October 24, 2016
Live in Nashville. Kevin and Demi praise the dream sequence in the episode. They discuss the culmination of Lane's sad story arc. They criticize the lack of subtlety of Lorelai singing I Will Always Love You to Luke, but praise Lauren Graham's acting. Kevin's Rating: 7 Kirk Gleason Cult Meetings; Demi's Rating: 8 Unwanted Proposals
205	"7.21 Unto the Breach"	Jason Mantzoukas	October 31, 2016
Jason Mantzoukas helps break down why season seven seems so different from the preceding six seasons. They criticize Logan's disregard for Rory's wants. They agree that Paris and Doyle have the healthiest relationship on the show. They propose a series of inappropriate hashtags for the audience to use. Kevin's Rating: 7 Inside Out Ties; Demi's Rating: 7.5 Trippy Necklaces; Guest Rating: 3 Tracings of d**ks
206	"The Popfest Countdown Show!"	Ross Kimball / Sean Gunn	November 7, 2016
207	"7.22 Bon Voyage - Part I"	Aisha Muharrar	November 14, 2016
208	"7.22 Bon Voyage - Part II"	Aisha Muharrar	November 14, 2016
209	"Pizza Party! - Gilmail 37"	Aisha Muharrar / Anthony Troli	November 21, 2016

=== A Year in the Life ===
No.	Title	Guest	Original release date
210	"A Year in the Life - Reactions!"	Ross Kimball / Brock Wilbur	November 28, 2016
211	"Winter"	Guy Branum / Hrishikesh Hirway	December 5, 2016
212	"Spring"	Alice Wetterlund	December 12, 2016
213	"Summer"	Jason Mantzoukas	December 19, 2016
214	"Fall"	Sarah Heyward / Aisha Muharrar	December 26, 2016
215	"Gilmore Gabs: Vanessa Marano"	Vanessa Marano	January 2, 2017
216	"Gilmail Vol. 46 - A Year in Voice Memos & Bunheads Prep"	Matt Mira / Ben Siemon	January 9, 2017

=== Bunheads ===
No.	Title	Guest	Original release date
217	"1.01 Pilot"	Ben Schwartz	January 16, 2017
218	"1.02 For Fanny"	Patrick Walsh	January 23, 2017
219	"1.03 Inherit the Wind"	Louis Peitzman	January 30, 2017
220	"1.04 Better Luck Next Year!"	Anthony Troli	February 6, 2017
221	"1.05 Money for Nothing"	Ross Kimball	February 13, 2017
222	"1.06 Movie Truck"	Stacey Oristano	February 20, 2017
223	"1.07 What's Your Damage Heather?"	Jamie Woodham	February 27, 2017
224	"1.08 Blank Up, It's Time"	Allison Miller	March 6, 2017
225	"1.09 No One Takes Khaleesi's Dragons"	Mara Wilson	March 13, 2017
226	"The Marvelous Mrs. Maisel Men"	Jamie Woodham / Anthony Troli	March 20, 2017
227	"1.10 A Nutcracker In Paradise"	Carrie Rosen	March 27, 2017
228	"1.11 You Wanna See Something?"	Brock Wilbur	April 3, 2017
229	"Bunmail Guy Bro Heads"	TBA	April 10, 2017
230	"1.12 Channing Tatum is a Fine Actor"	Erin Mallory Long	April 17, 2017
231	"1.13 I'll Be Your Meyer Lansky"	Alice Wetterlund	April 24, 2017
232	"1.14 The Astronaut and the Ballerina"	Ben Siemon	May 1, 2017
233	"1.15 Take the Vicuna"	Margaret H. Willison	May 8, 2017
234	"1.16 There's Nothing Worse Than a Pantsuit"	Jason Mantzoukas	May 15, 2017
235	"1.17 It's Not a Mint"	Guy Branum	May 22, 2017
236	"1.18 Next! + Our Final 4 Words"	TBA	May 29, 2017
237	"Lauren Graham"	TBA	June 3, 2017

=== The Marvelous Mrs. Maisel ===
No.	Title	Guest	Original release date
238	"1.01 Pilot"	TBA	January 8, 2018
239	"1.02 Ya Shivu v Bolshom Dome Na Kholme"	Jamie Lee	January 15, 2018
240	"1.03 Because You Left"	Anthony Troli	January 22, 2018
241	"1.04 The Disappointment of the Dionne Quintuplets"	Veronica Osorio	January 29, 2018
242	"1.05 Doink"	Alison Rosen	February 5, 2018
243	"1.06 Mrs. X at the Gaslight"	Carrie Rosen	February 12, 2018
244	"1.07 Put That On Your Plate"	Gorgea Brooks	February 19, 2018
245	"Judaism on The Marvelous Mrs. Maisel"	Jordana Silverman	February 26, 2018
246	"1.08 Thank You And Good Night"	Guy Branum	March 5, 2018
247	"Maisel Goys - Season One"	Jason Mantzoukas	March 12, 2018
248	"2.01 Simone"	TBA	January 7, 2019
249	"2.02 Midway to Midtown"	Julia Prescott	January 14, 2019
250	"2.03 The Punishment Room"	Anthony Troli	January 21, 2019
251	"2.04 We're Going to the Catskills!"	Hrishikesh Hirway	January 28, 2019
252	"2.05 Midnight at the Concord"	Carrie Rosen	February 4, 2019
253	"2.06 Let's Face the Music and Dance"	Caitlin Weierhauser	February 11, 2019
254	"2.07 Look She Made a Hat"	Yedoye Travis	February 18, 2019
255	"2.08 Someday..."	TBA	February 25, 2019
256	"2.09 Vote For Kennedy, Vote For Kennedy"	Ben Siemon	March 4, 2019
257	"2.10 All Alone"	Guy Branum	March 11, 2019
258	"3.01 Strike Up The Band"	Tess Gattuso	February 3, 2020
259	"3.02 It's the Sixties, Man!"	Anthony Troli	February 10, 2020
260	"3.03 Panty Pose"	DC Pierson	February 17, 2020
261	"3.04 Hands!"	Renee Colvert	February 24, 2020
262	"3.05 It's Comedy or Cabbage"	Anna Lore	March 2, 2020
263	"3.06 Kind of Bleu"	Jocey Coffman	March 9, 2020
264	"3.07 Marvelous Radio"	Reilly Anspaugh	March 16, 2020
265	"3.08 A Jewish Girl Walks Into the Apollo"	Taylor Tomlinson	March 23, 2020

* This rating has been excluded from the average calculation.
** Demi's rating standard, "jawns", for episode 5.04 comes from a term in the Philadelphian vernacular, which essentially replaces or joins a noun.
† Rating normalized to a scale of 10 for average calculation.

== Special guests ==
- Aisha Muharrar (11 episodes)
- Alex Goldman
- Alice Wetterlund (4 episodes)
- Alison Rosen (2 episodes)
- Allison Miller (3 episodes)
- Allie Goertz (5 episodes)
- Amir Blumenfeld
- Anna Lore
- Annamarie Tendler
- Anthony King
- Anthony Troli (13 episodes)
- Bailey De Young
- Ben Epstein (2 episodes)
- Ben Rodgers
- Ben Schwartz
- Ben Siemon (10 episodes)
- Beth Stelling
- Brandi Brown
- Brian Huskey
- Brock Wilbur (6 episodes)
- Caitlin Weierhauser (2 episodes)
- Calum Worthy
- Carina Mackenzie
- Carrie Rosen (2 episodes)
- Chris Cubas (2 episodes)
- D'Arcy Carden
- DC Pierson (2 episodes)
- Dominic Dierkes
- Doug Benson
- Eliza Skinner
- Elizabeth Laime
- Emily Heller
- Erin Mallory Long
- Erin Whitehead
- Gorgea Brooks
- Guy Branum (6 episodes)
- Hank Green
- Hayes Davenport
- Hrishikesh Hirway (5 episodes)
- Jake Hurwitz
- Jamie Lee
- Jamie Woodham (10 episodes)
- Jason Mantzoukas (8 episodes)
- Jeff Hiller (2 episodes)
- Jessica McKenna
- Jessica St. Clair
- Jo Feldman
- John Paul Green
- Jordana Silverman
- Julia Prescott (2 episodes)
- Julieanne Smolinski
- Kate Spencer
- Keiko Agena (2 episodes)
- Keith Powell
- Krista Doyle
- Lauren Lapkus
- Louis Peitzman (4 episodes)
- Mara Wilson (3 episodes)
- Matt Mira (5 episodes)
- Megan Amram (2 episodes)
- Michael Ausiello (2 episodes)
- Mike Dicenzo
- Myles McNutt
- Neil Campbell
- Pamela Ribon
- Patrick Walsh (4 episodes)
- Paul F. Tompkins
- Paul Scheer
- Pete Holmes
- Retta
- Ross Kimball (5 episodes)
- Sarah Heyward (8 episodes)
- Sarah Ramos (4 episodes)
- Sean Clements (2 episodes)
- Stacey Oristano (5 episodes)
- Tara Copeland (2 episodes)
- Todd Buonopane
- Veronica Osorio
- Yedoye Travis

=== Gilmore Gabs guests ===
- Adam Wylie (Brad Langford)
- David Sutcliffe (Christopher Hayden)
- Emily Kuroda (Mrs. Kim)
- Grant-Lee Phillips (The Town Troubadour)
- Helen Pai (Producer)
- Jackson Douglas (Jackson Belleville)
- Jami Rudofsky (Casting Director)
- Jane Espenson (Writer, Season 4)
- Lauren Graham (Lorelai Gilmore)
- Liz Torres (Patricia "Ms. Patty" LaCosta)
- Liza Weil (Paris Geller)
- Louise Goffin (Sang the Gilmore Girls theme with her mother, Carole King)
- Kelly Bishop (Emily Gilmore)
- Keiko Agena (Lane Kim)
- Mara Casey (Casting Director)
- Matt L. Jones (Guest Role as Morgan)
- Michael Winters (Taylor Doose)
- Milo Ventimiglia (Jess Mariano)
- Rose Abdoo (Gypsy)
- Sam Phillips (Composer)
- Sean Gunn (Kirk Gleason)
- Scott Patterson (Luke Danes, 2 episodes)
- Sheila Lawrence (Writer, Seasons 2–4)
- Vanessa Marano (April Nardini)
- Yanic Truesdale (Michel Gerard)
