= The Lorelais' First Day at Yale =

- Gilmore Girls episode
- Episode no.: Season 4 Episode 2
- Directed by: Chris Long
- Written by: Amy Sherman-Palladino; Daniel Palladino
- Original air date: September 30, 2003

Episode chronology
← Previous "Ballrooms and Biscotti"	Next → "The Hobbit, the Sofa and Digger Stiles"

"The Lorelais' First Day at Yale" is the second episode of the fourth season of the American comedy-drama series Gilmore Girls. It originally aired on the WB in the United States on September 30, 2003. The episode was co-written by series creator Amy Sherman-Palladino and executive producer Daniel Palladino. It was directed by Chris Long.

== Plot synopsis ==
Lorelai Gilmore (Lauren Graham) helps her daughter Rory (Alexis Bledel) pack in preparation for her first day at Yale University. They borrow the pickup truck belonging to Luke (Scott Patterson), though he needs it later and Lorelai has trouble driving it. Luke stays in Stars Hollow to deal with divorce filings while the Gilmores find their way to and settle in Rory's dormitory.

Rory meets two suitemates: Tana Schrick (Olivia Hack), a socially awkward 15-year-old; and Paris Geller (Liza Weil), Rory's old friend from Chilton Academy, whose life coach (Mitch Silpa) has suggested that they share a room. Luke, meanwhile, must deal with the lawyers for his wife, Nicole. Lorelai returns to Stars Hollow and asks to keep using Luke's truck for longer than he likes.

Soon after Lorelai and her daughter have made their goodbyes, Rory pages her mother to come back to Yale. Lorelai decides to stay there all night, and they order delivery food from many nearby restaurants, inviting other first-year students to share. Rory makes new friends.

== Cast ==
- Lauren Graham as Lorelai Gilmore
- Alexis Bledel as Rory Gilmore
- Scott Patterson as Luke Danes
- Liza Weil as Paris Geller
- Olivia Hack as Tana Schrick
- Robert Cicchini as Russell Bynes
- Alan Oppenheimer as Mr. Blodgett
- Howard S. Miller as Mr. Stein #1
- Allan Wasserman as Mr. Stein #2
- Joy Darash as Tess
- Mitch Silpa as Terrence

== Reception ==
"The Lorelais' First Day at Yale" is included in several lists of Gilmore Girls "essential episodes". The episode is also cited as evidence of the different relationships Lorelai has with her mother and with her daughter: unlike what her mother Emily would have done, Lorelai helps her daughter (though Rory has been conditioned to exhibit separation anxiety) in a moment of crisis.

The podcast Gilmore Guys had praise for the episode, rating it an average of 8 out 10.
