= Dawn Powell =

American novelist, playwright, screenwriter (1896–1965)

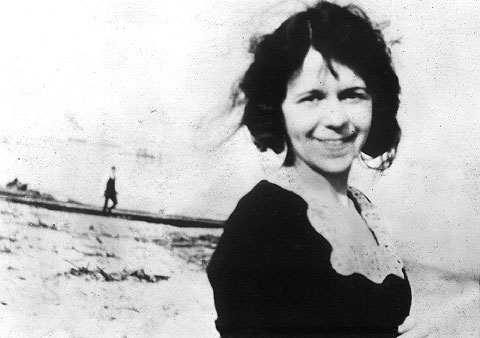
- Dawn Powell, c. 1914.
- Born: November 28, 1896; Mount Gilead, Ohio
- Died: November 14, 1965 (age 68); New York City
- Occupation: Writer
- Spouse: Joseph Gousha
- Children: Joseph R. Gousha Jr.
- Writing career
- Genre: Satirical fiction
- Notable works: A Time to Be Born (1942); The Locusts Have No King (1948); The Wicked Pavilion (1954)
- Notable awards: 1963 National Book Award nominee, 1964 American Academy of Arts and Letters presents her with the Marjorie Peabody Waite Award for lifetime achievement in literature

Dawn Powell (November 28, 1896 – November 14, 1965) was an American novelist, playwright, screenwriter, and short story writer. Known for her acerbic prose, "her relative obscurity was likely due to a general distaste for her harsh satiric tone." Nonetheless, Stella Adler and author Clifford Odets appeared in one of her plays. Her work was praised by Robert Benchley in The New Yorker and in 1939 she was signed as a Scribner author where Maxwell Perkins, famous for his work with many of her contemporaries, including Ernest Hemingway, F. Scott Fitzgerald and Thomas Wolfe, became her editor. A 1963 nominee for the National Book Award, she received an American Academy of Arts and Letters Marjorie Peabody Waite Award for lifetime achievement in literature the following year. A friend to many literary and arts figures of her day, including author John Dos Passos, critic Edmund Wilson, and poet E. E. Cummings, Powell's work received renewed interest after Gore Vidal praised it in a 1987 editorial for The New York Review of Books. Since then, the Library of America has published two collections of her novels.

== Life and career ==
Powell was born in Mount Gilead, Ohio, a village 45 miles north of Columbus and the county seat of Morrow County. Powell regularly gave her birth year as 1897 but primary documents support the earlier date of 1896. After her mother died when Powell was seven, she lived with a series of relatives around the state. Her father remarried, but his second wife was harsh and abusive toward the children; when her stepmother destroyed her notebooks and diaries, she ran away to live with an aunt, who encouraged her creative work. Powell later gave her childhood fictional form in the novel My Home Is Far Away (1944).

At Lake Erie College in Painesville, Ohio, she wrote stories and plays, acted in college productions, and edited the college newspaper. After graduation, she moved to Manhattan. Most of her subsequent writing would deal either with life in small Midwestern towns, or with the lives of people transplanted to New York City from such towns.

On November 20, 1920, she married Joseph Gousha, an aspiring poet and advertising copy-writer. In 1921, the couple had their only child, Joseph R. Gousha Jr. ("Jojo"), who would today likely be diagnosed with autism. Her husband abandoned poetry for steadier work in advertising, and the family moved to Greenwich Village, which remained her home base for the rest of her life. The Village served as both inspiration and backdrop for most of her writing; some of the key locations in her fiction remain standing today.

== Novels ==
Dawn Powell wrote hundreds of short stories, ten plays, a dozen novels, and an extended diary starting in 1931. Her writings, however, never generated enough money to live from. Throughout her life, she supported herself with various jobs, including being a freelance writer, an extra in silent films, a Hollywood screenwriter, a book reviewer, and a radio personality.

Her novel Whither was published in 1925, but she always described She Walks in Beauty (1928) as her first. Her favorite of her own novels, Dance Night, came out in 1930. The early work received uneven reviews, and none of it sold well. Her 1936 novel Turn, Magic Wheel, the first work that received both critical acclaim and reasonably good sales, marked a turn to social satire in a New York setting.

Her play Walking Down Broadway was filmed as Hello, Sister! (1933), co-written and co-directed by Erich von Stroheim.

In 1939, Scribner's became her publisher and Maxwell Perkins became her editor.

In 1942, Powell published her first commercially successful novel, A Time to Be Born, whose central figure—Amanda Keeler Evans, an egotistical hack writer whose work and media presence are bolstered by the assiduous promotion of her husband, the newspaper magnate Julian Evans—is loosely modelled on Clare Boothe Luce, wife of Henry Luce. A musical adaptation of the novel, written by Tajlei Levis and John Mercurio, was staged in New York City in 2006.

After the war, Powell's output slowed down, but it included some of her most acclaimed New York novels, including The Locusts Have No King (1948), a portrait of the disintegration and eventual rekindling of a love affair against the background of the city and the onset of the Cold War. The novel ends with news of the Bikini Atoll atom-bomb tests.

Two late novels show Powell's interest in the New York art world of the 1950s: The Wicked Pavilion (1954), an ensemble portrait of the characters orbiting around the Cafe Julien (a fictionalized Hotel Brevoort) and a vanished or deceased painter named Marius; and The Golden Spur (1962), set in a fictionalized Cedar Tavern, in which a young man's search for the identity and history of his dead father brings him to New York, where he becomes involved with the circle around a charismatic painter, Hugow.

== Old age and death ==
Later in life, Powell did most of her writing in an apartment at 95 Christopher Street.

Powell died in 1965 of colon cancer, fourteen days before her 69th birthday. Her executrix, Jacqueline Miller Rice (1931-2004), refused to claim the remains, which were then buried in Hart Island, New York City's potter's field.

== Revival ==
When Powell died, virtually all of her novels were out of print. Her posthumous champions included Matthew Josephson, Gore Vidal, and especially Tim Page, who joined forces with her family to free her manuscripts, diaries, and copyrights from her original executrix. The result was a revival in the late 1990s, when most of Powell's books were made available once more. Her papers are now in the Rare Books and Manuscripts Library of Columbia University in New York.

Powell is referenced in the 2002 Gilmore Girls episode "Help Wanted", in which Rory expresses sadness over her relative obscurity. That same year Powell was praised by the New York writer Fran Lebowitz on Book TV, in an episode titled The Best American Writer You've Never Heard Of. She is also referenced in the novel A Collection of Beauties at the Height of Their Popularity by Whitney Otto. She is also referenced by novelist Alan Furst in his 2014 work Midnight in Europe. She appears as a character in several scenes of Vidal's novel The Golden Age. More recently, she was referenced by novelist Michael Zadoorian in his 2020 book, The Narcissism of Small Differences.

The Message of the City: Dawn Powell's New York Novels by Patricia E. Palermo was published in 2016. It is a compilation of most of the critical work done on Powell, in her day and in ours, and also looks at how she turned her everyday life, discussed in her diaries and letters, into fiction.

== Awards ==
- 2015 — New York State Writers Hall of Fame
- 1964 — American Academy of Arts and Letters' Marjorie Peabody Waite Award for lifetime achievement in literature
- 1963 — National Book Award nominee for The Golden Spur

== Quotes ==
- "Satire is people as they are; romanticism, people as they would like to be; realism, people as they seem with their insides left out."
- "A novel must be a rich forest known at the start only by instinct."
- "A capacity for going overboard is a requisite for a full-grown mind."

== Bibliography ==
- 1925. Whither (novel). Boston: Small, Maynard.
- 1928. She Walks in Beauty (novel). New York: Brentano's.
- 1929. The Bride's House (novel). New York: Brentano's.
- 1930. Dance Night (novel). New York: Farrar & Rinehart.
- 1932. The Tenth Moon (novel). New York: Farrar & Rinehart. (Reprinted in 2001 by The Library of America as Come Back to Sorrento.)
- 1933. Big Night (play).
- 1934. Jig Saw: A Comedy (play). New York: Farrar & Rinehart
- 1934. The Story of a Country Boy (novel). New York: Farrar & Rinehart.
- 1936. Turn, Magic Wheel (novel). New York: Farrar & Rinehart.
- 1938. The Happy Island (novel). New York: Farrar & Rinehart.
- 1940. Angels on Toast (novel). New York: Charles Scribner's Sons. Reprinted in 1956 as A Man's Affair. New York: Fawcett.
- 1942. A Time to Be Born (novel). New York: Charles Scribner's Sons.
- 1944. My Home Is Far Away (novel). New York: Charles Scribner's Sons.
- 1948. The Locusts Have No King (novel). New York: Charles Scribner's Sons.
- 1952. Sunday, Monday and Always (stories). Boston: Houghton Mifflin. Reprint, 1999 (with four additional stories). Ed. Tim Page. South Royalton, Vt.: Steerforth Press.
- 1954. The Wicked Pavilion (novel). Boston: Houghton Mifflin.
- 1957. A Cage for Lovers (novel). Boston: Houghton Mifflin.
- 1962. The Golden Spur (novel). New York: Viking.
- 1994. Dawn Powell At Her Best, ed. Tim Page. South Royalton, Vt.: Steerforth Press.
- 1995. The Diaries of Dawn Powell, 1931–1965, ed. Tim Page. South Royalton, Vt.: Steerforth Press.
- 1999. Selected Letters of Dawn Powell, 1913–1965, ed. Tim Page. New York, NY: Henry Holt & Company.
- 1999. Four Plays, ed. Tim Page and Michael Sexton. South Royalton, Vt.: Steerforth Press.
- 2001. Novels 1930-1942, ed. Tim Page. The Library of America. ISBN 978-1-931082-01-3.
- 2001. Novels 1944-1962, ed. Tim Page. The Library of America. ISBN 978-1-931082-02-0.
