= Sorrento (disambiguation) =

Sorrento is a town in Southern Italy.

Sorrento may also refer to:

== Places ==
- Duchy of Sorrento, a principality of the Early Middle Ages centred on Sorrento, Italy
- Piano di Sorrento, a comune (municipality) in the Metropolitan City of Naples, Campania, Italy
- Sorrento, British Columbia, Canada
- Sorrento, Florida, United States
- Sorrento, Hong Kong
- Sorrento, Louisiana, United States
- Sorrento, Maine, United States
- Sorrento, Victoria, a town in Victoria, Australia
- Sorrento, Western Australia, suburb of Perth, Western Australia

== Other uses ==
- Sorrento Calcio, Italian football club
- Sorrento FC, a Western Australian semi-professional soccer club
- Sorrento Stakes, a thoroughbred horse race in Del Mar, California, United States
- Kia Sorento, a crossover SUV produced by Kia
- MV Sorrento, a number of ships with this name
- Paul Sorrento (born 1965), American baseball player
- Siren Sorrento, a character from Saint Seiya
- The Galbani brand of cheese and the Lactalis American Group, formerly Sorrento and Sorrento Lactalis

== See also ==
- Sorento (disambiguation)
- Sorrento Valley, San Diego
