= Alice Wetterlund =

American comedian

- Wetterlund at Dragon Con in 2026
- Born: May 16, 1981 (age 45)
- Occupations: Actress, comedian, podcast host
- Years active: 2010–present
- Known for: Silicon Valley
- Spouse: Andy Haynes (m. 2011; div. 2013)
- Website: alicewetterlund.com

Alice Wetterlund (born May 16, 1981) is an American stand-up comedian, actress, and podcast host. She played Carla Walton on the HBO sitcom Silicon Valley, and played D'arcy Bloom on the SyFy/USA Network TV series Resident Alien.

== Education and career ==
Wetterlund attended Cooper Union, a college in Lower Manhattan. She began doing stand-up comedy in the late 2000s, and performed with the Upright Citizens Brigade Theatre improv group from 2008 on. That led to an audition for MTV's Girl Code, where one of her notable parts was in a parody TV commercial for "Culture Culture Probiotics", a "cure" for diarrhea. Since then she has been featured in many television commercials for companies such as BMW, LensCrafters, Scotch-Brite, and Southwest Airlines. She appeared on Cave Comedy Radio as a teacher of meditation and cat whispering.

Wetterlund and Veronica Osorio co-host the Star Trek: The Next Generation podcast Treks and the City. Wetterlund and Kevin Porter co-host the Maisel Goys (hosted under the Gilmore Guys podcast) about Amazon Prime's television series The Marvelous Mrs. Maisel. She acted in the role of D'arcy Bloom in the Syfy series Resident Alien.

== Personal life ==
Wetterlund married comedian Andy Haynes on September 20, 2011; they divorced two years later.

== Filmography ==
=== Film ===
| Year | Title | Role | Notes |
|---|---|---|---|
| 2010 | Mad Men Jumps the Shark | Joan Holloway | Short |
| 2011 | The Math | Michelle Sellers | Short |
| 2011 | Close to You | Unknown | Also Writer and Producer |
| 2013 | Hashtag Warrior | Unknown | Short |
| 2014 | The Interview | Alice | |
| 2015 | The Shocking Truth about Planned Parenthood | Unknown | Short |
| 2015 | Welcome to Bridgetown | Herself | Documentary |
| 2016 | Mike and Dave Need Wedding Dates | Cousin Terry | |
| TBA | Normal | Sunny Berger | Short; post-production |

=== Television ===
| Year | Title | Role | Notes |
|---|---|---|---|
| 2015 | Chelsea Lately | Herself | 1 episode |
| 2015 | New Girl | Hostess | 1 episode |
| 2015 | Betas | Young Manager | 1 episode |
| 2013–15 | Girl Code | Herself | 76 episodes |
| 2015–16 | Silicon Valley | Carla Walton | 6 episodes |
| 2015–17 | @Midnight | Herself | 5 episodes |
| 2016 | Flophouse | Herself | 1 episode |
| 2016 | Adam DeVine's House Party | Herself | 1 episode |
| 2016 | The UCB Show | N/A | 1 episode |
| 2016 | Take My Wife | Alice | 1 episode |
| 2016 | Conan | Herself | 2 episodes |
| 2016–17 | People of Earth | Kelly Grady | 20 episodes |
| 2017 | Talk Show the Game Show | Herself | 1 episode |
| 2018 | GLOW | Carol | Episode: "Mother of All Matches" |
| 2018 | Alone Together | Stephie | Episode: "Mom" |
| 2018 | The 5th Quarter | Shirley | 2 episodes |
| 2019 | Single Parents | Nora | Episode: "The Shed" |
| 2019 | Ryan Hansen Solves Crimes on Television | Dr. Inx | Episode: "The Rhy Chromosome" |
| 2020 | Interrogation | Alice Morgan | 2 episodes |
| 2020 | Space Force | Maj. Jane Pike | Episode: "Lunar Habitat" |
| 2021–2025 | Resident Alien | D'Arcy Bloom | Main role, 44 episodes |
| 2022 | Star Trek: Lower Decks | Melponar Triplets (voice) | Episode: "Crisis Point II: Paradoxus" |
