= Sorento =

Sorento may refer to:

- The Kia Sorento, automobile
- Sorento, Illinois, United States

== See also ==
- Sorrento (disambiguation)
