= List of Gilmore Girls episodes =

Gilmore Girls is an American comedy drama television series created by Amy Sherman-Palladino. Sherman-Palladino served as executive producer, alongside Gavin Polone, Daniel Palladino, and David S. Rosenthal. It is produced by Dorothy Parker Drank Here Productions, Hofflund/Polone and Warner Bros. Television. The show follows single mother Lorelai Gilmore (Lauren Graham) and her daughter Rory (Alexis Bledel) in the fictional town of Stars Hollow, Connecticut, a close-knit small town with many quirky characters, located roughly thirty minutes south of Hartford.

From 2000 to 2006, the first six seasons of Gilmore Girls originally aired on The WB, before it later merged with UPN to form The CW for its seventh and final season. All seven seasons were released on DVD in Regions 1, 2, and 4. Over the course of the series, it averaged 5 million viewers per episode over its seven seasons. The series originally aired on Thursday at 8:00 pm (Eastern) in its first season. However, it was moved to Tuesday at 8:00 pm for the second season and held it for the rest of the series' run. The show placed No. 32 on Entertainment Weekly's "New TV Classics" list, and in 2007 it was listed as one of Time magazine's "All-TIME 100 TV Shows." The show is known for its comedic fast dialogue.

Over the course of seven seasons, Gilmore Girls aired a total of 153 episodes. It returned in 2016 for a limited miniseries A Year in the Life. The revival consists of four 90-minute episodes released on Netflix.

== Series overview ==
Season	Episodes	Originally released		
Season	Episodes	First released	Last released	Network
1	21	October 5, 2000	May 10, 2001	The WB
2	22	October 9, 2001	May 21, 2002	The WB
3	22	September 24, 2002	May 20, 2003	The WB
4	22	September 23, 2003	May 18, 2004	The WB
5	22	September 21, 2004	May 17, 2005	The WB
6	22	September 13, 2005	May 9, 2006	The WB
7	22	September 26, 2006	May 15, 2007	The CW

== Episodes ==
=== Season 1 (2000–01) ===
No. overall	No. in season	Title	Directed by	Written by	Original release date	Prod. code	US viewers (millions)
1	1	"Pilot"	Lesli Linka Glatter	Amy Sherman-Palladino	October 5, 2000	226730	5.03
2	2	"The Lorelais' First Day at Chilton"	Arlene Sanford	Amy Sherman-Palladino	October 12, 2000	226701	3.40
3	3	"Kill Me Now"	Adam Nimoy	Joanne Waters	October 19, 2000	226702	2.89
4	4	"The Deer Hunters"	Alan Myerson	Jed Seidel	October 26, 2000	226703	3.93
5	5	"Cinnamon's Wake"	Michael Katleman	Daniel Palladino	November 2, 2000	226704	3.88
6	6	"Rory's Birthday Parties"	Sarah Pia Anderson	Amy Sherman-Palladino	November 9, 2000	226705	3.73
7	7	"Kiss and Tell"	Rodman Flender	Jenji Kohan	November 16, 2000	226706	3.45
8	8	"Love and War and Snow"	Alan Myerson	Joan Binder Weiss	December 14, 2000	226707	3.80
9	9	"Rory's Dance"	Lesli Linka Glatter	Amy Sherman-Palladino	December 20, 2000	226708	3.62
10	10	"Forgiveness and Stuff"	Bethany Rooney	John Stephens	December 21, 2000	226709	3.60
11	11	"Paris Is Burning"	David Petrarca	Joan Binder Weiss	January 11, 2001	226710	4.32
12	12	"Double Date"	Lev L. Spiro	Amy Sherman-Palladino	January 18, 2001	226712	4.83
13	13	"Concert Interruptus"	Bruce Seth Green	Elaine Arata	February 15, 2001	226711	3.16
14	14	"That Damn Donna Reed"	Michael Katleman	Daniel Palladino & Amy Sherman-Palladino	February 22, 2001	226715	3.51
15	15	"Christopher Returns"	Michael Katleman	Daniel Palladino	March 1, 2001	226713	3.67
16	16	"Star-Crossed Lovers and Other Strangers"	Lesli Linka Glatter	Story by : Joan Binder Weiss; Teleplay by : John Stephens & Linda Loiselle Guzik	March 8, 2001	226714	3.38
17	17	"The Breakup, Part 2"	Nick Marck	Amy Sherman-Palladino	March 15, 2001	226716	4.17
18	18	"The Third Lorelai"	Michael Katleman	Amy Sherman-Palladino	March 22, 2001	226717	4.57
19	19	"Emily in Wonderland"	Perry Lang	John Stephens & Linda Loiselle Guzik	April 26, 2001	226718	3.37
20	20	"P.S. I Lo..."	Lev L. Spiro	Elaine Arata & Joan Binder Weiss	May 3, 2001	226719	3.16
21	21	"Love, Daisies and Troubadours"	Amy Sherman-Palladino	Daniel Palladino	May 10, 2001	226720	4.31

=== Season 2 (2001–02) ===
No. overall	No. in season	Title	Directed by	Written by	Original release date	Prod. code	US viewers (millions)
22	1	"Sadie, Sadie"	Amy Sherman-Palladino	Amy Sherman-Palladino	October 9, 2001	227451	6.55
23	2	"Hammers and Veils"	Michael Katleman	Amy Sherman-Palladino	October 9, 2001	227452	6.55
24	3	"Red Light on the Wedding Night"	Gail Mancuso	Daniel Palladino	October 16, 2001	227453	5.99
25	4	"The Road Trip to Harvard"	Jamie Babbit	Daniel Palladino	October 23, 2001	227454	6.39
26	5	"Nick & Nora/Sid & Nancy"	Michael Katleman	Amy Sherman-Palladino	October 30, 2001	227455	5.55
27	6	"Presenting Lorelai Gilmore"	Chris Long	Sheila R. Lawrence	November 6, 2001	227456	6.11
28	7	"Like Mother, Like Daughter"	Dennis Erdman	Joan Binder Weiss	November 13, 2001	227457	5.88
29	8	"The Ins and Outs of Inns"	Michael Katleman	Daniel Palladino	November 20, 2001	227458	5.49
30	9	"Run Away, Little Boy"	Danny Leiner	John Stephens	November 27, 2001	227459	5.79
31	10	"The Bracebridge Dinner"	Chris Long	Daniel Palladino	December 11, 2001	227460	5.27
32	11	"Secrets and Loans"	Nicole Holofcener	Linda Loiselle Guzik	January 22, 2002	227461	5.59
33	12	"Richard in Stars Hollow"	Steve Gomer	Frank Lombardi	January 29, 2002	227462	5.83
34	13	"A-Tisket, A-Tasket"	Robert Berlinger	Amy Sherman-Palladino	February 5, 2002	227463	5.48
35	14	"It Should've Been Lorelai"	Lesli Linka Glatter	Daniel Palladino	February 12, 2002	227464	5.34
36	15	"Lost and Found"	Gail Mancuso	Amy Sherman-Palladino	February 26, 2002	227465	5.52
37	16	"There's the Rub"	Amy Sherman-Palladino	Sheila R. Lawrence	April 9, 2002	227466	4.24
38	17	"Dead Uncles and Vegetables"	Jamie Babbit	Daniel Palladino	April 16, 2002	227467	5.06
39	18	"Back in the Saddle Again"	Kevin Dowling	Linda Loiselle Guzik	April 23, 2002	227468	4.62
40	19	"Teach Me Tonight"	Steve Robman	Amy Sherman-Palladino	April 30, 2002	227469	5.26
41	20	"Help Wanted"	Chris Long	Allan Heinberg	May 7, 2002	227470	5.97
42	21	"Lorelai's Graduation Day"	Jamie Babbit	Daniel Palladino	May 14, 2002	227471	5.23
43	22	"I Can't Get Started"	Amy Sherman-Palladino	Amy Sherman-Palladino & John Stephens	May 21, 2002	227472	6.21

=== Season 3 (2002–03) ===
No. overall	No. in season	Title	Directed by	Written by	Original release date	Prod. code	US viewers (millions)
44	1	"Those Lazy-Hazy-Crazy Days"	Amy Sherman-Palladino	Amy Sherman-Palladino	September 24, 2002	175001	6.20
45	2	"Haunted Leg"	Chris Long	Amy Sherman-Palladino	October 1, 2002	175002	6.75
46	3	"Application Anxiety"	Gail Mancuso	Daniel Palladino	October 8, 2002	175003	5.95
47	4	"One's Got Class and the Other One Dyes"	Steve Robman	Daniel Palladino	October 15, 2002	175004	5.79
48	5	"Eight O'Clock at the Oasis"	Joe Ann Fogle	Justin Tanner	October 22, 2002	175005	6.58
49	6	"Take the Deviled Eggs..."	Jamie Babbit	Daniel Palladino	November 5, 2002	175006	6.95
50	7	"They Shoot Gilmores, Don't They?"	Kenny Ortega	Amy Sherman-Palladino	November 12, 2002	175007	6.82
51	8	"Let the Games Begin"	Steve Robman	Amy Sherman-Palladino & Sheila R. Lawrence	November 19, 2002	175008	7.09
52	9	"A Deep-Fried Korean Thanksgiving"	Kenny Ortega	Daniel Palladino	November 26, 2002	175009	6.30
53	10	"That'll Do, Pig"	Jamie Babbit	Sheila R. Lawrence	January 14, 2003	175010	5.75
54	11	"I Solemnly Swear"	Carla McCloskey	John Stephens	January 21, 2003	175011	5.19
55	12	"Lorelai Out of Water"	Jamie Babbit	Janet Leahy	January 28, 2003	175012	5.19
56	13	"Dear Emily and Richard"	Gail Mancuso	Amy Sherman-Palladino	February 4, 2003	175013	6.20
57	14	"Swan Song"	Chris Long	Daniel Palladino	February 11, 2003	175014	5.19
58	15	"Face-Off"	Kenny Ortega	John Stephens	February 18, 2003	175015	5.75
59	16	"The Big One"	Jamie Babbit	Amy Sherman-Palladino	February 25, 2003	175016	6.21
60	17	"A Tale of Poes and Fire"	Chris Long	Daniel Palladino	April 15, 2003	175017	4.23
61	18	"Happy Birthday, Baby"	Gail Mancuso	Amy Sherman-Palladino	April 22, 2003	175018	5.10
62	19	"Keg! Max!"	Chris Long	Daniel Palladino	April 29, 2003	175019	4.83
63	20	"Say Goodnight, Gracie"	Jamie Babbit	Janet Leahy & Amy Sherman-Palladino	May 6, 2003	175020	5.17
64	21	"Here Comes the Son"	Amy Sherman-Palladino	Amy Sherman-Palladino	May 13, 2003	175021	5.04
65	22	"Those Are Strings, Pinocchio"	Jamie Babbit	Daniel Palladino	May 20, 2003	175022	5.49

=== Season 4 (2003–04) ===
No. overall	No. in season	Title	Directed by	Written by	Original release date	Prod. code	US viewers (millions)
66	1	"Ballrooms and Biscotti"	Amy Sherman-Palladino	Amy Sherman-Palladino	September 23, 2003	176151	4.53
67	2	"The Lorelais' First Day at Yale"	Chris Long	Daniel Palladino	September 30, 2003	176152	4.92
68	3	"The Hobbit, the Sofa and Digger Stiles"	Matthew Diamond	Amy Sherman-Palladino	October 7, 2003	176153	5.14
69	4	"Chicken or Beef?"	Chris Long	Jane Espenson	October 14, 2003	176154	5.40
70	5	"The Fundamental Things Apply"	Neema Barnette	John Stephens	October 21, 2003	176155	5.08
71	6	"An Affair to Remember"	Matthew Diamond	Amy Sherman-Palladino	October 28, 2003	176156	5.16
72	7	"The Festival of Living Art"	Chris Long	Daniel Palladino	November 4, 2003	176157	5.10
73	8	"Die, Jerk"	Tom Moore	Daniel Palladino	November 11, 2003	176158	5.31
74	9	"Ted Koppel's Big Night Out"	Jamie Babbit	Amy Sherman-Palladino	November 18, 2003	176159	5.07
75	10	"The Nanny and the Professor"	Peter Lauer	Scott Kaufer	January 20, 2004	176160	4.97
76	11	"In the Clamor and the Clangor"	Michael Grossman	Sheila R. Lawrence & Janet Leahy	January 27, 2004	176161	4.82
77	12	"A Family Matter"	Kenny Ortega	Daniel Palladino	February 3, 2004	176162	4.64
78	13	"Nag Hammadi Is Where They Found the Gnostic Gospels"	Chris Long	Amy Sherman-Palladino	February 10, 2004	176163	4.56
79	14	"The Incredible Sinking Lorelais"	Stephen Clancy	Amy Sherman-Palladino & Daniel Palladino	February 17, 2004	176164	5.28
80	15	"Scene in a Mall"	Chris Long	Daniel Palladino	February 24, 2004	176165	4.75
81	16	"The Reigning Lorelai"	Marita Grabiak	Jane Espenson	March 2, 2004	176166	4.71
82	17	"Girls in Bikinis, Boys Doin' the Twist"	Jamie Babbit	Amy Sherman-Palladino	April 13, 2004	176167	4.95
83	18	"Tick, Tick, Tick, Boom!"	Daniel Palladino	Daniel Palladino	April 20, 2004	176168	3.95
84	19	"Afterboom"	Michael Zinberg	Sheila R. Lawrence	April 27, 2004	176169	4.52
85	20	"Luke Can See Her Face"	Matthew Diamond	Amy Sherman-Palladino & Daniel Palladino	May 4, 2004	176170	4.68
86	21	"Last Week Fights, This Week Tights"	Chris Long	Daniel Palladino	May 11, 2004	176171	4.61
87	22	"Raincoats and Recipes"	Amy Sherman-Palladino	Amy Sherman-Palladino	May 18, 2004	176172	5.46

=== Season 5 (2004–05) ===
No. overall	No. in season	Title	Directed by	Written by	Original release date	Prod. code	US viewers (millions)
88	1	"Say Goodbye to Daisy Miller"	Amy Sherman-Palladino	Amy Sherman-Palladino	September 21, 2004	2T5301	5.80
89	2	"A Messenger, Nothing More"	Daniel Palladino	Daniel Palladino	September 28, 2004	2T5302	5.99
90	3	"Written in the Stars"	Kenny Ortega	Amy Sherman-Palladino	October 5, 2004	2T5303	6.10
91	4	"Tippecanoe and Taylor, Too"	Lee Shallat-Chemel	Bill Prady	October 12, 2004	2T5304	5.81
92	5	"We Got Us a Pippi Virgin"	Stephen Clancy	Daniel Palladino	October 19, 2004	2T5305	5.64
93	6	"Norman Mailer, I'm Pregnant!"	Matthew Diamond	James Berg & Stan Zimmerman	October 26, 2004	2T5306	5.82
94	7	"You Jump, I Jump, Jack"	Kenny Ortega	Daniel Palladino	November 2, 2004	2T5307	5.81
95	8	"The Party's Over"	Eric Laneuville	Amy Sherman-Palladino	November 9, 2004	2T5308	6.13
96	9	"Emily Says Hello"	Kenny Ortega	Rebecca Rand Kirshner	November 16, 2004	2T5309	6.01
97	10	"But Not as Cute as Pushkin"	Michael Zinberg	Amy Sherman-Palladino	November 30, 2004	2T5310	6.23
98	11	"Women of Questionable Morals"	Matthew Diamond	Daniel Palladino	January 25, 2005	2T5311	5.05
99	12	"Come Home"	Kenny Ortega	Jessica Queller	February 1, 2005	2T5312	4.68
100	13	"Wedding Bell Blues"	Amy Sherman-Palladino	Amy Sherman-Palladino	February 8, 2005	2T5313	6.33
101	14	"Say Something"	Daniel Palladino	Daniel Palladino	February 15, 2005	2T5314	5.32
102	15	"Jews and Chinese Food"	Matthew Diamond	Amy Sherman-Palladino	February 22, 2005	2T5315	5.25
103	16	"So...Good Talk"	Jamie Babbit	Lisa Randolph	March 1, 2005	2T5316	5.51
104	17	"Pulp Friction"	Michael Zinberg	James Berg & Stan Zimmerman	March 8, 2005	2T5317	5.23
105	18	"To Live and Let Diorama"	Jackson Douglas	Daniel Palladino	April 19, 2005	2T5318	4.81
106	19	"But I'm a Gilmore!"	Michael Zinberg	Amy Sherman-Palladino	April 26, 2005	2T5319	5.52
107	20	"How Many Kropogs to Cape Cod?"	Jamie Babbit	Bill Prady & Rebecca Rand Kirshner	May 3, 2005	2T5320	5.10
108	21	"Blame Booze and Melville"	Jamie Babbit	Daniel Palladino	May 10, 2005	2T5321	5.39
109	22	"A House Is Not a Home"	Amy Sherman-Palladino	Amy Sherman-Palladino	May 17, 2005	2T5322	5.89

=== Season 6 (2005–06) ===
No. overall	No. in season	Title	Directed by	Written by	Original release date	Prod. code	US viewers (millions)
110	1	"New and Improved Lorelai"	Amy Sherman-Palladino	Amy Sherman-Palladino	September 13, 2005	2T6301	6.22
111	2	"Fight Face"	Daniel Palladino	Daniel Palladino	September 20, 2005	2T6302	5.79
112	3	"The UnGraduate"	Michael Zinberg	David S. Rosenthal	September 27, 2005	2T6303	5.45
113	4	"Always a Godmother, Never a God"	Robert Berlinger	Rebecca Rand Kirshner	October 4, 2005	2T6304	5.96
114	5	"We've Got Magic to Do"	Michael Zinberg	Daniel Palladino	October 11, 2005	2T6305	6.16
115	6	"Welcome to the Doll House"	Jackson Douglas	Keith Eisner	October 18, 2005	2T6306	6.08
116	7	"Twenty-One is the Loneliest Number"	Robert Berlinger	Amy Sherman-Palladino	October 25, 2005	2T6307	6.02
117	8	"Let Me Hear Your Balalaikas Ringing Out"	Kenny Ortega	Daniel Palladino	November 8, 2005	2T6308	5.84
118	9	"The Prodigal Daughter Returns"	Amy Sherman-Palladino	Amy Sherman-Palladino	November 15, 2005	2T6309	6.19
119	10	"He's Slippin' 'Em Bread...Dig?"	Kenny Ortega	Daniel Palladino	November 22, 2005	2T6310	6.30
120	11	"The Perfect Dress"	Jamie Babbit	Amy Sherman-Palladino	January 10, 2006	2T6311	5.79
121	12	"Just Like Gwen and Gavin"	Stephen Clancy	Daniel Palladino	January 17, 2006	2T6312	5.67
122	13	"Friday Night's Alright for Fighting"	Kenny Ortega	Amy Sherman-Palladino	January 31, 2006	2T6313	5.22
123	14	"You've Been Gilmored"	Stephen Clancy	Jordon Nardino	February 7, 2006	2T6314	5.40
124	15	"A Vineyard Valentine"	Daniel Palladino	Daniel Palladino	February 14, 2006	2T6316	5.34
125	16	"Bridesmaids Revisited"	Linda Mendoza	Rebecca Rand Kirshner	February 28, 2006	2T6315	5.01
126	17	"I'm OK, You're OK"	Lee Shallat-Chemel	Keith Eisner	April 4, 2006	2T6317	4.47
127	18	"The Real Paul Anka"	Daniel Palladino	Daniel Palladino	April 11, 2006	2T6318	4.13
128	19	"I Get a Sidekick Out of You"	Amy Sherman-Palladino	Amy Sherman-Palladino	April 18, 2006	2T6319	4.31
129	20	"Super Cool Party People"	Ken Whittingham	David S. Rosenthal	April 25, 2006	2T6320	4.98
130	21	"Driving Miss Gilmore"	Jamie Babbit	Daniel Palladino & Amy Sherman-Palladino	May 2, 2006	2T6321	5.12
131	22	"Partings"	Amy Sherman-Palladino	Daniel Palladino & Amy Sherman-Palladino	May 9, 2006	2T6322	5.33

=== Season 7 (2006–07) ===
No. overall	No. in season	Title	Directed by	Written by	Original release date	Prod. code	US viewers (millions)
132	1	"The Long Morrow"	Lee Shallat-Chemel	David S. Rosenthal	September 26, 2006	2T7751	4.48
133	2	"That's What You Get, Folks, for Makin' Whoopee"	Bethany Rooney	Rebecca Rand Kirshner	October 3, 2006	2T7752	4.62
134	3	"Lorelai's First Cotillion"	Lee Shallat-Chemel	Rina Mimoun	October 10, 2006	2T7753	4.71
135	4	"'S Wonderful, 'S Marvelous"	Victor Nelli, Jr.	Gayle Abrams	October 17, 2006	2T7754	4.85
136	5	"The Great Stink"	Michael Schultz	Gina Fattore	October 24, 2006	2T7755	4.73
137	6	"Go, Bulldogs!"	Wil Shriner	David S. Rosenthal & Rebecca Rand Kirshner	November 7, 2006	2T7757	4.34
138	7	"French Twist"	Lee Shallat-Chemel	David Babcock	November 14, 2006	2T7756	4.51
139	8	"Introducing Lorelai Planetarium"	Lee Shallat-Chemel	Jennie Snyder	November 21, 2006	2T7758	4.20
140	9	"Knit, People, Knit!"	Lee Shallat-Chemel	David Grae	November 28, 2006	2T7759	4.89
141	10	"Merry Fisticuffs"	Jackson Douglas	David S. Rosenthal	December 5, 2006	2T7760	4.82
142	11	"Santa's Secret Stuff"	Lee Shallat-Chemel	Rebecca Rand Kirshner	January 23, 2007	2T7761	3.72
143	12	"To Whom It May Concern"	Jamie Babbit	David Babcock	January 30, 2007	2T7762	4.27
144	13	"I'd Rather Be in Philadelphia"	Lee Shallat-Chemel	Rebecca Rand Kirshner	February 6, 2007	2T7763	4.70
145	14	"Farewell, My Pet"	Jamie Babbit	Jennie Snyder	February 13, 2007	2T7764	4.37
146	15	"I Am Kayak, Hear Me Roar"	Lee Shallat-Chemel	Rebecca Rand Kirshner	February 20, 2007	2T7765	4.05
147	16	"Will You Be My Lorelai Gilmore?"	David Paymer	Gina Fattore & Gayle Abrams	February 27, 2007	2T7766	4.17
148	17	"Gilmore Girls Only"	Lee Shallat-Chemel	David Babcock	March 6, 2007	2T7767	4.47
149	18	"Hay Bale Maze"	Stephen Clancy	Rebecca Rand Kirshner	April 17, 2007	2T7768	3.79
150	19	"It's Just Like Riding a Bike"	Lee Shallat-Chemel	Jennie Snyder	April 24, 2007	2T7769	3.75
151	20	"Lorelai? Lorelai?"	Bethany Rooney	David S. Rosenthal	May 1, 2007	2T7770	4.08
152	21	"Unto the Breach"	Lee Shallat-Chemel	David Babcock & Jennie Snyder	May 8, 2007	2T7771	3.99
153	22	"Bon Voyage"	Lee Shallat-Chemel	David S. Rosenthal	May 15, 2007	2T7772	4.86

== Ratings ==
Gilmore Girls : U.S. viewers per episode (millions)

Season	Episode number																						Average
Season	1	2	3	4	5	6	7	8	9	10	11	12	13	14	15	16	17	18	19	20	21	22	Average
1	5.03	3.40	2.89	3.93	3.88	3.73	3.45	3.80	3.62	3.60	4.32	4.83	3.16	3.51	3.67	3.38	4.17	4.57	3.37	3.16	4.31	–	3.80
2	6.55	6.55	5.99	6.39	5.55	6.11	5.88	5.49	5.79	5.30	5.59	5.83	5.48	5.34	5.52	4.24	5.06	4.62	5.26	5.97	5.23	6.21	5.63
3	6.20	6.75	5.95	5.79	6.58	6.95	6.82	7.09	6.30	5.75	5.19	5.19	6.20	5.19	5.75	6.21	4.23	5.10	4.83	5.17	5.04	5.49	5.81
4	4.53	4.92	5.14	5.40	5.08	5.16	5.10	5.31	5.07	4.97	4.82	4.64	4.56	5.28	4.75	4.71	4.95	3.95	4.52	4.68	4.61	5.46	4.89
5	5.80	5.99	6.10	5.81	5.64	5.82	5.81	6.13	6.01	6.23	5.05	4.68	6.33	5.32	5.25	5.51	5.23	4.81	5.52	5.10	5.39	5.89	5.61
6	6.22	5.79	5.45	5.96	6.16	6.08	6.02	5.84	6.19	6.30	5.79	5.67	5.22	5.40	5.34	5.01	4.47	4.13	4.31	4.98	5.12	5.33	5.49
7	4.48	4.62	4.71	4.85	4.73	4.34	4.51	4.20	4.89	4.82	3.72	4.27	4.70	4.37	4.05	4.17	4.47	3.79	3.75	4.08	3.99	4.86	4.38

Audience measurement performed by Nielsen Media Research
