= Come Back to Sorrento (novel) =

1932 novel by Dawn Powell

- Cover with the alternate title, 'The Tenth Moon'
- Author: Dawn Powell
- Publication date: 1932
- Publication place: United States
- OCLC: 37300789

Come Back to Sorrento is a novel written by Dawn Powell. Against Powell's wishes, the publisher changed its title to The Tenth Moon when it was first published in 1932.

== Publication history ==
- 1932: The Tenth Moon. New York, NY: Farrar & Rinehart.
- 1997: Come Back to Sorrento. Royalton, Vermont: Steerforth Press.
- 2000: Come Back to Sorrento. London, UK: Turnaround.
- 2001: Dawn Powell: Novels 1930–1942. New York: The Library of America. ISBN 1-931082-01-4.
