= Stephen Clancy =

Irish cyclist

Personal information
- Born: 19 July 1992 (age 34) Limerick, Ireland

Cycling career
- Sport: Cycling
- Current team: Team Novo Nordisk
- Discipline: Road
- Role: Rider

Amateur teams
- 2011: Limerick CC
- 2012: Dan Morrissey–Speedy Spokes

Professional team
- 2013–: Team Novo Nordisk

Stephen Clancy (born 19 July 1992) is an Irish professional racing cyclist, who currently rides for UCI ProTeam Team Novo Nordisk. Clancy joined Team Novo Nordisk in 2013, and like all of the team's riders, he has been diagnosed with Type 1 diabetes. He resides in Girona.
