= MV Sorrento =

A number of merchant vessels have carried the name Sorrento, after the Italian city.

- MV Sorrento (1925), in service 1925–26
- MV Sorrento (2001), in active service as of 2010
- MV Sorrento (2003), an Italian ferry which caught fire in 2015
