= You Jump, I Jump, Jack =

- Gilmore Girls episode
- Episode no.: Season 5 Episode 7
- Directed by: Kenny Ortega
- Written by: Daniel Palladino
- Production code: 2T5307
- Original air date: November 2, 2004
- Running time: 44 minutes

Episode chronology
| ← Previous "Norman Mailer, I'm Pregnant!" | Next → "The Party's Over" |

"You Jump, I Jump, Jack" is the seventh episode of season 5 of Gilmore Girls. In the episode, Luke (Scott Patterson) meets Emily (Kelly Bishop) at dinner and Richard (Edward Herrmann) for golf, while Rory (Alexis Bledel) is taken on a Life and Death Brigade event with Logan (Matt Czuchry), where the pair jump off scaffolding from a large height. A key episode for Logan, "You Jump, I Jump, Jack" also marks the debut of the Life and Death Brigade member Robert (Nick Holmes). The episode was watched by approximately 5.81 million viewers on its premiere and received mostly positive critical reception.

== Plot ==
Emily discovers that Lorelai (Lauren Graham) is dating Luke and insists on meeting him. Lorelai anxiously approaches Luke, looking for a way out, but Luke agrees to come to dinner. Emily makes comments about Luke, including his job and recent divorce, which Lorelai interprets as pointed attacks. As the night continues, Emily's comments become more vicious and Luke sees Lorelai's point. Richard later calls Luke to arrange a golf game, confirming it before Luke can properly reply. Lorelai tries to make both of them cancel it, but it goes ahead.

Richard convinces Luke to buy golfing equipment. Luke plays poorly as Richard attempts to convince him to begin a franchise of diners. Luke calls Lorelai, beyond his depth, as Richard has set him up with numerous business contacts. She convinces him to leave. Emily is angry at Richard for the excursion, viewing Luke as completely unsuitable for Lorelai.

Doyle (Danny Strong) talks to Rory about her lead to uncover information about the secretive Life and Death Brigade. Rory hears a message from Dean (Jared Padalecki) to schedule a date between their busy schedules. Meeting Logan, she is blindfolded and enters a car with Colin (Alan Loayza), Finn (Tanc Sade) and Stephanie (Katherine Bailess). When they arrive in a forest with tents and camping equipment, Rory's blindfold is removed. She quickly calls Dean to say that she is not free tomorrow. The first people she approaches are conversing rapidly without using the letter "e". After a while, she has filled up two notebooks with details, though Logan talks to her about off-limit information to keep the group anonymous.

The next morning, Rory is told to wear a ball gown. The large cohort gather and ceremonially drink champagne after declaring "In omnia paratus". Rory observes men carrying women by cart as they play polo and a man discharging a paintball gun at another man jumping off a table. The main event is a group of six jumping from a great height; Logan convinces a reluctant Rory to join him as two of the six. They jump while holding umbrellas and attached to a band, Logan holding Rory's hand.

Zach (Todd Lowe) awkwardly approaches Lane (Keiko Agena) to arrange their first date, but they fail to pick a time. Later, they meet in the living room. Deciding against leaving the house, they watch a movie. Brian tries to join them, but Lane lets him go in her room. At the end of the movie, Zach and Lane kiss.

== Production ==
Nick Holmes debuts in the episode as Robert, a member of the Life and Death Brigade. Holmes had previously auditioned for three roles, initially for the pilot as Dean, and later as Tristin and Jess. His first day of filming was on location at Griffith Park, for the Life and Death Brigade event scenes, starting in the evening and continuing through to 3 a.m. While driving back, he got a flat tire.

"You Jump, I Jump, Jack" is the only episode whose DVD commentary featured showrunner Amy Sherman-Palladino. She comments alongside Daniel Palladino, leaving several minutes before the end of the episode without explanation. Sherman-Palladino makes some comments not specifically about the episode, describing her first meeting with Bledel and saying that Graham was the last of the main roles to be cast.

Matt Czuchry has described the episode as one of his favorites. In 2020, Czuchry said that the episode "defines the relationship between Logan and Rory" and recommended that new viewers begin with the episode. In 2016, he compared it to a scene with Logan, Colin, Finn and Robert in the finale of Gilmore Girls: A Year in the Life, "Fall".

== Analysis ==
"You Jump, I Jump, Jack" is the first major episode for Logan's character. One of many journalism-related popular culture allusions in the series, the episode references the 1976 film All the President's Men in the scene where Rory and Doyle talk about her lead on a story about the Life and Death Brigade. Doyle then mentions the film by name, one of several times it appears in the show's dialogue.

== Reception ==
"You Jump, I Jump, Jack" first aired in the U.S. on November 2, 2004, and received an overnight rating of 5.81 million viewers.

In a negative review for The A.V. Club, Gwen Ihnat criticized the Life and Death Brigade as the "worst" of Sherman-Palladino's "apparent fascinations with upper-class trappings".

Sabienna Bowman of Bustle viewed it as Logan's best episode. Haley Kluge of Variety found it the fifth-best episode of Gilmore Girls, writing that it shows "the best version of the Logan-Rory dynamic", in which Logan gets Rory "outside of her comfort zone". Kluge said that the "carnival-like backdrop" causes the episode to "feel special". Rating it 19th of the 157 episodes of Gilmore Girls and A Year in the Life, Constance Grady of Vox reviewed that it is "gorgeous", allowing it to "sell the fantasy of Logan’s world". National Post's Sadaf Ahsan and Mashable's Erin Strecker both viewed the episode as an important one to rewatch in advance of A Year in the Life.
