= Teresa Medina =

Spanish cinematographer (born 1965)

- Born: Teresa Medina; 30 December 1965 (age 59); Madrid, Spain
- Occupation: Cinematographer

Teresa Medina (born 30 December 1965) is a Spanish cinematographer.

She was born in Madrid.

== Filmography ==
Year	Title	Role	Notes
2004	Forever Is a Long, Long Time		
2001	The Blue Diner		
2000	Gilmore Girls	9 episodes	Rory's Dance, Love and War and Snow, Kiss and Tell, Rory's Birthday Parties, Cinnamon's Wake, The Deer Hunters, Kill Me Now, The Lorelais' First Day at Chilton, Pilot
1999	La rosa de piedra		
1999	The 24 Hour Woman		
1997	Todo está oscuro		
1996	Final Vendetta		
1996	Cosas que nunca te dije		
1996	Female Perversions		
1995	Love Street	1 episode	Freudian Slip
1994	Reflections on a Crime		
1994	A Rainy Day		
1994	Unconditional Love		
1993	The Chili Con Carne Club		
