= Gilmore Girls season 1 =

Gilmore Girls
- Season 1
- Season 1 DVD cover
- Showrunner: Amy Sherman-Palladino
- Starring: Lauren Graham; Alexis Bledel; Melissa McCarthy; Keiko Agena; Yanic Truesdale; Scott Patterson; Kelly Bishop; Edward Herrmann
- No. of episodes: 21

Release
- Original network: The WB
- Original release: October 5, 2000 – May 10, 2001

Season chronology
- Next → Season 2

The first season of Gilmore Girls, an American comedy drama television series, began airing on October 5, 2000, on The WB. The season concluded on May 10, 2001, after 21 episodes. The season originally aired on Thursdays at 8 pm ET.

The show was first announced for pickup by The WB for the 2000–2001 season on May 16, 2000, a month after the original filming of the pilot episode in April in the Toronto suburb of Unionville. On March 20, 2001, The WB announced the show's renewal for a second season.

== Overview ==
The first season of Gilmore Girls introduces Lorelai Gilmore (Lauren Graham) and her sixteen-year-old daughter, Rory (Alexis Bledel), as well as the fictional Connecticut town of Stars Hollow and its many quirky inhabitants. The central plot point of the season revolves around Rory's acceptance to Chilton, an elite prep school, and Lorelai's need to borrow money from her parents, Emily (Kelly Bishop) and Richard (Edward Herrmann), to fund her daughter's education. Lorelai's parents agree to lend her the money, but with one condition: she and Rory must attend dinner at their home in nearby Hartford every Friday night until the loan is repaid.

Lorelai's relationship with her parents is full of animosity. Not long after giving birth to Rory as a teenager, at the age of 16, she left her parents’ home and moved to Stars Hollow to prevent them from imposing their privileged lifestyle on her daughter. Although still loving her a great deal, her parents continue to resent her for this choice. This results in a significant portion of the conflict throughout the season as Lorelai deals with having her parents in her life on a regular basis for the first time since she was a teenager. It also leads to Lorelai feeling distressed by Rory's positive relationship with her grandparents and obvious interest in their way of life.

In the pilot episode, Rory meets Dean Forester (Jared Padalecki), a new student at Stars Hollow High School who has a crush on her. As the season progresses, she grows to have feelings for him, and they begin dating. Their relationship is briefly interrupted after Dean breaks up with her for not knowing how to respond to his stating that he loves her. Rory professes her love for Dean in the season finale, and they resume their relationship.

The season shows Rory as having strong friendships with both longtime friend Lane Kim (Keiko Agena) and fellow Chilton student Paris Geller (Liza Weil). She has been friends with Lane for over a decade, and the two remain close even when Rory changes schools. When Rory first arrives at Chilton, her relationship with Paris is more that of enemies than friends. However, as the season progresses, the two grow closer, eventually forming a begrudging friendship.

Lorelai has no love interest when the series begins, but she soon develops feelings for Rory's English teacher at Chilton, Max Medina (Scott Cohen). They date for several episodes, but break up when Lorelai begins to feel uncomfortable about how accepting Rory is of having Max in their lives. There is a clear attraction between her and Luke Danes (Scott Patterson), the owner of the local diner, but nothing ever comes of it. Lorelai also briefly reunites with Rory's father, Christopher (David Sutcliffe), but turns him down when he asks her to marry him. Lorelai and Max reunite toward the end of the season, and he proposes in the season finale.

Lorelai is close friends with Sookie St. James (Melissa McCarthy), the chef at the inn she manages. The two plan to eventually open their own inn together.

== Cast ==
=== Main cast ===
- Lauren Graham as Lorelai Gilmore, Rory's mother.
- Alexis Bledel as Lorelai "Rory" Gilmore, Lorelai's daughter.
- Melissa McCarthy as Sookie St. James, Lorelai's best friend and co-worker.
- Keiko Agena as Lane Kim, Rory's best friend.
- Yanic Truesdale as Michel Gerard, Sookie and Lorelai's co-worker.
- Scott Patterson as Luke Danes, the owner of the local diner.
- Kelly Bishop as Emily Gilmore, Lorelai's mother and Rory's grandmother.
- Edward Herrmann as Richard Gilmore, Lorelai's father and Rory's grandfather.

=== Recurring cast ===
- Jared Padalecki as Dean Forester, Rory's boyfriend.
- Liz Torres as Miss Patty, the owner of the local dance studio.
- Liza Weil as Paris Geller, Rory's classmate and nemesis.
- Sean Gunn as Mick / Kirk Gleason, a resident of Stars Hollow who works many jobs.
- Teal Redmann as Louise Grant, Paris's best friend.
- Shelly Cole as Madeline Lynn, Paris's best friend.
- Jackson Douglas as Jackson Belleville, Sookie's boyfriend.
- Chad Michael Murray as Tristin Dugray, Rory's classmate and secret admirer
- Sally Struthers as Babette Dell, Rory and Lorelai's nextdoor neighbor.
- Michael Winters as Taylor Doose, the owner of the local grocery store.
- Emily Kuroda as Mrs. Kim, Lane's religious mother.
- Scott Cohen as Max Medina, Rory's English teacher and Lorelai's boyfriend.
- Ted Rooney as Morey Dell, Babette's husband and Rory and Lorelai's nextdoor neighbor.
- Lisa Ann Hadley as Rachel, Luke's girlfriend.
- Grant Lee Phillips as Grant, the town troubadour.
- Alex Borstein as Drella, the harp-player at the Independence Inn.
- Mike Gandolfi as Andrew, the owner of the local bookstore.
- Dakin Matthews as Hanlin Charleston, the principal of Rory's school.
- David Sutcliffe as Christopher Hayden, Rory's father and Lorelai's ex-boyfriend.
- Marion Ross as Lorelai 'Trix' Gilmore the First, Richard's mother, Lorelai's grandmother, and Rory's great-grandmother.
- Scout Taylor Compton as Clara Forester, Dean's younger sister.

== Crew ==
The season was produced by Warner Bros., Amy Sherman-Palladino and Gavin Polone and was aired on the WB Network in the United States. The series was created by Amy Sherman-Palladino, who acted as an executive producer. Sherman-Palladino served as the season's show runner.

== Episodes ==
No. overall	No. in season	Title	Directed by	Written by	Original release date	Prod. code	US viewers (millions)
1	1	"Pilot"	Lesli Linka Glatter	Amy Sherman-Palladino	October 5, 2000	226730	5.03
After Rory is accepted to Chilton, an extremely prestigious and expensive prep school, Lorelai's difficulty in raising the tuition money forces her to ask her wealthy parents, from whom she is estranged, for a loan. The elder Gilmores happily loan their daughter the money in exchange for an end to the estrangement and a family dinner every Friday night. In her last week at Stars Hollow High School, Rory meets a very cute new transfer student named Dean, which gives her second thoughts about attending Chilton. When Lorelai discovers that her ambivalence about Chilton centers on a boy, they argue about her future, but after the first Friday night family dinner at her grandparents' house, Rory makes up with her mother and decides to go to Chilton after all when she realizes the sacrifice her mother has made in agreeing to end the estrangement with her grandparents.
2	2	"The Lorelais' First Day at Chilton"	Arlene Sanford	Amy Sherman-Palladino	October 12, 2000	226701	3.40
Lorelai oversleeps on Rory's first day of Chilton, and discovers that all her good clothes are at the cleaners. She throws on a tiny tie-dyed top, cutoff shorts, and cowboy boots to the dismay of Rory, the Chilton headmaster, and Emily, who has shown up for Rory's first day. Lorelai and Emily leave after an awkward conversation in the headmaster's office, bickering the entire way out. Rory's day goes downhill from there. She is handed a three inch binder containing one week's worth of notes from one class and meets several insufferable classmates who are determined to make her life at Chilton miserable.
3	3	"Kill Me Now"	Adam Nimoy	Joanne Waters	October 19, 2000	226702	2.89
When Rory announces at Friday night dinner that she has to pick a team sport to play at Chilton, Emily insists that Richard take Rory to the club and teach her golf. Although Rory tees off to a rocky start, she soon gets into the swing of things and has a great time walking and talking with Richard. Later, Lorelai's mixed feelings about Rory enjoying her time with Richard at the club provokes an intensely stupid argument with Rory, which is soon resolved when Lorelai realizes that she is not losing Rory to her parents. At the Independence Inn, Lorelai has her hands full overseeing all the preparations for an ornate double wedding ceremony and contending with a pair of spoiled and quarrelsome twin brides, their exhausted mother, their twin grooms, Michel, and the rest of her staff.
4	4	"The Deer Hunters"	Alan Myerson	Jed Seidel	October 26, 2000	226703	3.93
Rory receives the first "D" of her life, pushing her to study like crazy for the upcoming exam. She and Lorelai stay up all hours reviewing every detail about Shakespeare, only to over-sleep, causing Rory to miss the big test. Rory has a meltdown, telling off both Tristin and Paris in the process. Meanwhile, Lorelai meets Mr. Medina at the parent-teacher meeting and tells off the headmaster after Rory's meltdown.
5	5	"Cinnamon's Wake"	Michael Katleman	Daniel Palladino	November 2, 2000	226704	3.88
A distant family member dies but Lorelai has no recollection of the relative. At a Chilton bake sale, Max and Lorelai admit their feelings for one another. Lorelai, however, worries dating Rory's teacher might be inappropriate. Cinnamon, the neighbors' elderly cat, dies. Lorelai and Rory attend Cinnamon's titular wake, causing Lorelai to forget about her first date with Max. She and Babette talk about the difficulties of parenting and relationships. Rory and Dean's budding romance takes a step forward.
6	6	"Rory's Birthday Parties"	Sarah Pia Anderson	Amy Sherman-Palladino	November 9, 2000	226705	3.73
It is Rory's sixteenth birthday, so Emily and Lorelai each plan a party representative of their respective styles. Emily makes an effort to better understand Rory, much to Lorelai's delight. However, Emily invites all of Rory's Chilton classmates without consulting Rory. The resulting cold party atmosphere so upsets Rory that she argues with Emily. To make peace, Emily and Richard attend Lorelai's informal bash the next evening. They are caught off-guard by the colorful party guests. Emily tours the house, as she and Richard have never visited before, and learns Lorelai broke her leg three years ago and never told her parents. Emily sadly realizes she does not know her daughter at all. Dean gives Rory a birthday present.
7	7	"Kiss and Tell"	Rodman Flender	Jenji Kohan	November 16, 2000	226706	3.45
Dean gives Rory her first kiss, to which she responds, "Thank you," and then accidentally shoplifts a box of corn starch. Fearful of her mother's disapproval, Rory confides in Lane and decides not to tell Lorelai for a little while. As a result, Lorelai is distressed when she learns about the kiss from Mrs. Kim. She confronts Rory, who confesses about the awkward kiss. Later that night, Rory freaks out when Lorelai invites Dean over to watch Willy Wonka and the Chocolate Factory and eat junk food, but she ends up having a good time after all.
8	8	"Love and War and Snow"	Alan Myerson	Joan Binder Weiss	December 14, 2000	226707	3.80
The first snowfall prompts Lorelai and Max's first date. Lane is upset with Rory for being distracted by Chilton and Dean. Rory is snowed in with her grandparents and introduces them to frozen pizza. Meanwhile, Luke mocks and refuses to take part in the annual re-enactment of the Battle of Stars Hollow. Lane embarrasses herself in front of her crush, and goes to Lorelai's house looking for Rory. Lorelai brings Max home, but he sleeps on the couch when Lorelai discovers the distraught Lane. Rory returns home, apologizes to Lane for ignoring her, and contends with the idea that her mother might end up with someone other than her father.
9	9	"Rory's Dance"	Lesli Linka Glatter	Amy Sherman-Palladino	December 20, 2000	226708	3.62
Chilton hosts a dance, which Rory and Dean attend, thus confirming they are "boyfriend-girlfriend". Emily sleeps over at Lorelai's the night of the dance to care for Lorelai's injured back and see Rory off. After the dance, Rory and Dean accidentally fall asleep all night at Miss Patty's dance school. Emily and Lorelai wake up in a panic and fight over whether Rory will end up pregnant. Insisting Rory is a "good kid," Lorelai kicks Emily out. Rory arrives home at 5 a.m. and Lorelai plans to put her on the pill. Rory tearfully apologizes, but also accuses her mother for being so mad only because Emily was there to witness the mishap. NOTE: This special episode aired on Wednesday at 9/8c after Dawson's Creek.
10	10	"Forgiveness and Stuff"	Bethany Rooney	John Stephens	December 21, 2000	226709	3.60
Things are still chilly between Rory and Lorelai; Lane gives Rory advice about the right Christmas gift for Dean; Emily and Lorelai have a tiff about Christmas dinner, leaving Rory to go by herself; Dean and Lorelai patch things up; Luke makes a lonely Lorelai a Santa burger; Richard collapses and is rushed to the hospital; Luke gives a car-less Lorelai a ride to the hospital; relieved that Richard's collapse was only a bout of angina, the Gilmores settle their differences.
11	11	"Paris Is Burning"	David Petrarca	Joan Binder Weiss	January 11, 2001	226710	4.32
As Lorelai and Max grow closer, Rory begins to grow attached to the idea of Max in their lives, which freaks Lorelai out. Sookie and Lorelai have a frank talk about relationships. Lorelai tries to ease out of her relationship with Max during Parents' Day at Chilton, but ends up passionately kissing him in his classroom just as Paris walks by. Stung by the details in the newspapers about her parents' messy divorce, Paris tells everyone in the lunchroom about Max and Lorelai to deflect gossip away from her and towards Rory. Rory confronts Paris, gets an apology, and offers a sympathetic ear, which is grudgingly accepted. Sookie asks Jackson out on a date and he accepts.
12	12	"Double Date"	Lev L. Spiro	Amy Sherman-Palladino	January 18, 2001	226712	4.83
After Lorelai encourages Sookie to ask out Jackson, she finds herself on the double date from hell with Jackson's cousin, Rune, which makes Luke jealous enough to finally work up the courage to ask Lorelai out. Meanwhile, Rory and Lane get into trouble when they double date with Dean and his friend Todd without telling their moms.
13	13	"Concert Interruptus"	Bruce Seth Green	Elaine Arata	February 15, 2001	226711	3.16
Lorelai, Sookie, Rory, and Lane plan to attend The Bangles' concert, but when Lane's mother finds the truth, she bans her from going. Lorelai and Sookie offer up the three tickets so Rory can take Madeline, Louise, and Paris, which backfires when Madeline and Louise take off with two mysterious boys for a party.
14	14	"That Damn Donna Reed"	Michael Katleman	Daniel Palladino & Amy Sherman-Palladino	February 22, 2001	226715	3.51
An evening of "The Donna Reed Show" reruns infects Dean and both Gilmore Girls — Dean expresses a longing for the type of family represented by the show, Lorelai helps Luke spruce up the diner with a fresh paint job and new curtains, and Rory dresses up like Donna and fixes a 1950s style dinner for Dean while petsitting Babette's new kitten; when the baby chick that is the subject of Rory's midterm project gets loose in the house, Lorelai frantically calls Luke to help her search the house; both Sookie and Emily force Lorelai to confront her feelings for Luke; Christopher roars into town on his motorcycle, and agrees to stay at Lorelai's and Rory's during his visit.
15	15	"Christopher Returns"	Michael Katleman	Daniel Palladino	March 1, 2001	226713	3.67
Wanting to play a greater role in Rory's life, Christopher settles in for his visit and lets Rory give him the grand tour of Stars Hollow. When his parents arrive in Hartford for a visit, Emily invites everyone to Friday night dinner, which turns out to be an unqualified disaster after Richard nearly comes to blows with Christopher's father over critical comments about Lorelai. In the aftermath of the ruined dinner party, Richard retreats to his study to calm down, Emily makes a plate for Rory in the kitchen and reassures her how much she is loved and regarded, and Christopher finds Lorelai on the balcony of her old bedroom and comforts her by repeating a little romantic history. The next morning, Lorelai awakens with a start, horrified that she forgot to help Luke paint the diner after dinner on Friday night. Grabbing a jacket, she races to the diner still clad in her pajamas, and begs Luke's forgiveness. He shrugs it off at first, but appears somewhat wounded when he realizes that Lorelai was with Christopher the night before. When Lorelai returns to the house, Christopher asks her to marry him and she regretfully turns him down, claiming he is not ready for the responsibility of a family quite yet. Christopher returns to California with the promise of doing a better job of staying in touch. The next morning, Lorelai surprises Luke by having the diner completely repainted when he arrives to open up for the day.
16	16	"Star-Crossed Lovers and Other Strangers"	Lesli Linka Glatter	Story by : Joan Binder Weiss; Teleplay by : John Stephens & Linda Loiselle Guzik	March 8, 2001	226714	3.38
Luke's ex-girlfriend Rachel arrives in Stars Hollow unexpectedly, and immediately picks up on the attraction between Luke and Lorelai, which they deny. Rachel decides to stay for awhile, which leaves Luke and Lorelai with mixed feelings. Lorelai and Rory are amazed when Emily agrees to excuse Rory from Friday night dinner so that Rory and Dean can celebrate their three month anniversary. When Lorelai arrives for dinner, she discovers the source of Emily's largesse — her mother has invited another guest — a man with whom she secretly hopes to fix Lorelai up. After a painful dinner with one of the world's most boring men, Lorelai attempts to escape through the window of her old bedroom, but is caught in the act by Richard. When he is forced to admit that even he is bored by the man, he uncharacteristically covers for her and lets her make her getaway. Back in Stars Hollow, Dean treats Rory to a wonderfully romantic dinner, and then gives her a present: a car that he is restoring for her. As they sit in the car, Dean professes his love, but Rory is unsure how to respond.
17	17	"The Breakup, Part 2"	Nick Marck	Amy Sherman-Palladino	March 15, 2001	226716	4.17
Rory decides to engage in a flurry of activity to avoid thinking about Dean, despite Lorelai's advice to wallow; Lorelai runs interference as the residents of Stars Hollow reach out to console Rory and Luke attempts to bar Dean from the diner; Rachel pitches in to help Luke out at the diner; Jackson prepares dinner for Sookie, and has a tough time keeping her out of the kitchen; Rory decides to attend Madeline's party and takes Lane along for company; Lorelai decides to visit Max when she realizes how much she misses him; Lane is torn when she meets the perfect guy at the party; Rory attempts to befriend Tristin after he has very public breakup with his girlfriend at the party, and when he apologizes for his past bad behavior towards her and kisses her, she bursts into tears; at home, Rory sobs to Lorelai that she is ready to wallow now.
18	18	"The Third Lorelai"	Michael Katleman	Amy Sherman-Palladino	March 22, 2001	226717	4.57
Emily becomes unhinged at the prospect of a visit from Richard's mother Trix; Paris is outraged when she discovers that Tristin asked her for a date at Rory's urging; fearing that she'll never see Lorelai again, Emily opposes Trix's offer to set up a trust fund for Rory.
19	19	"Emily in Wonderland"	Perry Lang	John Stephens & Linda Loiselle Guzik	April 26, 2001	226718	3.37
Rachel finds an abandoned inn that Lorelai and Sookie fall in love with; Lorelai and Rachel spend the afternoon getting to know each other and Rachel asks Lorelai to put in a good word for her with Luke; as Rory takes Emily on a tour of Stars Hollow, Emily hits it off with Mrs. Kim and Michel, but becomes distraught when she sees Lorelai and Rory's first home; at Sookie's urging, Lorelai gives Jackson's cousin, Rune, a job at the Inn.
20	20	"P.S. I Lo..."	Lev L. Spiro	Elaine Arata & Joan Binder Weiss	May 3, 2001	226719	3.16
Lorelai helps Luke shop for a birthday present for Rachel and goes wild outfitting him with a new wardrobe; overwhelmed by sadness at her breakup with Dean, Rory is distressed to discover that Lane and Dean have become science project partners, and incensed to find out from Max that Lorelai has neglected to mention that they are dating again, so she argues with Lorelai and then takes off for Hartford to spend the night at her grandparents' house without telling her mother; when an angry Lorelai confronts Dean and discovers the truth about his breakup with Rory, she fears that she has taught Rory not to commit to a relationship.
21	21	"Love, Daisies and Troubadours"	Amy Sherman-Palladino	Daniel Palladino	May 10, 2001	226720	4.31
Paris wreaks her revenge after Tristan lies about going to a concert with Rory; Rachel leaves Stars Hollow after she becomes convinced that despite his protests, Luke is in love with Lorelai; Rory's defense of the Stars Hollow troubadour during a town meeting brings her back together with Dean, enabling her to finally say, and mean, the words that he has been longing to hear; Luke and Max meet and engage in a little not-so-friendly rivalry as Max begins to suspect, despite her protests, that Lorelai and Luke were once an item; Max proposes to Lorelai with a thousand yellow daisies.

== Reception ==
On Rotten Tomatoes, the first season holds a 90% approval rating based on 29 reviews, with an average rating of 7.9/10. The site's critical consensus reads, "Warm, cozy, and quirky, Gilmore Girls's two lead characters make the show a standout pick-me-up in the family-friendly genre." On Metacritic, the first season has a score of 81 out of 100, based on 26 reviews, indicating "universal acclaim".

Season	Season premiere	Season finale	TV season	Rank	Viewers (in millions)
1st	October 5, 2000	May 10, 2001	2000–2001	#126	3.6

== DVD release ==
The Complete First Season
Set details		Special features		
21 episodes; 6-disc set; 1.33:1 aspect ratio; Subtitles: English, Spanish and French; English (Dolby Digital 2 0 Surround)		Additional scenes; "Love and War and Snow"; "Forgiveness and Stuff"; "Emily in Wonderland"; "Welcome to the Gilmore Girls" – Making-of Documentary of the First Season; "Gilmore-isms Montage"; Gilmore Goodies & Gossip: On-Screen Factoids – "Rory's Dance"; "Guide to Gilmore-isms" booklet		
Release dates
North America	United Kingdom	Continental Europe	Norway	Australia
May 4, 2004	February 6, 2006	November 16, 2005	November 16, 2005	April 5, 2006
