= Concert Interruptus =

- Gilmore Girls episode
- Episode no.: Season 1 Episode 13
- Directed by: Bruce Seth Green
- Written by: Elaine Arata
- Production code: 226711
- Original air date: February 15, 2001
- Running time: 40 minutes

Guest appearances
- Liza Weil as Paris Geller; Shelly Cole as Madeline Lynn; Teal Redmann as Louise Grant; Melissa McCarthy as Sookie St. James; Emily Kuroda as Mrs. Kim; Liz Torres as Miss Patty; Chad Michael Murray as Tristan DuGray

Episode chronology
← Previous "Double Date"	Next → "That Damn Donna Reed"
- Gilmore Girls (season 1)

"Concert Interruptus" is the 13th episode of season 1 of Gilmore Girls. The episode premiered on February 15, 2001 on The WB. It features Rory going to a The Bangles concert with Paris, Madeline and Louise, and beginning to make friends with Paris, while Lorelai finds out about an ex-girlfriend of Luke's after buying one of the items he donates to the town's charity sale.

== Plot ==
Lorelai (Lauren Graham) has volunteered to store items for the town's charity clothing sale, and as a result her house is filled with donated items. Rory (Alexis Bledel) convinces her to give up much clothing from her wardrobe, but Lorelai cannot resist buying a sweatshirt with rhinestones that someone has donated. Sookie (Melissa McCarthy) arrives with four tickets to a The Bangles concert, for herself, Lorelai, Rory and Lane (Keiko Agena).

Luke is instantly furious when he sees Lorelai wearing the sweatshirt from the charity sale, and yells at her though Lorelai does not understand what she has done wrong. She talks about it later to Sookie and Miss Patty (Liz Torres), who think that it formerly belonged to Rachel, Luke's ex-girlfriend.

Rory has been put in a team with Paris (Liza Weil), Madeline (Shelly Cole) and Louise (Teal Redmann) for a history debate, much to Paris and Rory's annoyance. Tristan (Chad Michael Murray) flirts with Paris after class, saying that he wanted to be in a team with her. As no-one else's house is free, Rory suggests that they work at her house, despite its clutter. Lane initially asks her mother (Emily Kuroda) if she can go to a play with Lorelai, Rory and Sookie, but later admits that it is a rock concert, and Mrs. Kim will not allow her to go. Seeing the girls getting along, Lorelai suggests that Rory could go to the concert with Paris, Madeline and Louise. Rory agrees, and Lorelai buys cheap tickets with Sookie.

At the concert, Lorelai keeps asking Sookie questions about Rachel, leading Sookie to question whether she is interested in Luke. Meanwhile, Madeline and Louise leave the concert to go to a party with two boys who were sitting behind them. Paris enjoys the band's music and talks with Rory about why she likes Tristan. After the concert, Lorelai is enraged to discover the girls have run off, and they find the party and drag Madeline and Louise away from it, with Lorelai shouting at them. Later, Rory tells Lorelai that Paris gave her half the debating time, a sign of friendship, and Lorelai apologises to Luke about wearing Rachel's clothing.

== Analysis ==
"Concert Interruptus" develops the characters of Luke and Paris, both of whom were previously "grumps with rare moments of humanity". Along with the following episode, "That Damn Donna Reed", it advances the relationship between Lorelai and Luke in a way that previous episodes did not. However, the main focus of the episode is Paris' growth; Paris was previously only seen as a bully, with the exception of her storyline in "Paris is Burning". This episode is part of the development that leads Rory and Paris to become friends. We also see the relationship between Paris, Madeline and Louise in more detail: Paris is indifferent to their "borderline nuts" actions, and acts as a "worker bee" and "wet blanket" in the group's dynamic.

In Screwball Television, the author opines that Lorelai's clothing is an "extension of self". After Lorelai reluctantly gives away some of her clothing, she asks "Who wants cheese?", which can be seen as her experiencing separation anxiety and trying to cope with it by eating. J.M. Suarez comments that the episode is one of many to point out that "Lorelai's always a mother first", despite seeming "hip and young". Ritch Calvin notes that in the scene where Lorelai talks to Sookie and Miss Patty about Rachel, the focus of attention is on the clothing, and its ties to emotional memory, not the conversation.

== Reception ==
First airing on February 15, 2001 on The WB, the episode garnered 3.6 million viewers.

David Sims of The A.V. Club criticizes that "it's a bit of a stretch" for Rory and Lane to be interested in The Bangles, but praises Paris' apathetic reaction to her friends as "great to watch". Listed by J.M. Suarez on PopMatters as one of 20 Gilmore Girls episodes to "Make You Excited for the Revival", "Concert Interruptus" is praised for The Bangles' performance and scenes of Rory and Paris' growing friendship.

Out of the 153 episodes of Gilmore Girls, "Concert Interruptus" is ranked 115th by Paste and 140th by Vox.
