= Kill Me Now (disambiguation) =

"Kill Me Now" is an episode of Gilmore Girls.

Kill Me Now may also refer to:

- Kill Me Now, a 2012 film featuring Beck Bennett, Kyle Mooney, and Michael Swaim
- Kill Me Now, a 2014 play by Brad Fraser
- "Kill Me Now!", a track from Metal Gear Solid 2: Sons of Liberty Original Soundtrack (2001)
- "Kill Me Now", a song by Rio Grand from their 2006 album Painted Pony
- "Kill Me Now", a song by Ektomorf from their 2010 album Redemption
- Kill Me Now, a podcast by Judy Gold
