= The Lorelais' First Day at Chilton =

- Gilmore Girls episode
- Episode no.: Season 1 Episode 2
- Directed by: Arlene Sanford
- Written by: Amy Sherman-Palladino
- Original air date: October 12, 2000

Episode chronology
← Previous "Pilot"	Next → "Kill Me Now"

"The Lorelais' First Day At Chilton" is the second episode of the first season of the American comedy-drama series Gilmore Girls. It originally aired on the WB in the United States on October 12, 2000. The episode was written by series creator Amy Sherman-Palladino and directed by Arlene Sanford.

== Synopsis ==
Lorelai oversleeps on Rory's first day at Chilton and discovers that all her good clothes are in the cleaners. She throws on a tie-dyed top, Daisy Duke shorts, and cowboy boots. On the way to the headmaster's office, Lorelai meets Ian, the father of a Chilton student. Lorelai and Ian have some initial chemistry until Rory reminds Lorelai how she looks in her shorts and cowboy boots.

When Lorelai and Rory arrive at Headmaster Charleston's office, they find Emily, who has shown up for Rory's first day. Lorelai is coerced into removing her coat, and Emily and the Headmaster see her outfit. Both make judgmental expressions though refrain from saying anything about it. Lorelai and Emily leave after some awkward moments in the headmaster's office, bickering the entire way out.

Rory meets the school's office manager who tells Rory about the school's culture and obtaining extra credit in the course of her school day, including singing the school song in Latin. Rory begins to look apprehensive about what she has taken on. Meanwhile, a student volunteer working in the office hands Rory's file out the window to Paris, Madeline and Louise. Paris peruses Rory's file and attempts to downplay Rory's achievements, but it's clear that Paris is somewhat nervous about the new competitor to her academic successes.

Rory's day goes downhill from there. She is handed a three-inch binder containing one week's worth of notes from one class and meets some insufferable classmates including Paris Geller, who sees Rory as a rival and tells her that she is the smartest student, and Tristin, who teases Rory by incessantly calling her "Mary." Later, Rory ruins Paris's class project as she tries to open her locker and begins to answer questions Paris would usually answer, further provoking her rage.

Meanwhile, in Stars Hollow, Luke chastises Lorelai for her wardrobe choice. Later Ian, a man Lorelai met that morning at Chilton, comes by the Inn to ask her to dinner, but she declines because he is a "Chilton Dad."

At the end of the day, Lorelai picks Rory up from Chilton with coffee in hand, and they commiserate about their bad days.

== Cast ==
=== Starring ===
- Lauren Graham as Lorelai Gilmore
- Alexis Bledel as Rory Gilmore
- Melissa McCarthy as Sookie St. James
- Keiko Agena as Lane Kim
- Yanic Truesdale as Michel Gerard
- Scott Patterson as Luke Danes
- Kelly Bishop as Emily Gilmore
- Edward Herrmann as Richard Gilmore (special appearance by) (credit only)

=== Guest Starring ===
- Ted Rooney as Morey Dell
- Alex Borstein as Drella
- Sally Struthers as Babette Dell
- Liz Torres as Patricia "Miss Patty" LaCosta
- Jackson Douglas as Jackson Melville
- Dakin Matthews as Hanlin Charleston
- Chad Michael Murray as Tristin DuGray
- Liza Weil as Paris Geller
- Shelly Cole as Madeline Lynn
- Teal Redmann as Louise Grant
- Nick Chinlund as Ian Jack
- John Billingsley as Mr. Remmy

== Reception ==
While rewatching the series, David Sims of The A.V. Club wrote: "Of all the early season-one episodes that see Gilmore Girls finding its groove, this is definitely the weakest."
