= Kill Me Now =

- Gilmore Girls episode
- Episode no.: Season 1 Episode 3
- Directed by: Adam Nimoy
- Written by: Joanne Waters
- Original air date: October 19, 2000

Episode chronology
← Previous "The Lorelais' First Day At Chilton"	Next → "The Deer Hunters"

"Kill Me Now" is the third episode of the first season of the American comedy-drama series Gilmore Girls. It originally aired on the WB in the United States on October 19, 2000. The episode was written by Joanne Waters and directed by Adam Nimoy.

== Synopsis ==
When Rory announces that she has to pick a team sport to play at Chilton, Emily insists that Richard take Rory to the club and teach her golf. Although Rory tees off to a rocky start, she soon gets into the swing of things and has a great time walking and talking with Richard. Richard is impressed by Rory's taste in books, as are his friends at the club. Meanwhile, Lorelai feels jealous of Rory's growing relationship with her grandparents, culminating in an explosive argument between mother and daughter.

== Cast ==
- Scott Patterson as Luke Danes
- Melissa McCarthy as Sookie St. James
- Yanic Truesdale as Michel Gerard
- Lauren Graham as Lorelai Gilmore
- Alexis Bledel as Rory Gilmore
- Kelly Bishop as Emily Gilmore
- Edward Herrmann as Richard Gilmore

Recurring Roles

- Ted Rooney as Morey Dell
- Alex Borstein as Drella
- Sally Struthers as Babette Dell
- Liz Torres as Miss Patty
- Jackson Douglas as Jackson Melville

== Music ==
- "La Casa" by Graham Preskett / Mauricio Venegas
- "Teach Me Tonight" by Sammy Cahn & Gene de Paul
- "Here They Go" by Sam Phillips
- "Man! I Feel Like A Woman!" by Shania Twain
- "A Kiss to Build a Dream On" by Louis Armstrong
- "We Are Family" by Sister Sledge

== Reception ==
While rewatching the series, David Sims of The A.V. Club wrote: "In these very early episodes, Lorelai and Rory’s relationship has a volatility that doesn’t really stick around." He explained that the fight between Lorelai and Rory over something minor was "a little forced and on the nose." "The show is still finding its voice, and its tone feels a touch off at times, although it’s also establishing so much of what we know and love about the Stars Hollow universe. [...] Lorelai’s stuff [at the Inn] is pleasant, but a bit of a snooze. Rory’s plot is more intriguing."
