= Jose Yenque =

American actor

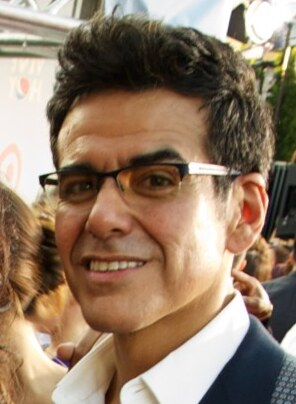
- Yenque in 2012
- Born: December 29, 1966 (age 59); Brooklyn, New York, U.S.
- Other name: J.R. Yenque
- Education: City-As-School High School; California State University San Marcos
- Occupation: Actor
- Years active: 1995–present
- Known for: Traffic; The Blue Diner
- Notable credits: Beginners; Miss Bala; All About the Money
- Mother: Teresa Yenque
- Awards: List of Awards
- Website: joseyenque.com

Jose Yenque is an American actor who appeared in the films The Blue Diner (2001), Miss Bala (2011), won an ALMA Award for his role in Traffic (2000), and an Imagen Award for his role in Between (2007).

== Personal life ==
Yenque was born in Brooklyn, New York City, to Peruvian immigrant parents. His mother is actress Teresa Yenque, and he took up acting as a teenager after she enrolled him in theater classes.

== Career ==
Yenque co-founded East Los Angeles Society of Film & Arts.

In 1995, Yenque did a play called El Cano with Ed Trucco. In 1999, on the set of The Blue Diner, Esra Gaffin said Yenque had prepped for a different role, mentioning he had the ability from previous roles to handle several types of firearms.

In 2001, Yenque and fellow actors Marisol Padilla Sanchez, Majandra Delfino, and Jacob Vargas won Outstanding Latino Cast in a Feature Film for Traffic at the ALMA Awards. In 2007, Yenque won Ambassador of the Year at the 11th International Hispanic Awards. He said that because the acting roles he was doing gave latinos bad representation, he began to donate money to a Tijuana orphanage. In 2012, he founded Arts for a Better Tomorrow, bringing change to orphanages in Baja California.

In 2020, Yenque helped raised funds during a virtual reading of Flowers Behind the Mountain by Barbara Bennion, benfiting the Artes Para un Mejor Mañana foundation. Yenque starred alongside Paco Mufote in Contratiempo.

== Filmography ==
Year	Title	Role	Notes
1997	Fall	Scasse	
2000	Traffic	Salazar Soldier	
2001	The Blue Diner	Tito	
2002	The Zeta Project	Security Guard (voice)	Episode: "The Wrong Morph"
2002–2003	Justice League	Copperhead (voice)	4 episodes
2004	Justice League Unlimited	Copperhead (voice)	Episode: "Kids' Stuff"
2004	Puños Rosas	German Corona	
2004	Wednesday Afternoon	Alberto	Short film, Student Academy Award winner
2005	Between	Det. Gustavo Campos	
2006	Broken	Luis Morales	
2006	Waist Deep	Agent Lopez	
2007	I Believe in America	Leo	
2010	Beginners	Robert	
2011	Miss Bala	Kike Camara	
2017	All About the Money	Juan Armando Garcia	
2022	Contratiempo	Taylor	

== Accolades ==
Event	Year	Title	Award	Result	Ref.
ALMA Award	2001	Traffic	Outstanding Latino Cast in a Feature Film	Won	
International Hispanic Awards	2007	—N/a	Sol Azteca Award – Ambassador of the Year	Won	
Maverick Movie Awards	2009	Bloom	Best Supporting Actor: Short	Nominated	
Highland Park Independent Film Festival	2010	—N/a	Humanitarian Award	Won	
HOLA Awards	2010	—N/a	HOLA Ilka Award of Humanitarian	Won	
California State University San Marcos	2011	—N/a	Doctorate of Fine Arts Honorary Degree	Won	
Imagen Awards	2007	Between	Best Supporting Actor - Television	Won	
Imagen Awards	2012	Miss Bala	Best Supporting Actor/Feature Film	Nominated	
