= The Blue Diner =

2001 film by Jan Egleson

- Theatrical poster
- Directed by: Jan Egleson
- Written by: Jan Egleson; Natatcha Estébanez
- Produced by: Natatcha Estébanez
- Starring: Lisa Vidal; William Marquez
- Cinematography: Teresa Medina
- Edited by: Jeanne Jordan
- Music by: Claudio Ragazzi
- Production company: Corporation for Public Broadcasting (CPB)
- Distributed by: First Look International
- Release date: March 16, 2001 (Mar del Plata Film Festival)
- Running time: 100 minutes
- Country: United States
- Language: English

The Blue Diner is a 2001 romantic comedy film directed and written by Jan Egleson. The producer Natatcha Estébanez also co-wrote and story and screenplay. Director Jan Egleson used excess film stock from the production of James Cameron's Titanic (1997). The movie was filmed in Boston, Massachusetts, USA.

== Premise ==
During a late night argument with her mother, Elena loses her ability to speak Spanish. This is caused by overwhelming stress. Elena's inability to reconcile with her mother. Her father has been gone since she was a very young child, and to top that off, now she feel caught between two men, a Latin artist named Tito, who has no Green Card, and her Irish-American boss, Brian. Elena turns to the Cuban proprietor of the Blue Diner for help.

== Cast ==
- Míriam Colón as Meche (as Miriam Colón)
- Lisa Vidal as Elena
- Jose Yenque as Tito
- William Marquez as Papo
- Virginia Rambal as Vika
- Jack Mulcahy as Brian
- Jaime Tirelli as Héctor
- Fidel Vicioso as Patricio
- Edouard DeSoto as Singer in Club
- Gustave Johnson as Museum security guard
- Teresa Yenque as Dog casket shopper
- René Sánchez as Don Benito
- Chuck Brinig as Theo
- Ken Cheeseman as Banker
- Lonnie Farmer as Lawyer
- Gamalier Gonzalez as the cleaning man
- Peter Kovner as Museum Director

== Awards ==
- In 2002 won the Outstanding Independent Motion Picture at the ALMA Awards. It tied with No Turning Back (film) for the honor.
