= Paris Geller =

Fictional character from "Gilmore Girls"

- Gilmore Girls character
- Liza Weil as Paris
- First appearance: "The Lorelais' First Day at Chilton" (Gilmore Girls)
- Last appearance: "Spring" (Gilmore Girls: A Year in the Life)
- Created by: Amy Sherman-Palladino and Gavin Polone
- Portrayed by: Liza Weil

In-universe information
- Full name: Paris Eustace Geller
- Occupation: Fertility doctor
- Family: Unnamed mother and father Jacob Geller (cousin); Gabriela McMaster-Geller (daughter); Timóteo McMaster-Geller (son)
- Spouse: Doyle McMaster (ex-husband)
- Significant others: Jamie (ex-boyfriend); Asher Fleming (boyfriend, deceased)
- Nationality: American
- Alma mater: Yale University (BA, BS); Harvard University (MD)

Paris Eustace Geller is a fictional character on the television series Gilmore Girls and its spin-off A Year in the Life, played by Liza Weil.

Paris is introduced as an ambitious high-school student from a wealthy Jewish family, who was raised almost entirely by her nanny. She has an extreme form of a Type A personality; she is driven and goes to any extreme to get what she wants, whether it be a high grade or a life goal, and is very disappointed in herself and others if she does not succeed. This is in stark contrast to her friend Rory Gilmore, who is much more relaxed and casual about most matters, and the only person close to Paris who can consistently pacify her. Paris's style of speaking is usually brash and matter-of-fact, and it is very rare that she lapses away from her usual tone.

Paris was conceived as a short-term character who would serve as Rory's foil and arch-nemesis in high school. However, the role was gradually developed by series creator Amy Sherman-Palladino and her husband/writing partner Dan, and Paris would remain for the entirety of the series while growing closer to Rory. Weil's performance won critical acclaim, with Paris becoming one of the show's most popular and topical characters.

== Introduction of Paris ==
Paris was originally created for a three-episode guest arc by series creator Amy Sherman-Palladino and executive producer Gavin Polone at the beginning of the show's first season to introduce Rory Gilmore's character to the high pressures, competitiveness and stress of going from the small public high school in Stars Hollow, to the storied and respected halls of Hartford's Chilton Academy. This character was created in consolation for Weil (who had been signed to a talent holding deal with show distributor Warner Bros. Television the year before, guest-starring through her arrangement on The West Wing and ER) after a strong audition for the role of Rory (Weil had previously been known to Polone through her work in the role of Debbie Kozac, a character who served a minor but pivotal role as a babysitter to Tom Witzky (Kevin Bacon)'s child in the 1999 film Stir of Echoes, which he and his company produced), which eventually went to Alexis Bledel. Weil, however, had to change her hair color to play Paris from her natural brown hair coloring to blonde. This was done to further the contrast of Paris to Rory. The character proved to be the proper foil to Rory in time, and the role of Paris in the show was extended and expanded through the first season until Weil became a series regular in the second season.

== Plot lines ==
=== Season 1 ===
On her first day at Chilton Academy, the soft-spoken Rory Gilmore meets the high-strung Paris Geller, who immediately views Rory as an academic rival. Prior to this encounter, Paris reads Rory's Stars Hollow transcript, courtesy of a student worker in the administration office she paid to sneak her the information out the window. The first day with the younger Gilmore ends up challenging Paris, and a few hours after giving Rory a lecture that she wouldn't make things easy, Rory accidentally broke Paris' castle project after tumbling into her because of a stuck locker. Paris refuses Rory's offered help to put it back together, and in spite the new girl answers lecture questions usually tackled by Paris right away.

Relations between the two remain frosty through their first semester as her crush Tristan gave more attention to Rory than to Paris, whom he considered a platonic friend. After Rory earns a D in a literature class as she tries to catch up with her classmates, Paris jokes bitterly the grade would be perfect to apply for work at McDonald's. Later, the comment would come back to haunt her as an annoyed Rory went off on her for calling her a "loser" during a test she failed to make due to oversleeping.

Paris' backstory is built with each episode after this point. She is forced by her mother to attend Rory's 16th birthday party thrown by her grandparents, and makes it clear she doesn't enjoy it. Later, she bumps into Rory at a college fair, and away from the pressures of school and Tristan, she opens up a little to the girl, discussing Harvard and how she hopes to go there one day because "ten generations of Gellers have gone to Harvard", as does Rory. Though they don't get along, they agree to disagree and be cordial to each other, noting that Harvard is a big campus and they probably would not see each other again after Chilton.

Her hidden crush on Tristan is a major theme for the first season, and as she sells tickets to the school's Winter Formal, tries to bring up the courage to ask him out when he tries to buy his tickets. However she backs off after he makes a flirty comment about her already having a date. She takes out that bitterness on Rory for not wanting him and yells at the girl as she buys her tickets, not realizing that Rory already has a boyfriend in the local new boy, Dean.

Because she needs a date for the Formal, she is forced after asking her mother to take her cousin Jacob as a date. Paris is able to keep it a secret for at least half the dance, until Jacob asks Rory if he could have her phone number and reveals his bloodline connection to Rory's rival. Though Rory doesn't say anything, Paris ends up jumping to conclusions and yells at Rory in front of all at the Formal in attendance, angered that Rory would divulge such secret information. However Rory had said nothing, and Paris unwittingly revealed her own secret.

Paris's parents then went through a nasty, messy divorce that was the talk of Chilton with many tabloid-like rumors of affairs and plastic surgery flying through the gossip mill, and despite her exceptional success at school, Paris' self-esteem suffered as her home was torn apart with Mrs. Geller replacing all reminders of her husband, and pushing Paris to bring up her self-esteem, be less introverted, and use makeup and topical medications to hide blemishes.

During this same period, she caught Max Medina, her literature teacher, passionately kissing Rory's mother Lorelai, and spread the gossip to assert herself over Rory and to take the heat off the negative attention she was receiving in the wake of the divorce. After Rory confronts Paris and asks her to explain why she's treating her the way she is when she was nothing but nice to Paris, she reveals some sorrow and guilt over spreading the news and speaks out about how the divorce has affected her. Knowing the girl was in a tough position, Rory tells Paris that if she needs help with anything, she can come to her and talk about anything she might need to.

The girls are then put together for a project in a government class (along with Madeline and Louise), and the four decide to use Rory's home in Stars Hollow as a meeting place for the project, which just happens to be at the same time Lorelai is organizing the town's rummage sale, filling the house with assorted clothes and merchandise. Madeline and Louise seem to want to befriend Rory and are yelled at several times by Paris to keep working, but keep going back to talking about Rory's relationship with Dean, annoying Paris to no end. Later, Lorelai gets an idea upon seeing Rory, Madeline and Louise bond, and invites all four girls to a Bangles concert in Manhattan. Paris declines to go, but is talked into it by her friends, and surprisingly enjoys the music and the band, and then enjoys the unwanted attention Madeline and Louise end up with after sneaking off with some boys to a party nearby, watching as Lorelai becomes authoritarian and lets it known that she won't allow any trouble around Rory. After all of this, she tells Rory that the evening was the best night of her life.

Slowly Paris and Rory become friendly toward each other, and Rory tries to help out the girl by asking Tristan to take her out on a date, then help her dress for it. The date seems to be a success, but Tristan remains focused on wanting Rory, and unwittingly reveals that Rory asked him to ask Paris out. She takes offense to this, and again they become distant, Tristan getting in the way of their friendship to the point where he spreads word at the end of the school year that he would take Rory to a PJ Harvey concert. Seemingly, this is the last straw for Paris, and she cuts Rory fully out of her peer circle, using her new power as editor of The Franklin, the school's newspaper to prevent the younger Gilmore from any advancement in position, assigning her to do a menial report about a parking lot paving project to start her Franklin career.

=== Season 2 ===
Eventually, Paris and Rory realize that they work better together than apart, and after a few more underhanded moves to annoy Rory away from her, Paris eventually accepts her as a friend and an unsaid co-editor on The Franklin. Also helping is the departure of Tristan for military school in North Carolina after he gets into trouble and falls in with a bad clique in the school over the summer, which culminates in a failed robbery of a safe belonging to the father of one of his new friends. As his departure took place mere moments from a performance of the last act of Romeo and Juliet Paris was producing, in which Tristan was to play Romeo and Rory, Juliet, Paris had to step in at the last second to don a male wig and portray Romeo.

After being encouraged to be more social, Rory then found herself about to get into one of Chilton's most prestigious sororities, The Puffs, which was led by one of Paris' rivals, Francie Jarvis. Paris had always wanted to get into this club too, as it ensured many guarantees for when she got into Harvard (which involved a show-created history where Sandra Day O'Connor was a member), and she asks Rory to put in a good word. Her plan works, and both girls find themselves about to be initiated into the Puffs (which involved a late-night burglary into Headmaster Charleston's office to ring a bell), when Charleston walked into his office with security mid-initiation, hastening the end of the Puffs.

Paris continues to allow her to be a friend, through many grade panics and frets through the rest of the season. She also finds Rory teasing her by not revealing her PSAT grade, which annoyed her to no end. She also ends up visiting Stars Hollow several times throughout the year, first as a guest at a holiday dinner at the Independence Inn which she enjoyed despite what she thought were anachronisms, trying to score a story for the Franklin about the town's supposedly hidden dark side (at least until Kirk curtains off every non-G-rated movie in the town's video store behind a Rory Curtain, which Paris immediately jumps on for a story), and in a grade panic.

With the departure of Tristan, there was no boy for Paris to be attracted to, and except for teasing a nerdy boy who got on her nerves sometimes (Brad Langford), she focused on her studies and building her college admissions chances. She also made a successful run for student body president in her senior year with Rory as her vice president towards the end of the season, and their reward is a two-month trip to Washington, DC for a Junior Leadership program.

=== Season 3 ===
The third season begins towards the end of the Washington trip, with Rory and Paris as roommates and becoming very close. Paris is revealed to be a sleep talker in slumber, having dreams aloud about Woodward and Bernstein of Watergate and Washington Post fame, then dreaming of herself as Bill Clinton during his denial of having an affair with Monica Lewinsky.

She finds romance at the conference with a boy named Jamie (Brandon Barash), who was often a partner with her in debates through the summer and took a liking to her assertive and commanding personality. This is proven as she tries to engage Senator Barbara Boxer (D-CA) in a debate, only to be passed onto a confused Rep. Doug Ose (R-CA) during a farewell luncheon.

During the same luncheon, Jamie asks her to have dinner with him to celebrate, and she subconsciously accepts. Upon realizing that she has an actual date, Paris receives help from Rory while preparing.

She later tries to hide the relationship from the gossip-happy circles of Chilton, and swears Rory to silence so she can date in peace. Rory, however, is forced to become a puppet to Paris' long-time rival in school and senior class president, Francie Jarvis. Francie had a vendetta against the two, thinking them the ones who had sabotaged the Puffs.

Rory finds herself accidentally divulging Paris's dating status during a secret meeting with Francie. The set up for the secret meeting between Rory and Francie and the subsequent disclosure to Paris is remarkably similar to one of the plot lines in the 1981 movie, Absence of Malice starring Paul Newman and Sally Field. When Paris discovers that her relationship to Jamie has been made public, she confronts Rory in a ferocious fencing match during gym class. Feeling betrayed by Rory's revelation (whom by this point, Paris considered her best friend), the two are divided once again.

Paris' family tradition was Harvard University (five generations according to her), and she had a complete meltdown on C-SPAN while she was supposed to be helping Rory deliver a co-written speech for the Chilton Bicentennial celebration in the wake of receiving a rejection letter from Harvard and losing her virginity to Jamie a few days earlier. Days before, Paris had told Rory first about her having sex, and the two reconciled, just in time as Rory was able to convince Paris that not getting into her dream college wasn't the end of the world. Rory, too, had intended to go to Harvard, but her infamous pro/con list came down on the side of Yale, partly because of Paris' rejection from the school, but mostly from the Gilmore family's Yale tradition.

Rory would outrank Paris as valedictorian and Brad Langford (Adam Wylie) outranked her as salutatorian for Chilton's Class of 2003. Nanny and the rest of her family would see Paris walk down the aisle to receive her diploma, and though Paris joked that Rory would see bad luck in order to numb the fact she wasn't first in her class, she eventually accepted the fact.

=== Season 4 ===
Rory walks into her Durfee Hall dormitory, surprised to find that not only has Paris decided to attend the school, but that Paris had her father exert his influence with the room assignments so that Paris and Rory would share a dorm. In their freshmen year they would share this room with two other girls, cross-country runner Janet Billings (Katie Walder) and Tana Schrick (Olivia Hack), a sixteen-year-old child prodigy. She also hires a life coach named Terrence to deal with her emotions when her nanny can no longer take care of her, and takes up arts and crafts in an attempt to deal with her anger issues through calm activities.

She ends her relationship suddenly and coldly with Jamie in the middle of her Yale freshman year, after commencing an affair with Professor Asher Fleming (Michael York) shortly after the Harvard-Yale Game. Professor Fleming was a sixty-year-old Yale literature professor and writer who was notorious for having flings and affairs with much younger women and was also a classmate of Rory's grandfather, Richard.

Paris also experiences spring break with Rory on an impromptu trip to Florida caused by awful weather conditions and drenching rain in New Haven. The two girls bonded even closer, with Paris paying for the whole trip and their odd way of spending a vacation that involved watching a marathon of the PBS miniseries The Power of Myth in their hotel room with pizza and assorted junk food. Paris still finds herself bored, however, and learning that Madeline and Louise (coincidentally in the same resort on their spring break) kiss each other to draw attention prompts her to kiss Rory square on the mouth, not only to show she can be wild, but to have Rory gauge her kissing style. Rory wouldn't elaborate, only saying that Paris was not her type.

She would become closer to Asher and fall in love with him despite Rory's frowning upon the relationship; still Rory helped her hide the relationship all year from the public.

=== Season 5 ===
Professor Fleming dies of a heart attack while he and Paris are at Oxford University over the summer. Being his last lover, Paris ends up becoming the executor of his estate, much to chagrin of the Fleming family, who clash with her at every opportunity. She would acquire a large antique printing press as her inheritance from him, and for a while displayed it in the common area of her dorm room.

In their sophomore year at Yale, Paris and Rory would share a dorm alone together, causing much discomfort for them both when either one of their boyfriends were present and they wanted individual privacy. In the middle of the fifth season, Paris started dating Doyle (Danny Strong), editor of the Yale Daily News after attempting speed dating and finding herself wanting more to talk to Doyle than the men at the event (Paris dismisses one of them upon hearing his first line of "Well I'm a drama major", by saying "Ding, ding, ding!!" to imitate the bell that ends a speed date). They would end up having sex hours later and start a relationship fraught with neurotic tendencies and competitiveness on both sides, but still love and mutual respect for one another.

=== Season 6 ===
Paris finds herself struggling upon the start of her junior year, due to her parents fleeing the country because of the IRS pursuing them on tax fraud and tax evasion charges, exhausting all of her funds except for those in her trust fund and her Yale tuition. This forces her to help Rory out by taking a job with a DAR event where she was a server and having to take small loans from her friend.

Rory later drops out of Yale due to personal frustrations. Afterward, an upset Paris goes to Lorelai for comfort several times throughout the summer, much to the derision of the Dragonfly Inn's staff, who consider her bossy and demanding. Lorelai continues to show sympathy for Paris, despite her intensity.

When Rory finally goes back to Yale, Paris shows indifference to the happy news of her friend getting back to her old, competitive self, knowing Rory would have eventually realized how much she missed school and how it would make her dreams come true, along with proving Logan's father wrong.

In the meantime, Paris becomes editor of the Yale Daily News, in preparation for Doyle's graduation, immediately instituting a quieter and less chaotic newsroom. The staff ends up resenting Paris's leadership and insists that Rory do something about her. Because of this grinding management style, the newspaper nearly misses a publication date, only making it to the press with a last-minute push by Rory to get it into the printer on time. In the end, the staff mutinies against Paris's behavior and chooses Rory as their new editor, ousting Paris.

Paris and her boyfriend Doyle move into an apartment building in a more urban part of New Haven at the start of the semester, and eventually let Rory live with them. Paris takes measures to protect herself, including several door locks and chains on her apartment door, burglar alarms, and Krav Maga self-defense classes. When Paris hears that she had been ousted and replaced by Rory as Editor, she throws out all of Rory's belongings in an act of spite, forcing Rory to move in with Logan. After a few weeks, Paris returns to the Daily News, feeling defeated and down. Rory sympathizes with her, and suggests that Paris turn an article she was writing into a week-long series.

When Rory learns that Logan has cheated on her, she leaves him and moves back in with Paris. Doyle moves out following a break-up with Paris, and the girls make up while enjoying television and Chinese food. They reconcile with their boyfriends in the following episode.

=== Season 7 ===
The final season of the series starts with Paris using the Daily News office for the summer to run her own test preparation service, called "The Paris Geller Yale Review", to help students pass standardized and admissions exams, like the services provided by The Princeton Review and Kaplan, because she wants to cut out the middleman and collect the fees that would have otherwise gone to the company itself.

She offers a position to Rory, who eventually takes on a student, and then they discuss Logan in London, with Paris warning he might stray without Rory nearby, going from past experience with Jamie and Logan's past with Rory.

As the last semester of Yale begins, Paris begins to push Rory to take several opportunities for grants, interviews and other things of interest with her outside of their given fields under the banner Operation Finish Line (referring to graduation), such as oceanography and a Goldman Sachs interview in order to add extra experiences to each of their resumes. Again, Paris uses a whiteboard system to keep track of these various items for both her and Rory. She also took up yoga with Doyle in pursuit of adding to her life experiences, surprisingly enjoying it in the end. Later, she was annoyed when Logan, disassociated from his father's business interests and as a result lost his apartment, moved in without prior notice.

After receiving a windfall of acceptance letters from both law and medical schools, Paris agonizes over the decision of which profession to choose, much less which school. She breaks up with Doyle because she is afraid to make a decision based on a relationship, but he insists that he will follow her, wherever Paris decides to go.

Paris decides to attend Harvard Medical School, and then tours India with Doyle over the summer. At graduation, she tells Rory she'll miss her, although Rory again notes no matter what, Paris always finds a way to get back into her life. She then tells her best friend that she'll go on to do great things, and both of them embrace in a hug a little tight at Rory's end. Paris and Rory then graduate from Yale.

=== A Year in the Life ===
In the revival, it was revealed that she went into reproductive medicine, running a successful surrogacy/fertility clinic in New York known as Dynasty Makers, which Lorelai and Luke visit while considering having a child of their own. She has two children of her own with Doyle; a girl, Gabriela, and a boy, Timóteo (likely named for the Brazilian city), though she is in the middle of a separation with Doyle (who has become a successful Hollywood screenwriter) over the course of her arc. She also still holds her crush on Tristan Dugrey, and upon seeing him from afar during a student day in Chilton, lashes out about not meeting the expectations of others. In an argument with Francie Jarvis a few moments later, it is revealed that she additionally passed the bar and has a law practice license, is an expert on classical architecture, and may also be a certified dental technician. She remains close to Rory, who occasionally rooms with her.

== In the media ==
=== Critical reception ===
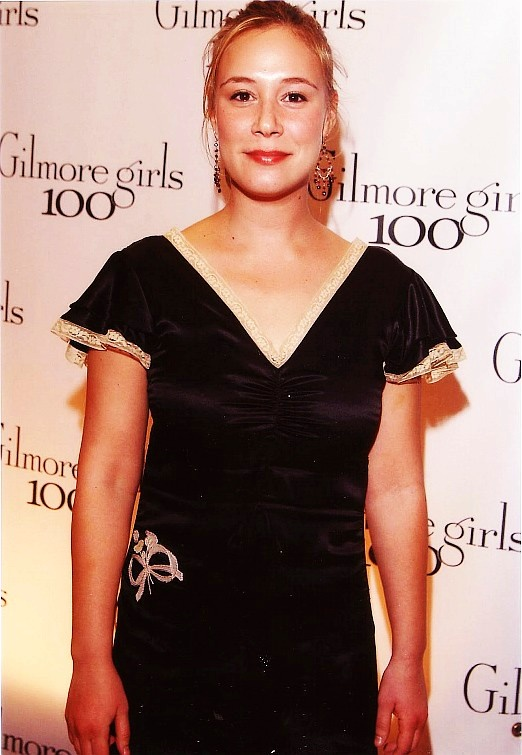
Liza Weil, who portrayed Paris

Paris has received a generally positive critical reception, with many critics feeling that she is most developed during the show's early seasons. Several writers have identified ambition as the core of Paris's character, noting that this creates a good deal of her wit, her resilience, and her eventual vulnerability as she bonds with others.

In an article for Vulture, writer Jackson McHenry noted, "With Paris, Gilmore Girls insisted that ambitious women are compelling in their very ambition." He described the character's struggles as "hilarious to watch", and declared that, in more dramatic scenes, "Paris tends to emerge from her challenges even stronger." While comparing Paris to Rory, Keely Flaherty of BuzzFeed felt that Paris's tribulations made her "a far more relatable heroine for the masses." Saba Hamedy of Mashable also found Paris's difficulties relatable, labeling the character "as real as it gets," and declaring her "the true heroine of Gilmore Girls."

Due to her competitive nature, Paris initially feels antipathy toward Rory, whom she eventually comes to respect and befriend. Both characters develop as a result of this bond, particularly Paris, who reveals a gentler, more vulnerable side around Rory. A review for Autostraddle.com noted, "As the seasons progressed, it became clear how much they actually needed each other to grow and become the strong women they were [supposed] to be. Rory needed to grow a backbone and Paris needed to view the world as something other than a big test you either fail or ace."

Critical reviews typically claim that Paris is less developed in the later seasons, during which her scenes become briefer and centered on the school newspaper. In a commentary for Deadspin, Hannah Keyser noted that Paris was most humanized "early in the show". Reviews from Vulture and Bustle have stated that Season 3 contains Paris's best material, citing her disappointments, resilience, and friendship with Rory, while Vanity Fair claimed that Season 4 features "grade-A Paris". While commenting on the character's later appearances, Keyser stated, "Sherman-Palladino, it seems, is about as interested in the non-Gilmores of fictional New England as the titular ladies themselves are—which is to say: not very."

Some critics chastised the producers for continually having Rory succeed where Paris fails, calling these developments unrealistic. Others have criticized the spin-off for making Tristan a source of Paris's distress during its second episode. In a review for Vogue, Patricia Garcia declared, "Paris Geller wouldn't even remember Tristan's name, much less still care about him." Kaitlyn Tiffany of The Verge concurred, noting, "Paris is 32 and wildly successful, and her crush, Tristan, was in seven episodes, max." Additionally, certain reviewers believe that Paris represents a closeted lesbian, with some chastising the writers for not presenting her as openly gay. Molly McGowan of Rogues Portal felt that Rory and Paris were "obviously" in love at various points of the series.

In a retrospective commentary, Brooke Camarda of Her Campus discussed Paris's determination, along with the layers it creates, stating, "Ambitious, painstaking, and brilliantly self-assured, Paris is the true MVP of the Gilmore Girls series."

=== Comparisons to real politicians ===
Numerous journalists have drawn comparisons between Paris and the candidates of the 2016 United States presidential election, with most citing a scene from the 2002 second-season finale of Gilmore Girls. During the episode, Paris runs for Student Body President and learns that many voters consider her the most qualified candidate, but are hesitant to elect her for personal reasons. Several members of the media felt that this story paralleled Democrat Hillary Clinton's situation during the 2016 race.

In 2017, Samantha Bee compared then-President Donald Trump to Paris Geller on an episode of TBS's Full Frontal, accusing him of showing favoritism in staffing choices. The Huffington Post responded, "We're not sure Paris ― who on the surface seemed pretentious, but was actually strong and caring ― would appreciate the comparison."

=== LGBT following ===
Paris is a fan-favorite character among the LGBT community and writers who have covered related topics, several of whom have wished to see her portrayed as a lesbian. Many writers note that she rarely has a long-term boyfriend, and affirm that her driven personality and powerful stature would represent the gay community well in a prominent work of fiction. In a review for AfterEllen, Trish Bendix stated, "Seriously, everything about Paris Geller is perfect. I love her. I want her to follow me around and yell at me about how stupid I am and how she could do everything better than I'm doing it and [then] have her angrily make out with me." Following the premiere of A Year in the Life, in which Paris undergoes a distinctive change in appearance, Autostraddle declared that the character had become "a queer icon." Reviewers from BuzzFeed concurred, calling Paris their "ultimate queer crush." Loco Mag labeled Paris "the most obvious choice for 'revival lesbian'." A review from The Niche noted, "Paris is far and away the most vivid, fully rendered, and realistic depiction of a lesbian that I have ever seen in any fictional medium," but declared that the show-runners "were actively trying not to portray Paris as a lesbian." Many writers have also expressed a specific interest in a romantic bond between Paris and Rory.

In a 2016 interview, series creator Amy Sherman-Palladino revealed that the WB network did not allow her to depict characters as gay when the show premiered.

=== Relationship with Rory Gilmore ===
Paris's most prominent relationship is with Rory, who is initially her rival before the two grow closer. Peggy Truong of Cosmopolitan declared that Paris was Rory's "true constant" in the series. Shirley Li of The Atlantic wrote an extensive commentary on the girls' friendship. Writers have also shown interest in a potential romantic relationship between the characters. The romance novel Tell Me How You Really Feel, by Aminah Mae Safi, was partly inspired by Paris's bond with Rory. In 2016, Cassie Sheets wrote an article for Pride.com titled "10 TV Gal Pals Who Should've Been More Than Friends", listing Paris and Rory at number 1. Daniel Mallory Ortberg of The Toast posted a detailed article on their potential as lovers, while BuzzFeed's Cassie Smyth called their bond "the greatest romance of the 21st century." Following the announcement of A Year in the Life, several journalists called for the creators to finally give Rory and Paris a committed romance.
