= Lisa Ann Hadley =

American actress (born 1970)

Lisa Ann Hadley (born January 11, 1970) is an American actress. She is best known for the role of Dr. Julie Devlin in the ABC daytime television soap opera Port Charles, which she played from 1997 to 2001.

== Early life ==
Hadley was born in Seattle and grew up in Arlington, Washington; she is the youngest of four children. She attended Pepperdine University achieving a BFA in theater and went on to study acting in New York and Los Angeles.

== Career ==
Hadley began in television in 1995 with a guest spot as a waitress in an episode of Partners. In the 1996–1997 season, she had recurring roles on both Hercules: The Legendary Journeys and Melrose Place. In 1997, Hadley was Marie in the short film Cusp. Hadley was Dr. Julie Devlin on the soap opera Port Charles. In 1999, she appeared as Taliah in the film The Lords of Los Angeles, and guest-starred as Merriam Rusk on the British-Canadian horror anthology television series The Hunger. Later that year, she appeared as a beautiful princess in a Honey Nut Cheerios cereal television commercial. From 2001 to 2002, Hadley had recurring roles on TV shows including Gilmore Girls, JAG, and Pasadena. In 2002, Hadley appeared in the films Infested and Dead Above Ground.

== Filmography ==
Year	Title	Role	Notes	Ref
1995	Partners	Waitress	1 episode	
1996	Jerry Maguire	Former girlfriend	Film	
1996–1997	Hercules: The Legendary Journeys	Queen Niobe	2 episodes	
1996–1997	Melrose Place	Beth Davis Howell	3 episodes	
1997	Cusp	Marie	Short film	
1997–2000	Port Charles	Dr. Julie Morris-Devlin	50 episodes	
1999	The Hunger	Merriam Rusk	1 episode	
1999	The Lords of Los Angeles	Taliah	Film	
2000	Celebrity	Justine	TV movie	
2001	Gilmore Girls	Rachel	5 episodes	
2001	Men, Women & Dogs	Heather	1 episode	
2002	Infested	Ellen	Film	
2002	Dead Above Ground	Dr. Brenda Boone	Film	
2002	Pasadena	Rachel Collins	2 episodes	
2002	JAG	Lt. Jorgenson	2 episodes	
2002	Any Day Now	Iris O'Neil	1 episode	
