= Yanic Truesdale =

Canadian actor (born 1970)

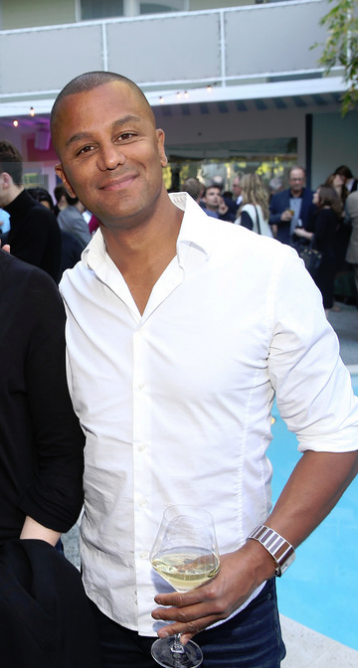
- Born: March 17, 1970 (age 56); Montreal, Quebec, Canada
- Occupation: Actor
- Years active: 1991–present

Yanic Truesdale (born March 17, 1970) is a Canadian-American actor best known for his portrayal of Michel Gerard in the television series Gilmore Girls.

== Early life and education ==
Truesdale was born and raised in Montreal. At 17 years old, he joined the National Theatre School of Canada and graduated at age 20.

== Career ==
One of Truesdale's first big breaks was a starring role in He Shoots, He Scores, a popular Canadian series about hockey. He went on to work for six years on the television series Les héritiers Duval, and in 1998 was nominated for his first Gemini Award for Best Acting - Comedy Series or Special for his performance in the sitcom Majeurs et vaccinés. The series was a critical hit throughout Canada, with Truesdale portraying the only Black child in a white family. Truesdale then starred in Mauvais Karma, which landed him his second Gemini nomination for Best Supporting Actor in a Comedy.

Truesdale moved to New York City and studied at the renowned Lee Strasberg Theatre Institute. Truesdale’s very first audition in Los Angeles was for Gilmore Girls, starring opposite Lauren Graham, Alexis Bledel and Melissa McCarthy as the opinionated, sarcastic, and good-hearted concierge of the Independence Inn, Michel Gerard. The role garnered Truesdale critical acclaim, landing him on the Variety 10 Actors to Watch list opposite Ryan Gosling and Jennifer Garner.

Additional recent credits for Truesdale include appearing in the award nominated film My Salinger Year opposite Sigourney Weaver and Margaret Qualley, which opened the Berlin Film Festival, Curb Your Enthusiasm for HBO (where he played Lin-Manuel Miranda’s agent), and is a part of the ongoing murder mystery franchise Fallen Angels Murder Club for Lifetime opposite Toni Braxton.

In 2022, Truesdale performed in the Netflix comedy series God's Favorite Idiot opposite Melissa McCarthy and Ben Falcone. God’s Favorite Idiot follows a mid level tech support employee who finds love with a co-worker at exactly the same time that he becomes the unwitting messenger of God.

In 2025, Truesdale reunited with Gilmore Girls creators Amy Sherman-Palladino and Daniel Palladino for their Amazon Prime series Étoile, appearing as Raphaël Marchand, colleague and confidant of the director of the fictional Le Ballet National in Paris, in all eight episodes of the show's first season.

== Personal life ==
Truesdale is the owner of indoor cycling studio, Spin Énergie in Montreal.

== Filmography ==
Film/TV
Year	Title	Role	Notes
1991	Lance et compte: Tous pour un	Joseph Brousseau	TV movie
1992	Prince Lazure	Michel	TV movie
1996	Majeurs et vaccinés	Philippe Tessier	Gemini Award Nomination – Best Acting: Comedy Series or Special
1996	Les héritiers Duval	Arsenio	2 episodes
1997	Un gars, une fille	Le guide / Le serveur	
1999	The Sentinel	Patrolman	
2003	See Jane Date	Noah	TV movie
2006	Tout sur moi	Yanick	
2000–2007	Gilmore Girls	Michel Gerard	Main role
2008	Rumours	Réjean (le comptable)	2 episodes
2012	Mauvais Karma	Yan Patrick	5 episodes Gemini Award Nomination – Best Supporting Actor: Comedy
2014	Mohawk Girls	Sex Shop Clerk	
2014–2015	La théorie du K.O.	Patrick	2 episodes
2015	The Fixer	FBI Agent Kincaid	Miniseries
2016	Gilmore Girls: A Year in the Life	Michel Gerard	Miniseries
2016	Sing It!	Beau Hemsworth	Web series; episode: "Let's be Real!"
2017	Curb Your Enthusiasm	Aaron	
2017	The Catch	The Cleaner	
2018	Christmas Catch	Ken	TV movie
2020	Love by Accident	Officer Paul	TV movie
2020	My Salinger Year	Max	
2020–2022	Les mecs	Étienne Lebeau	Main role 2023 Gemini Award Nomination - Best Actor: Comedy
2022	God's Favorite Idiot	Chamuel	Main role
2025	Étoile	Raphaël Marchand	Recurring role
2026	Murdoch Mysteries	Jean-Luc Leclerq	"Off-menu Murdoch"
