= Gilmore Girls =

American comedy TV series (2000–2007)

- Genre: Comedy drama; Family drama; slice-of-life
- Created by: Amy Sherman-Palladino
- Showrunners: Amy Sherman-Palladino (seasons 1–6); David S. Rosenthal (season 7)
- Starring: Lauren Graham; Alexis Bledel; Melissa McCarthy; Keiko Agena; Yanic Truesdale; Scott Patterson; Kelly Bishop; Edward Herrmann; Liza Weil; Jared Padalecki; Milo Ventimiglia; Sean Gunn; Chris Eigeman; Matt Czuchry
- Music by: Sam Phillips
- Opening theme: "Where You Lead" by Carole King and Louise Goffin
- Country of origin: United States
- Original language: English
- No. of seasons: 7
- No. of episodes: 153 (list of episodes)

Production
- Executive producers: Amy Sherman-Palladino; Daniel Palladino; Gavin Polone; David S. Rosenthal
- Producers: Chrisann Verges (pilot only); Mel Efros; Jenji Kohan; Patricia Fass Palmer; Sheila R. Lawrence; Rebecca Rand Kirschner; Helen Pai; Keith Eisner; Lauren Graham (season 7; episodes 12 to 22)
- Production location: Los Angeles
- Cinematography: Michael A. Price; John C. Flinn III
- Camera setup: Single-camera
- Running time: 39–45 minutes
- Production companies: Dorothy Parker Drank Here Productions; Hofflund/Polone; Warner Bros. Television

Original release
- Network: The WB
- Release: October 5, 2000 – May 9, 2006
- Network: The CW
- Release: September 26, 2006 – May 15, 2007

Related
- Gilmore Girls: A Year in the Life

Gilmore Girls is an American comedy drama television series created by Amy Sherman-Palladino. It stars Lauren Graham and Alexis Bledel as Lorelai and Rory Gilmore, a mother–daughter pair living in the fictional town of Stars Hollow, Connecticut. The series also stars an ensemble supporting cast, including Melissa McCarthy, Keiko Agena, Yanic Truesdale, Scott Patterson, Kelly Bishop, Edward Herrmann, Liza Weil, Jared Padalecki, Milo Ventimiglia, Sean Gunn, Chris Eigeman, and Matt Czuchry. It premiered on The WB on October 5, 2000, and ran for seven seasons, concluding on The CW on May 15, 2007.

Set in a close-knit community of eccentrics, the series blends elements of family drama, romance, and comedy. It follows the personal and professional lives of its central characters as they navigate relationships, ambitions, and generational differences. It is distinguished by its rapid dialogue, literary and pop-culture references, and portrayal of women's relationships across multiple generations. The writing and performances received widespread critical acclaim, and the series has been recognised for its humor, emotional depth, and exploration of themes such as independence, education, social class, and womanhood.

Gilmore Girls achieved strong ratings throughout its original broadcast, peaking in its fifth season as one of The WB's most popular series. Its audience and cultural influence have endured through syndication and streaming, particularly after becoming available on Netflix in 2014. The series has frequently been cited among the greatest television shows of all time by publications including Time and TV (The Book), and it is regarded as a cult classic of 2000s American television. In 2016, Sherman-Palladino and the original cast reunited for the four-part Netflix revival Gilmore Girls: A Year in the Life.

In 2026, Gilmore Girls was ranked #99 on the "100 Best TV Shows of the 21st Century" list as curated by The New York Times.

== Premise ==
Promotional portrait of Lorelai and Rory Gilmore

Gilmore Girls follows the lives of single mother Lorelai Gilmore (Lauren Graham) and her academically minded teenage daughter, Lorelai "Rory" Gilmore (Alexis Bledel), living in the quaint fictional town of Stars Hollow, Connecticut. Lorelai dreams of owning her own inn, and Rory plans to attend Harvard University.

The show's pilot introduces Lorelai's wealthy estranged parents, Emily (Kelly Bishop) and Richard Gilmore (Edward Herrmann), whom Lorelai must approach for assistance in paying Rory's tuition to attend the prestigious Chilton Preparatory School. It had been years since Lorelai had spoken to her parents after running away as a teenager following Rory's birth. They agree to a loan, on the condition that Lorelai and Rory have dinner with them every Friday. This arrangement sets up one of the show's primary conflicts, as the Gilmores are now forced to face their differences and complicated past.

They also deal with everyday triumphs and challenges in their love lives. Rory becomes interested in good-natured, new kid Dean Forester (Jared Padalecki) who becomes her first boyfriend before pursuing misunderstood, "bad boy" Jess Mariano (Milo Ventimiglia) and later charming, high society rebel Logan Huntzberger (Matt Czuchry) throughout the series. Lorelai also has challenges when dating as she still has feelings towards Rory's father Christopher Hayden (David Sutcliffe) who wants them to be together, briefly becomes engaged to the intelligent and charming teacher Max Medina (Scott Cohen) until she realizes the real love of her life is the diner owner and close friend Luke Danes (Scott Patterson).

Rory's best friend, Lane Kim (Keiko Agena), must conceal her "rebellious" interests from her authoritarian mother, Mrs. Kim (Emily Kuroda), a strict, religious, Korean immigrant, who runs an antique shop. She finds ways, many peculiar, to secretly date, listen to rock music, and express her love for pop culture, while Mrs. Kim repeatedly attempts to set her up with a Korean boy who will be a doctor. After many setups, Lane falls in love with a member of her band, Dave Rygalski (Adam Brody). Dave was written out in the following season to accommodate actor Adam Brody's exit for the hit television show The OC. Lane then began dating another band member, Zach Van Gerbig (Todd Lowe), eventually marrying and having twin boys.

Sookie St. James (Melissa McCarthy) is Lorelai's "best friend" and chef at the Independence Inn, which Lorelai runs. She has a bubbly personality and is accident-prone, but is known for her cooking skills. Later, she becomes romantically involved with the inn's vegetable supplier, Jackson Belleville (Jackson Douglas). They end up marrying and having children together.

Also central to Gilmore Girls is Luke Danes (Scott Patterson), owner of Luke's Diner, where Lorelai and Rory frequently dine. Present for many of Rory's milestones, he becomes a surrogate father figure to her. Later, Luke and Lorelai begin a romantic relationship. In A Year in the Life, Lorelai and Luke marry in the last episode, Fall.

The townspeople of Stars Hollow are a constant presence—including the gossiping, flirtatious Miss Patty (Liz Torres) and the quirky Kirk Gleason (Sean Gunn). Along with series-long and season-long arcs, Gilmore Girls is also episodic in nature, with mini-plots within each episode, such as town events, problems at Lorelai's inn, or school projects of Rory's.

== Episodes ==
Season	Episodes	Originally released		
Season	Episodes	First released	Last released	Network
1	21	October 5, 2000	May 10, 2001	The WB
2	22	October 9, 2001	May 21, 2002	The WB
3	22	September 24, 2002	May 20, 2003	The WB
4	22	September 23, 2003	May 18, 2004	The WB
5	22	September 21, 2004	May 17, 2005	The WB
6	22	September 13, 2005	May 9, 2006	The WB
7	22	September 26, 2006	May 15, 2007	The CW

== Cast and characters ==
=== Main ===
- Lauren Graham as Lorelai Gilmore: Independent, 32-year-old single mom who runs a local inn with a deep love for pop culture and coffee. She gave birth to Rory when she was 16 years old after getting pregnant by her high school sweetheart.
- Alexis Bledel as Rory Gilmore: Precocious and academically driven only daughter of Lorelai, almost 16 at the start of the show.
- Melissa McCarthy as Sookie St. James: Lorelai's chirpy best friend and chef at the inn.
- Keiko Agena as Lane Kim: Rory's best friend who lives a secret life, defying her strict, religious, Korean mother by becoming a rocker.
- Yanic Truesdale as Michel Gerard: The grumpy French concierge at Lorelai and Sookie's inn.
- Scott Patterson as Luke Danes: Grouchy but kind-hearted diner owner; Lorelai's friend and eventual love interest.
- Kelly Bishop as Emily Gilmore: Matriarch of the Gilmore family, who lives as a high society housewife. She and Lorelai have a strained relationship.
- Edward Herrmann as Richard Gilmore: Patriarch of the Gilmore family, who works in insurance. He and Emily aid in Rory's school fees and college fees. (Note: Credited as "special appearance by")
- Liza Weil as Paris Geller: Rory's feisty nemesis and eventual best friend throughout high school and college. (main seasons 2–7; recurring season 1)
- Jared Padalecki as Dean Forester: Rory's first boyfriend, who moved to Stars Hollow from Chicago. (main seasons 2–3; recurring seasons 1, 4–5)
- Milo Ventimiglia as Jess Mariano: Luke's troubled nephew who falls for Rory and becomes an intense but short-lived boyfriend. (main seasons 2–3; recurring season 4; guest season 6)
- Sean Gunn as Kirk Gleason: (Note: In the second episode of season one, "The Lorelais' First Day At Chilton", Gunn played a character named "Mick", who worked as a DSL installer. In the third episode, he played an unnamed character delivering swans at a wedding. He was then given the recurring role of Kirk.) Quirky resident of Stars Hollow who works numerous jobs around the town.
- Chris Eigeman as Jason Stiles: a boyfriend of Lorelai and short-lived business partner of Richard. (main season 4)
- Matt Czuchry as Logan Huntzberger: Rory's season 5–7 boyfriend, the heir of a New York Times-esque publishing family resembling that of the Ochs-Sulzberger family. (main seasons 6–7; recurring season 5)

=== Recurring ===
- Liz Torres as Patricia "Miss Patty" LaCosta, the friendly and kind-hearted town dance teacher and gossip.
- Emily Kuroda as Mrs. Kim, Lane's strict, Korean Seventh-day Adventist mother who has a strained relationship with her daughter.
- Sally Struthers as Babette Dell, Lorelai's eccentric but friendly neighbor and town gossip - she is close friends with Patty.
- Jackson Douglas as Jackson Belleville, Lorelai and Sookie's inn's food supplier and Sookie's eventual husband. (Note: Jackson's surname began as Melville and changed to Belleville later in the series, without explanation.) He and Sookie share two children, David and Martha, throughout the show.
- Michael Winters as Taylor Doose, the uptight town Selectman who often irrates Luke with his requests and rules.
- David Sutcliffe as Christopher Hayden, Rory's absent yet charming father and Lorelai's on-off love interest. (seasons 1–3; 5–7)
- Shelly Cole as Madeline Lynn, Paris and Rory's high school friend (seasons 1–4)
- Teal Redmann as Louise Grant, Paris and Rory's high school friend (seasons 1–4)
- Scott Cohen as Max Medina, Lorelei's first boyfriend on the show and Rory's English teacher at Chilton. (seasons 1–3)
- Chad Michael Murray as Tristin Dugray, a wealthy Chilton student who has a crush on Rory in high school. (season 1; guest season 2)
- Dakin Matthews as Hanlin Charleston, Headmaster of Chilton and friend of Richard and Emily (seasons 1–3, guest seasons 5 & 7)
- Marion Ross as Lorelai "Trix" Gilmore, Richard's mean, old-fashioned mother. (seasons 1; 3–4)
- Lisa Ann Hadley as Rachel, Luke's photographer and traveler ex-girlfriend. (season 1)
- Alex Borstein as Drella, the Independence Inn harpist (season 1), and "Miss Celine", Emily Gilmore's seamstress (season 5)
- Rose Abdoo as Gypsy, the town mechanic. (Note: Abdoo also played Emily's maid, Berta, in A Year in the Life.) (seasons 2–7)
- Carole King as Sophie Bloom, owner of Sophie's Music shop which Lane frequents. (seasons 2, 5–6)
- Biff Yeager as Tom, a Stars Hollow contractor. (seasons 2–4; 6)
- Emily Bergl as Francie Jarvis, a student at Chilton. (seasons 2–3)
- Todd Lowe as Zach Van Gerbig, Lane's bandmate and eventual boyfriend and husband. (seasons 3–7)
- John Cabrera as Brian Fuller, Lane's bandmate. (seasons 3–7)
- Tricia O'Kelley as Nicole Leahy, Luke's season 3–4 lawyer girlfriend and short-term wife. (seasons 3–4)
- Arielle Kebbel as Lindsay Lister, Dean's girlfriend and wife. (seasons 3–5)
- Adam Brody as Dave Rygalski, Lane's first boyfriend.
- Sebastian Bach as Gil, Lane's older bandmate. (seasons 4–7)
- Danny Strong as Doyle McMaster, Paris's boyfriend and one-time editor of the Yale Daily News (seasons 4–7)
- Kathleen Wilhoite as Liz Danes, Luke's flighty and irresponsible sister and Jess's mother (seasons 4–7)
- Michael DeLuise as TJ, Luke's dopey but kind-hearted brother-in-law (seasons 4–7)
- Wayne Wilcox as Marty, Rory's friend at Yale who has unrequited feelings for her (seasons 4–5; 7)
- Rini Bell as Lulu Kuschner, Kirk's girlfriend (seasons 4–7)
- Alan Loayza as Colin McCrae, Logan's wealthy friend (seasons 5–6)
- Tanc Sade as Finn, Logan's wealthy friend (seasons 5–6)
- Gregg Henry as Mitchum Huntzberger, Logan's father and a newspaper mogul (seasons 5–7)
- Vanessa Marano as April Nardini, Luke's "long lost" pre-teen daughter whom he finds out about in season 6 (seasons 6–7)
- Sherilyn Fenn as Anna Nardini, April's mother and Luke's ex-girlfriend (Note: In the twenty-first episode of season 3, "Here Comes the Sun", Fenn played a character named "Sasha", the girlfriend of Jess Mariano's estranged father as part of the Windward Circle backdoor pilot which did not go forward. Fenn did not return as Sasha but was given a part as Luke's daughter's mother, Anna Nardini, in seasons six and seven.) (seasons 6–7)
- Krysten Ritter as Lucy, Rory's friend (season 7)
- Michelle Ongkingco as Olivia Marquont, Rory's friend (season 7)

== Production ==
=== Background ===
I sold it off of a line, 'It's [a] mother and daughter and they're more like friends than mother and daughter.' And they all perked up and literally said, 'Great, we'll buy that.' I walked out of there and turned to my manager at the time and said, 'That's all I got. I don't know what the show is.'

— Amy Sherman-Palladino on her initial pitch to The WB

Amy Sherman-Palladino, who came from a background of writing for half-hour sitcoms, had Gilmore Girls approved by The WB after several of her previous pitches were turned down. On a whim, she suggested a show about a mother and daughter but had put little thought into the idea. Having to create a pilot, she drew inspiration for the show's setting of "Stars Hollow, Connecticut", after making a trip to Washington, Connecticut, where she stayed at the Mayflower Inn. She explained: "If I can make people feel this much of what I felt walking around this fairy town, I thought that would be wonderful ... At the time I was there, it was beautiful, it was magical, and it was a feeling of warmth and small-town camaraderie ... There was a longing for that in my own life, and I thought—that's something that I would really love to put out there." Stars Hollow was inspired by and is loosely based on the villages of Washington Depot, Connecticut; West Hartford, Connecticut, and the town of New Milford.

Once the setting was established, Gilmore Girls developed as a mixture of sitcom and family drama. Sherman-Palladino's aim was to create "A family show that doesn't make parents want to stick something sharp in their eyes while they're watching it and doesn't talk down to kids." She wanted the family dynamic to be important because "It's a constant evolution ... You never run out of conflict." The show's pace, dialogue, and focus on class divisions was heavily inspired by the screwball comedies of the 1930s and Katharine Hepburn and Spencer Tracy films. Sherman-Palladino was also influenced by the "acerbic wit" of Dorothy Parker.

The pilot episode of Gilmore Girls received financial support from the script development fund of the Family Friendly Programming Forum, which includes some of the nation's leading advertisers, making it one of the first networks shows to reach the air with such funding. The show was green-lit by The WB, and Sherman-Palladino exercised control over all aspects of its production. Her husband Daniel Palladino was a consultant and occasional writer for the first season, then agreed to quit his producer position on Family Guy to commit to Gilmore Girls; he became an executive producer with the second season and also played a major role. The show's third executive producer was Gavin Polone.

=== Casting ===
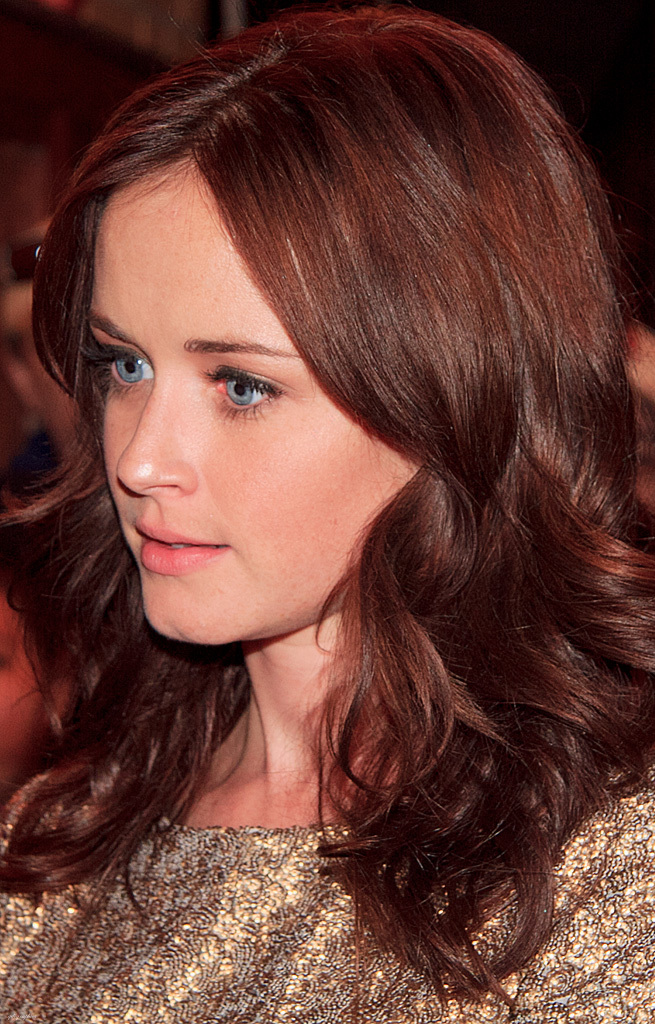
Alexis Bledel's first acting job was playing Rory Gilmore.

Alexis Bledel was cast as Rory despite having no previous acting experience. Sherman-Palladino was drawn to her shyness and innocence, which she said was essential for the character, and felt she photographed well. Lauren Graham was pursued by the casting directors from the start of the process, but she was committed to another show on NBC. A week before the shooting, they had still failed to cast Lorelai, so they asked Graham to audition anyway. Sherman-Palladino cast her that day, on the hope that Graham's other show (M.Y.O.B., which was burned off as a summer replacement series several months before the premiere of Gilmore Girls) would be canceled, which it soon was. She later explained how Graham met all the criteria she had been looking for: "Lorelai's a hard fucking part. You've got to be funny, you've got to talk really fucking fast, you've got to be able to act, you've got to be sexy, but not scary sexy. You've got to be strong, but not like 'I hate men'". Graham and Bledel met the night before they started filming the pilot.

In casting the grandparents, Sherman-Palladino had veteran actor Edward Herrmann in mind for Richard and was delighted when he agreed. Kelly Bishop, a fellow New York stage actress, was cast straight after her audition; Sherman-Palladino recalled knowing immediately "and there's Emily". Herrmann and Bishop were both Tony Award recipients in 1976. The Stars Hollow diner owner was originally a woman, but the network said it needed more men and Scott Patterson was cast as Luke. It was advertised as a guest role, but Patterson said he treated the pilot as "a chemistry test" and he was promoted to series regular.

In the pilot, Sookie was played by Alex Borstein, but she could not be released from her Mad TV contract. She was replaced by Melissa McCarthy, who refilmed Sookie's scenes. The role of Dean also changed after the pilot, with the original actor replaced by newcomer Jared Padalecki. Lane was based on Sherman-Palladino's friend and fellow producer Helen Pai; Japanese-American actress Keiko Agena was cast in the role when they could not find an appropriate Korean-American actress. Liza Weil auditioned to play Rory, and while she was considered wrong for the part Sherman-Palladino liked her so much that she wrote the role of Paris especially for her.

=== Writing ===
Headed by Amy Sherman-Palladino and Daniel Palladino from seasons 1 to 6, Gilmore Girls had a small writing staff that changed regularly throughout the series. The Palladinos wrote most episodes and reviewed and reworked the dialogue in episodes allocated to others. As such, the show is considered to have a distinctive "voice". Sherman-Palladino said "every draft either I write, or it passes through my hands ... so that there is a consistency of tone. It's very important that it feels like the same show every week because it is so verbal." The main job of the writers' room was to help develop storylines and create detailed episode outlines. Notable writers who worked on the show include Jenji Kohan, Bill Prady, Jane Espenson, Rebecca Rand Kirshner, and Janet Leahy.

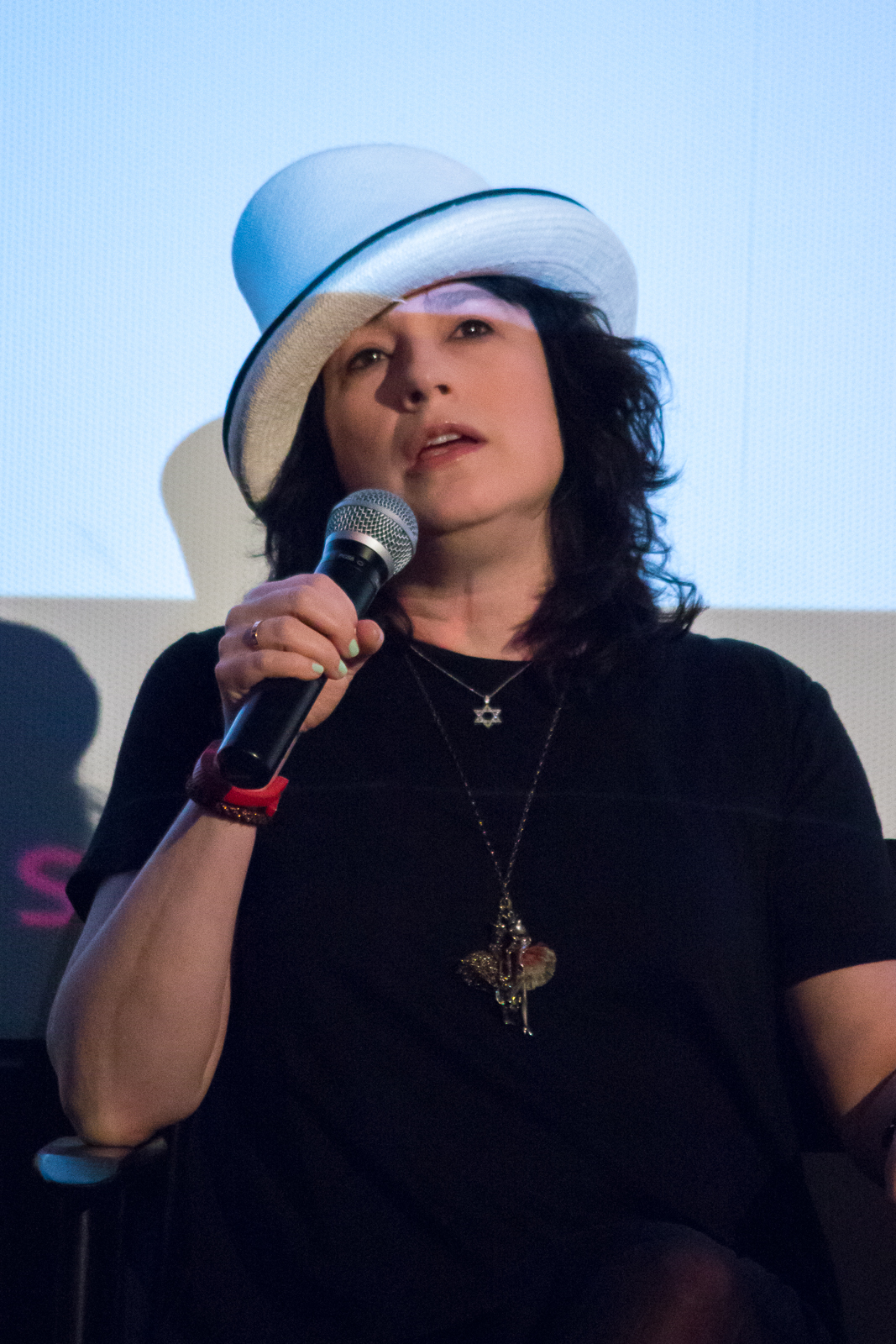
Gilmore Girls creator and showrunner, Amy Sherman-Palladino

As signaled by its tagline "Life's short. Talk fast", Gilmore Girls is known for its fast-paced dialogue and "witty repartee". Sherman-Palladino wanted snappy delivery from the characters because she believes that "comedy dies slow", which required large volumes of dialogue to fill the hour-long time slot. Scripts averaged 80 pages per episode, compared to an "hour-long" average of 55–60 pages, with one page translating to 20–25 seconds of screen time. Patterson later said that the pace of the dialogue led both him and Graham to quit smoking: "She needed her wind, and I needed my wind."

Much of the dialogue is peppered with references to film, television shows, music, literature, and celebrity culture. The range of references is broad, summarized by critic Ken Tucker as "some cross between Mystery Science Theater 3000 and Ulysses". Sherman-Palladino wanted the characters to speak this way to indicate their worldliness and intelligence, and to cater to a broad audience. At the start, she argued with the network about the frequently old-fashioned references; when she refused to remove a comment about Oscar Levant, she felt the executives adopted an attitude of "Let the crazy woman dig her own grave." The relative obscurity of some of the allusions resulted in explanatory "Gilmore-isms" booklets being included in the DVD sets of the first four seasons.

In contrast to the rapid-fire dialogue, the storylines move slowly. Sherman-Palladino's motto was "make the small big, make the big small", which she learned while writing for Roseanne. She chose to be "very stingy with events", and the drama is low-key because "sometimes the average everyday things are more impactful". Key incidents often take place off-screen and are only revealed through character conversations, which journalist Constance Grady says is because "On Gilmore Girls, the explosion is never what matters: It's the fallout." The show similarly uses subtext rather than exposition, "where people will talk a great deal in order to obscure what they really mean to say". The writers did not like overly sentimental moments, preferring that characters show love through actions and behavior. Sherman-Palladino said the network did not interfere or request changes, though there is speculation that she delivered scripts at the last minute to avoid its input. (Note: For the 2003–2004 television season, Gilmore Girls was criticised by the Directors Guild of America for not delivering a single script on time.)

Sherman-Palladino treated Lorelai as a reflection of herself. Her husband said: "Amy writing for Lorelai Gilmore has always been really special. No surprise, they're kind of doppelgängers ... Amy and Lorelai are very, very similar. That character is a great cipher for a lot of what Amy is and has been, from the very beginning."

=== Filming ===
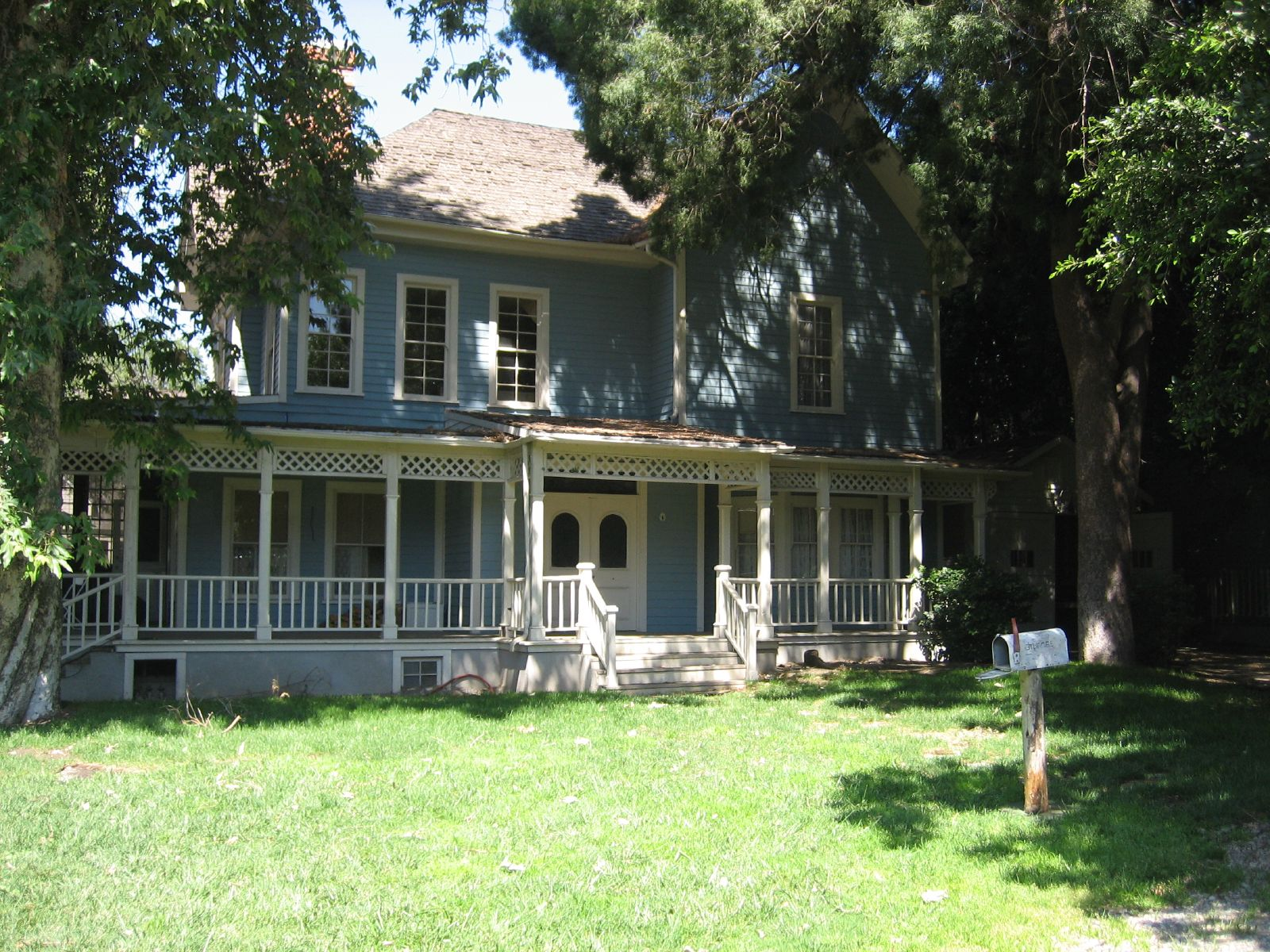
Exterior of Lorelai and Rory's house, on the Warner Bros. backlot

The pilot episode was shot in the Toronto suburb of Unionville. The rest of the series was filmed at the Warner Bros. lot in Burbank, California. Exterior scenes of Stars Hollow, along with those at Luke's Diner and Miss Patty's dance studio, were all filmed on the backlot—with dozens of background actors to make it look like a town. Production designers regularly decorated the town square with fake leaves or fake snow to make it look like a New England fall or winter. Interiors of Lorelai's house and inn, and all scenes at Yale and the Gilmore mansion, were filmed on a sound stage. Very occasionally, the show was filmed on location. The exterior shots of Rory's preparatory school, Chilton, were filmed at Greystone Mansion in Beverly Hills, California. Rory's visit to Harvard was filmed at UCLA, the first visit to Yale was filmed at Pomona College, and subsequent Yale shots were filmed at sound stages in Burbank, California, and USC.

The shot of Stars Hollow in the first frame of the show's opening credits is actually a panoramic view of South Royalton, Vermont.

Gilmore Girls relied on a master shot filming style, in which a scene is filmed to frame characters and their dialogue together within a long and uninterrupted single take; often illustrated through another method regularly employed on the show, the walk and talk. Sherman-Palladino said, "There's an energy and style to our show that's very simple, in my mind ... [it] almost needs to be shot like a play. That's how we get our pace, our energy, and our flow ... I don't think it could work any other way."

It took eight working days to shoot an episode, and days were regularly 14–20 hours long. Graham said: "We filmed alongside The West Wing, and Aaron Sorkin shows are known for having the worst hours ever, they go on and on, but we were always there even after they had gone home, because you couldn't change a word of the script." The cast was required to be word-perfect in every scene while also reciting large amounts of dialogue at speed. Matt Czuchry, who had a main role for the final three seasons, said, "The pace of the dialogue was what made that show incredibly unique, and also incredibly difficult as an actor. To be able to maintain that speed, tone, and at the same time, try to make layered choices was a great experience to have early in my career. It really challenged me." The combination of the difficult dialogue and long takes meant each scene had to be shot many times; Graham said in 2015: "never before or since have I done as many takes of anything". Bledel recalled that one scene required 38 takes. Graham added, "That show—as fun and breezy and light as it is—is technically really challenging."

=== Music ===
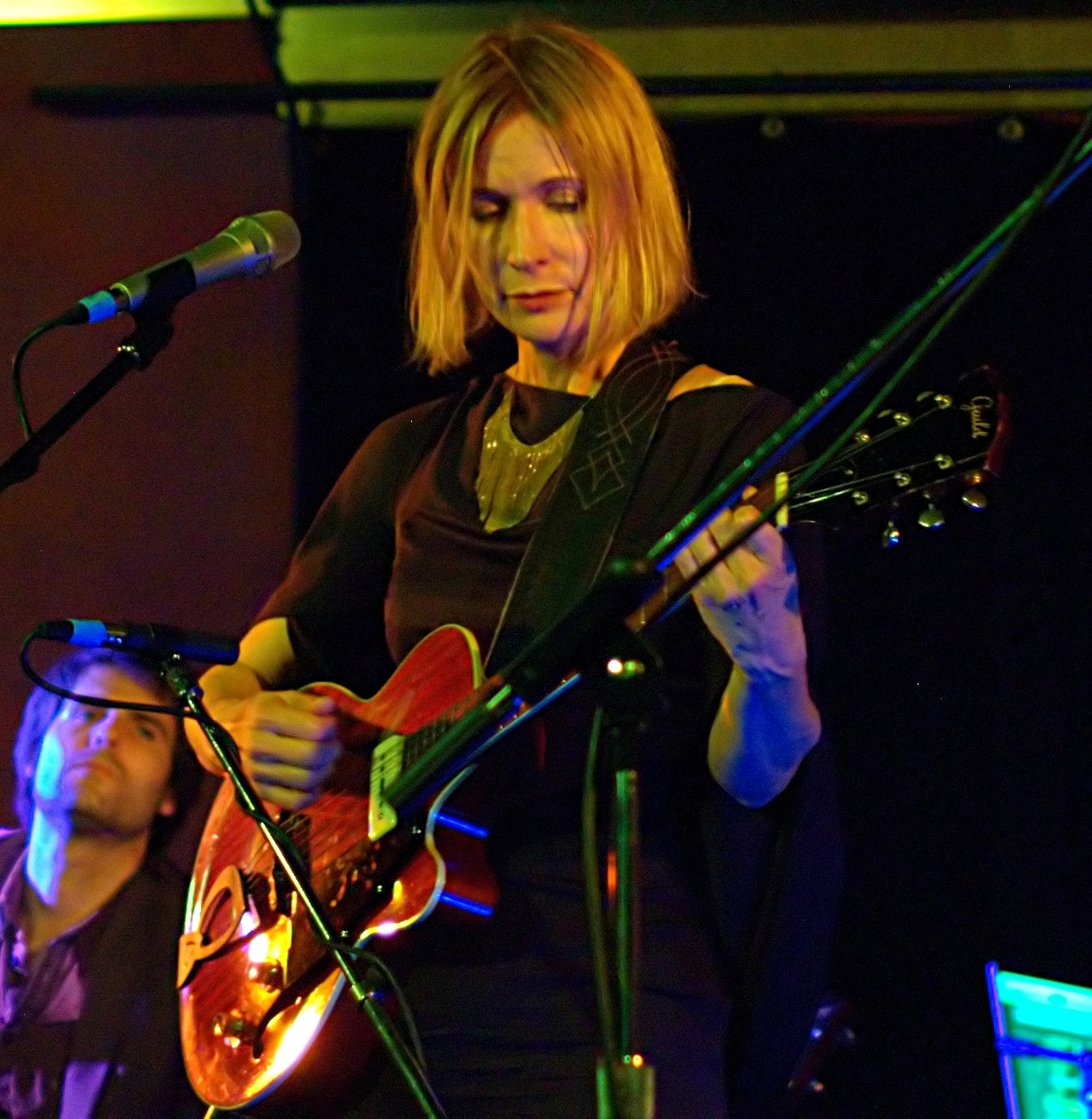
Singer-songwriter Sam Phillips composed the Gilmore Girls musical score.

Gilmore Girls' non-diegetic score was composed by singer-songwriter Sam Phillips throughout its entire run. Sherman-Palladino, who served as the music supervisor of the series, was a big fan of hers and secured her involvement. For the score's instrumental arrangement, Phillips primarily used her voice and an acoustic guitar, and on occasion included piano, violin, and drums. Many of the musical cues are accompanied by melodic "la-la"s and "ahh"s, which developed because Sherman-Palladino wanted the score to sound connected to the girls themselves, almost like "an extension of their thoughts ... if they had music going in their head during a certain emotional thing in their life." Sherman-Palladino felt the score elevated the series "because it wasn't a wasted element in the show. Everything was trying to say a little something, add a little something to it." Several of Phillips's album tracks are also played in the show, and she made an appearance in the season six finale "Partings", performing part of "Taking Pictures".

The theme song is a version of Carole King's 1971 song "Where You Lead". King made a new recording specially for Gilmore Girls: a duet with her daughter Louise Goffin. She was happy that it gave the song "a deeper meaning of love between a mother and her child". King appeared in several episodes as Sophie, the town music shop owner, and performed a brief portion of her song "I Feel the Earth Move" in the revival.

Music also plays a large part in the show as a frequent topic of conversation between characters and in live performances within scenes and at the end of episodes. Musical acts that made appearances include The Bangles, Sonic Youth, Sparks, and the Shins. Grant-Lee Phillips appears in at least one episode per season as the town's troubadour, singing his own songs and covers. In 2002, a Gilmore Girls soundtrack was released by Rhino Records, titled Our Little Corner of the World: Music from Gilmore Girls. The CD booklet features anecdotes from show producers Amy Sherman-Palladino and Daniel Palladino about the large part music has played in their lives.

A selection of Phillips's score for the series was released on the Mutant label, in association with Warner Bros' WaterTower Music, in November 2025 on vinyl, cassette, CD and streaming platforms.

=== Track listing ===
No.	Title	Length
1.	"Happy"	0:51
2.	"Getting Married (Suite)"	3:36
3.	"Where The Colors Don't Go"	3:01
4.	"How Much Longer"	0:53
5.	"Go (Suite)"	4:04
6.	"Watching"	0:59
7.	"Luke's Window"	1:18
8.	"Shoo & Bad Bird"	0:47
9.	"Maybe Next Week (Suite)"	3:54
10.	"Taking Pictures"	0:51
11.	"Large Clouds"	0:39
12.	"Sad Dog"	1:33
13.	"Popcorn (Suite)"	5:32
14.	"If I Could Write"	2:18
15.	"Night Vocal Band"	0:51
16.	"Book (Suite)"	3:08
17.	"Alternate"	0:36
18.	"Reflecting Light"	3:17
Total length:		38:16

== Developments ==
=== Change of showrunner ===
In 2006, the WB merged with UPN to form a new network, The CW. Gilmore Girls survived the merger, selected as one of seven WB shows to be transferred for a new season, but it resulted in a significant change. In April that year, it was announced that Sherman-Palladino and her husband could not reach an agreement with The CW and would leave the show when their contracts expired that summer. Journalist Michael Ausiello said of the decision: "The thought of Gilmore Girls heading into what is likely to be its final season (and its first on a brand-new network) without its mama or her right-hand man is unfathomable." Discussing the departure later, Sherman-Palladino reflected on the contract dispute in an interview with Vulture, saying:

It was a botched negotiation. It really was about the fact that I was working too much. I was going to be the crazy person who was locked in my house and never came out. I heard a lot of 'Amy doesn't need a writing staff because she and Dan Palladino write everything!' I thought, That's a great mentality on your part, but if you want to keep the show going for two more years, let me hire more writers. By the way, all this shit we asked for? They had to do [it] anyway when we left. They hired this big writing staff and a producer-director onstage. That's what bugged me the most. They wound up having to do what we'd asked for anyway, and I wasn't there.

David S. Rosenthal, who worked on the show as a writer and producer for season 6, was selected by Sherman-Palladino to replace her as showrunner. Commenting on this change, an article in Wired says: "the Palladinos had written the majority of the episodes up to that point, and their distinctive rhythms and obsessions were what defined Gilmore Girls. What remains after their departure is something that seems like Gilmore Girls Adjacent more than anything."

=== Cancellation ===
There was speculation during the seventh season that it would be the show's final year, as Graham's and Bledel's contracts were both coming to an end. As negotiations continued between the actresses and the network, Rosenthal planned a finale that "could serve as an ending or a beginning of a new chapter and a new season". Graham later said that by the end of the filming schedule "there was a 50/50 chance we'd be returning", and she requested that the finale provide "an opportunity to say goodbye" to the characters, in case of cancellation. Due to the uncertainty, the cast and crew did not have a final wrap party or an opportunity to say farewells.

The CW initially considered bringing the show back for a shortened, 13-episode season, but decided against it. On May 3, 2007, shortly before the final episode aired, the network announced that the series would not be renewed. Graham said the possibility of returning fell through because "We were trying to find a way we [she and Bledel] could have a slightly easier schedule, and there was really no way to do that and still have it be Gilmore Girls."

=== Revival ===
Official Netflix title announcement for the 2016 revival miniseries

Because the final season was not written by the series creator, and the new writers had not known that the finale was definitely the last episode, Graham noted that many fans "were disappointed with how it ended". In 2009, Sherman-Palladino expressed interest in a Gilmore Girls film, to finish the series as she originally intended. Over the following years, fans and journalists continued to ask if the show would return. Privately, Sherman-Palladino stayed in contact with Graham, Bledel, Patterson, and Bishop to discuss the possibility, but nothing came to fruition.

In June 2015, for the 15th anniversary of the show, the cast and showrunners reunited for a special panel at the ATX Television Festival. When asked about a possible revival, Sherman-Palladino told the audience "I'm sorry, there's nothing in the works at the moment." The hype generated by the reunion, however, empowered Sherman-Palladino to pitch new episodes and encouraged Netflix to produce them. In October 2015 – eight years after the show had ended – TVLine reported that the streaming channel struck a deal with Warner Bros to revive the series in a limited run, consisting of four 90-minute episodes, written and directed by Amy Sherman-Palladino and Daniel Palladino. The Palladinos explained that it felt like the right time creatively to continue the story, and that the freedom provided by Netflix made it possible.

The revival miniseries, titled Gilmore Girls: A Year in the Life, was filmed from February to May 2016. Aside from Edward Herrmann, who died two years prior, every cast member who received a main credit on the show returned for at least a scene, while many supporting characters also made an appearance. The sets all had to be rebuilt from scratch, using nothing but photos and footage from the original series. The revival was released on Netflix on November 25, 2016, to positive reviews. There is speculation regarding a possible second revival, with Netflix reportedly keen.

== Broadcast history ==
Gilmore Girls' first season commenced on The WB in the Thursday 8pm/7pm Central time slot, as a lead-in for Charmed. Renewed for a second season, the show was relocated on Tuesdays 8pm/7pm, the time slot of Buffy the Vampire Slayer, which transferred to UPN, and served as a lead-in for Smallville, which became an instant hit and always beat Gilmore Girls in the ratings. During seasons 4 and 5, it led into One Tree Hill, which slowly became a hit. In season 6, it led into Supernatural, which became another hit for The WB and continued on until 2020. Both series were led by former Gilmore Girls actors, with One Tree Hill starring Chad Michael Murray, and Jared Padalecki as a co-star in Supernatural.

First-season reruns aired on Monday nights from March 5 until April 9, 2001, during a mid-season hiatus of Roswell, to build audience awareness of the series. An additional run of the first season aired in 2002 on Sunday nights under the title Gilmore Girls Beginnings (which featured a modified opening sequence voiced with a monologue detailing the premise from Graham), and was one of two shows on The WB to have "Beginnings" in its title for reruns, along with 7th Heaven.

=== Syndication ===
In the US, the show began its syndicated release on ABC Family in 2004. The network continued to air the show daily under its new name Freeform until the fall of 2018, when those rights moved to Pop. In October 2015, Gilmore Girls began running on Up TV, which continues to air it to this day. Josef Adalian of Vulture commented on the rarity of Freeform and Up TV carrying a series of its type in syndication: "not that many non-procedural, hour-long shows from the early part of the century—particularly those from a small network such as WB—are still even airing regularly on one cable network, let alone two." Up TV showed Gilmore Girls 1,100 times in its first year; Freeform aired it 400 times in the same period.

From 2009 to 2013, Gilmore Girls also aired in weekend timeslots on SOAPnet. The series began running on Logo TV in August 2020. Since 2016, UP TV has aired a weeklong marathon of all episodes of Gilmore Girls around the Thanksgiving holiday. As the network maintains a family-friendly focus and programming schedule, some minor dialogue edits are made in a number of episodes, mainly when "hell" and "damn" are said, though all episodes are carried. Start TV began airing Gilmore Girls on May 13, 2025, as part of Warner Bros.' commemoration of the 25th anniversary of the series. Hallmark Channel began airing Gilmore Girls on August 25, 2025.

In the UK, the series premiered on Nickelodeon in 2003. Only the first three seasons were shown, with episodes edited for content, and some, like "The Big One", dropped entirely. The series was subsequently picked up by the Hallmark Channel, which gave UK premieres to seasons four and five. It was rerun in its entirety on E4 until January 2012. The show moved to 5Star, then in 2018 changed to daily screenings on the Paramount Network.

In Ireland, the series aired its entire run on RTÉ One on Sundays, before moving to TG4. In Australia, on the Nine Network it premiered on December 12, 2001, at 7.30pm and from March 16, 2015, Gilmore Girls began airing again at 5.30pm weeknights on digital terrestrial network GEM. In 2025, it streamed on 7plus and Disney+.

=== Home media and online ===
Warner Home Video released all seven seasons of Gilmore Girls on DVD, in regions 1, 2 and 4, mainly in full-screen 4:3 ratio due to Amy Sherman-Palladino's preference at the time of original release. The full series DVD boxset was released in 2007. Special features include deleted scenes, three behind-the-scenes featurettes, cast interviews, montages, and one episode commentary (for "You Jump, I Jump, Jack").

On October 1, 2014, all seven seasons of the series began streaming on Netflix's "Watch Instantly" service in the United States; all episodes, including the three seasons before The WB transitioned the series to 16:9 HD broadcast from season four on, are in that format. On July 1, 2016, Gilmore Girls became available on Netflix worldwide. In an unprecedented move, Gilmore Girls became available to stream on Disney+ in countries such as Australia, New Zealand, United Kingdom, Canada and other regions via the Star hub from the start of early 2025. All seasons of Gilmore Girls are also streaming on Hulu, Disney+ and available for digital download on the iTunes Store, Amazon.com and other digital sales websites, with all digital sites offering all episodes in HD.

Warner Home Video released the complete series of Gilmore Girls on Blu-ray on May 5, 2026.

=== Merchandising ===
The merchandising and Tie-ins that came from the show have ranged through several official merchandise and fan driven merch. With the recent rise of popularity of the show due to it being added to streaming platforms, there has been an increasing amount of merchandise that is linked to the show, such as mugs, clothing, and themed coffee with ties to Luke's Diner. In recent years some of the cast reunited for a Walmart advert, where they also carried certain items of merchandise. Through this advert the actors who played Lorelai Gilmore, Luke Danes and Kirk Gleason, respectively, reunited for a new Walmart holiday advert.

== Reception ==
=== Critical response ===
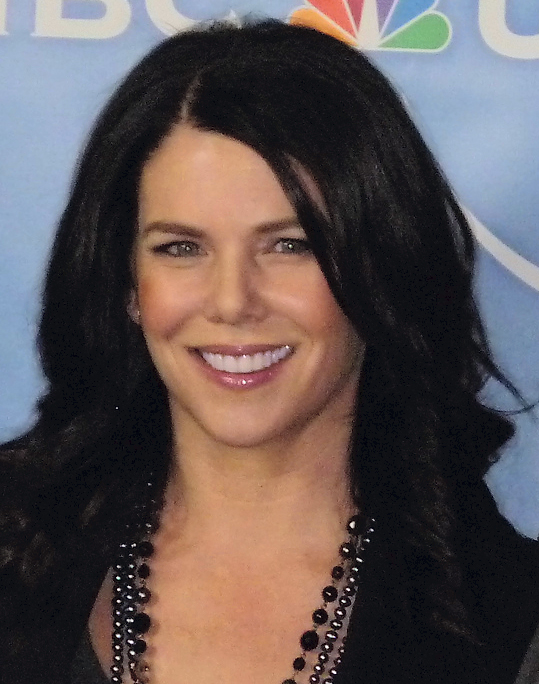
Lauren Graham, who played Lorelai Gilmore, received critical acclaim for her performance.

Gilmore Girls premiered to critical acclaim. Upon debut, Gilmore Girls was lauded for the distinct, dialogue-infused style created by Amy Sherman-Palladino, the strength of the dynamic familial themes, and the performances of its cast, particularly leading star Lauren Graham. On Metacritic, the first season has an average rating of 81 out of 100 from 26 reviews, indicating "universal praise".

In the San Francisco Chronicle, John Carman wrote "It's cross-generational, warm-the-cockles viewing, and it's a terrific show. Can this really be the WB, niche broadcaster to horny mall rats?" Caryn James of The New York Times called it a "witty, charming show" that "is redefining family in a realistic, entertaining way for today's audience, all the while avoiding the sappiness that makes sophisticated viewers run from anything labeled a 'family show.'" Ray Richmond of The Hollywood Reporter declared it "a genuine gem in the making, a family-friendly hour unburdened by trite cliche or precocious pablum," while Jonathan Storm of The Philadelphia Inquirer dubbed it "a touching, funny, lively show that really does appeal to all ages". David Zurawik of The Baltimore Sun called Gilmore Girls "One of the most pleasant surprises of the new season".

For the second-season premiere, Hal Boedeker of the Orlando Sentinel praised the show as "one of television's great, unsung pleasures", and said "Series creator Amy Sherman-Palladino writes clever dialogue and ingratiating comedy, but she also knows how to do bittersweet drama." Emily Yahr of The Washington Post retrospectively called the second installment "Pretty much a perfect season of television". Viewers were concerned that the show would suffer when Rory left for college after season 3, and Yahr commented that the show was not "the same" from this point but gave seasons four and five a positive 7/10.

The last two seasons were less positively received. Maureen Ryan of the Chicago Tribune described the sixth season as "uneven at best", explaining, "the protracted fight between Lorelai and Rory Gilmore left the writers scrambling to cram the show with filler plots that stretched many fans' patience to the limit." The introduction of Luke's daughter has been described as "pretty much the most hated plot device in Gilmore Girls history". Ken Tucker from Entertainment Weekly rated the seventh season "C", describing it as "a death-blow season [which] was more accurately Gilmore Ghosts, as the exhausted actors bumped into the furniture searching for their departed souls and smart punchlines". But he concluded that before this came "six seasons of magnificent mixed emotions" among a "perfect television idyll". Giving the show an overall rating of "A−", he added, "industry ignorance of the writing and of Graham's performance in particular will remain an eternal scandal".

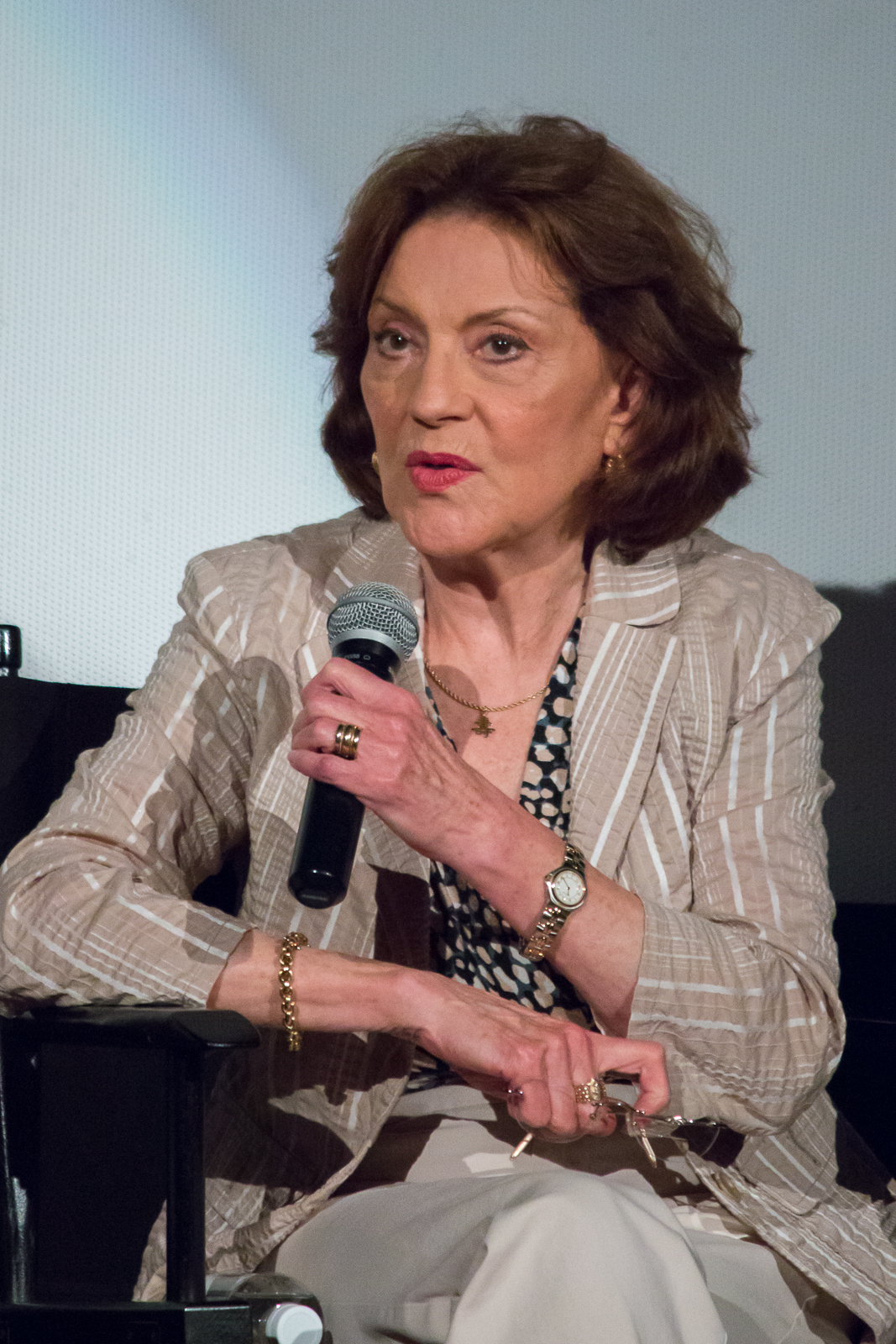
Kelly Bishop portrayed Emily Gilmore.

Gilmore Girls was listed as one of Time magazine's "All-Time 100 TV Shows". and was ranked the 87th greatest American television series in TV (The Book), authored by critics Alan Sepinwall and Matt Zoller Seitz in 2016. Entertainment Weekly placed Gilmore Girls 32nd on its "New TV Classics" list, and included the show on its end-of-the-2000s "best-of" list, and The A.V. Club named "They Shoot Gilmores, Don't They?" as one of the best TV episodes of the decade. Alan Sepinwall included the show in his "Best of the 00s in Comedies" list, saying: "Gilmore offered up an unconventional but enormously appealing family ... As the quippy, pop culture-quoting younger Gilmores were forced to reconnect with their repressed elders, creator Amy Sherman-Palladino got plenty of laughs and tears out of the generational divide, and out of showing the family Lorelai created for herself and her daughter in the idealized, Norman Rockwell-esque town of Stars Hollow. At its best, Gilmore Girls was pure, concentrated happiness."

In 2016, Amy Plitt of Rolling Stone reflected on the enduring appeal of Gilmore Girls, and noted that it stood out from other family shows like 7th Heaven, The O.C. and Everwood by being "far richer, deeper ... The characters were funny and relatable, the banter was zinger-heavy, the familial drama was poignant and the romantic chemistry ... was off the charts."

=== Television ratings ===
Viewer ratings for Gilmore Girls were not relatively large, but the numbers were a success for the smaller WB network and it became one of their flagship series. For its first season the show aired in the tough Thursday 8pm/7pm Central time slot dominated by Friends on NBC and Survivor on CBS. Critical acclaim encouraged the network to move it to Tuesday evenings, as part of a push to promote the series and due to the move of Tuesday stalwart Buffy the Vampire Slayer to UPN in the same timeslot. During season 2, ratings for Gilmore Girls surpassed Buffy and it became The WB's third-highest-rated show, with viewer numbers that grew by double digits in all major demographics. For seasons 4–7, Gilmore Girls was up against the US's top-rated show American Idol, which led to a drop in viewers, but with Season 5 it became The WB's second-most-watched prime time show. The series was often in the top 3 most-viewed shows in its time slot for women under 35.

Viewership and ratings per season of Gilmore Girls
Season	Timeslot (ET)	Network	Episodes	First aired		Last aired		TV season	Viewership rank	Avg. viewers (millions)
Season	Timeslot (ET)	Network	Episodes	Date	Viewers (millions)	Date	Viewers (millions)	TV season	Viewership rank	Avg. viewers (millions)
1	Thursday 8:00 pm	The WB	21	October 5, 2000	5.03	May 10, 2001	4.31	2000–01	126	3.6
2	Tuesday 8:00 pm	The WB	22	October 9, 2001	6.55	May 21, 2002	6.21	2001–02	121	5.2
3	Tuesday 8:00 pm	The WB	22	September 24, 2002	6.20	May 20, 2003	5.49	2002–03	121	4.97
4	Tuesday 8:00 pm	The WB	22	September 23, 2003	4.53	May 18, 2004	5.46	2003–04	157	4.13
5	Tuesday 8:00 pm	The WB	22	September 21, 2004	5.80	May 17, 2005	5.89	2004–05	110	4.8
6	Tuesday 8:00 pm	The WB	22	September 13, 2005	6.22	May 9, 2006	5.33	2005–06	153	4.58
7	Tuesday 8:00 pm	The CW	22	September 26, 2006	4.48	May 15, 2007	4.86	2006–07	206	3.73

In its 2016 syndicated release, Gilmore Girls averaged 100,000–120,000 viewers per episode, for an annual viewership of 11 million on each of its networks. The same year, the chief content officer for Netflix, Ted Sarandos, cited Gilmore Girls as one of the streaming channel's most watched shows worldwide. According to data from Nielsen, Gilmore Girls was one of the top ten most watched television programs on all platforms in 2021, 2022, and 2023.

=== Awards and nominations ===
Gilmore Girls earned several accolades, but did not receive much attention from the major awarding bodies. Its only Emmy nomination was for Outstanding Makeup for a Series, for the episode "The Festival of Living Art", which it won at the 56th Primetime Emmy Awards in 2004. Michael Ausiello has attributed this to "a notorious bias against the WB". Recognition did come from the American Film Institute, who named Gilmore Girls one of the ten best shows at the American Film Institute Awards of 2002, and the Television Critics Association (TCA) who named it Outstanding New Program of the Year at the 17th TCA Awards in 2001. The TCA Awards also nominated the show for Outstanding Drama in 2001 and at the 18th TCA Awards in 2002, and Outstanding Comedy at the 21st TCA Awards in 2005. The Satellite Awards nominated it for Best Series – Musical or Comedy at the 7th Golden Satellite Awards in 2002 and the 9th Golden Satellite Awards in 2004, while it was nominated for Favorite Television Drama at the 31st People's Choice Awards in 2005. The show was honored by the Viewers for Quality Television with a "seal of quality" in 2000. The series also achieved considerable attention from the Teen Choice Awards, where it received multiple nominations and wins including the award for Choice Comedy Series at the 2005 Teen Choice Awards.

Lauren Graham was nominated for a Golden Globe Award for Best Actress – Television Series Drama at the 59th Golden Globe Awards and twice for the Screen Actors Guild Award for Outstanding Performance by a Female Actor in a Drama Series for her work on the first and second seasons, and received five successive nominations for the Satellite Award for Best Actress – Television Series Musical or Comedy. The TCAs nominated her for Individual Achievement in Drama in 2002, then for Comedy at the 22nd TCA Awards in 2006. She also received a Family Television Award, and she won the Teen Choice Award for Parental Unit three times. Alexis Bledel won a Young Artist Award for Best Performance in a TV Drama Series: Leading Young Actress at the 22nd Young Artist Awards, two Teen Choice Awards for Choice TV Actress Comedy, and a Family Television Award. She was also nominated by the Satellite Awards in 2002. Kelly Bishop was twice nominated for the Satellite Award for Best Supporting Actress – Television Series in 2002 and 2004.

=== Fandom and cultural impact ===
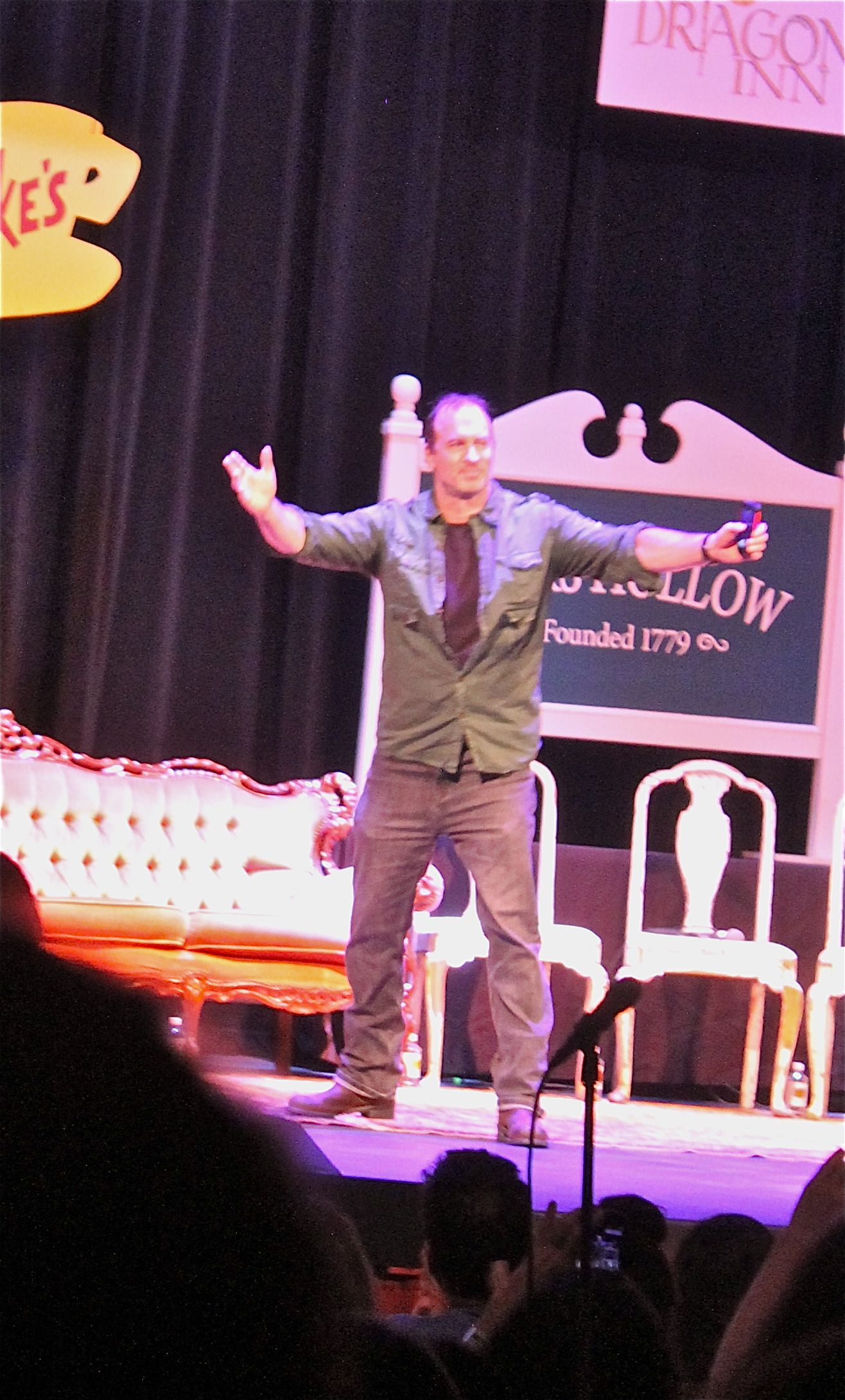
Scott Patterson, who played Luke Danes, at the Gilmore Girls 15th anniversary reunion

Gilmore Girls is considered a cult classic, with an "avid following". During the run of the show this was mostly a small but dedicated group, predominantly of females, but its audience has grown steadily since it came off the air. The series experienced a resurgence when it became available on Netflix in October 2014, introducing it to a new generation of viewers. When the revival was announced in 2015, star Lauren Graham credited it to the campaigning and persistence of the fans. At this point, according to The Washington Post, the show became "a quirky pop culture obsession". The enduring popularity of Gilmore Girls is considered to come from its comforting quality and cross-generational appeal. It is particularly known as a show that mothers and daughters watch together.

The Gilmore Girls Fan Fest has become an annual event since its inauguration in 2016. The unofficial festival takes place in Connecticut over an October weekend, and includes panels with cast and crew, themed activities, and screenings. For the 16th anniversary of the show, 200 coffee houses around the US and Canada were transformed into "Luke's Diners". For two weeks in winter 2018–19, Warner Bros. added a special feature to their studio tour that recreated the Stars Hollow set and displayed props and costumes from the series. The show has an active fandom, posting in internet forums and creating work such as fan fiction. Special Gilmore Girls trivia nights have been held at venues in multiple different cities. Actor from the show, Scott Patterson, who played Luke started his coffee brand which features blends themed after the show. His brand, Scotty P's Big Mug Coffee, sells blends themed after places in the show, such as Luke's blend, named after Patterson's character's diner.

The Irish Independent commented, "Even though it preceded social media, Gilmore Girls has been internet gold for the past few years. Thanks to its snappy one-liners, it's spawned thousands of memes that have introduced the BuzzFeed generation to its coffee-swilling, cheeseburger-loving, critically thinking characters." The show has been parodied on Mad TV and Family Guy, and featured in an episode of Six Feet Under. A cocktail bar in Brooklyn devised a menu inspired by the show. Warner Bros. has produced a range of Gilmore Girls merchandise, including T-shirts, mugs, and dolls.

Three collections of academic essays that analyze the show have been published: Gilmore Girls and the Politics of Identity (2008); Screwball Television: Critical Perspectives on Gilmore Girls (2010); and Gilmore Girls: A Cultural History (2019). In 2002, four young adult novels were published that adapted scripts from the first and second seasons into novel form, told from Rory's first-person point of view. There have also been several unofficial, fan-based guides to the series, including Coffee At Luke's: An Unauthorized Gilmore Girls Gab Fest (2007), The Gilmore Girls Companion (2010), You've Been Gilmored!: The Unofficial Encyclopedia and Complete Guide to Gilmore Girls (2020), and But I'm a Gilmore!: Stories and Experiences of Honorary Gilmore Girls: Cast, Crew, and Fans. The program is also the source of a book club, in which followers aim to read all 339 books referenced on the show, and the inspiration for a cookbook called Eat Like a Gilmore.

Gilmore Girls is the basis for the successful podcast Gilmore Guys (2014–2017), which was named by Time as one of the 50 best podcasts of 2017 – the only television-based inclusion. It follows the hosts, Kevin T. Porter and Demi Adejuyigbe, as they watch every episode of the series. Sadaf Ahsan of the National Post commented that it "helped reignite – and, for some, initiate – fan fervour" towards Gilmore Girls.

The show gained new, younger audiences after becoming available via streaming platforms like Netflix in 2014. Annual streaming has become part of the new fandom, leading to seasonal increases in views of the show and related content on social media. Several years of streaming data have shown a significant boost in viewership every autumn since 2021, when Nielsen began issuing weekly top 10 lists of original and acquired streaming shows in the United States.
