= Keiko Agena =

American actress (born 1973)

- Born: Christine Keiko Agena; October 3, 1973 (age 53); Honolulu, Hawaii, U.S.
- Occupation: Actress
- Years active: 1992–present
- Spouse: Shinichiro "Shin" Kawasaki (m. 2005)
- Website: mskeikoagena.com

Christine Keiko Agena (born October 3, 1973) is an American actress. She is mostly known for playing Lane Kim in Gilmore Girls and NYPD medical examiner Dr. Edrisa Tanaka on FOX's crime drama Prodigal Son (2019–2021).

== Personal life ==
Agena was born in Honolulu and is of Okinawan descent. She married Shin Kawasaki on December 19, 2005.

== Career ==
Agena is best known for her role in Gilmore Girls, where she played Lane Kim, a Korean-American teenager who is the best friend of Rory Gilmore, one of the lead characters. Agena played this role despite being significantly older than her character, who was 16 at the start of the series, when Agena was 27. Agena has also played the role of Mearing's Aide, Mearing being played by Frances McDormand, in Transformers: Dark of the Moon. Agena also appeared in three episodes of Felicity as Leila Foster, a girl who comes to the lead character for assistance in acquiring the morning-after pill and participates in a protest when denied the medication. She was a recipient of the Best Female Actor award in the Ammy Awards, which honor Asian and Asian-American achievement in film or television. She also provided the voice of Yori in the Disney cartoon series Kim Possible in seasons 2, 3, and 4 of the show. Also, Agena played Jun Ni in the movie Hair Show starring Mo'Nique. She guest-starred on Private Practice, Castle, and episode 12 of the final season of ER. She also appeared in Private Valentine: Blonde & Dangerous alongside Jessica Simpson as an army private. In 2010, she appeared onstage in No-No Boy in Santa Monica, California. She later appeared in an episode of House as Dr. Cheng.

While in Austin, Texas for the Gilmore Girls reunion panel at the 2015 ATX Television Festival, she also participated in two live tapings of the podcast Gilmore Guys, as well as a live performance by Lane Kim's band Hep Alien.

In September 2015, Agena launched Drunk Monk Podcast with fellow improv comedian Will S. Choi, wherein they watch every episode of the television series, Monk, while consuming alcohol. Agena plays a high school teacher in the Netflix series 13 Reasons Why.

She was featured in commercials for Verizon Wireless ("Flipside Testimonials: Apartment") in 2015 and UnitedHealthcare ("Pool Vault") in 2016.

== Filmography ==
Film
Year	Title	Role	Notes
1998	Hundred Percent	Casey	
2002	Tomato and Eggs	Maria	Short film
2003	Cats and Mice	Sue	Short film
2003	Red Thread	Matilda Wong	Short film
2003	Western Avenue	Miya	Short film
2004	The Perfect Party	Kiko	
2004	Hair Show	Jun Ni	
2006	Chances Are	Heather	Short film
2008	Private Valentine: Blonde & Dangerous	Hailey Hamamori	
2009	Labor Pains	Pregnant Bookstore Woman	
2010	Road Rage	Connie	Short film
2011	I Hate L.A.	—N/a	Segment: "Downtown"
2011	Transformers: Dark of the Moon	Charlotte Mearing's Aide	
2012	Lil Tokyo Reporter	Mrs. Sato	Short film
2013	Family Gathering	Charlotte	Short film
2014	Me + Her	Lead Puppeteer	Short film
2015	Unfriended	Computer	Voice role Short film
2015	The Night Is Young	Cara	
2020	The Never List	Jennifer Jeffries	

Television
Year	Title	Role	Notes
1993	Renegade	Mitsuko	Episode: "Samurai"
1995	Sister, Sister	Student Interviewer	Episode: "Kid in Play"
1998, 2009	ER	Mrs. Shimahara; Mrs. Vasquez	Episodes: "Good Luck, Ruth Johnson", "Dream Runner"
1999	Beverly Hills, 90210	The Competitor	Episode: "Agony"
2000	Felicity	Leila Foster	Episodes: "Revolutions", "Party Lines", "Running Mates"
2000–2007	Gilmore Girls	Lane Kim	Main cast; 102 episodes
2001	The Nightmare Room	Janet Bingham	Episodes: "School Spirit", "Full Moon Halloween"
2001	Strong Medicine	An-Soo "Alison" Kim	Episode: "Control Group"
2003–2007	Kim Possible	Yori (voice)	4 episodes
2006	Without a Trace	Kimiko	Episode: "Odds or Evens"
2007	Private Practice	Sister Amy	Episode: "In Which Cooper Finds a Port in His Storm"
2010	Castle	Kelly	Episode: "The Mistress Always Spanks Twice"
2010	House	Dr. Cheng	Episode: "Unplanned Parenthood"
2011	The Homes	Nami	Unknown role
2012	Scandal	White House Press Secretary Britta Kagan	Episode: "Happy Birthday, Mr President"
2013–2014	Twisted	April Tanaka	2 episodes
2013	Shameless	Brittany Sturgess	3 episodes
2016	Grimm	Madoka Akagi	Episode: "Inugami"
2016	Gilmore Girls: A Year in the Life	Lane Kim	4 episodes
2017	Colony	Betsy	3 episodes
2017	Sweet/Vicious	Title IX Officer	2 episodes
2017	NCIS: Los Angeles	Tara	Episode: "Getaway"
2017	Bajillion Dollar Propertie$	Tamamara	Episode: "Chelsea Leight-Leigh Lately"
2017–2018	13 Reasons Why	Pam Bradley	7 episodes Recurring role (Season 1); Guest role (Season 2)
2018	This Close	Dorinda	2 episodes
2018	Here and Now	Sonni Little	2 episodes
2018	Dirty John	Nancy	Recurring role (season 1)
2018	The First	Aiko Hakari	Main role
2018–2019, 2022	Better Call Saul	Viola Goto	6 episodes
2019–2021	Prodigal Son	Dr. Edrisa Tanaka	Main cast
2022–2023	Doom Patrol	Dr. Margaret Yu	3 episodes
2023	Fantasy Island	Dr. Nancy	1 episode
2025	The Residence	Liz Hollenbeck	3 episodes
2026	Star Wars: Maul – Shadow Lord	Klyce (voice)	4 episodes

=== Video games ===
List of voice performances in video gaming
Year	Title	Role
2004	Law & Order: Justice Is Served	Toki Yamamoto
2017	Prey	Miyu Sato, Station Announcer

== Awards and nominations ==
Year	Award	Result	Category	Work
2001	Teen Choice Award	Nominated	TV Choice Sidekick	Gilmore Girls
2002	Young Artist Award	Won	Best Performance in a TV Drama Series - Supporting Young Actress	Gilmore Girls
2002	Teen Choice Award	Nominated	TV Choice Sidekick	Gilmore Girls
2003	Teen Choice Award	Nominated	TV Choice Sidekick	Gilmore Girls
2013	Asians on Film Festival	Won	Winter Award for Best Supporting Actress in a Short	Lil Tokyo Reporter
2014	Asians on Film Festival	Nominated	Short Film	Lil Tokyo Reporter
