= Bon Voyage (Gilmore Girls) =

- Gilmore Girls episode
- Episode no.: Season 7 Episode 22
- Directed by: Lee Shallat-Chemel
- Written by: David S. Rosenthal
- Original air date: May 15, 2007
- Running time: 42 minutes

Guest appearances
- Kathleen Wilhoite as Liz Danes; Liz Torres as Miss Patty; Sally Struthers as Babette Dell; Michael Winters as Taylor Doose; Jackson Douglas as Jackson Belleville; Todd Lowe as Zack Van Gerbig; Ted Rooney as Morey Dell; Rose Abdoo as Gypsy; John Cabrera as Brian Fuller; Rini Bell as Lulu; Aris Alvarado as Ceaser; Christiane Amanpour as herself

Episode chronology
← Previous "Unto the Breach"	Next → "Winter"

"Bon Voyage" is the original series finale of the American comedy-drama series Gilmore Girls. The episode serves as the 22nd episode of the seventh season and the show's 153rd episode overall. Written by David S. Rosenthal and directed by Lee Shallat-Chemel, the episode was originally broadcast on The CW in the United States on May 15, 2007.

Gilmore Girls centers on the relationship of Lorelai Gilmore (Lauren Graham) and her daughter Rory (Alexis Bledel). In this episode, Rory gets a job offer, which forces her to cancel her plans to go on vacation with her mother, and the town of Stars Hollow organizes a farewell party for her. "Bon Voyage" received mixed reviews from television critics and fans. Even cast members, including Kelly Bishop, Liza Weil and Edward Herrmann expressed their dissatisfaction with the conclusion. The episode was viewed by 4.9 million viewers, garnering a 2.9/9 Nielsen rating/share in the 18–49 demographic.

"Bon Voyage" remained as a conclusion to Gilmore Girls until October 2015, when Netflix picked up the series for an additional four 90-minute episodes as a limited run.

== Plot ==
The episode starts with Lorelai Gilmore (Lauren Graham) introducing Rory Gilmore (Alexis Bledel) to CNN journalist Christiane Amanpour, who stayed at the Dragonfly Inn. Lorelai then talks about their plans for their one-month trip across the United States and, while Rory finalizes her 74 résumés, she announces the town is preparing a graduation party for her. At Luke's Diner, Luke Danes (Scott Patterson) makes orders regarding the party. At Friday night dinner, Rory arrives late because she had an interview. She announces to Lorelai and her grandparents Emily (Kelly Bishop) and Richard Gilmore (Edward Herrmann) that she has been offered a job as a reporter to cover Barack Obama's presidential campaign and his bid for the Democratic Party nomination for an online magazine, after another reporter dropped out at the last moment, and that she has to leave in three days for an unknown period.

The next day, the girls prepare for Rory's departure and have breakfast at Luke's. They decide, to the town's disappointment, to cancel the party as there is no time for it. However, Luke goes to see Sookie St. James (Melissa McCarthy) at the Inn and suggests they plan a surprise party anyway. Meanwhile, the girls make last-minute errands. They go to Miss Patty (Liz Torres)'s studio to get a back support but the doors are locked. The town is actually holding a secret meeting to discuss the surprise graduation party preparations. Later, Rory visits her best friend Lane Kim (Keiko Agena). She then goes back home where Lorelai is ironing; the latter admits she thinks Rory's departure is too soon.

The next day, the girls drive downtown. There, they see that the whole town has gathered under a tent to say goodbye to Rory. Shortly after, Emily and Richard join the party. Richard says to his daughter Lorelai: "it takes a remarkable person to inspire this". After the party has started, Lorelai says to her parents that they should keep Friday Night Dinner appointments as she has gotten used to it. Sookie tells Lorelai that Luke was the one who organized everything. When Lorelai thanks him, he replies "I just want to see you happy", and they share a kiss. The episode concludes with the girls making a final stop at Luke's early in the morning, mirroring the first scene in the pilot episode.

== Production ==
In April 2006, series' creator Amy Sherman-Palladino and her husband Daniel Palladino did not renew their contract for a seventh season and left the show. David S. Rosenthal who had worked as a writer on the series was hired as showrunner. In November 2006, Rosenthal discussed plans regarding the season 7 finale: "I feel like we're in a place where the season we have planned, the ending of the season could serve as the ending for the show or serve as the new beginning for a new season and its one of those things where I think we're planning to be in a position where it could feel like, "Ooh, this is the start of a new, interesting chapter in the Gilmore Girls lives," or it can also feel like an ending. So, I think strategically we've kind of tried to envision an ending that could serve as an ending or a beginning of a new chapter and a new season."

The original script underwent changes, which Graham commented: "My feeling was [the episode] just felt too light to me - even as a season finale. I thought this should be an opportunity to say goodbye, or at least have some sort of acknowledgement of all these characters. I [also] wanted it to be more dramatic. And David Rosenthal was extremely responsive - more so than he needed to be. So he went back and took another look at it, with more of an eye to, 'How can we acknowledge all of these characters? Give everyone a moment.' I felt it was important to go a little deeper." The last scene of the episode was inspired by the last scene of the pilot episode of the series.

== Reception ==
=== Ratings ===
"Bon Voyage" was first broadcast on May 15, 2007, in the United States on The CW. The episode was watched by 4.9 million viewers and scored a 2.9/9 Nielsen rating/share in the adults among the 18–34 demographic, making it the most watched episode since "Merry Fisticuffs", broadcast on December 12, 2006. In the 18-34 women demographic, it scored a rating of 4/11. The episode ranked second in its time-slot behind American Idol.

=== Critical reception ===
Former Star-Ledger editor Alan Sepinwall was satisfied with the series' conclusion: "In form, if not always in style (because nobody could write Amy Sherman-Palladino dialogue as well as Amy could), this is exactly what a Gilmore Girls series finale should have looked like." The Los Angeles Times positively reviewed the installment: "Maybe, just maybe, this was the only way Gilmore Girls could have ended. And that's a good thing. [...] The show returned to feeling like one helluva coffee fix with friends: a sassy, low-key affair, high on caffeine and free of melodrama. Tuesday's finale was light on its feet and poignant in all the right spots." She called the kiss between Lorelai and Luke "a brief but super-charged moment, it was more than enough to satisfy" and disagreed with the disappointed cast members, saying: "the ending was all about new beginnings. Instead of closure, viewers were given reassuring glimpses into the future. In The A.V. Club list of the 5 must-watch Gilmore Girls episodes, Myles McNutt included the series finale, saying Rosenthal designed "an episode that could function as a series finale if necessary." While admitting dialogues were of less quality during the final season, McNutt applauded Rosenthal for focusing on the mother-daughter relationship "which is the heart of this series, and which offer the strongest moments here."

Giving the episode a 7/10 grade, Joel Keller of AOL TV wrote: "It was all very low-key and laid-back. It was as understated a finale as I've seen in many years -- probably because it was only semi-planned as a finale -- but in this case, I think it was appropriate. Funny, emotionally satisfying, and it leaves the viewer wanting to see what happens next in these people's lives. You really can't ask for more. Considering how hard I've been on the show all season, it's good to see it's going out on a high note." PopMatters's Michael Abernethy gave the episode a 6-star rating out of 10, saying: "The 15 May series finale wisely left the door open for various futures. After seven seasons, The Gilmore Girls ended as the story came full circle, from a daughter’s return to a daughter’s departure." He continued: "While it’s true that the dialogue wasn’t quite so rapid-fire during the final season, the series retained familiar elements. Rory and Lorelai remained devoted to one another, and their relationships with men were still complicated. And many storylines were inherited from Sherman-Palladino. In 2013, Brenden Gallagher of Complex listed the episode among the recent underwhelming TV series finales, calling it a "disappointment like the final season", and summarising, "From the ill-advised, awkwardly executed Christiane Amanpour cameo at the top of the episode, the series finale is a strange, unfulfilling exit from Star's Hollow."

=== Staff response ===
Kelly Bishop was displeased with the finale, calling it "disrespectful" to fans. She explained: "There's so much written into that script, it almost seemed as if -- certainly with my character, certainly with Lorelai and Luke -- that we were ready to move on to the next story line. That we were ready to begin the next season in the very next moment... I see a series of dots after the last scene of the show, rather than a period, or better yet, an exclamation point." Edward Herrmann shared the same feeling: "You don't have the emotionally satisfying moments. After seven years, each of those storylines needs its own episode, almost." Liza Weil who portrayed Paris Geller said: "It's unfortunate that, I think, a lot of those fans are going to think there isn't closure."
