= Gilmore Girls season 4 =

Gilmore Girls
- Season 4
- Season 4 DVD cover
- Showrunner: Amy Sherman-Palladino
- Starring: Lauren Graham; Alexis Bledel; Melissa McCarthy; Scott Patterson; Keiko Agena; Yanic Truesdale; Liza Weil; Sean Gunn; Chris Eigeman; Kelly Bishop; Edward Herrmann
- No. of episodes: 22

Release
- Original network: The WB
- Original release: September 23, 2003 – May 18, 2004

Season chronology
- ← Previous; Season 3 Next → Season 5

The fourth season of Gilmore Girls, an American comedy drama television series, began airing on September 23, 2003, on The WB. After 22 episodes, the season concluded on May 18, 2004. The season aired on Tuesdays at 8:00 pm.

On December 17, 2003, The WB announced that the show was renewed for a fifth season.

== Overview ==
Rory begins attending Yale and discovers Paris has arranged for them to be roommates. At first Rory seems to be adjusting to college life fairly well, but eventually finds the workload to be overwhelming. Paris begins a romance with a much older professor, Asher Flemming, and breaks up with her boyfriend.

Lorelai oversees renovations on the Dragonfly Inn. Although Sookie is pregnant, she and Lorelai start a catering business to make ends meet. As the construction drags on, Lorelai feels the financial crunch. After Sookie gives birth, she is distracted with the baby and Lorelai is resentful for having to shoulder more responsibility concerning the Inn.

Richard is hard at work with his new insurance business, and takes on Jason Stiles as a partner. Lorelai and Jason begin dating, but she insists they keep the relationship a secret from her parents. When Richard's business and wealth are threatened by a lawsuit, he throws Jason under the bus. Lorelai and Emily are angry about Richard's behavior. However, when Jason feels he must sue Richard in retaliation, Lorelai breaks up with him. A rift develops between Richard and Emily that culminates in their separation.

Dean marries his high school girlfriend, Lindsay, despite having lingering feelings for Rory. He gets work on the Inn's construction crew. His marriage hits a rocky patch when Lindsay wants to buy a townhouse and Dean may have to drop out of college to earn enough money.

Luke's historically flaky sister, Liz, seems to have found stability as a jewelry maker on the Renaissance fair circuit. Jess returns to get his car, and asks Rory to run away with him but she refuses. Liz marries T.J., a dimwitted but kind man. Luke and Lorelai go out on a date and he expresses that he is serious about pursuing a relationship with her.

When the Dragonfly Inn has a test-run, Jason shows up and is in denial that he and Lorelai have broken up. Luke and Lorelai confirm they are dating. Rory loses her virginity to Dean, despite him still being married to Lindsay. Lorelai is upset when she finds out and has a fight with Rory.

== Cast ==
=== Main cast ===
- Lauren Graham as Lorelai Gilmore, Rory's mother.
- Alexis Bledel as Rory Gilmore, Lorelai's daughter.
- Melissa McCarthy as Sookie St. James, Lorelai's best friend and co-worker.
- Scott Patterson as Luke Danes, the owner of the local diner.
- Keiko Agena as Lane Kim, Rory's best friend.
- Yanic Truesdale as Michel Gerard, Lorelai and Sookie's co-worker.
- Liza Weil as Paris Geller, Rory's roommate and close friend.
- Sean Gunn as Kirk Gleason, a resident of Stars Hollow who works many jobs.
- Chris Eigeman as Jason Stiles, Richard's business partner and Lorelai's boyfriend.
- Kelly Bishop as Emily Gilmore, Lorelai's mother and Rory's grandmother.
- Edward Herrmann as Richard Gilmore, Lorelai's father and Rory's grandfather.

=== Recurring cast ===
- Jared Padalecki as Dean Forester, Rory's ex-boyfriend.
- Milo Ventimiglia as Jess Mariano, Luke's nephew and Rory's ex-boyfriend.
- Jackson Douglas as Jackson Belleville, Sookie's husband.
- Liz Torres as Miss Patty, the owner of the local dance studio.
- Emily Kuroda as Mrs. Kim, Lane's religious mother.
- Sally Struthers as Babette Dell, Lorelai and Rory's next-door neighbor.
- Ted Rooney as Morey Dell, Lorelai and Rory's next-door neighbor.
- Michael Winters as Taylor Doose, the owner of the local grocery store.
- Todd Lowe as Zach Van Gerbig, Lane's bandmate.
- John Cabrera as Brian Fuller, Lane's bandmate.
- Wayne Wilcox as Marty, Rory's classmate and good friend.
- Sebastian Bach as Gil, Lane's new bandmate.
- Danny Strong as Doyle McMaster, the editor of the Yale Daily News.
- Kathleen Wilhoite as Liz Danes, Luke's younger sister and Jess's mom.
- Michael DeLuise as TJ, Liz's fiancé.
- Rusty Schwimmer as Bruce, Sookie's midwife.

=== Guest ===
- Teal Redmann as Louise Grant, an old classmate of Paris and Rory.
- Shelly Cole as Madeline Lynn, an old classmate of Paris and Rory.
- David Clayton Rogers as Trevor, Rory's classmate.
- Teddy Dunn as Graham, Rory's classmate.
- Michael York as Asher Fleming, Paris's Yale Professor

== Episodes ==
| No. overall | No. in season | Title | Directed by | Written by | Original release date | Prod. code | US viewers (millions) |
|---|---|---|---|---|---|---|---|
| 66 | 1 | "Ballrooms and Biscotti" | Amy Sherman-Palladino | Amy Sherman-Palladino | September 23, 2003 | 176151 | 4.53 |
Lorelai and Rory return from their whirlwind tour of Europe. Taylor and Luke have it out over the new soda shop. A very pregnant Sookie updates Lorelai on the latest baby news. Taylor does not take it well when Rory declines the privilege of being the Stars Hollow Ice Cream Queen. Mother and daughter get caught up in a flurry of activity after Rory realizes that she wrote down the wrong date for freshman orientation, and she only has two days to get ready for Yale, instead of the week she was planning on. Emily is upset when Lorelai misses Friday night dinner and retaliates by turning it into a four-hour extravaganza, complete with ballroom dancing videos before the souffle course. Lorelai is shocked when Luke finally tells her what happened on his cruise with Nicole.
| 67 | 2 | "The Lorelais' First Day at Yale" | Chris Long | Daniel Palladino | September 30, 2003 | 176152 | 4.92 |
While Luke is willing to lend Lorelai his truck to help Rory move into her dorm, he is not too thrilled when the project turns out to take all day to accommodate Lorelai's last minute shopping trips to keep Rory's room on a par with the rest of the dorm, to say nothing of Lorelai's seeming inability to drive a stick, losing his spare tire, and saddling him with the old mattress from Rory's dorm room. Rory's roommates turn out to be a jock, a 15 year old prodigy sorely lacking in socialization skills, and none other than Miss People Person herself, Paris Geller, who arrives with a life coach in tow. Nicole's partners descend on the diner and threaten to ensnare Luke in a morass of paperwork and legal complications when he refuses to hire a lawyer or even discuss accepting a settlement. Responding to Rory's attack of homesickness after just four hours, Lorelai returns to Yale and sets up a dorm-wide takeout food test to judge the quality of the local restaurants, their delivery speed, and the cuteness of their delivery boys. As a thanks for the takeout feast, the next morning some dormmates arrive with breakfast, having "Lorelai'd" a few places on campus to find the best place for coffee and muffins.
| 68 | 3 | "The Hobbit, the Sofa and Digger Stiles" | Matthew Diamond | Amy Sherman-Palladino | October 7, 2003 | 176153 | 5.14 |
To help meet the expenses of opening the inn, Lorelai and Sookie decide to become caterers on the side, with their first assignment being a Lord of the Rings theme party. They run into trouble when Sookie cooks gourmet food that would not appeal to the children. Lorelai springs into action to save the party, but must also comfort Sookie when she fears she will be a bad mother. At Yale, Rory is shocked when she returns from class to find that Emily has redecorated their common room without asking first. Meanwhile, Richard ponders a proposal to take on a new business partner - the son of the former coworker who forced Richard out of his old company.
| 69 | 4 | "Chicken or Beef?" | Chris Long | Jane Espenson | October 14, 2003 | 176154 | 5.40 |
Back home for the weekend, Rory has an uncomfortable encounter with Dean, her ex, and ends up getting invited to his wedding the next day. Although hesitant, she decides to attend. Dean has his bachelor party, gets drunk, and reminisces about Rory to Luke. Meanwhile, Lorelai and Sookie visit Michel at his trendy new workplace to assure him they have no intention of not hiring him to work at the new inn. Lorelai runs into problems getting the permit she needs to begin construction on the inn, and must ask Luke to do a favor for Taylor. Luke, realizing Dean is not over Rory, warns her against attending the wedding. She honors his request and watches Dean get married from afar.
| 70 | 5 | "The Fundamental Things Apply" | Neema Barnette | John Stephens | October 21, 2003 | 176155 | 5.08 |
Rory accepts a classmate's invitation to go out on her first date since breaking up with Jess, while her roommates engage in a war of wills. Meanwhile, Lorelai invites Luke over to share the traditional Gilmore movie night she used to have with Rory, although she is somewhat disturbed after discovering that the designer she just hired to decorate the inn used to work for Emily.
| 71 | 6 | "An Affair to Remember" | Matthew Diamond | Amy Sherman-Palladino | October 28, 2003 | 176156 | 5.16 |
Emily offers Lorelai and Sookie the job of catering the party to launch Richard's new business venture, then runs them ragged with demands. Meanwhile, at school, Rory finds that her roommates' activities are preventing her from studying. She finds the perfect study spot under a tree, but loses it to another student. She eventually pays him off to get her spot back. When Jason proposes moving the launch party to Atlantic City, Emily must cancel her party and fire Lorelai and Sookie. Recognizing her mother's hurt feelings, Lorelai confronts Jason who catches her by surprise when he asks her out on a date.
| 72 | 7 | "The Festival of Living Art" | Chris Long | Daniel Palladino | November 4, 2003 | 176157 | 5.10 |
Sookie and Jackson decide to have a home birth and enlist the services of a formidable midwife named Bruce. Sookie fears she will never give birth when she goes past her due date. When Stars Hollow mounts a festival of living pictures, Kirk goes overboard getting into character for his role as Jesus in "The Last Supper." Lorelai get cast in the painting she wanted, but then develops a bad case of stage fright. Meanwhile, Lane, Zach, and Brian finally find an awesome guitarist to replace Dave, but wonder if he isn't too old to join the band. Nicole asks Luke if they can postpone the divorce and start dating again. Sookie finally goes into labor. Note: This episode won the show's only Emmy Award, for Outstanding Makeup for a Series (non-prosthetic).
| 73 | 8 | "Die, Jerk" | Tom Moore | Daniel Palladino | November 11, 2003 | 176158 | 5.31 |
Richard and Emily hold widely differing points of view on the success of their business trip to Atlantic City. Spurred on by her editor, Rory writes a strongly opinionated dance review that leads to a dining hall confrontation with the ballerina. Even though she continues to resist his interest in her, Lorelai cannot help but be impressed by Jason's smooth moves as he manipulates a frosty Emily into inviting him for Friday night dinner so that he can woo Lorelai. Lane and Dave have a long distance argument over pottery. Michel is back on the staff of the still-under-reconstruction Dragonfly Inn, but his one sneeze has Bruce, the midwife, erecting barriers to his attending a staff meeting which includes an overly-protective new mother Sookie and baby Davey. When she learns that Nicole and Luke have put their divorce on hold and have resumed dating, Lorelai becomes so flustered that she has an argument with Luke. Richard ecstatically roams throughout the house with his laptop after he goes wireless with Jason's help, but Emily fails to be charmed by either the Internet or Mr. Stiles.
| 74 | 9 | "Ted Koppel's Big Night Out" | Jamie Babbit | Amy Sherman-Palladino | November 18, 2003 | 176159 | 5.07 |
Rory and Paris have lunch at Yale with Richard, who introduces them to his friend, Professor Asher Fleming. During Friday night dinner at the Gilmore residence, Lorelai asks for an invitation to the Yale-Harvard game even though Rory clearly gives her an out. Emily is irritated when Lorelai shows up for the game wearing Harvard colors. The Gilmores tailgate in style with flasks, an RV, a BBQ, and servants to wait on their guests. Emily is upset when Pennilyn Lott, Richard's first girlfriend, shows up and asks about the Inn, and Richard is forced to confess that he has continued to have an annual lunch with Pennilyn the entire time that he and Emily have been married. Lorelai takes Jason up on his earlier offer of a dinner date, but they end up leaving the stuffy restaurant and having a great time dining al fresco at a local grocery store. Rory walks back to the dorm after the game and discovers Paris kissing Asher Fleming.
| 75 | 10 | "The Nanny and the Professor" | Peter Lauer | Scott Kaufer | January 20, 2004 | 176160 | 4.97 |
Luke becomes overwhelmed by Lane's work ethic when he hires her to work at the diner. Michel exhibits a profound jealousy of Tobin. Emily and Richard find the treats they brought home from Switzerland are widely panned. Rory is less than thrilled with the new man in Paris' life, especially when she learns that he is teaching her contemporary political fiction class. As Lorelai and Jason grow closer, she begs him to keep their relationship a secret from her parents. Rory's talent for millinery combines with her talent for writing to win her a position on the "Yale Daily News". Inexplicably, Sookie and Jackson allow Michel to babysit for Davey, forcing Lorelai to come to the rescue when Michel needs to get himself and Davey out from under a problem. Richard becomes intensely irritated when the Chez Gilmore walking tour benefiting the Historical Society overstays its welcome.
| 76 | 11 | "In the Clamor and the Clangor" | Michael Grossman | Sheila R. Lawrence & Janet Leahy | January 27, 2004 | 176161 | 4.82 |
Lane sneaks out of the house when Gil gets the band a 2:00 a.m. Tuesday gig at CBGB. After the church bells are repaired, they drive the town crazy, and so Luke and Lorelai team up to break the bells. Rory gets confrontational with William during a political discussion when she suspects that he has been spreading embarrassing stories about her. Lorelai is initially distressed when she learns that Luke has moved to Litchfield to live with Nicole, but a visit to his apartment makes her suspect he hasn't truly moved. Luke asks why Lorelai cares where he lives, but she does not have an answer. Lane and her mother have a long-overdue talk after Mrs. Kim discovers her daughter's secret life as a rock and roll drummer. When Lane offers a compromise to the house rules, Mrs. Kim tells her to move out.
| 77 | 12 | "A Family Matter" | Kenny Ortega | Daniel Palladino | February 3, 2004 | 176162 | 4.64 |
Luke has his hands full as family members return to Stars Hollow: Liz for her high school reunion and Jess for his car. Lane stays in Rory's dorm room at Yale and tries to be a helpful guest. Lorelai agrees to accompany Jason on an office furniture shopping trip on his morning off, but the press of international business calls keeps getting in the way. Jamie's in town, and Paris keeps avoiding him. Lorelai and Jason agree that Emily and Richard need to be told about their relationship, but Lorelai just cannot bring herself to do it after Emily mocks both Jason and the idea that he would ever hit it off with her daughter. Rory's finally speaking her mind on Paris's romantic entanglements backfires when Paris decides she has a future with Asher and breaks up with Jamie. Rory becomes concerned that her mother is having financial problems. When Lorelai and Rory discover Jess sleeping in his car in the freezing cold after an argument with his uncle, Lorelai intercedes on his behalf with Luke, who relents and allows Jess to come inside while Luke spends the night in Litchfield.
| 78 | 13 | "Nag Hammadi Is Where They Found the Gnostic Gospels" | Chris Long | Amy Sherman-Palladino | February 10, 2004 | 176163 | 4.56 |
Jess' attempts to keep a low profile until Gypsy completes the repairs on his car are put to the test as he keeps bumping into Rory all over town. Taylor puts Kirk in charge of the annual Firelight Festival, and his managerial skills, or lack thereof, place a strain on the preparations. Lane follows Rory back to Stars Hollow and a place on the Gilmore couch for the weekend, but isn't quite ready to face her mother. Emily is in a dither about filling a table at a benefit and enlists the help of Lorelai and Jason, whom she encourages to pretend that they are a couple. Luke is less than impressed by Liz's latest business venture and newly-arrived boyfriend, which prompts Jess to give his uncle an earful about minding his own business. After Lorelai and Liz finally meet, Lorelai gets a renewed perspective on Luke. Liz's high school classmates descend upon her brother and reveal long-held crushes on him. Richard is suspicious when Jason's father greets his son at the benefit and does not inquire about the business. Lorelai fixes Luke's broken heart after his confrontation with Jess while Luke fixes Lorelai's broken window. Liz and T.J. end their visit to Stars Hollow, but not before T.J. has a few choice words for Luke. Jess makes a startling confession to Rory before he leaves town.
| 79 | 14 | "The Incredible Sinking Lorelais" | Stephen Clancy | Amy Sherman-Palladino & Daniel Palladino | February 17, 2004 | 176164 | 5.28 |
When Trix returns to town and berates Lorelai and Richard for being financial failures, Richard angrily sets his mother straight, to Emily's delight. Lorelai and Sookie explore ways to ease their financial crunch and raise money to pay their construction crew, one of whom is now Dean. Janet and Paris go head-to-head over the constant presence of Janet's boyfriend in the suite. Lorelai and Rory play an increasingly frustrating game of telephone tag. After Paris, Tanna, and Janet complain about close quarters in the suite, Lane moves out of the dorm and in with Lorelai, and gets her job back at Luke's. Lorelai and Sookie have a heated discussion about sharing the responsibilities of opening their inn. Rory is distraught when one of her professors tells her to drop a class because she cannot handle her course load. Lane runs into her mother and receives a frosty reception. At the end of a very long, hard day, Lorelai and Rory still cannot manage to connect, and end up taking solace in the arms of the married men in their lives, Luke for Lorelai, and Dean for Rory.
| 80 | 15 | "Scene in a Mall" | Chris Long | Daniel Palladino | February 24, 2004 | 176165 | 4.75 |
Kirk branches out from dog sitting for Lulu into a new canine-centered career. Paris goes into germ-phobic overdrive when Rory gets a cold. Lane gets an apartment with Zach and Brian and faces a frigid reception from her aunt and mother, and an overly-eager, non-stop-talking cousin when she packs up her things and moves out. When they realize that their relationship is increasingly being conducted over email and the phone, Lorelai and Rory decide to play hooky and go window shopping in the mall, where they run into Emily in the middle of a shopping binge meltdown. Luke lends Lorelai the thirty thousand dollars she needs to finish construction on the Inn. After Emily confesses that the shopping binge and bickering with Richard stems from her anger at being ignored, neglected, and made to feel useless by her husband, Lorelai reassures her of how much she is accomplished and urges her to talk to Richard, but Emily cannot seem to make the connection with her husband she so desperately desires. Rory and Luke get a peek into Dean's life as a married man, and Luke gets an inkling that something is amiss when he catches Dean's wistful looks towards Rory as Dean unsuccessfully tries to paint a happy picture of life with Lindsay and her parents.
| 81 | 16 | "The Reigning Lorelai" | Marita Grabiak | Jane Espenson | March 2, 2004 | 176166 | 4.71 |
The rift between Emily and Richard widens when he goes on a golf date with clients instead of accompanying his wife to the funeral of her best friend. Doyle goes on a theft and plagiarism rant. Trix dies suddenly and stricken with grief and guilt, Richard is inconsolable. Emily calls it quits on arranging Trix's funeral and drops everything in her daughter's lap after finding a letter in which her mother-in-law pleads with her son on the eve of his wedding to Emily to marry Pennilyn instead. Luke and Nicole have all of Stars Hollow listening in and reading lips as they quarrel. Worried about her parents and frantic over fulfilling Trix's exacting requirements for her funeral, Lorelai has a meltdown while shopping for Trix's funereal undies. After the service, cousin Marilyn regales family and friends with tales of Lorelai the First. Emily and Richard finally reach out to each other as he defies one of his mother's last wishes for the sake of his wife.
| 82 | 17 | "Girls in Bikinis, Boys Doin' the Twist" | Jamie Babbit | Amy Sherman-Palladino | April 13, 2004 | 176167 | 4.95 |
Lorelai and Rory get the dubious honor of the first ride in Kirk's latest venture, the Stars Hollow pedicab. Rory, Paris, Janet and Glenn escape a cold, rainy winter and head to Florida for spring break, where they run into Madeline and Louise, who show them the ropes. The introverted Rory and Paris struggle to join the partying. The Shins play at a club the girls attend. After a wild night, the girls conclude they have had enough of the spring break experience and plan to fly back to Connecticut. Jason gives Lorelai the key to his apartment as a symbol of his commitment to their relationship. Lorelai bails Luke out of jail after he is arrested for beating up the car belonging to the man he suspects is having an affair with Nicole; Lorelai stops Luke from beating up the car again when the man is still in Nicole's townhouse.
| 83 | 18 | "Tick, Tick, Tick, Boom!" | Daniel Palladino | Daniel Palladino | April 20, 2004 | 176168 | 3.95 |
Luke makes a bigger fuss than Davey when Sookie and Jackson bring their son into the diner. All of Stars Hollow is amused when Taylor returns from his Caribbean cruise with a drastic change in his appearance. Richard and Emily are stunned when Floyd informs them that Lorelai and Jason have been dating for months. Luke comes to the rescue when Kirk's failure to make a map of the Easter eggs he hid in the town square angers Taylor. Richard and Jason discover that Floyd's peacemaking overtures are a disguise for his plan to ruin Richard financially by suing them for stealing his clients. While shopping with Lane in Doose's, Rory has harsh words about Lindsay as she relates her quarrel with Dean over his plans to drop out of college to earn more money to buy a house, unaware that his wife is listening in the next aisle. Richard resolves his legal problems with Floyd by ruining Jason's career. Dean and Rory agree to continue their friendship, despite Lindsay's demand that they stop speaking to each other.
| 84 | 19 | "Afterboom" | Michael Zinberg | Sheila R. Lawrence | April 27, 2004 | 176169 | 4.52 |
Luke finalizes his divorce with Nicole. Lane's band's latest gig is a big hit, but leaves her feeling lonely. As the Dragonfly Inn nears its opening date, Michel gives travel agents the grand tour and Sookie is back in the kitchen, if not on her feet. Doyle clues Rory in on Asher's reputation as a serial student dater. Lorelai and Richard argue over his treatment of Jason. Lane is upset to discover that her mother has taken in a Korean exchange student who may be the daughter Mrs. Kim always wanted. Jason, now unable to work due to Richard's betrayal, decides to sue him, and so Lorelai breaks up with Jason. Afraid that Richard's actions will put a rift in their relationship with Lorelai and Rory, Emily asks her husband to reconsider, but he brushes her off. Asher is displeased when Rory questions whether the "A" he gave her for a paper has any connection to her friendship with Paris. After Richard and Emily act very strangely during Friday night dinner, Lorelai discovers that her mother has moved out of the house and into a hotel. Lane begins to realize how much she misses her mother.
| 85 | 20 | "Luke Can See Her Face" | Matthew Diamond | Amy Sherman-Palladino & Daniel Palladino | May 4, 2004 | 176170 | 4.68 |
Jackson's devotion to his wife and her famous zucchini soup set the stage for the perfect antidote to the stress surrounding the opening of the Inn. Luke unwittingly comes to the rescue when Sookie tries to set Lorelai up with the poultry supplier. Liz returns to Stars Hollow to announce that she is getting married in the town square in a week. Paris and Asher decide to travel to England together during the summer. T.J. has a tumultuous bachelor party. At Luke's request, Jess changes his mind about attending his mother's wedding and returns to Stars Hollow for the festivities. Rory tries to hide her discomfort when Lorelai tells her about overhearing a fight between Dean and Lindsay. A self-help tape helps Luke clarify his thinking, and a talk with Jess gets him started on the path to having the relationship he has been looking for all along.
| 86 | 21 | "Last Week Fights, This Week Tights" | Chris Long | Daniel Palladino | May 11, 2004 | 176171 | 4.61 |
As Stars Hollow prepares for the Renaissance-themed wedding of Liz and T.J., Kirk feels slighted when Miss Patty chooses someone else as the maypole dance captain. Lorelai discovers an equine visitor in the Dragonfly Inn's lobby. Rory's suite mates depart for summer vacation. Lorelai urges Mrs. Kim to call Lane. Lorelai unsuccessfully attempts to get Emily to admit to the separation during Friday night dinner. T.J. revels in the wonders of tights, but discovers their main drawback during the ceremony. Mrs. Kim is horrified that Lane is living with Zach and Brian (boys) in a shabby apartment. She is advised by Lorelai to pretend the boys are just girls, and eventually returns for tea. Rory calls Dean to rescue her from the disastrous date Emily has arranged for her with the son of a friend. Luke and Lorelai share significant glances during a slow dance at the wedding, which prompts Luke to ask Lorelai out on a date. Jess expresses his gratitude to Luke before saying goodbye. Rory tells Jess it is over between them when he asks her to leave Stars Hollow with him.
| 87 | 22 | "Raincoats and Recipes" | Amy Sherman-Palladino | Amy Sherman-Palladino | May 18, 2004 | 176172 | 5.46 |
Momentous changes are in the air as the Dragonfly Inn approaches opening day by having a shakedown weekend. Emily and Richard admit that they have separated. Kirk enlists Luke to help protect Lulu from the deep, dark secret of his night terrors when the couple spends the night at the Inn. Jason appears at the Inn to plead his case with Lorelai, to no avail. Luke is upset to Lorelai because he thought his intentions were clear and openly says that he wants to pursue a relationship with her, to which she responds she is not with Jason anymore and wants to explore things romantically with him too: the two share their first kiss. Rory loses her virginity to Dean, despite him still being married to Lindsay. Lorelai is upset when she learns Rory is "the other woman" and Rory is mad that Lorelai cannot be happy for her. In 2009, TV Guide ranked this episode #75 on its list of the 100 Greatest Episodes.

== DVD release ==
The Complete Fourth Season
| Set details | | Special features | | |
| 22 episodes; 6-disc set; 1.33:1 aspect ratio; 1.78:1 aspect ratio (international); Subtitles: English, Spanish and French; English (Dolby Digital 2.0 Surround) | | Additional scenes; "Ballrooms and Biscotti"; "The Reigning Lorelai"; Who Wants to Get Together: A Montage of Season Four's Most Romantic Moments; Gilmore Goodies & Gossip: On-Screen Factoids — "Girls in Bikinis, Boys Doin' the Twist"; Stars Hollow Challenge Trivia Game; "Guide to Gilmorisms" booklet | | |
Release dates
| North America | United Kingdom | Continental Europe | Norway | Australia |
| September 27, 2005 | July 27, 2009 | June 14, 2006 | November 15, 2006 | July 5, 2006 |
