= Gilmore Girls season 5 =

Gilmore Girls
- Season 5
- Season 5 DVD cover
- Showrunner: Amy Sherman-Palladino
- Starring: Lauren Graham; Alexis Bledel; Melissa McCarthy; Scott Patterson; Keiko Agena; Yanic Truesdale; Liza Weil; Sean Gunn; Kelly Bishop; Edward Herrmann
- No. of episodes: 22

Release
- Original network: The WB
- Original release: September 21, 2004 – May 17, 2005

Season chronology
- ← Previous; Season 4 Next → Season 6

The fifth season of Gilmore Girls, an American comedy drama television series, began airing on September 21, 2004, on The WB. The season concluded on May 17, 2005, after 22 episodes. The season aired Tuesdays at 8:00 pm.

On May 17, 2005, The WB announced that the show was renewed for a sixth season.

== Overview ==
The season picks up at the exact point the previous season ended, with Lorelai embarking on a relationship with Luke and Rory beginning an affair with married Dean. Having finally admitted they are separated, Richard and Emily formalize things by having Richard move into the pool house, with the girls splitting Friday nights between the two of them. Dean's marriage to Lindsay comes to an abrupt end when she finds a letter Rory wrote to Dean about their night together. He and Rory try dating again but have difficulty spending time together and quickly split for good.

Christopher reveals that Sherry has left him to look after Georgia alone and asks Lorelai for help. Rory asks him to keep his distance but relents when his father dies suddenly. Both Richard and Emily are uncomfortable with Lorelai and Luke's relationship, with Richard trying to get Luke to franchise his diner. They reconcile and renew their vows with Rory as best man and Lorelai as maid of honor. Emily invites Christopher and encourages him to pursue Lorelai, resulting in Luke and Lorelai splitting for a time and both Lorelai and Rory falling out with Emily, although Rory continues to attend Friday night dinners alone as part of their deal.

Lane is shocked to realize she has feelings for Zach and they start dating, but she surprises them both by revealing she wants to wait for marriage before having sex. Paris returns from Oxford and reveals Asher has died of a heart attack, but is soon dating Doyle. Sookie becomes pregnant again and has a daughter, before ordering Jackson to have a vasectomy. Jackson stands against Taylor as town selectman and is elected but is soon overwhelmed with work. Michel wins a camper van on The Price Is Right but soon sells it. Kirk decides to move out of his mother's place to spend more time with Lulu but forgets to find somewhere to move to so ends up finding various places to stay. When Old Man Twickham dies, his house is initially set up as a town museum before being sold. Kirk and Luke compete to buy it but the town elders decide Luke wants it more after he describes it as his dream house.

Despite romantic overtures from Marty, Rory is drawn to Logan Huntzberger, a rich playboy who introduces her to a hedonistic thrill-seeking lifestyle. They initially have a casual relationship but when Rory decides it is not for her, he agrees to a committed relationship. He takes her home where his mother and grandfather make it clear they do not think she is good enough to marry him. His father Mitchum gives her an internship at one of his papers but tells her he does not think she has what it takes to be a journalist. Upset, she convinces Logan to steal a yacht to take her out on the sea.

In the season finale, Rory has been charged for the yacht theft and announces she is dropping out of Yale. Lorelai refuses to let her come home so Richard and Emily let her move into the pool house and get a job, hoping she will change her mind. Luke tells Taylor he is pulling out of the house purchase when he discovers Lorelai is considering selling the inn, while Lane's mother arranges for her and the band to tour church theaters. The season ends with Lorelai asking Luke to marry her.

== Cast ==
=== Main cast ===
- Lauren Graham as Lorelai Gilmore, Rory's mother.
- Alexis Bledel as Rory Gilmore, Lorelai's daughter.
- Melissa McCarthy as Sookie St. James, Lorelai's best friend and co-worker.
- Scott Patterson as Luke Danes, the owner of the local diner and Lorelai's boyfriend.
- Keiko Agena as Lane Kim, Rory's best friend.
- Yanic Truesdale as Michel Gerard, Lorelai and Sookie's co-worker.
- Liza Weil as Paris Geller, Rory's roommate and close friend.
- Sean Gunn as Kirk Gleason, a resident of Stars Hollow who works multiple jobs.
- Kelly Bishop as Emily Gilmore, Lorelai's mother and Rory's grandmother.
- Edward Herrmann as Richard Gilmore, Lorelai's father and Rory's grandfather.

=== Recurring cast ===
- Jackson Douglas as Jackson Belleville, Sookie's husband.
- Matt Czuchry as Logan Huntzberger, Rory's boyfriend.
- Liz Torres as Miss Patty, the owner of the local dance studio.
- Emily Kuroda as Mrs. Kim, Lane's religious mother.
- Sally Struthers as Babette Dell, Lorelai and Rory's next door neighbor.
- Ted Rooney as Morey Dell, Lorelai and Rory's next door neighbor.
- Michael Winters as Taylor Doose, the owner of the local grocery store.
- Jared Padalecki as Dean Forester, Rory's ex-boyfriend.
- David Sutcliffe as Christopher Hayden, Rory's father and Lorelai's ex-boyfriend.
- Todd Lowe as Zach Van Gerbig, Lane's bandmate and boyfriend.
- John Cabrera as Brian Fuller, Lane's bandmate.
- Sebastian Bach as Gil, Lane's bandmate.
- Danny Strong as Doyle McMaster, the editor of the Yale Daily News and Paris's boyfriend.
- Wayne Wilcox as Marty, Rory's classmate and good friend.
- Kathleen Wilhoite as Liz Danes, Luke's younger sister.
- Michael DeLuise as TJ, Liz's husband.
- Gregg Henry as Mitchum Huntzberger, Logan's father.
- Scout Taylor Compton as Clara Forester, Dean's sister.
- Devon Sorvari as Honor Huntzberger, Logan's sister.
- Arielle Kebbel as Lindsay Lister Forester, Dean's ex-wife.

== Episodes ==
No. overall	No. in season	Title	Directed by	Written by	Original release date	Prod. code	US viewers (millions)
88	1	"Say Goodbye to Daisy Miller"	Amy Sherman-Palladino	Amy Sherman-Palladino	September 21, 2004	2T5301	5.80
Things are still testy between Lorelai and Rory, and Rory's refusal to discuss the Dean situation causes Lorelai anguish. Emily announces that she and Richard have separated. Sookie is ecstatic when Kirk tells her that Luke and Lorelai kissed. Rory's attempt to meet Dean and discuss what happened leads to a lot of action, but no talk. Dean provokes an argument with Lindsay after leaving Rory's house. Emily decides to go to Europe and invites Rory to accompany her. Lorelai and Luke are very tentative with each other the day after until they are able to reassure each other that they are on the right path. Luke heads off to Maine for a week to help Liz and T.J. with their Ren Faire booth. Rory decides that she needs a break from both Dean and her mother, and decides to take her grandmother up on her invitation to go to Europe.
89	2	"A Messenger, Nothing More"	Daniel Palladino	Daniel Palladino	September 28, 2004	2T5302	5.99
T.J. is milking his injuries for all he is worth, but Luke decides that it is time to go home after seven weeks on the Ren Faire circuit. Rory calls to apologize and to ask her mother to deliver a letter to Dean. Sookie accurately diagnoses Lorelai with a bad case of management burnout, and the two friends decide to decompress with a girls-day-out. Emily and Rory come home exhausted from fending off the attentions of randy European men. Michel is wildly unenthusiastic when he is pressed into babysitting for guests whose children take an inexplicable shine to him. After Lindsay finds Rory's letter, she throws Dean and all his possessions out of the house, and her mother has an angry confrontation with Lorelai in the town square. Lane realizes that she is falling hard for Zack. Rory is saddened when Dean expresses regret for the shift in their relationship and the harm it caused to his wife and their families.
90	3	"Written in the Stars"	Kenny Ortega	Amy Sherman-Palladino	October 5, 2004	2T5303	6.10
Luke and Lorelai go on their official first date at a restaurant owned by old friends of Luke's parents. Luke reminds Lorelai of how they met, shows her a horoscope she gave him for good luck that he has kept in his wallet, and assures her that he intends to go the distance with her. Lorelai spends the night at Luke's place. In the morning, she goes down to the diner to get coffee, and the breakfast crowd sees her wearing only Luke's shirt. There is surprisingly little gossip about Luke and Lorelai until the next town meeting, where Taylor uses charts to show how disastrous a breakup between them would be for Stars Hollow. Meanwhile, Rory meets a rich Yale student named Logan and chews him out for being rude to her friend Marty. Paris holds a wake for Asher that all the guests assume is a keg party with a weird theme. Emily freaks out when she discovers that Richard has a social life she does not know about so she invades Rory's dorm during the wake.
91	4	"Tippecanoe and Taylor, Too"	Lee Shallat-Chemel	Bill Prady	October 12, 2004	2T5304	5.81
Lorelai confesses that part of the charm of breakfast by Luke is breakfast at Luke's. Rory is less than thrilled to discover that the common room in her suite has been overtaken by a huge antique printing press Paris inherited from Asher. Lorelai and Sookie head up Jackson's campaign committee when he decides to run against Taylor for town selectman to end the grocer's petty tyranny over Stars Hollow, but Lorelai has second thoughts when she sees how Jackson's projected landslide victory is affecting Taylor. Rory and Dean have difficulty finding a comfortable place to be alone, compounded by Dean's having to share a car with Lindsay and his reluctance to make his relationship with Rory public. Lane confesses her true feelings to Zack. After all the votes have been counted, Jackson is not quite certain he wants the job, and Taylor vows not to go away quietly.
92	5	"We Got Us a Pippi Virgin"	Stephen Clancy	Daniel Palladino	October 19, 2004	2T5305	5.64
The demands of the electorate are beginning to get to Jackson. Lorelai and Rory delicately nudge Richard and Emily closer together. Lorelai decides that a double date with Rory and Dean is the way to smooth over the bumps in her relationship with Dean, but the evening goes awry when Luke cannot get over feeling that Dean is not good enough for Rory. Richard takes up a new hobby, and Emily buys a panic room. Failing to get a response from Zack about the declaration of her feelings, Lane rescinds them, which finally gets Zack talking. Lorelai introduces Luke to "Pippi Longstocking" as Kirk gets much better acquainted with Lulu during movie night at the Black & White & Read Bookstore.
93	6	"Norman Mailer, I'm Pregnant!"	Matthew Diamond	James Berg & Stan Zimmerman	October 26, 2004	2T5306	5.82
Doyle is jealous when the New York Times picks up Glenn's article. Rory discovers that Logan, the son of a newspaper magnate, is also on the paper's staff. Paris wages a fierce campaign to get the religion beat and takes an ecumenical approach to alienate the local clergy. Desperate for a story idea for her features assignment after several concepts fail to pan out, Rory uncovers a secret Yale society which counts Logan as a member, and enlists his cooperation in getting a story on the group. Sookie becomes upset when the Inn's accountant suggests dropping lunch temporarily to save money and Norman Mailer stakes out a table in the dining room to work and give interviews, and refuses to order anything from the menu except iced tea. Lorelai and Rory show up for Friday night dinner, and when they discover that neither Emily nor Richard are home, decide to order pizza and eat on the living room floor. Christopher calls Lorelai in a panic when Sherry suddenly decides to move to Paris, leaving him unprepared to care for a colicky Gigi. After freaking out completely over Norman Mailer's constant presence Sookie realizes that her extreme emotions and sensitivity in the past days result from her being pregnant again. Rory asks Christopher to stay away from Lorelai.
94	7	"You Jump, I Jump, Jack"	Kenny Ortega	Daniel Palladino	November 2, 2004	2T5307	5.81
After Kirk spills the beans that her daughter is dating Luke, Emily demands that Lorelai bring him to dinner so that they can get reacquainted. Although Lorelai tries to warn him away, Luke goes anyway and is subjected to an evening of oblique insults from a passive-aggressive Emily. After Zach announces that he is ready to start going out with Lane, they spend a cozy first date at home after banishing Brian to Lane's bedroom. Having not learned his lesson with Emily, Luke agrees to accept Richard's invitation to go golfing, and both men turn a deaf ear to Lorelai's pleas to cancel. Rory gets her story on the "Life and Death Brigade" by being blindfolded and whisked away by Logan and his friends to observe the elaborately staged weekend in the woods, and finally, after Logan encourages her to take a risk, to participate in the event's breathtaking finale.
95	8	"The Party's Over"	Eric Laneuville	Amy Sherman-Palladino	November 9, 2004	2T5308	6.13
After Emily discovers that Rory is seeing Dean again, she calls a temporary truce with Richard so that they can jointly host a Yale alumni party whose express purpose is to find a suitable match for their unsuspecting granddaughter. Liz and T.J. buy a house in Stars Hollow. Mrs. Kim flips out after Kyon tells her that Lane and Zach hugged in Luke's Diner. When the pressures of being new homeowners lead Liz and T.J. to quarrel, T.J. seeks refuge with his brother-in-law and ruins the romantic dinner and evening Luke prepared for Lorelai. Logan appears at the party just in time to rescue Rory from yet another prospective bridegroom, and Rory learns that he is very well acquainted with her grandparents. Lane leads Kyon over to the culinary dark side and reveals the secrets to living a happy teenage life at the Kim house. Dean realizes that he no longer fits into Rory's life, and Logan gallantly steps in to dry her tears.
96	9	"Emily Says Hello"	Kenny Ortega	Rebecca Rand Kirshner	November 16, 2004	2T5309	6.01
Jackson is the soul of patience as Sookie suffers from mood swings and pregnancy food cravings. Paris' decision to fast for Ramadan to bring authenticity to her writing takes its toll on Rory and Marty. Against Lorelai's advice, Michel persists with his plan to foil the bathrobe bandits and nearly gets arrested. Emily decides to start dating again and calls on a reluctant Lorelai for advice. Jackson is so overwhelmed by his duties as Selectman that Miss Patty is forced to resort to a ruse to get him to preside over the town meeting. Lorelai invites Christopher to lunch at the Inn and decides to surprise Rory by inviting her as well, but it is Lorelai who is surprised by the tension between father and daughter, which erupts into a heated argument out of Lorelai's earshot. Lorelai feels guilty for lying to Rory when her daughter asks about Luke's reaction to the lunch date with Christopher. Luke helps T.J. with some plumbing problems at the new house. Emily appears to have a wonderful time on her date, but bursts into tears when she looks around her empty home at the end of the date. Luke feigns indifference when Lorelai finally tells him about lunch with Christopher, but hints at some ambivalence during a later conversation with T.J.. Marty's timing is off by mere seconds when he attempts to ask Rory out on a date.
97	10	"But Not as Cute as Pushkin"	Michael Zinberg	Amy Sherman-Palladino	November 30, 2004	2T5310	6.23
Miss Patty celebrates forty years in show business on the same day that Luke mourns his father's death. Terrence's urging Paris to get on with her life prompts her to try speed dating, where she hooks up with Doyle. Marty finally clues Rory in that both he and Logan are interested in her. Lorelai's attempt to do something nice for Luke backfires. Rory enlists Richard in turning the practical joke table back on Logan. At Headmaster Charleston's request, Rory happily gives Anna, a Chilton student and prospective Eli, the Yale grand tour, but the immature Anna manages to get both herself and her host in trouble with her party-crazed ways.
98	11	"Women of Questionable Morals"	Matthew Diamond	Daniel Palladino	January 25, 2005	2T5311	5.05
Wanting to make peace with Rory, Christopher shows up at Yale, but she brushes off his attempt at compromise. When Lorelai learns that Christopher's father just died, she spends the evening at his place trying to comfort him, then refrains from telling Luke the truth about where she was. Emily and Richard briefly reconciled when they find and take in a lost dog.
99	12	"Come Home"	Kenny Ortega	Jessica Queller	February 1, 2005	2T5312	4.68
Rory offers to help Logan write an article for the Yale Daily, but she is disappointed when he does not invite her to be his date at a book signing party thrown by his father. When Richard sees Emily talking to the man she dated, he rear-ends her car forcing her to ride home with him. The Gilmores reconcile and decide to renew their wedding vows. Emily warns Christopher that Lorelai and Luke are getting serious and he had better do something quickly if he hopes to end up with Lorelai.
100	13	"Wedding Bell Blues"	Amy Sherman-Palladino	Amy Sherman-Palladino	February 8, 2005	2T5313	6.33
Emily and Richard renew their vows in front of their family and closest friends. Lorelai acts as Emily's Maid of Honor and Rory as Richard's Best Man. Luke gets in a fight with Christopher over Lorelai. Logan comes to the ceremony with a girl that looks like his girlfriend, and Rory gets jealous. Rory confronts Logan and they steal away to a side room. When they are caught, Rory and Logan are shamed for acting inappropriately. Lorelai realizes that Emily manipulated Christopher into acting out, and she angrily tells Emily that their relationship is over.
101	14	"Say Something"	Daniel Palladino	Daniel Palladino	February 15, 2005	2T5314	5.32
Lorelai does her best to get Luke to not give up on them after the awful events at the renewal ceremony. Luke tells her he needs some time and Lorelai cannot take it. Rory asks Logan to hang out with her, but is upset that when she gets to his place, there are many people there. She gets a call from Sookie who tells her that Lorelai is in bad shape after Luke broke off their relationship. Rory does not have a car, but Logan lets her borrow his car and driver so she can rush home. Taylor has the whole town taking sides for either Luke or Lorelai. After taking care of her mom, Rory goes back to Yale to work things out with Logan, making sure he understands that the hanging out did not just mean hanging out, it meant alone time.
102	15	"Jews and Chinese Food"	Matthew Diamond	Amy Sherman-Palladino	February 22, 2005	2T5315	5.25
Still smarting from her split with Luke, Lorelai is further stung when she notices that Luke has moved his boat. Meanwhile, Luke volunteers to build the sets for a school production of "Fiddler on the Roof", knowing that Lorelai is doing costumes, in hopes that their paths will cross. Luke becomes angry when they do not meet up and confronts Lorelai about it in a fit, momentarily exposing his true feelings that he misses Lorelai. She explains she was not avoiding him, but making the costumes at home. At Yale, Rory plans to reconnect with estranged friend Marty by watching Marx Brothers movies, but Logan interrupts their movie night by inviting them to dinner with his group. At the restaurant, it is clear there is a class difference between Logan's affluent crowd and Marty. Afterwards, Marty admits to Rory that he does not have enough money to pay his bill.
103	16	"So...Good Talk"	Jamie Babbit	Lisa Randolph	March 1, 2005	2T5316	5.51
When Richard and Emily return from their second honeymoon, Rory attends Friday night dinner without Lorelai, who refuses to speak to her mother or see her, and plans a girls' night out with Sookie instead. Richard and Emily give a 100-year-old Greek book to Rory and have yet another maid. Rory surprises everyone with a rare outburst at her grandmother for interfering in Lorelai's love life. Meanwhile, Luke, who is miserable without Lorelai, takes his anger out on his customers. His dark mood causes him to burn the food and when one customer wants his omelet redone, he throws him out of the diner. When a meter maid is writing a ticket to put on Luke's boat (that is parked in front of the diner) Lorelai comes in time to put some quarters in the meter. Emily goes to the diner to tell Luke to reconcile with Lorelai, thinking that Lorelai will come back into their lives if their romance is rekindled. Meanwhile, Lane has a horrific realization about her mother's influence.
104	17	"Pulp Friction"	Michael Zinberg	James Berg & Stan Zimmerman	March 8, 2005	2T5317	5.23
Now that Luke and Lorelai are back together, Lorelai can come into the diner. They make a date to celebrate getting back together. Rory and Logan are still dating, however not exclusively. Rory and Lorelai see him with another girl while they are shopping in downtown New Haven. Rory brushes it off as part of their arrangement, but Lorelai does not like the idea. When Rory goes to Finn's Quentin Tarantino-themed birthday party with Robert, Logan gets jealous. Emily and Richard assume that since Emily gave instructions to Luke to get back together with Lorelai, all must be forgiven now. However, they are surprised to see only Rory show up for Friday dinner.
105	18	"To Live and Let Diorama"	Jackson Douglas	Daniel Palladino	April 19, 2005	2T5318	4.81
Old man Twickum dies, declaring through his will that the house be made into a museum for two months, then disposed of by the Head of the Historical Society, aka Taylor. Much to everyone's surprise, Luke volunteers to help with the museum to remain close to the house, as he wants to buy it for his future with Lorelai. Lorelai is interviewed by a magazine due to her success with the inn, but ends up bad-mouthing her mother to the reporter. Lane suspects Zach of cheating on her with Sophie. Rory, Paris, and Lane get tipsy together on Miss Patty's Punch in Stars Hollow, as the trio sulks over their recent pitfalls with love and then try to contact their beaus. Dean informs Luke that their situations are the same, as Dean believes Rory and Lorelai both want more than small-town-guys, and that Lorelai will eventually get bored with Luke and move on. Lane discovers Zach secretly practicing in a bluegrass band. (Last appearance of Jared Padalecki.)
106	19	"But I'm a Gilmore!"	Michael Zinberg	Amy Sherman-Palladino	April 26, 2005	2T5319	5.52
Rory realizes that she is not a casual dater and tells Logan that she wants to be friends. He surprises her by suggesting they become a couple instead and plan to attend dinner with his family, at which his sister Honor plans to announce her engagement. At the dinner, Logan's family angrily confronts Logan and Rory, informing them that they find Rory to be an unsuitable match, upsetting Rory. She is shaken that her high class pedigree is not good enough for the first time in her life, exclaiming "I'm a Gilmore!" Luke fills in as Head Chef at the Dragonfly while Lorelai looks for a temporary replacement for Sookie, who must remain on bed rest while pregnant. Unfortunately, Sookie does not like losing control of her kitchen and begins using sneaky tactics to interfere with Luke. Paris learns Doyle has not returned her calls lately because he is severely sick. Even though she is premed, Paris dislikes sick people and so brings in Nanny to nurse him back to health.
107	20	"How Many Kropogs to Cape Cod?"	Jamie Babbit	Bill Prady & Rebecca Rand Kirshner	May 3, 2005	2T5320	5.10
Rory starts her journalism internship, which she received as a peace offering after the bad dinner with Logan's family. Due to low attendance and much to Luke's delight, Taylor decides to close down the museum and sell the Twickum house. Richard and Emily invite Logan to dinner, and Lorelai begs to attend so she can meet him. Lorelai meets with an inn investor, which could mean travel in her future but would also mean selling the inn to a larger company.
108	21	"Blame Booze and Melville"	Jamie Babbit	Daniel Palladino	May 10, 2005	2T5321	5.39
The magazine comes out and Luke and Lorelai get a little too enthusiastic when celebrating. Sookie goes into labor. Luke is upset when he finds out that Kirk has put in a competing offer on the Twickham house. Luke and Kirk must appear before the town elders to settle the dispute, who rule in favor of Luke because everyone has been waiting for him to end up with Lorelai. Emily takes in a foreign ballerina, of whom she quickly tires. Rory is given a surprising review by Mitchum Huntzberger, who does not believe she has the makings of a reporter. Distraught, Rory tracks down Logan at a party and convinces him to steal a boat with her. Rory calls Lorelai from jail.
109	22	"A House Is Not a Home"	Amy Sherman-Palladino	Amy Sherman-Palladino	May 17, 2005	2T5322	5.89
After receiving a call from Rory, Lorelai goes to pick her up from the police station and takes her home. While on the way home, Logan calls Rory and Lorelai orders her not to talk to him, but she does anyway. Rory explains that the boat theft was not Logan's idea and Lorelai should not blame him. Lorelai goes to Luke and freaks out about what to do and how to act and Luke plays the fatherly type toward Rory while talking to Lorelai. Logan finds out that his father has upset Rory and says he will talk with his father, but Rory begs him not to. Rory tells Lorelai that she decided she will not be going back to Yale next year. Lorelai does not like this idea, fearing Rory may never return, so goes to her parents for help. Somewhere in between, Rory goes to her grandparents' to talk to them about her situation and convinces them to support her decision. When Lane's band feels their progress has stagnated, Mrs. Kim helps by setting up a summer tour of churches. Emily and Richard tell Lorelai that Rory will live in their pool house until she decides to go back to Yale. An upset Lorelai proposes to a stunned Luke after he shows unwavering support for Rory.

== DVD release ==
The Complete Fifth Season
Set details		Special features		
22 episodes; 6-disc set; 1.33:1 aspect ratio; 1.78:1 aspect ratio (international); Subtitles: English, Spanish and French; English (Dolby Digital 2.0 Surround)		Commentary by: Amy Sherman-Palladino and Dan Palladino on "You Jump, I Jump, Jack"; Gilmore Girls Turns 100 – Featurette on the 100th episode; Behind-the-Scenes of the 100th episode; Who Wants to Talk Gilmore? The Season's Wittiest Wordplay Moments; "Guide to Gilmorisms" booklet (available online only)		
Release dates
North America	United Kingdom	Continental Europe	Norway	Australia
December 13, 2005	January 18, 2010	August 16, 2006	January 24, 2007	September 6, 2006
