= Stars Hollow =

Fictional television show city

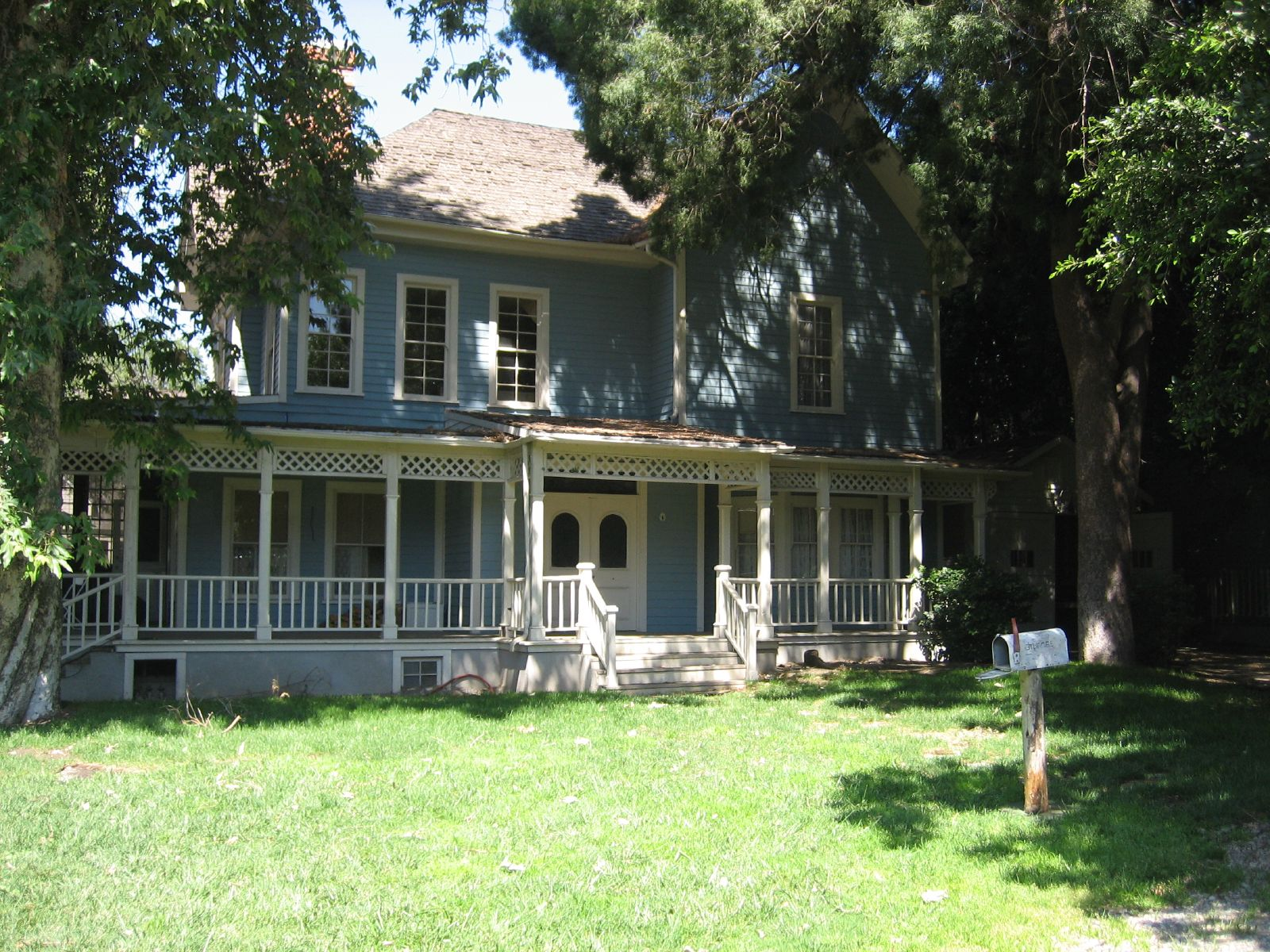
Lorelai Gilmore's house in Stars Hollow

Stars Hollow is a fictional town in Connecticut featured on the television show Gilmore Girls and the Netflix miniseries Gilmore Girls: A Year in the Life. It is the town in which the protagonists Lorelai Gilmore and her daughter Rory Gilmore reside. Stars Hollow is depicted as a close-knit community located roughly thirty minutes from the state capital of Hartford. The original town square set was located on the Warner Bros. Studios, Burbank backlot, just around the corner from the exterior set for the hospital in ER.

== History of Stars Hollow ==
=== Founding ===
The town of Stars Hollow was founded in 1779, but there are conflicting legends regarding how it got its name. The traditionally accepted story involves two star-crossed lovers who seemed destined never to be together, until separate cosmological phenomena involving stars led them to each other at the spot where the town now exists. This is celebrated annually at the Firelight Festival, shown in the season one episode "Star-Crossed Lovers and Other Strangers" and the season four episode "Nag Hamadi is Where They Found the Gnostic Gospels." Some residents of the town have been shown to doubt this story, like Luke Danes, who remarks it's just as likely the town is named after a hypothetical sex worker named Star.

Another story of Stars Hollow's founding was presented in the season five episode "To Die and Let Diorama." A talking display built in the new Stars Hollow Museum explained that a Puritan family first discovered the area while looking for a place to settle. The town therefore gained its name from their observation of "the stars, so bright; this forest, so hollow!"

=== The Revolutionary War ===
During the American Revolutionary War, a "battle" was fought in Stars Hollow involving 12 men who stood and waited for a group of incoming Redcoats who never arrived. This battle is re-enacted annually in the town square, as seen in season one, episode eight, "Love and War and Snow" and in season five, episode 11, "Women of Questionable Morals." This second occurrence marked the first addition of the town prostitute story, who is said to have slept with the British general to delay the troops.

A statue of Casimir Pulaski, Polish nobleman, soldier, and military commander who has been called, together with his counterpart Michael Kovats de Fabriczy, "the father of the American cavalry," sits across from the town square, next to Luke's Diner.

On the town square's gazebo is the town's Liberty Bell sign, which reads:

The bell at Stars Hollow was cast in 1780 to celebrate the first anniversary of the town. The bell cracked the first time it was rung and weighed 2080 pounds. The strike of the bell is E-flat. On 6 June 1944 when Allied forces landed in France, the sound of the bell was broadcast to all parts of the country.

=== Town Square ===
The center of town consists primarily of businesses surrounding a park with a gazebo. The town square is the location of Luke's Diner, Doose's Market, Miss Patty's dance studio (which hosts town meetings), the town's house of worship (which functions as both a Protestant church and synagogue), and the public high school. In the Gilmore Girls: A Year in the Life episode "Summer," the office of The Stars Hollow Gazette is shown to be located here as well.

The town square serves as a primary setting throughout Gilmore Girls and Gilmore Girls: A Year in the Life. Many town functions and private events are held in this area, including the Firelight Festival and the Battle of Stars Hollow. In the Gilmore Girls series finale "Bon Voyage," Rory's farewell party is held in a rainstorm under a tent in the park. The wedding of Lorelai and Luke takes place in the gazebo in "Fall," the fourth episode of Gilmore Girls: A Year in the Life.

=== Third Street ===
Third Street is the location of the Dragonfly Inn, which Lorelai and Sookie St. James purchase in season three after its previous owner, Fran Weston, dies in episode 20, "Say Goodnight, Gracie." The inn undergoes renovations throughout season four until its test-run opening in the season finale, episode 22, "Raincoats and Recipes." It remains Lorelai and Sookie's primary business for the rest of the show.

According to the Stars Hollow Historical Society, Third Street is among the town's worst historical landmarks to take your children. In the 18th century, it was known as "Sores and Boils Alley," where sick and suffering people throughout the region came to have sores and boils lanced. A small leper colony is said to have existed there as well.

In the sixth season's sixth episode, "Welcome to the Doll House," it's revealed that throughout history Third Street held various other names, aside from the aforementioned "Sores and Boils Alley," including "Constabulary Road," "Crusty Bulge," and a Nipmuc name, "Chargogagogmanchogagogcharbunagunggamog." The Nipmuc name is said to mean, "You fish on your side of the lake, I'll fish on my side, and no one will fish in the middle." According to Kirk Gleason, it could also mean "Buffalo." This place-name is based on the local name for a lake in Webster, Massachusetts, which is more formally known as Webster Lake.

== Location ==
Stars Hollow was inspired by, and is loosely based on, several real communities in Connecticut: the village of Washington, and the towns of West Hartford and New Milford. The population of Stars Hollow is close to 10,000 for the show. The show's creator, Amy Sherman-Palladino, spent three weeks at the Mayflower Grace in Washington, Connecticut, but had little experience with the state and otherwise had never been to it. Sherman-Palladino later said, "now, I've never been there in winter, when you're snowed in and you can't go anywhere, and you and your husband want to kill each other because you can't go to a movie. But at the time I was there, it was beautiful, it was magical, and it was feeling of warmth and small-town camaraderie. . .There was a longing for that in my own life, and I thought – that's something that I would really love to put out there."

The actual "Stars Hollow" in the opening sequence of every episode is not a location in Connecticut, but rather a view of South Royalton, Vermont. Unlike the 10,000 people suggested in the show, South Royalton numbers only around 700 residents against a total of just under 3000 in Royalton. The particular view depicted in the titlecard can be viewed along Mile 19 of the northbound lanes of Interstate 89 as the highway rounds a curve overlooking a scenic view of the White River Valley, with South Royalton directly in the middle of the vista.

Greg Morago of The Hartford Courant wrote, "unlike the Hartford depicted on Judging Amy, the Stars Hollow of The Gilmore Girls rings true. The town's antiques shops, small businesses, schools, government and infrastructure look the part. But where Sherman-Palladino has truly excelled, despite her Clueless origins, is in her drawing of colorful Connecticut characters. The populace of Stars Hollow, from the town busybody to the town troubadour, is familiar to any Nutmegger who ever attended a town meeting."
