= Pilot (Gilmore Girls) =

- Gilmore Girls episode
- Episode no.: Season 1 Episode 1
- Directed by: Lesli Linka Glatter
- Written by: Amy Sherman-Palladino
- Original air date: October 5, 2000

Guest appearances
- Liz Torres as Miss Patty; Jared Padalecki as Dean Forester; Emily Kuroda as Mrs. Kim; Alex Borstein as Drella

Episode chronology
← Previous —	Next → "The Lorelais' First Day At Chilton"

"Pilot" is the pilot episode of the American comedy-drama series Gilmore Girls. It originally aired on the WB in the United States on October 5, 2000. The episode was written by series creator Amy Sherman-Palladino and directed by Lesli Linka Glatter.

The pilot episode introduces the two main characters, Lorelai and Rory Gilmore, as well as Lorelai's parents and residents of the fictitious town of Stars Hollow, Connecticut. After Rory is accepted to the prestigious Chilton Preparatory School, Lorelai is forced to go to her wealthy parents for financial assistance. Her parents happily loan their daughter the money in exchange for an end to the estrangement and a family dinner every Friday night. Unfortunately, things hit a snag when a cute new transfer student flirts with Rory, leading the younger Gilmore to wonder whether leaving Stars Hollow High is really what she wants.

== Plot ==
The show begins with shots introducing the fictitious town of Stars Hollow, Connecticut, home of Lorelai and Rory Gilmore. Lorelai is a 32-year-old single mother who is so close to her 15-year-old daughter, Rory, that many people mistake them for sisters. The show opens at the local diner Luke's, run by Luke Danes, where the girls go every morning. Lorelai has a special relationship with the owner and an addiction to caffeine. She squares off with the owner on a daily basis over just how much coffee she's allowed to have. While getting coffee, an unsuspecting male hits on both of the Gilmore girls, separately. This displays some of the quirky problems the Gilmore girls have. Clearly, there are hazards in being a mother and daughter pair so close in age.

Next, the scene shifts to Lorelai working at the Independence Inn. There's Michel Gerard, a rude French man who runs the front desk, an unbelievably sassy harp player, and Sookie St. James, the chef. Meanwhile, we find out that Rory who is wearing her cream color cable knitted oversized sweater is the kind of girl who is more interested in academic pursuits and reading Gustave Flaubert's novel Madame Bovary, than worrying about clothes and boys. Her mother Lorelai reaches out and grabs Rory's sweater and then pulls her towards her as her mother told Rory "Kiss." But unbeknownst to Rory there is a new guy in town, and he has his eyes set on her. Rory and her best friend, Lane Kim hang out after school and discuss an upcoming teen hayride. Rory wouldn't be caught dead at the event, but Lane has strict parents who are trying to set her up with the son of a business colleague.

The real story is that Rory hears she has been accepted to the exclusive prep school Chilton, which typically means guaranteed admission to Harvard. Rory is psyched, but Lorelai gets a rude awakening: the school wants a pricey enrollment fee in addition to first semester's tuition. And they want it pronto. Lorelai doesn't have the money, but can't bear the thought of disappointing her daughter. The only thing left for her to do is ask her wealthy parents. But that's not such an easy task since Lorelai's relationship with her parents is beyond strained. As a teenager, Lorelai didn't exactly fulfill her parents' high expectations. Lorelai does indeed end up asking her parents for money, where she receives quite the chilly reception. When she asks for the money, they agree, since it is really for Rory, but have one minor condition. Lorelai's mother, Emily, demands that she get to see her daughter and granddaughter once a week. That means dinner every Friday night. Lorelai hesitates, but agrees.

At school, Rory is explaining to Lane about Chilton when she bumps into Dean Forester, the new kid from Chicago who has been eyeing Rory. They talk and Rory begins to really like Dean. Just how hard she falls for him isn't revealed until later when she tells her mom that she doesn't want to go to Chilton anymore. Lorelai is confused and astounded, but Rory doesn't back down. When the truth comes out, Lorelai flips out and says she will not allow her daughter to throw her life away for some random guy. Rory is going to Chilton whether she wants to or not.

When the Gilmore girls go to the grandparents' house for dinner, the whole night turns into a big disaster. Lorelai's father starts talking about Rory's dad, Christopher, and all the success he has had with his Internet startup in California. This causes Lorelai to have a mini-breakdown. She and Emily end up fighting in the kitchen, and Rory overhears every word... including the part about paying for Chilton. When it's all over, Rory recognizes her mom's bravery and agrees to go to Chilton. The episode ends with the Gilmore girls sitting in Luke's diner talking.

== Production ==
=== Development ===
The pilot episode received financial support from the script development fund of the Family Friendly Programming Forum, which includes some of the nation's leading advertisers, making it one of the first network shows to reach the air with such funding.

Luke Danes, portrayed by Scott Patterson was initially supposed to be a woman in the pilot's original script. Additionally, several minor characters such as Judy Tolan and Mrs. Langworthy were cut from the original script and multiple scenes were switched around or merged.

Featured music included "There She Goes" by The La's, "I Try" by Macy Gray, "Where the Colors Don't Go" by Sam Phillips, "My Little Corner of the World" by Yo La Tengo, "Wendy" by Wesley Yang & Gavin McNett, "Ballet Waltz #3" by Herman Beeftink, and "Heartland" by George Strait.

=== Filming ===
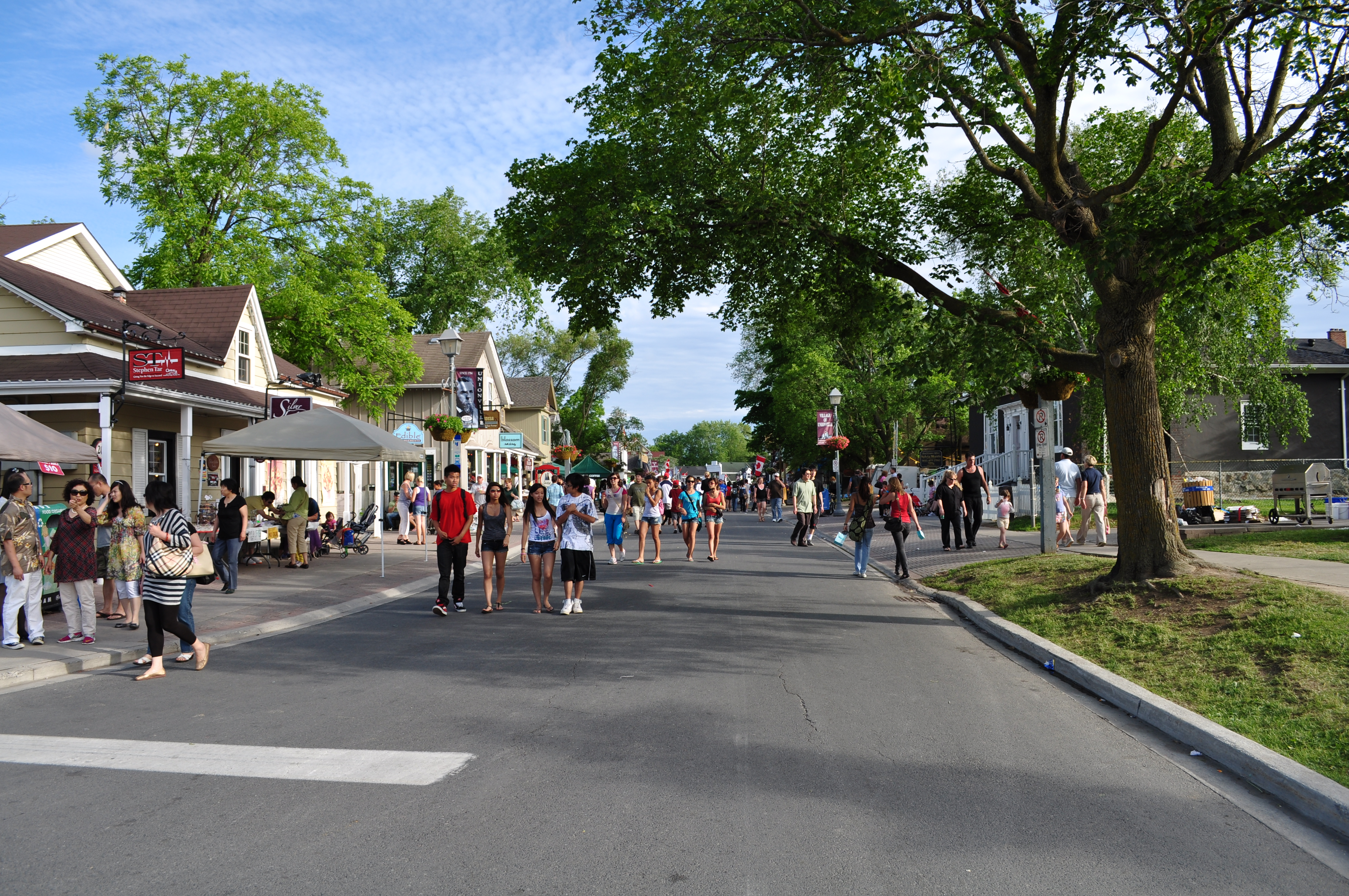
View of Unionville's Main Street, where the pilot was filmed

The pilot was shot in Unionville, Ontario near Toronto while the rest of the series was filmed in Burbank, California at the Warner Bros. lot.

=== Unaired pilot ===
The series was approved though the original pilot never aired and continued the same story with some changes to the main cast. In the "Unaired pilot", the character Sookie St. James was played by Alex Borstein and the character of Dean Forester was played by Nathan Wetherington. Alex Borstein's MADtv contract prevented her from continuing in the role, which was recast with Melissa McCarthy. Borstein made recurring appearances on Gilmore Girls throughout the show's run, first as the harpist Drella, then as Miss Celine and Doris.

== Reception ==
On the original airing of this episode, Gilmore Girls set network records for its time period in women 18–34 (2.9/9), women 18–49 (2.7/8) and households (3.5/6). It also tied the network mark for its timeslot in adults 18–34 (2.2/7).

While rewatching the series, David Sims of The A.V. Club called it "a pretty strong piece of television". He concluded his review, writing: "The pilot just gives us the basics, but this heady poultice is already brewing away."
