= Sookie St. James =

Fictional character

- 'Gilmore Girls' character
- First appearance: "Pilot" (Gilmore Girls)
- Last appearance: Gilmore Girls: A Year in the Life (2016)
- Created by: Amy Sherman-Palladino
- Portrayed by: Melissa McCarthy

In-universe information
- Full name: Sookie St. James
- Nicknames: Sook; The Maestro
- Gender: Female
- Occupation: Chef; Inn owner
- Family: Davey Belleville(son); Martha Belleville(daughter); Odell (cousin); Beau Belleville; Rune (cousin-in-law)
- Spouse: Jackson Belleville
- Children: 2 (plus pregnant with a third at series end)
- Home: Stars Hollow, Connecticut
- Nationality: American
- Friends: Lorelai Gilmore; Rory Gilmore

Sookie St. James is a fictional character, who appears on the American television series Gilmore Girls (2000–2007). Created by Amy Sherman-Palladino and portrayed by actress Melissa McCarthy, She appears in all of the show's 153 episodes, from its premiere on October 5, 2000, to its finale on May 15, 2007.

== Character overview ==
In her original appearance Sookie is introduced as a lovably awkward, funny, and neurotically perfectionistic, passionate, and very talented chef at the Independence Inn in the fictional town of Stars Hollow, Connecticut. Sookie’s passion for cooking and her innovative approach to culinary arts are some of the most important characteristics of her personality from the very outset, which are very often associated with physical comedy and infectious energy. While her perfectionism and culinary expertise are balanced by her kind nature and friendship with Lorelai Gilmore that continues to be one of the features of her narrative, Sookie’s character also has its share of emotional complexity and loyalty, including her roles in both comic relief and her relationship with Lorelai in their later business venture together, the Dragonfly Inn.

Her personal life also involves a long-term romantic relationship with Jackson Belleville, whose character is introduced in the series when he delivers produce to the inn. Sookie and Jackson’s relationship evolves from playfulness and conflict to a long-term partnership that ends in marriage. The dynamic between Jackson and Sookie is defined by their respective support for each other as well as their passion for their trades. Sookie's long-term relationship with Jackson, starting from dating to being married and raising kids, is portrayed in the series in a real, funny, and honest way.

In A Year in the Life, it is revealed that Sookie has taken a leave of absence from the Dragonfly Inn to work at Blue Hill Farm in New York, returning briefly to prepare Lorelai’s wedding cake.

== Role ==
Sookie St. James is introduced in the pilot episode of Gilmore Girls as a chef and Lorelai’s confidant and business partner at the Independence Inn in Star Hollow. Sookie’s life as a character is largely committed to her job as the chef at the Independence Inn, where she spends most of her time experimenting with new recipes and perfecting her craft. Apart from her job, she is frequently shown to be in the company of her best friend Lorelai Gilmore (Lauren Graham). Her competitive side is revealed when she and Luke Danes (Scott Patterson) are both asked to provide food for the memorial party that is held in honor of Babette and Morey’s cat, Cinnamon. After an idle comment from Lorelai about the lack of her romantic life, she begins to question her personal life and eventually starts off her romance with Jackson Matthew Belleville (Jackson Douglas), who turns out to be the produce supplier for the Independence Inn. With Lorelai’s help in preparing for the date, Sookie and Jackson meet at Luke’s Diner, which serves as the launch pad for their romance.

Sookie later invites Lorelai, Rory (Alexis Bledel), and Lane to accompany her to a concert by The Bangles in New York City, an outing that becomes one of the characters’ more notable social excursions. As her relationship with Jackson develops, Sookie confronts challenges associated with her strong attachment to her kitchen, particularly when Jackson attempts to cook for her. The pair attend the Stars Hollow Firelight Festival together, and throughout this period Sookie continues to support Lorelai during several major developments in the latter’s personal life, including Christopher Hayden’s return, the reappearance of Luke’s former partner Rachel, and Lorelai’s deepening relationship with Max Medina.

Sookie helps Lorelai plan the town celebration in response to her engagement to Max and is also the co-chair for Lorelai’s bachelorette party. Moreover, she also offers a lot of food diversity as Jess Mariano comes to Stars Hollow. However, there is a problem when Lorelai hears that Mia intends to sell Independence Inn, and she gets angry at Sookie in fear of their future. Then, when Lorelai clarifies the reason behind her anger, they make amends, and the problem gets resolved.

During the annual Stars Hollow charity basket auction, Sookie’s basket is unexpectedly purchased by Kirk Gleason. Jackson later explains that he refrained from bidding in an effort to signal his wish for the couple to consider moving in together. Although Sookie expresses willingness to take this step, Jackson ultimately declines, leaving Sookie unsettled by the misunderstanding.

=== Relationships ===
Jackson Belleville

Sookie meets Jackson Belleville through their work at the Independence Inn, where she serves as the head chef and he supplies the kitchen’s produce. Their interactions, initially defined by light disagreements over vegetables and sourcing, gradually develop into a mutual attraction. By the end of the first season, Sookie asks Jackson on a date, marking the beginning of their romantic relationship. During the second season, their partnership becomes more serious. After a period of steady courtship, Jackson proposes, and the couple marry later that year. Their marriage continues to develop through the subsequent seasons, reflecting both the everyday challenges and stability of their relationship.

Sookie and Jackson begin building a family soon afterward. Their first child is born in the third season, followed by a second in the fifth. By the conclusion of the seventh season, Sookie is expecting their third child, underscoring their role as one of the series’ central family units.

Alongside these personal milestones, the couple’s professional lives also evolve. When Sookie and Lorelai Gilmore open the Dragonfly Inn, Jackson remains closely connected to their work as the inn’s primary produce supplier. In later storylines, including those referenced in the revival, Sookie temporarily steps away from the inn to pursue other culinary interests, while she and Jackson continue their life together with their children.

== Portrayal ==
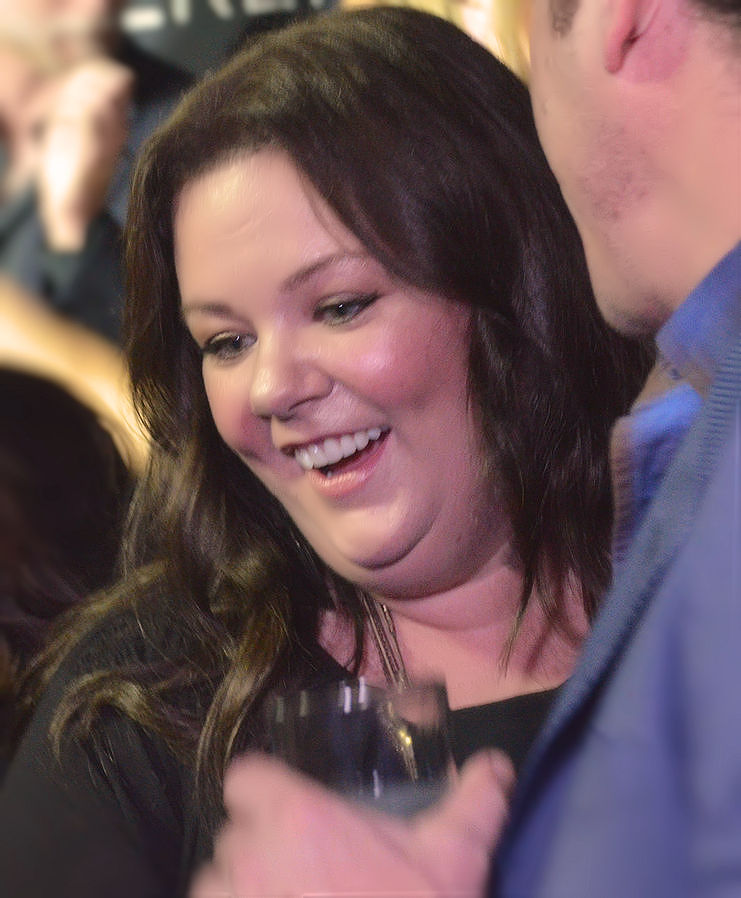
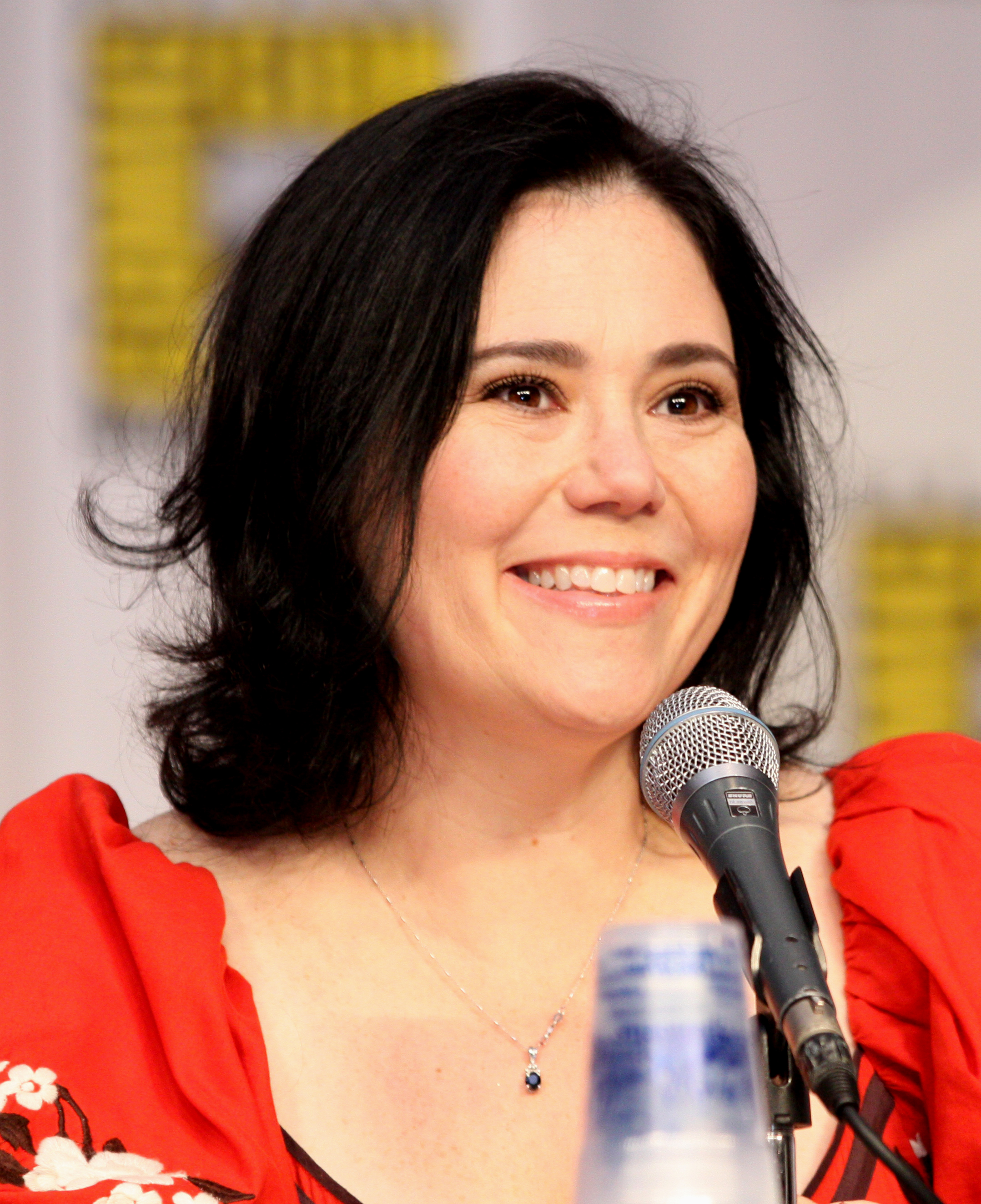
Melissa McCarthy, who played the role (left) and Alex Borstein, who was initially offered the role (right)

The role of Sookie St. James was nearly given to Alex Borstein, but Borstein was unavailable due to scheduling conflicts. Borstein made recurring appearances on Gilmore Girls throughout the show's run, first as the harpist Drella and later as the stylist Miss Celine. Melissa McCarthy was eventually cast, but not without some resistance: according to Sherman-Palladino, the creator of the series, she "had to fight" for the part. The role was written with no body type or physical description in mind, so Sherman‑Palladino insisted on finding someone "funny who really could act."

The audition by McCarthy reportedly convinced Palladino that she was the perfect person for the role. Throughout the series' seven seasons, McCarthy played Sookie, from 2000 to 2007.

When the show was revived for the 2016 four‑part continuation Gilmore Girls: A Year in the Life, there was initially uncertainty over whether McCarthy would return. Reports noted that due to her busy film career, scheduling a full role was “a tricky sell.” In the end, McCarthy made a cameo, reflecting both her real‑life status and the production’s willingness to accommodate her schedule.

== Reception ==
Critics and fans have praised McCarthy’s portrayal of Sookie for balancing humor with emotional depth. Entertainment Weekly praises Sookie as a beloved and memorable character, highlighting her charming clumsiness in the kitchen and her creative, perfectionist approach to cooking. Her mix of comedic mishaps and heartfelt moments demonstrates both humor and emotional depth. In a 2024 article titled “10 Reasons Sookie St. James From Gilmore Girls Is The Best BFF On TV,” the website Brit + Co described Sookie as “the friend we all need.” The piece highlights her selflessness (for example, offering to sell her car to help pay for another character’s education), loyalty to her friends, forgiving nature, honest communication, and general generosity.

Hayley Wilbur of MIC praised Sookie, and McCarthy’s portrayal, as a body‑positive example whose weight is never treated as a joke, allowing her romantic, career, and personal storylines the same dignity as other characters. This representation resonated with audiences who rarely saw women like her succeed on TV. CBR describe Sookie as “one of the most empathetic fat leads in TV history,” praising her as a fully realized, nuanced character whose size is not her defining feature, but just one aspect of her identity.

== Cultural impact ==
The culinary creations of Sookie have become a memorable part of the legacy of Gilmore Girls. An article from Spoon University lists several of her dishes, from baked Alaska, cheese puffs, and mac-and-cheese to more treats like a “raspberry, kumquat, sugar cookie cake,” among the most foods the show produced. Fans often recount how Sookie’s meals enhanced the show’s cozy small-town-meets-gourmet vibe and made the idea of a “Stars Hollow dinner” into an iconic pop-culture fantasy.

Food played a central role in the show, with characters frequently sharing meals or hosting dinners—Sookie’s role as chef helped elevate cooking from mere background detail to a meaningful element. As one fan-blogger recounted after recreating a dish from every episode, “food is its own character on the show.” Her flamboyant dishes, the imaginative menus, and her commitment to “elevated comfort food” helped shape how many viewers think about food in real life, inspiring cooking experiments, themed dinners, and even home-cooked tributes to the show. A vinyl figurine of Sookie St. James has been released as part of the broader range of Gilmore Girls merchandise.

== See also ==
- List of Gilmore Girls characters
- List of Gilmore Girls episodes
- Lorelai Gilmore
