= Gilmore Girls season 3 =

Gilmore Girls
- Season 3
- Season 3 DVD cover
- Showrunner: Amy Sherman-Palladino
- Starring: Lauren Graham; Alexis Bledel; Melissa McCarthy; Keiko Agena; Yanic Truesdale; Scott Patterson; Liza Weil; Jared Padalecki; Milo Ventimiglia; Sean Gunn; Kelly Bishop; Edward Herrmann
- No. of episodes: 22

Release
- Original network: The WB
- Original release: September 24, 2002 – May 20, 2003

Season chronology
- ← Previous; Season 2 Next → Season 4

The third season of Gilmore Girls, an American comedy drama television series, began airing on September 24, 2002, on The WB. The season concluded on May 20, 2003, after 22 episodes. The season aired on Tuesdays at 8:00 pm.

On March 25, 2003, The WB announced that the show was renewed for a fourth season.

== Overview ==
Lorelai has to break the news to Richard and Emily that she and Christopher aren't getting back together, although this does result in her mending her rift with Luke. Rory is estranged from Christopher for a time but later gets back in touch, resulting in the girls attending Sherry's baby shower and supporting her in labor until Christopher arrives. Lorelai has trouble getting back into dating, receiving a dinner invite from Kirk, intermittently dating Alex (the business partner of an old friend of Sookie's), and having a brief reunion with Max.

Rory tries to forget about her kiss with Jess by throwing herself into her relationship with Dean, but Dean breaks up with her when she spends a dance marathon obsessing over Jess and his girlfriend, Shane. Rory and Jess begin dating, but Rory finds Jess isn't as attentive or reliable as Dean was. Dean starts dating one of her old classmates, Lindsay Lister, and they become engaged. Jess takes a job at Walmart to buy a car and skips class to take extra shifts. He is told he hasn't done enough to graduate and, as a result, can't take Rory to the prom. He acts out by trying to pressure Rory in to having sex, and engages in a fist fight with Dean. After a visit from his estranged father, Jimmy, Jess leaves town without telling Luke or Rory. He reconnects with Jimmy in California.

Lane finds a band to be drummer with and Lorelai and Rory let them practice in the garage. Lane starts dating bandmate Dave Rygalski in secret, using her mother's preferred prom date Young Chui as cover. Things become complicated when Yung Chui stupidly falls in love with Lane, and Dave won't be able to take Lane to the prom because her mother doesn't approve. Lane gets drunk at a party, eagerly calls her mother and tells her everything. Dave pleads their case and Mrs. Kim lets them go to the prom together, but still grounds Lane afterwards. Paris starts dating Jamie, a student from Princeton that she and Rory met in Washington D.C., but falls out with Rory when she thinks Rory told student council rival Francie about her and Jamie. However, it's Rory that Paris turns to when she sleeps with Jamie, fails to get into Harvard, and ultimately has a nervous breakdown. Luke rents the premises next to the diner to Taylor, who plans to open a soda shop. Luke ends up dating Taylor's solicitor, Nicole Leahy.

Richard takes Lorelai and Rory on a trip to Yale, where he has secretly set up an interview for Rory. Lorelai is incensed, especially when Rory makes Yale one of her backup applications, but they both realize it is where Rory really wants to go. Richard gives Lorelai $75,000 from an investment he made when she was born and she uses it to pay her parents back for Rory's school fees. Emily interprets this as Lorelai cutting ties with them and there is a falling out. Richard's financial gift results in Rory being refused financial aid.

The Independence Inn is gutted by a fire and Lorelai, Sookie and Michel struggle to keep it open as a B&B. Lorelai and Sookie renew plans to buy the Dragonfly Inn after Fran dies. Sookie discovers she is pregnant. Independence Inn closes and Lorelai is unable to afford the Dragonfly Inn since she needs to pay Rory's university fees. Rory borrows the money from Richard and Emily in return for reinstating Friday night dinners.

Lorelai and Rory are planning to go backpacking in Europe while Luke is planning to go on a cruise with Nicole. Lorelai and Sookie are able to buy the Dragonfly Inn now that Lorelai doesn't have to pay for Yale. Rory gives the valedictorian's speech at graduation, paying tribute to her grandparents and Lorelai, and the season ends with Rory and Lorelai looking around Chilton for the last time.

== Cast ==
=== Main cast ===
- Lauren Graham as Lorelai Gilmore, Rory's mother.
- Alexis Bledel as Rory Gilmore, Lorelai's daughter.
- Melissa McCarthy as Sookie St. James, Lorelai's best friend and co-worker.
- Keiko Agena as Lane Kim, Rory's best friend.
- Yanic Truesdale as Michel Gerard, Lorelai and Sookie's co-worker.
- Scott Patterson as Luke Danes, the owner of the local diner.
- Liza Weil as Paris Geller, Rory's classmate and good friend.
- Jared Padalecki as Dean Forester, Rory's ex-boyfriend.
- Milo Ventimiglia as Jess Mariano, Luke's nephew and Rory's boyfriend.
- Sean Gunn as Kirk Gleason, a resident of Stars Hollow who works a lot of jobs.
- Kelly Bishop as Emily Gilmore, Lorelai's mother and Rory's grandmother.
- Edward Herrmann as Richard Gilmore, Lorelai's father and Rory's grandfather.

=== Recurring cast ===
- Teal Redmann as Louise Grant, Paris's best friend.
- Shelly Cole as Madeline Lynn, Paris's best friend.
- Liz Torres as Miss Patty, the owner of the local dance studio.
- Jackson Douglas as Jackson Belleville, Sookie's husband.
- Adam Brody as Dave Rygalski, Lane's boyfriend and bandmate.
- Emily Kuroda as Mrs. Kim, Lane's religious mother.
- Michael Winters as Taylor Doose, the owner of the local grocery store.
- Sally Struthers as Babette Dell, Lorelai and Rory's nextdoor neighbor.
- Scott Cohen as Max Medina, Lorelai's ex-fiance.
- Todd Lowe as Zack Van Gerbig, Lane's bandmate.
- John Cabrera as Brian Fuller, Lane's bandmate.
- Dakin Matthews as Headmaster Hanlin Charleston, the principal of Chilton.
- Tricia O'Kelley as Nicole Leahy, Luke's girlfriend.
- Biff Yeager as Tom, a resident of Stars Hollow.
- Emily Bergl as Francie Jarvis, Rory's classmate and nemesis.
- Arielle Kebbel as Lindsay Lister, Dean's girlfriend.
- Rose Abdoo as Gypsy, the owner of the local auto shop.
- Mädchen Amick as Sherry Tinsdale, Christopher's fiance.
- Alan Blumenfeld as Rabbi David Barans, a rabbi at the local synagogue.
- Mike Gandolfi as Andrew, the owner of the local bookstore.
- Jim Jansen as Reverend Archie Skinner, a priest at the local church.
- Grant Lee Phillips as Grant, the town troubadour.
- Ted Rooney as Morey Dell, Babette's husband and Rory and Lorelai's nextdoor neighbor.
- Aris Alvarado as Caesar, an employee at Luke's diner.
- Adam Wylie as Brad Langford, Rory's classmate and good friend.

=== Guest ===
- Marion Ross as Lorelai 'Trix' Gilmore the First, Richard's mother, Lorelai's grandmother, and Rory's great-grandmother.
- David Sutcliffe as Christopher Hayden, Rory's father and Lorelai's ex-boyfriend.
- Scout Taylor Compton as Clara Forester, Dean's younger sister.

== Episodes ==
No. overall	No. in season	Title	Directed by	Written by	Original release date	Prod. code	US viewers (millions)
44	1	"Those Lazy-Hazy-Crazy Days"	Amy Sherman-Palladino	Amy Sherman-Palladino	September 24, 2002	175001	6.20
Amidst her sadness about Christopher returning to Sherry, Lorelai has an intriguing dream about Luke. Rory returns from Washington to realize that she still may have feelings for Jess, but a chance encounter at the First Annual Stars Hollow End of Summer Madness Festival makes her realize that he may have moved on to someone else. Sookie and Jackson argue over decorating their house. Lorelai tells Rory not to string Dean along if she really wants to be with Jess. Emily and Richard fight over Lorelai and Christopher's lack of a relationship. Rory once again guides Paris through the rocky shoals of preparing for a date.
45	2	"Haunted Leg"	Chris Long	Amy Sherman-Palladino	October 1, 2002	175002	6.75
To Lorelai's horror, Kirk asks her out on a date after being encouraged by Luke. Over lunch Emily attempts to convince Lorelai that Christopher does not love Sherry, but Lorelai does not want to talk about the matter. Christopher shows up uninvited at Friday night dinner and quarrels with both Lorelai and Rory, and accuses Lorelai of turning Rory against him. Emily asks him to leave and Lorelai tells him to give everyone time. Rory runs into Jess and they each betray their hurt feelings -- Rory about Shane and Jess about not hearing from Rory all summer. Francie threatens to make trouble if Rory does not stop Paris from running the student council like a dictatorship after Paris refuses to consider a change in the dress code.
46	3	"Application Anxiety"	Gail Mancuso	Daniel Palladino	October 8, 2002	175003	5.95
Rory's application for Harvard arrives, plunging Rory, Lorelai and Emily into a frenzy. A Chilton seminar on college applications only adds to Rory and Paris's anxieties. Taylor steamrollers Luke into opening a soda shop next to the diner. Lane places an ad in the paper for a band and finds a musical soul mate. Lorelai and Rory have lunch with a seemingly picture-perfect Harvard alumnus and his family, which may assure her chances of acceptance. Rory meets the family's one daughter who does not subscribe to Ivy League aspirations, which helps Rory appreciate that her mother values her happiness about all else. Dean has a talk with Rory about their future after she goes to Harvard, and his pessimism catches her off-guard.
47	4	"One's Got Class and the Other One Dyes"	Steve Robman	Daniel Palladino	October 15, 2002	175004	5.79
Lorelai's stint in the Stars Hollow High School local business success speakers forum gets derailed when students ask about her teen pregnancy, much to the delight of Luke and the consternation of some PTA mothers. The mothers confront Lorelai afterwards, prompting her to defend herself. Luke and Jess argue about the women in and out of their lives (and their closets). Lane alleviates her frustration about her mother's strict household and the future of her band by dying her hair purple. She quickly panics and Rory helps Lane to dye it back to black before Mrs. Kim discovers what happened. Lane keeps a polaroid to remember her act of rebellion. Rory runs into Shane one too many times and succumbs to a severe bout of snarkiness.
48	5	"Eight O'Clock at the Oasis"	Joe Ann Fogle	Justin Tanner	October 22, 2002	175005	6.58
Lorelai attends Emily's society auction where she meets a very handsome man, but neglects to get his number, forcing her to ask her mother for it. After a disastrous first date, Lorelai turns down an invitation to another, not realizing that Emily and Richard have a lot invested in her dating this son of their friends. Lorelai and Rory agree to water their new neighbor's lawn while he is out of town, and discover the house is a divorced man's dream home inside. When the lawn's sprinkler system malfunctions, Jess comes to Rory's rescue.
49	6	"Take the Deviled Eggs..."	Jamie Babbit	Daniel Palladino	November 5, 2002	175006	6.95
Lorelai chauffeurs Rory to Sherry's baby shower in Boston and finds herself dragged into the festivities against her will. Rory has to help Lorelai calm down when Sherry informs Lorelai that baby will be a girl and she credits Lorelai with making Christopher a better man. Miss Patty gets a new beau. Jess comes home with a car and Luke tries to find out where he got the money to pay for it. Stars Hollow's town loner attempts to mount a demonstration, but things go awry when his banner tears and no one can understand what he is yelling. Rory and Lorelai take out their frustrations by throwing left-over deviled eggs from the baby shower at Jess's car.
50	7	"They Shoot Gilmores, Don't They?"	Kenny Ortega	Amy Sherman-Palladino	November 12, 2002	175007	6.82
Lorelai is determined to win the Stars Hollow Dance Marathon and wrest the trophy from four-time champion Kirk, but she has trouble getting a partner until she finally convinces Rory to help her dance her way to victory. Dean sits on the sidelines to cheer his girl on, and is soon joined by Jess and Shane, who spend their time making out while Jess keeps his eye on Rory. Dave tries to make Mrs. Kim warm to him by posing as a devout Christian. Lorelai breaks her heel, and Dean takes her place while Luke plays shoe repairman. On the dance floor, Dean can no longer ignore that Rory is attracted to Jess and breaks up with her. Rory tearfully runs off, followed closely by Jess, and Kirk is declared the winner once again.
51	8	"Let the Games Begin"	Steve Robman	Amy Sherman-Palladino & Sheila R. Lawrence	November 19, 2002	175008	7.09
In the aftermath of the Dance Marathon, Kirk parades around Stars Hollow with the trophy until someone steals it, while Lorelai and Rory painfully inch their way towards Luke's. After Lorelai tells Luke about Rory and Jess, he breaks up their first kiss as a couple and lays down some ground rules. Lorelai and Rory reluctantly agree to accept Richard's invitation to accompany him and Emily to his Whiffenpoof reunion at Yale. While there, he springs a surprise admissions interview on Rory. Lorelai is angry Richard is pressuring Rory to go to Yale, and Rory is upset she could not properly prepare. Back from New Haven, Lorelai and Rory head for Luke's, and Jess and Rory finally get to have their first kisses. Rory visits Dean to apologize and tell him she really did not want to hurt him and she wants him to know she really loved him, no matter how things ended between them. Late at night, Lorelai and Rory each curl up with some bedtime reading -- the Yale brochure.
52	9	"A Deep-Fried Korean Thanksgiving"	Kenny Ortega	Daniel Palladino	November 26, 2002	175009	6.30
It is Thanksgiving and Lorelai and Rory have dinner at four different places: the Kims', where Lane has managed to get Dave invited and Lorelai is forced to eat tofurkey; Luke's, with Luke and Jess; Sookie's, where Jackson and his family have deep-fried the turkey, the lawn and just about everything else; and Emily and Richard's, where, to Lorelai's horror, Rory reveals that she has applied to Yale. Kirk gets a cat, with disastrous results. Dave asks Lane out, and then kisses her. Paris is afraid her difficulty finding a shelter volunteer position will impact her acceptance to Harvard. Dean faces off with Jess and lets him know that it is no more "Mr. Nice Guy" for Mr. Forester.
53	10	"That'll Do, Pig"	Jamie Babbit	Sheila R. Lawrence	January 14, 2003	175010	5.75
Lorelai's grandmother, Trix, arrives in Hartford unexpectedly on Richard's birthday and announces that she is moving back to the US, throwing Emily into a tizzy until she follows Lorelai's advice on how to manage her mother-in-law. Rory declares war on Francie after she pulls a runaround on Paris with the Student Council. Paris finds herself in love after spending Christmas vacation with Jamie's family. After Rory and Dean bump into each other a few times, they decide to be friends again. Jess initially declines Rory's offer to attend the Stars Hollow High Winter Carnival, but changes his mind after they run into Dean and his sister Clara, who invites Rory to join them. Jess gets Dean alone at the carnival and lets him know that he is wise to his plans to get Rory back.
54	11	"I Solemnly Swear"	Carla McCloskey	John Stephens	January 21, 2003	175011	5.19
Offers of dates ensue when Lorelai and Sookie attend a seminar on operating an inn and run into two handsome men, an old friend of Sookie's and his business partner, Alex. Sookie tells her old friend that she is married, but feels guilty for having even attracted the interest of another man. When she makes an apology dinner for Jackson, he mistakenly assumes she cheated on him. Lorelai unsuccessfully resists being deposed when her mother is sued by a former maid for wrongful termination. Despite her best efforts, Lorelai cannot bring herself to paint a flattering picture of her mother. After Rory and Francie butt heads at the student council meeting, Francie proposes a truce and then immediately lies to Paris that Rory is trying to undermine her. Paris is crushed that her best friend has betrayed her and lashes out at her during their fencing class.
55	12	"Lorelai Out of Water"	Jamie Babbit	Janet Leahy	January 28, 2003	175012	5.19
Luke is opposed to having Taylor's attorney Nicole oversee the paperwork for the construction of the new soda shop until he meets the attractive redhead, who takes as immediate a shine to Luke as he does to her. Lane's clever scheme to get her mother's permission to attend the prom horribly backfires when Mrs. Kim presents Lane with a suitable Korean boy. Luke offers to teach Lorelai the fine art of angling after Alex invites her to go fishing. Rory and Lorelai clear out their severely cluttered garage for Lane's band. Lane and Rory have some heart-to-hearts about the men in their lives. Paris ratchets up the conflict between her and Rory when she calls for Rory's impeachment by the student council. This is brought to a swift end by Headmaster Charleston, who threatens to revoke his glowing letters of recommendation to Harvard if the girls cannot behave maturely. Rory is open to reconcile, but Paris is not. Alex quickly realizes Lorelai has never fished a day in her life.
56	13	"Dear Emily and Richard"	Gail Mancuso	Amy Sherman-Palladino	February 4, 2003	175013	6.20
Luke and Nicole have a successful first date. Jess and Dean trade verbal blows. Sherry goes into labor early, so only Lorelai and Rory are able to be there until Chris shows up at last minute. Lorelai remembers being pregnant as a teenager and going to the hospital alone. Emily and Richard rushed to the hospital once they discovered Lorelai was gone and Emily scolded her daughter for leaving an insultingly short note. In the present, Lorelai realizes Emily is lonely because Richard has been traveling for work so often, and so she gets Emily a new DVD player and some classic movies. Richard and Emily decry Lorelai's and Rory's plans to backpack through Europe. The war between Paris and Rory continues when Paris picks a photo of the "Franklin" staff for the yearbook that has the worst possible shot of Rory.
57	14	"Swan Song"	Chris Long	Daniel Palladino	February 11, 2003	175014	5.19
Emily guilts Rory into bringing Jess to a Friday night dinner, which turns out to be an unqualified disaster. Lorelai, Alex, Sookie and Jackson go to New York for the weekend. Jess gets a black eye in an altercation with an opponent he is too embarrassed to reveal to anyone but Luke. Zack and Brian realize that Lane and Dave are hiding something from them, but miss the mark on the true nature of the secret. Rory and Jess have their first argument, and Luke helps patch things up.
58	15	"Face-Off"	Kenny Ortega	John Stephens	February 18, 2003	175015	5.75
The Doose clan invades the Inn for their family reunion. Trix comes for a short visit and drives Emily crazy until she finally finds something scandalous: Trix has a secret boyfriend. Lane and Dave cook up a fake-date scheme with Young Chui to get Mrs. Kim to allow Lane to date Dave, but neither Young Chui's real girlfriend nor Dave is immune to a little jealousy. The Stars Hollow High hockey team reaches the regional semifinals for the first time in 40 years and everyone not attending the monster truck rally turns out to cheer the team on and endure Kirk's hopelessly inept play-by-play. After Jess's aloof attitude about making plans leaves Rory sitting home alone for most of the weekend, she takes Lorelai's advice and heads for the hockey game, where she discovers that Dean has a new girlfriend, Lindsay. Just as Rory is ready to snap, Jess arrives with concert tickets and she is taken aback.
59	16	"The Big One"	Jamie Babbit	Amy Sherman-Palladino	February 25, 2003	175016	6.21
Rory and Paris compete for the honor of speaking at Chilton's Bicentennial. Sookie and Jackson learn she is pregnant. Paris and Rory reconcile. Lorelai runs into Max and it is apparent that they are not quite over each other yet. Paris sleeps with Jamie and then has a meltdown on national television when she fails to get into Harvard, thinking her sleeping with Jamie is the cause. Rory's college acceptance letters finally arrive. Paris is not sure what to think about the latest development in her relationship with Jamie.
60	17	"A Tale of Poes and Fire"	Chris Long	Daniel Palladino	April 15, 2003	175017	4.23
A fire at the Independence Inn forces Lorelai to relocate its guests to her own house and those of her friends, and leaves her spending the night at Luke's, where she reveals her dream of being married to him and pregnant with their twins. Sookie invades Luke's with staff in tow to prepare breakfast for the Inn's guests and gets into a culinary groove with Luke after a rocky start. Questions arise about Jess' attendance at school when he receives the Employee of the Month award from Wal-Mart, and Luke discovers that he is working there more than full time. Lorelai and Rory start picking up on weird and somewhat unfriendly vibes coming from Nicole and Lindsay. Rory visits Paris, who has missed five days of school to take to her bed and hide from the world, and prompts her to stop watching soaps, call Jamie, tell her parents about Harvard, get a life plan, and rejoin the land of the living. After making extensive pro-con lists in an effort to decide whether to attend Harvard, Yale, or Princeton, Rory has a heart-to-heart with Lorelai and chooses Yale.
61	18	"Happy Birthday, Baby"	Gail Mancuso	Amy Sherman-Palladino	April 22, 2003	175018	5.10
Emily and Richard rejoice when Rory announces her decision to attend Yale. Kirk sustains baking-related injuries when Rory secretly enlists the help of her fellow Stars Hollows citizens to bake the world's largest pizza for her mother's birthday party. Michel and Tobin compete over giving Lorelai the best present, but Richard wins the contest hands-down with a check for $75,000 that is actually the proceeds from an investment he made in Lorelai's name at her birth. Luke confronts Jess about skipping school to work at Walmart, but is blown off as usual. When Lorelai decides to use the money to pay back her parents for Rory's Chilton tuition, Emily becomes furious with Richard for giving Lorelai the money, fearing that the repayment of their loan is a sign that she will never see either Lorelai or Rory again. Luke makes a bad impression on Nicole's parents scaring them off with a rant on the horrors of parenting Jess.
62	19	"Keg! Max!"	Chris Long	Daniel Palladino	April 29, 2003	175019	4.83
On their first free Friday night in years, Lorelai and Rory are at a loss over how to spend the evening, while Emily and Richard cavort at the party they are hosting. Lorelai is appointed Grad Night Treasurer and runs into a playing-it-cool Max at her first Chilton Booster Club meeting. Lane's band gets their first gig at a party and rocks the house, but Dave flips out after discovering Young Chui is in love with Lane. A despondent Lane gets drunk and calls her mother to confess all. When staff cutbacks at the Inn force Lorelai to do turn-down service, she becomes very unsettled at seeing a cozy Luke and Nicole in the room she had offered as thanks for Luke's help with repairs after the fire. Jess is unable to tell Rory that his frequent absences have caused him to flunk out of school and be barred from attending prom. He acts out by pressuring Rory to have sex, upsetting her and triggering a full-blown brawl with Dean after Dean finds a distraught Rory.
63	20	"Say Goodnight, Gracie"	Jamie Babbit	Janet Leahy & Amy Sherman-Palladino	May 6, 2003	175020	5.17
Fran Weston dies and Lorelai and Sookie try to buy the Dragonfly Inn, but must make inquiries during the funeral due to their hectic schedules. Lorelai learns Rory was the source of the fight and admires her for it. Rory and Jess try approaching each other, but fail to talk. Dean tells Rory that he is engaged to Lindsay, to Rory's horror. Mrs. Kim agrees to let Lane go to the prom with Dave after he reads the Bible in one night searching for a quote Mrs. Kim told him. Luke finds out about Jess and Dean's fight at the party and is angered by Jess not taking responsibility for the damage. Jess' father, Jimmy, comes to Stars Hollow and Luke tries to scare him out of town before he can upset Jess. Jimmy and Jess meet, but Jimmy cannot bring himself to say anything leaves abruptly. Jess tells Rory he cannot take her to prom but does not inform her that he is leaving town.
64	21	"Here Comes the Son"	Amy Sherman-Palladino	Amy Sherman-Palladino	May 13, 2003	175021	5.04
Jess heads out to Venice, California, only to learn that his father's community is just as quirky as Stars Hollow. He meets his father's extroverted girlfriend, who lives in a cluttered house with her shy daughter and a pack of dogs. His father hesitates to take Jess in, but changes his mind after Jess confesses he has nowhere else to go. Back in Connecticut, the rift widens between Lorelai and Emily. Luke tells Lorelai that Jess took off for good. Lorelai waits for the right moment to break the news to Rory, who is stressing over finals and graduation. Note: This was to be a backdoor pilot for a spin-off called "Windward Circle", that would focus on Jess living in Venice, California and befriending a group of skateboarders. However, The WB did not pick up the series due to creative disagreements with Amy Sherman Palladino.
65	22	"Those Are Strings, Pinocchio"	Jamie Babbit	Daniel Palladino	May 20, 2003	175022	5.49
Rory learns her mother cannot afford to buy the Dragonfly Inn since financial aid for Yale did not come through. She decides to take matters into her own hands by negotiating with grandparents to borrow money for Yale in exchange for reinstating Friday dinners. They negotiate the terms of the deal with her and are delighted with the outcome. Also, Rory meets Dean and apologizes for her reaction to his engagement: the two make up. Luke has second thoughts about a trip with Nicole after something Lorelai tells him. Rory is named valedictorian of her class and pays homage to her family, especially Lorelai, Emily and Richard, in her graduation speech. Jess calls Rory after her graduation ceremony, but he remains silent and she tells him off for leaving the way he did, declaring everything there was between them over for good. Lorelai and Rory take a moment to appreciate Chilton one last time.

== Filming ==
Scenes at Yale University in episode 8 were actually filmed on the campus of Pomona College.

== DVD release ==
'The Complete Third Season
Set details		Special features		
22 episodes; 6-disc set; 1.33:1 aspect ratio; Subtitles: English, Spanish and French; English (Dolby Digital 2.0 Surround)		Additional scenes; "Swan Song"; "Say Goodnight, Gracie"; "Those Are Strings, Pinocchio"; All Grown Up: a Documentary with the Cast about their Childhood Experiences; Who Wants to Fall in Love: a Montage of the Best "Love Moments" from Season 3; Our Favorite '80s: the Cast and Crew Show off their Favorite '80s Dance Moves; "Guide to Gilmorisms" booklet		
Release dates
North America	United Kingdom	Continental Europe	Norway	Australia
May 3, 2005	July 17, 2006	April 12, 2006	June 28, 2006	July 5, 2006
