= Liz Torres =

American actress, singer, comedian (born 1947)

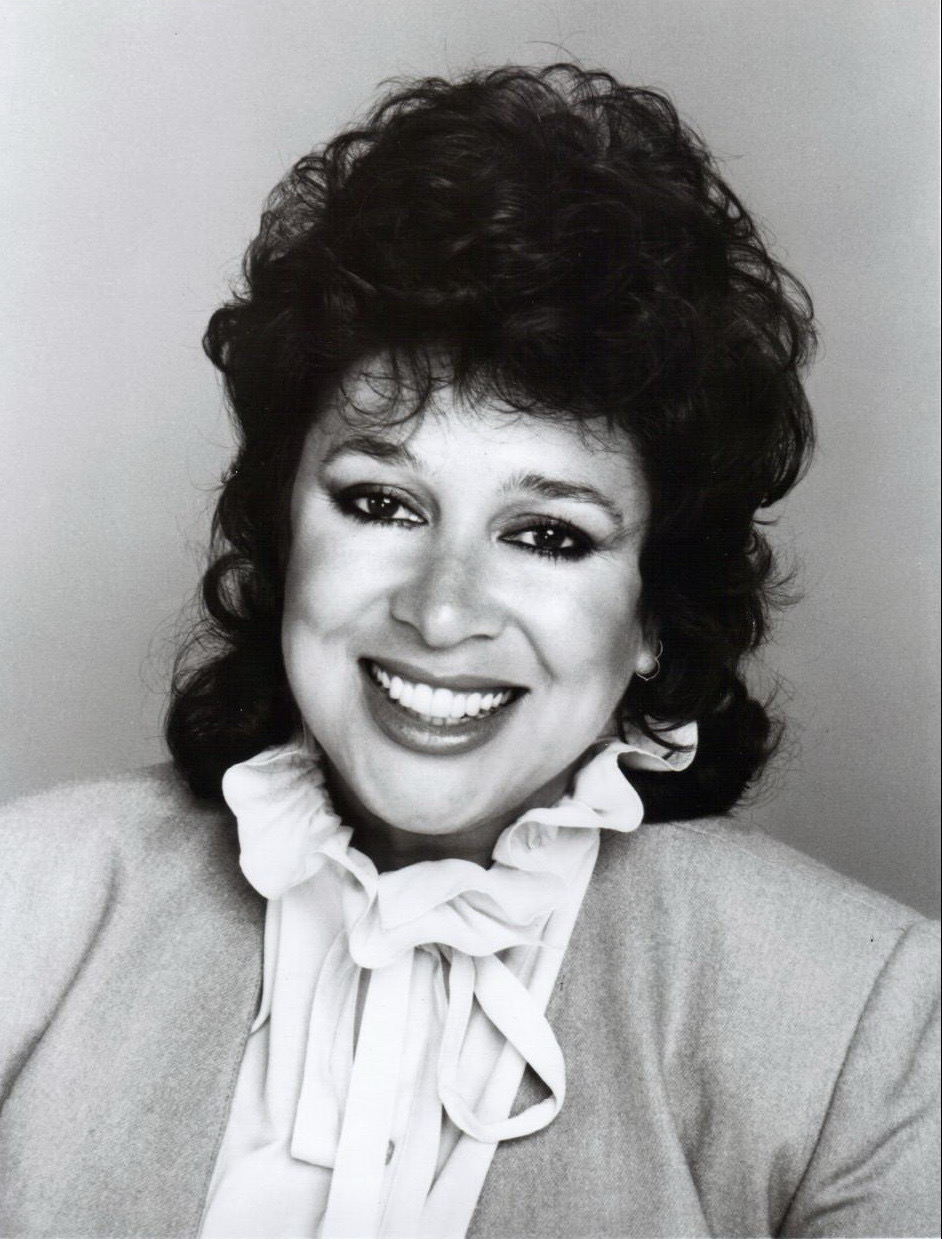
- Torres in 1982
- Born: Elizabeth Larrieu Torres; September 27, 1947 (age 78); The Bronx, New York, U.S.
- Occupations: Actress; singer; comedian
- Years active: 1967–present
- Spouse: Peter Locke (m. 1974; div. 1977)

Elizabeth Larrieu Torres (born September 27, 1947) is an American actress, singer, and comedian. Torres is best known for her role as Mahalia Sanchez in the NBC comedy series The John Larroquette Show (1993–1996), for which she received two Primetime Emmy and Golden Globe Award nominations. She is also known for her role as Patricia "Miss Patty" LaCosta in The WB family comedic drama series Amy Sherman-Palladino's Gilmore Girls (2000–07) starring Lauren Graham and Alexis Bledel. In the 1970s, she played Julie Erskine on Phyllis and also had a recurring role as Teresa Betancourt on All in the Family.

== Career ==
Torres started her career as a comedian and singer working the city's night club circuit with her friend Bette Midler. In 1971, she was spotted doing one of her acts by the producer of Johnny Carson's The Tonight Show who invited her to do a stand-up comedy skit on the show. She made her film debut in 1969 playing a prostitute in a low-budget movie titled Utterly Without Redeeming Social Value.

In 1973, Torres played Morticia in The Addams Family Fun House, which was a musical version of the original series. From 1975 to 1976, she was a regular cast member on the CBS sitcom, Phyllis, Cloris Leachman's spin-off series from The Mary Tyler Moore Show, succeeding the late Barbara Colby in the role of Julie Erskine.

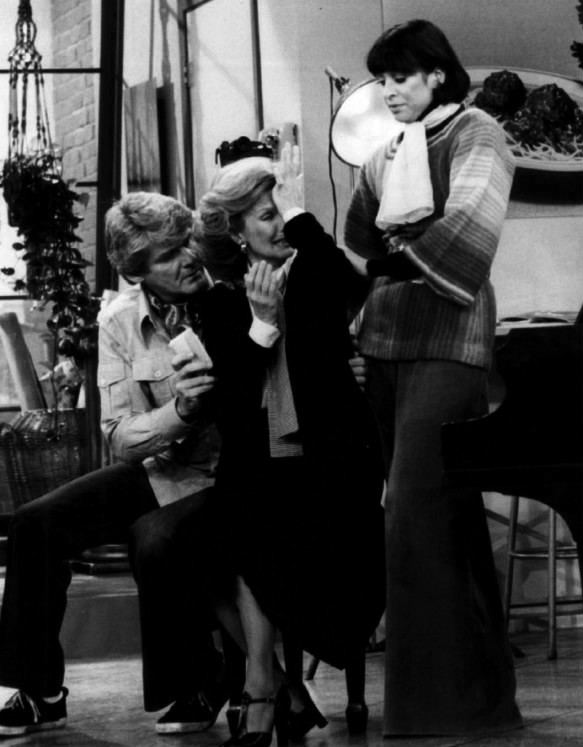
(L–R) Richard Schaal, Cloris Leachman and Liz Torres in Phyllis (1975)

In 1975, she recorded a non-charting novelty disco music single called "Hustle Latino" on RCA Records (RCA 10519) arranged, conducted and produced by Michael Zager and appeared on Dick Clark's American Bandstand to perform the number. In 1976, she played "Cat" in TV's musical special Pinocchio starring Sandy Duncan, as well as a semi-regular panelist on Break the Bank. On November 26, 1976, she played Redd Foxx's ex-maid, when he was roasted on the Dean Martin Celebrity Roast. In early 1981, she co-starred opposite Marla Gibbs in Checking In, a short-lived spin-off of The Jeffersons. She had the recurring role on All in the Family as Teresa Betancourt, a wise-cracking nurse who checked Archie into the hospital when he needed a gallbladder operation and then became a boarder at the Bunker house. She also guest starred on Starsky & Hutch, Love, American Style, Hill Street Blues, L.A. Law, Knots Landing, Mama's Family, Tracey Takes On..., Ally McBeal, The Nanny, and Happily Ever After: Fairy Tales for Every Child.

In 1990, Torres was nominated for a Primetime Emmy Award for Outstanding Guest Actress in a Comedy Series for her performance on The Famous Teddy Z. In theater, she has appeared in The Ritz as Googie Gomez, Man of La Mancha as Aldonza, The House of Blue Leaves as Bunny, and A Million To Juan in 1994 as Mrs. Delgado. After a guest starring appearance as a deceased singer-turned-angel on the Donald P. Bellisario drama series Quantum Leap, Torres had a recurring role on another Bellisario show, Tequila and Bonetti, as a psychic who hears the dog Tequila's thoughts.

From 1993 to 1996, she starred as Mahalia Sanchez in the NBC sitcom The John Larroquette Show. For her role, she received two Primetime Emmy Award for Outstanding Supporting Actress in a Comedy Series and Golden Globe Award nominations. Torres received two nominations for the American Comedy Award for Funniest Supporting Female Performer in a TV Series.

In 1997, Torres co-starred alongside Annie Potts in the short-lived ABC sitcom, Over the Top. She later co-starred on First Monday and American Family. From 2000 until the series' end in 2007, she was a semi-regular cast member of Gilmore Girls, on which she played Stars Hollow's resident dance teacher, Patty LaCosta. In 2008, she played the role of Juanita in the Polish film Expecting Love.

Torres later guest starred in Ugly Betty, Desperate Housewives, Private Practice, Scandal, One Day at a Time, and Devious Maids.

== Personal life ==
Torres was born in the borough of The Bronx in New York City, where her parents had settled after moving from Puerto Rico. There she received her primary and secondary education. Her father, Santos Torres Graci, was the co-owner of Club Deportivo de Ponce.

Torres resides in Los Angeles, where she is a member of the board of directors of Write Act Repertory. She was married to movie producer and founder of The Kushner-Locke Company, Peter Locke, who briefly managed her; they divorced in 1977.

== See also ==
- List of Puerto Ricans
