= Lorelai Gilmore =

- Gilmore Girls character
- Lorelai Gilmore, portrayed by actress Lauren Graham.
- First appearance: "Pilot" (Gilmore Girls)
- Last appearance: "Fall" (Gilmore Girls: A Year in the Life)
- Created by: Amy Sherman-Palladino
- Portrayed by: Lauren Graham
- Born: April 25, 1968

In-universe information
- Full name: Lorelai Victoria Gilmore
- Nickname: Lor (by Christopher)
- Gender: Female
- Occupation: Inn owner Hotel manager (previous)
- Family: Richard Gilmore (father); Emily Gilmore (mother); Liz Danes (sister-in law); April Nardini (step-daughter); Rory's Baby (unborn grandchild); Lorelai "Trix" Gilmore (paternal grandmother); Charles Gilmore (paternal grandfather)
- Significant other: Luke Danes (husband) Christopher Hayden (ex-husband) Max Medina (ex-fiancé)
- Children: Rory Gilmore (daughter)
- Home: Stars Hollow, Connecticut

Lorelai Victoria Gilmore is a fictional character in The WB series Gilmore Girls. Created by Amy Sherman-Palladino and portrayed by actress Lauren Graham, she appeared in every episode of the show from 2000 to 2007.

Lorelai is introduced as a young single mother of a teenage daughter, Rory. Lorelai has a strained relationship with her wealthy parents, Richard and Emily, after running away as a teen to raise her daughter alone. Lorelai remains estranged from her parents for many years until the events of the pilot episode, where she asks her parents for help paying Rory's tuition. Her parents agree, on the condition that she visits them for dinner every Friday.

Besides an on-again, off-again relationship with Rory's father, Christopher Hayden, Lorelai has romantic relationships that include Max Medina, a teacher at Rory's high school, Chilton, to whom she was briefly engaged; Alex Lesman, an outdoorsy coffee house entrepreneur; Jason Stiles, a childhood acquaintance; and Luke Danes, the owner of Luke's Diner in her adopted hometown of Stars Hollow, Connecticut. As Lorelai frequents Luke's Diner, they became close friends and eventually fall in love. In the Netflix revival miniseries A Year in the Life, Luke and Lorelai marry.

Graham received widespread critical acclaim for portraying her character and was nominated for several awards. She won two Teen Choice Awards for Choice TV Parental Unit in 2005 and 2006. Lorelai has frequently been mentioned as one of the greatest and most iconic television characters ever created.

== Arc ==
=== Background ===
Lorelai Victoria Gilmore was born to Richard and Emily Gilmore on April 25, 1968. Named after her paternal grandmother, Lorelai Gilmore was raised in Hartford, Connecticut by her wealthy parents who wanted her to be a proper young lady of high society, go to an Ivy League college, and marry a man with wealth and status. Her early life was complicated her life growing up was due to an by the high expectations of an overbearing neurotic mother and a workaholic father; both only daughter expected Lorelai to live in their world of wealth and aspirations of their world of privilege. Lorelai is a highly talkative, free- spirited Woman, a child of the eighties and part of the MTV generation. Her parents had her future all planned out and arranged for her to come out to society after her sixteenth birthday, but Lorelai was always rebellious and resentful of her structured, sheltered and silver spoon upbringing. She became pregnant with Christopher Hayden and left home shortly after Rory's birth, to create her own, independent life suited to her personality and wishes In her youth she attended private school, cotillions, and was a member of her school's homecoming court. Lorelai became pregnant as a teenager with her boyfriend Christopher's baby. Her parents discovered her pregnancy during a fitting for her debutante dress. This caused great embarrassment and disappointment her parents and Christopher's parents, Straub and Francine Hayden. Straub Hayden initially suggested that Lorelai have an abortion; however, Emily would not allow this, and Richard suggested that Lorelai and Christopher should marry instead. Christopher agreed with Richard, but Lorelai refused, convinced that marrying so young simply wouldn't work out. When Lorelai realized she was in labor, she left a note for her parents and drove alone to the hospital. After giving birth to her daughter, Rory, on October 8, 1984, at the age of 16, Lorelai briefly continued to live with her parents at their mansion in Hartford. She eventually ran away with Rory to Stars Hollow, a small fictional town in rural Connecticut, in search of independence. The owner of the local Independence Inn, Mia, gave Lorelai a job as a maid and let her and Rory live in the back in a renovated potting shed. While working at the Independence Inn, Lorelai met her best friend, Sookie St. James, the executive chef at the Inn. Lorelai worked her way up over the years and was eventually promoted to executive management. Lorelai had nearly no contact with her parents for many years after running away from home, except for visits during major holidays.

=== Storylines ===
When the series starts, Rory Gilmore gets accepted into Chilton Preparatory School, an expensive private high school. Lorelai asks Emily and Richard to pay for Rory's attendance fees, and they agree to loan the money. In exchange for paying for Rory's tuition at Chilton, Emily and Richard instate mandatory "Friday night dinners", to which Lorelai reluctantly agrees, allowing them to get to know their granddaughter. Lorelai meets Rory's teacher Max Medina at Rory's first parent-teacher meeting at Chilton. They both become interested in one another and soon start seeing each other. When Lorelai wants to split, as it becomes too serious, she kisses Max in Chilton, provoking a scandal in the school and ending their relationship. While they are separate, Lorelai has a one-night stand with Christopher after a heated argument with her parents. Christopher proposes to her, but she rejects him, telling him he is not ready to care for Rory and her. Lorelai later rekindles her relationship with Max, and they become engaged. As their wedding is approaching, Lorelai has second thoughts and calls Christopher during her bachelorette party. Suddenly, Lorelai calls off the wedding and decides to go on a road trip with Rory, during which they visit Harvard University.

Christopher comes back to town for Rory's debutante ball. During the evening, Lorelai and Christopher kiss, and she finds him changed, but he tells her he is now in a serious relationship with a woman named Sherry. Afterward, Lorelai and Sookie plan to open their inn, but the building they want, Fran Weston's inn, 'the Dragonfly', is not for sale. When Luke Danes' nephew Jess Mariano and Rory get into a car accident, Lorelai blames Jess, which leads to a serious argument between Luke and Lorelai. They reconcile only months later. Christopher returns to Stars Hollow, and after he tells Lorelai he has problems in his relationship with Sherry, they spend the night together before Sookie's wedding. They are both now ready to commit, but when Christopher learns Sherry is pregnant, he leaves Lorelai and returns to Sherry. In the third season, Lorelai meets Alex Lesman at a lecture about inns, and they begin dating. While she is on her way to the Friday night dinner, Lorelai comes across Max, and they catch up. They again run into each other at Chilton's bicentennial and share a kiss. After several days, the two meet at a Chilton parent committee evening, and Max makes it clear he does not want them to reunite. On Lorelai's birthday, Richard gives her a payout from an investment he had made at her birth; however, she decides to repay her parents for the loan, which shocks Emily. Fran dies, allowing Lorelai and Sookie to buy the Dragonfly. The Independence Inn closes, and Lorelai plans on using the money aimed at the Dragonfly to pay for Yale University's fees; however, Rory refuses to let her pay for Yale and instead asks her grandparents for their financial help, reinstating the Friday night dinners in return. This then allows Lorelai and Sookie to buy the Dragonfly on Rory's graduation day.

In the fourth season, Luke marries lawyer Nicole on a cruise, but they soon divorce, and Lorelai and Sookie begin the renovations of the inn. Richard forms a new partnership with his former associate's son, Jason Stiles, who happens to be an old summer camp friend of Lorelai's. After he disagrees with Emily about Richard's new business launch party, Lorelai, furious, goes to talk to him, and at the end of their discussion, he invites her to dinner, but she refuses. Later, Jason succeeds in getting Emily's invitation to a Friday night dinner, and he and Lorelai get closer. She eventually accepts his invitation to dinner, and they start seeing each other without telling her parents. As she is running out of money to renovate the inn, Lorelai asks for Luke's help, who offers her a loan. When Emily organizes a dinner with Jason's parents, Jason's father, Floyd, announces he will sue his son and Richard because they have taken his clients. Floyd also tells Lorelai's parents about her relationship with his son, which shocks Emily. In the fallout of Floyd's announcement, Richard decides to associate with Floyd, jeopardizing Jason's career. When the former tells her he will sue her father, Lorelai breaks up with him. Luke, whose marriage to lawyer Nicole failed, finally realizes the woman he truly loves is Lorelai. She serves as a date for his sister's wedding and sees him in a new light. At the end of the evening, he tells her they should spend more time together. Lorelai and Sookie open their inn, and after a misunderstanding about Jason, Luke and Lorelai finally kiss for the first time.

In the fifth season, Lorelai embarks on a relationship with Luke after discovering Rory has lost her virginity to married Dean, her first love and former boyfriend. Dean had married another girl after breaking up with Rory. This entanglement with a married man strains Rory and Lorelai's mother-daughter relationship. Eventually, Rory apologizes. Christopher panicked over Sherrie's departure to Paris, leaving him alone with their baby, and calls Lorelai for help. Rory later tells Christopher to leave her mother alone because she's happy with Luke. After no news following her visit to his house, she invites Christopher to the inn with Rory and notices the tension between them. Luke also worries when he learns about the dinner. When Christopher's father dies, Lorelai and Rory go to his house to support him. However, Lorelai does not mention her visit to Luke. Emily tells Christopher that the relationship between Lorelai and Luke is getting serious and that he should do something if he wants to end up with Lorelai. At Richard and Emily's wedding renewal ceremony, Lorelai finally admits to Luke her visit to Christopher when she notices his presence. Christopher tells Luke that his relationship with Lorelai won't last because he is destined to be with Lorelai. This leads to Luke breaking up with Lorelai, but they later reunite. Lorelai, however, remains furious at Emily for some time but eventually forgives her. Lorelai is worried about Rory's relationship with Logan Huntzberger and his family's influence on her. At the conclusion of the season, they steal a yacht and end up at the police station. Rory decides to take a year off from Yale, which upsets Lorelai, and when her parents, who initially agreed to help her, change their minds and permit Rory to move in with them, Lorelai decides to propose to Luke.

In the sixth season, Lorelai and Rory do not talk for months, but Luke agrees to marry Lorelai, and they renovate her house. When Luke reveals that he cannot trust Lorelai after she receives a message from Christopher, the two fight. Lorelai and Rory finally reconcile, and she decides to return to Yale. Luke learns he has a daughter but does not tell Lorelai. Lorelai later finds out about Luke's daughter, and they postpone the wedding. When Christopher receives an inheritance, he starts to pay for Yale, and Friday night dinners are no longer mandatory. Luke begins to form a relationship with his daughter but insists that Lorelai stay out of it. After posing an ultimatum to Luke, which leads to their break-up, Lorelai sleeps with Christopher, and they start dating again.

In the final season of the original series, Lorelai and Christopher jet off to Paris, where they impulsively get married. When Lorelai returns home and informs Rory and the rest of Stars Hollow, including Luke, that she and Christopher are married, she gets mixed reactions. Rory is upset at first but comes around since all she really wants is for her mom (and, for that matter, her dad) to be happy. Throughout the season, Christopher and Lorelai face some significant problems; the biggest one is when Lorelai needs to write a character reference for Luke so he can get partial custody of his daughter, April. Christopher finds a draft of the letter, and when reading it, he realizes that Lorelai still loves Luke. Lorelai tries to deny it but soon realizes they're better off as friends. In the end, Lorelai reunites with Luke. She realizes how much she loves Luke when she finds out that he was the one who planned Rory's goodbye party for the entire town. Lorelai realizes that Luke has been there for her from the beginning, and he loves her and her daughter. In one of the show's final scenes, Lorelai and Luke share a passionate kiss and get back together, finally ready to settle into a stable relationship.

In the Netflix revival miniseries, A Year in the Life, Lorelai and Luke have built a life together. They are living together in her home; he still runs the diner, and she still owns her inn, but they have not married. Throughout the four episodes, Lorelai goes through a lot, especially with her relationship with her mother. Lorelai and Emily have always had a strained relationship, yet it has gotten better over the years. In the revival, the two go to family therapy. Lorelai also goes on her own version of "Wild," where she tries to find herself. When she returns, she realizes her life is with Luke in Stars Hollow and is happy. The show ends with Lorelai and Luke's wedding at dawn in the center of Stars Hollow, where some of her closest friends, Michel, Lane, Kirk, and Rory, are present.

In the very last scene of the show, Lorelai sits with Rory as they reflect on "it all". Suddenly, Rory turns to her mother and tells her she is pregnant.

== Character development ==
=== Casting ===
"She had to have everything. The role required someone who could act, who could make you cry, who could break your heart, who was funny and gorgeous and tough and sexy and vulnerable. We looked and looked and couldn't find that actress. Just about the time I was saying, 'Let's just find somebody who's pretty and put her in the corner,' in walks Lauren. She gave us everything we wanted - a lovely little gift combo."

— Sherman-Palladino on Graham's casting

Three other actresses, including Nina Garbiras, were initially considered to play Lorelai, but the network rejected them and instead mentioned the name of Lauren Graham. Before landing the role of Lorelai in Gilmore Girls, Graham starred in many short-lived TV shows, guest appeared in a number of top 10 prime-time comedies and did commercial work.

She obtained the role in Gilmore Girls because she had all the characteristics producer Amy Sherman-Palladino was looking for. "The fact that you had someone that talented running around Hollywood, not found yet, was the biggest coup in the world", she said "Because Lorelai's a hard part. You've got to be funny, you've got to talk really fast, you've got to be able to act, you've got to be sexy, but not scary sexy. You've got to be strong, but not like 'I hate men.' It's a lot that goes into this character, and it was really a tough find. And to find it and be able to feel like you broke somebody fresh, even though everybody in town knew Lauren, like everybody here was like, 'When is Lauren going to get something great.' But America didn't know Lauren, and that was a real coup for us."

=== Characterization ===
Virginia Heffernan of The New York Times described Lorelai and Rory as "unsentimental brainiacs" who, if they could see Gilmore Girls, would hate its sentimentality of the last and final season. She talks fast and uses words to keep her "loneliness at bay" which, while opinion, seems to be a relatively insightful view of her. Lorelai feels that to "swoon, even once," would make her lose her verbal power and her "reason for being." On the characteristic of talking fast, Sherman-Palladino noted: "Just by listening to Lorelai's vocal patterns, it says volumes about this woman: First of all, that she's bright enough to put that many words together that quickly... and it says a lot about her emotionally, that she's got a deflection shield that's sort of the way she gets through the world, which says survivor." She also said of the character: "Lorelai's humor was her guard and her deflection and what kept her strong. It was her Wonder Woman cuffs."

Margaret Lyons of Vulture.com wrote an analysis on Lorelai pointing out her flaws: "Both Gilmores have an exaggerated sense of their own wonderfulness, though I suppose, in their defense, those around them seem to play along. [...] Lorelai's downfall is her intense, overwhelming self-absorption. She's chronically rude to people in the service industry, and she is always in the market for special treatment. She is not a good friend to Sookie, even though she thinks she is; she kinda, sorta takes advantage of Sookie's pleaser tendencies and frequently ignores, minimizes, or dismisses Sookie's ideas and problems. Her self-absorption erodes any opportunity for self-awareness. She likes to refer to her "emotional baggage," but she assiduously avoids doing anything about it. Lorelai knows how to push Emily and Richard's buttons, and she never hesitates to do so."

In the fifth season, Lorelai started a relationship with Luke Danes; Sherman-Palladino commented: "I thought we had enough time invested in the relationship that people would care. We had a good four years, and in those four years, we saw Luke go through relationships, and we saw Lorelai go through three relationships. I felt like it was time."

== Reception ==
E! Online's Lia Harberman summarized Lorelai as "a woman we’re dying to call Mom. [...] Finally, the ultratalented actress gets a chance to shine in a show that looks like it just might stick around." Willa Paskin of PopMatters wrote Lorelai is "perhaps the most fully developed female character on television." The New York Times TV columnist Virginia Heffernan said the character was "painful and surprising and exciting to watch — a marvelous high-wire act." According to Michael Ausiello, fans were reluctant to let Luke and Lorelai go.

In 2005, in honor of Mother's Day, Inside TV, a newly-published weekly magazine for television fans, chose its picks for Top 10 All-Time Greatest TV Moms. Gilmore Girls Lorelai Gilmore ranked 5th ahead of classic television mothers Marion Cunningham of Happy Days, Caroline Ingalls from Little House on the Prairie and Carol Brady. of The Brady Bunch. On May 11, 2008, TiVo released the results of a survey conducted by eRewards Market Research on Television's Top Moms. Lorelai ranked 14th, with 20 percent of respondents selecting her among their top 20 TV moms. In the 1000th issue of Entertainment Weekly, Lorelai Gilmore was selected as the Mom for The Perfect TV Family. In 2009, she was voted the "Best Mom" in Zap2it's first poll of the best television characters in the 2000s. She was listed in the Top 5 Modern TV Moms by Film.com. In February 2012, Zap2it held a poll to determine TV's Most Crushworthy. Lorelai was elected TV's Most Crushworthy Mom over Gloria Delgado-Pritchett of Modern Family. In May 2012, Lorelai was one of the 13 moms chosen by users of iVillage on their list of "Mommy Dearest: The TV Moms You Love". Lauren Graham was selected twice for her portrayal of Lorelai by the Teen Choice Awards, winning "Choice TV Parental Unit" in 2005 and 2006.

In June 2010, Lorelai was named one of the 100 Greatest Characters of the Last 20 Years along with her daughter Rory by Entertainment Weekly. She was also listed in AfterEllen.com's Top 50 Favorite Female TV Characters. AOL TV ranked her the 57th Most Memorable Female TV Character. Lorelai and Rory were listed in Paste's 35 Greatest TV Duos of All Time. Her relationship with Luke was included in TV Guide's list of the best TV couples of all time. They were also part of Entertainment Weekly's "30 Best 'Will They/Won't They?' TV Couples". AOL TV placed their kisses among the "10 Best Smooches in Television". For her portrayal of Lorelai, Graham received a nomination for the award of Best Actress in a Drama Series at the 2002 Golden Globe Awards, but lost to Jennifer Garner from Alias. She was also nominated for the Screen Actors Guild Award for Outstanding Performance by a Female Actor in a Drama Series in 2000 and in 2001. Several critics felt Graham's performance deserved an Emmy Award nomination; however, she never received any, leading Megan Friedman of Time magazine to list her in her "Top 10 Emmy Snubs".
