= Steven Sclaroff =

American interior designer

- Born: 1964 or 1965 (age 60–61)
- Education: Carnegie Mellon
- Occupation: Interior designer
- Years active: 1994–present
- Website: StevenSclaroff.com

Steven Sclaroff (born 1964 or 1965) is an American interior designer known for his residential and commercial interiors that blend vintage and contemporary elements. He has designed spaces for clients including Donna Karan, Tony Kushner, and Kate Spade, and his work has appeared in such publications as The New York Times and Elle Decor.

== Early life and education ==
Sclaroff began working in an antiques shop at age 12, and by 16 was selling modern and Arts and Crafts furniture to dealers at flea markets.

He studied architecture at Carnegie Mellon University.

== Career ==
In 1994, he joined Aero Studios, where he contributed to the design of Giorgio Armani's New York apartment, the Soho Grand Hotel, 60 Thompson, and the Hard Rock Hotel and Casino.

In 1999, Sclaroff founded his eponymous design firm, and opened a retail store in 2001, initially located on Greenwich Street. The store later relocated to White Street in 2007.

=== Notable projects ===
His residential clients include Kate and Andy Spade, for whom he designed an Upper East Side apartment and a home in Southampton. Other clients include Edward Klein, Tony Kushner, Jason Pomeranc, and Honey Dijon. His commercial clients include Donna Karan, Kate Spade New York Jack Spade, Quiksilver, and 6 Columbus, a Thompson Hotel property. Sclaroff has designed products for Nanz Custom Hardware, Remains Lighting, and Waterworks.

=== Writing ===
As a writer, Sclaroff has contributed articles to Metropolitan Home, New York magazine, and The New York Times.

== Design philosophy ==
Sclaroff often layers vintage furnishings with contemporary pieces, gravitating toward unusual or overlooked designs rather than well-known icons. "I have a fair amount of midcentury [...] But I stay away from the stuff you see a lot. It's more fun to have stuff be less familiar. It's fresher."

Although his work is sometimes described as eclectic, Sclaroff has rejected the label, suggesting it implies randomness rather than rigor. He often introduces unexpected, surreal elements to break visual monotony and reflect the client's personality. "For people who collect modern art and design, an odd piece of furniture can help break things up and express their personality."

== Distinctions ==
- 2000: Named among the "new guard" of interior design by Rima Suqi of The New York Times
- 2002: Top 100 architects and designers in New York by New York magazine
- 2004: Top 100 architects and designers in New York by Gotham
- 2011: The World of Interiors named the green bedroom designed for Kate and Andy Spade as one of the "most outstanding" in the magazine's history
