= Elyce Arons =

American fashion executive

- Occupations: Entrepreneur and Fashion Executive
- Known for: Co-founder of Kate Spade and Frances Valentine

Elyce Arons is an American entrepreneur, fashion executive, and co-founder of the brands Kate Spade New York and Frances Valentine. She is currently chief executive officer (CEO) of Frances Valentine.

== Early life ==
Elyce Arons grew up on a farm in Sedgwick, Kansas, just 25 miles outside of Wichita. She is the youngest of four daughters, raised by her parents, Dana and Lou Cox. The farm had been in her family for generations, where they raised Angus cattle and a variety of crops.

She was introduced to New York and the world of fashion by her mother and sisters growing up. Her mother was an entrepreneur and a graphic designer. She worked as an illustrator for fashion companies and retailers in Wichita. She also used these talents to make costumes for her daughters and their community theater. Following another passion, she opened up her own restaurant, The Inn at Sedgwick, out of their family's farmhouse when her daughters were older. Arons visited New York frequently, where her older sister Willow had moved at 17 years old to dance at the Joffrey Ballet School.

== Education ==
After graduating from Newton High School, Arons started at the University of Kansas (KU) in the fall of 1981. She spent two years at KU, where she was a journalism major and a member of the Chi Omega sorority.

During her college tenure, Arons met Kate Spade (who was then Kate Brosnahan). The two shared interests in vintage fashion and Mary Tyler Moore, which they have credited as the reason to become journalism majors and future businesswomen. Brosnahan and Arons later became business partners.

The pair then transferred to Arizona State University (ASU) to finish their degrees. At ASU, they met Andy Spade, their future business partner and Kate's future spouse. Arons graduated from Arizona State University's Walter Cronkite School of Journalism in 1986 with a bachelor's degree in journalism.

== Career ==
Arons moved to New York immediately after graduating, where she started working as a PR assistant at J.G. Hook, a preppy American fashion brand. From there, she moved on to work in communication for the French fashion brand Girbaud Jeans. Seven years after she started in New York, Kate and Andy Spade reached out about partnering on a handbag company.

=== Kate Spade New York ===
In 1993, Elyce Arons, alongside Kate Spade, Andy Spade, and Pamela Bell, founded the fashion label Kate Spade. The brand started out with six handbags, since Spade had identified a gap in the American market for mid-level bags. The options available were high-end European designs with expensive hardware or more simple, casual bags, like the L.L Bean canvas tote. The label grew over the next thirteen years to become a lifestyle brand selling jewelry, clothes, and shoes in addition to the original handbags.

The four original founders sold the company completely to Neiman Marcus in a two part deal between 1999 and 2006. In 1999, 56% of the brand was sold to Neiman Marcus and the remainder in 2006. Arons, and the other founders eventually moved on from the brand in 2007.

Arons spent the next ten years away from the fashion industry with her family.

=== Frances Valentine ===
In 2016, Arons came back to fashion alongside close friend Kate Spade and her husband Andy Spade to found their second fashion label, Francis Valentine. The brand began as a line of shoes and handbags to exhibit the style of Arons and Spade, as it had evolved over the years since Kate Spade New York. They have grown over the last decade to include clothes and accessories in their catalog.

Following the death of her partner in June 2018, Arons assumed the role of CEO of Frances Valentine.

In 2025, she published the memoir We Might Just Make It After All: My Best Friendship with Kate Spade. She was named 2025 Kansan of the Year by the Kansas Society of Washington, D.C.

== Personal life ==
Arons is married to Andy Arons, co-founder of Gourmet Garage, a New York City based specialty grocery chain. The couple lives in New York City and have three daughters.
