= Matthew Curry =

American singer-songwriter

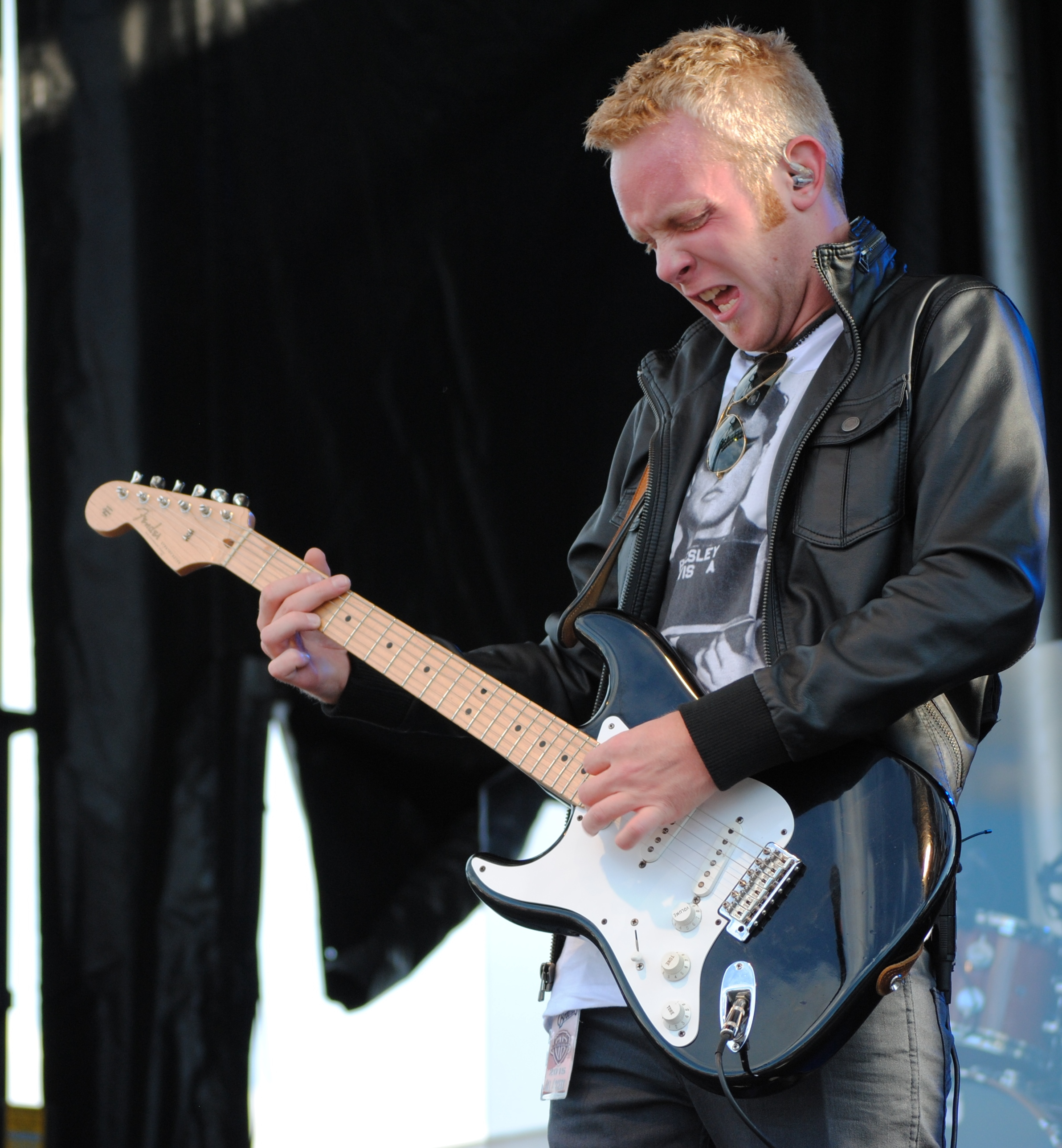
- Matthew Curry in Buford, GA (2015)

Background information
- Born: Matthew Curry; May 23, 1995 (age 30); Peoria, Illinois, United States
- Origin: Bloomington, Illinois
- Genres: Rock
- Occupations: Singer-songwriter, guitarist
- Years active: 2005–present
- Labels: Ruf Records
- Website: matthewcurry.com

Matthew Curry is an American rock and roots musician from Bloomington, Illinois, United States. Curry originally began playing guitar at the age of 4 with the encouragement of his father. Naturally born a left-hander; Curry's first guitar, described by Matthew as a "cheap-o Walmart guitar," was a right-handed model that he flipped upside down. Today, he typically plays a left-handed Eric Clapton Signature Fender Stratocaster. Mostly self-taught, Curry learned to play by playing along to music by artists like ZZ Top and Stevie Ray Vaughan.

== Touring ==
Signed to the Paradigm Talent Agency in 2013, Curry is a consistent national touring artist; support has included dates in support of Peter Frampton, The Steve Miller Band, The Doobie Brothers, and Blackberry Smoke.

In 2015 Curry performed a number of music festivals including, The Beale Street Music Festival, Wakarusa Music and Camping Festival, and the Summer Camp Music Festival. In April 2014 Curry made his Australian debut with a performance on the Byron Bay Bluesfest in New South Wales, Australia.

In August 2015 Curry was featured by Fender Guitars as a participating artist on the Fender Accelerator Tour. As part of the tour, Fender provided guitars, gear, and promotional tools to emerging artists. Featured artists included The Bots, Coasts (band), Deap Vally, Josh Dorr, Night Terrors of 1927, Priory (band), Marmozets, Real Estate (band), Striking Matches, and Waters (band).

Curry has frequently participated in impromptu jam sessions and blues renditions with past touring headliners including Peter Frampton, The Steve Miller Band, and The Doobie Brothers.

Peter Frampton describes Matthew Curry, "...someone asked me in an interview today if I thought there could be anymore guitar heroes. Well, hell yes of course and Matthew is one who will prove that to be true."

Steve Miller of The Steve Miller Band has described Curry as a, "...wonderful guitar player [and] great songwriter in the Stevie Ray Vaughan area of virtuosity and originality."

Matthew Curry's touring band is: Tim Brickner (bass and backing vocals), Mike Nellas (guitar and backing vocals) and Francis Valentino (drums)

== In the media ==
Curry made his feature film debut with a speaking role, portraying the late Ronnie Van Zant of Lynyrd Skynyrd, in Joe Dirt 2: Beautiful Loser starring David Spade and directed by Fred Wolf. The film was debuted by Crackle on July 16, 2015.

== Discography ==
=== If I Don't Got You (2014) ===
Track list:

1. "If I Don't Got You"
2. "New York Blues"
3. "Storm's A-Brewing"
4. "Walk Out That Door"
5. "Hear the Highway"
6. "Blinded by the Darkness"
7. "Dancing to the Blues"
8. "High Water Everywhere"
9. "Soulshine"

=== Electric Religion (2015) ===
Track list:

1. "Love Me Right"
2. "Set Me Free"
3. "Six String Broken Heart"
4. "Put One Over"
5. "Hundred Dollar Friend"
6. "JMH"
7. "Genevieve"
8. "Bad Bad Day"
9. "Down The Line"
10. "Louanna"

=== Shine On (2016) ===
Track list:

1. "Blink of an Eye"
2. "Caroline"
3. "Shine On"
4. "Electric Religion"
5. "Matter of Time"
6. "Draw the Line"

=== Open Road (2019) ===
Track list:

1. "Open Road"
2. "One More Wrong Night"
3. "The Great Midwest"
4. "Working it Out"
5. "On My Way"
6. "Monday Rain"
7. "Singing Right Along"
8. "Illusion of Hope"
9. "I Think of You"
