= Jason Polan =

American artist (1982–2020)

- Born: Jason Daniel Polan; July 17, 1982; Ann Arbor, Michigan, U.S.
- Died: January 27, 2020 (aged 37); New York City, U.S.
- Education: University of Michigan
- Occupation: Artist
- Known for: Every Person in New York

Jason Daniel Polan (July 17, 1982 – January 27, 2020) was an American artist based in New York City. He was best known for his project Every Person in New York, in which he attempted to draw every individual in the city. By the time of his death at age 37, he had completed more than 50,000 portraits.

== Early life and education ==
Polan was born in Ann Arbor, Michigan. He studied both anthropology and art and design at the University of Michigan, graduating in 2004. While in Ann Arbor, he painted the "Ant Alley" mural on Maynard Street. After graduating, he moved to New York City, where he lived for the rest of his life.

== Artistic career ==
Polan's work appeared in numerous publications, including The New Yorker, The New York Times, Los Angeles Times, Believer, Apartamento, Metropolis, Lucky Peach, and McSweeney's Quarterly Concern. He collaborated with institutions and companies such as Warby Parker, Uniqlo, The Criterion Collection, Levi's, Russ & Daughters, Partners & Spade, the Whitney Museum, the Brooklyn Museum, and the Ford Foundation.

He created more than 100 artist books and zines, dozens of which are held in the Museum of Modern Art's library collection.

In 2005, he founded the Taco Bell Drawing Club, a weekly gathering at the Union Square Taco Bell in New York City where artists and enthusiasts met to draw. Explaining the club in The New Yorker, he said: "There are no rules. I often draw people, but you can draw whatever you want."

In 2019, he created the variant cover for Marvel's The Amazing Spider-Man #20. In 2025, The Post Office, a volume compiling Polan's preserved letters, artist correspondence, cards, and other ephemera, edited by Jason Fulford, was published by Printed Matter, Inc.

== Every Person in New York ==
Launched in March 2008, Every Person in New York was Polan's most ambitious project. He aimed to sketch every person in the city, often drawing in public spaces such as subway stations, museums, and street corners. In 2015, the project was published as a book, and by his death in 2020, he had completed more than 50,000 portraits.

A second volume, edited by Hans Seeger, was published posthumously in 2021. Writing about the book in The New York Times, Sadie Stein observed:

Despite the quixotic scale of his work, Mr. Polan's vision of New York wasn't grandiose or especially nostalgic. He drew whoever caught his eye, and that didn't depend on whether his subjects said "in" or "on" line, or if they ate their pizza with a fork. They were just people who happened to be in this particular place. (Crucially, he didn't insist that people be "New Yorkers." He allowed each person to be of this city, at least for a moment.) Most of his subjects were anonymous, but their anonymity wasn't some step on the way to being discovered or transformed by attention. When practiced responsibly, anonymity is one of the primary pleasures of city living.

== Death and legacy ==
Polan died of colon cancer on January 27, 2020, in New York City, at the age of 37. His death prompted tributes from the art community. In New York magazine, critic Jerry Saltz called him "one of the consummate draftsmen of the 21st century." Former New York Times art director Steven Heller wrote: "He was very sensitive to the human drama unfolding all around him. In the most simple, economic way, he would record what he saw, and there is a joyfulness in what he made. The act of looking would take over the act of drawing, so his line can be kind of jumpy and disjointed, and this became his signature style. These were real life moments, things that go unnoticed by many — it could be a very tender moment of a dad with his son, or someone sleeping on a subway, or someone eating in a diner." Writing on MoMA's website, senior curator Paola Antonelli described him as a "municipal treasure", noting: "There is nothing New Yorkers are more proud of than other New Yorkers, and those among us that devote their life to chronicling their fellow citizens in the city's trenches are elevated to the role of municipal treasures. Jason was one."
