= The Pleasure of Being Robbed =

- Theatrical release poster
- Directed by: Josh Safdie
- Screenplay by: Josh Safdie; Eleonore Hendricks
- Story by: Josh Safdie; Andy Spade; Anthony Sperduti
- Produced by: Brett Jutkiewicz; Sam Lisenco; Zach Treitz; Josh Safdie
- Starring: Eleonore Hendricks; Josh Safdie; Jordan Zaldez; Wayne Chin; Francesca LaPrelle
- Cinematography: Brett Jutkiewicz
- Edited by: Brett Jutkiewicz; Josh Safdie; Benny Safdie
- Production company: Red Bucket Films
- Distributed by: IFC Films
- Release dates: March 10, 2008 (SXSW); October 3, 2008 (United States)
- Running time: 71 minutes
- Country: United States
- Language: English

The Pleasure of Being Robbed is a 2008 American drama film produced, edited and directed by Josh Safdie (in his feature film directorial debut) from a script he wrote with Eleonore Hendricks. It stars Hendricks, Safdie, Jordan Zaldez, Wayne Chin, and Francesca LaPrelle. It tells the story of a kleptomaniac woman who lives in New York City. The film had its world premiere in the Emerging Visions section at the 2008 South by Southwest on March 10, 2008. It was released in the United States in limited theaters on October 3, 2008.

== Plot ==
Eleonore is a lonely, free-spirited kleptomaniac woman who lives in New York City. She frequently steals others' possessions, mainly handbags and purses. While in a bar, she picks up a woman's bag and finds car keys. She bumps into her friend Josh and together they drive to Boston in the stolen car, even though Eleanore doesn't know how to drive. She drives back to New York and is arrested by NYPD after trying to steal another woman's handbag, but is let out the next morning. The film ends with her in a music and DVD store stealing a DVD and putting it into her CD player, revealing that she essentially learned nothing from her previous altercation and that she will continue to steal.

== Cast ==
- Eleonore Hendricks as Eleonore
- Josh Safdie as Josh
- Jordan Zaldez as Jordan
- Wayne Chin as Wayne
- Francesca LaPrelle as Mom
- Van Neistat as Animal Harraser

== Production ==
In 2007, Josh Safdie was hired by Andy Spade and Anthony Sperduti to create a short film featuring Kate Spade handbags. He devised a concise story about the adventures of a kleptomaniac woman. Eleonore Hendricks, who co-wrote the screenplay, portrayed the lead role. The project eventually turned into a feature film. The film was shot on 16 mm film.

== Release ==
The film had its world premiere in the Emerging Visions section at the 2008 South by Southwest on March 10, 2008. It screened in the Directors' Fortnight section at the 2008 Cannes Film Festival on May 23, 2008. IFC Films acquired North American distribution rights to the film. It was released in the United States in limited theaters on October 3, 2008.

== Reception ==
On review aggregator website Rotten Tomatoes, the film holds an approval rating of 27% based on 11 reviews, with an average rating of 4.1/10.

Nick Schager of Slant Magazine gave the film 1 out of 4 stars, calling it "a preeminent example of what happens when filmmaking tools become accessible to people with nothing to say." Laura Kern of The New York Times commented that the film "exposes itself as a technically deficient bore with little on its agenda." Rob Nelson of Variety wrote, "New York location shooting appears aptly purloined, but tech accomplishments, with muffled dialogue and fuzzy imagery, are borderline appalling even by the old-school DIY standards to which the pic pretentiously aspires."

Olivier Pere, the 2008 Cannes Film Festival's programmer, said, "They express something wild, intimate, and uncompromised about bohemian life in New York." He also stated that the film reminded him of "neorealism and the American underground films of the '60s."

At the 2008 Sarasota Film Festival, the film won the Independent Visions Competition award and the Heineken Red Star award.
