= Dickie Roberts: Former Child Star =

2003 film by Sam Weisman

- Theatrical release poster
- Directed by: Sam Weisman
- Written by: Fred Wolf; David Spade
- Produced by: Adam Sandler; Jack Giarraputo
- Starring: David Spade; Mary McCormack; Jon Lovitz; Craig Bierko; Alyssa Milano; Rob Reiner
- Cinematography: Thomas E. Ackerman
- Edited by: Roger Bondelli
- Music by: Christophe Beck; Waddy Wachtel
- Production company: Happy Madison Productions
- Distributed by: Paramount Pictures
- Release date: September 5, 2003
- Running time: 98 minutes
- Country: United States
- Language: English
- Budget: $17 million
- Box office: $23.7 million

Dickie Roberts: Former Child Star is a 2003 American comedy film directed by Sam Weisman and starring David Spade (who also co-wrote the film with Fred Wolf), Mary McCormack, Jon Lovitz, Craig Bierko, Alyssa Milano, and Rob Reiner.

Spade portrays a child actor who fell into obscurity as an adult and who attempts to revive his career by getting a part in Rob Reiner's next film. In addition, the movie shows Dickie interacting with numerous former child stars, played by over two dozen actual former stars lampooning their careers, such as Leif Garrett, Barry Williams, Corey Feldman, Emmanuel Lewis, Dustin Diamond, and Danny Bonaduce.

The film was released by Paramount Pictures on September 5, 2003 and was both a critical and commercial failure, grossing $23.7 million on a $17 million budget. It also marked Tony Dow, Adam Rich and Jay North's last feature film before their deaths in 2022, 2023 and 2025 respectively, as well as Fred Berry's last film to be released within his lifetime prior to his death less than two months after its release.

== Plot ==
Dickie Roberts is a very young actor who shot to fame on a 1970s television sitcom called The Glimmer Gang with his spoonerism catchphrase "This is Nucking Futs!". His career subsequently halted in the years following the show's cancellation.

Unable to find another acting gig due to his eccentric habits, a now older Dickie has been reduced to parking cars at a Morton's restaurant and appearing on Celebrity Boxing, where he suffers a humiliating first-round defeat to Emmanuel Lewis. In the public eye and to his girlfriend Cyndi, who leaves him on the roadside after a car problem, Dickie is a washed-up loser.

After talking to his old friend Leif Garrett, Dickie is absolutely convinced a new Rob Reiner movie in the works titled Mr. Blake's Backyard will be his comeback. Even after his agent Sidney Wermack fails to land him an audition, Dickie persists. While on duty at Morton's, he joyrides in a customer's vehicle and drops into an Alcoholics Anonymous meeting where he pesters Tom Arnold to connect him with Reiner. After he is kicked out as he's not an alcoholic, Dickie fakes being drunk and mistakenly wanders into a Lamaze class Brendan Fraser is taking with his wife. Fraser finds Dickie's entrance to the class hilarious and ridiculous and agrees to help him out by calling Reiner on his behalf.

Reiner bluntly tells Dickie that the part is not within his abilities because it requires knowing how a regular person lives. Unfortunately, he didn't have a normal childhood (he grew up in the limelight, and his emotionally abusive mother Peggy abandoned him once he stopped earning money). Desperate to prove to Reiner he is right for the part, Dickie manages to sell his raunchy autobiography for $30,000.

With the money, he pays a family to "adopt" him for a month to properly prepare the role. Once Dickie hires his "family", things get off to a rocky start, as George, the bread-winning father, insists that they need the money, despite the reservations of the other family members. Grace, the mother, comes to pity their new "son" and gradually provides him with surrogate guidance. Dickie begins to realize a lesson he read in the script for Mr. Blake's Backyard: "Sometimes all of the things you need are in your own backyard". Dickie learns much about himself and life in general and begins to act less immaturely and more as a third parent. He helps the son Sam secure a date and helps the daughter Sally join the pep squad.

Cyndi returns to him, and he even earns the admiration of George, who turns out to be inept at fidelity. Sidney lands an audition for Dickie by donating one of his kidneys to Reiner after the director is savagely beaten by a psychotic driver whom Dickie provoked while unknowingly driving Reiner's vehicle. Dickie gets the part, proving that "In Hollywood, sometimes your dreams can come true...again".

After learning that George ran off with Cyndi, Dickie gives up the part to take George's place with the family he has come to love as his own. An E! True Hollywood Story story on Dickie, aired not long after, reveals that Dickie has since started his own sitcom starring all of his old friends, as well as his new family (including Grace, whom he has married).

The closing credits are a send-up on Relief albums listed as "To help former child stars" and includes many references to old television sitcoms where Dickie, Leif, their mutual friends, Florence Henderson, Marion Ross, and other former very young stars sing "Child Stars on Your Television".

== Cast ==
- David Spade as Dickie Roberts, a former child star looking to make a comeback.
  - Nicholas Schwerin portrays a younger Dickie.
- Rob Reiner as himself, he is working on a film Mr. Blake's Backyard that Dickie wants to get a part in.
- Mary McCormack as Grace Finney, a woman who reluctantly allows Dickie to live with her family during his audition.
- Jon Lovitz as Sidney Wermack, Dickie's agent.
- Craig Bierko as George Finney, Grace's husband who agrees to let Dickie stay with them without consulting her.
- Alyssa Milano as Cyndi, Dickie's former girlfriend.
- Doris Roberts as Peggy Roberts, the mother of Dickie
- Scott Terra as Sam Finney, the son of Grace and George.
- Jenna Boyd as Sally Finney, the daughter of Grace and George and the sister of Sam.
- Rachel Dratch as Rob Reiner's Secretary
- Edie McClurg as Mrs. Gertrude
- Dick Van Patten as himself
- Michael Buffer as himself, he was the ring announcer on Celebrity Boxing.
- John Farley as a referee on Celebrity Boxing.
- Fred Wolf as Dickie's Corner Man
- Joey Diaz and Kevin Grevioux as Emmanuel's Entourage
- Spencer Garrett and Hal Sparks as Publishers
- Retta as Sad Eye Sadie
- Ian Gomez as Strange Man
- Ambyr Childers as Barbie, a girl who is Sam's love interest.
- Michael McDonald as Maitre D'
- Kevin Farley as a valet
- Sasha Mitchell as an angry Driver
- Erin Murphy as Brittany
- Tom Arnold as himself, he is encountered by Dickie at an Alcoholics Anonymous meeting.
- Jann Carl as herself
- Peter Dante as himself
- Jonathan Loughran as himself
- Florence Henderson as herself, she partakes in the "Child Stars on Your Television" song.
- Marion Ross as herself, she partakes in the "Child Stars on Your Television" song.
- David Soul as himself (archive footage), he was said to be the father of Dickie through Peggy.
- Brendan Fraser as himself (uncredited), Dickie encounters him at a Lamaze class with his wife.

=== Former child star cameos ===
- Danny Bonaduce, he appears as one of Dickie's friends.
- Dustin Diamond, he appears as one of Dickie's friends.
- Corey Feldman, he appears as one of Dickie's friends.
- Emmanuel Lewis as himself, he pairs off against Dickie in Celebrity Boxing.
- Barry Williams, he appears as one of Dickie's friends and doubted that Brendan Fraser would hook him up with Rob Reiner.
- Leif Garrett, he appears as one of Dickie's friends.
- Jay North, as himself

==== "Child Stars on Your Television" song ====
- Willie Aames
- Fred Berry
- Todd Bridges
- Gary Coleman
- Jeff Conaway
- Tony Dow
- Corey Feldman
- Corey Haim
- Christopher Knight
- Barry Livingston
- Mike Lookinland
- Maureen McCormick
- Eddie Mekka
- Jeremy Miller
- Erin Moran
- Haywood Nelson
- Jay North
- Ron Palillo
- Butch Patrick
- Paul Petersen
- Adam Rich
- Rodney Allen Rippy
- Ernest Lee Thomas
- Charlene Tilton

== Production ==
Fred Wolf and David Spade originally wrote a skit in the 1990s for Saturday Night Live about a child star rampage, spoofing The Silence of the Lambs, for when Macaulay Culkin was hosting, but it was cut. The idea was later pitched to The WB, but they turned it down. After receiving a script from Tommy "Winfidel" McNulty titled Child Star, about a child star trying to win a girlfriend without writers or a stuntman, Wolf decided to change the second and third act and change the storyline to a less realistic one where a family agrees to allow a stranger access to their children. Once the second and third act were written, the film, originally written as a dark comedy, was reworked as a lighter comedy. Sally's Brick wall, waterfall routine was something Jenna Boyd was doing on the set between takes. The filmmakers liked it and worked it into the script. The crew built an actual treehouse in the back yard of the house used for the exterior scenes of the Finneys' home. The real homeowners liked it so much, they requested that the producers leave it up after filming.

=== Lawsuit ===
Paramount Pictures was sued for trademark infringement and dilution after the film was released. Paramount had not requested permission from Wham-O for using the Slip 'n Slide in this film. The lawsuit claimed that the film, which portrayed unsafe use of a Slip 'n Slide, might encourage others to use it in an unsafe manner. The lawsuit was dismissed by a California court.

== Reception ==
=== Box office ===
Dickie Roberts: Former Child Star earned $6.7 million on its opening weekend. It went on to gross a worldwide total of $23.7 million against a production budget of $17 million.

=== Critical response ===
On Rotten Tomatoes Dickie Roberts: Former Child Star has an approval rating of 22% based on reviews from 121 critics. The site's consensus is: "A so-so David Spade comedy with a few laughs." On Metacritic the film has a score of 36% based on reviews from 31 critics, indicating "generally unfavorable" reviews. Audiences surveyed by CinemaScore gave the film a grade "B" on scale of A to F.

While critics generally agreed that the premise had potential and appreciated the involvement of actual former child stars, reactions to Spade's humor were mixed, and the attempts to make the film genuinely uplifting and sentimental in its second half were seen as contrived and unnecessary. Roger Ebert gave the movie two-out-of-four stars, noting "Dickie Roberts: Former Child Star has a premise that would be catnip for Steve Martin or Jim Carrey, but David Spade (who, to be fair, came up with the premise) casts a pall of smarmy sincerity over the material", but added Lovitz was "pitch perfect" and the cameo appearances were enjoyable.

Joe Leydon of Variety wrote: "Offers a largely satisfying mix of broad slapstick, seriocomic sentimentality and mostly amusing satirical thrusts at easy targets."

Sheri Linden of The Hollywood Reporter gave it a mixed review: "Generally succeeds -- in hit-and-miss fashion -- at bridging the gap between unlikable jerk and misunderstood good guy, though it's still something of a leap to leading-man territory."

Kevin Thomas of the Los Angeles Times gave the film a positive review: "This sleek and sunny comedy is an all-too-rare example of smart and inventive Hollywood filmmaking."

Peter Hartlaub of the San Francisco Chronicle gave it a positive review, praising the writing saying the film "rises above mediocrity with a steady stream of offbeat humor, as writers Spade and Fred Wolf stubbornly avoid the easy jokes throughout the film." He is also positive about the many cameos and says the film "is elevated from decent to good in the last five minutes, during a hilarious "We Are the World"-style medley among child actors and their parents."
