= Charlotte McKinney =

American actress and model (born 1993)

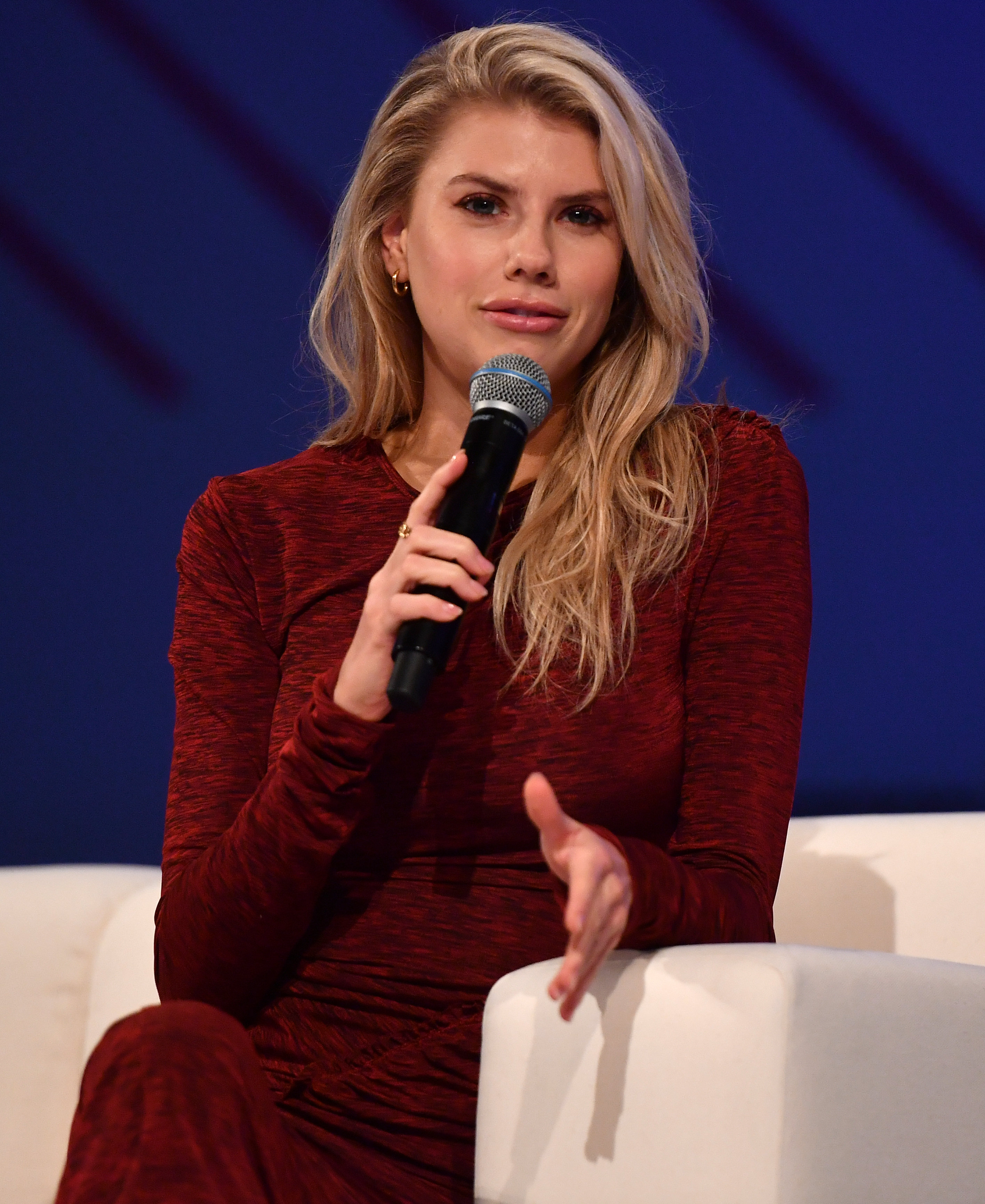
- McKinney at the 2018 Web Summit at the Altice Arena, Lisbon, Portugal
- Born: Charlotte Ann McKinney; August 6, 1993 (age 33); Orlando, Florida, U.S.
- Occupations: Actress; model
- Years active: 2006–present
- Modeling information
- Height: 5 ft 8 in (1.73 m)
- Hair color: Blonde
- Eye color: Blue

Charlotte Ann McKinney (born August 6, 1993) is an American model and actress who first gained attention as an Instagram personality, eventually achieving wider recognition for her appearance in a Carl's Jr. commercial which aired regionally during Super Bowl XLIX in 2015.

== Early life ==
McKinney was born in Orlando, Florida and grew up there. She was bullied at school for having dyslexia and dropped out of high school at age 17.

== Career ==
McKinney, who describes herself as "a curvier bombshell with big boobs," pursued a modeling career but struggled to find success with an agency. Opting to rely on Instagram as a portfolio, she soon became "Insta-famous" and was profiled in Esquire.

McKinney credits Instagram as greatly contributing to the success she achieved after being in Esquire, including campaigns for Guess. She signed with Wilhelmina Models and has graced the cover of numerous fashion magazines including Jezebel, Ocean Drive, GQ Mexico, Galore, and Miami Living also appearing in editorials for Social Life, Men's Health, and Vanity Fair. She was the featured model in Carl's Jr.'s All Natural Burger commercial, which was released online in January 2015 and aired regionally during Super Bowl XLIX.

The viral ad featured McKinney walking around a farmers' market, saying she is "all natural" and using double entendres to imply that she is naked with strategically placed items in the market, until it reveals McKinney in a bikini eating the All Natural Burger. The success of the commercial led to McKinney sometimes being called "the next Kate Upton," who also garnered national attention for appearing in a Carl's Jr. commercial during a Super Bowl. On February 24, 2015, McKinney was announced as one of the celebrities competing on season 20 of Dancing with the Stars. Her professional partner was Keoikantse Motsepe. The couple was the second to be eliminated finishing in 11th place.

McKinney appeared as Missy in the film Joe Dirt 2: Beautiful Loser (2015). In 2017, she acted in the film adaptation of Baywatch and the remake of Flatliners.

== Filmography ==
=== Film ===
Year	Title	Role	Notes
2007	The Diary of Tommy Crisp	Chianti	Short film
2010	Thresholds	Claire	Video short
2015	Joe Dirt 2: Beautiful Loser	Missy	Direct-to-video
2016	The Late Bloomer	Attractive Woman	
2017	Mad Families	Sharni	Direct-to-video
2017	Literally, Right Before Aaron	Charlotte	
2017	Baywatch	Julia	
2017	Flatliners	Girl on Bicycle	
2020	Fantasy Island	Chastity	
2020	Guest House	Jenny	
2020	The Argument	Actor Lisa	
2021	Phobias	Rose	
2023	Miami Bici 2	Kelly	
2026	Busboys	Pam	

=== Television ===
Year	Title	Role	Notes
2006	Doctors	Jenny Nibbs	Episode: "Young at Heart"
2014	Tosh.0	Herself	Episode: "Dumped by Sweetheart"
2015	Dancing with the Stars	Herself / Contestant	Eliminated in 11th place
2015	Doctor Foster	Bridewell Nurse	Episode 1
2015	Ridiculousness	Herself	Episode: "Charlotte McKinney"
2016	Lip Sync Battle	Herself	Episode: "Olivia Munn vs. Kevin Hart"
2017	Growth	Tiffany	Episode: "Hot Yoga"
2018	MacGyver	Mia	Episode: "Hammock + Balcony"
2019	Historical Roasts	Mary Austin	Episode: "Freddie Mercury"
2020	Unbreakable Kimmy Schmidt	Herself	Special: "Kimmy vs the Reverend"
2021	Fast Foodies	Herself	Episode: "Charlotte McKinney"
2023	Laugh-Tastic with Charlotte McKinney	Herself	
2024	Stupid Pet Tricks	Herself	Episode: "Animal Speed Roast"

=== Music videos ===
Year	Song	Artist
2015	"Punching Bag"	Akillezz
2015	"Can It Be You?"	North of Mine
2015	"Might Not"	Belly featuring The Weeknd
2016	"I'm Not the One"	Pete Yorn
2016	"Body Moves"	DNCE
