= Joe Dirt =

2001 film by Dennie Gordon

- Theatrical release poster
- Directed by: Dennie Gordon
- Written by: David Spade; Fred Wolf
- Produced by: Adam Sandler; Robert Simonds
- Starring: David Spade; Brittany Daniel; Christopher Walken; Adam Beach; Rosanna Arquette; Jaime Pressly; Dennis Miller
- Cinematography: John R. Leonetti
- Edited by: Peck Prior
- Music by: Waddy Wachtel
- Production companies: Columbia Pictures; Happy Madison Productions; Robert Simonds Productions
- Distributed by: Sony Pictures Releasing
- Release date: April 11, 2001
- Running time: 91 minutes
- Country: United States
- Language: English
- Budget: $17.7 million
- Box office: $31 million

Joe Dirt is a 2001 American adventure comedy film, directed by Dennie Gordon (in her feature film directorial debut), starring David Spade, Dennis Miller, Christopher Walken, Adam Beach, Brian Thompson, Brittany Daniel, Jaime Pressly, Erik Per Sullivan, and Kid Rock. The film was written by Spade and Fred Wolf, and produced by Robert Simonds.

The plot revolves around a poor young man, Joe Dirt, who at first seems to be a loser. As he travels in search of his parents, his finer qualities are increasingly revealed. He ends up with a new family of close friends, people he has helped and who respect him.

While critical reception was mostly negative, the film was a modest financial success and eventually became a cult favorite.

A sequel, Joe Dirt 2: Beautiful Loser, premiered on Crackle on July 16, 2015, and an animated series is in development at Fox.

== Plot ==
Joe Dirt is a janitor at 98.6 KXLA, a Los Angeles-based radio station, and is brought before a shock jock named Zander Kelly who speaks of his life story while on the air. Joe reveals that as a baby he had a mullet wig installed because the top of his skull had never formed. At age 8, he was left behind by his parents and sister at the Grand Canyon and thus does not know his real surname. After growing up in a series of foster homes, Joe ran away until he arrived in Silvertown, a small chicken town in Idaho. There, he met Brandy and her dog, Charlie, and became a target of jealousy from Robby, the town bully, who also vied for Brandy's affection. After Brandy's alcoholic father shoots Charlie dead after a hunting accident that cost him his leg, Joe decides to try to find his parents.

He details his adventures across the country including discovering what he believed to be a meteorite, only to discover it was solid excrement buildup that fell from a commercial airplane. He inadvertently took a hot air balloon to North Dakota where he took a job at an oil well while making enemies with a wildcatter. He even made friends with Kickin' Wing, an unsuccessful Native American fireworks salesman in New Mexico while acquiring a list of names for those on the 1979 Grand Canyon tour. Afterward, he met a woman named Jill while working on the fairground and while dating her, he learned about her time being separated from her parents, assuming it was his sister. In Indiana, Joe has an encounter with a serial killer named Buffalo Bob, who is parodying the lotion scene from The Silence of the Lambs. After Buffalo Bob is arrested, this event brought Joe unwanted attention from the media but helps his search.

Joe discovered his roots started in Louisiana where he went to next. There he took a job as a high school janitor working with Clem Doore, a former mobster in the Witness Protection Program. Clem rescues students after a mustard gas explosion and informs the media Joe was the hero. Joe then revealed Clem to be the hero, unaware that the Mafia wanted his head. Clem managed to survive the encounter and tipped Joe on the vehicle that his parents used, the Rambler Wagon, to be extremely rare. While traveling on further he came across an alligator farm and met the owner, Charlene. Looking to make money, he was hired to be an alligator wrangler for audiences. After one encounter with an alligator in which he landed wrong, he had an epiphany about his little sister yelling at Joe about why his last name was Dirt and not his real surname Nunamaker. Upon realizing his real last name, Joe discovers the address of his old family home and he travels to Baton Rouge, only to find that they moved away many years prior. Listening to Joe's story, both Zander and the radio audience initially find him an object of scorn, but Joe's kindness and optimistic outlook on life win them over.

Eventually, Joe lands the janitorial job at the radio station, where he recounts how he gave up the search and returned to Silvertown to be with Brandy. However, Robby informed him that he and Brandy were getting married and that she found Joe's parents but instructed him not to tell Joe. Now invested in Joe and his story, Zander calls Brandy to find out why, and she tells Joe his parents were killed the day they were at the Grand Canyon; she pleads with Joe to return to Silvertown. Upset by the news, Joe stays in Los Angeles.

Joe is unaware that he has become a media sensation, but he quickly discovers his newfound fame. An appearance on TRL results in a phone call from a woman claiming to be Joe's mother. Joe meets his parents living in Simi Valley, California, and he discovers that they intentionally abandoned him and that they only reconnected with him to boost their sales of clown figurines. Joe storms out, officially cutting ties with his parents. He intends to commit suicide, but Brandy arrives and finally admits that she lied to him about his parents being dead because she had to protect him from them and their greed after she found out what horrible people they were. Brandy revealed that Robbie lied about the engagement, expressing her love and convinces Joe to come home with her, but he suffers a head injury after a police officer lassos and accidentally causes him to fall off a bridge hitting his head while springing back up.

Joe wakes up in Brandy's house, surrounded by his friends: Kickin' Wing, who reveals that thanks to Joe he now owns 30 successful firework stands, Clem (who is now under the name of Gert B. Frobe) and Charlene (who sold the alligator farm after losing her thumb and middle finger except her ring finger on her left hand to one of the alligators), who are now engaged. Brandy reveals that she got Joe a dreadlock wig following his head operation, has retrieved his Hemi, and she has a new dog that Charlie fathered. As they prepare to take a ride in Joe's Hemi, Robby arrives and tells Joe that no one wants him in Silvertown. Clem threatens Robby and exclaims that they are Joe's family. Robby challenges Joe to a race and Joe leaves him in the dust as Robby's car malfunctions and breaks down. As they drive away, Zander dedicates a song to Joe on the radio.

== Cast ==
- David Spade as Joseph "Joe" Dirt (né Nunamaker)
  - Erik Per Sullivan as Young Joe Dirt
- Brittany Daniel as Brandy
- Dennis Miller as Zander Kelly
- Adam Beach as Kickin' Wing
- Christopher Walken as Anthony Benedetti/Clem Doore/Gert B. Frobe
- Jaime Pressly as Jill
- Kid Rock as Robby
- Rosanna Arquette as Charlene (uncredited)
- Joe Don Baker as Don, Brandy's father (uncredited)
- Megan Harvey as Joe's little sister
- Caroline Aaron as Mrs. Nunamaker (originally filmed with Roseanne Barr in the role)
- Fred Ward as Mr. Nunamaker (originally filmed with Gary Busey in the role)
- Brian Thompson as Buffalo Bob
- Blake Clark as Farmer Fran (reprising his role from The Waterboy)
- Hamilton Camp as Meteor Burt
- Mitzi Martin as Miss Clipper
- Tyler Mane as Bondi
- Kevin Farley as Officer Doughrity
- John P. Farley as KXLA security guard
- Rance Howard as Bomb squad cop
- Steven Brill as Crime scene cop
- Richard Riehle as Car dealer
- Bree Turner as Sorority Girl
- Hal Fishman and Eddie Money as Themselves
- Carson Daly as himself (uncredited)
- Kevin Nealon as Greasy mechanic (uncredited)
- Kathleen Freeman as Foster Mother

== Soundtrack ==
Joe Dirt (Music from the Motion Picture)

Soundtrack album by Various
- Released: April 10, 2001
- Genre: Classic rock
- Length: 50:31
- Label: Legacy Recordings
- Producers: Michael Dilbeck, David Spade (execs.)

No.	Title	Artist	Length
1.	"Sweet Home Alabama"	Lynyrd Skynyrd	3:38
2.	"Walk on Water"	Eddie Money	4:28
3.	"Hold Your Head Up"	Argent	6:17
4.	"You Ain't Seen Nothing Yet"	Bachman-Turner Overdrive	3:27
5.	"When I'm with You"	Sheriff	3:54
6.	"Cat Scratch Fever"	Ted Nugent*	3:39
7.	"Who Do You Love"	George Thorogood & the Destroyers	4:19
8.	"China Grove"	The Doobie Brothers	3:14
9.	"Rocky Mountain Way"	Joe Walsh	5:14
10.	"Roller"	April Wine	4:17
11.	"Burnin' for You"	Blue Oyster Cult	4:30
12.	"If You Want My Love"	Cheap Trick	3:34
Total length:			50:31

*Bonus track not featured in film

Songs not featured on the soundtrack album

- .38 Special – "Hold on Loosely" (1981)
- Bob Seger – "Ramblin' Gamblin' Man" (1968)
- Dave Matthews Band – "Crash into Me" (1996)
- The Doobie Brothers – "Listen to the Music" (1972)
- Eddie Money – "Think I'm in Love" (1982)
- Foghat – "I Just Want to Make Love to You" (1972)
- George Clinton – "Atomic Dog" (1982)
- George Thorogood – "Bad to the Bone" (1982)
- James Gang – "Funk#49" (1970)
- Leif Garrett – "I Was Made for Dancin'" (1977)
- Lynyrd Skynyrd – "That Smell" (1977)
- Thin Lizzy – "Jailbreak" (1976)
- Three Dog Night – "Shambala" (1973)
- Van Halen – "Everybody Wants Some" (1980)

== Reception ==
=== Box office ===
Joe Dirt opened at #4 in the domestic box office with $8,016,008 and went on to gross $27,087,695 domestically and $3,900,000 in other territories for a worldwide total of $30,987,695; from an estimated $17.7 million budget. Since movies typically have to gross twice their budget due to marketing and distribution costs, the movie was probably a financial loss.

=== Critical response ===
On the review aggregator website Rotten Tomatoes, 9% of 75 critics' reviews are positive, with an average rating of 3.1/10. The website's consensus reads: "If you fall within the target audience of Joe Dirt, you may find it funny. Otherwise, the jokes will seem like a tired retread." Metacritic, which uses a weighted average, assigned the film a score of 20 out of 100, based on 26 critics, indicating "generally unfavorable" reviews. Audiences surveyed by CinemaScore gave the film a grade B−.

Ebert and Roeper both gave the film a thumbs down. Richard Roeper criticized the film for being too predictable and strained, and said that the radio station storyline was "absurd". Roger Ebert agreed, but praised Spade for taking on a different role than he is normally associated with, and added that Spade's performance was convincing, despite the film's other shortcomings. Ebert included Joe Dirt as one of his most hated films of all time under the category of "alleged comedies," stating that, "What movies, including Joe Dirt, often do not understand is that the act of being buried in crap is not in and of itself funny."

=== Home media ===
The film gained a cult following, with it being one of the most watched films on Crackle and leading to the development of the sequel.

== Upcoming TV series ==
In early 2010, Spade worked on a pilot with TBS for an animated series based on the film. However, the series never materialized.

In August 2026, an animated series was announced as being in development at Fox, written by Scott Gairdner, with Spade returning.

== Sequel ==
In 2014, Spade revealed in a Reddit question that he was writing a sequel to Joe Dirt for Crackle. Entertainment Weekly has noted that the film is "the first ever made-for-digital sequel". Filming on the sequel began on November 17, 2014, with David Spade posting a first look at Joe Dirt on his Instagram. The film was released in July 2015 and received similarly negative reviews.
