= Francis Valentino =

American drummer

Francis Valentino (born May 30, 1988, in Long Branch, New Jersey) is a drummer who performs and records with a variety of artists.

== Biography ==
In 2006, Francis joined the New Jersey–based rock band Outside the Box which achieved local and regional notoriety by performing with or opening for many national acts. Outside the Box was named the house band at The Stone Pony club in Asbury Park, NJ from 2010 to 2013. Outside The Box released one full-length album entitled "Bridge” which was produced by Jeff Kazee.

Valentino joined Southside Johnny & The Poor Fools in late 2012. A side project of Southside Johnny & The Asbury Jukes, The Poor Fools released one full-length Americana album entitled “Songs From The Barn” which was produced by Jeff Kazee.

In 2013, Valentino joined Reno, Nevada–based American Country band Hellbound Glory which toured as the opening act for Kid Rock's Rebel Soul Tour. The tour featured Kid Rock, Buckcherry and Hellbound Glory. Subsequent touring with Hellbound Glory included dates with ZZ Top, 10 Years (band), Hinder and The Supersuckers. Francis still records with Hellbound Glory.

Since February 2015, Valentino has been touring with Bloomington, Illinois–based guitarist/ songwriter Matthew Curry. Tours have included dates with The Doobie Brothers, Steve Miller Band and Peter Frampton. Francis co-produced Matthew Curry's 2019 album "Open Road".

As of February 2020, Valentino has been a member of David Lee Roth's touring and recording band. Tours have included Kiss' End of the Road World Tour, an unnamed 2025 tour, and 2026’s “Don’t Love Me, Rent Me” tour. Francis can be heard on the "Roth Lives" live studio recordings (recorded live at Henson Studios in 2022).

Valentino was featured in a concert scheduled by June 6, 2025 when Curry released an album titled "One for the Ride".
