= Paperboys (film) =

2001 film by Mike Mills

- Directed by: Mike Mills
- Produced by: Ned Brown, Julia Leach, Andy Spade, Katherine Kennedy
- Cinematography: Joaquín Baca-Asay
- Edited by: Haines Hall
- Music by: Elliott Smith
- Release date: 2001
- Running time: 41 minutes
- Country: United States
- Language: English

Paperboys is a 2001 documentary film by American director Mike Mills.

The 41-minute film, produced by Andy Spade, profiles six paperboys from Stillwater, Minnesota. They invite Mills into their homes, show him their personal effects, and answer questions about their lives and the future of paperboys. Parents weigh in on the benefits of their children's job and share thoughts on how the city has changed over the years. Mills's camera follows the boys on their routes, and the elegiac footage is accented with contemporary music.
