= Mythology (agency) =

Branding studio in New York City

- Type: Private
- Industry: Branding, marketing, advertising, design
- Predecessor: Partners & Spade
- Founded: 2008
- Founder: Andy Spade; Anthony Sperduti
- Headquarters: Manhattan, New York, US
- Key people: Anthony Sperduti (founder); Audrey Attal (partner and creative director); Sophie Mascatello (partner and head of design); Kim Haxton (partner); Ted Galperin (partner and director of retail)
- Website: mythology.com

Mythology is an American branding and design studio based in New York City. The firm was founded in 2008 as Partners & Spade by Andy Spade and Anthony Sperduti, and was renamed Mythology in 2018.

The agency has worked on branding and retail projects for consumer companies.

== History ==
=== Partners & Spade ===
Partners & Spade was established in 2008 by Andy Spade and Anthony Sperduti in Manhattan. In 2008 the studio worked on J.Crew's Liquor Store menswear shop in Tribeca.

In 2012, Partners & Spade collaborated with Warby Parker on a traveling pop-up shop and on the company's flagship store in SoHo. The firm contributed to brand development and the launch of the men's grooming company Harry's in 2013. The same year, Partners & Spade launched Sleepy Jones, a loungewear line referencing artists such as David Hockney, Pablo Picasso, and Jean Seberg.

In 2014, Partners & Spade contributed to Whole Foods Market's national advertising campaign. In 2016, the studio worked on the Sonos flagship store in SoHo.

=== Mythology ===
In 2018, Partners & Spade was renamed Mythology, with Anthony Sperduti remaining in charge. Cofounder Andy Spade had left the studio prior to the rebrand. Audrey Attal is a partner and creative director, and Sophie Mascatello is a partner and head of design.

In 2019, Mythology and PR firm Derris announced Project Mercury, a joint venture to work with very early-stage founders via an open-application process. Mythology's later campaigns included JUST Egg's Earth Day initiative developed with Known, and work for Meta Quest's Supernatural VR fitness platform starring Jane Fonda.

In 2023, Mythology published Work in Progress, a book documenting the process behind its branding projects.

In November 2024, Mythology worked with Target Creative, the retailer's internal marketing team, on holiday advertising that introduced "Kris," a reinterpreted Santa Claus figure, as part of a move toward presenting two separate seasonal campaigns.

In January 2025, Mythology promoted creative director Kim Haxton to partner. Ted Galperin is a partner and director of retail.

== Film ==
Partners & Spade produced or developed several independent film projects. The Black Balloon won the U.S. Short Fiction Award at the 2012 Sundance Film Festival. The studio developed the story for The Pleasure of Being Robbed, directed by Josh Safdie and screened in the 2008 Directors' Fortnight at Cannes. Other projects include Paperboys, a short documentary by Mike Mills, and Dimmer, directed by Talmage Cooley, which is held in the Museum of Modern Art.

== See also ==
- Creative agency
- Brand management
- Experiential marketing
- Retail design
- Direct-to-consumer
- List of advertising agencies
