= Fred Wolf (writer) =

American film director and screenwriter

- Born: United States
- Occupations: Film director, screenwriter, television writer, comedian, actor

Fred Wolf is an American film director, screenwriter, television writer, comedian and actor.

== Career ==
Wolf began his career performing stand-up in Los Angeles in the 1980s, and landed his first major television role as co-host (with Paul Provenza) on the Comedy Central variety series Comics Only in the early 1990s. In 1993, Wolf joined the writing staff of Saturday Night Live and also served for several years, surviving a writers' room overhaul in 1995, and served as head writer up until 1996. In 1996, he joined the SNL cast as a featured player, before leaving the show in October of that same year. Since leaving SNL, he has collaborated with many of his former SNL co-workers, writing and directing films for SNL stars such as Adam Sandler, Chris Farley, Norm Macdonald, David Spade, and Rob Schneider. In particular, he co-wrote the movie Joe Dirt with David Spade.

== Filmography ==
=== Television ===
An asterisk (*) indicates an appearance as an actor.

- The Pat Sajak Show (1989–1990)
- 1993 MTV Movie Awards (1993)
- The Chevy Chase Show (1993)
- Saturday Night Live* (1993–1996)

=== Film ===
Year	Title	Director	Writer	Producer
1995	Tommy Boy	No	Uncredited	No
1996	Black Sheep	No	Yes	No
1998	Dirty Work	No	Yes	No
2001	Joe Dirt	No	Yes	No
2003	Dickie Roberts: Former Child Star	No	Yes	Yes
2004	Without a Paddle	No	Yes	No
2007	I Want Candy	No	Yes	No
2008	Strange Wilderness	Yes	Yes	No
2008	The House Bunny	Yes	No	No
2010	Grown Ups	No	Yes	No
2013	Grown Ups 2	No	Yes	No
2015	Joe Dirt 2: Beautiful Loser	Yes	Yes	Yes
2017	Mad Families	Yes	Yes	No
2019	Drunk Parents	Yes	Yes	No
2021	40-Love	Yes	Yes	No

Acting roles

Year	Title	Role
1996	Black Sheep	Ronald Forte
1998	Dirty Work	Homeless Guy
2000	Little Nicky	Fan
2001	Joe Dirt	Freddy the Producer (uncredited)
2003	Dickie Roberts: Former Child Star	Dickie's Corner Man
2015	Joe Dirt 2: Beautiful Loser	Airplane Tech #1
