= Black Sheep (1996 film) =

1996 American comedy film by Penelope Spheeris

- Theatrical release poster
- Directed by: Penelope Spheeris
- Written by: Fred Wolf
- Produced by: Lorne Michaels
- Starring: Chris Farley; David Spade; Tim Matheson; Christine Ebersole; Gary Busey
- Cinematography: Daryn Okada
- Edited by: Ross Albert
- Music by: William Ross
- Production company: Broadway Video
- Distributed by: Paramount Pictures
- Release date: February 2, 1996
- Running time: 86 minutes
- Country: United States
- Language: English
- Box office: $32.4 million

Black Sheep is a 1996 American comedy film starring Chris Farley and David Spade. It is directed by Penelope Spheeris, is written by Fred Wolf, and also stars Tim Matheson, Christine Ebersole, and Gary Busey. The plot follows a political aide who is assigned to control the brother of a candidate for Governor of Washington, who helps his brother's campaign. It grossed US$32.4 million during its U.S. theatrical run.

== Plot ==
Mike Donnelly, a good-natured but loud and bumbling oddball of his family, is driving an advertisement truck to support his brother Al Donnelly's campaign for Governor of Washington. His competition is the 8-year incumbent, Evelyn Tracy. Mike is chased by dogs while driving and crashes into a local movie theater. Al's campaign manager, Roger Kovary, advises Al to get rid of Mike, but Al decides to have Mike campaign for him in town with the assistance of campaign aide Steve Dodds, who accepts the job in return for a spot on Al's staff following the election. As Steve goes to pick up Mike, he hits crazed Vietnam veteran Sgt. Drake Sabitch, who ends up stealing his rental car.

Later on, Mike tries to stop underage kids from drinking, but incriminating pictures make it look like he was drinking with them, leading to his termination from a Pierce County recreation center. While packing up, he runs into a pair of thugs who set fire to the building, while the same photographer takes potentially incriminating pictures of Mike right after the thugs leave the scene of the fire. However, the first cop to arrive at the scene is Robbie Mieghem, a friend of Mike's who lets him and Steve leave before the police arrive. The two take off in Mike's car and, per Kovary's instructions, head for a shack in rural Garfield County.

The next day, as Steve and Mike hang fliers, Steve tries to make a call via cell phone; while looking for a place with reception, Steve stumbles upon the home of the aforementioned Drake Sabitch - an old school bus with a TV, a hammock, a grill, and several weapons. While trying to find a high-ground to get reception on his phone, Steve accidentally loosens a rock in a pile of stones. Later on, as the guys play checkers, a huge boulder rolls down the mountain, almost completely knocking their cabin off its foundation; that night, a stormy wind blows the roof away and hail falls inside. The next day, Mike tries to talk to Al, but Kovary refuses, so Mike decides to head into Seattle that night to talk to Al, who is going on MTV's Rock the Vote campaign. He impersonates a security guard and shouts down an unruly concertgoer, with clouds of steam coming out his ears. This ingratiates him to the security. Backstage he joins a lively party where they talk to him about how blacks are being kept down. After hanging out and bonding with the Rastafarians and being mistaken for his brother by Mudhoney, Mike cavorts around onstage assumed to be Al as he shouts various oddly misspoken political quotes and slogans (culminating to his yelling "KILL WHITEY!" once he waves to the Rastafarians as the crowd goes suddenly silent) as a shocked Al and Kovary helplessly watch. Because of his stunt, Al decides to no longer let Mike help him with the campaign, leaving Mike down. The next day, Steve and Mike sneak into Drake's home (after dodging some hidden land mines) to watch Al's debate on his TV. When Steve goes outside to use the restroom, he is attacked by Drake, but is saved by Mike, who beats the ex-soldier in unarmed combat. Drake is impressed by Mike's fighting skill and befriends both men.

Governor Tracy, in hopes of sabotaging Al following their debate, purchases the pictures of Mike at the rec center fire and posts them on TV, therefore allowing Tracy to win the election. Mike notices that the total vote count is 1,882 for Garfield County, when in fact there are only 1,502 registered voters there; furthermore, Mike recognizes the two men who set the rec center on fire standing next to Tracy. Mike and Steve go to the Garfield County Courthouse, where they obtain the names of the voters in the election. They discover that over half the people who voted for Tracy have been dead for over ten years (including Drake's father and grandfather), proving Tracy had rigged the elections. To get this to the people and Al, Mike and Steve borrow Robbie's squad car to get to Governor Tracy's victory party the following day.

At the party, the duo appears during Tracy's victory speech and the police try to arrest Mike for arson. At the podium, Mike takes a gun from one of the cops and pretends to hold Steve hostage, while Drake shows up in time to prevent a sniper from shooting Mike and controls the crowd by threatening them with an RPG. Mike reveals Tracy's election fraud, overturning the election results and making Al the winner.

Three months later, Steve is Al's new assistant and advisor, replacing Kovary after earlier in the movie, he made Al choose between his career or being with his "loser" brother and as a result, Al fired him; Al offered Mike a job in his administration, but he declined since he got his job running the recreation center back; and Al has decreased crime rates in Washington. As Al and Steve enter a jet to go to a meeting, Mike's jacket gets caught in the plane's door, causing him to be trapped outside while it takes off.

== Cast ==
- Chris Farley as Mike Donnelly
- David Spade as Steve Dodds
- Tim Matheson as Al Donnelly
- Christine Ebersole as Governor Evelyn Tracy
- Gary Busey as Sgt. Drake Sabitch
- Grant Heslov as Robbie Mieghem
- Timothy Carhart as Roger Kovary
- Bruce McGill as Neuschwander
- Boyd Banks as Clyde Spinoza
- Michael Patrick Carter as Scott Colleary
- David St. James as Motorcycle Cop
- Skip O'Brien as State Trooper
- Chris Owen as Hal
- Mudhoney as Themselves
- Fred Wolf as Ronald Forte
- Julie Benz as Dancing Blonde Woman
- Kathleen O'Malley as Mrs. Oneacre
- John Ashker as Jim Blaine
- Jean Speegle Howard as Harold's mother
- Drew Wilson as Harold

== Production ==
Saturday Night Live creator Lorne Michaels produced the film, which was directed by Wayne's World director Penelope Spheeris. Michaels later said that the film was "an act of desperation by Paramount", in that the movie studio had under-promoted Spade and Farley's 1995 film, Tommy Boy and was now looking to profit from the same comedy formula. Michaels had contentious battles with Paramount over the script of 1993's Wayne's World 2, and the animosity between the two camps spilled over into Farley's contract with Paramount. Although his agent lined up possible roles for Farley in The Cable Guy (for which he was offered $3 million) and Kingpin, Paramount remained firm on wanting another buddy comedy with Farley and Spade.

Having performed an uncredited rewrite on Tommy Boy, Fred Wolf wrote the script for Black Sheep. Wolf said the studio told him to "deliver a finished script by midnight on Sunday, the last day Chris was contractually allowed to get out of the movie. If I didn't have a finished script—any finished script—they were going to sue me." Wolf wrote 45 pages within a few days, and dropped the script off at Paramount 15 minutes before his deadline. After reading the script, Farley said that he "wasn't crazy" about it, and only agreed to do the film after coaxing from David Spade.

Spheeris had disagreements with writer Fred Wolf and David Spade throughout the entire production of the film. Spheeris fired Wolf from the film three times (he was hired back twice by Farley and once by Lorne Michaels), then refused to speak to him and finally banned him from the set. Her relationship with Spade was equally as tumultuous. Speaking to Farley's official biographer, she said, "I don't think I've ever even smiled at anything David Spade's ever done... I still have a recording of a message David left on my answering machine. He said, 'You've spent this whole movie trying to cut my comedy balls off.'" The two worked together again on the 1998 comedy Senseless.

The combination of bright lights on set and working under sunlight while filming Black Sheep caused permanent damage to David Spade's eyes. He said, "I have to wear a hat even indoors and flashes in particular freak me out. I even have to make them turn down the lights in the make-up trailers. I've become such a pain in the butt with this light-sensitive thing, it's a wonder they don't Just Shoot Me!"

== Reception ==
The film grossed $32.4 million in US theaters.

Black Sheep is the final appearance of Spade and Farley together. On Rotten Tomatoes it has an approval rating of 29% based on reviews from 34 critics. The site's consensus states: "Chris Farley and David Spade reunite to diminishing returns in Black Sheep, a comedic retread that succumbs to a woolly plot and sophomoric jokes." Audiences surveyed by CinemaScore gave the film a grade B+ on scale of A to F.

Film critics Gene Siskel and Roger Ebert gave the film "two big thumbs down very big thumbs way down", with Siskel admitting that Black Sheep was one of only three films he ever walked out on, the others being Million Dollar Duck and Maniac. Siskel stated several times that he did not like Chris Farley and thought of him as a terrible actor: "Chris Farley is not funny. I knew John Belushi, I knew John Candy, he's no John Belushi or John Candy." Ebert called it "not only one of the worst comedies I've ever seen, but one of the least ambitious; it doesn't even feel like they're trying to make a good movie." A week later, during their televised review of Happy Gilmore, Ebert tried to defend Farley, saying that he thought Siskel was too hard on him, and that he believed with the right script Farley could be good in a film. He also said that during the initial episode but Siskel dissented "he's not good with any script. He just runs around screams and rolls around on the ground like a fat man".

The opinions of other reviewers were mixed. In his review, Richard Leiby of The Washington Post wrote "Farley and Spade manage to wring humor from a series of juvenile setups and predictable pratfalls." Barry Walters of the San Francisco Examiner wrote that "there isn't one shred of slightly intellectual wit" in the film.

Black Sheep is one of the final films reviewed by Jeffery Lyons and Michael Medved on their PBS television show Sneak Previews. Although both were fans of Farley, Tommy Boy, and director Penelope Spheeris, they said this film was offensive, unfunny, and filled with needless slapstick.
