= Mad Families =

- Directed by: Fred Wolf
- Written by: David Spade; Fred Wolf
- Produced by: Anne Clements; Fred Wolf; Tara L. Craig; Kaylene Carlson; Jennifer Cooper; Charlie Sheen
- Starring: Charlie Sheen; Leah Remini; Naya Rivera; Finesse Mitchell; Charlotte McKinney; Chris Mulkey; Efren Ramirez; Clint Howard; Danny Mora; Barry Shabaka Henley; Tiffany Haddish; Chanel Iman; Juan Gabriel Pareja; Lil Rel Howery
- Cinematography: Timothy A. Burton
- Edited by: Joseph McCasland
- Music by: J. Peter Robinson
- Distributed by: Crackle
- Release date: January 12, 2017
- Running time: 87 minutes
- Country: United States
- Language: English

Mad Families is a 2017 American comedy film directed by Fred Wolf, and starring Charlie Sheen, Leah Remini and Charlotte McKinney. The film is an original production by Crackle.

== Plot ==
A fun Fourth of July outing quickly turns sour when a family discovers that its campsite space has also been assigned to two other families. The three families end up competing for the camping spot.

== Cast ==
- Charlie Sheen as Charlie Jones
- Leah Remini as Cheyenne
- Charlotte McKinney as Sharni
- Clint Howard as Gravy
- Tiffany Haddish as Keko
- Naya Rivera as Felipa
- Dennis Quaid as Head Ranger
- Chanel Iman as Shantaysia
- Efren Ramirez as Rolando
- Chris Mulkey as Tommy
- David Spade as Johnny Jon-John
- Mason Vale Cotton as Chuckie
- Naomi Kyle as Ranger Kelly
- Barry Shabaka Henley as Pops
- Juan Gabriel Pareja as Jose Jonas
- Finesse Mitchell as Franklin
- Danny Mora as Mr. Jonas
- Ashley James as Francesca
- Lil Rel Howery as Ron Ron
- PJ Hubbard as Ron Ron Jr
- Hash Patel as Indian dad
- Aamya Deva Keroles as Lettie
- Justice Alan as Rolando Jr
- Antonio Lewis Todd as Ranger Tony
- Amanda Christine as Ron Ron Kid 2
- Sara Fiona Wolf as Sara
- Clyde Yasuhara as Chinese Dad

== Production ==
Filming began in September 2016 in Los Angeles and concluded on October 10, 2016.
