= Joe Dirt 2: Beautiful Loser =

2015 American comedy film

- Promotional poster
- Directed by: Fred Wolf
- Written by: David Spade; Fred Wolf
- Produced by: Adam Sandler; David Spade; Fred Wolf; Amy S. Kim; Jaimie Burke; Brian Tanke
- Starring: David Spade; Brittany Daniel; Patrick Warburton; Mark McGrath; Dennis Miller; Christopher Walken
- Cinematography: Timothy A. Burton
- Edited by: Joseph McCasland
- Music by: Waddy Wachtel
- Production companies: Sony Pictures Television; Happy Madison Productions; Lifeboat Productions
- Distributed by: Crackle
- Release date: July 16, 2015
- Running time: 110 minutes
- Country: United States
- Language: English
- Budget: $3.7 million

Joe Dirt 2: Beautiful Loser is a 2015 comedy film directed by Fred Wolf and written by Wolf and David Spade. It is the sequel to the 2001 film Joe Dirt. The film stars Spade, reprising his role as the title character, as well as starring Brittany Daniel, Patrick Warburton, Mark McGrath, Dennis Miller, Christopher Walken, and Adam Beach. The film premiered on Crackle on July 16, 2015.

== Plot ==
DJ Zander Kelly (Dennis Miller) recounts a firsthand narrative that begins with Joe Dirt on a bus stop bench speaking to a woman. He reveals that he is waiting for a concert to end because he is part of the janitorial crew and then tells the story of how he lost his wife and children.

Dirt recants Silvertown, Idaho, his marriage to Brandy (Brittany Daniel) and the birth of their triplet daughters Abilene, Cheyenne & Dakota. Dirt's tree-cutting coworkers bully and disrespect him in front of Brandy and his daughters, causing him to realize he is a "loser" and is not seen by his daughters as highly as they once did. Dirt is also fraught with thoughts about Jimmy (Mark McGrath), a rival who seeks Brandy. During a storm, Dirt brings his family to safety only to be obligated to retrieve a gift from the family's trailer. Once inside, Dirt is swept away in a tornado.

Elsewhere, a biker gang altercation ends when Dirt's trailer falls out of the sky and crushes the gang's leader. Dirt emerges from the trailer to learn that by killing the leader, he must don the leader's boots and assume the gang's leadership role. Gang member Foggle (Patrick Warburton) reveals that Dirt is in the year 1965, which he shrugs off. The gang quickly rebels against Dirt, who escapes with the boots, angering Foggle.

Dirt realizes he is in 1965 and decides to purchase collectible comic books at face value, which he buries in a locked box under a tree that he plants. At a drive-in movie theater, sees Brandy and tries to explain his situation but soon realizes it is Brandy's mother, Ashleen. He even encounters the original members of Lynyrd Skynyrd and has a run-in with a younger version of Buffalo Bob.

After having his organs harvested by two nightclub bouncers, Dirt wakes up on what he believes to be a desert island. Dirt has no contact with the outside world until 1977 when he comes across two young hikers. Dirt realizes that he has been living just on the other side of Miami the whole time, and upon demonstrating his futuristic knowledge of NASCAR outcomes, Dirt is recruited into a gambling operation by Clem (Christopher Walken), who is at this time a crime boss.

Though Dirt lavishes in the money he earns as Clem's golden goose, he longs for Brandy. During travel, Dirt is ambushed by the biker gang, but Clem appears to shoot Foggle and save Dirt. Arriving in Silvertown, Dirt catches up to his initial meeting of Brandy only a moment too late, as Jimmy saves her dog. Instead of recognizing him, Brandy thanks Dirt for showing up and goes inside her house for tea with Jimmy.

Dirt's story is truncated when the woman on the bench boards her bus, but Zander continues the story. He iterates that Dirt discovers that Silvertown has become a dystopian place, riddled with crime and homelessness. Foggle is revealed as his guardian angel and guides Dirt to Brandy, whose marriage to Jimmy has no love or commitment left. Though she hardly remembers him, Dirt and Brandy connect by reciting a phrase in unison. After Brandy leaves, Dirt is left distressed in Jimmy's mansion until the guardian angel notifies him that he has learned his lesson. Dirt then wakes to find his wife and children at his side. He is joyous, and he shows newfound self-esteem regarding his status as a husband and father. Dirt takes a walk to find the tree that he planted in 1965, digging around the trunk to find the box of valuable comics. Brandy then tells him that money cannot buy their happiness together.

== Cast ==
- David Spade as Joe Dirt
- Brittany Daniel as Brandy Dirt, Joe's wife
- Patrick Warburton as Foggle/Guardian Angel
- Mark McGrath as Jimmy Yauch
- Dennis Miller as Zander Kelly
- Christopher Walken as Clem Doore
- Allison Gobuzzi as Abilene Dirt, Joe & Brandy's first daughter and Cheyenne & Dakota's triplet sister
- Lauren Gobuzzi as Cheyenne Dirt, Joe & Brandy's second daughter and Abilene & Dakota's triplet sister
- Chloe Guidry as Dakota Dirt, Joe & Brandy's third daughter and Abilene & Cheyenne's triplet sister
- Adam Beach as Kickin' Wing aka Kickin' Ass
- Charlotte McKinney as Missy
- Dallas Taylor as Lucky Louie
- Natalia Cigliuti as Dr. Sue
- Baron Davis as 1977 Doctor
- Scott L. Schwartz as Giant Man
- Jeremy Sande as Jimmy's Friend
- Micky Shiloah as Jock
- Terry Ray as Mr. Yauch
- Errol McDowell as Bob Burns
- Caleb Spillyards as Gary Rossington
- Matthew Curry as Ronnie Van Zant
- Mariana Vicente as Flight Attendant
- Fred Wolf as Airplane Tech
- Kevin Farley as Cal
- Colt Ford as himself
- Adam Eget as Buffalo Bob

== Production ==
In the years following the original, David Spade began getting offers from both UFC president Dana White and Kid Rock to help finance a sequel. Ultimately it was Sony who picked up the project after noticing that the film would become a trending topic whenever it came on TV and felt that it would help them build their Crackle platform. The first public hint of a sequel came on April 30, 2014, David Spade revealed in a Reddit answer that he had written a sequel to Joe Dirt for Crackle, saying: "We wrote a sequel, and we may wind up doing it on Crackle.com, because they want to be the first web address to do a sequel to a movie. Because Sony owns them, and it's a Sony movie. We're trying to find a way to make it for the budget, but we really want to do it. And keep it good." On October 10, 2014, it was announced that Fred Wolf would direct the film, with filming set to start in November 2014. Principal photography began on November 17, 2014. On January 13, 2015, it was announced that Christopher Walken, Dennis Miller, Brittany Daniel and Adam Beach would reprise their roles from the first film, alongside newcomers Mark McGrath and Patrick Warburton.

== Release ==
The film premiered on Crackle on July 16, 2015. In the first five days, the film had been viewed one million times and had amassed over 2 million views by August 4, 2015, making it the most viewed original movie on Crackle. Based on average ticket price, Sony claims the viewership numbers are equal to a theatrical box office take of $16 million. Joe Dirt 2: Beautiful Loser was released on DVD and Blu-ray on January 5, 2016.

== Reception ==
Like its predecessor, Joe Dirt 2: Beautiful Loser received negative reviews from critics. The review aggregator website Rotten Tomatoes reported a 10% rating based on 10 reviews, with an average rating of 2.5 out of 10.
