= Akillezz =

American rapper

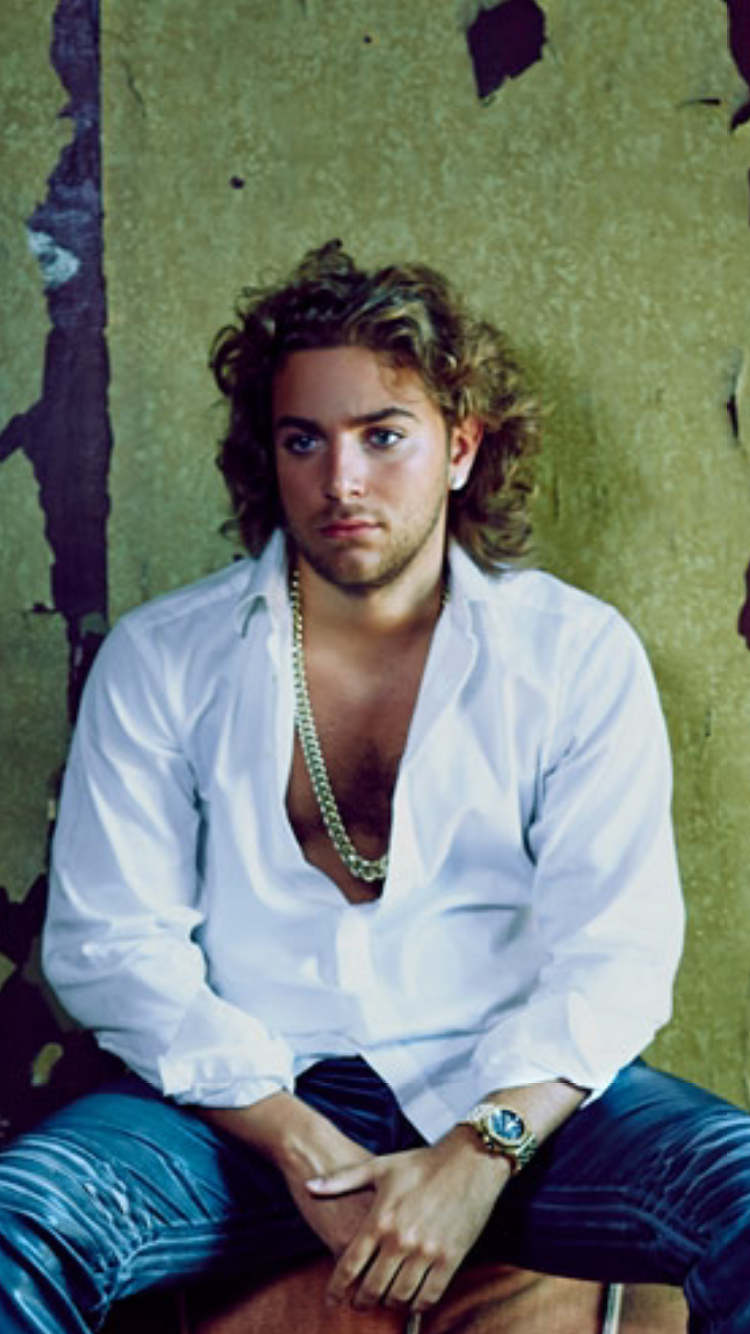
- Akillezz, 2014
- Born: John Arvanitis; March 7, 1994 (age 32); Livingston, New Jersey, US
- Other name: Akillezz
- Occupations: rapper; record producer; songwriter; actor; poet; visual artist
- Years active: 2012–present
- Musical career
- Genre: Hip hop
- Instruments: Vocals; drums
- Label: Akillezz Records
- Website: akillezz.com

John Arvanitis (born March 7, 1994), known by his stage name Akillezz, is an American rapper.

== Biography ==
=== Early life ===
John Arvanitis was raised by his grandparents while both of his parents were focused on their business interests.

After graduating from the Horace Mann School, he concentrated on his music career in collaboration with producer John Jayd Daniels.

=== Career ===
In 2012 he founded the Akillezz Records label.

Arvanitis chose the name "Akillezz" as an allusion to the ancient mythological figure, Achilles. He describes his professional pseudonym as both a reference to his Greek heritage and also to the "sins" that comprise his personal Achilles' heel – though he does not elaborate on what those sins might be. He registered "Akillezz" as a trademark in 2015.

His first two singles off the Transgressionzz album, "One Level" and "Anything" became regional hits in Los Angeles and Vegas clubs and radio in early 2015. His most successful record off the Transgressionzz album, "Punching Bag" was released on April 8, 2015, featuring model and actress Charlotte McKinney and directed by Ben Griffin of Prime Zero Productions.

His first single "One Level" broke at Power 105.1, WWPR-FM, spun by both DJ Self and DJ Suss One and later picked up by DJ Spynfo at Hot 97.1(WQHT New York).

"Punching Bag" directed by Ben Griffin has been the most virally successful music video, although not necessarily the most successful single in terms of sales. While he asked Griffin to bring "Punching Bag" to life in a video, Akillezz was the sole author of the film treatment and retains intellectual property rights in it.

In November 2015 Akillezz released "Circus", in collaboration with Tony Yayo (G-Unit).

Akillezz's first album, Transgressionzz, containing 17 tracks, was released on May 5, 2015. Akillezz said about "Transgressionzz":

All my work, at least as a rapper, is an interrogation process of the English language. What I mean is that I'm confronting language in an investigative way, trying to search for some truth in the semantics of its arrangement both poetical and literal. Transgressionzz, the album, is born of this desire to interrogate violently. My process isn't at all concerned with the pressure of social convention and so very much like the title of the album I felt as if the act of recording this album itself was an act that goes against some command or law; that I was breaking some moral code in recording it. Also, being my debut album, it would adumbrate some violent entry into the music industry.

=== Personal life ===
Akillezz is fluent in Greek and cites his family as being one of his driving inspirations. His parents found that he had an early affinity for language.

=== Musical influences ===
When asked, Akillezz characterizes his music as "dense, technical, syncopated and lyrical". About his writing Akillezz says:

When I write certain records, I think to myself, 'what thematic constructs need to be established so that I can plant my abstract ideals into them?' In other words, I'm creating a diegesis primarily informed by theme when I sit down to write. Even as the song is in the process of being written I begin to consider the plot, which is to say, that I'm searching for a narrative or a plot, very much in the same way that a film might require.

== Performances ==
- MTV Sponsored Event – Akrotiri Boutique – Athens, Greece
- June 2014 – Hot 97's Summer Jam – East Rutherford, New Jersey

== Discography ==
=== Albums ===
- 2015: Transgressionzz

No.	Title	Length
1.	"F**k the World"	4:50
2.	"Enemiezz"	4:46
3.	"Love You Forever"	3:36
4.	"Paris" (Hell of a Life)	4:27
5.	"Watchmaker"	4:19
6.	"Bad Man"	3:23
7.	"Money Anthem"	3:12
8.	"Anything"	3:51
9.	"One Level"	3:25
10.	"I Be On"	3:31
11.	"Couture" ((Million Dollar Man))	4:06
12.	"Shake Down"	3:41
13.	"End of Dayzz"	4:40
14.	"Punching Bag"	3:52
15.	"Soul Extractor"	3:46
16.	"Psycho"	3:51
17.	"#ZeroF**ks"	5:03
Total length:		68:22

=== EPs ===
- 2015: Anything

=== Singles ===
- 2015: "Circus" featuring Tony Yayo

=== Videos ===
No.	Title	Length
1.	"Gravity" (Released January 25, 2013)	4:36
2.	"One Level" (Released January 15, 2015)	3:47
3.	"Anything" (Released February 14, 2015)	3:54
4.	"Punching Bag featuring Charlotte McKinney" (Released April 8, 2015)	4:23
5.	"Enemiezz" (Released August 26, 2015)	4:40

== Filmography ==
- Live It Up with Donna Drake, Season 7 Episode 41, October 10, 2015, Guest (Himself)
