= David Spade =

American comedian and actor (born 1964)

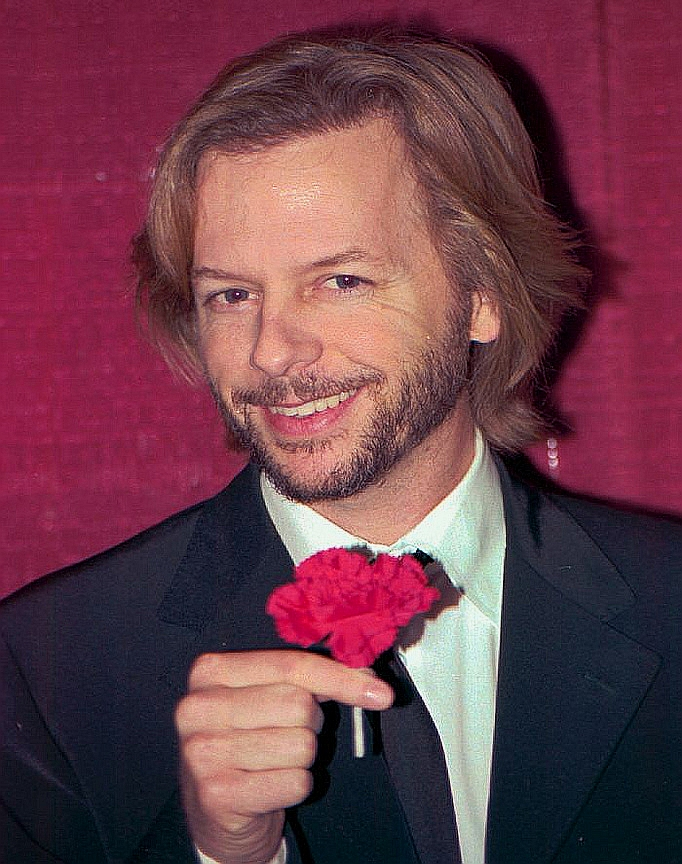
- Spade in 2004
- Born: David Wayne Spade; July 22, 1964 (age 62); Birmingham, Michigan, U.S.
- Occupations: Comedian; actor; podcaster
- Children: 1
- Relatives: Andy Spade (brother)

Comedy career
- Years active: 1987–present
- Medium: Stand-up; television; film
- Genres: Sketch comedy; observational comedy; insult comedy; slapstick; satire; sarcasm; self-deprecation
- Website: davidspade.com

David Wayne Spade (born July 22, 1964) is an American stand-up comedian, actor and podcaster. His comedic style, in both his stand-up material and acting roles, relies heavily on sarcasm and self-deprecation. For his roles on television, Spade has received nominations for four Primetime Emmy Awards and two Golden Globe Awards. In 2003, he received a star on the Hollywood Walk of Fame.

After several years as a stand-up comedian, Spade rose to prominence as a writer and cast member on the NBC sketch comedy series Saturday Night Live from 1990 to 1996. He played Dennis Finch in the NBC sitcom Just Shoot Me! (1997–2003) for which he was nominated for the Primetime Emmy Award for Outstanding Supporting Actor in a Comedy Series. He later acted in the ABC sitcom 8 Simple Rules (2004–2005) and the CBS sitcom Rules of Engagement (2007–2013). He hosted the Comedy Central late-night talk show Lights Out with David Spade (2019–2020).

On film, he took leading roles in Tommy Boy (1995), Black Sheep (1996), Senseless (1998), Joe Dirt (2001), Dickie Roberts: Former Child Star (2003), The Do-Over (2016), and The Wrong Missy (2020) with supporting roles in The Benchwarmers (2006), Grown Ups (2010), its 2013 sequel, and The Ridiculous 6 (2015). He voiced Ranger Frank in The Rugrats Movie (1998), Kuzco in Disney's The Emperor's New Groove (2000) and Kronk's New Groove (2005), and Griffin the Invisible Man in the Hotel Transylvania film series (2012–2022).

Since 2022, Spade has hosted the podcast Fly on the Wall with Dana Carvey. He hosted the Fox game show Snake Oil (2023).

== Early life ==
Spade was born on July 22, 1964, in Birmingham, Michigan, to Judith J. (née Meek), a writer and magazine editor, and Wayne M. "Sam" Spade, a sales representative. His older brothers are Bryan and Andy Spade. The latter is an entrepreneur who, together with David's sister-in-law Kate Spade, co-founded the designer brand Kate Spade New York.

Spade and his family moved to Scottsdale, Arizona, when he was four years old. His parents divorced soon thereafter, and he and his brothers were raised for the most part by their mother, in relative poverty.

Spade attended Saguaro High School and later Scottsdale Community College before transferring to Arizona State University and dropping out shortly thereafter since he was making a decent living doing stand-up. He also was a member of the Sigma Alpha Epsilon fraternity. Spade performed standup at the university's long-running sketch comedy show, Farce Side Comedy Hour, on numerous occasions. In the mid-1980s he also did stand-up in the Monday night comedy show at Greasy Tony's Pizza in Tempe, Arizona.

== Career ==
=== 1987–1997: Early work and Saturday Night Live ===
Spade began performing stand-up comedy after dropping out of college. After being spotted by a talent agent while performing at The Improv in Los Angeles he was cast in the 1987 film Police Academy 4. With the help of friend and fellow comedian Dennis Miller, he joined Saturday Night Live in 1990. Spade started as a writer and eventually moved up to cast member. While there, he became known for his brand of sarcasm, and his characters in a number of sketches were hits. Some of them include a flight attendant for "Total Bastard Airlines" who bids a dismissive "Buh-Bye" to each passenger upon deplaning; a receptionist for Dick Clark who, as a matter of policy, asks people indiscriminately, "And you are?"; and the quick-witted "Hollywood Minute" reporter who roasts celebrities with personal one-liners. Other characters include Christy Henderson from the Gap Girls and Karl from the Karl's Video sketches. He also did impressions of various celebrities, including Brad Pitt and Michael J. Fox. According to interviews with Spade, most of the material that he wrote early in his time at SNL was given to Dana Carvey to perform on the show. Spade, alongside Chris Farley, Chris Rock, Adam Sandler and Rob Schneider were known as the "Bad Boys" of SNL.

After the major cast overhaul following the 1994–1995 season, Spade agreed to remain on the show for the 1995–96 season to serve as a bridge between the former cast and new cast members Will Ferrell, Molly Shannon, and Cheri Oteri. During this season, Spade was given a weekly segment called "Spade in America" which was a spin-off of his "Hollywood Minute" and "Weekend Update" commentaries. On December 9, 1995, Spade revived "Hollywood Minute" inside one of his "Spade in America" segments; Spade joked, "Look, children, it's a falling star. Make a wish!" next to a picture of former Saturday Night Live cast member Eddie Murphy. The one-liner referred to Murphy's lack of recent box office success, especially the bomb Vampire in Brooklyn. The quip made Murphy turn against both Spade and SNL for several years afterward. Spade wrote in his 2015 memoir that he received an angry phone call from Murphy two days later at the SNL offices; the two did not reconcile until a chance meeting in 2011. Spade left SNL in 1996. He returned to host an episode in 1998 and another in 2005.

Spade starred with fellow Saturday Night Live cast member Chris Farley in two buddy comedy films, Tommy Boy (1995) and Black Sheep (1996), both of which were distributed by Paramount Pictures. The two were planning a third film together, but Farley died of a drug overdose in 1997 at the age of 33 and thus it was cancelled. When Spade declined to attend Farley's funeral, rumors abounded that there had been a falling out between the two. Spade stated that their friendship had been under some tension, partly because of Farley's drug problem and reckless lifestyle, which Spade admittedly could not keep up with, and had to distance himself out of self-preservation. However, it never escalated to ill will, and that the reason he did not attend the funeral was simply because he could not handle it emotionally.

=== 1997–2018: Sitcom success and film roles ===
Although he received several offers to star in his own TV shows, he turned them down and joined the ensemble cast of Steven Levitan's office sitcom Just Shoot Me!, opposite Laura San Giacomo and George Segal, which ran for seven seasons from 1997 to 2003. He played a sarcastic receptionist, Dennis Finch. In 1998, Spade appeared with Marlon Wayans in the buddy comedy film Senseless and voiced Ranger Frank in The Rugrats Movie. In 2000, he provided the voice of Kuzco in Disney's buddy comedy film, The Emperor's New Groove (2000) and would later reprise the role in its direct-to-video sequel Kronk's New Groove (2005).

While appearing on Just Shoot Me, Spade had his first solo starring role as the title character in the 2001 film Joe Dirt, which was a modest box office success. The film was co-written by Spade and Fred Wolf. Spade starred again in the 2003 film Dickie Roberts: Former Child Star, again co-written by Spade and Wolf. These were the first of many films in which Spade has appeared that were produced by another Saturday Night Live castmate, Adam Sandler. Most notable among these are the films Grown Ups (2010) and Grown Ups 2 (2013), both of which included Spade and Sandler among the lead roles, and both of which were major box office hits. Other collaborations with Sandler include Grandma's Boy (2006), The Benchwarmers (2006), I Now Pronounce You Chuck & Larry (2007), Jack & Jill (2011), Joe Dirt 2 (2015), The Ridiculous 6 (2015), The Do-Over (2016), The Wrong Missy (2020), as well as voicing Griffin the Invisible Man in the Hotel Transylvania film series (2012–2022).

Spade hosted both the Teen Choice Awards and SpikeTV's Video Game Awards in 2003. He voiced characters on several episodes of Beavis and Butt-Head and produced his own TV series Sammy in 2000. In 2004, he joined the cast of 8 Simple Rules, following the death of the sitcom's star, John Ritter, for the show's third and final season. He hosted the Comedy Central TV show The Showbiz Show with David Spade for three seasons, from September 2005 to October 2007. On the show, Spade made fun of Hollywood and celebrities in a manner similar to his old "Hollywood Minute" segment on SNL.

In the 2006 video game The Legend of Spyro: A New Beginning, Spade provided the voice of Spyro's dragonfly companion, Sparx. From 2007 to 2013, he starred as Russell Dunbar in the ensemble CBS sitcom Rules of Engagement. In 2010, he worked with TBS on a pilot for an animated series based on Joe Dirt, but it was eventually dropped.

In 2014, Spade had a guest role on an episode of ABC sitcom The Goldbergs (on which George Segal, his former Just Shoot Me co-star, has a major role as "Pops", the protagonist's grandfather). The end credits featured an interaction between Pops and Spade's character. In 2018, Spade appeared in his first major dramatic role in the movie Warning Shot co-starring Bruce Dern and James Earl Jones, with Spade playing the dangerous grandson of a powerful business tycoon (Dern).

=== 2019–present: Late-night talk show and podcast ===
In 2019, he started hosting a new late-night show called Lights Out with David Spade on Comedy Central. The television spot was right after The Daily Show in the former slot inhabited by The Colbert Report, The Nightly Show with Larry Wilmore and The Opposition with Jordan Klepper. As the production was put on hold during the COVID-19 pandemic, Comedy Central announced the show would not return to the channel once production can resume, but is instead being shopped around to a third-party broadcaster.

In August 2020, Spade guest hosted two episodes of Jimmy Kimmel Live! while Kimmel took a summer vacation. In 2022, Spade began co-hosting the Fly on the Wall podcast with fellow Saturday Night Live alum Dana Carvey. Guests include former cast members and hosts of SNL. In 2024, the Superfly video podcast (a spinoff of Fly on the Wall) co-hosted by Spade and Carvey was launched. On April 18, 2023, it was announced that Spade would host Snake Oil, a new game show broadcast by Fox.

== Personal life ==
Spade has dated numerous actresses and celebrities, including Heather Locklear, Lara Flynn Boyle, Julie Bowen, Teri Hatcher, and Naya Rivera. In 2017, E! called him "a bachelor-era George Clooney of the comedy world". He and 2005 Playboy Playmate Jillian Grace have a daughter together, Harper.

On November 29, 2000, Spade was attacked by his assistant, David Warren "Skippy" Malloy, while he was sleeping. Malloy used a stun gun on Spade after breaking into his home in the early morning hours. In an interview with Howard Stern, Spade stated that he managed to get away from the 350-pound (160 kg) Malloy, run to his bedroom, grab his gun and defend himself by locking himself in a bathroom armed with his shotgun. Malloy pleaded guilty and avoided jail time on condition that he seek counseling for drug and psychological problems. He subsequently received five years' probation, was ordered to stay at least 100 yards away from Spade, and was required by the court to perform 480 hours of community service.

Spade primarily resides in Beverly Hills, California, although he also owns residences in Hollywood Hills and West Hollywood. His Beverly Hills house was burglarized in June 2017. He stated on the Fly on The Wall podcast that he is a Christian.

=== Philanthropy ===
In December 2005, Spade donated $100,000 to the Phoenix Police Department to buy 300 firearms, including 50 AR-15 rifles for its patrol officers. Spade also donated $200,000 to the Oklahoma tornado relief program on May 20, 2013, $100,000 toward the ALS ice bucket challenge in 2014, and $100,000 to the National Alliance on Mental Illness (NAMI) in June 2018 following the suicide of his sister-in-law Kate Spade, a fashion designer.

== Filmography ==
=== Film ===
Year	Title	Role	Notes
1987	Police Academy 4: Citizens on Patrol	Kyle	
1992	Light Sleeper	Theological Cokehead	
1993	Coneheads	Eli Turnbull	
1994	Reality Bites	The "Wienerschnitzel" Manager	Uncredited
1994	PCU	Rand McPherson	
1995	Tommy Boy	Richard Hayden	
1996	Black Sheep	Steven "Steve" Dodds	
1996	A Very Brady Sequel	Sergio	Uncredited
1997	8 Heads in a Duffel Bag	Ernest "Ernie" Lipscomb	
1998	Senseless	Scott Thorpe	
1998	The Rugrats Movie	Ranger Franklin	Voice only
1999	Lost & Found	Dylan Ramsey	Also writer
2000	Loser	Video Store Clerk	Uncredited
2000	The Emperor's New Groove	Emperor Kuzco	Voice only
2001	Joe Dirt	Joseph "Joe" Dirt	Also writer
2003	Dickie Roberts: Former Child Star	Dickie Roberts	Also writer
2005	Racing Stripes	Scuzz	Voice only
2005	Lil' Pimp	Principal Nixon	Voice only; direct-to-DVD
2005	Kronk's New Groove	Emperor Kuzco	Voice only; direct-to-DVD
2006	Grandma's Boy	Shiloh	
2006	The Benchwarmers	Richie Goodman	
2007	I Now Pronounce You Chuck & Larry	Transvestite Groupie	Cameo
2010	Grown Ups	Marcus Higgins	
2011	Jack & Jill	Monica	
2012	Hotel Transylvania	Griffin the Invisible Man	Voice only
2013	Jungle Master	Boss Cain	Voice only
2013	Snowflake, the White Gorilla	Aliur	Voice only: English language dub
2013	Grown Ups 2	Marcus Higgins	
2015	Space Breakout	Xanor	Voice only
2015	Joe Dirt 2: Beautiful Loser	Joseph "Joe" Dirt	Also writer/executive producer
2015	I Am Chris Farley	Himself	Documentary
2015	Hotel Transylvania 2	Griffin the Invisible Man	Voice only
2015	The Ridiculous 6	General Custer	
2016	The Do-Over	Charlie McMillian	
2017	Mad Families	Johnny Jon-John	Also writer
2017	Sandy Wexler	Himself	
2018	Hotel Transylvania 3: Summer Vacation	Griffin the Invisible Man	Voice only
2018	Father of the Year	Wayne	
2018	Warning Shot	Bobby	
2020	The Wrong Missy	Tim Morris	
2022	Hotel Transylvania: Transformania	Griffin the Invisible Man	Voice only
2023	Once Upon a Studio	Emperor Kuzco	Short film, voice only (archival audio)
2026	Outcome	Buddy	
2026	Busboys	Markie	
TBA	Grown Ups 3	Marcus Higgins	Filming

=== Television ===
Year	Title	Role	Notes
1988	The Facts of Life	Scott	Episode: "Big Apple Blues"
1989	Baywatch	B. J.	Episode: "Second Wave"
1990	ALF	Larry Slotkin	Episode: "Make 'em Laugh"
1990	Monsters	Teddy	Episode: "Small Blessings"
1990	Born To Be Mild	Stage Assistant	Uncredited; Television film
1990–1996	Saturday Night Live	Various roles	104 episodes; also writer
1992, 1998	The Larry Sanders Show	Himself	2 episodes
1993–1995	Beavis and Butt-Head	Mr. Manners /Mr. Candy /Ticket Attendant	Voices; 3 episodes
1997–2003	Just Shoot Me!	Dennis Finch	149 episodes
1998, 2005	Saturday Night Live	Himself (host)	Episode: "David Spade/Eagle-Eye Cherry"
2000	Sammy	Sammy Blake /James Blake	Voice; 13 episodes
2002	Greg the Bunny	Himself	Episode: "Welcome to Sweetknuckle Junction"
2003	2003 Spike Video Game Awards	Himself (host)	Television special
2004	Father of the Pride	Tommy the Coyote	Voice; Episode: "Road Trip"
2004–2005	8 Simple Rules	C. J. Barnes	39 episodes
2005–2007	The Showbiz Show with David Spade	Himself (host)	39 episodes; also writer and executive producer
2007–2013	Rules of Engagement	Russell Dunbar	100 episodes
2009	Curb Your Enthusiasm	Himself	Episode: "The Reunion"
2011	Entourage	Himself	Episode: "The Big Bang"
2012	Hot in Cleveland	Christopher	Episode: "Blow Outs"
2014	The Spoils of Babylon	Talc Munson	2 episodes
2014	My Fake Problems	Himself	Stand-up special
2014	The Goldbergs	Gus	Episode: "Love is a Mixtape"
2015	Real Rob	Himself	Episode: "VIP Treatment"
2015	Saturday Night Live 40th Anniversary Special	Flight Attendant/Himself	Television special
2015–2017	Fameless	Himself	7 episodes
2016	Crowded	Kyle	Episode: "RearviewMirror"
2016	Inside Amy Schumer	Showrunner	Episode: "Welcome to the Gun Show"
2016	Roadies	Harris DeSoto	4 episodes
2016	Comedy Central Roast of Rob Lowe	Himself (roastmaster)	Television special
2017–2018	Love	Steven Hopkins	4 episodes
2017	Jimmy Kimmel Live!	Himself (guest host)	1 episode
2017	Lady Dynamite	Himself	Episode: "Kids Have to Dance"
2017	The Mayor	Ed Gunt	7 episodes
2019–2020	Lights Out with David Spade	Himself (host)	Also creator, writer and executive producer
2020	The Ellen DeGeneres Show	Himself	Episode: "Pink and David Spade"
2020	Home Movie: The Princess Bride	Westley	Episode: "Chapter Four: Battle of the Wits"
2020–2021	The Netflix Afterparty	Himself (host)	11 episodes
2021	Mr. Mayor	Himself	Episode: "Brentwood Trash"
2021	The Circle Afterparty	Himself (host)	
2021	Bachelor in Paradise	Himself (host)	2 Episodes
2022	Nothing Personal	Himself	Stand-up special
2022	Norm Macdonald: Nothing Special	Himself	Stand-up special
2022	HouseBroken	Himself	Voice; 2 episodes
2023	Snake Oil	Himself (host)	10 episodes
2025	Saturday Night Live 50th Anniversary Special	Himself	Television special

=== Video games ===
Year	Title	Voice role
2006	The Legend of Spyro: A New Beginning	Sparx

=== Music videos ===
Year	Title	Performer
1993	"Buddy"	Adam Sandler
2018	"Gucci Flip Flops"	Bhad Bhabie

=== Web ===
Year	Title	Role	Notes
2022–present	Fly on the Wall	Himself/Co-host	
2024–present	Superfly	Himself/Co-host	

=== Comedy specials ===
Year	Title	Role	Notes
1998	David Spade: Take the Hit	Himself	HBO special
2014	David Spade: My Fake Problems	Himself	Comedy Central special
2022	David Spade: Nothing Personal	Himself	Netflix special
2025	David Spade: Dandelion	Himself	Amazon Prime special

== Awards and nominations ==
On September 5, 2003, Spade received a star on the Hollywood Walk of Fame.

Year	Association	Category	Project	Result	Ref.
1990	Primetime Emmy Award	Outstanding Writing for a Variety Series	Saturday Night Live	Nominated	
1991	Primetime Emmy Award	Outstanding Writing for a Variety Series	Saturday Night Live	Nominated	
1993	Primetime Emmy Award	Outstanding Writing for a Variety Series	Saturday Night Live	Nominated	
1995	MTV Movie Award	Best On-Screen Duo	Tommy Boy	Won	
1999	Primetime Emmy Awards	Outstanding Supporting Actor in a Comedy Series	Just Shoot Me!	Nominated	
1999	Golden Globe Awards	Best Supporting Actor – Series, Miniseries or Television Film	Just Shoot Me!	Nominated	
1999	American Comedy Award	Funniest Supporting Actor in a Comedy Series	Just Shoot Me!	Nominated	
2000	Golden Globe Awards	Best Supporting Actor - Series, Miniseries or Television Movie	Just Shoot Me!	Nominated	
2000	Nickelodeon Kids' Choice Awards	Favorite Voice from an Animated Movie	The Emperor's New Groove	Nominated	
2006	Teen Choice Award	Best Choice Chemistry	The Benchwarmers	Nominated	
2011	Razzie Awards	Worst Supporting Actress	Jack & Jill	Won	
2013	Razzie Awards	Worst Screen Combo (shared with the entire cast)	Grown Ups 2	Nominated	
2020	Razzie Awards	Worst Actor	The Wrong Missy	Nominated	
2020	Razzie Awards	Worst Screen Combo	The Wrong Missy	Nominated	

Preceded by First host	Teen Choice Awards host 2003	Succeeded by Nicole Richie and Paris Hilton
