= Kate Spade New York =

American fashion design house

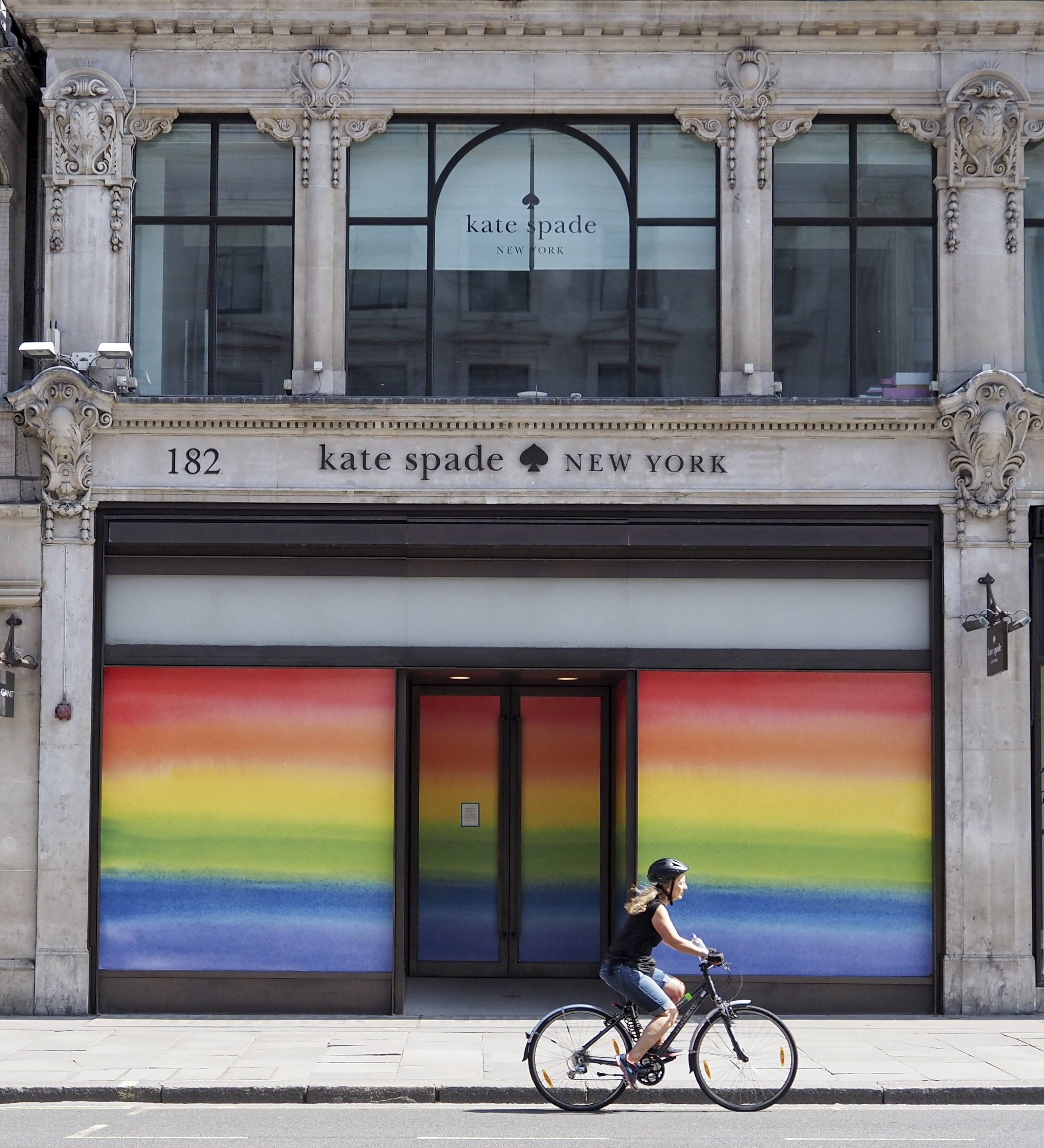
- Kate Spade store on Regent Street in London, United Kingdom
- Type: Subsidiary
- Industry: Fashion
- Founded: January 1993; 33 years ago in Kansas City, Missouri, U.S.
- Founders: Andy Spade; Kate Spade
- Headquarters: New York City, U.S.
- Number of locations: 179 stores
- Products: Handbags; ready-to-wear; accessories
- Parent: Tapestry, Inc.
- Website: katespade.com

Kate Spade New York (stylized as "kate spade NEW YORK" sometimes with a "♠") is an American fashion house founded in January 1993 by Kate and Andy Spade, along with Elyce Arons and Pamela Bell. In 2017, the company was purchased by Tapestry, Inc., formerly known as Coach, Inc.

== History ==
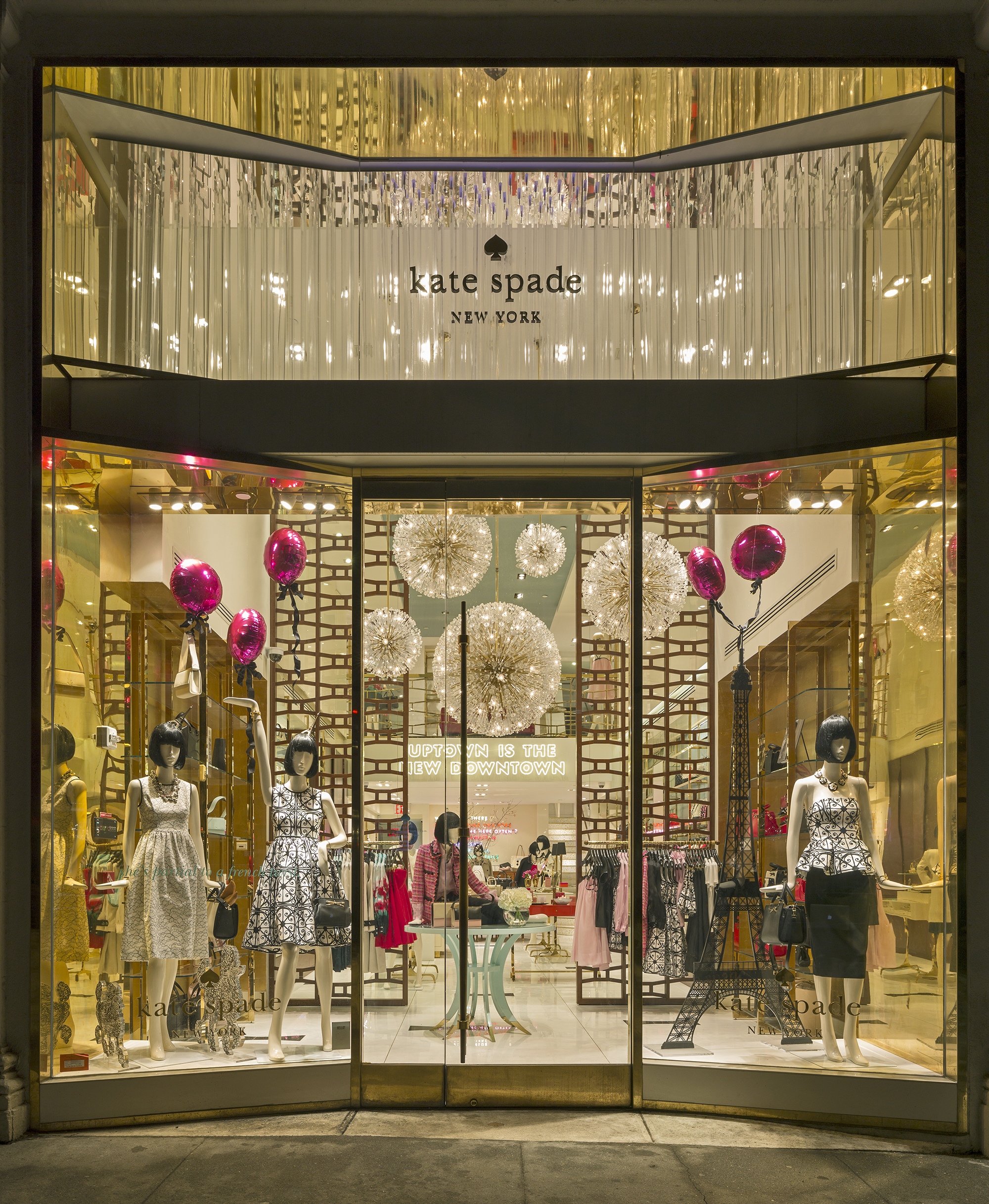
Store on Madison Avenue

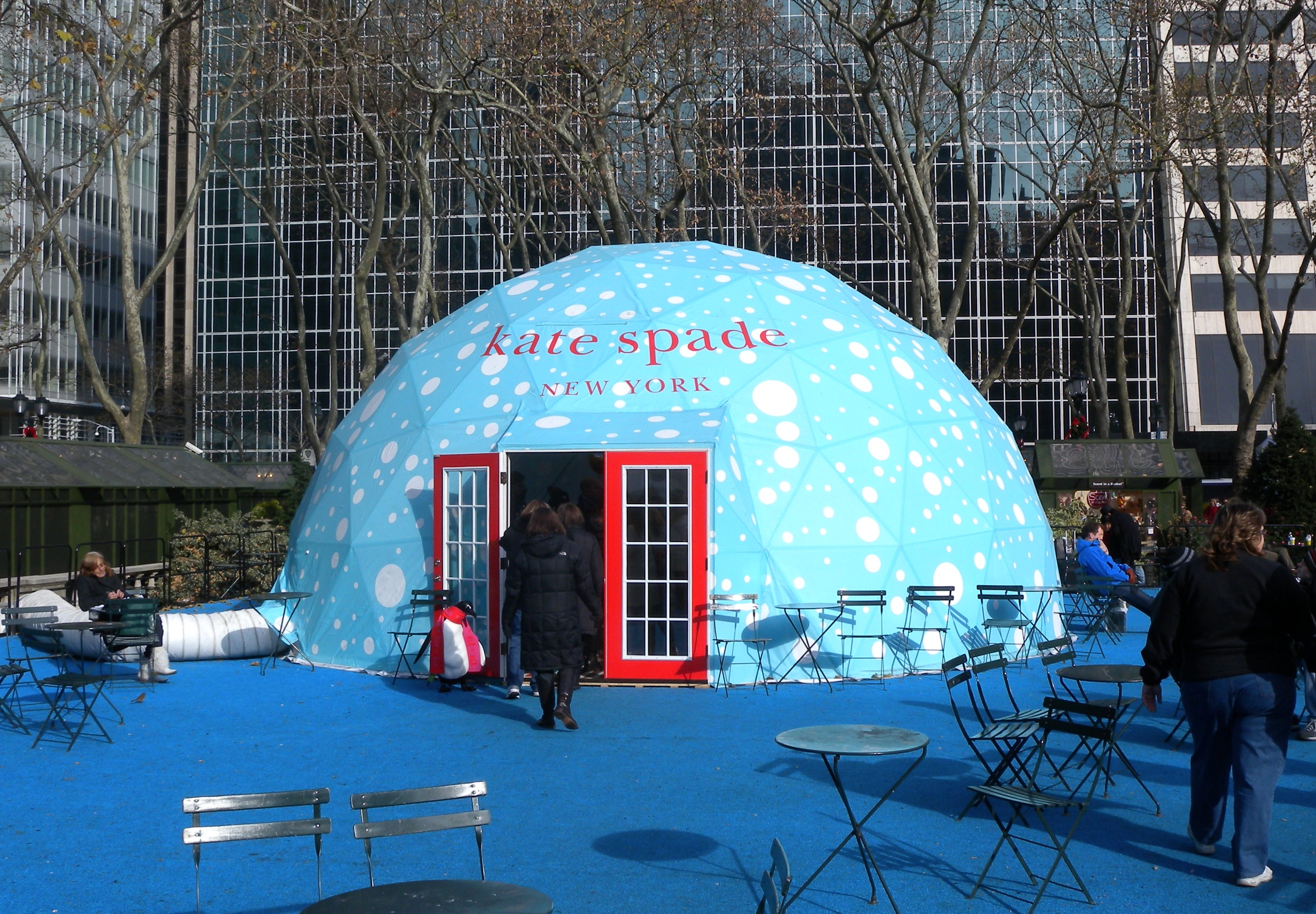
Temporary shop in New York

=== Prior to company creation ===
Katherine Noel Brosnahan (later known as Kate Spade) was born on December 24, 1962, in Kansas City, Missouri. She grew up in Kansas City and went to an all-girls Catholic high school. Eventually she moved to Arizona, where she attended Arizona State University and graduated in 1985. It is there that she met her future husband, Andy Spade. Katherine majored in journalism, while Andy majored in architecture.

In 1986, after completing their education, the couple moved to New York City. It was in New York that Katherine worked as a style editor for Mademoiselle, but left in 1991 (with the title of senior editor/head of accessories) to start her own handbag line. To get inspiration, Kate browsed local flea markets and secondhand stores. She also researched the styles, fabrics, and potential production costs of making her own handbags. The team slowly worked their way up the social ladder until they were able to create a company that would be noticed by the public.

=== Early stages ===
Kate Spade New York was founded in 1993 by Katherine Noel Brosnahan and her husband/business partner Andy Spade, along with Elyce Arons and Pamela Bell. Kate Spade New York started after a suggestion from Andy when Katherine was unsure about her next career move after working six years at Mademoiselle. Originally, the business started out with the Sam handbag. Eventually, Andy withdrew $35,000 from his 401K account to fund the production of Katherine's handbags. Her debut line infused classic shapes, colors, and fabrics into a now iconic square bag with a small black label sewn to the outside of the bag that said "Kate Spade New York." Her main target market at this time was the upper middle class.

In 1996, Spade's company opened its first shop in New York City's SoHo neighborhood. Kate Spade rose in eight months after a journalist at Cleveland Research Co. recommended buying the shares because of the brand's growth potential.

After 1998 the company began to expand, with sales totaling $27 million. In 1999, Neiman Marcus Group paid $34 million for a 56% stake of the company. In 2006 when Neiman Marcus Group acquired the remaining 44% stake in Kate Spade for $59.4 M, revenue was reportedly near $99 million. This acquisition valued the company at $134 million.

=== Later stages ===
In 2004, Kate Spade operated only 13 stores in the United States, and did not ship out of the country (Cohen 198). The company initially sold handbags, but eventually extended to include stationery, personal organizers, address books, shoes, beauty products, perfume, raincoats, pajamas, eyewear, and clothing. It now has a full women's clothing line. The business' clothing and handbag lines are featured in retail stores all across the United States. Products are easily and continuously shipped around the world. By 2004, Kate Spade & Co. was worth $70 million, not including the complementary company Jack Spade. Kate Spade has over 180 stores around the world, and is sold in more than 400 stores worldwide (Cohen 198). Kate and Andy went from taking "the nothing black bag" to a creative personalized purse, to later creating merchandise from the simple tote to home decor and bedding.

In November 2006, apparel giant Liz Claiborne Inc. bought Kate Spade for $124 million from Neiman Marcus Group. Andy Spade was initially in charge of company operations, but, in 2007 after the sale of the company, operational control was turned over to Liz Claiborne. Kate Spade expanded their retail stores to include Kate Spade New York Outlets. The brand has over 47 outlet locations across the United States. The outlets offer Kate Spade New York handbags, clothing, jewelry, and accessories at a discounted price. Kate Spade New York Products are also sold in major department stores including Nordstrom, Macy's, and Dillard's. Kate Spade New York handbags, clothing, jewelry, accessories, and home products can be found in these major department stores. Kate Spade Home products are also sold at Bed, Bath and Beyond. As of January 2017, Kate Spade New York also debuted an exclusive collection with Williams Sonoma, including dinnerware, glassware, and flatware.

Tapestry, Inc. purchased Kate Spade & Company in July 2017 for $2.4 billion.

In June 2018, following the death of Kate Spade by suicide, Tapestry, Inc. announced a plan to donate $1 million towards mental health awareness, starting with a $250,000 donation to Crisis Text Line.

== Company ==
=== Merchandise ===
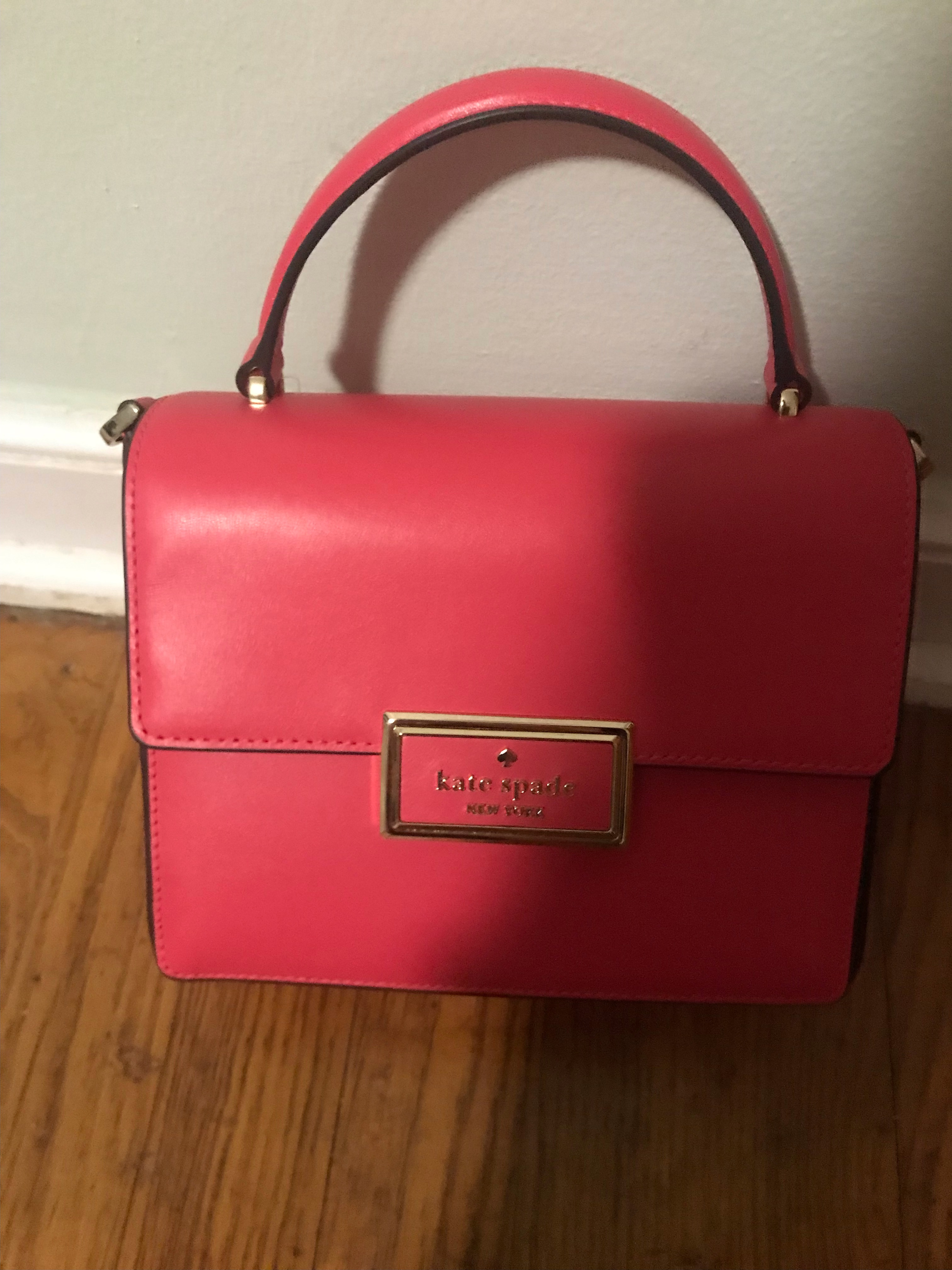
A pink bag from Kate Spade New York; long strap hidden behind bag.

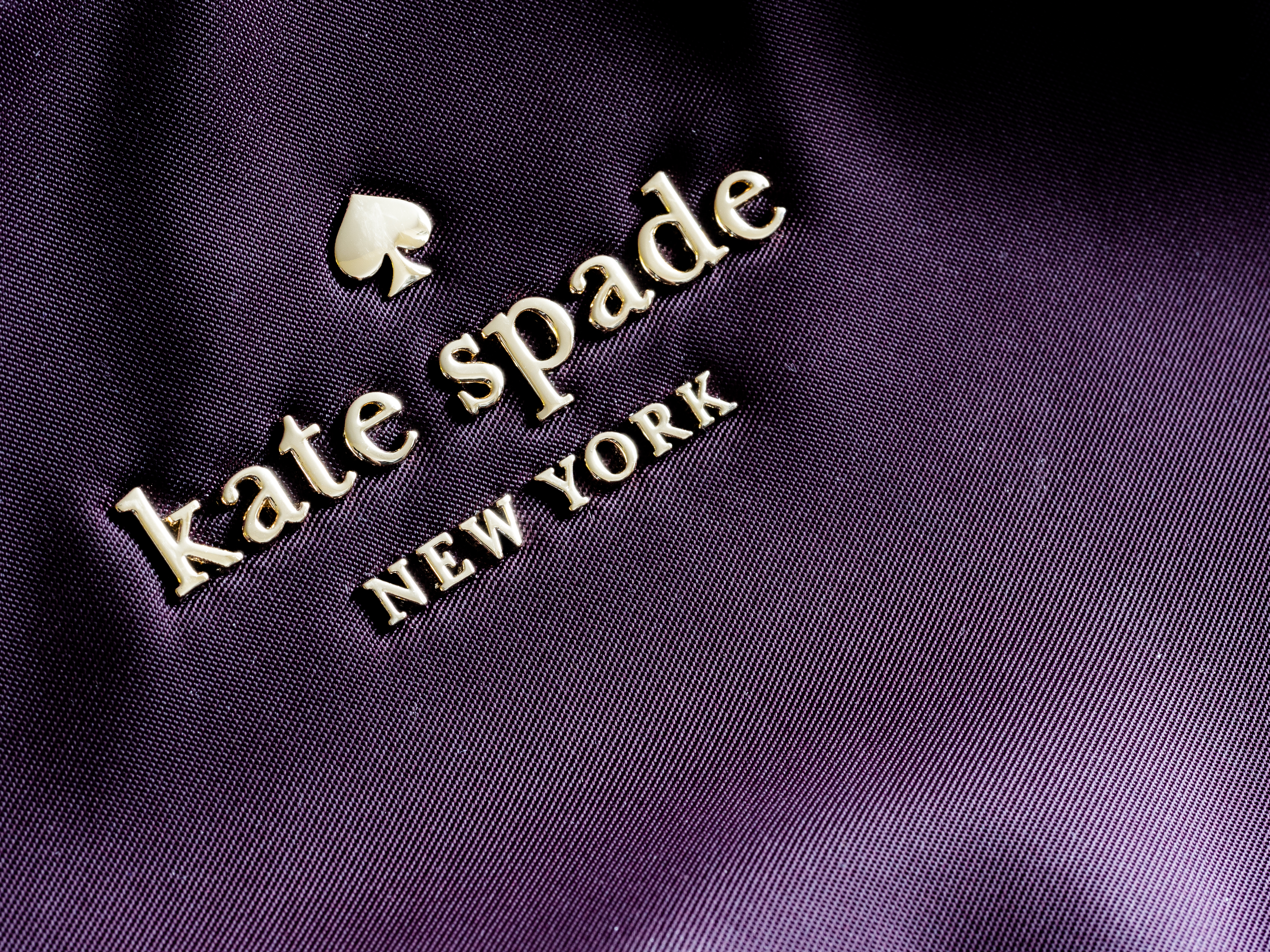
Application of the Kate Spade New York logo.

Kate Spade's first handbag was sold in January 1993. Shortly after the initial products were released, new collections came out containing glasses, jewelry, and other small accessories (winter 36). In 2007, "kate spade at home" was launched as a home collection brand. It features bedding, bath items, china, and various items for the home and wallpaper. In April 2013, Kate Spade New York launched a new fragrance called Live Colorfully. Previous perfumes of the house include Kate Spade from 2003 and Twirl from 2010. Live Colorfully is a fragrance made in-house that marks the 20th anniversary of the brand. Each of Spade's products sold are packaged, and each one has a card that gives a description of Kate and Andy's journey to the top.

Kate Spade New York competes with Michael Kors.

== Jack Spade ==
Jack Spade was the men's line of the Kate Spade brand, founded in 1999 by Andy Spade. The brand operated as an independent business with its own visual identity, website, e-commerce platform, and retail stores. For most of its twenty-three-year run, Jack Spade sold furnishings and accessories for men, including bags, small leather goods (such as wallets, passport holders, coin purses, and phone cases), apparel, watches, and technology-related items.

=== Brand identity and marketing ===
Jack Spade's design was minimalist and utilitarian, with an undercurrent of dry humor. Andy Spade compared the brand to a drop of mercury: "You can never put your finger on it. You can never figure it out."

Retail stores in the United States, United Kingdom, and Japan were designed by Steven Sclaroff, and were described as evoking "modern masculinity." A set of internal brand guidelines published in a 2009 blog post stated that "brand consistency is overrated." One of its five guiding principles was, "The brand doesn't have to look the same, but it has to feel the same".

Jack Spade ran a rotating series of themed concept shops under the "Jack Likes" campaign, each built around the interests of the imagined Jack Spade persona. In 2009, the Bleecker Street location became "Jack & Jimbo's Bike Shop," selling vintage bicycles and cycling gear alongside the brand's standard product line.

=== Bags ===
Jack Spade's bags were often identified by a small label sewn or embossed in a corner, reading "Jack Spade, Warren Street, New York" on early models and later simplified to "Jack Spade" or "Jack Spade, New York".

Bags were organized into named series, and staple lines like the Wayne duffel and Coal tote were reissued in various materials and finishes over time. The messenger bags had a single compartment with a flap closure secured by snaps or Velcro, in waxed canvas, nylon, or leather; the Tech Oxford Field Messenger combined suiting fabrics with functional detailing. The Wayne duffel, in leather, canvas, and nylon, had a simple silhouette, metal feet, and a detachable shoulder strap. The Coal bags, inspired by 1920s coal-carrying totes, were heavy-duty canvas designs later adapted with dipped color accents and reissued in suede, nylon, and leather.

=== Menswear ===
Jack Spade launched its first dedicated menswear line in 2006 under Irish designer Cuan Hanly, who had previously worked at Gieves & Hawkes and Paul Smith. His designs merged classic British tailoring with casual American sportswear.

Hanly said he tested design decisions against the question "Would Jack wear this?" The collections featured restrained design, quality fabrics, and subtle detailing, and expanded the brand beyond bags into shirts, trousers, outerwear, and knitwear.

=== Closure and phase-out ===
In January 2015, Kate Spade & Company announced plans to close all 12 Jack Spade retail stores, alongside its lower-priced line, Kate Spade Saturday, to focus on the primary Kate Spade New York brand. The closures included the flagship store on Warren Street in New York City and the boutique on Abbot Kinney Boulevard in Venice, California.

After the stores closed, Jack Spade sold through its website and retail partners. By November 2017, the standalone Jack Spade website had been phased out, and the brand's offerings were folded into a "Gifts for Him" selection on the Kate Spade New York website.
