= Kate Spade =

American fashion designer (1962–2018)

- Spade in 1999
- Born: Katherine Noel Brosnahan; December 24, 1962; Kansas City, Missouri, U.S.
- Died: June 5, 2018 (aged 55); New York City, U.S.
- Burial place: Calvary Cemetery, Kansas City, Missouri, U.S.
- Other name: Kate Valentine
- Education: Arizona State University
- Occupations: Fashion designer; businesswoman
- Years active: 1983–2018
- Known for: Kate Spade New York; Frances Valentine
- Spouse: Andy Spade (m. 1994)
- Children: 1
- Relatives: Rachel Brosnahan (niece)

Katherine Noel Valentine Brosnahan Spade (born Katherine Noel Brosnahan; December 24, 1962 – June 5, 2018) was an American fashion designer and entrepreneur. She was the co-founder and co-owner of the designer brand Kate Spade New York.

== Early life ==
Spade was born Katherine Noel Brosnahan on December 24, 1962, in Kansas City, Missouri, the daughter of June (née Mullen) and Francis (Frank) Brosnahan, who owned a road-construction company. She was of mostly Irish descent. After graduating from St. Teresa's Academy, an all-female Catholic high school located in the Brookside neighborhood of Kansas City, Spade attended the University of Kansas. She later transferred to Arizona State University. She joined the Kappa Kappa Gamma sorority and graduated with a journalism degree in 1985, thinking she would go into television production. While in college, she worked in sales at Carter's Men Shop, a men's clothing store in Phoenix, Arizona. One co-worker there was Andy Spade, who later became her husband and business partner.

== Career ==
=== Mademoiselle ===
By 1986, the couple had moved to Manhattan. Kate worked in the accessories department at Mademoiselle. She left Mademoiselle in 1991, achieving the rank of senior fashion editor and head of accessories. While working for Mademoiselle, she had noticed that the market lacked stylish, affordable, and sensible handbags, so decided to create her own.

=== Kate Spade New York ===
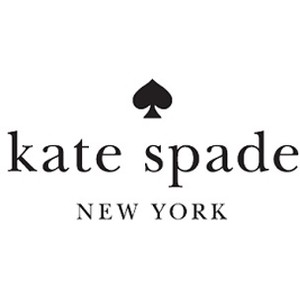
Kate Spade logo

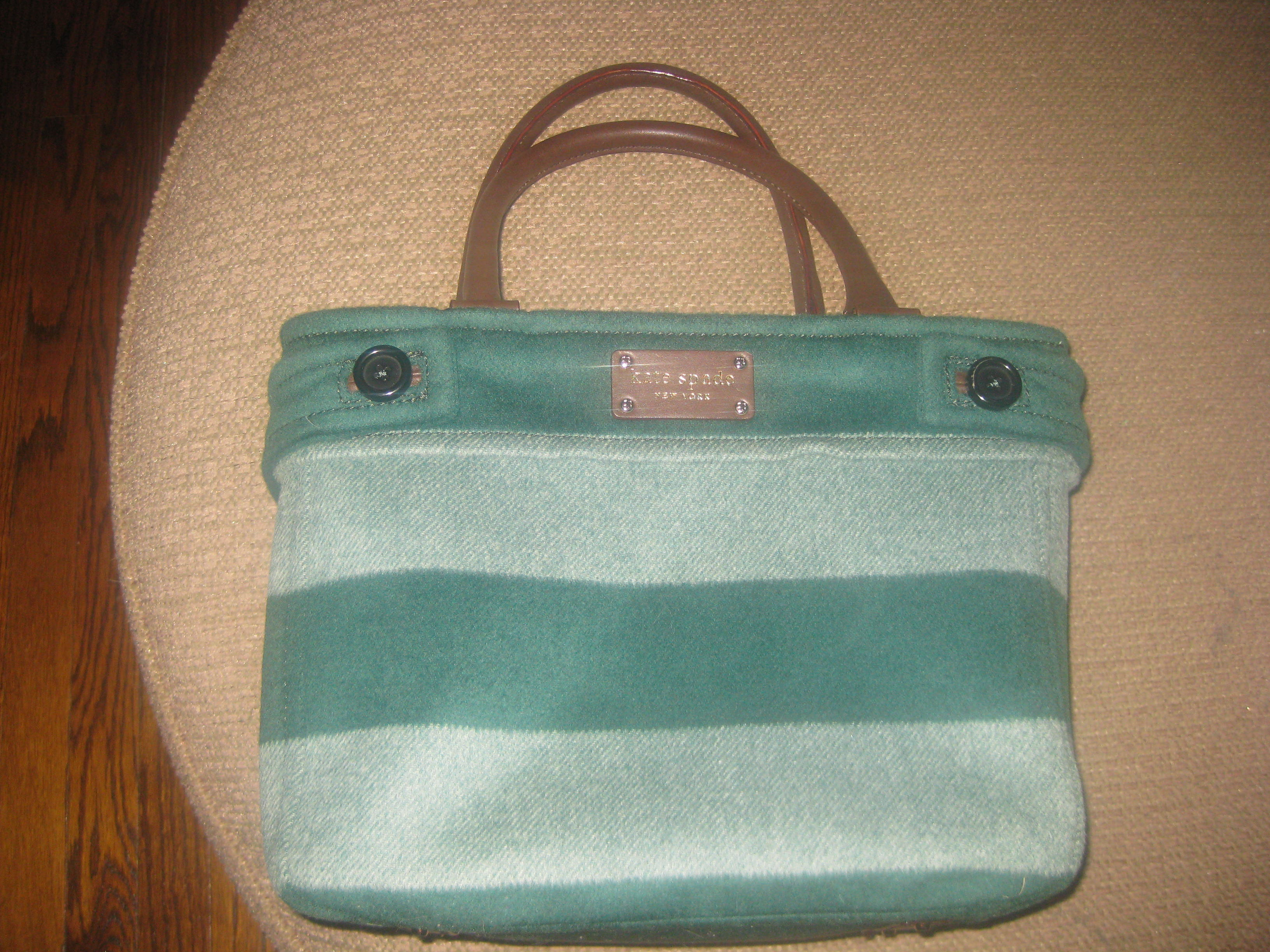
A Kate Spade handbag

Kate and Andy co-founded Kate Spade New York, along with Elyce Arons and Pamela Bell, in January 1993. Spade was initially undecided on the brand's name, because Andy and she had not yet married, and "Kate Brosnahan" seemed a cumbersome name for a fashion label. She considered a number of names, but agreed when Andy suggested "Kate Spade", as she would take the name Spade after their marriage.

Spade made six prototypes with Scotch tape and paper, and found a manufacturer in East New York willing to work with a startup to produce the bags. To finance the company, Andy, who had worked as a copywriter, withdrew his 401(k) pension plan and sometimes paid employees with personal checks. The couple spent their shipping season living at friends' apartments, because their own was filled with boxed handbags.

After an early show at the Javits Center at which the department-store chain Barneys ordered a few bags, Spade decided to put the bag's labels on the outside, a change that took her all night to alter, but established the brand.

The bags, priced in the US$150 to $450 range, quickly became popular, particularly in New York. That was "a real shift" in fashion, said Fern Mallis, director of the Council of Fashion Designers of America during the 1990s. "Everybody had Kate Spade bags. You could afford them, and happily buy more than one."

Young American women at the time also liked the bags' sophisticated look. One woman recalled that the Kate Spade bags looked "mature, without being too adult for a teenager," unlike higher-priced brands such as Burberry or Louis Vuitton. "At the turn of the last century, her bag came to encapsulate a decidedly Manhattan moment in time", a moment when Vogue editor-in-chief Anna Wintour recalled that it was impossible to walk a block in the city without seeing one.

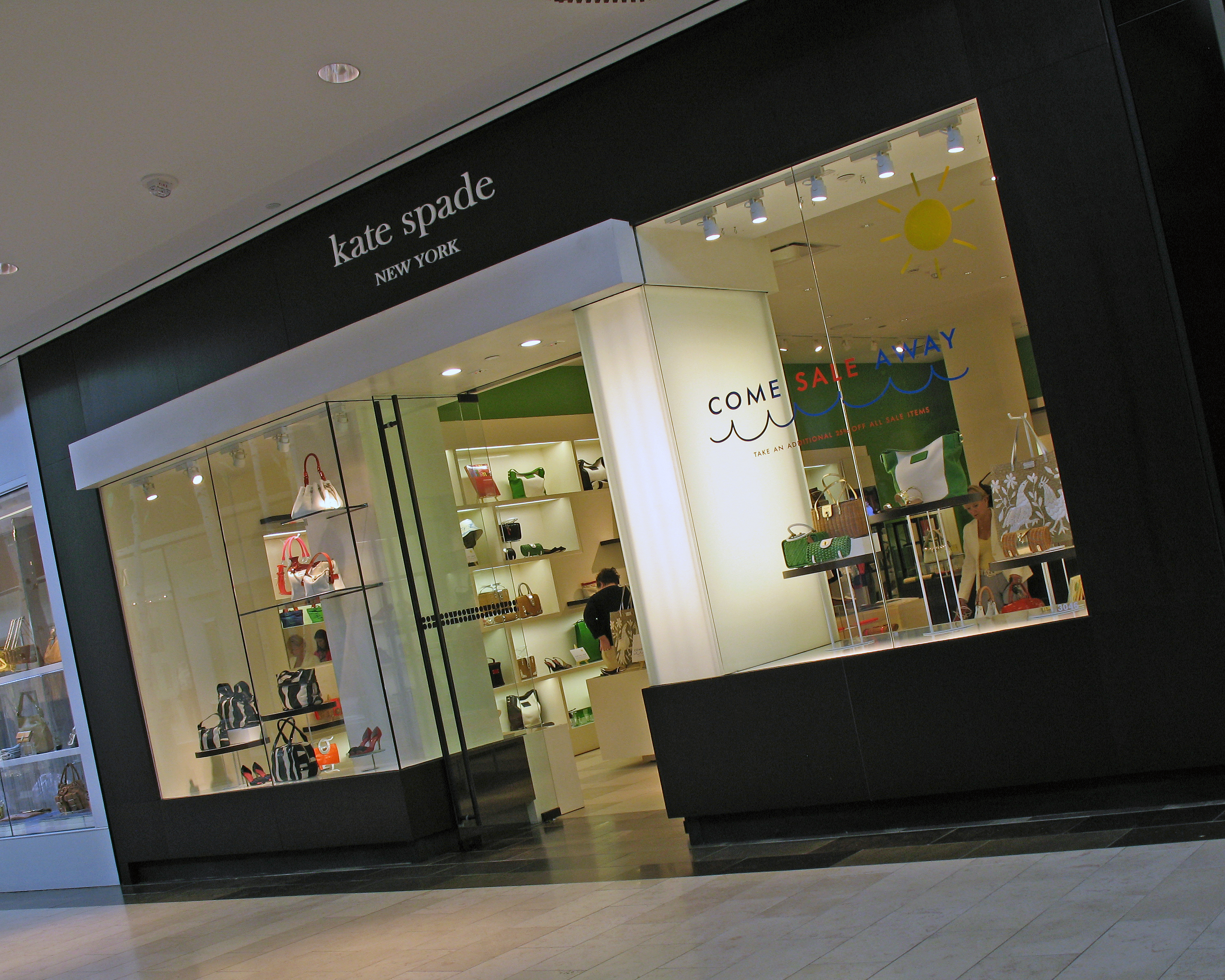
A Kate Spade New York store in the Natick Mall, Massachusetts, in 2008

The company exclusively sold handbags at first, but soon expanded to clothing, jewelry, shoes, stationery, eyewear, baby items, fragrances, and gifts. In 1996, the Kate Spade brand opened its first boutique, a 400-square-foot (37 m^{2}) shop in Manhattan's trendy SoHo district, and moved its headquarters into a 10,000-square-foot (930 m^{2}) space on West 25th Street.

Kate Spade also had two brand extensions called Kate Spade Saturday and Jack Spade. Kate Spade Saturday carried more casual handbags and apparel, but had heavy promotions and eventually closed in 2015. Jack Spade was a menswear line created by Kate Spade that offered men's leather goods and accessories, but that also closed in 2015.

In 1999, Spade sold a 56% stake in her business to Neiman Marcus Group, helping to expand the brand worldwide.

In 2004, "Kate Spade at Home" was launched as a home-collection brand. It featured bedding, bath items, china, wallpaper, table decor, flatware, and various decoration items. A Kate Spade store was opened in Aoyama, Tokyo, Japan.

Spade also published three books on the subjects of etiquette, entertainment, and fashion: Manners, Occasions, and Style, respectively.

By 2006, Spade had sold the remaining 44% of her shares to Neiman Marcus Group. The group sold the label in 2006 to Liz Claiborne Inc., for $124 million; it was later renamed Fifth & Pacific. The company was later purchased by Coach, Inc. in May 2017; both Coach and Kate Spade are now part of Tapestry, Inc.

=== Frances Valentine ===
After selling the remaining portion of her ownership in her brand, Spade took several years off to focus on her newborn daughter.

In 2016, she and Elyce Arons launched a new collection of luxury footwear and handbags under the brand name Frances Valentine. The name stemmed from a hybrid of family names; Frances is a family name on Spade's paternal side. "Valentine" was Spade's maternal grandfather's middle name, having been born on Valentine's Day. Spade later legally added Valentine to her full name.

After Spade's death, the brand released a collection of designs called "Love Katy" in her memory. Spade had several years' worth of designs and inspirations for the brand, and the company plans to launch them.

== Personal life ==
Spade married Andy Spade, a brother of actor and comedian David Spade, in 1994. While not legally separated, the couple had begun living apart a few months before her death. Kate Spade's friend and former business partner, Elyce Arons, published a memoir titled We Might Just Make It After All: My Best Friendship With Kate Spade. In it, Arons shares that Spade and Andy—though separated—were "trying to work things out" before her death in 2018. Their separation, lasting approximately ten months, was not final.

The couple's only child, a daughter, was born in 2005.

Actress Rachel Brosnahan is Spade's niece.

On April 11, 2002, Spade appeared as herself in an episode of Just Shoot Me!, "Blush Gets Some Therapy", season six episode nineteen, alongside her brother-in-law David Spade.

== Death ==
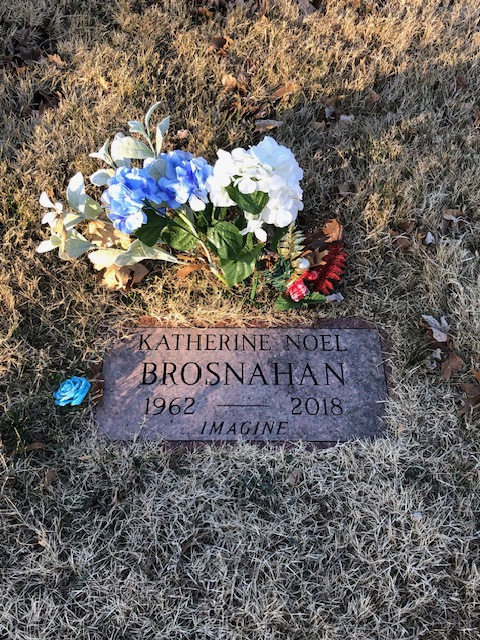
Kate Spade's grave in Kansas City, Missouri.

A housekeeper found Spade dead in her Manhattan apartment on June 5, 2018. Her death was ruled a suicide by hanging. Police reported that she had left a note addressed to her daughter. The day after his wife's death, Andy Spade released a statement:

Kate suffered from depression and anxiety for many years. She was actively seeking help and working closely with doctors to treat her disease, one that takes far too many lives. We were in touch with her the night before and she sounded happy. There was no indication and no warning that she would do this. It was a complete shock. And it clearly wasn't her. There were personal demons she was battling.

After Spade's death, her sister, Reta Saffo, told the media her suicide was "not unexpected". She believed Spade had suffered from bipolar disorder throughout her life, aggravated by the fame and wealth she achieved in her 30s. On several occasions, Reta had tried to convince her sister to get treatment, but Spade feared the stigma of mental illness would hurt her brand. Saffo suspected her sister had been contemplating suicide since actor Robin Williams hanged himself in 2014, media coverage of which, she claimed, captivated Spade. The last time Saffo had talked with her sister, she said, Spade had asked her to come to her funeral, even though she knew Saffo did not like going to those events. She insisted to Saffo that she was not considering suicide.

The rest of the family, who had not been close to Saffo for a decade, disputed this characterization. A source close to them told NBC News that they were "disgusted and saddened" at Saffo's remarks. "Her statement paints a picture of someone who did not know [Kate] at all." Spade's older brother, Earl Brosnahan, did allow that Spade had been the only one in the family who still spoke to Saffo, but only "sporadically". He nevertheless called Saffo's accounts "grossly inaccurate". Elyce Arons, one of her business partners, also recalled to The New York Times that she had on several occasions heard Spade say that she "would never do that" when news broke of a celebrity's suicide.

Following her death, the flagship Kate Spade New York store in Manhattan (and soon other stores nationwide) displayed a sign in its front window reading:

Kate Spade, the visionary founder of our brand, has passed. Our thoughts are with her family at this incredibly heartbreaking time. We honor all the beauty she brought into this world.

== Awards ==
In 1996, the Council of Fashion Designers of America awarded Spade "America's New Fashion Talent in Accessories" for her classic designs. In 1998, the organization again honored her for "Best Accessory Designer of the Year".

Her home collection won her three design awards in 2004: House Beautiful's "Giants of Design Award for Tastemaker", Bon Appétit's "American Food and Entertaining Award for Designer of the Year", and Elle Decor's "Elle Decor International Design Award for Bedding".

In 2017, she was inducted into the Entrepreneur Hall of Fame at the Henry W. Bloch School of Management at the University of Missouri, Kansas City.

Also in 2017, she was named one of the Most Creative People in Business by Fast Company.
