= Andy Spade =

American businessman (born 1962)

- Born: Andrew Spade; May 5, 1962 (age 64); Michigan, U.S.
- Occupation: Entrepreneur
- Known for: Co-founder of Partners & Spade and Kate Spade New York
- Spouse: Kate Spade (m. 1994; died 2018)
- Children: 1
- Relatives: David Spade (brother); Rachel Brosnahan (niece by marriage)

Andrew Spade (born May 5, 1962) is an American businessman. He co-founded the fashion brand Kate Spade New York with his wife, Kate Spade, as well as the design company Partners & Spade.

== Early life and education ==
Spade was born in Michigan, the middle child in a family of three brothers. His younger brother is actor and comedian David Spade. The family moved to Arizona when Andy was six. He attended Arizona State University, where he met his future wife. During college, he and a friend founded the advertising firm Spade & Hannawell, which was named one of Arizona's Top 10 New Companies in 1987.

== Career ==
Spade started his career in advertising, working on brands including Coca-Cola, Lexus, and Paul Stuart. He left his job in 1996 to work full-time on the business he and his wife had started.

=== Fashion ===
In 1993, he and his wife founded the fashion and lifestyle brand Kate Spade New York, and in 1999, the men's brand Jack Spade.

In 2013, he launched a collection of loungewear, Sleepy Jones, with Anthony Sperduti and Chad Buri.

=== Other endeavors ===
In 2008, Spade and Sperduti established Partners & Spade, a creative branding studio and storefront in the NoHo neighborhood of Manhattan. He also produced director Josh Safdie's debut feature film, The Pleasure of Being Robbed (2008), and has conceived and published several photography and concept books through such imprints as A.S. Books, Jack Spade Press, and Kate Spade Editions, as well as independently.

== Personal life ==
Spade was married to designer Kate Spade (née Brosnahan) from 1994 until her death on June 5, 2018. They had one daughter, born in February 2005. Actress Rachel Brosnahan is Spade's niece.

At the time of Kate's death by suicide, Andy released a statement acknowledging that the couple had been living separately, but close to each other, for the previous ten months, though they were not legally separated. Their daughter, then 13, lived with both of them. The statement said that Kate "suffered from depression and anxiety for many years" but had been seeking medical treatment.

== Awards ==
He was named one of 100 creative business people of 2009 by Fast Company.
