= Shrek – I Feel Good Animation Test =

1996 test animation by DreamWorks Animation

- Screenshot of the test
- Written by: J. J. Abrams
- Starring: Chris Farley; Tom Kenny
- Production company: The Propellerheads
- Release date: 1995
- Running time: 40 seconds
- Country: United States
- Language: English

Shrek – I Feel Good Animation Test is a 1995 American test animation by Propellerheads for DreamWorks Animation, which would become the basis of the 2001 animated fantasy comedy film Shrek. The animation test is set to James Brown's 1965 single "I Got You (I Feel Good)". Shrek's voice was provided by Chris Farley and Tom Kenny voices a mugger.

The test was a popular source of discussion in the animation community, and the lost media community, due to not being publicly available at the time. Originally, the test was held by an unknown eBay buyer who bought the test and several sculptures of the old Shrek model in 2014 via an auction that was opened by an employee named Tim Lawrence II. This provided the first screenshots of the test.

== Plot ==
Shrek is dancing in a medieval village at nighttime to the James Brown song "I Got You (I Feel Good)". A masked bandit jumps down from a building hanging on a rope to mug Shrek. The bandit threatens Shrek with a knife, but Shrek laughs at him, pulls on the bandit's rope, and sends the bandit flying into the sky. Shrek then resumes dancing.

== Production ==
During the early stages of Shrek's production, the film was a low-budget, grunge style that utilized motion capture and live-action set backgrounds that the CGI characters would be superimposed over. An animation crew known as the Propellerheads, consisting of J.J. Abrams, Andy Waisler, Rob Letterman and Loren Soman, were hired to create a test. During this time, there were talks of reducing the dark tone as it was thought not to appeal to a wide audience. The final film ended up compromising the dark tone for a more whimsical tone and was made using traditional computer animation.

== Reception and legacy ==
When it was presented to DreamWorks CEO Jeffrey Katzenberg and other officials in May 1997, Katzenberg disliked it, stating, "It looked terrible. It didn't work, it wasn't funny, and we didn't like it." The Propellerheads were consequently fired after the presentation.

A five-second snippet of the short was uploaded to YouTube on October 7, 2010, as part of animator Loren Soman's demo reel. He uploaded another clip on his Vimeo demo reel on December 16, 2011. These demo reels were found on August 14, 2022. Sped-up footage of the test from animator Anders J.L Beer was found by YouTube user DoofusManBoy on Vimeo. On September 15, 2023, a YouTube user named TheNormalGuy213 found more stills from the test. On November 23, 2023, production designer Barry E. Jackson released the test on his YouTube channel, The Zoom Art Studio, following an interview.
