= The Cable Guy =

1996 American film

- Theatrical release poster
- Directed by: Ben Stiller
- Written by: Lou Holtz Jr.
- Produced by: Judd Apatow; Andrew Licht; Jeffrey A. Mueller
- Starring: Jim Carrey; Matthew Broderick
- Cinematography: Robert Brinkmann
- Edited by: Steven Weisberg
- Music by: John Ottman
- Production companies: Columbia Pictures; Licht/Mueller Film Corporation
- Distributed by: Sony Pictures Releasing
- Release date: June 14, 1996
- Running time: 96 minutes
- Country: United States
- Language: English
- Budget: $47 million
- Box office: $102.8 million

The Cable Guy is a 1996 American black comedy psychological thriller film directed by Ben Stiller and written by Lou Holtz Jr. It stars Jim Carrey as an eccentric cable installer who intrudes on the life of a customer (Matthew Broderick). Leslie Mann, George Segal, Diane Baker and Jack Black appear in supporting roles. It was released in the United States by Sony Pictures Releasing on June 14, 1996. The film was a box office success, grossing $102.8 million against a $47 million budget, though not to the extent of many of Carrey's previous films. It received mixed reviews from critics, but developed a cult following.

== Plot ==
Steven Kovacs is an architect in Seattle. Steven recently proposed to his girlfriend Robin, who rejected his engagement. Steven temporarily separates from her, and moves into a new apartment alone. Steven decides to call a cable technician with a very severe speech disorder named Ernie "Chip" Douglas, to install cable television service in his apartment. Following his best friend Rick's advice, Steven bribes Chip to get free movie channels. Chip agrees to giving Steven free cable, only on one condition; Chip asks that Steven befriends him, and hangs out with him, to which Steven reluctantly agrees and accepts.

Steven and Chip bond, and develop their friendship. One night to visit to the city's central satellite dish, Chip confides to Steven that when he was young, his father was absent and his mother used television as a "babysitter", and Chip turned to television as his one theraputic outlet to deal with his personal problems. Chip is then revealed to be homeless, and living in his repair van. Chip now becoming obsessed with Steven, shows up uninvited to a basketball game that Steven is playing with his friends, and Chip starts to intentionally embarrass himself in front Steven's other friends. Stevens friends, especially Rick, distance themselves from Steve due to Chip's behavior at the basketball game.

Steven decides to side with his friends, and distances himself from Chip. However, one night while trying to patch things up, Steven invites Robin over to watch movies. Unfortunately, unbeknwost to Steven, Chip who is now stalking and harassing Steven, intentionally disables Steven's cable service. Steven decides to call Chip to fix his cable, in which Chip officially meets Robin. Steven begs and pleads for Chip to fix his cable, and again Chip has a condition that he will only do so, if Steven agrees to be his friend. Steven very reluctantly agrees.

Steven is starting to regret befriending Chip, and submitting to the blackmail that Chip is doing also. Chip takes Steven to Medieval Times dinner theatre, to where Steven is very uncomfortable there. Chip, who is friends with the employees at Medevial Times, arranged for him and Steven to participate a knight joust battle that is part of the show, without Stevens knowledge. However, shockingly Steven starts to enjoy Chip's weirdness, and their friendship turns for the better.

Chip gifts Steven a new expensive entertainment center, to thank him for being his friend. To return the thanks, Steven allows Chip to host a party at his apartment, in which majority of the guests are elderly customers of Chip. During the party, Steven has sex with a prostitute that Chip hired. Learning this the morning after, Steven is embarrassed if Robin finds out about him sleeping with the prositute woman, and angrily ejects Chip from his apartment, and once again Steven rejects Chip out of his life. To make amends, Chip tracks down and severely beats and fights Robin's new boyfriend in a restaurant bathroom, and warns him to stay away from her. Chip upgrades Robin's cable, and Chip lies and tells her the cable upgrade, is a gift from Steven. Robin gets back together with Steven as a result of this. However, when Steven finds out Chip's hand in their reunion, Steven is outraged, and personally confronts Chip to tell him to leave him alone.

Devastated, Chip sets out on a series of vengeful acts. He has Steven arrested for possession of stolen property, embarrasses him at a family gathering, and has him fired by transmitting a recording in which Steven insults his boss onto the company's computers. Chip also sarcastically "reveals" that his name is Larry Tate. Rick who was suspicious of Chip, runs an investigative background check on him. Rick informs Steven of the information he found out about Chip, and tells Steven that Chip was fired from the cable company for using fake names derived from sitcoms, and stalking customers. Steven receives a phone call from Chip, who tells him he is paying Robin a visit, making Steven rush to Robin's apartment. Finding it empty, Steven calls the police and tells them to hurry to where Chip has taken her: the central satellite dish.

Arriving at the satellite dish first, Steven rescues Robin from Chip, who, as the police arrive, climbs to the top of the dish proclaiming that he must "kill the babysitter" to prevent others from becoming like him. He falls into the dish and cuts the television signal to the entire city, but survives. He apologizes to Steven for being a bad friend; Steven forgives him and asks for his real name, which he says is Ricky Ricardo. As he is airlifted away, one of the paramedics addresses him as "buddy"; when he asks if that's true and the paramedic confirms it, Chip smiles deviously, thinking he has found a new "friend".

== Cast ==
- Jim Carrey as the Cable Guy/Ernie "Chip" Douglas
- Matthew Broderick as Steven Kovacs
- Leslie Mann as Robin Harris
- Jack Black as Rick Legatos
- George Segal as Mr. Kovacs
- Diane Baker as Mrs. Kovacs
- Ben Stiller as Sam and Stan Sweet
- Eric Roberts as Eric Roberts
- Janeane Garofalo as Melinda, the Medieval Times's "serving wench"
- Andy Dick as Medieval Host
- Harry O'Reilly as Hal, Steven's boss
- David Cross as Sales Manager
- Amy Stiller as Steven's Secretary
- Owen Wilson as Robin's Date
- Tommy Hinkley, Shawn Michael Howard, Jeff Kahn, Suli McCullough and Joel Murray as Basketball Players
- Kathy Griffin as Cable Boy's mother
- Paul Greco as Raul
- Misa Koprova as Heather
- Aki Aleong, Dona Hardy and Sean Whalen as Party Guests
- Cynthia Lamontagne as Restaurant Hostess
- Charles Napier and Christopher Michael as Arresting Officers
- Charles Knox Robinson, III as Steven's Lawyer
- John O'Donohue as Prison Guard
- Emilio Rivera as Jail Inmates
- Bob Odenkirk as Steven's Brother
- Annabelle Gurwitch as Steven's Sister-In-Law
- Julie Hayden as Steven's Sister
- Blake Boyd as Steven's Brother-In-Law
- Tabitha Soren as Tabitha Soren
- Rikki Klieman as Rikki Klieman
- Conrad Janis as Father ("Double Trouble")
- Christine Devine as Anchor Woman
- Wendy Walsh as Reporter Outside Courtroom
- Kyle Gass as Couch Potato
- David Bowe as Helicopter Paramedic
- Mark Fite as Medieval Times knight (uncredited)
- Alex D. Linz as Tony (uncredited)

== Production ==
First-time screenwriter Lou Holtz Jr. conceived The Cable Guy while working as a prosecutor in Los Angeles, declaring that he once saw a cable company employee in the hallway of his mother's apartment building and started thinking, "What's he doing here so late?" The screenplay became the subject of a bidding war, won by Columbia Pictures, at a price of $750,000, plus a $250,000 additional bonus if the movie were made. The role of the Cable Guy was originally sold with Chris Farley attached to star, but he later dropped out due to scheduling difficulties. Adam Sandler was also considered.

Jim Carrey received $20 million, then a record amount, to star. Following Carrey's signing, Columbia Pictures hired Judd Apatow to produce. Columbia rebuffed Apatow's interest in directing, but accepted his suggestion to invite Ben Stiller, on whose Ben Stiller Show Apatow had worked. Stiller was considered to play the Steven Kovacs character before it was offered to Matthew Broderick.

The original screenplay by Lou Holtz Jr. was a lighter comedy, described by Apatow as "a What About Bob? annoying friend movie," where the Cable Guy was a likeable loser who intrudes upon the cable subscriber's life, but never in a physically threatening way. Carrey, Apatow and Stiller liked the setup of "somebody who is really smart with technology invading somebody's life," and opted to add slapstick and darker tones, changing into a satire of thrillers such as Cape Fear, Unlawful Entry and The Hand That Rocks the Cradle. The dialogue would also fit Carrey's style of comedy.

Holtz wrote four additional drafts, each one darker than the previous, before leaving the project and giving Apatow the opportunity to take over the writing. Apatow and Stiller visited Carrey as he was filming Ace Ventura: When Nature Calls in South Carolina, and over a few days, riffed a lot of the set pieces that were added to the script, and further explored how Carrey wanted to perform the character. Apatow took the film to the Writers Guild for arbitration to get a writing credit but ultimately Holtz retained sole credit for the script. Apatow expressed frustration at not getting credit but acknowledged that as he was also a producer on the film, the Writers Guild requirements are set very high to protect writers.

The final script had elements so disturbing that Columbia heard many complaints regarding certain scenes. In turn, Apatow declared that the studio did not specifically order removals, "but we took [the scenes] out as part of the natural evolution of our creative process". Stiller stated that he shot every scene with "a dark version and a light version", and that he was surprised that the studio did not object to the violent ending.

The fight sequence at Medieval Times between Chip (Jim Carrey) and Steven (Matthew Broderick) is an homage to the Star Trek episode "Amok Time"—including the use of Vulcan weapons (lirpa), the dialogue, and the background music. Director Ben Stiller is an admitted Trekkie. Actor Charles Napier guest-starred in the Star Trek: The Original Series episode "The Way to Eden".

== Release ==
=== Box office ===
The Cable Guy grossed $19,806,226 on its opening weekend, ranking number one ahead of The Rock. At the time, it had the highest opening weekend for a Ben Stiller film, holding this record until 2000 when Meet the Parents surpassed it. It grossed a total $60,240,295 in the North American domestic market, and $42,585,501 outside the United States, making a total of $102,825,796 worldwide gross, but failed to reach domestic projected numbers Jim Carrey brought to his previous movies. Apatow said "people looked at it as a failure because it didn't make even more money." Despite the critical perception that the movie was a disappointment, it made a profit in excess of its $47 million production budget. The film was released in the United Kingdom on July 12, 1996, and opened on #2, behind Mission: Impossible.

=== Home media ===
The film was released on VHS on December 3, 1996, DVD on September 15, 1997, and a 15th anniversary Blu-ray release on March 1, 2011. Sony re-issued the latter format as a manufacture-on-demand title on December 17, 2019.

== Reception ==
On review aggregator Rotten Tomatoes, The Cable Guy holds an approval rating of 57% based on 84 reviews, with an average rating of 5.9/10. The website's critical consensus states, "The Cable Guy's dark flashes of thought-provoking, subversive wit are often—but not always—enough to counter its frustratingly uneven storytelling approach." On Metacritic, the film received a weighted average score of 56 based on 28 reviews, indicating "mixed or average reviews". Audiences surveyed by CinemaScore gave the film a grade "C+" on scale of A to F.

The Cable Guy has been regarded as having a darker tone than most of Carrey's previous work. While the character may seem goofy at first, similar to previous Carrey roles, he later turns more sinister and scary. Audiences and film critics had mixed reactions to the change. The film was on J. Hoberman's Top 10 best of the year. Roger Ebert included The Cable Guy in his worst of the year list for 1996, though colleague Gene Siskel disagreed, calling it "a very good film. [Carrey's] best since The Mask". Ebert found Carrey's "bizarre" and "creepy" performance undermined the entire story, and felt the movie was more of a dark comedy than was necessary. Slant Magazine named his role one the "15 Famous Movie Psychopaths".

In spite of its mixed reception, the film has achieved a cult following, and has been credited for helping Carrey pursue more serious roles such as The Truman Show and Eternal Sunshine of the Spotless Mind. Carrey named the movie one of his favorites that he worked on:

I have odd favorites that may not be for kids, but The Cable Guy is one of my favorite movies. I think Ben Stiller did an amazing job, and it's populated with the greatest comedy actors of our day when they were just coming into their power. I love that character. That character is all of us: we were all raised by the TV.

Stiller calls The Cable Guy the "most educational and spirit-building" failure of his career. Despite its initial flop, he says, "the making of it was a pure creative experience" thanks to Carrey's boldness: "It was pretty shocking, mainly because I never experienced such a high-profile project not doing well." But the experience taught him invaluable lessons: "You learn that it sometimes goes well and it sometimes doesn't. I have found it [has a life], more so than other movies I made that were more 'successful.'"

== Accolades ==
| Award | Category | Recipient | Result | Ref. |
|---|---|---|---|---|
| Kids' Choice Awards | Favorite Movie Actor | Jim Carrey | Won | |
| MTV Movie Awards | Best Comic Performance | Jim Carrey | Won | |
| MTV Movie Awards | Best Villain | Jim Carrey | Won | |
| MTV Movie Awards | Best Fight | Jim Carrey and Matthew Broderick | Nominated | |
| Stinkers Bad Movie Awards | Most Painfully Unfunny Comedy | | Nominated | |

== Soundtrack ==
Professional ratings
Review scores
| Source | Rating |
|---|---|
| AllMusic | 2/5 stars |
| Los Angeles Times | 3/4 stars |

The Cable Guy: Original Motion Picture Soundtrack was released on May 21, 1996, via Work Group. It consists of previously unreleased songs, largely of alternative rock and heavy metal bands, and includes the first solo recording by Jerry Cantrell of Alice in Chains fame. The soundtrack includes Jim Carrey's version of Jefferson Airplane's "Somebody to Love" which was performed by him in the film. It also includes a song from $10,000 Gold Chain, a side project of Pearl Jam lead guitarist Mike McCready. White Zombie's "More Human than Human" is featured in a dramatic scene of the film but was not included on the soundtrack release.

Cantrell's "Leave Me Alone" served as the soundtrack's promotional vehicle and was released as a single, peaking at No. 14 on Billboard's Mainstream Rock Tracks chart. It had a music video that featured various footage from Cable Guy in a dark manner typical of Cantrell's style. It also had Jim Carrey's haunting face reaching out of a television screen observing Cantrell. The music video was included as a bonus feature on the 15th-anniversary edition Blu-ray of The Cable Guy in 2011.

While the album as a whole was not well received, Stephen Thomas Erlewine of AllMusic noted that "Leave Me Alone" positively "rocks as hard as any Alice in Chains track". The track "Standing Outside a Broken Phone Booth with Money in My Hand" gained popularity for its appearance in the film and reached No. 1 on the Billboard Alternative Songs chart in 1996.

=== Track listing ===
| No. | Title | Writer(s) | Producer(s) | Length |
|---|---|---|---|---|
| 1. | "I'll Juice You Up" (performed by Jim Carrey) | | | 0:29 |
| 2. | "Leave Me Alone" (performed by Jerry Cantrell) | Jerry Cantrell | Jerry Cantrell; Toby Wright | 5:13 |
| 3. | "Standing Outside a Broken Phone Booth with Money in My Hand" (performed by Primitive Radio Gods) | Chris O'Connor; Jane Feather; Leonard Feather | Chris O'Connor | 4:34 |
| 4. | "Blind" (performed by Silverchair) | Daniel Johns; Ben Gillies | Nick Launay; Silverchair | 4:14 |
| 5. | "Oh! Sweet Nuthin'" (performed by $10,000 Gold Chain) | Lou Reed | Brett Eliason | 6:11 |
| 6. | "End of the World Is Coming" (performed by David Hilder) | David Hilder | Jim Mitchell | 3:09 |
| 7. | "Satellite of Love" (performed by Porno for Pyros) | Reed | Perry Farrell | 3:41 |
| 8. | "Get Outta My Head" (performed by Cracker) | David Lowery; Johnny Hickman | David Lowery; Dennis Herring | 2:04 |
| 9. | "Somebody to Love" (performed by Jim Carrey) | Darby Slick | Jim Mitchell | 3:43 |
| 10. | "The Last Assassin" (performed by Cypress Hill) | Louis Freese; Lawrence Muggerud | DJ Muggs | 3:49 |
| 11. | "This Is" (performed by Ruby) | Lesley Rankine; Mark Walk | Mark Walk | 3:54 |
| 12. | "Hey Man Nice Shot" (performed by Filter) | Richard Patrick | Brian Liesegang; Richard Patrick | 5:20 |
| 13. | "Unattractive" (performed by Toadies) | Vaden Todd Lewis | Paul Leary | 3:51 |
| 14. | "Download" (performed by Expanding Man) | Aaron Lippert; Bill Guerra; Christopher Hancock; Dave Wanamaker; Peter Armata | Mike Denneen | 4:12 |
| 15. | "This Concludes Our Broadcast Day" (performed by John Ottman) | John Ottman | John Ottman; Steve Fitzmaurice | 4:24 |
| Total length: | | | | 58:48 |

== Other media ==
Carrey reprised the role of the Cable Guy in 2022 as part of a Verizon commercial that aired during Super Bowl LVI.
