= How Blue Can You Get =

Blues song popularized by B.B. King

Single by B.B. King
- B-side: "Please Accept My Love"
- Released: 1964
- Genre: Blues
- Length: 2:40
- Label: ABC-Paramount
- Songwriters: Jane Feather, Leonard Feather
- Producer: Sid Feller

B.B. King singles chronology
"How Do I Love You" (1963)	"How Blue Can You Get" (1964)	"Rock Me Baby" (1964)

"How Blue Can You Get" (alternatively "Downhearted") is a blues song first recorded by Johnny Moore's Three Blazers in 1949. It is a slow twelve-bar blues that jazz critic Leonard Feather and his wife, Jane Feather, are credited with writing. The song has been recorded by several blues and other artists. It was a hit for B.B. King in 1964 and became a staple of his live shows.

== Earlier songs ==
In 1949, Johnny Moore with his brother, Oscar Moore, on guitars, Billy Valentine on piano and vocal, and Johnny Miller on bass recorded "How Blue Can You Get" in the West Coast blues-style. It was included on the jazz and blues compilation album Singin' the Blues (1960). Feather described the song as having "the type of intimate instrumental setting heard in so many best blues vocal performances of the 1940s". In 1951, Louis Jordan recorded the song using a big band arrangement.

== B.B. King versions ==
B.B. King first recorded the song as "Downhearted", which was included on his 1963 Blues in My Heart album. The song is performed at "a steady, stately pace, its groove punctuated by B.B.'s stinging runs and wailing, sustained notes", according to King biographer David McGee. King later re-recorded the song as "How Blue Can You Get" and ABC-Paramount Records released it as a single in 1964. It "stood out, thanks to the relative simplicity of its arrangement, and the caustic humor of the lyrics". McGee adds that the remake featured "more propulsion from the horn section, and B.B. investing his vocal with far more outrage than can be detected on the laidback original". It also added a "vehement stop-time interlude":

I gave you a brand new Ford, you said 'I want a Cadillac'
I bought you a ten dollar dinner, you said 'Thanks for the snack'
I let you live in my penthouse, you said it was just a shack
I gave you seven children, and now you want to give them back

"How Blue Can You Get" reached number 97 on the Billboard Hot 100 chart in 1964 (the magazine's R&B chart was suspended at the time). The song became a fixture in King's live shows "with enough good punchlines for B.B. to keep it in his act for decades". A live version of the song first appeared on the Live at the Regal album recorded in Chicago in 1964; King prefaced it with "pay attention to the lyrics, not so much to my singing or the band". Since then, live versions of the song have been included on several live B.B. King albums, such as Live in Cook County Jail, Live in Japan, and the expanded Get Yer Ya-Ya's Out! The Rolling Stones in Concert.

In 1998, B. B. King, billed as "Malvern Gasperone", performed the song as part of a fictional group, the Louisiana Gator Boys, in the film Blues Brothers 2000. This fictional group was played by 22 legendary and well-known real-world musicians such as Eric Clapton, Bo Diddley, Lou Rawls, Clarence Clemons, Isaac Hayes, Koko Taylor, Travis Tritt, and Steve Winwood. The song is included on the soundtrack album.

== Primitive Radio Gods sampling ==
In 1996, Primitive Radio Gods sampled the line "I've been downhearted baby, ever since the day we met" from King's version on the album Live in Cook County Jail for the chorus of their single "Standing Outside a Broken Phone Booth with Money in My Hand", which became a record chart hit. In a review for AllMusic, Stephen Thomas Erlewine commented "With its loping, unthreatening hip-hop beats and its looped B.B. King sample, 'Standing' had all the appeal of an adult novelty for most listeners – it was something that was out of the ordinary, to be sure, but not something that you would want to investigate much further."
