= Out Alive =

Studio album by Primitive Radio Gods
- Released: August 16, 2010
- Recorded: 2009–2010
- Genre: Alternative rock, psychedelic rock, shoegazing
- Length: 54:41
- Label: Independent
- Producer: Primitive Radio Gods

Primitive Radio Gods chronology
Sweet Venus (2006)	Out Alive (2010)	Manmade Sun (2016)

Out Alive is Primitive Radio Gods' fifth album, the third of such released independently and exclusively through their official website. Unlike their previous album, Sweet Venus, which was only available in MP3 format, Out Alive was released in a limited edition CD slipcase, but only 35 copies were available for purchase from their web site. A second run, in digipak format featuring new cover art by guitarist Luke McAuliffe, was released in August 2012.

== Track listing ==
No.	Title	Writer(s)	Length
1.	"The Long Goodbye"	Chris O'Connor	5:53
2.	"Stranger to Self"	O'Connor	4:34
3.	"Only Way Through"	O'Connor	3:51
4.	"Protokult"	O'Connor	3:34
5.	"Uniglory"	O'Connor	4:37
6.	"Repairing the Sky and Similar Feats of Strength"	Luke McAuliffe	2:14
7.	"Somewhere Inside the Oakland Heights"	O'Connor	5:28
8.	"To Catch the Light"	McAuliffe	2:31
9.	"Hard Rain Soft Skin"	O'Connor	4:37
10.	"Three Small Blue Lights"	McAuliffe	4:24
11.	"Metropolitan Vengeance"	O'Connor	3:22
12.	"Can I"	McAuliffe	6:00
13.	"Thor on the Floor"	O'Connor, McAuliffe, Tim Lauterio	3:40
Total length:			54:43

=== Notes ===
- "To Catch the Light" and "Can I" were referred to as "Unkind Light" and "Into the Blue" respectively on the first edition sleeve and in social media before the album's release, but appear under the given title on the first edition disc and consistently throughout the second edition packaging.
- "Hard Rain Soft Skin" contains a lyrical allusion to "Children of the Helmet Law" from Still Electric.
- "Three Small Blue Lights" is an extension of a musical interlude in the track "Whatever Wakes McCool" from White Hot Peach.
