= Chris Farley =

American comedian and actor (1964–1997)

- Farley in 1982
- Born: Christopher Crosby Farley; February 15, 1964; Madison, Wisconsin, U.S.
- Died: December 18, 1997 (aged 33); Chicago, Illinois, U.S.
- Resting place: Resurrection Cemetery
- Education: Marquette University
- Occupations: Actor; comedian
- Years active: 1984–1997
- Relatives: John Farley (brother); Kevin Farley (brother); Jim Farley (cousin)

Christopher Crosby Farley (February 15, 1964 – December 18, 1997) was an American actor and comedian. Farley was a member of Chicago's Second City Theatre and later a cast member of the NBC sketch comedy show Saturday Night Live for five seasons, from 1990 to 1995. He went on to pursue a film career, appearing in films such as Airheads, Tommy Boy, Black Sheep, Beverly Hills Ninja, and Almost Heroes.

Influenced by John Belushi, Farley was widely known for his physical performance/comedy and athleticism (similar to Curly Howard and Roscoe Arbuckle). This was used to great effect during his time on Saturday Night Live, and continued through many of his films. From his early acting days, and through the height of his fame, Farley struggled with mental health problems, obesity, alcoholism, and substance abuse. He died of a drug overdose in 1997 at the age of 33.

== Early life ==
Christopher Crosby Farley was born in Madison, Wisconsin, on February 15, 1964 to an Irish-American family, and grew up in Maple Bluff. His father Thomas John Farley Sr. owned an oil company and his mother Mary Anne (née Crosby) was a homemaker. He had four siblings: Tom Jr., Kevin, John, and Barbara. His cousin Jim is the current CEO of Ford Motor Company. Farley attended parochial schools in Madison, including Edgewood High School of the Sacred Heart. According to Joel Murray, a fellow Second City cast member, Farley would "always make it to Mass."

Many of his summers were spent as a camper and counselor at Red Arrow Camp, near Minocqua, Wisconsin. He graduated from Marquette University in 1986, with a double major in communications and theatre. At Marquette, he played rugby union and discovered a love of comedy. After college, he worked with his father at the Scotch Oil Company in Madison. He first learned the art of improvisational comedy at the Ark Improv Theatre in Madison.

Farley made his way to Chicago, performing first at Improv Olympic. He then attended Chicago's Second City Theatre, starting the same day as Stephen Colbert, initially as part of Second City's touring group. He was eventually promoted to their main stage in 1989, and was a cast member of three revues, The Gods Must Be Lazy, It Was Thirty Years Ago Today, and Flag Smoking Permitted in Lobby Only or Censorama. Farley also auditioned for a role as a Mall Santa in Home Alone, but he wasn't what director Chris Columbus was looking for.

== Career ==
=== 1990–1995: Saturday Night Live ===
Along with Chris Rock, Farley was one of the new Saturday Night Live cast members announced in early 1990. On SNL, Farley frequently collaborated with fellow cast members Chris Rock, Adam Sandler, Tim Meadows, and David Spade. This group came to be known as the "Bad Boys of SNL."

Popular characters performed by Farley included Matt Foley, an over-the-top motivational speaker who frequently reminded other characters that he was "living in a van down by the river!" The character was created by Bob Odenkirk when he and Farley were performers at Second City. The character's name came from a longtime friend of Farley's who became a Catholic priest and was a pastor at St. James Catholic Church in Arlington Heights, Illinois. In early renditions of the character, Farley used other names, depending on whom he knew in the audience, until the real-life Foley went to the show and had his name used, at which point Farley felt the name best suited the character and refused to change it. Some of the mannerisms of the character were a combination of the positions Farley noticed his rugby teammates took on the pitch coupled with his high school football coach's habit of squatting down when giving pep talks and the voice his father used when he was angry.

Other famous Farley characters included Todd O'Connor of Bill Swerski's Superfans, a group of stereotypical Chicagoans who repeatedly shouted "da Bears!"; a would-be Chippendales dancer, in a famous sketch that paired him with guest host Patrick Swayze; one of the "Gap Girls", who worked together at a local mall; a stereotypical lunch lady, to the theme of "Lunchlady Land"' performed by Adam Sandler; Bennett Brauer, a Weekend Update commentator who often divulged his personal and hygienic problems via air quotes; and himself on The Chris Farley Show, a talk show in which Farley "interviewed" the guest with poorly conceived questions or trailed off about subjects not germane to the guest.

Some of these characters were brought to SNL from his days at Second City. Farley also performed impersonations of Tom Arnold (who gave Farley's eulogy at his private funeral), Jerry Garcia, Meat Loaf, Norman Schwarzkopf, Dom DeLuise, Roger Ebert, Carnie Wilson, Newt Gingrich, Mindy Cohn, Mama Cass, Hank Williams Jr., and Rush Limbaugh.

Off-screen, Farley was well known for his pranks in the offices of Saturday Night Live. Sandler and Farley would make late-night prank phone calls from the SNL offices in Rockefeller Center, with Sandler speaking in an old woman's voice and Farley farting into the phone and mooning cars from a limousine, and even once defecating out a 17th floor window. He was also known to frequently get naked and do various stunts for laughs, including imitating Jame "Buffalo Bill" Gumb from the then-current film The Silence of the Lambs. Chris Rock once claimed that he probably saw Farley's genitals more than Farley's girlfriend did. Farley, alongside Sandler, was fired by NBC in 1995.

=== 1991–1997: Film career ===
During his time on SNL, Farley appeared in the comedy films Wayne's World, Wayne's World 2, Coneheads, Airheads, and had an uncredited role in Billy Madison. He also appeared in the music video for the Red Hot Chili Peppers single "Soul to Squeeze", which was featured on the soundtrack to Coneheads.

After Farley and most of his fellow cast members were released from their contracts at Saturday Night Live following the 1994–95 season, Farley began focusing on his film career. In his first two major films, Tommy Boy and Black Sheep, he starred with SNL colleague and close friend David Spade. These were a success at the domestic box office, earning around $32 million each and gaining a large cult following on home video. The two films established Farley as a relatively bankable star, and he was given the title role of Beverly Hills Ninja, which finished in first place at the box office on its opening weekend.

Farley was particularly dissatisfied with Black Sheep, an attempt by the studio to recapture the chemistry in Tommy Boy, and which was only 60 pages into the script when the project was green-lit. As a result, he relapsed on the night of the premiere, which required further rehab before he could begin work on Beverly Hills Ninja. His final completed films — Almost Heroes and Dirty Work — were posthumously released in May and June 1998, respectively.

=== 1996–2022: Unfinished projects ===
Farley was originally cast as the voice of the title character in the animated film Shrek (2001), recording 85% (or 95% by some accounts) of the character's dialogue, but he died just before the voice-over was completed. Farley's former SNL castmate Mike Myers replaced him in the role, and insisted Shrek's lines be rewritten. A story reel and animation test featuring a sample of Farley as Shrek was released in 2015 and 2022 respectively. The original version of Shrek was more like Farley himself, according to his brother. Additionally, in Dana Carvey and David Spade's podcast Fly on the Wall tribute episode to the 25th anniversary of Chris's death, John Farley said he had been approached by the studio to complete Chris's lines due to his voice sounding almost identical to his brother's. While lamenting he wished he had completed the film for Chris, John admitted he just could not bring himself to do it at the time, even though Chris had five days left of line readings.

Farley was slated for another voice role in Dinosaur (2000) as a young male Brachiosaurus named Sorbus who, despite his gigantic stature, was frightened of heights. After his death, the character was rewritten as Baylene, an elderly female Brachiosaurus voiced by Joan Plowright.

At the time of his death, Farley had been in talks to co-star with Vince Vaughn in The Gelfin, and to star in a biographical film about comedian Fatty Arbuckle to be written by David Mamet. Jim Carrey's role in the 1996 film The Cable Guy was originally intended for Farley, but scheduling conflicts forced him to decline. Farley was also offered the role of Ishmael (eventually played by Randy Quaid) in Kingpin, though he was forced by Paramount to turn it down to honor his commitment to star in Black Sheep.

Farley was slated to appear in a third Ghostbusters film, which was at the time intended to be about a new trio of Ghostbusters taking on overpopulation in Hell. Dav Pilkey, author of the children's book series Captain Underpants, had wanted Farley to play the title role in a potential live-action television series based on the books.

Farley had been in talks for the lead in an adaptation of the novel A Confederacy of Dunces. Farley even expressed interest in portraying Atuk in an adaptation of the novel The Incomparable Atuk. Both of these shelved projects, along with the Arbuckle biopic, have been alleged to be cursed as Farley, John Belushi, and John Candy were each attached to both roles, and all three died before any of the films entered production.

Two months before his death, Farley had a conversation with Spade about a hypothetical third film that would have starred the duo (based on the box office successes of Tommy Boy and Black Sheep). Although nothing was ever formalized, director Stephen Surjik developed a script for a film named Tree with both Farley and Spade in mind. The plot was described as "...involving a low-level White House employee who goes to the Pacific Northwest in search of a presidential Christmas tree. The White House staffer hooks up with a quirky truck driver and hijinks ensue", presumably with Spade as the White House employee and Farley as the truck driver.

== Personal life ==
For most of his adult life, Farley battled alcoholism and substance use disorder. These addictions resulted in him being suspended from the cast of Saturday Night Live. Producer Lorne Michaels had little patience for Farley's drug use (having had similar problems with John Belushi) and threatened to dismiss Farley permanently if he refused to obtain help. Bernie Brillstein, whose firm of Brillstein/Grey Entertainment managed Farley, had repeatedly sent Farley to drug and alcohol rehabilitation.

In 1997, there was a visible decline in Farley's health. He made a guest appearance on Nickelodeon's children's sketch comedy show All That, alongside future Saturday Night Live alum Kenan Thompson. The appearance proceeded without incident, but the physical comedy for which Farley was famous was minimal, arguably because it was noticeable Farley was breathing heavily and struggling to perform. In the final years of his life, Farley sought treatment for his weight and drug abuse on 17 occasions.

On October 25, 1997, Farley made his final appearance on Saturday Night Live as a first-time host. The cold open featured Lorne Michaels doubting Farley's ability to host, with Tim Meadows advocating that "he will be calm, he will be focused and he will be good ... His party days are over." Chevy Chase was Farley's "sponsor" in the sketch. In fact there was genuine uncertainty over whether Farley would be able to perform; Chris Rock, who appeared in his opening monologue, was reportedly on standby to host himself if required. Farley's voice was noticeably hoarse following the dress rehearsal, and he appeared flushed and out of breath during the episode. Similar to Farley's appearance on All That, however, the episode of Saturday Night Live had ultimately concluded without any major incidents.

== Death ==
On December 18, 1997, at approximately 2:00 p.m. CST, Farley was found on the floor by his younger brother John in his apartment in the John Hancock Center in Chicago but pronounced dead at 3:45 pm. He was 33 years old. An autopsy revealed that Farley had died of an overdose of a combination of cocaine and morphine, commonly known as a "speedball". Advanced atherosclerosis was also cited as a "significant contributing factor".

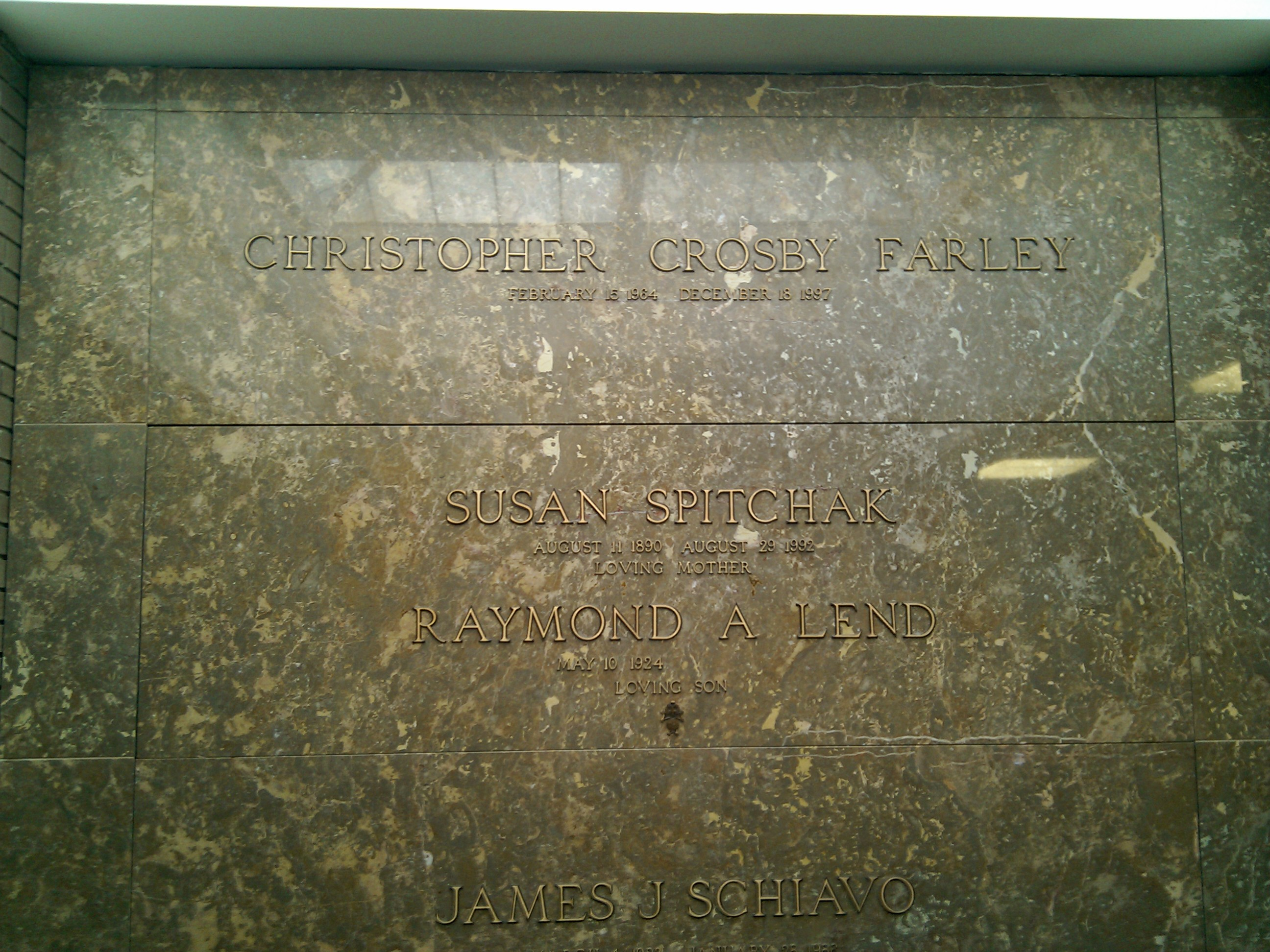
Farley's grave in 2010

A private funeral was held for Farley on December 23 at Our Lady Queen of Peace Catholic Church in his hometown of Madison, Wisconsin. Over 500 people attended his funeral, including many comedians who had worked with him on Saturday Night Live and on film, such as Dan Aykroyd, Adam Sandler, Chris Rock, Rob Schneider, Lorne Michaels, Al Franken, John Goodman, Bob Odenkirk, Tim Meadows, Norm Macdonald, Robert Smigel, George Wendt, and Phil Hartman. One of Farley's best friends and colleague, David Spade, was absent, fueling some speculation that there was some falling out with Farley prior to his death. Years later Spade denied this, saying that his absence from the funeral was because he would have found it too emotionally overwhelming. Another funeral was held on January 13, 1998, at St. Monica Catholic Church. Farley's remains were interred at Resurrection Cemetery in Madison.

== Legacy ==
Farley's career, private life, and early death have often been compared to that of his comedy idol John Belushi, who died at the same age and from a similar drug overdose.

On August 26, 2005, Farley was posthumously awarded the 2,289th star on the Hollywood Walk of Fame, located in front of IO West. An authorized biography of Farley, The Chris Farley Show, was written by his brother Tom Jr. and Tanner Colby. The song "Purple Stain" from the Red Hot Chili Peppers' 1999 album, Californication, contains the lyric "Farley is an angel and I can prove this" as a tribute to Farley.

A television documentary on his life I Am Chris Farley was shown on August 10, 2015. Farley was also the subject of the TV program, Autopsy: The Last Hours of Chris Farley, which premiered on November 19, 2016, on the Reelz channel.

In 2018, Adam Sandler wrote and performed an emotional tribute song dedicated to Farley in his Netflix stand-up special Adam Sandler: 100% Fresh. Netflix released the performance on YouTube later that year to commemorate the 21st anniversary of Farley's death. Sandler later played the song live on an episode of Saturday Night Live that he hosted on May 4, 2019.

On April 12, 2024, a Chris Farley biopic starring Paul Walter Hauser and directed by Josh Gad from a script by Scott Neustadter and Michael H. Weber was announced to be in the works, with SNL creator Lorne Michaels set to produce. Later that month, New Line Cinema and Warner Bros. Pictures acquired the rights to the project for $2.5 million.

== Filmography ==
=== Film ===
Year	Title	Role	Notes
1992	Wayne's World	Security Guard	Film debut
1993	Coneheads	Ronnie Bradford	
1993	Wayne's World 2	Milton	
1994	Airheads	Officer Wilson	
1995	Billy Madison	Bus Driver	Uncredited
1995	Tommy Boy	Thomas "Tommy" Callahan III	MTV Movie Awards Best On-Screen Duo (Shared with David Spade)
1995	Shrek - I Feel Good Animation Test	Shrek (voice)	Animated test short; released in 2023
1996	Black Sheep	Michael "Mike" Donnelly	
1997	Beverly Hills Ninja	Haru	Nominated: MTV Movie Awards Best Comedic Performance
1998	Almost Heroes	Bartholomew Hunt	Posthumous release
1998	Dirty Work	Jimmy No-Nose	Uncredited; posthumous release (final film role)

=== Television ===
Year	Title	Role	Notes
1990–1995	Saturday Night Live	Matt Foley / Various characters	Main cast (seasons 16–20)
1992	The Jackie Thomas Show	Chris Thomas	Episode: "Ottumwa 52501"
1993	Roseanne	Man in Clothing Store	Episode: "Glengarry, Glen Rosey"
1993	The Larry Sanders Show	Himself	Episode: "NY or LA?"
1994	Tom	Chris	Episode: "He's Heavy, He's My Brother"
1997	All That	The Chicago Ketchup Chef	Episode: "Mint Condition"
1997	Saturday Night Live	Himself (host)	Episode: "Chris Farley/The Mighty Mighty Bosstones"
