= Fading Out =

Fading Out EP

EP by Primitive Radio Gods
- Released: September 4, 2001
- Recorded: 2000 & 2001
- Genre: Alternative rock, indie rock
- Length: 19:02
- Label: What Are Records?

Primitive Radio Gods chronology
White Hot Peach (2000)	Fading Out EP (2001)	Still Electric (2003)

Fading Out is the Primitive Radio Gods' first and only officially released EP. It doubles as an extended single for the song of the same name from the White Hot Peach album. Aside from the title track, the EP contains two songs from Mellotron On! that did not make the cut for White Hot Peach, a remix of "Fading Out", and a new track called "Rope".

== Track listing ==
1. "Fading Out" (3:53)
2. "Stereo Winter" (4:04)
3. "Rope" (3:12)
4. "Future Followers of Erika" (3:40)
5. "Fading Out (Umpteen Spooks Mix)" (4:13)

=== Trivia ===
- The song "Rope" would later be re-recorded by former member Jeff Sparks' band Duplex on their 2003 album Hot Looks for Summer, which also included re-recorded versions of PRG songs "Agent of Deliverance" and "Becky Brown" from the eMusic-released Sing Monkey Sing demo tape.
