= Rocket (Primitive Radio Gods album) =

Studio album by Primitive Radio Gods
- Released: June 18, 1996
- Recorded: 1991
- Genre: Alternative rock
- Length: 46:18
- Language: English
- Label: Columbia
- Producer: Chris O'Connor

Primitive Radio Gods chronology
Rocket (1996)	White Hot Peach (2000)

Singles from Rocket
- 1. "Standing Outside a Broken Phone Booth with Money in My Hand" Released: June 1996; 2. "Motherfucker" Released: 1996

Rocket is the Primitive Radio Gods' debut album, released on June 18, 1996, by Columbia Records. "Standing Outside a Broken Phone Booth with Money in My Hand" was a hit single.

== Reception ==
Professional ratings
Review scores
Source	Rating
AllMusic	2.5/5 stars
Pitchfork	1.2/10

Despite the critical acclaim surrounding the lead single, the album as a whole received negative reviews from critics. AllMusic critic Stephen Thomas Erlewine wrote: "Most of Rocket sounds exactly like somebody messing around with a four-track, more intent on capturing sounds, not songs. Usually, this would at least result in some interesting sounds, but O'Connor hasn't even managed that. At its core, Rocket sounds like a demo tape with one promising song."

Pitchfork writer Ryan Schreiber said, "At any rate, you don't want Rocket in your record collection now or ever since the music sounds like a third-rate, decaffeinated version of Ned's Atomic Dustbin and because, by reading Pitchfork, you've already proven you have better taste than that (I hope)." Schreiber gave it an extremely negative rating of 1.2/10, falling under "Awful, not a single pleasant track". However, Schreiber wrote that "Phone Booth" "as a single, is going to sell like the Rubik's Cube.", but that "as an album? Let's face it: Three minutes is enough for even the most mind-numbed, tasteless societal outcast."

== Track listing ==
All songs written by Chris O'Connor, except where noted.

1. "Women" – 4:18
2. "Motherfucker" – 5:20
3. "Standing Outside a Broken Phone Booth with Money in My Hand" – 5:38
4. "Who Say" – 3:24
5. "The Rise and Fall of Ooo Mau" – 3:50
6. "Where the Monkey Meets the Man" (O'Connor, Jeff Sparks) – 4:17
7. "Are You Happy?" (O'Connor, Sparks)– 5:35
8. "Chain Reaction" – 4:47
9. "Skin Turns Blue" – 4:27
10. "Rocket" – 4:42

== Personnel ==
Primitive Radio Gods

- Chris O'Connor – performer, songwriter, producer

Additional

- Mary Kay Fishell – additional vocals (tracks 2 and 3)
- Jeff Sparks – additional guitar (tracks 6 and 7)
- Tim Lauterio – drums (tracks 6 and 7)
- David Vaught – engineer, bass (track 9)
- Ray Staff – mastering
- Valerie Phillips – photography
- Lisa Wright – CD photo

== Chart performance ==
Album

Year	Chart	Position
1996	Billboard 200	36

Singles

Year	Single	Chart	Position
1996	"Standing Outside a Broken Phone Booth with Money in My Hand"	Adult Top 40	19
1996	"Standing Outside a Broken Phone Booth with Money in My Hand"	Mainstream Rock Tracks	32
1996	"Standing Outside a Broken Phone Booth with Money in My Hand"	Modern Rock Tracks	1
1996	"Standing Outside a Broken Phone Booth with Money in My Hand"	Top 40 Mainstream	7
1996	"Standing Outside a Broken Phone Booth with Money in My Hand"	Hot 100 Airplay	10
