= Shrek =

2001 DreamWorks Animation film

- Theatrical release poster
- Directed by: Andrew Adamson; Vicky Jenson
- Written by: Ted Elliott; Terry Rossio; Joe Stillman; Roger S. H. Schulman
- Based on: Shrek! by William Steig
- Produced by: Aron Warner; John H. Williams; Jeffrey Katzenberg
- Starring: Mike Myers; Eddie Murphy; Cameron Diaz; John Lithgow
- Edited by: Sim Evan-Jones
- Music by: Harry Gregson-Williams; John Powell
- Production companies: DreamWorks Animation; PDI/DreamWorks
- Distributed by: DreamWorks Pictures (through DreamWorks Distribution) (Note: In July 2014, the film's distribution rights were purchased by DreamWorks Animation from Paramount Pictures (owners of the pre-2005 DreamWorks Pictures catalog) and transferred to 20th Century Fox before reverting to Universal Pictures in 2018 following NBCUniversal's acquisition of DreamWorks Animation in 2016.)
- Release dates: April 22, 2001 (Mann Village Theatre); May 18, 2001 (United States)
- Running time: 90 minutes
- Country: United States
- Language: English
- Budget: $60 million
- Box office: $494.3 million

Shrek is a 2001 American animated fantasy comedy film directed by Andrew Adamson and Vicky Jenson, and written by Ted Elliott, Terry Rossio, Joe Stillman, and Roger S. H. Schulman, loosely based on the 1990 children's picture book Shrek! by William Steig. It is the first installment in the Shrek film series, and stars Mike Myers, Eddie Murphy, Cameron Diaz and John Lithgow. In the film, an embittered ogre named Shrek (voiced by Myers) finds his home in the swamp overrun by fairy tale creatures banished by the obsessive ruler Lord Farquaad (Lithgow). With the help of Donkey (Murphy), Shrek makes a pact with Farquaad to rescue Princess Fiona (Diaz) in exchange for regaining control of his swamp.

After purchasing the rights to Steig's book in 1991, Steven Spielberg sought to produce a traditionally-animated film adaptation, but John H. Williams convinced him to bring the project to the newly-founded DreamWorks Pictures in 1994. Jeffrey Katzenberg, along with Williams and Aron Warner, began development on Shrek in 1995, immediately following the studio's purchase of the rights from Spielberg. Chris Farley was cast as the voice of the title character, recording most of the required dialogue, but died in 1997 before his work on the film was completed; Myers was hired to replace him, and gave Shrek his characteristic Scottish accent. The film was originally intended to be created using motion capture, but after poor test results, the studio hired Pacific Data Images to complete the final computer animation. Shrek parodies other fairy tale adaptations, primarily Disney animated films.

Shrek premiered at the Mann Village Theatre in Westwood on April 22, 2001, and was later shown at the 2001 Cannes Film Festival where it competed for the Palme d'Or, making it the first animated film since The Missing Link (1980) to be chosen as main competition at the festival. The film was theatrically released by DreamWorks Pictures in the United States on May 18, 2001, and grossed $494.3 million worldwide, becoming the fourth highest-grossing film of 2001. It received widespread acclaim from critics for its animation, voice performances, soundtrack, writing and humor, which they noted catered to both children and adults. Shrek was named one of the top ten films of 2001 by the American Film Institute, the first animated film to be listed, and won numerous accolades including the BAFTA Award for Best Adapted Screenplay and the inaugural Academy Award for Best Animated Feature.

The film's major success helped establish DreamWorks Animation as a competitor to Pixar in feature film computer animation. Three sequels have been released—Shrek 2 (2004), Shrek the Third (2007), and Shrek Forever After (2010)—along with other productions, notably a fourth sequel—Shrek 5 (2027)—in development. It is also regarded as one of the most influential animated films of the 2000s and one of the greatest animated films ever made. In 2020, the United States Library of Congress selected Shrek for preservation in the National Film Registry, becoming the first animated film of the 21st century to be preserved.

== Plot ==
Shrek is an asocial ogre who loves the solitude of his swamp and enjoys fending off mobs and intruders. One day, his life is interrupted after he inadvertently saves a talkative Donkey from some soldiers, prompting Donkey to forcibly stay with him. Donkey is one of many fairy tale creatures that are being exiled by the dwarfish Lord Farquaad of Duloc to beautify his land. However, the creatures inadvertently end up in the swamp. Angered by the intrusion, Shrek resolves to visit Farquaad and demand that he move the creatures elsewhere, reluctantly allowing Donkey to accompany him as he is the only one who knows where Duloc is.

Meanwhile, Farquaad asks a magic mirror if he has the most perfect kingdom; the mirror tells him he is not a king and would need to marry a princess in order to become one. Presented with three options, Farquaad chooses Princess Fiona, who is imprisoned in a castle guarded by a Dragon. Unwilling to rescue Fiona himself, he organizes a tournament, the winner receiving the "privilege" of rescuing her on his behalf. When Farquaad sees Shrek and Donkey in his castle, he announces that whoever kills Shrek will win the tournament; however, Shrek and Donkey defeat Farquaad's knights with relative ease. Amused, Farquaad proclaims Shrek his champion, and agrees to relocate the fairy tale creatures in exchange for Shrek rescuing Fiona.

Shrek and Donkey travel to the castle and Dragon attacks them. Shrek locates Fiona, who is bewildered by his lack of romanticism; they flee the castle after rescuing Donkey from Dragon, who is revealed to be female and has fallen in love with him. When Shrek removes his helmet and reveals he is an ogre, Fiona stubbornly refuses to go to Duloc, demanding Farquaad arrive in person to save her, but Shrek carries Fiona against her will. That night, after setting up camp, and with Fiona alone in a cave, Shrek admits to Donkey that he is asocial because he grew frustrated over being constantly judged for his appearance. Fiona overhears this and becomes kinder to Shrek. The next day, Robin Hood and his band of Merry Men harass the three, but Fiona easily defeats them in physical combat. Shrek becomes impressed with Fiona, and they begin to fall in love.

When the trio nears Duloc, Fiona takes shelter in a windmill for the evening. Donkey enters alone and discovers that Fiona has transformed into an ogress. She explains that during her childhood, she was cursed to transform into an ogress at night but retain her human form during the day. She tells Donkey that only "true love's first kiss" will break the spell and allow her to "take love's true form". Meanwhile, Shrek is about to confess his feelings to Fiona, when he overhears Fiona referring to herself as an "ugly beast". Thinking that she is talking about him, Shrek angrily leaves and returns the next morning with Farquaad. Confused and hurt by Shrek's abrupt hostility, Fiona reluctantly accepts Farquaad's marriage proposal and requests that they be married that day before sunset. Shrek dismisses Donkey and returns to his now vacated swamp, but quickly realizes that he feels miserable without Fiona. Donkey returns and lectures Shrek for jumping to conclusions and reveals that Fiona was not referring to him as an "ugly beast", although Donkey does not reveal Fiona's secret to Shrek. The two reconcile, and Donkey summons Dragon, whom he had reunited with earlier in the day. Shrek and Donkey ride Dragon to Duloc so they can stop the wedding.

Shrek interrupts the ceremony just before it ends and expresses his feelings for Fiona. The sun sets, and Fiona transforms into an ogress in front of everyone. Disgusted and enraged, Farquaad orders Shrek to be executed and Fiona re-imprisoned, while he declares himself king. The two are saved when Dragon, ridden by Donkey, breaks in and devours Farquaad. Shrek and Fiona kiss, and Fiona's curse is broken; though she remains an ogress, Shrek reassures her that he still finds her beautiful. They marry in the swamp with the fairy tale creatures in attendance, then leave for their honeymoon. (Note: As depicted in Shrek 2 (2004))

== Voice cast ==
- Mike Myers as:
  - Shrek
  - One of the Three Blind Mice
- Eddie Murphy as Donkey
- Cameron Diaz as Princess Fiona
- John Lithgow as Lord Farquaad
- Vincent Cassel as "Monsieur" Robin Hood
- Conrad Vernon as Gingerbread Man
- Chris Miller as:
  - Magic Mirror
  - Geppetto
- Cody Cameron as:
  - Pinocchio
  - The Three Little Pigs
- Simon J. Smith as Blind Mouse
- Christopher Knights as:
  - Thelonius
  - One of the Three Blind Mice
- Aron Warner as Big Bad Wolf
- Jim Cummings as Captain of the Guards
- Kathleen Freeman as Old Woman (Note: Donkey's ex-owner.) (Note: This was Freeman's last film role before her death.)
- Andrew Adamson as Duloc Mascot (Note: A man dressed in a suit that looks like Lord Farquaad.)
- Bobby Block as Baby Bear from the Three Bears
- Michael Galasso as Peter Pan

== Production ==
=== Development ===
At the time DreamWorks Pictures was founded, producer John H. Williams got hold of the book from his children and when he brought it to DreamWorks, it caught CEO Jeffrey Katzenberg's attention and the studio decided to make it into a film. Recounting the inspiration of making the film, Williams said:

Every development deal starts with a pitch and my pitch came from my then kindergartner, in collaboration with his pre-school brother. Upon our second reading of Shrek, the kindergartner started quoting large segments of the book pretending he could read them. Even as an adult, I thought Shrek was outrageous, irreverent, iconoclastic, gross, and just a lot of fun. He was a great movie character in search of a movie.

After buying the rights to the film, Katzenberg quickly put it in active development in November 1995. Steven Spielberg had thought about making a traditionally animated film adaptation of the book before, when he bought the rights to the book in 1991 before the founding of DreamWorks, where Bill Murray would play Shrek and Steve Martin would play Donkey. In the beginning of production, co-director Andrew Adamson refused to be intimidated by Katzenberg and had an argument with him about how much the film should appeal to adults. Katzenberg wanted both audiences, but he deemed some of Adamson's ideas, such as adding sexual jokes and Guns N' Roses music to the soundtrack, to be too outrageous. Adamson and Kelly Asbury joined in 1997 to co-direct the film. However, Asbury left a year later for work on the 2002 film Spirit: Stallion of the Cimarron, and was replaced with story artist Vicky Jenson, although Asbury would later co-direct the sequel. Both Adamson and Jenson decided to work on the film in half, so the crew could at least know whom to go to with specific detail questions about the film's sequences; "We both ended up doing a lot of everything," Adamson said. "We're both kinda control freaks, and we both wanted to do everything."

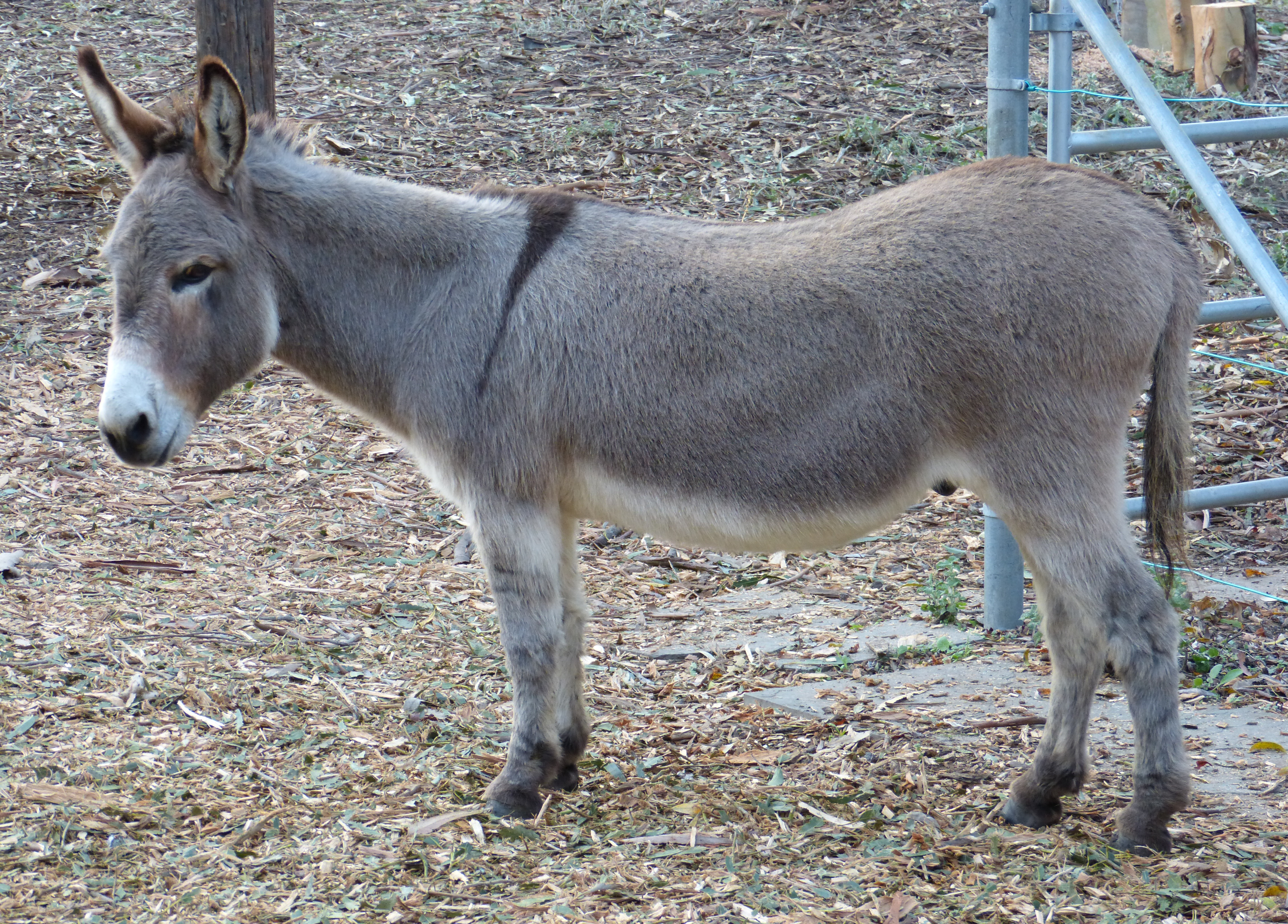
Perry in Palo Alto (2016)

Early development of the film from 1996–1997 involved concept art designed in Photoshop, which depicted a significantly different aesthetic and setting for the titular character. Initial iterations placed Shrek's home within a garbage dump near a human settlement, referenced as Wart Creek. Furthermore, early conceptual drafts explored a background where Shrek resided with his parents and featured habits such as storing decaying fish in his bedroom. Donkey was modeled after Pericles (born 1994; died 2025; also known as Perry), a real miniature donkey from Barron Park in Palo Alto, California. Raman Hui, supervising animator of Shrek, stated that Fiona "wasn't based on any real person" and he did many different sketches for her. He had done over 100 sculptures of Fiona before the directors chose the final design. In early development, the art directors visited Hearst Castle, Stratford upon Avon, and Dordogne for inspiration. Art Director Douglas Rogers visited a magnolia plantation in Charleston, South Carolina, as inspiration for Shrek's swamp. Planned characters not used in the film include Goldilocks and Sleeping Beauty.

=== Writing ===
The screenplay was written by Ted Elliott, Terry Rossio, Joe Stillman, and Roger S. H. Schulman, loosely based on the picture book by William Steig. The way Steig upended fairy tale conventions in the original book by making an ogre the protagonist formed the basis for the movie being a parody of fairy tales. Elliott and Rossio began writing for the film in 1997 and worked on the project for two years. Elliott and Rossio were also credited as co-producers for the film. They centered the four main characters' personalities on maladaptive responses to self-esteem issues; as the DreamWorks story crew developed the plot, their personalities remained the same, ensuring the "thematic unity" of the story was preserved. When the studio leaned towards Shrek being a kind person shunned for being an ogre, they pushed for Shrek to remain a "misanthropic anti-hero."

=== Casting ===
Nicolas Cage was initially offered the role of Shrek but turned it down because he did not want to look like an ogre. In 2013, Cage explained: "When you're drawn, in a way it says more about how children are going to see you than anything else, and I so care about that." Alternately, Ian Bagg auditioned for the role but was rejected.

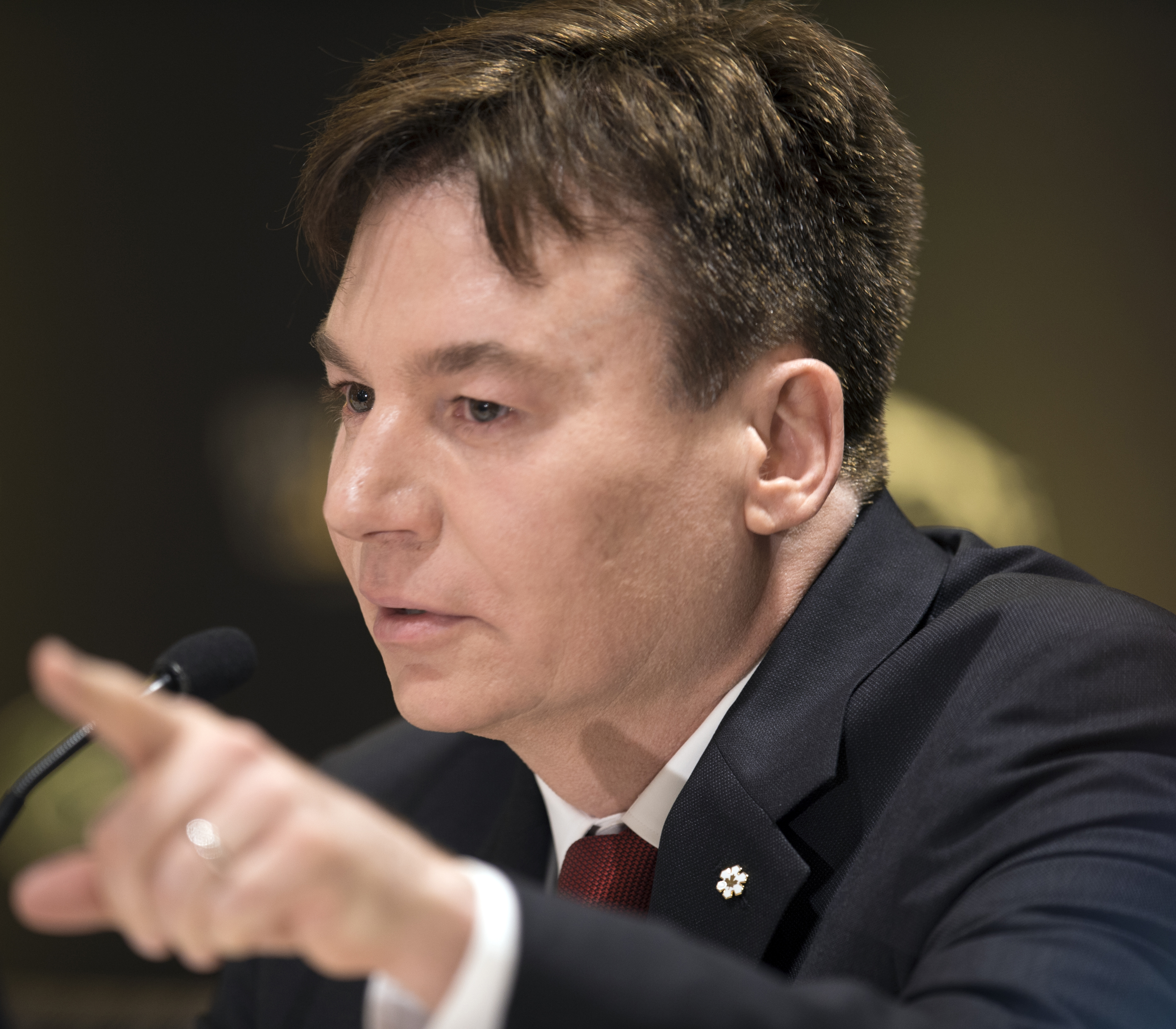
Following the death of Chris Farley in late 1997, Mike Myers was re-cast as the voice of Shrek for the film.

Chris Farley was initially hired to voice Shrek, and he had recorded nearly all of the dialogue for the character, but died before completing the project. According to David Spade, Farley only had 5 days of voice work left to perform; Farley's brother John was asked if he would come in and finish the remaining lines, but he refused. A story reel featuring a sample of Farley's recorded dialogue was leaked to the public in August 2015. Katzenberg pitched the film to Mike Myers at the premiere of Saving Private Ryan (1998), after hearing the pitch he thought that Shrek was the "worst fucking title" he ever heard. DreamWorks then re-cast the voice role to Myers, who insisted on a complete script rewrite, to leave no traces of Farley's version of Shrek. According to Myers, he wanted to voice the character "for two reasons: I wanted the opportunity to work with Jeffrey Katzenberg; and [the book is] a great story about accepting yourself for who you are."

After Myers had completed providing the voice for the character over the course of 1999 and the film was well into production, a rough cut of the movie was shown to him in February 2000. Myers asked to re-record all of his lines with a Scottish accent, similar to that his mother used when she told him bedtime stories and also used for his roles in other films, such as So I Married an Axe Murderer and Austin Powers: The Spy Who Shagged Me. According to the DVD commentary, he had also tried using a Lothar of the Hill People accent and a Canadian accent. After hearing the alternative, Katzenberg agreed to redo scenes in the film, saying, "It was so good we took $4M worth of animation out and did it again." Myers disputed the cost, saying "it didn't cost the studio 'millions of dollars'," as rumored. "What it meant is instead of me going in for ten sessions, I went in for twenty sessions. I got paid the same." Because of Myers voicing the character, more ideas began to come. There were clearer story points, fresher gags and comedy bits. "I got a letter from Spielberg thanking me so much for caring about the character," Myers said. "And he said the Scottish accent had improved the movie."

Another person planned to voice a character in the film was Janeane Garofalo, who was set to star alongside Farley as Princess Fiona. However, she was fired from the project for unexplained reasons. Years later, Garofalo stated "I was never told why [I was fired]. I assume because I sound like a man sometimes? I don't know why. Nobody told me ... But, you know, the movie didn't do anything, so who cares?"

According to a live episode of Dana Carvey and David Spade's podcast Fly on the Wall, Chris Rock was asked twice by DreamWorks to replace Murphy as the voice of Donkey. According to Rock, he was given the offer after Murphy would take a long time recording the lines in his home studio. He turned it down and has stated he regrets it.

=== Animation ===
Shrek was originally set up to be a live-action animation hybrid with background plate miniature sets and the main characters composited into the scene as motion-captured computer graphics, using an ExpertVision Hires Falcon 10 camera system to capture and apply realistic human movement to the characters. Softimage was used, as well as Mental Ray. A sizable crew was hired to run a test, and after a year and a half of R & D, the test was finally screened in May 1997. The results were not satisfactory, with Katzenberg stating "It looked terrible, it didn't work, it wasn't funny, and we didn't like it." The animation, known as Shrek – I Feel Good Animation Test, was not released publicly until 2023 when it was posted by production designer Barry E. Jackson on his YouTube channel. The studio then turned to its production partners at Pacific Data Images (PDI), who began production with the studio in 1998 and helped Shrek get to its final, computer-animated look. At this time, Antz was still in production at the studio and effects supervisor Ken Bielenberg was asked by Aron Warner "to start development for Shrek". Similar to previous PDI films, PDI used its own proprietary software (like the Fluid Animation System) for its animated movies. For some elements, however, it also took advantage of some of the powerhouse animation software on the market. This is particularly true with Maya, which PDI used for most of its dynamic cloth animation and for the hair of Fiona and Farquaad.

"We did a lot of work on character and set-up, and then kept changing the set up while we were doing the animation," Hui noted. "In Antz, we had a facial system that gave us all the facial muscles under the skin. In Shrek, we applied that to whole body. So, if you pay attention to Shrek when he talks, you see that when he opens his jaw, he forms a double chin, because we have the fat and the muscles underneath. That kind of detail took us a long time to get right." One of the most difficult parts of creating the film was making Donkey's fur flow smoothly so that it did not look like that of a Chia Pet. This fell into the hands of the surfacing animators, who used flow controls within a complex shader to provide the fur with many attributes (ability to change directions, lie flat, swirl, etc.). It was then the job of the visual effects group, led by Ken Bielenberg, to make the fur react to environment conditions. Once the technology was mastered, it could be applied to many aspects of the movie, including grass, moss, beards, eyebrows, and even threads on Shrek's tunic. Making human hair realistic was different from Donkey's fur, requiring a separate rendering system and much attention from the lighting and visual effects teams.

Shrek has 31 sequences, with 1,288 total shots. Aron Warner said that the creators "envisioned a magical environment that you could immerse yourself into". Shrek includes 36 separate in-film locations to make the world of the film, which DreamWorks claimed was more than any previous computer-animated feature. In-film locations were finalized and, as demonstrated by past DreamWorks animated movies, color and mood was of the utmost importance. The animation was completed in 2000.

=== Music ===
Shrek is the third DreamWorks animated film (and the only film in the Shrek series) to have Harry Gregson-Williams team up with John Powell to compose the score following Antz (1998) and Chicken Run (2000). Powell was left out to compose scores for later Shrek films with Gregson-Williams due to a conflict. The score was recorded at Abbey Road Studios by Nick Wollage and Slamm Andrews, with the latter mixing it at Media Ventures and Patricia Sullivan-Fourstar handling mastering.

Shrek introduced a new element to give the film a unique feel. The film used pop music and other oldies to make the story more forward. Covers of songs like "On the Road Again" and "Try a Little Tenderness" were integrated in the film's score. The band Smash Mouth's song "All Star" gained massive popularity after its original release two years earlier, due to its usage in the film's opening credits. The filmmakers for Shrek had originally used the song as a placeholder for the opening credits and intended to replace it with an original composition by Matt Mahaffey's band Self that would mimic the feel of "All Star", named "Stay Home". However, DreamWorks executive Jeffrey Katzenberg suggested for them to use "All Star" over the sequence instead, with Stay Home ultimately playing over the credits sequence instead. As the film was about to be completed, Katzenberg suggested to the filmmakers to redo the film's ending to "go out with a big laugh"; instead of ending the film with just a storybook closing over Shrek and Fiona as they ride off into the sunset, they decided to add a cover of The Monkees' "I'm a Believer" by Smash Mouth and show all the fairytale creatures in the film.

Although Rufus Wainwright's version of the song "Hallelujah" appeared in the soundtrack album, it was John Cale's version that appeared in the film; in a radio interview, Rufus Wainwright suggested that his version of "Hallelujah" did not appear in the film due to the "glass ceiling" he was hitting because of his sexuality. An alternative explanation is that, although the filmmakers wanted Cale's version for the film, licensing issues prevented its use in the soundtrack album, because Wainwright was an artist for DreamWorks but Cale was not.

The film's 1996 animation test, made public in 2023, used the song "I Got You (I Feel Good)".

== Release ==
In celebration of its 25th anniversary, Shrek was theatrically re-released in the United States on May 15, 2026.

=== Marketing ===
In 2000, IMAX released CyberWorld onto its branded large-screen theaters. It was a compilation film that featured stereoscopic conversions of various animated shorts and sequences, including the bar sequence in Antz. DreamWorks was so impressed by the technology used for the sequence's "stereoscopic translation", that the studio and IMAX decided to plan a big-screen 3D version of Shrek. The film would have been re-released during the Christmas season of 2001, or the following summer, after its conventional 2D release. The re-release would have also included new sequences and an alternate ending. Plans for this was dropped due to "creative changes" instituted by DreamWorks and resulted in a loss of $1.18 million, down from IMAX's profit of $3.24 million. There was also a THX trailer that featured Shrek and Donkey playing instruments, which was supposed to be released theatrically in November 2001, but this was cut due to copyright issues and Disney's ongoing rivality with DreamWorks.

Radio Disney was told not to allow any ads for the film to air on the station, stating, "Due to recent initiatives with The Walt Disney Company, we are being asked not to align ourselves promotionally with this new release Shrek. Stations may accept spot dollars only in individual markets." The restriction was later relaxed to allow ads for the film's soundtrack album onto the network.

On May 7, 2001, Burger King began promotions for the film, giving out a selection of nine exclusive Candy Caddies based on the Shrek characters, in Big Kids Meal and Kids Meal orders. Ice cream chain Baskin-Robbins also ran an 8-week promotion of the film, selling products such as Shrek's Hot Sludge Sundae, a combination of Oreo Cookies 'n Cream ice cream, hot fudge, crushed chocolate cookies, whipped cream and squiggly gummy worms, and Shrek Freeze Frame Cake, featuring an image of Shrek and Donkey framed by sunflowers. This was to support the film's DVD/VHS release.

=== Home media ===
Shrek was released by DreamWorks Home Entertainment on VHS and DVD on November 2, 2001. It surpassed Star Wars: Episode I – The Phantom Menace's short-lived record for being the fastest-selling DVD title of all time, selling 2.5 million copies within the first three days of release. Another 4.5 million copies were sold on VHS in the same timespan, making it the biggest opening weekend in retail video since The Lion King in 1995. Both releases included Shrek in the Swamp Karaoke Dance Party, a 3-minute musical short film, that takes up right after Shrek's ending, with film's characters performing a medley of modern pop songs. As for the DVD release, this two-disc set features a fullscreen format on the first disc and a widescreen format on the second disc, with the latter featuring a DTS audio track.

Coincidentally, the film was released on video the same day that Pixar's Monsters, Inc. hit theaters. Since videos were traditionally released on Tuesdays, Disney's executives did not receive this well, saying that the move "seemed like an underhanded attempt to siphon off some of their film's steam". DreamWorks responded that it "simply shifted the release to a Friday to make it more of an event and predicted that it and other studios would do so more frequently with important films." Monsters, Inc. earned that weekend more than $62 million, breaking the record for an animated film, while Shrek's video release made more than $100 million, and eventually became the biggest selling DVD at the time with over 5.5 million sales. This broke the record previously held by Gladiator, another DreamWorks film. Shrek generated more than $420 million in revenue for DreamWorks on DVD and VHS, and has sold more than 21 million copies of the 23 million shipped by January 2002. Worldwide, more than 10 million Shrek DVDs have been sold by that point.

In February 2006, Paramount Pictures acquired the rights to all live-action films DreamWorks had released between 1997 and 2005, following Viacom's $1.6 billion acquisition of the company's live-action film assets and television assets. Additionally, Paramount signed a six-year distribution agreement for past and future DreamWorks Animation films, with DreamWorks Animation having spun off into a separate company from the live-action division in 2004. On August 16, 2010, Paramount Home Entertainment released a 10 film box set titled the "DreamWorks Animation Ultimate Box Set", which included Shrek, Shrek 2, Shrek the Third and 7 other DreamWorks Animation films. A 3D version of the film was released on Blu-ray 3D by Paramount Home Entertainment on December 1, 2010, along with its sequels, and a regular 2D Blu-ray boxset of the series was released six days later.

On December 31, 2012, DreamWorks Animation's distribution agreement with Paramount officially ended, and in July 2014, DreamWorks Animation announced they had reacquired the distribution rights to all of their films from Paramount, transferring these rights to their new distribution partner 20th Century Fox. On April 28, 2016, DreamWorks Animation was purchased by NBCUniversal for $3.8 billion. In commemoration of the film's 20th anniversary, an Ultra HD Blu-ray edition was released on May 11, 2021, by Universal Pictures Home Entertainment.

== Reception ==
=== Box office ===
Shrek opened on around 6,000 screens across 3,587 theaters, at that point the second highest number of locations in history behind only Mission: Impossible 2. Eleven locations screened the film digitally, the first time that DreamWorks had shown one of its films in this format. The film earned $11.6 million on its first day and $42.3 million on its opening weekend, topping the box office for the weekend and averaging $11,805 from 3,587 theaters. In its second weekend, due to the Memorial Day Weekend holiday, the film gained 0.3 percent to $42.5 million and $55.2 million over the four-day weekend, resulting in an overall 30 percent gain. Despite this, the film finished in second place behind Pearl Harbor and had an average of $15,240 from expanding to 3,623 sites. In its third weekend, the film retreated 34 percent to $28.2 million for a $7,695 average from expanding to 3,661 theaters. By mid-June 2001, Shrek became the top-grossing movie of the year domestically, defeating The Mummy Returns. This achievement would last until that December when it was beaten by Harry Potter and the Sorcerer's Stone. The film closed on December 6, 2001, after grossing $267.7 million domestically, along with $216.7 million overseas, for a worldwide total of $484.4 million. Produced on a $60 million budget, the film was a huge box office smash and is the fourth highest-grossing film of 2001.

Shrek became the highest-grossing animated film ever to be released in Australia, passing the mark set by The Lion King in 1994. In the United Kingdom, Shrek regained the top spot at the British box office after being beaten out the previous week by Lara Croft: Tomb Raider, earning a $20.3 million since its opening in the UK.

=== Critical response ===
In addition to being an instant box office success, Shrek received wide critical acclaim. 89% of 214 professional reviews of the film on the review aggregator website Rotten Tomatoes are positive, with an average rating of 8.3/10. The website's critical consensus reads, "While simultaneously embracing and subverting fairy tales, the irreverent Shrek also manages to tweak Disney's nose, provide a moral message to children, and offer viewers a funny, fast-paced ride." Metacritic assigned Shrek a weighted average score of 84 out of 100 based on 34 critics, indicating "universal acclaim". Audiences polled by CinemaScore gave the film an average grade of "A" on an A+ to F scale.

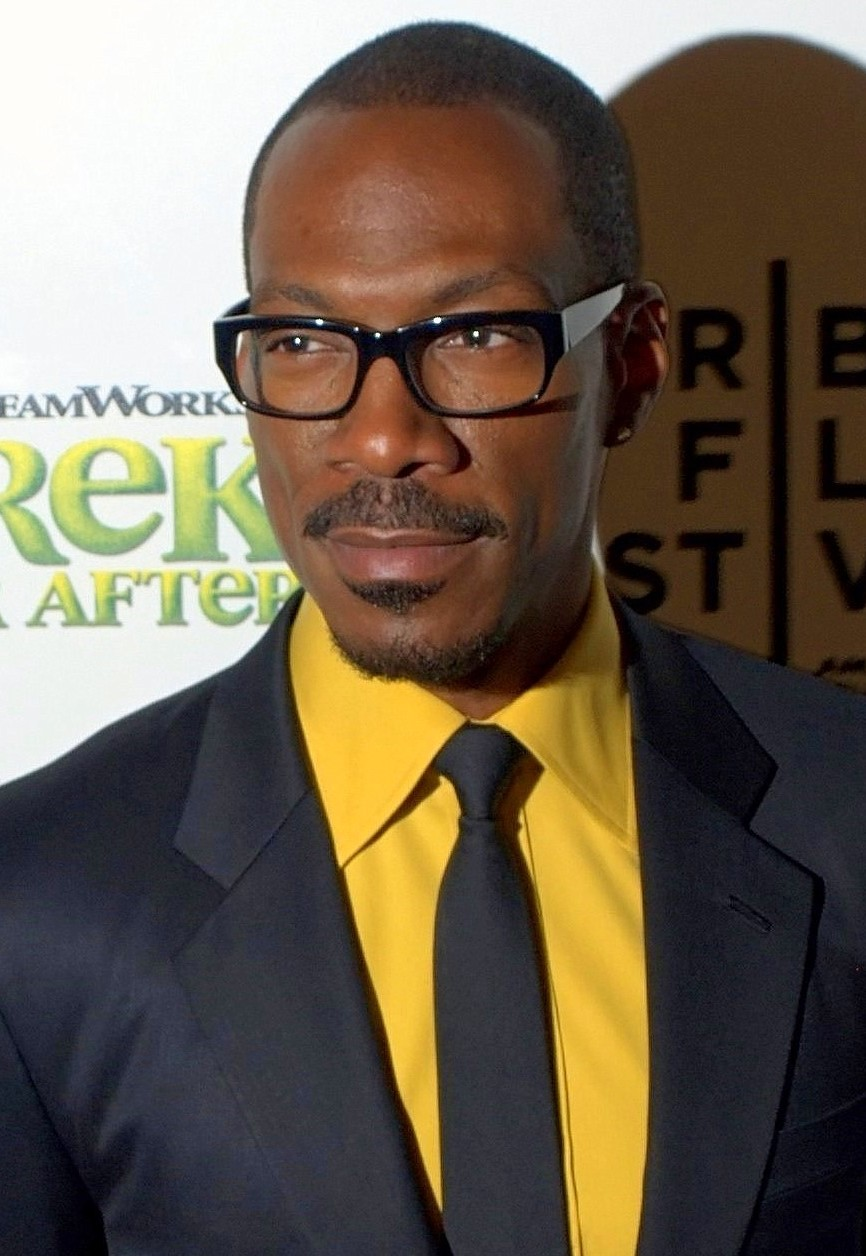
Murphy was particularly praised by reviewers for his performance as Donkey.

Roger Ebert praised the film, giving it four stars out of a possible four and describing it as "jolly and wicked, filled with sly in-jokes and yet somehow possessing a heart". USA Today's Susan Wloszczyna praised Eddie Murphy's performance, stating it "gives the comic performance of his career, aided by sensational digital artistry, as he brays for the slightly neurotic motormouth". Richard Schickel of Time also enjoyed Murphy's role, stating "No one has ever made a funnier jackass of himself than Murphy." Peter Rainer of New York magazine liked the script, also stating "The animation, directed by Andrew Adamson and Vicky Jenson, is often on the same wriggly, giggly level as the script, although the more "human" characters, such as Princess Fiona and Lord Farquaad, are less interesting than the animals and creatures—a common pitfall in animated films of all types." Peter Travers of Rolling Stone wrote "Shrek is a world-class charmer that could even seduce the academy when it hands out the first official animation Oscar next year." James Berardinelli of ReelViews gave the film three and a half stars out of four, saying "Shrek is not a guilty pleasure for sophisticated movie-goers; it is, purely and simply, a pleasure." Kenneth Turan of the Los Angeles Times wrote "The witty, fractured fairy tale Shrek has a solid base of clever writing." Lisa Schwarzbaum of Entertainment Weekly gave the film an A−, saying "A kind of palace coup, a shout of defiance, and a coming of age for DreamWorks." Jay Boyar of the Orlando Sentinel wrote "It's a pleasure to be able to report that the movie both captures and expands upon the book's playful spirit of deconstruction."

Steven Rosen of The Denver Post wrote "DreamWorks Pictures again proves a name to trust for imaginative, funny animated movies that delight kids and adults equally." Susan Stark of The Detroit News gave the film four out of four stars, saying "Swift, sweet, irreverent, rangy and as spirited in the writing and voice work as it is splendid in design." Jami Bernard of the New York Daily News gave the film four out of four stars, saying "The brilliance of the voice work, script, direction and animation all serve to make Shrek an adorable, infectious work of true sophistication." Rene Rodriguez gave the film three out of four stars, calling it "a gleefully fractured fairy tale that never becomes cynical or crass". Elvis Mitchell of The New York Times gave the film four out of five stars, saying "Beating up on the irritatingly dainty Disney trademarks is nothing new; it's just that it has rarely been done with the demolition-derby zest of Shrek." William Steig, the author of the original book, and his wife Jeanne Steig also enjoyed the film, stating "We all went sort of expecting to hate it, thinking, 'What has Hollywood done to it?' But we loved it. We were afraid it would be too sickeningly cute and, instead, Bill just thought they did a wonderful, witty job of it."

John Anderson of Newsday wrote "The kind of movie that will entertain everyone of every age and probably for ages to come." Jay Carr of The Boston Globe wrote "In an era when much on film seems old, Shrek seems new and fresh and clever." Stephen Hunter of The Washington Post gave the film five out of five stars, saying "Despite all its high-tech weirdness, it is really that most perdurable of human constructions, a tale told well and true." Joe Baltake of The Sacramento Bee wrote that it "isn't so much a fractured spoof of everything Disney, but actually a Monty Python flick for kids – kids of all ages". Andrew Sarris of The New York Observer wrote "What gives Shrek its special artistic distinction is its witty and knowingly sassy dialogue, delivered by vocally charismatic performers whose voices remind us of their stellar screen personae in live-action movies." Lisa Alspector of the Chicago Reader wrote "This romantic fantasy complicates the roles of beauty and beast, making it hard to guess what form a sensitive resolution will take." Joe Morgenstern of The Wall Street Journal wrote "The charms of Shrek, which is based on the children's book by William Steig, go far beyond in-jokes for adults." John Zebrowski of The Seattle Times gave the film three out of four stars, saying "The movie is helped immensely by its cast, who carry it through some of the early, sluggish scenes. But this is Murphy's movie. Donkey gets most of the good lines, and Murphy hits every one."

A mixed review came from Mark Caro of the Chicago Tribune, who gave the film two and a half stars out of four and compared it to Toy Story 2, which he said "had a higher in-jokes/laughs ratio without straining to demonstrate its hipness or to evoke heartfelt emotions". On the more negative side, Michael Atkinson of The Village Voice said he was "desperately avoiding the risk of even a half-second of boredom", and said "the movie is wall-to-window-to-door noise, babbling, and jokes (the first minute sees the first fart gag), and demographically it's a hard-sell shotgun spray." Christy Lemire of the Associated Press described Shrek as a "90-minute onslaught of in-jokes", and said while it "strives to have a heart" with "a message about beauty coming from within", "somehow [the message] rings hollow". Anthony Lane of The New Yorker said, despite the film "cunning the rendering of surfaces, there's still something flat and charmless in the digital look, and most of the pleasure rises not from the main romance but from the quick, incidental gags."

=== Accolades ===
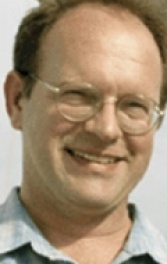
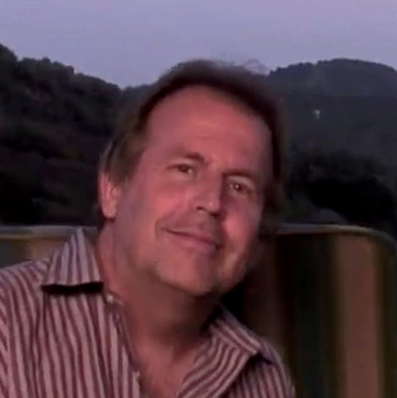
Ted Elliott (top) and Terry Rossio (bottom), alongside other writers Joe Stillman and Roger S. H. Schulman (both off-pictured), received critical acclaim and earned numerous accolades including the BAFTA and a nomination of Academy Award for Best Adapted Screenplay.

List of awards and nominations
Ceremony	Category	Recipient(s)	Result	Ref.
American Film Institute Awards	AFI Movie of the Year		Won	
74th Academy Awards (Note: At the 74th Academy Awards, Shrek was one of the first animated films to be nominated for and won the first-ever Academy Award for Best Animated Feature, beating Monsters, Inc. and Jimmy Neutron: Boy Genius. It was also the first animated film to be nominated for Best Adapted Screenplay.)	Best Animated Feature	Aron Warner	Won	
74th Academy Awards	Best Adapted Screenplay	Ted Elliott, Roger S. H. Schulman, Joe Stillman and Terry Rossio	Nominated	
American Cinema Editors Awards 2001	Best Edited Feature Film – Comedy or Musical	Sim Evan-Jones	Nominated	
29th Annie Awards	Animated Theatrical Feature	Jeffrey Katzenberg, Aron Warner, John H. Williams	Won	
29th Annie Awards	Character Animation	Paul Chung	Nominated	
29th Annie Awards	Character Animation	Raman Hui	Nominated	
29th Annie Awards	Character Animation	Jason Reisig	Nominated	
29th Annie Awards	Effects - Animation	Arnauld Lamorlette	Won	
29th Annie Awards	Directing in an Animated Feature Production	Andrew Adamson and Vicky Jenson	Won	
29th Annie Awards	Music Score an Animated Feature Production	Harry Gregson-Williams and John Powell	Won	
29th Annie Awards	Production Design in an Animated Feature Production	Guillaume Aretos	Won	
29th Annie Awards	Production Design in an Animated Feature Production	Douglas Rogers	Nominated	
29th Annie Awards	Storyboarding in an Animated Feature Production	Robert Koo	Won	
29th Annie Awards	Writing in an Animated Feature Production	Ted Elliott, Roger S. H. Schulman, Joe Stillman and Terry Rossio	Won	
29th Annie Awards	Voice Acting by a Male Performer in an Animated Feature Production	Eddie Murphy	Won	
55th BAFTA Awards (Note: Shrek was nominated six BAFTA Awards, including the BAFTA Award for Best Film; Eddie Murphy became the first, and so far, only actor to ever receive a BAFTA nomination for a voice-over performance, receiving a Best Actor in a Supporting Role nomination.)	Best Film	Jeffrey Katzenberg, Aron Warner, John H. Williams	Nominated	
55th BAFTA Awards	Best Actor in a Supporting Role	Eddie Murphy	Nominated	
55th BAFTA Awards	Best Adapted Screenplay	Ted Elliott, Roger S. H. Schulman, Joe Stillman and Terry Rossio	Won	
55th BAFTA Awards	Best Film Music	Harry Gregson-Williams and John Powell	Nominated	
55th BAFTA Awards	Best Sound	Andy Nelson, Anna Behlmer, Wylie Stateman and Lon Bender	Nominated	
55th BAFTA Awards	Best Visual Effects	Ken Bielenberg	Nominated	
2001 Cannes Film Festival (Note: Shrek is the first animated film to have entered in competition from the festival for five decades, since Disney's Peter Pan (1953) to be chosen to compete for the Palme d'Or.)	Palme d'Or	Shrek	Nominated	
BET Awards 2002	Best Actor	Eddie Murphy	Nominated	
Black Reel Awards of 2002	Best Supporting Actor	Eddie Murphy	Nominated	
7th Critics' Choice Awards	Best Picture	Jeffrey Katzenberg, Aron Warner, John H. Williams	Nominated	
7th Critics' Choice Awards	Best Animated Feature	Andrew Adamson and Vicky Jenson	Won	
59th Golden Globe Awards	Best Motion Picture – Musical or Comedy	Jeffrey Katzenberg, Aron Warner, John H. Williams	Nominated	
Golden Schmoes Award	Coolest Character of the Year	Shrek	Nominated	
44th Annual Grammy Awards	Best Compilation Soundtrack Album for a Motion Picture, Television or Other Visual Media	Shrek: Music from the Original Motion Picture	Nominated	
2002 Kids' Choice Awards	Favorite Voice from an Animated Movie	Eddie Murphy	Won	
2002 Kids' Choice Awards	Favorite Voice from an Animated Movie	Cameron Diaz	Nominated	
2002 Kids' Choice Awards	Favorite Movie	Shrek	Nominated	
2002 MTV Movie Awards	Best Movie	Shrek	Nominated	
2002 MTV Movie Awards	Best On-Screen Team	Cameron Diaz, Eddie Murphy and Mike Myers	Nominated	
2002 MTV Movie Awards	Best Comedic Performance	Eddie Murphy	Nominated	
2002 MTV Movie Awards	Best Comedic Performance	Mike Myers	Nominated	
28th People's Choice Awards	Favorite Motion Picture	Shrek	Won	
28th People's Choice Awards	Favorite Actor In A Comedy Motion Picture	Eddie Murphy	Won	
13th Producers Guild of America Awards (Note: Shrek was the first animated film to earn a PGA nomination.)	Best Theatrical Motion Picture	Shrek	Nominated	
28th Saturn Awards	Best Supporting Actor	Eddie Murphy	Nominated	
28th Saturn Awards	Best Writing	Ted Elliott, Terry Rossio, Joe Stillman and Roger S. H. Schulman	Nominated	
28th Saturn Awards	Best Music	Harry Gregson-Williams and John Powell	Nominated	
28th Saturn Awards	Best Fantasy Film	Shrek	Nominated	

== Legacy ==
=== Rank ===
Entertainment Weekly put Shrek on its end-of-the-decade "best-of" list for the 2000s, saying, "Prince Charming? So last millennium. This decade, fairy-tale fans – and Princess Fiona – fell for a fat and flatulent Ogre. Now, that's progress." In June 2008, the American Film Institute revealed its "Ten top Ten"; the best ten films in ten "classic" American film genres—after polling over 1,500 people from the creative community Shrek was acknowledged as the eighth best film in the animated genre, and the only non-Disney·Pixar film in the Top 10. Shrek was also ranked second in a Channel 4 poll of the "100 Greatest Family Films", losing out on the top spot to E.T. the Extra-Terrestrial. In 2005, Shrek came sixth in Channel 4's 100 Greatest Cartoons poll behind The Simpsons, Tom and Jerry, South Park, Toy Story and Family Guy. In November 2009, the character, Lord Farquaad, was listed No. 14 in IGN UK's "Top 15 Fantasy Villains". In 2006, it was ranked third on Bravo's 100 funniest films list. The film's title character was awarded his own star on the Hollywood Walk of Fame in May 2010.

American Film Institute recognition:

- AFI's 100 Years...100 Heroes & Villains:
  - Shrek – Nominated Hero
- AFI's 100 Years...100 Songs:
  - "I'm a Believer" – Nominated
- AFI's 100 Years...100 Movies (10th Anniversary Edition) – Nominated
- AFI's 10 Top 10 – No. 8 Animated film

=== Cultural impact ===
The New York Times retrospectively described the film as "a beloved, offbeat fairy tale whose characters and jokes continue to permeate pop culture, reaching another generation of fans." Previous films and television shows, such as Fractured Fairy Tales and The Princess Bride, had parodied the traditional fairy tale. Shrek had a significant impact that influenced a later generation of mainstream animated films, receiving recognition for being one of the most influential from the 2000s. Animated films such as Ice Age and Despicable Me began to incorporate more pop culture references. It also inspired a number of computer animated films which also spoofed fairy tales, or other related story genres, often including adult-oriented humor, such as Happily N'Ever After, Hoodwinked!, and Enchanted. In 2020, the United States Library of Congress selected Shrek to be preserved in the National Film Registry for being "culturally, historically, or aesthetically significant".

== Other media ==
Several video game adaptations of the film have been published on various game console platforms, including Shrek (2001), Shrek: Hassle at the Castle (2002), Shrek: Extra Large (2002), Shrek: Super Party (2002) and Shrek SuperSlam (2005). Shrek was also included as a bonus unlockable character in the video game Tony Hawk's Underground 2 (2004), and the 2026 mobile game FIFA Heroes.

In 2003, Dark Horse Comics released a three-issue mini-series comic book adaptation of Shrek which was written by Mark Evanier, and the issues were later compiled into a trade paperback.

A musical version, based on the film, with music by Jeanine Tesori and a book and lyrics by David Lindsay-Abaire, opened on Broadway on December 14, 2008, and closed January 3, 2010, running for a total of 441 performances. It starred Brian d'Arcy James in the title role, Sutton Foster as Princess Fiona, Christopher Sieber as Lord Farquaad, Daniel Breaker as Donkey, and John Tartaglia as Pinocchio. The Broadway production was recorded and released on DVD, Blu-ray and digital media. A North American Tour opened July 25, 2010, in Chicago. A London production opened in the West End on June 7, 2011. The musical received many Tony Award nominations and won the 2009 Tony Award for Best Costume Design. It received five Laurence Olivier Award nominations including Best New Musical.

A shot-for-shot fan remake titled Shrek Retold was released through 3GI Industries on November 29, 2018. The project was a collaboration of 200 filmmakers and mixes live action, hand drawn animation, Flash animation, CGI and various other art forms to recreate the film. The film is available on YouTube for free.

== Future ==
Three sequels were released over the years – the Oscar-nominated Shrek 2 in 2004, Shrek the Third in 2007, and Shrek Forever After in 2010. Shrek 2 was the only one to receive similar acclaim from critics, though all three sequels were commercially successful. Shrek the Halls (2007) and Scared Shrekless (2010) were released as holiday-themed short films. A spin-off prequel film entitled Puss in Boots, centered on the titular character's life before his debut in Shrek 2, was released in 2011, while a sequel, titled Puss in Boots: The Last Wish and set after the events of Shrek Forever After, was released in 2022. A fifth feature film was originally planned during the development of Shrek Forever After, but the idea was later abandoned by DreamWorks Animation CEO Jeffrey Katzenberg. Leading up to NBCUniversal's planned acquisition of DreamWorks Animation in 2016, it was announced that a fifth Shrek film would be released in 2019. On November 6, 2018, Variety reported that Chris Meledandri had been tasked to reboot both Shrek and Puss in Boots, with the original cast potentially returning to reprise their roles. While cast members reported that a script was completed for a fifth Shrek film, development stalled and future plans have yet to be officially announced. After it was reported in April 2023 that a fifth Shrek film with the original cast and a spinoff featuring Donkey was planned, Murphy said in June 2024 that he had begun voice recording sessions for Shrek 5 months ago and would begin working for the Donkey spinoff once it was finished. Shrek 5 is scheduled to be released in 2027. A spin-off film, Donkey, is in development, set for June 30, 2028.

== See also ==
- Shrek!
- Shrek – I Feel Good Animation Test
- Shrek fandom
- Fairy tale parody

== Bibliography ==
- Blair, Iain (May 5, 2001). "The Making of Shrek". digitalanimators.com. Archived from the original on January 2, 2006.
- Neuwirth, Allan (2003). Makin' Toons: Inside the Most Popular Animated TV Shows and Movies. Skyhorse Publishing Inc.
