= Boggy Depot =

Studio album by Jerry Cantrell
- Released: March 31, 1998 (vinyl); April 7, 1998 (CD)
- Recorded: April–November 1997
- Studios: Studio D, Sausalito, California; Record Plant, Sausalito, California; Paradise Sound, Index, Washington; Studio X, Seattle, Washington
- Genres: Alternative metal; grunge; alternative rock
- Length: 62:34
- Label: Columbia
- Producers: Jerry Cantrell, Toby Wright

Jerry Cantrell chronology
| Boggy Depot (1998) | Degradation Trip (2002) |

Singles from Boggy Depot
- 1. "Cut You In" Released: January 1998; 2. "My Song" Released: May 1998; 3. "Dickeye" Released: December 1998

Boggy Depot is the debut solo album by Alice in Chains guitarist and vocalist Jerry Cantrell. The vinyl edition was released on March 31, 1998, and the CD was released on April 7, 1998, through Columbia Records. The album was named after the ghost town of the same name in Oklahoma, where Cantrell's father grew up. In addition to singing, Cantrell also played guitar, piano, clavinet, organ, and steel drums on Boggy Depot. Cantrell produced the album along with Toby Wright. Cantrell's Alice in Chains bandmates, Sean Kinney and Mike Inez are featured on the album, as well as Les Claypool, Pantera's Rex Brown, and Fishbone's Angelo Moore and John Norwood Fisher. Boggy Depot debuted at No. 28 on the Billboard 200 and spent 14 weeks on the chart. The tracks "Cut You In", "My Song" and "Dickeye" were released as singles to promote the album. "Cut You In" peaked at No. 5. on Billboard's Mainstream Rock Tracks, "My Song" reached No. 6 and "Dickeye" peaked at No. 36. "Cut You In" was nominated for two Billboard Music Video Awards: Best Hard Rock/Metal Clip and Best New Hard Rock/Metal Artist Clip. Boggy Depot was reissued on colored vinyl on December 13, 2019.

== Background ==
In 1996, after Alice in Chains opened for the first Kiss reunion show in Detroit, Jerry Cantrell began work on his first solo album. With the help of producer Toby Wright, whom he had previously worked with in Alice in Chains, Cantrell worked on the album through 1997. Columbia originally gave a projected October 1997 release date which had to be postponed greatly. Early internet sources gave the incorrect album title as "Bogey Depot."

In February 1998, Cantrell spoke about the status of Alice in Chains and his new solo project to MTV News:

"Well, there's really nothing's up with Alice in Chains. We've been together for 11 years now, and we've done a lot of great music together and accomplished a lot of things and that's very special to me. We're a part of a group of fans that really put their stamp on the map, actually, on the world for that matter, and far surpassed where we probably initially thought we'd get to. So that's cool. That's in the books, and that's something we did and something to be proud of. But there also comes a point in the life of any band, I think, that it's time to change, and time to try new things."

Cantrell and Columbia launched his official website, JerryCantrell.com, in March 1998 to promote Boggy Depot. This would feature song clips and the "Cut You In" music video. It also included QuickTime video interview footage where Cantrell explained that he had been wanting to venture into solo territory for a while and, with Alice in Chains at a standstill, finally had the chance. However, in the June 1998 issue of Guitar World, Cantrell made it clear that his solo venture was actually a reluctant response to Alice in Chains' diffusing:

"It's something I never really wanted to do, but the way things have played out, it's like, why not? To be honest, I'd just be happy being the lead guitarist and singer for Alice in Chains. It's always been my first love, and always will be, but the situation being what it is... we've been together for a long time, and right now it's kinda played out. . . Now I've got to step up to the plate and take a few swings."

Boggy Depot incorporates piano, organ, and country elements, namely in the tracks "Hurt a Long Time" and "Between". Cantrell confirmed that as a child he was "raised on country music" and that he admires the strong emotion conveyed through the genre. However, the ominous guitar styles previously heard in Alice in Chains are undeniable in tracks like "Jesus Hands" and "Keep the Light On". The tracks "Settling Down" and "Hurt a Long Time" were originally introduced during the recording sessions for Alice in Chains' self-titled album in 1995, but the group chose not to record them. As such, they were the oldest and longest-awaited songs to be introduced on Boggy Depot. Although often mistaken as a song about Kurt Cobain's suicide, Cantrell stated that "Hurt a Long Time" is actually about the suicide of his cousin Kevin.

Boggy Depot features both bassist Mike Inez and drummer Sean Kinney of Alice in Chains. This further incited fans to regard it as a "lost" Alice in Chains record or as a follow-up to their 1995 self-titled release. Three other well-known bassists also contributed to the album: Rex Brown of Pantera, John Norwood Fisher of Fishbone, and Les Claypool of Primus. Cantrell credited his relationships to some of these musicians to Lollapalooza '93 where their bands often collaborated on stage.

A wide variety of equipment was utilized for the recording of Boggy Depot. In terms of amplifiers, Cantrell used the Peavey 5150 head given to him by Eddie Van Halen as well as Marshalls, Fenders, and Soldanos. The band used a lot of old RAT pedals and an Electro-Harmonix distortion on "Jesus Hands". According to Cantrell, they also used "vintage crappy mikes" including one that Toby Wright bought for $20 at a pawn shop. Cantrell used largely the same guitars as he had in Alice in Chains, including the G&L Rampage, '52 Goldtop Les Paul, and old Stratocasters and Telecasters. He also bought Nancy Wilson's Les Paul Junior which he used heavily and satisfyingly played a new '50s-era Les Paul that Gibson sent him. Cantrell also intermixed guitars on certain songs; for instance, in "Dickeye", a Goldtop was used for the left channel while his white Les Paul reissue went on the right.

== Album title and artwork ==
Boggy Depot was named after the ghost town of the same name in Oklahoma. This is the area Cantrell's father grew up in. The album cover, photographed by Rocky Schenck, depicts a placid Cantrell covered in mud standing in a branch of Clear Boggy Creek, a place he sometimes visits to hunt or fish. He detailed the choice in an interview:

"As I was writing for the album, I actually made a few trips to Oklahoma. I would drive my truck down to the edge of the river where we shot the cover of the album. I wrote quite a few of the lyrics there. And I just had this [vision] of me with mud all over myself. It was kind of like an Apocalypse Now/Martin Sheen type of thing. It just fit the vibe of the stuff I was writing."

Cantrell also designed the album's artwork. The booklet photography centers around rural Oklahoma. This includes a photo of Cantrell sitting on a porch with his great uncle, Victor Lane. The disc itself depicts Cantrell with hooks attached to his face with surgical adhesive. Strings attached to the hooks are being pulled, morbidly stretching his face.

== Music ==
Rob Sheffield of Rolling Stone noted the influence of Led Zeppelin in several of the record's songs, opining that "Breaks My Back" sounds "exactly" like Zeppelin's "No Quarter" (1973) and noting that "Between" appears to quote the song title "Going to California" (1971). Writing in SPIN, Jane Dark described the song "Between" as a "simple-sweet Southern lope" with a "fat lift" reminiscent of the Who.

== Release and reception ==
Professional ratings
Review scores
| Source | Rating |
|---|---|
| AllMusic | 3/5 stars |
| Collector's Guide to Heavy Metal | 9/10 |
| Entertainment Weekly | C+ |

Originally scheduled to be in stores on March 24, 1998, Boggy Depot was pushed back to release on April 7, 1998. A special 2-record vinyl edition of the album was released on March 31, 1998. Boggy Depot debuted at No. 28 on the Billboard 200 album chart, selling more than 46,000 copies. The album stayed on the top 200 for 14 weeks.

The album received marginally positive and mixed reception from major publications. AllMusic's Stephen Thomas Erlewine estimated that Cantrell was a reluctant solo artist who would prefer his work to be published through Alice in Chains. However, Erlewine claimed, "everything that an Alice fan has loved [...] is here in spades." He detailed how guitar solos tend to drag songs too long and that, while Boggy Depot lacks the "psychological weight" of Dirt, it "comes close to replicating the sound." Rob Sheffield of Rolling Stone commended Cantrell's writing but gave a less enthusiastic review. He regarded it as the "same reliably hook-y '70s metal album that Alice in Chains always made" and "basically Alice in Handcuffs". Sheffield also claimed "'Breaks My Back' sounds exactly like Led Zeppelin's 'No Quarter' except it lasts eight seconds longer and fails to mention Thor. . . Nothing here would've sounded novel or Earth-shattering in 1978, let alone 1998, but Cantrell sure does know his trade."

Billboard described Boggy Depot as similar to Cantrell's work in Alice in Chains and considered it "an album that solidifies Cantrell's reputation as a singer/songwriter/performer in his own right."

In December 1999, The A.V. Club's Stephen Thompson listed Boggy Depot as a nominee for Least Essential Solo Album in his article "Least Essential Albums of the '90s". In April 2002, Thompson gave the album a mixed review, commending "My Song" and "Between" as the best tracks while regarding "Dickeye" and "Devil By His Side" as "pedestrian". He elaborated on the overall sound as "too much [...] like Alice in Chains minus a recognizable vocalist; in other words, a little bit like Creed and Days of the New." Thompson compared it to Scott Weiland's 12 Bar Blues as another "bad post-grunge solo album".

Jane Dark of SPIN was largely dismissive of Boggy Depot. Dark described the record as "tiresomely grown up" and to consist of "weary tunes sung so poorly you'd think it was indie rock". Despite praising the song "Between", Dark criticised the length of the songs (ranging from five to over eight minutes), stating that "this didn't work for Oasis and it doesn't work here".

== Touring and promotion ==
The promotion of Boggy Depot led to Jerry Cantrell's first concert experiences as a band frontman which he considered "intimidating". On June 24 in West Palm Beach, Florida, Cantrell began touring for the album with Days of the New and headlining act Metallica on their Poor Re-Touring Me Tour. For his lineup, Cantrell enlisted former Queensrÿche guitarist Chris DeGarmo, Old Lady Litterbug bassist Nick Rhinehart, former Fishbone keyboardist Chris Dowd, and Alice in Chains drummer Sean Kinney. The band also opened for Van Halen on their 1998 summer tour. Naturally, Cantrell's concert set featured songs by Alice in Chains, and he often closed with Pink Floyd's "Brain Damage/Eclipse".

Despite Cantrell's uneasiness towards performing as frontman, concerts were quickly met with praise by critics from the Los Angeles Times, Variety, and other major publications. The broad approval led Cantrell to schedule a headlining tour starting October 1 in Milwaukee, Wisconsin. Flight 16 filled the slot as his opening band.

"Cut You In" served as Boggy Depot's lead single and video which charted well and remained one of the album's best known songs. The track is unusual for Cantrell's style considering its use of horns. It was the number 1 most-added track at Rock and Alternative radio with more than 1,000 spins and an audience of more than nine million in its first five days. The second single, "My Song", was on Billboard's Mainstream Rock Tracks chart for over a dozen weeks. Its controversial music video was directed by Rocky Schenck and features performance artist Ann Magnuson. A third and final single, "Dickeye", also managed to chart albeit briefly.

On July 19, 1998, Cantrell was interviewed for the MTV program 120 Minutes which also aired the videos for "Cut You In" and "My Song".

== Awards and nominations ==
Billboard Music Video Awards

| Year | Nominee / work | Award | Result |
|---|---|---|---|
| 1998 | Cut You In | Best Hard Rock/Metal Clip | Nominated |
| 1998 | Cut You In | Best New Hard Rock/Metal Artist Clip | Nominated |

== Track listing ==
All tracks are written by Jerry Cantrell.

| No. | Title | Length |
|---|---|---|
| 1. | "Dickeye" | 5:07 |
| 2. | "Cut You In" | 3:23 |
| 3. | "My Song" | 4:07 |
| 4. | "Settling Down" | 6:12 |
| 5. | "Breaks My Back" | 7:07 |
| 6. | "Jesus Hands" | 5:37 |
| 7. | "Devil by His Side" | 4:50 |
| 8. | "Keep the Light On" | 4:49 |
| 9. | "Satisfy" | 3:35 |
| 10. | "Hurt a Long Time" | 5:41 |
| 11. | "Between" | 3:37 |
| 12. | "Cold Piece" | 8:29 |
| Total length: | | 62:34 |

== Personnel ==
Personnel taken from Boggy Depot liner notes.

Musicians

- Jerry Cantrell – vocals, guitars, piano, clavinet, organ, steel drums, production, artwork
- Rex Brown – bass (tracks 1, 3, 8–10)
- Mike Inez – bass (tracks 2, 6, 7)
- John Norwood Fisher – bass (tracks 4 and 5)
- Les Claypool – bass (tracks 11 and 12)
- Angelo Moore – horns (tracks 2 and 12)
- Sean Kinney – drums

Technicial personnel

- Toby Wright – production, engineer, mixer
- Scott Olson – assistant engineer
- Mike Cresswell – assistant engineer
- Rob Nordstrom – assistant engineer
- Sam Hofstedt – assistant engineer, mixing assistant
- Stephen Marcussen – mastering
- Ron Boustead – editing
- Brandy Flower – design
- Mary Maurer – art direction
- Rocky Schenck – photography

== Charts ==
| Chart (1994–1996) | Peak position |
|---|---|
| Canadian Top 100 CDs | 39 |
| UK Rock & Metal Albums (Official Charts) | 9 |
| US Billboard 200 | 28 |
| Chart (1998) | Peak position |
| Australian Albums (ARIA) | 25 |
| New Zealand Albums (RMNZ) | 46 |

Singles – Billboard (United States)

| Year | Single | Chart | Peak position |
|---|---|---|---|
| 1998 | "Cut You In" | Mainstream Rock Tracks | 5 |
| 1998 | "Cut You In" | Modern Rock Tracks | 15 |
| 1998 | "Dickeye" | Mainstream Rock Tracks | 36 |
| 1998 | "My Song" | Mainstream Rock Tracks | 6 |
