= The Incomparable Atuk =

1963 novel by Mordecai Richler

- First edition
- Author: Mordecai Richler
- Language: English
- Genre: Fiction
- Published: McClelland and Stewart, 1963
- Publication place: Canada
- Media type: Print (hardback and paperback)
- OCLC: 19973849

The Incomparable Atuk is a satirical novel by Canadian author Mordecai Richler. It was first published in 1963, by McClelland and Stewart. The novel was published as Stick Your Neck Out in the United States. The Incomparable Atuk tells the story of a Canadian Inuk, who is transplanted to Toronto and quickly adopts the greed and pretensions of the big city.

The novel satirized the Canadian cultural elites of Richler's day, who fetishize Atuk: first as a noble savage and then, when his corruption becomes apparent, as a symbol of Canadian nationalism and anti-American sentiment. Many of the characters are parodies of real Canadian celebrities, including Hugh Garner, Nathan Cohen, Pierre Berton, and Nathan Phillips.

A film adaptation was in the works from the mid-1980s to the beginning of the 1990s, but never materialized. The film, which would have been simply called Atuk, has been called cursed, as several actors associated with the film's development died, including John Belushi, Sam Kinison, John Candy, Michael O'Donoghue, Chris Farley, and Phil Hartman.

It also attracted the interest of other actors who have survived well beyond the film's ceased production, such as Will Ferrell, Jack Black, John Goodman, and Josh Mostel – as well as Jonathan Winters, who lived to age 87, dying in April 2013 – though some might claim the "curse" also indirectly led to the untimely death of Robin Williams, Winters' virtual protege.
