= Standing Outside a Broken Phone Booth with Money in My Hand =

1996 single by Primitive Radio Gods

Single by Primitive Radio Gods

from the album Rocket and The Cable Guy: Original Motion Picture Soundtrack
- B-side: "Feel Me"; "Mona Lisa"
- Released: March 18, 1996
- Studio: The Master Bedroom (Carlsbad, California)
- Genre: Alternative rock
- Length: 5:39
- Label: Columbia; Ergo
- Songwriters: Chris O'Connor; Leonard Feather; Jane Feather
- Producer: Chris O'Connor

Primitive Radio Gods singles chronology
| "Standing Outside a Broken Phone Booth with Money in My Hand" (1996) | "Motherfucker" (1996) |

Audio
- "Standing Outside a Broken Phone Booth with Money in My Hand" on YouTube

"Standing Outside a Broken Phone Booth with Money in My Hand" is a song by American alternative rock group Primitive Radio Gods. Their debut single, it was released from the soundtrack to the 1996 black comedy film The Cable Guy and was also included on the band's first album, Rocket. Its chorus consists of a sample from the 1964 B.B. King song "How Blue Can You Get", and the enigmatic lyrics of the song describe a troubling relationship in which two people cannot connect on an emotional level.

"Standing" was released in the United Kingdom on March 18, 1996, and was serviced to US radio on June 11, 1996. The song peaked at number one on the US Billboard Modern Rock Tracks and Triple A charts. It became a crossover radio hit over the following few months, reaching number two in Canada and number 10 on the Billboard Hot 100 Airplay chart. Primitive Radio Gods have not had another chart hit, making them a one-hit wonder. The success of the song bolstered sales for Rocket, helping it sell over 500,000 copies.

== Background ==
The song's title is a reference to the unrelated song "Outside a Broken Phone Booth with Money in My Hand" by Bruce Cockburn, from his 1978 album, Further Adventures Of. Primitive Radio Gods frontman Chris O'Connor stated that he was struggling to name his new song, so he picked up Further Adventures Of and adapted the title "Standing Outside a Broken Phone Booth with Money in My Hand" from it. Like the rest of Rocket, O'Connor recorded the song on an Ampex 16-track recorder inside a friend's garage. Afterwards, O'Connor tried to sign onto a record label, but none were interested. Several months later, he tried again by sending tapes of his songs to the labels, this time attracting the attention of Columbia Records, with whom he eventually signed.

== Composition ==
"Standing" is a modern rock song in which seemingly nonsensical lyrics describe a relationship between two partners who are unable to connect emotionally. The song starts with a quiet bass guitar and a clacking percussion beat, then transitions to the main instrumentation with a vocal sample from "How Blue Can You Get", a 1964 song by American singer-songwriter B.B. King. The sound of church bells can be heard intermittently throughout the song, and a piano solo constitutes the track's bridge. Toward the end of the song, O'Connor sings the sampled line of "How Blue Can You Get": "I've been downhearted baby / ever since the day we met".

== Reception ==
AllMusic critic Stephen Thomas Erlewine wrote "With its loping, unthreatening hip-hop beats and its looped B.B. King sample, 'Standing' had all the appeal of an adult novelty for most listeners—it was something that was out of the ordinary, to be sure, but not something that you would want to investigate much further."

== Track listings ==
UK 7-inch and cassette single

1. "Standing Outside a Broken Phone Booth with Money in My Hand"
2. "Feel Me"

UK maxi-CD single

1. "Standing Outside a Broken Phone Booth with Money in My Hand"
2. "Mona Lisa"
3. "Feel Me"

Australian maxi-CD single

1. "Standing Outside a Broken Phone Booth with Money in My Hand" (edit)
2. "Standing Outside a Broken Phone Booth with Money in My Hand" (album version)
3. "Mona Lisa"
4. "Feel Me"

== Credits and personnel ==
Credits are lifted from the UK maxi-CD single and US promo CD liner notes.

Studios

- Recorded at the Master Bedroom (Carlsbad, California)
- Mastered at Whitfield Street Recording Studios (London, England)

Personnel

- Chris O'Connor – writing, production
- Leonard Feather – writing ("How Blue Can You Get")
- Jane Feather – writing ("How Blue Can You Get")
- David Vaught – engineering
- Ray Staff – mastering
- Lisa Wright – photography

== Charts ==
=== Weekly charts ===
| Chart (1996) | Peak position |
|---|---|
| Australia (ARIA) | 31 |
| Canada Top Singles (RPM) | 2 |
| Canada Adult Contemporary (RPM) | 49 |
| Canada Rock/Alternative (RPM) | 1 |
| Scottish Singles Sales (Official Charts) | 80 |
| UK Singles (Official Charts) | 74 |
| US Hot 100 Airplay (Billboard) | 10 |
| US Adult Top 40 (Billboard) | 19 |
| US Mainstream Rock Tracks (Billboard) | 32 |
| US Modern Rock Tracks (Billboard) | 1 |
| US Top 40/Mainstream (Billboard) | 7 |
| US Triple A (Billboard) | 1 |

=== Year-end charts ===
| Chart (1996) | Position |
|---|---|
| Canada Top Singles (RPM) | 34 |
| Canada Rock/Alternative (RPM) | 13 |
| US Hot 100 Airplay (Billboard) | 40 |
| US Modern Rock Tracks (Billboard) | 12 |
| US Top 40/Mainstream (Billboard) | 41 |
| US Triple A (Billboard) | 6 |

== Release history ==
| Region | Date | Format(s) | Label(s) | Ref. |
|---|---|---|---|---|
| United Kingdom | March 18, 1996 | 7-inch vinyl; CD; cassette | Columbia; Ergo | |
| United States | June 11, 1996 | Contemporary hit radio | Columbia; Ergo | |
