= Leave Me Alone (Jerry Cantrell song) =

1996 single by Jerry Cantrell

Single by Jerry Cantrell

from the album The Cable Guy: Original Motion Picture Soundtrack
- Released: May 10, 1996
- Studio: Music Grinder Recording Studios, Hollywood, California
- Genre: Alternative rock
- Length: 5:14 (album); 4:25 (radio edit); 5:15 (2016 remix)
- Label: Sony Music Entertainment
- Songwriter(s): Jerry Cantrell
- Producer(s): Jerry Cantrell, Toby Wright

Jerry Cantrell singles chronology
"Leave Me Alone" (1996)	"Cut You In" (1998)

"Leave Me Alone" is the first solo song by American rock musician Jerry Cantrell, the guitarist/vocalist of the band Alice in Chains. It was originally featured on the soundtrack to the 1996 film The Cable Guy and was also the film's closing track. The song was released as a single and peaked at No. 14 on Billboard's Mainstream Rock Tracks chart. A remixed version of the song was included on Jerry Cantrell's 2016 digital EP My Song.

== Origin ==
Jerry Cantrell talked about the song to Guitar School magazine in August 1996:

I met with the director, Ben Stiller, at a video shoot in Los Angeles, and he asked me if I wanted to do something. I already had some material I had worked on prior to doing the Alice in Chains record, and when Ben heard it he said, 'That's great.' After that I went back and he listened to it, I realized that the lyrics kind of fit the vibe of the movie, which I hadn't planned on when I wrote them. The whole thing was just a good opportunity for me to do something else. We're not on tour right now, so why not?

== Reception ==
Stephen Thomas Erlewine of AllMusic wrote: "Jerry Cantrell's contribution [Leave Me Alone] rocks as hard as any Alice in Chains track".

== Music video ==
A black and white music video directed by Rocky Morton was released in June 1996 to accompany the single. It features Jerry Cantrell and drummer Sean Kinney performing while footage from The Cable Guy is displayed on a screen behind them. Jim Carrey also appears in the video coming out of a television screen haunting Jerry Cantrell.

The music video was included as a bonus feature on the 15th-anniversary edition Blu-ray of The Cable Guy in 2011.

== Chart positions ==
Chart (1996)	Peak Position
US Mainstream Rock (Billboard)	14

== Track listing ==
No.	Title	Length
1.	"Leave Me Alone (Radio Edit)"	4:25

== Personnel ==
- Jerry Cantrell – vocals, guitar and bass
- Sean Kinney – drums

Production

- Produced by Jerry Cantrell, Toby Wright
- Engineered by Darrell Peters, David Bryant
- Mixed by Toby Wright
