= Dickeye =

1998 single by Jerry Cantrell

Promotional single by Jerry Cantrell

from the album Boggy Depot
- Released: December 1998
- Recorded: April–November 1997
- Studio: Studio D, Sausalito, California; Record Plant, Sausalito, California; Paradise Sound, Index, Washington; Studio X, Seattle, Washington
- Genre: Alternative metal
- Length: 5:07
- Label: Columbia
- Songwriter: Jerry Cantrell
- Producers: Jerry Cantrell, Toby Wright

Jerry Cantrell singles chronology
"My Song" (1998)	"Dickeye" (1998)	"Anger Rising" (2002)

"Dickeye" is a song by American rock musician Jerry Cantrell. It was the third and final single from his 1998 debut album, Boggy Depot. "Dickeye" peaked at No. 36 on Billboard's Mainstream Rock Tracks chart.

== Personnel ==
- Jerry Cantrell – vocals, guitars
- Rex Brown – bass guitar
- Sean Kinney – drums

== Chart positions ==
Chart (1998)	Peak position
US Mainstream Rock (Billboard)	36
