= Sweet Venus =

Studio album by Primitive Radio Gods
- Released: May 4, 2006
- Recorded: 2005 & 2006
- Genre: Alternative rock
- Length: 30:19
- Label: Independent
- Producer: Primitive Radio Gods

Primitive Radio Gods chronology
Still Electric (2003)	Sweet Venus (2006)	Out Alive (2010)

Professional ratings
Review scores
Source	Rating
Tomatrax	4.5 tomatoes link

Sweet Venus is the Primitive Radio Gods' fourth album, released independently through their official site as a full-album download on May 4, 2006. Sweet Venus continues the shoegaze-influenced alternative rock the band started with their previous effort, Still Electric.

The name was inspired by Homer Simpson's gurgling utterance as he peeled a gummy off the babysitter's backside.

The song "Things You Can Drive" was #1 in the Tomatrax Top 100 of 2006.

== Track listing ==
1. "Planet 10" (3:14)
2. "Things You Can Drive" (3:13)
3. "Post Telecom Daydream" (2:38)
4. "Station to Life" (3:54)
5. "Inside" (3:34)
6. "Automatic" (4:34)
7. "Smoke to the Boss" (2:49)
8. "Empty Bars Protect Us" (2:48)
9. "Stars Align" (3:34)

=== 2016 Edition ===
In 2016, the track listing was changed. ("Sighs and Light" is a reworking of "Inside".)

1. "Planet 10" (3:14)
2. "Smoke to the Boss" (2:49)
3. "Post Telecom Daydream" (2:38)
4. "Sighs and Light" (3:34)
5. "Things You Can Drive" (3:13)
6. "Stars Align" (3:34)
7. "Automatic" (4:34)
8. "Station to Life" (3:54)
9. "Empty Bars Protect Us" (2:48)
