= Expanding Man =

- Genres: Rock; Hard rock Alternative rock
- Years active: 1987–2001
- Members: Aaron Lippert; Dave Wanamaker; Christopher Hancock; Bill Guerra; Peter Armata; Mike Piehl

Expanding Man was an alternative/hard rock formed in Long Island, New York in 1987. In 1992 it relocated to Boston and disbanded in 2001.

Expanding Man was formed by Aaron Lippert (vocals), Dave Wanamaker (guitar), Chris Hancock (drums) and Peter Armata (bass). In 1992, the group moved to the Boston area, where they were joined by second guitarist, Bill Guerra. After releasing Free T.V.s on a Boston area indie label, they were signed by Sony and recorded "Head to the Ground" with producer Mike Denneen. It was released on Columbia Records in 1996. The single "Download (I Will)" received considerable airplay on North American radio stations, reaching No. 22 on Billboard's Mainstream Rock Tracks chart, and was included (as track 14) on the soundtrack for the film The Cable Guy.

The group's first major release ended up being their last with Columbia. This was not at all due to any musical failure—the group's brand of tuneful, post-grunge, melodic rock was truly exceptional and perfectly tailored for radio play-lists, yet the group received little attention from the label despite their song-crafting and high profile support spots with the likes of '90s superstars Stone Temple Pilots.

After leaving Columbia in 1997, the band signed to Polydor (U.S.) and was joined by new drummer Mike Piehl. Working with Nick Gatfield (Polydor) and producer Matt Hyde, (Porno for Pyros, Monster Magnet) they recorded their sophomore effort entitled "Love and Disaster." The band recorded and delivered a highly polished rock album at a very precarious time in the music industry. In 1999, immediately following delivery of the album, Universal Music merged with Polygram and thinned their combined rosters. The band was dropped before the record was ever released and the label opted to keep the master recordings even though other labels were eager to sign the band and release the new album. The band dissolved soon thereafter. In 2009, Universal agreed to return the masters to the band and the album was subsequently released online October 2010.

== Discography ==
=== Albums ===
Album information
Free T.V.s: Studio album; Released: 1994 (Criminal Records, Inc.)
| Head to the Ground: Studio album; Released: August 27, 1996 (Columbia Records) |
Love and Disaster: Studio album; Released: October 29, 2010 (Self-Released)
