= Atuk =

American screenplay

Atuk (Inuit for "Grandfather") is the name of an unfilmed American screenplay, intended to be a film adaptation based upon the 1963 novel The Incomparable Atuk, by Canadian author Mordecai Richler. It is essentially a fish out of water comedy of a proud, mighty Inuk hunter trying to adapt to life in the big city with satirical elements on racism, materialism, and popular culture.

Peter Gzowski's afterword adds some historical context, and elaborates on the satirized real-life counterparts of several of the novel's minor characters, including Pierre Berton. A film adaptation was planned in the beginning of the 1970s by Norman Jewison, who purchased the film rights. Another adaptation was to have been shot in 1988. Although numerous Hollywood film studios have shown an interest in producing the film over the years, it remains unfilmed and the entire project is in development hell.

An urban legend claims that a curse has killed all the actors who have shown an interest in the lead role. These include John Belushi, Sam Kinison, John Candy and Chris Farley and even others who were planning to be in the film or associates of the late leads who had read the script in their presence, such as Michael O'Donoghue and Phil Hartman.

== Plot ==
In the novel, Atuk is a Canadian Inuit poet from Baffin Island who gets transplanted to Toronto, while in the proposed film screenplay, Atuk is a native of Alaska who ends up in New York City. In the film adaptation, Atuk was to be the son of an Inuk woman and a missionary who dreams of seeing the world outside of the Inuit territory of Alaska.

He sees his chance when a beautiful documentarian named Michelle Ross and her crew, arrive to film the village he lives in. Atuk stows away in Michelle's plane when her crew takes off from another village, after the crew lands in Canada. Michelle has no choice but to take Atuk with her past the border and into America.

The two end up at Michelle's destination, New York City. Meanwhile, powerful real estate mogul Alexander McKuen is planning to erect a massive metropolis on top of Alaska's wilderness called The Emerald. McKuen is clashing with environmentalists over the project, because they claim the city will poison the ecosystem there.

McKuen is also having problems with his sixteen-year-old son Bishop, an underage drinker and smoker who is a terror at his school. Bishop goes joyriding in his boat while he is supposed to be punished, and crashes near the pier where Atuk is and begins to drown. Atuk jumps in and saves Bishop, who befriends Atuk, and takes him out for a night on the town. Alexander decides to have Atuk stay at their mansion until they can put him up in one of their hotels, something McKuen's wife Vera objects to.

McKuen reveals to Atuk that Michelle works for him, and tells Atuk he wants him to be a part of an image campaign for McKuen's project; Atuk accepts. Bishop is sent off to military school, and is angry at Atuk for having sold out to his father. Michelle and Atuk travel back to Alaska to shoot the commercials for McKuen's Emerald project, in an attempt to reassure the environmentalists who are critical of the project.

Atuk is put into dark makeup and is put through primitive Inuit paces, which makes him feel unnatural, but as they work together, Atuk and Michelle realize that they like each other very much. At a viewing of the commercial, Atuk realizes that by editing, McKuen has used him to sell his message.

Atuk, now knowing that he's been taken advantage of, breaks Bishop out of the military academy and, using a dog sled, hurries to a hearing about plans for The Emerald and convinces everyone there that he was wrong to endorse McKuen's plans because the project will be bad for the land. With all of the investors for the project pulled out, McKuen and Bishop reconcile. Atuk returns to his village, but the next day Michelle arrives in a plane asking him to go to Hawaii with her.

Atuk accepts and the two fly off in the plane, with Bishop in the co-pilot's seat.

== Development ==
Norman Jewison purchased the rights to a film adaptation in 1971. Jewison planned to shoot it in Canada after Jesus Christ Superstar. John Belushi first read the role of Atuk in the beginning of 1982. He immediately expressed interest in the project and was set to play the character on screen when only months later, on March 5, he was found dead in his room at the Chateau Marmont in Hollywood, California.

Atuk next began production in Toronto in February 1988. Production halted after eight days. Sam Kinison said that his manager, Elliot Abbott, promised him creative control without clearing it with the studio. When Kinison attempted to rewrite the script, Abbott said that the studio tried to accommodate him, but Kinison grew difficult. Abbott and Kinison later severed their relationship.

United Artists filed a lawsuit against Kinison in February 1988, in which they said that Kinison threatened to intentionally give a substandard performance. Producer Chuck Roven briefly attempted to find a new lead but eventually gave up. Subsequent actors to take an interest in the role include John Candy and Chris Farley, both of whom died before the film could be made. Scriptwriter Tod Carroll dismissed rumors of a curse in February 1999.

It also attracted the interest of other actors who have survived well beyond the film's ceased production, such as Will Ferrell, Jack Black, John Goodman, and Josh Mostel – as well as Jonathan Winters, who lived to age 87, dying in April 2013 – though some might claim the "curse" also indirectly led to the untimely death of Robin Williams, Winters' virtual protege.

== See also ==
- A Confederacy of Dunces
