= The Chris Farley Show =

Recurring Saturday Night Live sketch featuring Chris Farley

The Chris Farley Show was a recurring sketch on the American comedy TV series Saturday Night Live, which involved cast member Chris Farley, as a parody of himself, interviewing various celebrities. Rather than ask his guest questions that had any popular significance, or allow his guest to plug a current project, he would invariably act nervously, and simply describe scenes from a film in which the guest actor appeared (or occasionally films that had nothing to do with the guest). After asking the performer whether he remembered this particular event, Farley would relate, "That was awesome." Other times, he would ask questions that were of little relevance, or made no sense at all. Invariably, he would say something he regretted and would smack his head and call himself an idiot. The sketch accentuated Farley's shyness for comic effect.

== Sketches ==
Guest	Original Air Date
Jeff Daniels	October 5, 1991
Martin Scorsese	November 16, 1991
Paul McCartney	February 13, 1993

=== Jeff Daniels ===
Jeff Daniels was the first guest of The Chris Farley Show when it premiered on October 5, 1991. Daniels was appearing to promote his newest movie, The Butcher's Wife. Daniels gives mostly yes or no answers to Farley's questions regarding whether or not he remembers certain scenes of movies. The episode also features a question from a caller, who mimics Farley's "d'you remember" questions. Eventually, Farley and the caller ignore Jeff Daniels and reminisce about the previous episode, in which the same caller asked Arnold Schwarzenegger a question.

=== Martin Scorsese ===
Martin Scorsese was the second guest on the show. Originally aired on November 16, 1991, Scorsese appeared to promote his film Cape Fear. As with the first sketch, Farley introduces himself, stumbles over his words, and eventually discusses action movies with his guest before taking a caller. The caller asks Scorsese a question germane to filmmaking, but Farley remarks she called in before, on an unseen show where he interviewed Bruce Willis. The conversation steers back to action films, in this case a minor scene from Die Hard, where Farley was impressed that John McClane had to make his way across a floor full of broken glass without shoes.

=== Paul McCartney ===
In the third and final Chris Farley Show sketch aired on February 13, 1993, Paul McCartney, that night's musical guest, was the guest on Farley's show. Farley acted awestruck and giddy in the former Beatle's presence, repeatedly asking ridiculous questions, starting with "Do you remember when you were in The Beatles?" or "That was a hoax, right?" in reference to rumors of McCartney's death, to which he gives one (or few) word answers.

== Biography title ==
A biographical novel named after the sketch, The Chris Farley Show: A Biography in Three Acts was released on May 6, 2008, and was co-written by Tom Farley, Jr. (Chris Farley's brother) and Tanner Colby. It features anecdotes provided by his friends and family. Plans to develop the book into a biopic were announced in 2024.

== See also ==
- Recurring Saturday Night Live characters and sketches
