= Manmade Sun =

Studio album by Primitive Radio Gods
- Released: December 26, 2016
- Genre: Alternative rock, psychedelic rock, shoegazing
- Length: 43:20
- Label: Independent
- Producer: Primitive Radio Gods

Primitive Radio Gods chronology
| Out Alive (2010) | Manmade Sun (2016) | Untitled Final LP (2020) |

Manmade Sun is the sixth studio album by Primitive Radio Gods, their fourth record released independently through their official website.

== Track listing ==
| No. | Title | Length |
|---|---|---|
| 1. | "New Day Job" | 4:15 |
| 2. | "Fast Lane Overload" | 4:08 |
| 3. | "Notes from the Afterlife" | 5:42 |
| 4. | "On a Clear Day You Can Almost See the Ocean" | 3:09 |
| 5. | "Across the Open Feel" | 2:42 |
| 6. | "Permission" | 3:50 |
| 7. | "Year of the Moth" | 1:47 |
| 8. | "You and Me Are Free" | 2:21 |
| 9. | "Timmy's Jimmy" | 2:27 |
| 10. | "Blue Silver and Green" | 5:39 |
| 11. | "Into the Waiting Car" | 3:53 |
| 12. | "Big Black V" | 3:35 |
| Total length: | | 43:20 |

Notes

- "Into the Waiting Car" was previously released as "Normalizer" on the first edition of Still Electric.
- "Permission" was titled "When You Whisper" on the initial digital release.
