= My Song (Jerry Cantrell song) =

Single by Jerry Cantrell

from the album Boggy Depot
- Released: May 1998
- Recorded: April–November 1997
- Studio: Studio D, Sausalito, California; Record Plant, Sausalito, California; Paradise Sound, Index, Washington; Studio X, Seattle, Washington
- Genre: Alternative rock
- Length: 4:07
- Label: Columbia
- Songwriter: Jerry Cantrell
- Producers: Jerry Cantrell, Toby Wright

Jerry Cantrell singles chronology
"Cut You In" (1998)	"My Song" (1998)	"Dickeye" (1998)

"My Song" is a song by American rock musician Jerry Cantrell. It was the second single from his 1998 debut album Boggy Depot. "My Song" spent 21 weeks on Billboard's Mainstream Rock Tracks chart and peaked at No. 6.

== Release and reception ==
"My Song" was released as the second single from Boggy Depot in May 1998. The single spent 21 weeks on Billboard's Mainstream Rock Tracks chart and peaked at No. 6 on August 15, 1998. A streaming EP of "My Song" was released on May 6, 2016.

Beth Winegarner of MTV said of the song; ""My Song" is one of the lovelier tunes here, and is most reminiscent of the pure Alice in Chains sound. Cantrell's harmonized chorus is an irresistible sing-along, even in its devastating refrain: "Every time you let it show/I didn't want to know/By the time I had lost my soul/You had to go." The track begins as a ballad but brews into a real rocker midway through, building on Cantrell's layers of edgy and chiming guitars."

== Music video ==
A music video directed by Rocky Schenck was made to accompany the single. The video was shot on location in Los Angeles on June 6 and 7, 1998. Schenck told that the record company was very upset with him about the concept of the video, telling him that it would never play on MTV. Cantrell supported Schenck throughout the project and it was filmed as planned.

The video features Cantrell being held captive and tied up in a basement by a woman (played by Ann Magnuson) who tortures him. Toward the end of the video, however, Cantrell breaks out of the basement and makes a run for it with the woman in hot pursuit. There is a second version of the video, a bit racier than the edited version that aired on MTV.

== Track listing ==
1998 CD Single

1. "My Song" – 4:07
2. "Callout Hook" – 0:10
3. "Callout Hook" – 0:08

2016 Streaming EP

1. "My Song" – 4:07
2. "Leave Me Alone (Remix)" – 5:15
3. "Cut You In" – 3:23

== Personnel ==
- Jerry Cantrell – vocals, guitars
- Rex Brown – bass guitar
- Sean Kinney – drums

== Chart positions ==
Chart (1998)	Peak position
US Mainstream Rock (Billboard)	6
