= Cut You In =

1998 single by Jerry Cantrell

Single by Jerry Cantrell

from the album Boggy Depot
- Released: January 1998 (Radio); March 10, 1998 (CD single)
- Recorded: April–November 1997
- Studio: Studio D, Sausalito, California; Record Plant, Sausalito, California; Paradise Sound, Index, Washington; Studio X, Seattle, Washington
- Genre: Alternative metal, hard rock
- Length: 3:23
- Label: Columbia
- Songwriter: Jerry Cantrell
- Producers: Jerry Cantrell, Toby Wright

Jerry Cantrell singles chronology
"Leave Me Alone" (1996)	"Cut You In" (1998)	"My Song" (1998)

"Cut You In" is a song by American rock musician Jerry Cantrell. It was the lead single from his 1998 debut solo album Boggy Depot. The song is arguably the album's best known track and spent 23 weeks on Billboard's Mainstream Rock Tracks chart, peaking at No. 5. It also spent 15 weeks on the Alternative Songs chart and peaked at No. 15. In its first five days, "Cut You In" was the #1 most added track at Rock and Alternative radio with more than 1,000 spins and an audience of more than nine million. The song received airplay on major New York City and Los Angeles radio stations who, in anxious anticipation, jumped the record's official release date. On Billboard's list of Top Mainstream Rock Songs of the Decade, the song ranked at No. 16 for the year of 1998.

== Lyrics ==
On the April 18, 1998 issue of Billboard magazine, Jerry Cantrell said of the song:

The song is directed at the type of folk who ride with you when shit is good. But when your situation turns south, they're the first to bail–unlike true friends.

== Overview ==
Considering his previous work in Alice in Chains, "Cut You In" could be deemed unusual for Cantrell's style with its heavy use of horns performed by Angelo Moore of Fishbone. The track also includes Mike Inez on bass and begins with an acoustic guitar chord progression soon accompanied by quiet harmonized vocals. However, a little ways in, the song suddenly bursts into a loud chorus filled with shouted vocals, heavy guitar, and horns. It continues this shift from a quiet acoustic verse to a booming chorus. Cantrell recalled in an interview:

"I was pretty hammered when I wrote that tune - I just started humming this thing I had in my head, and I grabbed this guitar I made in high school - it's a white Strat that I call Embo. Anyway, I grabbed the guitar and wrote it out in about 20 to 30 minutes."

The song lyrically makes reference to drug users and their poor loyalty to one another. Rob Sheffield of Rolling Stone called the song a "brutal drug-buddy farewell."

== Music video ==
An award-nominated music video directed by Peter Christopherson was made to accompany the single and debuted on MTV's 120 Minutes on March 15, 1998. The video features no musical performance, other than Cantrell's singing. It begins with a middle-aged man driving a 1972 Dodge Challenger down a Southwestern highway only to find Cantrell standing alone. The man picks up Cantrell, who remains laid back with one foot out the passenger window while turning the car's radio dial. They stop at a truck flipped on the side of the road, and the concerned driver hurries over to the vehicle for inspection. Cantrell, remaining seated, then takes the wheel and drives off with the man's car as the song's explosive chorus begins. He intentionally drives toward a semi-truck head-on before swerving away and stopping at a gas station.

Cantrell speaks to an attractive woman outside and enters the store, passing drummer Sean Kinney at the doorway. Another man, clearly played by Kinney with a fake mustache and sideburns, begins inspecting Cantrell's stolen car and steals it with the woman. Cantrell exits the store just in time to jump in as well. They travel to a small town where the car's constant high speed and swerving causes a small vehicular catastrophe at the dismay of observing townspeople.

The trio make their way to a roadblock created by two state patrol cars. The sheriff is played by Cantrell's father. Kinney and the woman surrender to the police and are quickly apprehended. However, Cantrell, hidden in the backseat, sneaks up to the driver's seat and takes off once again. A police chase ensues through the desert until Cantrell tosses an explosive out the window, creating a large fireball. This confuses and ultimately stops the officers who appear to think it was Cantrell's vehicle that exploded. A final shot reveals Cantrell standing alone in the desert sunset.

After hosting an online chat with Cantrell on July 22, 1998, MTV held the "Jerry Cantrell's Muscle Car Madness" contest. As a result, the winner was awarded the '72 Challenger used in the "Cut You In" video. She also won a free trip to Los Angeles to meet Cantrell backstage.

The "Cut You In" music video was nominated for Best Hard Rock/Metal Clip and Best New Hard Rock/Metal Artist Clip by the 'blue ribbon panels' of the 1998 Billboard Music Awards. Cantrell was scheduled to present an award at the ceremony but canceled in favor of his rescheduled, previously canceled tour dates.

== Reception and award nominations ==
Virtually all major editorial reviews of Boggy Depot commended the album's lead single. Allmusic's Stephen Thomas Erlewine chose "Cut You In" as the sole AMG Pick off the album while Billboard called the song "propulsive." In direct response to the song, Rolling Stone's Rob Sheffield commented that "[Cantrell's] songwriting has its moments." and Marc Weingarten of Guitar World and called it "a twisted samba." In relation to Cantrell's previous work, Aidin Vaziri of the San Francisco Chronicle called "Cut You In" "the next best thing to an Alice in Chains B-side."

== Personnel ==
- Jerry Cantrell – vocals, guitars
- Mike Inez – bass guitar
- Sean Kinney – drums
- Angelo Moore – horns

== Chart positions ==
Chart (1998)	Peak position
Canada Rock/Alternative (RPM)	8
US Mainstream Rock (Billboard)	5
US Alternative Airplay (Billboard)	15
