= White Hot Peach =

Studio album by Primitive Radio Gods
- Released: October 24, 2000
- Recorded: 1999–2000
- Genre: Alternative rock
- Length: 38:35
- Label: What Are Records?
- Producer: Chris O'Connor

Primitive Radio Gods chronology
Rocket (1996)	White Hot Peach (2000)	Fading Out (2001)

Professional ratings
Aggregate scores
Source	Rating
Metacritic	75/100
Review scores
Source	Rating
AllMusic	3/5 stars
PopMatters	(favorable)

White Hot Peach is the second studio album by Primitive Radio Gods, released on October 24, 2000. Quite different in sound from their previous album Rocket, White Hot Peach features much less of the sampling that made the band famous. Most of the material from this album is from Mellotron On!, the album the band planned on releasing through Sire Records in 1999, but could not due to that label's bankruptcy.

== Track listing ==
No.	Title	Writer(s)	Length
1.	"Message from Steven"	Chris O'Connor, Jeff Sparks	2:16
2.	"Ghost of a Chance"	O'Connor, Sparks	3:30
3.	"Gotta Know Now"	O'Connor, Sparks	2:56
4.	"Blood from a Beating Heart"	Luke McAuliffe, Sparks	3:02
5.	"Fading Out"	O'Connor, Sparks	3:52
6.	"Devil's Triangle"	Sparks	2:01
7.	"First Alien Photo"	O'Connor, Sparks	2:37
8.	"Wayward Pilot's Mission"	O'Connor, Sparks	3:56
9.	"Skin Job"	O'Connor, Sparks	4:22
10.	"Motor of Joy"	O'Connor, Sparks, McAuliffe, Lauterio	3:24
11.	"Whatever Wakes McCool"	O'Connor, Sparks, McAuliffe, Lauterio	6:40
Total length:			38:36
