= Barry E. Jackson =

American production designer and writer (born 1954)

Barry Edward Jackson
- Born: May 18, 1954 (age 71); Omaha, Nebraska, U.S.
- Occupation(s): Production designer, author
- Spouse: Patricia Doktor
- Children: 2

Barry Edward Jackson (born May 18, 1954) is an American production designer and writer.

== Early life ==
Jackson was born in Omaha, Nebraska on May 18, 1954, to Alice and Loren Jackson. He was raised in Lompoc, California and graduated from Art Center College of Design in Pasadena, California in 1977.

== Career ==
=== Illustration ===
Jackson began his career as an album cover designer and commercial artist. He designed album covers for artists such as Neil Young, The Grateful Dead, The Band, and ZZ Top. He created the theatrical release posters for films such as Escape from New York, Terror Train, Street Trash, and Alligator. Jackson created the box art for the Wasteland video game.

=== Film ===
Jackson entered the film industry to work on Ralph Bakshi's animated feature film Cool World. In 2001 he production designed the all-digital animated short film Los Gringos, which was critically reviewed and praised in Entertainment Weekly. He was one of several production designers on the DreamWorks production Shrek. In 2023, he posted the original 1997 test animation for Shrek on his YouTube channel. In 2010, he was nominated for an Annie Award for Best Production Design in an Animated Television Production for his work on Firebreather.

His other screen credits include films such as American Pop, The Prince of Egypt, The Nightmare Before Christmas, Titan AE, The Ant Bully, Horton Hears a Who!, How the Grinch Stole Christmas and Sausage Party.

=== Books ===
HarperCollins released Jackson's first children's book, Danny Diamondback, in 2008. The book is dedicated to his daughter Rachel. Jackson provided illustrations for the picture book Bedtime for Little Bulldozer.
