= Primitive Radio Gods =

American alternative rock band

- Origin: Ventura, California, United States
- Genres: Alternative rock; indie rock; shoegaze (later)
- Years active: 1985–1991 (as The I-Rails); 1991–1994 (O'Connor solo); 1996–present
- Labels: Columbia; London-Sire; What Are Records?
- Members: Chris O'Connor; Tim Lauterio; Luke McAuliffe
- Past members: Jeff Sparks
- Website: primitiveradiogods.info

Primitive Radio Gods is an American alternative rock band from Southern California. Current members consist of frontman Chris O'Connor, who performs vocals and bass guitar; percussionist Tim Lauterio; and Luke McAuliffe, who contributes various additional instrumentation (guitars, violins, piano) as well as much of the art that has appeared on the band's albums and website. Former member Jeff Sparks wrote, sang, and played bass before leaving the band to pursue other music projects in 2001.

The band is best known for their 1996 hit "Standing Outside a Broken Phone Booth with Money in My Hand", which peaked No. 1 on the Billboard Alternative Songs chart.

== History ==
=== Early years (1991–1994) ===
The history of the Primitive Radio Gods begins with The I-Rails. Formed in the late 1980s, The I-Rails were an independent alternative rock band based in Oxnard, California. Consisting of three members, bassist and singer Chris O'Connor, guitarist Jeff Sparks (a childhood friend of O'Connor), and drummer Tim Lauterio, The I-Rails released a total of four albums, none of which received much public attention. After the fourth album, Panharmonium, was released in 1990 and similarly ignored, the band decided to split. While Sparks and Lauterio went on to pursue other potential careers, O'Connor continued to work with material originally intended for a fifth I-Rails album. Inspired by bands such as Public Enemy, O'Connor recorded additional material and ultimately mixed a total of ten tracks. After mastering, O'Connor released the demo to public music stations under the (misspelled) moniker "Primative Radio Gods", a song on the I-Rails album Nine Songs from Nowhere.

== Discography ==
=== As The I-Rails ===
==== Studio albums ====
- Valentino Says (1987)
- Unfocused (1988)
- Nine Songs from Nowhere (1989)
- Panharmonium (1990)

==== Singles ====
- "Same Old Me / Everyone's in Love" (1988)

=== As Primitive Radio Gods ===
==== Studio albums ====
- Rocket (1996)- #36 US
- White Hot Peach (2000)
- Still Electric (2003)
- Sweet Venus (2006)
- Out Alive (2010)
- Manmade Sun (2016)
- Untitled Final LP (2020)

==== EPs ====
- Fading Out (2001)
- James of the Open Heart (2024)
- Six Songs from Somewhere - Acoustic Cinematic (2026)

==== Compilation albums ====
- Mellotron On! (1999/2003)
- Umpteen Spooks (2006)
- Motor of Joy (2006)
- Collected Works: 2000–2020 (2022)

==== DVD releases ====
- Still Electric: Interactive Video Album (DVD, 2003)

==== Singles ====
List of singles, with selected chart positions
Title	Year	Peak chart positions				Album
Title	Year	US Mod. Rock	AUS	CAN	UK	Album
"Standing Outside a Broken Phone Booth with Money in My Hand"	1996	1	31	2	74	Rocket
"Motherfucker"	1996	—	—	—	—	Rocket
"Fading Out"	2000	—	—	—	—	White Hot Peach
"Kingston"	2021	—	—	—	—	
