= David Yarovesky =

American filmmaker (born 1980)

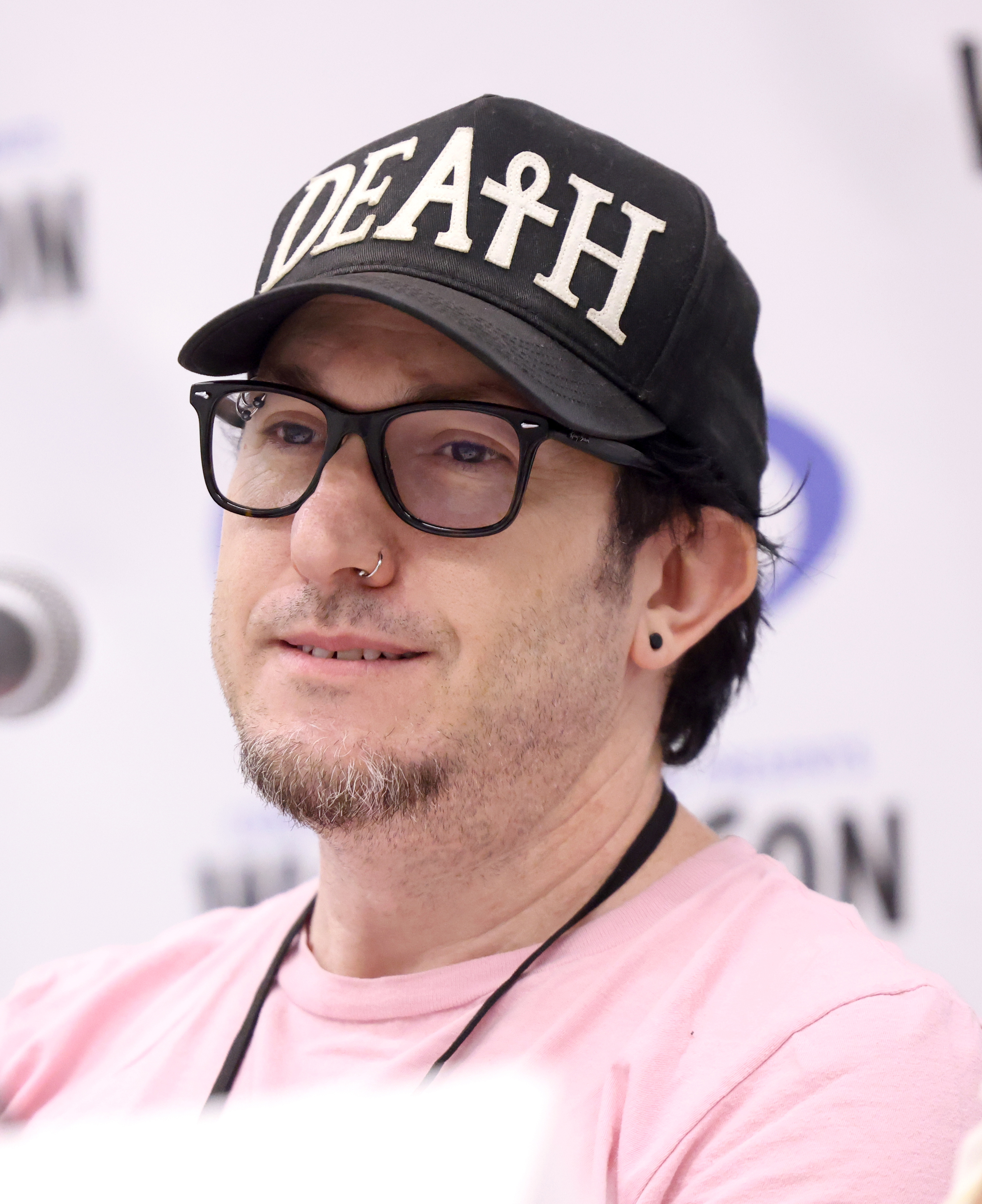
- Yarovesky in 2026
- Born: April 26, 1980 (age 46); Calabasas, California, U.S.
- Occupations: Film director; screenwriter; producer; editor; actor
- Years active: 2004–present
- Notable credit: Brightburn (2019)
- Spouse: Autumn Steed (m. 2018)

David Yarovesky (born April 26, 1980) is an American filmmaker. He gained recognition as a director after the success of his second feature film debut Brightburn (2019), which he made with James Gunn, Mark Gunn, and Brian Gunn.

== Early life and education ==
Yarovesky was born in Calabasas, California and attended Calabasas High School, where he wore several piercings and a "Gothic" style, which concerned his mother in the aftermath of the Columbine High School massacre. Yarovesky's mother later came to inspire his film Brightburn. He performed autodidacticism for film school, educating himself for acting and filmmaking.

== Career ==
Yarovesky started out by creating short films, with his first being Funny Thing Happened at the Quick Mart (2004), which he written and directed. His second was Ghild (2011), which won an Outstanding Achievement Award in Short Filmmaking at the Newport Beach Film Festival. Finally, he directed, produced, and edited Hell Halt No Fury (2015), which was his supposed "last short film".

In 2014, Yarovesky made his first feature-length film The Hive, a horror film. He then went on to direct Brightburn (2019), a superhero horror thriller film written by Brian Gunn and Mark Gunn, and co-produced by James Gunn.

== Filmography ==
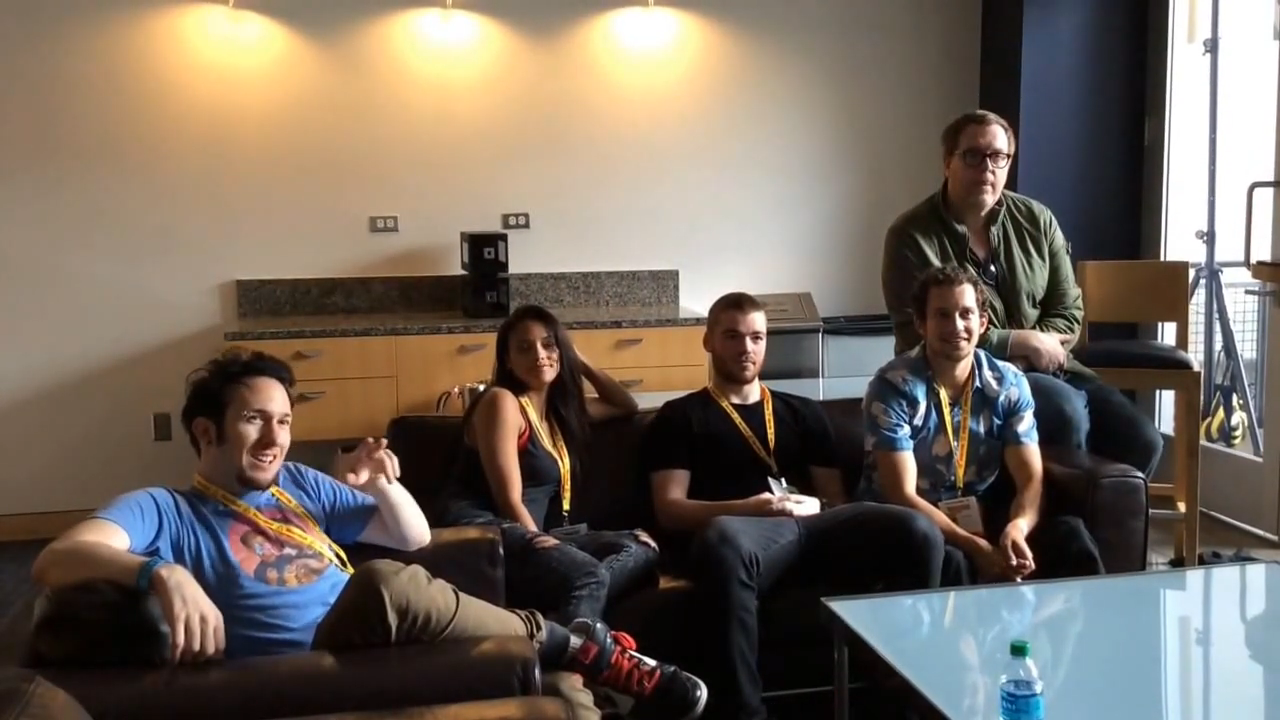
David Yarovesky discussing production on The Hive (2014) with Gabrielle Walsh, Gabriel Basso, Jacob Zachar, and Steve Agee.

=== Short film ===
Year	Title	Director	Writer	Producer	Editor
2004	Funny Thing Happened at the Quick Mart	Yes	Yes	No	No
2011	Ghild	Yes	Story	Yes	Yes
2015	Hell Halt No Fury	Yes	No	Yes	Yes

=== Television ===
Year	Title	Notes
2010–2013	Team Unicorn	Episodes "G33K & G4M3R Girls" and "For the Win"

=== Feature film ===
- The Hive (2014) (Also writer)
- Brightburn (2019)
- Nightbooks (2021)
- Locked (2025)

=== Music video ===
- Guardians Inferno – The Sneepers featuring David Hasselhoff (2017)
