= The Parts You Lose =

2019 film directed by Chris Cantwell

- Film poster
- Directed by: Christopher Cantwell
- Written by: Darren Lemke
- Produced by: Mark Johnson; Tom Williams; Aaron Paul; Kent Huang
- Starring: Aaron Paul; Scoot McNairy; Mary Elizabeth Winstead; Danny Murphy
- Cinematography: Evans Brown
- Edited by: Heather Persons
- Music by: Austin Fray
- Production companies: The H Collective; Gran Via Productions
- Distributed by: Samuel Goldwyn Films
- Release date: March 14, 2019 (Sun Valley Film Festival)
- Running time: 94 minutes
- Country: United States
- Language: English

The Parts You Lose is a 2019 American thriller film starring Aaron Paul and Danny Murphy as a fugitive criminal and a deaf boy who befriend one another. Mary Elizabeth Winstead and Scoot McNairy also star as the boy's parents. The film is directed by Christopher Cantwell based on a screenplay by Darren Lemke. The H Collective financed Gran Via's production of the film. Filming took place in Winnipeg, Canada. The Parts You Lose had its world premiere on March 14, 2019 at the 2019 Sun Valley Film Festival in Sun Valley, Idaho. Samuel Goldwyn Films released the film commercially in the United States on October 4, 2019.

== Synopsis ==
A deaf 10-year-old boy, Wesley, lives on a small farm in North Dakota and commutes to a school for the deaf. He is bullied at the school; at home, he has a good relationship with his mother, though not his father. One day he comes across an injured man who he helps recover, and they become friends. The man teaches the boy how to stand up to the school bully and his father. The police come looking for the man, and Wesley struggles with being loyal to his new friend.

== Cast ==
- Aaron Paul as The Man
- Danny Murphy as Wesley
- Mary Elizabeth Winstead as Gail
- Scoot McNairy as Ronnie
- Charlee Park as Amber

== Production ==
The Parts You Lose is directed by Christopher Cantwell based on a screenplay by Darren Lemke. The film's production is financed and overseen by The H Collective. The film originated in 2015 as a German-Canadian co-production based on a screenplay by Lemke and with Dutch director Paula van der Oest attached. Actor Aaron Paul was cast in May of that year, with filming scheduled to begin in the Manitoba province of Canada in the last few months of 2015. By November, Carice van Houten was also cast, with filming having been pushed back to the second quarter of 2016. Van der Oest and Van Houten eventually left the project; these changes and production delays postponed filming.

By June 2017, the production-financing entity The H Collective was launched with The Parts You Lose among a dozen films it began financing. By the following November, Cantwell was hired as the new director to film Lemke's script. British deaf actor Danny Murphy, who is fluent in British Sign Language, was cast as the deaf boy who befriends Paul's character. Murphy was cast after an international casting search, supported by Deaf West Theatre, for a hard of hearing actor. In the following December, actors Mary Elizabeth Winstead and Scoot McNairy were cast as the deaf boy's parents. McNairy had previously starred in the TV series Halt and Catch Fire (2014–2017), of which Cantwell was one of the creators and showrunners.

Principal photography started in Winnipeg in the Manitoba province of Canada on December 5, 2017. Since Murphy and his character use sign language, producers involved students and staff from Winnipeg's Manitoba School for the Deaf. Joanna Hawkins was hired as an American Sign Language consultant. Students and teachers were also filmed in scenes using sign language. Winstead previously worked with Paul on the 2012 film Smashed, but they had no scenes together due to separate filming.

By March 2018, The Parts You Lose was in post-production. By the following October, the film was officially finished.

== Release ==
The Parts You Lose had its world premiere on March 14, 2019 at the 2019 Sun Valley Film Festival in Sun Valley, Idaho. The film also screened at the Stony Brook Film Festival on July 26, 2019.

Samuel Goldwyn Films released The Parts You Lose on October 4, 2019. It had acquired United States distribution rights in the previous March.

== Reception ==
On the review aggregator website Rotten Tomatoes, 65% of 17 critics' reviews are positive, with an average rating of 6.4/10. Metacritic, which uses a weighted average, assigned the film a score of 47 out of 100, based on 6 critics, indicating "mixed or average" reviews.

Richard Roeper of the Chicago Sun-Times wrote, "Paul and young Danny Murphy are terrific together, with Paul playing a wounded bear growling his lines and Murphy delivering a fully realized performance. And for such a bleak and harsh tale, The Parts You Lose finds some rays of light at the end of the night." Frank Scheck of The Hollywood Reporter complained about the wasted dramatic potential of the film, "The Parts You Lose somehow manages to be both unmoving and tension-free, wasting the talents of several notable actors in the process."

== See also ==
- List of films featuring the deaf and hard of hearing
