= Zima =

Zima may refer to:

- Zima (drink), an alcoholic beverage
- Zima (town), a town in Russia
- Zima (surname)
- Zima Blue and Other Stories, a collection of short works by Alastair Reynolds
- Zima, a character in the anime series Chobits
- ZIMA, Zimbabwe Music Awards

== See also ==
- Zim (disambiguation)
