= Zimm =

Zimm may refer to:

- Bruno H. Zimm (1920–2005), American polymer chemist and DNA researcher
  - Zimm-Bragg model, a helix-coil transition model in statistical mechanics
- Bruno Louis Zimm (1867-1943) American sculptor
- Maurice Zimm (1909–2005), American radio, television and film writer
- ZentralInstitut für Mathematik und Mechanik, part of the German Academy of Sciences at Berlin, also known as the Academy of Sciences (ADW) of the German Democratic Republic de:Liste der Institute der Akademie der Wissenschaften der DDR
- Zimm., taxonomic author abbreviation for Albrecht Zimmermann (1860–1931), German botanist

== See also ==
- Zim (disambiguation)
