= Brightburn =

2019 American film by David Yarovesky

- Theatrical release poster
- Directed by: David Yarovesky
- Written by: Brian Gunn; Mark Gunn
- Produced by: James Gunn; Kenneth Huang
- Starring: Elizabeth Banks; David Denman; Jackson A. Dunn; Matt Jones; Meredith Hagner
- Cinematography: Michael Dallatorre
- Edited by: Andrew S. Eisen; Peter Gvozdas
- Music by: Tim Williams
- Production companies: The H Collective; Troll Court Entertainment
- Distributed by: Sony Pictures Releasing (under Screen Gems and Stage 6 Films)
- Release date: May 24, 2019 (United States)
- Running time: 90 minutes
- Country: United States
- Language: English
- Budget: $6 million
- Box office: $33.2 million

Brightburn is a 2019 American superhero horror film directed by David Yarovesky, written by Brian and Mark Gunn, and produced by James Gunn and Kenneth Huang, starring Elizabeth Banks, David Denman, Jackson A. Dunn, Matt Jones, and Meredith Hagner. It is a dark re-telling of the Superman origin story, in which Brandon Breyer, a young boy of extraterrestrial origin reared on Earth who discovers he has superpowers, uses them to abuse and murder, rather than to save lives. The film was financed by The H Collective, who produced with Troll Court Entertainment.

Brightburn was announced as "Untitled James Gunn Horror Project" in December 2017. Gunn produced the film, while his brother Brian and cousin Mark penned the screenplay, which adapts the concept of Superman for explicit horror. Principal photography began in March 2018 and wrapped in May of that same year.

Brightburn was released in the United States on May 24, 2019, by Screen Gems and Stage 6 Films. It received mixed reviews from critics, who praised its visual effects, acting performances, cinematography, humor, and score, but felt that it did not deliver on the full potential of its premise. The film grossed $33.2 million against a production budget of $6–12 million.

== Plot ==
A spaceship crashes in a forest in Brightburn, Kansas. Kyle and Tori Breyer, a couple struggling with infertility, witness the explosion from their house and investigate the crash site. They find the spaceship with a baby inside, whom they adopt and name Brandon.

On Brandon's 12th birthday, he discovers that he has super-strength and flight abilities. In middle school, Brandon is an academically exceptional student, despite being introverted and frequently bullied. Brandon begins to show interest in his classmate Caitlyn Connor, sneaking into her room at night and scaring her.

One day, during a trust exercise in physical education class, Caitlyn refuses to catch Brandon, and makes him fall to the ground, calling him a pervert. Humiliated by her accusation, Brandon crushes her hand, and is suspended from school after being accosted by Caitlyn's mother, Erika, who wants him arrested.

At night, the spaceship emits an otherworldly language that attracts Brandon to the barn. Tori follows, and sees him levitating, chanting the ship's alien message, before falling and accidentally cutting his hand on the wrecked ship. She reveals the truth of his origin, causing Brandon to declare his hatred of his adoptive parents and storm out of the house. Brandon deciphers the spaceship's message ("Take the world"), causing his evil identity to take over. As an act of revenge, Brandon uses his powers to torment and kill Erika at a diner.

Police discover a symbol drawn on all diner windows, made visible when the sheriff breathes on one of them while investigating Erika's disappearance. Brandon is seen drawing the same symbol in his notebook. Brandon visits his aunt's house to convince her to keep his incident at school a secret, but she refuses. Feeling rejected, Brandon begins to stalk her around the house but is caught by his uncle, Noah. After Noah threatens to tell his father about his behavior, Brandon toys with him before killing him by telekinetically lifting and dropping his truck as he tries to escape. Brandon reaches into the wreckage and dips his finger in his uncle's blood to draw the symbol on the pavement.

Tori and Kyle inform Brandon of Noah's death, which the police believe was an accident. Brandon attempts to dismiss his involvement. Suspecting he is the culprit, Kyle searches for evidence and finds Brandon's blood-stained shirt. He shows it to Tori, who refuses to believe Brandon is responsible. Kyle lures Brandon into the woods for a father–son hunting trip. He attempts to shoot Brandon with his hunting rifle, but the bullet bounces off the back of his head. Brandon retaliates and kills Kyle with heat vision.

The sheriff arrives at the Breyers' residence, showing Tori the symbol found at the scenes of Erika's and Noah's deaths, suggesting they are connected. Tori finds Brandon's notebook with drawings of his murders and the message, "Take the world." She calls Kyle, but Brandon answers, saying he is coming for her.

Brandon returns and begins destroying the house. Tori calls the police, but Brandon swiftly kills the officers before backup can arrive. Remembering that the ship's hull can harm him, Tori runs to the barn and discovers Erika's eviscerated body near the ship. Brandon pursues her into the barn. When he finds her, Tori tries to reassure the good side of Brandon. Using the time he is distracted to get close, she attempts to stab him with a metal piece of the ship, but Brandon anticipates the attack and catches her arm. Heartbroken and enraged by her betrayal, he takes her high up to the stratosphere and drops her to her death. After watching her fall, he notices an oncoming airplane.

The following morning, the airplane has crashed into the farmhouse, destroying evidence of the murders from the previous night. Brandon's symbol is seen painted on a piece of the plane's wreckage as rescue workers attend to him. In the credits, Brandon is seen in news reports at the locations of various disasters as an online conspiracy theorist points out the existence of other superpowered beings and urges the public to take action before it is too late.

== Cast ==
- Elizabeth Banks as Tori Breyer: Brandon's adoptive mother and Kyle's wife
- David Denman as Kyle Breyer: Brandon's adoptive father and Tori's husband
- Jackson A. Dunn as Brandon Breyer / Brightburn: a superpowered alien who is adopted by the Breyer family
- Meredith Hagner as Merilee McNichol: Tori's sister, Brandon's aunt and Noah's wife who works as Brandon's school counselor
- Matt Jones as Noah McNichol: Brandon's uncle and Merilee's husband
- Gregory Alan Williams as Sheriff Jerrold Deever: a local sheriff of the small town
- Anne Humphrey as Deputy Aryes: Deever's partner
- Emmie Hunter as Caitlyn Connor: a girl who is initially sympathetic to Brandon but later becomes scared of him
- Becky Wahlstrom as Erika Connor: Caitlyn's mother who believes Brandon is a menace
- Jennifer Holland as Ms. Espenschied: Brandon's school teacher
- Abraham Clinkscales as Royce: a young boy who bullies Brandon
- Christian Finlayson as Fauxhawk: one of the kids who bullies Brandon
- Steve Agee as EJ
- Stephen Blackehart as Travis
- Elizabeth Becka as Principal Elaine Susko
- Terence Rosemore as P.E. Teacher
- Mike Dunston as Reporter
- Michael Rooker as The Big T: a conspiracy theory blogger who reports on the super-powered beings

Rainn Wilson cameos in a photograph during the credits as his character Crimson Bolt from producer James Gunn's Super (2010).

== Production ==
=== Development ===
The film was announced in December 2017, then untitled, with James Gunn as a producer, his brother Brian and cousin Mark writing the script, and David Yarovesky directing; The H Collective was fully financing, and producing with James Gunn's Troll Court Entertainment banner. In March 2018, Elizabeth Banks, David Denman, Jackson A. Dunn, Meredith Hagner and Matt Jones were cast. Gunn was set to appear on a panel to discuss the project at San Diego Comic-Con in July 2018, but his appearance was canceled after news broke that Disney had fired Gunn as director of Guardians of the Galaxy Vol. 3 (2023) due to offensive tweets; Gunn would later be reinstated by that October, with his return publicly revealed in March 2019.

=== Filming ===
Principal photography began in March 2018 and wrapped in May of that year in the U.S. state of Georgia. The building collapse portion of the mid-credits scene uses footage taken from the real-life demolition of the Sir John Carling Building in Ottawa, Ontario, Canada, on July 13, 2014. The middle school scenes were shot at the now-defunct Patrick Henry High School in Stockbridge, Georgia, the same location used for both Hawkins Middle and Hawkins High Schools in the Netflix series Stranger Things.

== Release ==
=== Marketing ===
There were plans to promote the film at the 2018 San Diego Comic-Con in July, but it was pulled at the last minute in the wake of James Gunn's removal from the Walt Disney Studios and Marvel Studios, only for Disney and Marvel to reconcile with Gunn nine months later. On December 8, 2018, the first trailer for Brightburn was released online.

Critics viewed the trailer as an "Ultraman horror movie" due to the intentional similarities to Superman's origin story and as a deconstruction of the character. Fast Company stated that "although it's not officially a Superman movie, it walks viewers through every step of Clark Kent's origin story before taking a hard left turn".

On April 3, 2019, an art contest was launched after the release of the trailer to promote the film, and had concluded on May 20. The winners of the contest had their artworks used in marketing for the film, and received $2,000. On May 21, 2019, IGN promoted the film by uploading a prank of unsuspecting volunteers with the character Brandon Breyer. It was uploaded to their website and YouTube channel.

Another art contest was launched on August 5 to promote the home media release of the film titled "Band with Brightburn". Submissions had to depict other supervillains in reference to the ending scene of the film hinting at other superpowered characters. Actor Jackson A. Dunn was the judge of the contest, and it was sponsored by Collider.

=== Theatrical ===
Brightburn was released in the United States on May 24, 2019. It was originally scheduled for November 30, 2018. In the UK, a censored version of the film was released on June 19, 2019, the studio having reduced the level of violence to meet their preferred age certificate.

=== Home media ===
The film was released on Digital HD on August 6, 2019, and on DVD, Blu-ray, and 4K Ultra HD on August 20, 2019. In the UK, the Blu-ray release contained the theatrical censored cut of the film, while the 4K Blu-ray contained the uncut 18 certificate version.

In April 2021, Sony signed a deal with Disney giving them access to their legacy content, including Brightburn to stream on Disney+ and Hulu and appear on Disney's linear television networks. Disney's access to Sony's titles would come following their availability on Netflix. Brightburn had previously been available on Starz and FX.

=== Merchandise ===
In August 2019, it was announced a Halloween costume of Brandon Breyer was going to be sold exclusively by Spirit Halloween in October.

== Reception ==
=== Box office ===
Brightburn grossed $17.3 million in the United States and Canada, and $15.9 million in other territories, for a worldwide total of $33.2 million.

In the United States and Canada, Brightburn was released alongside Aladdin and Booksmart, and was projected to gross around $12–16 million from 2,607 theaters in its four-day opening weekend. The film made $3 million on its first day, including $950,000 from Thursday night previews. It ended up underperforming, grossing $7.8 million over three days (and $9.6 million over the four), finishing in fifth. In its second weekend the film made $2.3 million, dropping 70.5% and finishing in ninth.

=== Critical response ===
On Rotten Tomatoes, the film has an approval rating of 57% based on 206 reviews, with an average rating of 5.7/10. The website's critical consensus reads: "Although Brightburn doesn't fully deliver on the pitch-black promise of its setup, it's still enough to offer a diverting subversion of the superhero genre." On Metacritic, the film has a weighted average score of 44 out of 100, based on 31 critics, indicating "mixed or average" reviews. Audiences polled by CinemaScore gave the film an average grade of "C+" on an A+ to F scale, while those at PostTrak gave it 2.5 out of 5 stars and a "definite recommend" of 39%.

Frank Scheck of The Hollywood Reporter wrote: "While not exactly original, the premise is certainly effective enough. But Brightburn lacks the visual stylization or wit to elevate it from the realm of the crudely effective B-movie." James White from Empire wrote: "Crossbreeding superhero tropes with horror staples was an idea laden with promise. Brightburn is enlivened by trademark James Gunn black comedy, but hamstrung by sketchy writing and a botched sense of dread."

Alex Arabian from The Playlist wrote: "The film is a gem, especially for anyone yearning for a superhero film that gleefully torches the familiar 'good versus evil' formula and introduces far more sinister sensibilities."

Ed Gonzalez from Slant gave it a negative review: "The way the film shuttles through its 90 minutes, it's as if it's been stripped of its most crucial narrative parts."

== Possible sequel ==
In May 2019, director David Yarovesky stated that upon the film potentially being a success, the universe of Brightburn would be expanded upon. In a later interview with Collider, Yarovesky confirmed that the film's credits making reference to a half-man/half-sea creature terrorizing the seas, Rainn Wilson's character Frank Darbo/The Crimson Bolt from Super, and a powerful witch who chokes her victims with a rope was intended to set up a sequel, in addition noting that an alternate ending to the film featured Emmie Hunter's "Caitlyn—[ending] with her in a lab fastening a robot arm on her broken arm, and her just pissed off", as well as mentioning "tons" of other such endings as having been discussed, as well as stating that "[i]f we were to expand the Brightburn universe in other installments and in other ways, we would probably be doing it in the exact same way, in total secrecy and then drop a cinematic trailer at some point that kind of teases what that new direction may be".

In June 2019, James Gunn stated that discussion of a potential sequel was happening, but he was busy writing and directing Guardians of the Galaxy Vol. 3, as well as the DC Extended Universe (DCEU) film The Suicide Squad (2021). In August 2019, Jackson A. Dunn stated in an interview with Screen Rant that he would be interested in reprising his role as Brandon Breyer. In addition, Dunn said he would like to see up-and-coming actors being cast in lead roles in potential future films.

In April 2024, Gunn expressed doubt that a sequel would happen due to rights issues with the H Collective.
