= Richard Outten =

American screenwriter

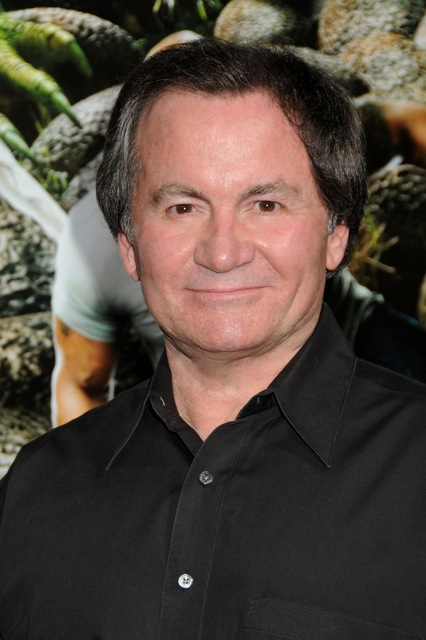
- Outten at the 2012 premiere of Journey 2: The Mysterious Island
- Born: United States
- Education: USC School of Cinematic Arts
- Occupation: Screenwriter
- Website: www.richardoutten.com

Richard Outten is an American screenwriter who works in both motion pictures and television. Among his writing credits is the 2012 Warner Bros. adventure film Journey 2: The Mysterious Island, starring Dwayne Johnson.

== Career ==
After receiving his MFA from the USC School of Cinematic Arts, he co-authored (with Chris Columbus) the screenplay to the award-winning animated film Little Nemo: Adventures in Slumberland. Other motion picture credits include Lionheart, helmed by Oscar-winning director Franklin J. Schaffner, and Pet Sematary Two.

Based on Outten's early work, Steven Spielberg selected him to do a rewrite of Gremlins 2: The New Batch. Although he didn't receive credit on the film, the assignment led to an exclusive multiyear writing deal at Warner Bros., during which he penned several screenplays, including an unproduced sequel to The Goonies.

Among the television series he has written for is the cult favorite The Adventures of Brisco County, Jr., which aired on the Fox Network. He also shared writing credit on Last Rites, an original TV movie for the Starz/Encore! pay cable network starring Randy Quaid.

In March 2009, Outten's original screenplay, Mysterious Travels, was acquired by Walden Media and New Line Cinema to serve as the basis for the 3-D sequel to Journey to the Center of the Earth (2008). He subsequently rewrote the script, customizing the story for the sequel. Titled Journey 2: The Mysterious Island, the film starred Michael Caine, Dwayne Johnson, Vanessa Hudgens, and Josh Hutcherson. Released by Warner Bros. in 2012, Journey 2 grossed $335 million at the box office worldwide.
