= James Gunn's PG Porn =

Web series

- Created by: James Gunn; Brian Gunn; Sean Gunn
- Developed by: James Gunn; Brian Gunn; Sean Gunn
- Written by: James Gunn; Brian Gunn; Terra Naomi
- Starring: Nathan Fillion; Aria Giovanni; Michael Rosenbaum; Belladonna; James Gunn; Sasha Grey; Jenna Haze; Joe Fria; Peter Alton; Sean Gunn; Craig Robinson; Bree Olson; Alan Tudyk; Ted Stryker
- Theme music composer: Tyler Bates
- Country of origin: United States
- Original language: English
- No. of series: 1
- No. of episodes: 8

Production
- Executive producer: James Gunn
- Producers: Stephen Blackehart; Peter Safran
- Production location: Los Angeles, California
- Editor: Peter Alton
- Running time: 2–5 min.
- Production companies: Safran Digital Group; The Good Boys Productions

Original release
- Network: Spike.com
- Release: October 8, 2008 – July 23, 2009

Related
- Du Hard ou du Cochon

James Gunn's PG Porn is a web series created by brothers James Gunn, Brian Gunn, and Sean Gunn. It consists of a series of pornography spoofs, with a humorous event occurring just before the supposed commencement of pornographic sexual acts. Each episode pairs a mainstream actor with a pornographic actress or model. The tagline is "For people who love everything about porn... except the sex."

== Production ==
The initial web episode premiered on Spike.com. Spike subsequently picked up the series for an additional 11 episodes.

According to Gunn, the idea was developed in the early 2000s, before short-term Internet-based sketch comedies became popular. Stephen Blackehart of The Good Boys Productions produced the show with Jake Zim and Peter Safran of Safran Digital Group (SDG) for Spike.com.

All episodes are directed by James Gunn and have a score by Tyler Bates. The fifth episode is not hosted on Spike.com. In James Gunn's words this was "because the head of Spike Network FREAKED OUT on the, uh, raunchiness of the content and pulled it down". The video was available on Gunn's website.

In 2010, French channel Canal+ produced a remake of the series, titled Du hard ou du cochon !.

== Episodes ==
| No. | Title | Directed by | Written by | Original release date |
|---|---|---|---|---|
| 1 | "Nailing Your Wife" | James Gunn | Brian Gunn | October 8, 2008 |
Amber Grimes visits a construction site where her husband Norman is the foreman. She meets construction worker Chris, who tells her that Norman took a trip to the lumberyard, having forgotten to meet Amber for lunch. Amber mopes about her husband's lacking sex drive and seduces Chris. As Amber is about to unbuckle his tool belt, Chris accidentally discharges his nailgun on her head, killing her. Chris leaves the nailgun at her hand to stage it as a suicide before escaping. Cast: Nathan Fillion as Chris, Aria Giovanni as Amber Grimes
| 2 | "Peanus" | James Gunn | James Gunn | December 18, 2008 |
In a Peanuts spoof, Charlie Braun arrives home and is greeted by Lucy, who has had sex with everybody they know, including her own brother Linus. Lucy proceeds to seduce the aroused Charlie, but before he could kiss her, she challenges him to kick a football. He excitedly goes to kick it but Lucy removes it at the last second, causing Charlie to stumble and hit his head on a rock. Revealed to be a prank by Lucy, the rest of the characters come out of the bushes to join Lucy in mercilessly laughing at him. Charlie vows revenge against Lucy. Cast: Michael Rosenbaum as Charlie Braun, Belladonna as Lucy, Tiffany Shepis as Sally, Mackenzie Firgens as Violet, Sean Gunn as Peppermint Patty, Elisa Eliot as Marcy, James Gunn as Linus, Stephen Blackehart as Pig-Pen, Lee Kirk as Schroeder, Dr. Wesley Von Spears as Snoopy
| 3 | "A Very Peanus Christmas" | James Gunn | James Gunn | December 22, 2008 |
Charlie and Lucy celebrate Christmas together. Lucy attempts to seduce Charlie but Charlie apologizes when his mom, unseen by the other characters, returns home drunk. As Charlie and Lucy begin having sex, the other characters spy on them and are aroused, causing them to have sex with one another. However, Lucy and the others see Charlie's overweight and vomit-stained mother for the first time. Charlie reveals that due to them seeing his mother, he has to kill them. He then brutally murders Lucy and his friends. Cast: Michael Rosenbaum as Charlie Braun, Belladonna as Lucy, Tiffany Shepis as Sally, Mackenzie Firgens as Violet, Sean Gunn as Peppermint Patty, Elisa Eliot as Marcy, James Gunn as Linus, Stephen Blackehart as Pig-Pen, Lee Kirk as Schroeder, Michael Q. Schmidt as Charlie's Mom, Dr. Wesley Von Spears as Snoopy
| 4 | "Roadside Ass-istance" | James Gunn | James Gunn | January 26, 2009 |
Tricia, a student at a Catholic high school, brings her broken-down car to Bang Bang Brake Jobs. The shop's mechanic, Lance, talks with Tricia in a sexually-charged, innuendo-filled conversation. However, he constantly turns down her offers for sex much to her confusion. After repairing her car, he instead asks for one of the free kittens Tricia has in her car as payment. The agitated Tricia accepts, but to her shock, Lance expresses his excitement to have sex with his kitten. Cast: James Gunn as Lance the Mechanic, Sasha Grey as Tricia Scrotey
| 5 | "Squeal Happy Whores" | James Gunn | James Gunn, Terra Naomi | February 17, 2009 |
At a porn shoot, Jenna Haze and Joey Bone are paired together. However, before they could begin, Joey breaks out into an extravagant musical number about the graphic ways they will have sex and how they will achieve orgasm, occasionally breaking the fourth wall to Jenna's frustration. After Joey finishes his song, he finds that Jenna has bailed on the shoot. He tearfully sings a sad song about turning to masturbate now that he is alone. Cast: Jenna Haze as herself, Joe Fria as Joey Bone, Peter Alton as Cameraman
| 6 | "Helpful Bus" | James Gunn | James Gunn | March 17, 2009 |
Three men in a van dubbed the "Helpful Bus" (a parody of the BangBros' Bang Bus) – Havana Bob, Jason, and their cameraman – pick up a blonde woman who is on her way to her grandmother's. Bob plays with the blonde's dress, arousing her, but they send her on her way when they arrive at her grandmother's place. Although the three act inappropriate around their customers, they are satisfied with simply helping them give free rides to their destination. They attempt to coerce three girls on the way to a party to their van, but the girls refuse when the men refuse to serve alcohol, citing open-container laws. They manage to bring two girls onboard, who make out with each other before attempting to have sex with the married Bob and the cameraman; the girls are thrown out the Helpful Bus instead. Cast: Sean Gunn as Jason, Bree Olson as Pretty Trashy, Craig Robinson as Havana Bob, Peter Alton as Cameraman, Mikaela Hoover as Julie, Marie Luv as Slutty Girl #1, Sarah Agor as Slutty Girl #2, Stephen Blackehart as Guido, Brian Gunn as Guy
| 7 | "High Poon" | James Gunn, Peter Alton | Brian Gunn | April 22, 2009 |
At a porn shoot, Alan Tudyk and Ted Stryker star as two cowboys attempting to have sex with a woman played by Belladonna. However, the demanding director James Gunn constantly calls cut to nitpick several aspects of Tudyk's performance and other details of the shoot. As they begin filming Belladonna removing Tudyk's pants, Tudyk reveals that he has no penis due to a birth defect. When Belladonna is shocked seeing this, Gunn assures her that it doesn't need to be perfect. She walks out in anger, and Gunn attempts to salvage the situation by drawing a penis on Tudyk's bottom. Cast: Alan Tudyk, Belladonna, James Gunn, Ted Stryker
| 8 | "Genital Hospital" | James Gunn | Brian Gunn | July 23, 2009 |
Bill Scrotey undergoes a physical examination by the attractive Dr. Poonwater. Poonwater seduces Bill and begins removing his pants. She seductively tells him that she feels something "big" under his boxers, but solemnly informs him that he has testicular cancer and he has six months to live. Bill cries from his diagnosis while Poonwater writes her findings nearby. Cast: Sean Gunn as Bill Scrotey, Belladonna as Dr. Poonwater
