= Matt Gunn =

American writer and actor

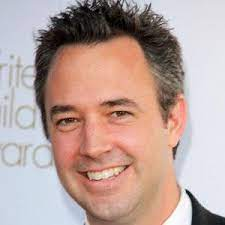
- Born: Matthew Gunn; April 22, 1972 (age 54); St. Louis, Missouri, U.S.
- Occupations: Writer; actor
- Spouse: Michelle Martin
- Children: 2
- Relatives: James Gunn (brother); Brian Gunn (brother); Sean Gunn (brother); Patrick Gunn (brother); Mark Gunn (cousin)

Matthew Gunn (born April 22, 1972) is an American writer and actor from St. Louis, Missouri.

== Early life ==
Gunn has four brothers: filmmaker James Gunn, screenwriter Brian Gunn, actor Sean Gunn, and Patrick Gunn, a former executive vice president of Artisan Entertainment. He also has a sister, Beth. His parents are Leota and James F. Gunn, a lawyer.

Gunn attended Saint Louis University High School, a Jesuit school in St. Louis, graduating in 1990.

== Career ==
In 1997, Gunn co-directed the short film Man About Town with Kris Isaacson. The film received special recognition in short filmmaking at the Sundance Film Festival.

Gunn played Dan McMahon in the 2003 short film The Man Who Invented the Moon.

Gunn worked as a writer on HBO's Real Time with Bill Maher from 2006 to 2022. His work on the program earned him nine Writers Guild of America Award nominations, including one win, and five Primetime Emmy Award nominations.
