= Aria Giovanni =

American model and erotic glamour actress

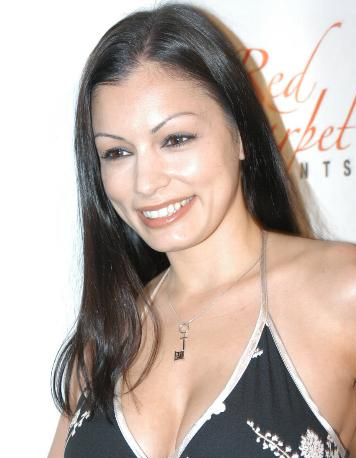
- Giovanni in 2006
- Born: 1977 (age 48–49); Long Beach, California, U.S.
- Occupations: Erotic actress; model

Aria Giovanni (born 1977) is an American former erotic actress and model who was Penthouse magazine's Pet for the month of September 2000. She has modelled in a range of photographic styles including amateur, artistic nude, pinup, fetish, and glamour, and has also had roles in films and television shows.

== Early life ==
Aria Giovanni was born in 1977 in Long Beach, California, the middle of three children. She has an older sister and a younger brother. During an appearance on The Howard Stern Show, Giovanni stated that her father left the family when she was 10 and that she was sent to a drug rehabilitation program at age 12. Giovanni has stated that she was not popular in high school, calling herself an "ugly duckling" who was never asked out on dates. She attended a junior college in San Diego, majoring in biochemistry.

== Career ==
Giovanni was attending a junior college to major in Biology and waitressing five nights a week when she began modeling, having attained 17.5 credits by the semester when she was discovered. She began modeling at the end of 1999, initially to pay for college. About six months into modeling, she was made Penthouse magazine's Pet for the month of September 2000. Her pictorial was shot by Suze Randall. Around this time she was accepted to University of California, San Diego as a junior transfer student with a major in biochemistry and a minor in English writing. However, she decided not to complete college.

In 2001, Giovanni played Monica Snatch in the movie Survivors Exposed, a parody of the Survivor television series. She also appeared on the November 16, 2001, episode of the TV dating show Shipmates. The following year, she starred in Justine, which was recommended by AskMen as one of nine pornographic movies that women can enjoy.

Giovanni was Playboy's Model of the Day for June 6, 2007.

In October 2008, Giovanni appeared in the first episode of James Gunn's short-form web video series, James Gunn's PG Porn, playing a role opposite Nathan Fillion. Giovanni stars on the 2010 Nerdcore Horror Calendar.

In May 2010, Giovanni was included in Complex magazine's list of The 50 Prettiest Porn Stars of All Time.

== Awards and recognition ==
- 2010: XBIZ Award Nominee - Web Babe/Starlet of the Year

== Personal life ==
On The Howard Stern Show, Giovanni stated that she married her boyfriend of five years on her 21st birthday, November 3, 1998. During the same appearance, she stated that she had been living with guitarist John 5 for the past five months and that this was the first time she had dated someone in the entertainment industry. Giovanni and John 5 married in 2005, but later divorced.
