= Zim =

Zim or ZIM may refer to:

== Business ==
- Air Zim, the national airline of Zimbabwe
- Zim dollar, shortened form for the Zimbabwean dollar
- ZIM (shipping company), Israel

== Film and television ==
- Invader Zim, a 2001 animated television series
- Zim and Co., 2005 French film

== Linguistics ==
- Źim, a letter in the Pashto alphabet
- Mesme language (ISO 639-3: zim)

== People ==
=== Given or nickname ===
- Don "Zim" Zimmer (1931–2014), baseball player and manager
- Eugene "Zim" Zimmerman (1862–1935), Swiss–American cartoonist
- Zim Ngqawana (1959–2011), South African musician
- Zim Zum (born 1969), American rock musician

=== Surname ===
- Herbert Zim (1909–1994), naturalist
- Jake Zim, executive at Sony Pictures Entertainment
- Sol Zim (Solomon Zimelman, born 1939). Jewish cantor, US

=== Fictional characters ===
- Zim, character in Invader Zim television series
- Zim, fictional nephew of Yzma in The Emperor's New School
- Charles Zim, a Starship Troopers character

== Places ==
- Žim, Czech Republic
- Zim, Minnesota, United States
- Zim Smith Trail, a recreational trail in Saratoga County, New York
- Zim Zim Falls, a waterfall in Napa County, California
- Zimbabwe, a country in Southern Africa

== Technology ==
- GAZ-12 ZIM, a Soviet limousine
- Zim (software), wiki software
- ZIM (file format), open file format for storing offline website content

== See also ==
- Zima (disambiguation)
