= Hollis Resnik =

American singer and actress (1955–2022)

- Born: June 1, 1955; Euclid, Ohio, U.S.
- Died: April 17, 2022 (aged 66); Chicago, Illinois, U.S.
- Occupations: Singer, actress

Hollis Resnik (June 1, 1955 – April 17, 2022) was an American singer and actress, especially in stage musicals.

== Biography ==
Raised in Euclid, Ohio (a suburb of Cleveland), as a young girl she studied piano and took voice lessons and performed with the Cleveland Symphony Children's Choir. Attending Russell H. Erwine Elementary and Shore Junior High School, she graduated from Euclid High School in 1973.

She graduated from Denison University with a Bachelor of Fine Arts degree.

A Chicago-based theatre actress, Resnik was the 1992 winner of the Sarah Siddons Award. She appeared three times on the television show Cupid, and had supporting roles in the motion pictures Backdraft and Little Big Top, an independent film. In 1993 Resnik appeared in the Off-Broadway musical version of Wings as Amy the "sympathetic therapist".

In 2002, she released a compact disc titled "Make Someone Happy", which has Broadway, pop, jazz and original songs.

She toured in several musicals. She played the role of "Fantine" in the 1st U.S. National Tour of Les Miserables in 1988. She played Mrs. Meers in the U.S. tour of Thoroughly Modern Millie in 2003 and in 2006 was Muriel in the U.S. tour of Dirty Rotten Scoundrels. In March 2007 Resnik toured in the musical Man of La Mancha in the part of Aldonza, also known as Dulcinea.

In the 2001 Ravinia Festival (Illinois) concert version of Sweeney Todd Resnik played the beggar woman. In 2002 she appeared in A Little Night Music in concert at the Ravinia Festival as Countess Charlotte Malcolm. She played the roles of Escalante/Aldonza/Dulcinea in the production of Man of La Mancha at the Court Theatre, Chicago, Illinois, from September 29, 2005, to November 13, 2005.

Resnik starred as the two middle-aged Edies in the Mid-west premiere of Grey Gardens in suburban Chicago's Northlight Theatre, Skokie, Illinois (under the direction of artistic director BJ Jones) from November 12, 2008, through December 21, 2008, in which she was called "splendid" by the talkinbroadway.com reviewer. She played Velma Von Tussle in the musical Hairspray at the Marriott Theatre, Lincolnshire, Illinois in 2009. She played the role of "Old Woman" in the Goodman Theatre's production of Leonard Bernstein's musical Candide in September and October 2010. The chicagonow.com reviewer wrote that "Resnik is hilarious as a half-buttock survivor of her own misfortune. Her 'I Am Easily Assimilated' musical number is easily one of the best songs in the show." She starred as Margaret in the Arena Stage (Washington, D.C.) production of The Light in the Piazza in 2010. The Washington Post reviewer wrote of her performance "Resnik projects soulful vulnerability, a sense that this stifled woman needs as much protection as she seeks to bestow." She played Mother Superior in the touring version of Sister Act.

Resnik played Judy Garland in the 2014 Milwaukee Repertory Theatre production of End of the Rainbow.

Resnik died from heart failure in Chicago on April 17, 2022.
