= Danny Murphy (British actor) =

British actor

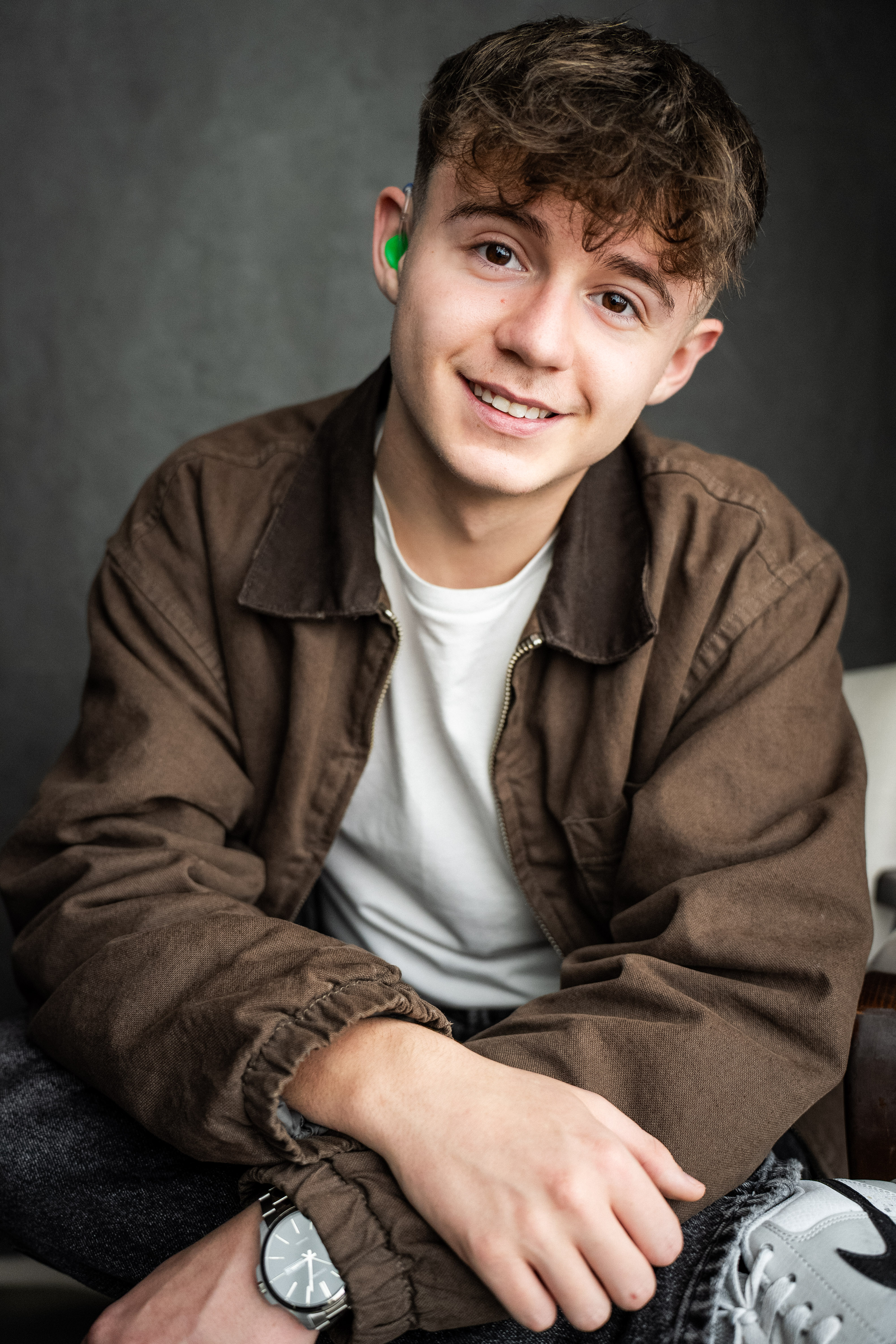
- Murphy in 2025
- Born: 20 February 2004 (age 22); Wallsend, England, United Kingdom
- Occupations: Actor, Director, Writer
- Years active: 2012–present
- Children: 1

Danny Murphy (born 20 February 2004) is a British deaf actor who appeared in the 2019 film The Parts You Lose alongside Aaron Paul. Murphy is fluent in British Sign Language.

== Early and personal life ==
Danny Murphy was born on 20 February 2004. He is fifth-generation deaf on his father's side of the family. Murphy grew up in Wallsend in England with his parents Kelly and Charles and his older brother and younger sister. His parents are deaf, and his siblings are hearing. Murphy's first language is British Sign Language, and spoken English is his second language. Murphy lives in Newcastle but attends Mary Hare School in Newbury, Berkshire as a boarder. As of 2019, he was studying GCSEs in English, Maths, Science, Media, Drama, ICT, Geography and BTEC Business Studies.

== Career ==
By the time Murphy was eight years old, he had acted in a short film featuring skits. He later auditioned to host a CITV programme aimed at deaf and hard of hearing viewers. Murphy also created comedy videos on YouTube and has received 1.5 million views. Murphy was nominated for the Chronicle Champions Awards 2017 in the Young Role Model category, and he won the Diana Award from the British Deaf Association. In March 2020, Murphy took home the Rising Star award from the Royal Television Society for his leading role in the children's series Mission Employable, produced by ITV Signpost in Gateshead.

In 2017, the producers of The Parts You Lose initiated an international casting search, supported by Deaf West Theatre, for a hard of hearing actor and cast Murphy as the film's deaf boy. Murphy learned American Sign Language for the role. The film was released in the United States in October 2019 and in the United Kingdom in March 2020.

In 2019, Murphy went to Germany to host a workshop to teach deaf young people about filming and editing. He also began working on three new films in Europe and the United States. Murphy is currently working as a presenter on CITV's Dare Master, a 10-part series where he takes on crazy dares from extreme window cleaning to bungee jumping. The show is presented in British Sign Language. CITV's Dare Master at Home has been nominated for "Best Lockdown Programme" in the Factual Entertainment, Popular Factual and Kids category. He also appeared on Blue Peter.

In March 2021, Murphy was announced as an ambassador for UK's Young Deaffest.

Murphy has also collaborated with Marvel HQ/Disney on their series, The Untold Tales of the Eternals. This series comprises six animated short episodes incorporating the heroes from Eternals, each of which are offered with sign language overlays in multiple sign languages from around the world. Murphy interprets in BSL for all six episodes. In November, he appeared in the BBC soap opera Doctors as Rory Morgan.

In February 2024, it was announced that Murphy had been cast as Luca Smith in Waterloo Road.
