= Gemini Man (film) =

G-Man

- Theatrical release poster
- Directed by: Ang Lee
- Screenplay by: David Benioff; Billy Ray; Darren Lemke
- Story by: Darren Lemke; David Benioff
- Produced by: Jerry Bruckheimer; David Ellison; Dana Goldberg; Don Granger
- Starring: Will Smith; Mary Elizabeth Winstead; Clive Owen; Benedict Wong
- Cinematography: Dion Beebe
- Edited by: Tim Squyres
- Music by: Lorne Balfe
- Production companies: Skydance; Jerry Bruckheimer Films; Fosun Pictures; Alibaba Pictures
- Distributed by: Paramount Pictures
- Release dates: October 1, 2019 (ZFF); October 11, 2019 (United States)
- Running time: 117 minutes
- Countries: United States; China
- Language: English
- Budget: $138 million
- Box office: $173.5 million

Gemini Man is a 2019 science fiction action thriller film directed by Ang Lee, written by David Benioff, Billy Ray, and Darren Lemke and starring Will Smith in the main dual role, alongside Mary Elizabeth Winstead, Clive Owen and Benedict Wong. The film follows a retiring Force Recon Marine scout sniper who is targeted by a much younger clone of himself while on the run from a corrupt private military company.

Originally conceived in 1997 by screenwriter Darren Lemke, the film spent nearly twenty years in development hell. Several directors, including Tony Scott, Curtis Hanson, and Joe Carnahan, were attached at some point and numerous actors, including Harrison Ford, Mel Gibson and Sean Connery, were set to star. In 2016, Skydance Media purchased the rights to the screenplay (which had been through several rewrites) from Walt Disney Pictures and, in October 2017, Ang Lee signed on to direct for Skydance with Paramount Pictures handling distribution. Filming took place from February through May 2018 using a high frame rate of 120 frames per second.

Gemini Man was released on October 1, 2019, and was theatrically released in the United States by Paramount Pictures on October 11, 2019. The film received generally negative reviews from critics for its plot and screenwriting, although the performances and action sequences were praised. The de-aging of Smith and the high frame rate drew mixed responses. It was also a box-office bomb, grossing only $174 million against its $138 million budget and losing Paramount an estimated $111 million. Nevertheless, the film was nominated for Best Science Fiction Film at the Saturn Awards.

== Plot ==
Henry Brogan, a 51-year-old former Force Recon Marine Scout Sniper working as an operative of the Defense Clandestine Service of the Defense Intelligence Agency, is sent to assassinate a bioterrorist aboard a train in Belgium. Henry's spotter warns him of a young girl approaching the target, causing him to delay his shot until the last second, shooting the man in the neck despite aiming for his head. Disillusioned with killing, Henry retires.

In Buttermilk Sound, Georgia, Henry meets boat rental manager Danny and reconnects with his old friend Jack, who tells Henry that his informant Yuri claims that the target on the train was innocent. Demanding proof, Henry has Jack arrange a meeting with him. In retaliation, agency director Lassiter plans to kill Henry; Clay Verris, director of a rogue private military company codenamed "GEMINI", is denied permission to eliminate him.

Deducing that Danny is a fellow agent sent to monitor him, Henry befriends her. After his home is broken into by government agents, he calls his spotter, who is killed along with Jack and his mistress. Henry warns Danny, and they kill the assassins sent after them, realizing the agency wants them both dead. They escape to Colombia with Baron, Henry's former colleague, hiding at his home and planning to meet with Yuri.

Clay dispatches his top assassin to kill Henry. Fighting him off, Henry realizes the assassin bears an uncanny resemblance to himself as a young man. Arriving at a safe house, the assassin is revealed to be Clay's adopted "son" Junior. Curious about his similarities to Henry, Junior is ordered to finish the job. Danny suggests the assassin might be Henry's child, despite his denials.

Desperate for answers, Henry has Baron obtain a Gulfstream and transport them to Hungary. Testing DNA recovered from Junior, Danny discovers that his and Henry's DNA are identical – Junior is Henry's clone. Henry meets Yuri and learns of GEMINI's cloning project; the man he killed on the train was a scientist who tried to leave the project, having designed a method to produce clones devoid of pain or emotion. Henry calls Lassiter, who agrees to send Junior to bring Danny safely back to the United States.

Collecting Danny, Junior sets up a trap for Henry, who is warned via a covert listening device hidden in Danny's mouth. Ambushing the younger assassin, Henry explains to Junior that he is a clone, revealing their similar traits that no one else could know. Escaping to GEMINI, a heartbroken Junior confronts Clay, who insists he must defeat Henry in order to surpass him. Finding Henry, Junior allies with him to bring down Clay, and Henry urges Junior to quit in order to become someone better.

Baron is killed in an ambush ordered by Clay, with Junior knocking Clay unconscious after a brief hand-to-hand fight. After defeating a wave of GEMINI operatives, Henry, Danny, and Junior face another seemingly unstoppable operative with special body armor that is resistant to bullets, fire, explosions, and blunt trauma. They manage to mortally wound him, and he is discovered to be another youthful clone of Henry, lacking all emotion and ability to feel pain.

Defeated, Clay tries to justify his actions to Junior: clones with Henry's skills would spare the lives of soldiers while making operations incredibly successful. Disgusted, Junior prepares to shoot Clay, but Henry persuades him otherwise and does it himself.

Assured that no more clones were produced and they are finally free, Henry later meets with Junior, who has enrolled in college under the assumed identity of "Jackson Brogan" after Henry's mother's surname. Together, Henry and Danny plan Jackson's future.

== Cast ==
- Will Smith in a dual role as
  - Henry Brogan (codenamed "Henry"): a former Marine Scout Sniper who now works as an operative of Defense Clandestine Service, regarded as the best killer of his generation. Smith was one of many actors considered for the role through the lengthy development process.
  - Jackson Brogan (codenamed "Junior"/"Clone"; raised as Clay Verris Jr.): a cloned assassin of Henry sent after him, and "Senior", another cloned assassin sent after him. Smith was "digitally de-aged" through the use of motion capture and computer generated imagery. Actor Victor Hugo served as the on-set reference for Junior.
- Mary Elizabeth Winstead as Danielle "Danny" Zakarewski: a Navy veteran and DIA OIG agent who helps Henry after the latter saves her from being assassinated. Winstead won the role over Tatiana Maslany.
- Clive Owen as Clayton "Clay" Verris, the ruthless director of GEMINI and former Force Recon Marine and who creates Clone (acting as his adoptive father) to "retire" Henry and Junior take his place.
- Benedict Wong as Baron: a former Marine colleague of Henry's and skilled pilot who works as a tour operator.
- Ralph Brown as Del Patterson: Henry's handler at the DIA.
- Linda Emond as Janet Lassiter, the director of the DIA.
- Douglas Hodge as Jack Willis, a former Marine colleague of Henry's.
- Ilia Volok as Yuri Kovács, a Russian operative who has been secretly monitoring GEMINI's history.

Other cast members include E. J. Bonilla as Marino, a DIA agent killed for his association with Henry; Igor Szász as Dr. Valery Dormov, one of the doctors who cloned Henry; Björn Freiberg as Keller, a GEMINI operative; and Justin James Boykin as Connor.

== Production ==
=== Development and pre-production ===
In 1997, Darren Lemke sold his pitch for Gemini Man after impressing Don Murphy with an unproduced spec script. Warner Bros. Pictures pursued the project, but Walt Disney Pictures ultimately won out and Tony Scott would become attached to direct. Complications soon arose when the studio were planning how to make the film. Harrison Ford and Chris O'Donnell were considered for the lead roles. The producers toyed with the idea of an actor play both roles through the use of visual effects, but Scott moved on from the film before any progress could be made. Mel Gibson briefly boarded the project and shot test footage before departing. At the time, Disney's now-defunct animation/visual effects department The Secret Lab developed a test short, known as Human Face Project, to create visual effects for the film, which would involve creating a younger CG clone of the main actor. Ali screenwriters Stephen J. Rivele & Christopher Wilkinson were hired to polish Lemke's script in July 2000. The following month, Nicolas Cage and Sean Connery were in the running for the dual role. In November 2000, the film was retitled to Gemini and was reportedly slotted for a summer 2002 release with Murphy, Jerry Bruckheimer and Jane Hamsher producing. In April 2001, Jonathan Hensleigh was selected to reconfigure the script while maintaining Lemke's concept. By February 2009, Curtis Hanson entered talks to direct the film while David Benioff had penned the latest draft of the script. Joe Carnahan had previously pitched for the film, and developed test footage with Clint Eastwood as the assassin. The film never progressed at Disney, though, as the technology was not developed enough at that time for the film to be produced. Carnahan also envisioned Jon Voight in the role as well. Later script revisions were done by Billy Ray, Andrew Niccol, and Brian Helgeland.

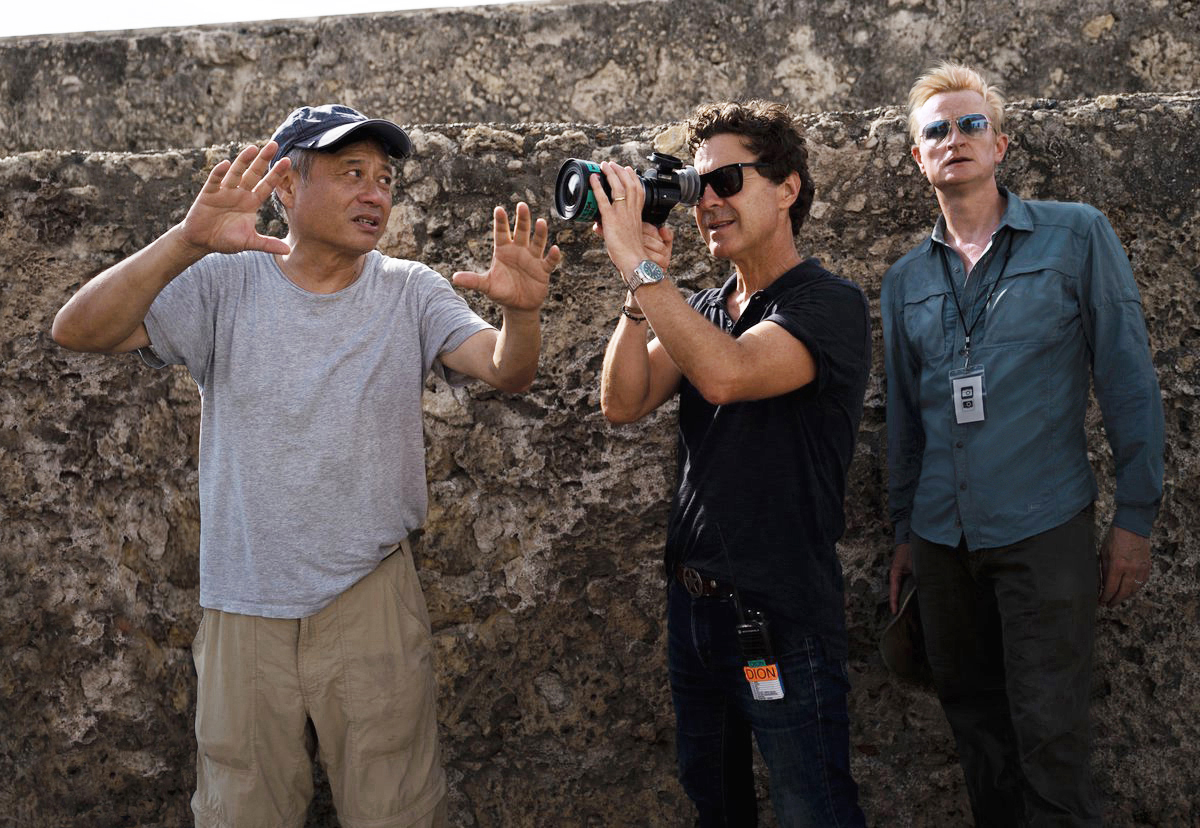
Director Ang Lee, Director of photography Dion Beebe and Production Designer Guy Hendrix Dyas on set in Cartagena, Colombia

In 2016, Skydance Media acquired the film from Disney, with Jerry Bruckheimer producing, along with Skydance's David Ellison, Dana Goldberg and Don Granger. Murphy, Mike Stenson, Chad Oman and Brian Bell would serve as executive producers. Ang Lee was hired to direct the film for Paramount Pictures and Skydance in April 2017 and Fosun Pictures came on board to finance soon after with Guo Guangchang also on board as executive producer.

That same month, Will Smith was cast in the lead role, and a release date set for October 11, 2019. In January 2018, Clive Owen and Mary Elizabeth Winstead were cast in the film, with Winstead winning the role over Tatiana Maslany. In January 2018, Benedict Wong and Ralph Brown joined the cast and filming began in February.

=== Filming ===
Principal production commenced on February 27, 2018, in Glennville, Georgia, and included locations in Cartagena, Colombia. Filming continued in May 2018 at Széchenyi Thermal Bath in Budapest, Hungary. Like Lee's previous film Billy Lynn's Long Halftime Walk, the film was shot digitally at an extra-high frame rate of 120 frames per second (fps), modified for 3D, this time on modified ARRI Alexa cameras mounted on STEREOTEC 3D Rigs.

=== Visual effects ===
The visual effects are provided by Weta Digital and supervised by Bill Westenhofer and Guy Williams, with support from Park Road Post, Universal Production Partners (UPP), Scanline VFX, Legend3D, Inc., The Third Floor, Inc., East Side Effects, Clear Angle Studios and Stereo D.

== Release ==
Gemini Man was released in the United States on October 11, 2019, by Paramount Pictures. It was originally scheduled to be released on October 4, but Paramount pushed the film back for release a week later. It premiered at the Zurich Film Festival on October 1, 2019. It was released in 120 fps HFR (High frame rate) on select screens.

=== Home media ===
Gemini Man was released on 4K Ultra HD Blu-ray, Blu-ray and DVD on January 14, 2020. The 4K Blu-ray used 60 fps presentation in Dolby Vision.

== Reception ==
=== Box office ===
Gemini Man grossed $48.6 million in the United States and Canada, and $124.9 million in other territories, for a worldwide total of $173.5 million. It was estimated the film needed to gross around $275 million worldwide in order to break even; Deadline Hollywood calculated its net loss to be $111.1 million, when factoring together all expenses and revenues.

In the United States and Canada, Gemini Man was released alongside The Addams Family and Jexi, and was originally projected to gross $24–29 million from 3,642 theaters in its opening weekend. The film made $7.5 million on its first day, including $1.6 million from Thursday night previews, lowering weekend estimates to $20 million. It went on to debut to $20.6 million, finishing third at the box office behind The Addams Family and Joker. The low opening was blamed on poor critical response, the familiar premise and the over-performance of Joker. In its second weekend, Gemini Man fell 59.6% to $8.3 million, finishing fifth.

The film opened in five countries the week prior to its U.S. release and made $7 million, finishing first in each market: France ($3 million), Germany ($3 million), Switzerland ($434,000), Austria ($262,000) and Israel ($259,000, Lee's best opener in the country). In China, Gemini Man debuted to $21 million, less than expected, getting upset by fellow new release Maleficent: Mistress of Evil. After two weeks the film had a worldwide total of $118 million, including an "underwhelming" $82 million overseas.

=== Critical response ===
On Rotten Tomatoes, the film holds an approval rating of 27% and an average rating of 4.7/10, based on 329 reviews. The website's critics consensus reads: "Gemini Man's impressive visuals are supported by some strong performances, but this sci-fi thriller is fatally undermined by a frustratingly subpar story." On Metacritic, the film has a weighted average score of 38 out of 100, based on 49 critics, indicating "generally unfavorable" reviews. Audiences polled by CinemaScore gave Gemini Man an average grade of "B+" on an A+ to F scale, while those at PostTrak gave it 3.5 out of 5 stars.

Variety's Peter DeBruge called the film "a high-concept misfire" and wrote: "In practice, it's been a nearly impossible project to get made, passing through the hands of countless actors and falling through multiple times because the technology wasn't there yet. At least, that's been the excuse, although judging by the finished product, it was the script that never lived up to the promise of its premise." Ella Kemp of IndieWire gave Gemini Man a "C+", writing that "For Lee, it seems to make sense – the film welds concerns that have colored a number of his projects: the debate of Nature v Nurture; the alienation of a fraying man; the challenge of what digital filmmaking can do. On paper, Gemini Man tends to all three concerns, but in practice the film is impenetrable beyond its technological clout."

Giving the film one star, Kevin Maher of The Times was unimpressed with the script and the 120 fps shooting, writing "It keeps every detail in the frame (background and foreground) in vivid, garish focus at all times. Besides being aesthetically repellent (it's like 1980s children's telly or the worst wedding video yet)" and called the de-aging "alarmingly unconvincing".

=== Science and influence ===
Gemini Man has been criticized for its unrealistic level of genetic determinism, and its failure to explicitly distinguish between cloning and cloning combined with genetic engineering. The film relies on the conceit that human cloning is inherently menacing, ignoring the fact that a clone would simply be a younger monozygotic ("identical") twin—with the many possible differences that exist between conventionally born identical twins. The film influenced Thalapathy Vijay's science-fiction action film The Greatest of All Time in its development and production with a slightly similar plot and also its de-aging technology was used.

=== Accolades ===
Smith received a nomination for Best Motion Capture/Special Effects Performance at the Austin Film Critics Association Awards 2019. Gemini Man was nominated for Outstanding Visual Effects in a Photoreal Feature and Outstanding Animated Character in a Photoreal Feature at the 18th Visual Effects Society Awards. At the 46th Saturn Awards, the film was nominated for Best Science Fiction Film.

== Bibliography ==
- Singer, Michael (2019). Gemini Man: The Art and Making of the Movie (1st ed.). London: Titan Books. ISBN 9781789092233. OCLC 1101026951.
- Gemini Man: The Official Movie Novelization (1st ed.). London: Titan Books. 2019. ISBN 9781789093018. OCLC 1107446436.
