= Journey 2: The Mysterious Island =

2012 film by Brad Peyton

- Theatrical release poster
- Directed by: Brad Peyton
- Screenplay by: Brian Gunn; Mark Gunn
- Story by: Richard Outten; Brian Gunn; Mark Gunn
- Based on: The Mysterious Island by Jules Verne
- Produced by: Beau Flynn; Tripp Vinson; Charlotte Huggins
- Starring: Dwayne Johnson; Michael Caine; Josh Hutcherson; Vanessa Hudgens; Luis Guzmán; Kristin Davis
- Cinematography: David Tattersall
- Edited by: David Rennie
- Music by: Andrew Lockington
- Production companies: New Line Cinema; Walden Media; Contrafilm
- Distributed by: Warner Bros. Pictures
- Release dates: January 19, 2012 (Australia); February 10, 2012 (United States)
- Running time: 94 minutes
- Country: United States
- Language: English
- Budget: $79 million
- Box office: $335.3 million

Journey 2: The Mysterious Island is a 2012 American science fantasy action-adventure film serving as a standalone sequel to Journey to the Center of the Earth (2008), and based on Jules Verne's novel The Mysterious Island (1875); like its predecessor, Verne's novel exists within the film's universe. Directed by Brad Peyton from a script by Brian and Mark Gunn, it stars Dwayne Johnson, Michael Caine, Josh Hutcherson, Vanessa Hudgens, Luis Guzmán, and Kristin Davis, with Hutcherson reprising his role from the first film. The story follows Sean Anderson who, after receiving a distress call from his long-lost grandfather, mounts a rescue to a mysterious island with help from his militaristic stepfather and the crew of a helicopter tour.

Journey 2: The Mysterious Island was released in theaters on February 10, 2012, by Warner Bros. Pictures. It received mixed reviews, but was a box office success with a worldwide gross of $335 million, surpassing its predecessor.

== Plot ==
Four years after his adventure in the center of the Earth, 17-year-old Sean Anderson is caught by police following a high-speed dirt bike pursuit that ends in a neighbor's swimming pool. His stepfather, Hank Parsons, intervenes to keep him out of juvenile detention.

Sean had broken into a satellite facility to boost a coded signal he believes was sent by his long-missing grandfather, Alexander. Hank helps him decode the message, which leads them to three classic novels—Treasure Island, Gulliver's Travels, and The Mysterious Island—and a set of coordinates pointing to a location in the South Pacific.

Traveling to Palau, they hire helicopter pilot Gabato Laguatan and his daughter Kailani to fly to the coordinates. A cyclone storm crashes them onto the mysterious island, where they encounter miniature elephants, giant butterflies, and other unusual fauna.

They are soon rescued by Alexander, who has been living on the island for years. He reveals they are on the legendary Mysterious Island, which rises and sinks every 70 years. While Alexander believes they have time, Hank finds signs that the island will sink in a matter of days.

To escape, they seek the submarine Nautilus, hidden in an underwater cave at Poseidon's Cliffs. With Kailani's help, they locate Captain Nemo's journal and identify the sub's location. The group travels on giant bees to reach the site but are attacked by bee-eating birds. Sean is injured saving Kailani, and the group briefly rests.

Gabato, enticed by the island's gold, goes missing. While Alexander and Kailani retrieve him from the erupting volcano, Sean and Hank dive to the cave, evading a giant electric eel, and restart Nautilus using the eel's bioelectric charge.

They rescue the others just as the island sinks. Gabato pilots the submarine to safety, while Hank and Sean defend it from volcanic debris. Months later, Gabato operates a successful tourist business aboard Nautilus, and Kailani visits Sean on his birthday. Alexander arrives with From the Earth to the Moon, suggesting it as their next adventure.

== Cast ==
- Dwayne Johnson as Hank Parsons, a former Navy officer who is Sean Anderson's stepfather.
- Josh Hutcherson as Sean Anderson, a 17-year-old adventurer and the nephew of Trevor Anderson
- Michael Caine as Alexander Anderson, Sean's long-lost paternal grandfather.
- Vanessa Hudgens as Kailani Laguatan, Gabato's daughter and Sean's love interest
- Luis Guzmán as Gabato Laguatan, the proprietor of a helicopter tour of low quality in Palau
- Kristin Davis as Liz Anderson-Parsons, Sean's widowed mother and Hank's wife. Jane Wheeler portrayed her in the previous film.
- Anna Colwell as Jessica
- Stephen Caudill as Jim, a police officer and Hank's friend, who informs him about Sean's break-in
- Branscombe Richmond as Tour Guide
- Walter Bankson as Hockey Player

== Production ==
After the commercial success of the first film, New Line Cinema and Walden Media purchased Richard Outten's spec script, Mysterious Travels, in March 2009 to serve as the basis for the film. In the story, the characters embark on a journey to a mysterious uncharted island thought to have inspired the writing of three literary classics: Robert Louis Stevenson's Treasure Island, Jonathan Swift's Gulliver's Travels, and Jules Verne's Mysterious Island. Brian Gunn and Mark Gunn were chosen to revise Outten's script. Warner Bros. Pictures and New Line announced that Journey 2: The Mysterious Island would be released on February 10, 2012.

=== Casting ===
Josh Hutcherson, who plays Sean, is the only actor to reprise his role from Journey to the Center of the Earth. The only other returning character is Sean's mother Liz, with Kristin Davis replacing Jane Wheeler in the role. Dwayne Johnson played Sean's stepfather, who accompanies Sean on the trip to find his missing grandfather Alexander, played by Michael Caine, on a mythical and monstrous island. Vanessa Hudgens was cast as Hutcherson's love interest, Kailani.

== Release ==
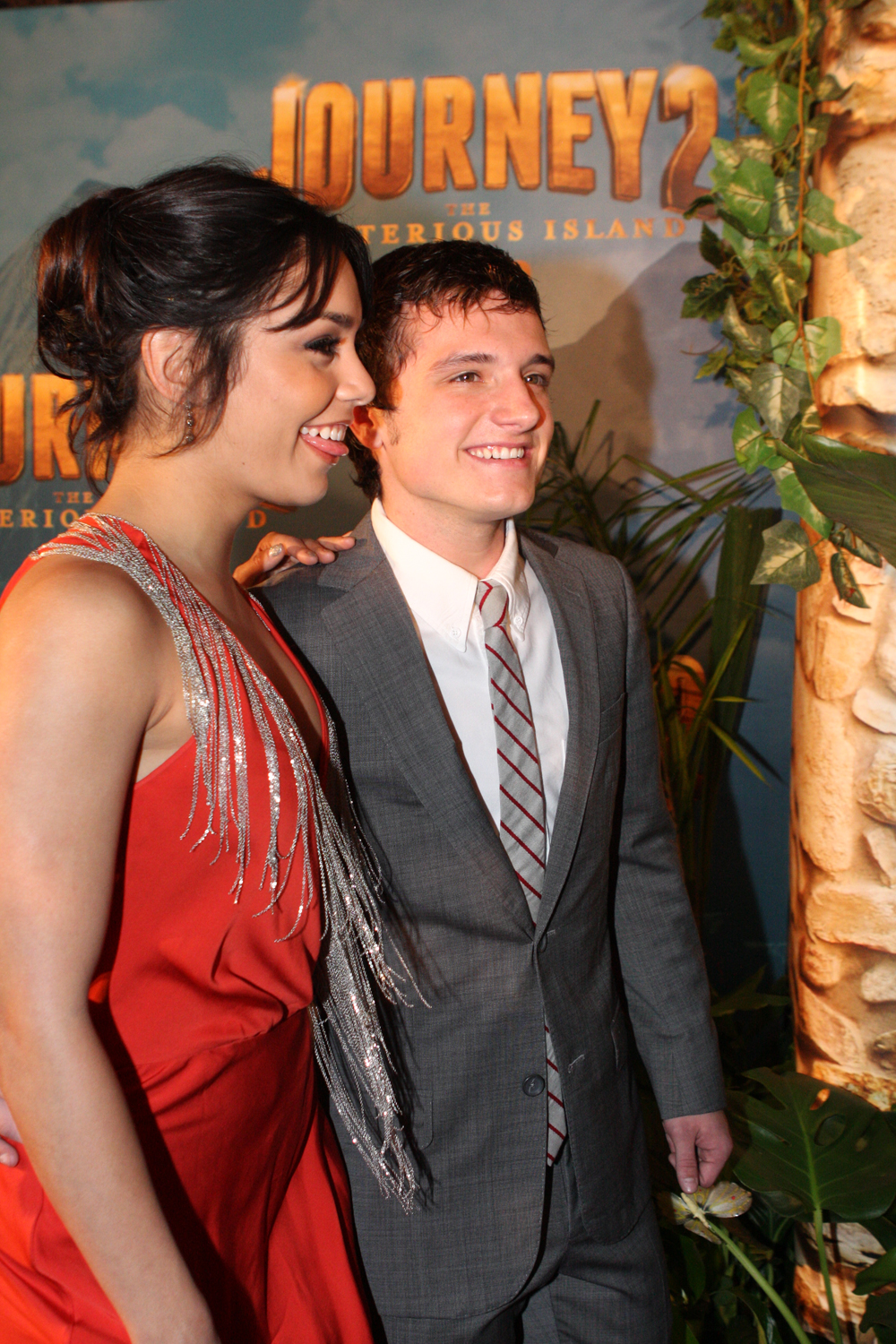
Josh Hutcherson and Vanessa Hudgens in Sydney at the film's premiere on January 17, 2012

=== Theatrical release ===
Journey 2: The Mysterious Island was released theatrically on February 10, 2012, by Warner Bros. Pictures. The film was accompanied by a 3D Looney Tunes short titled Daffy's Rhapsody.

=== Home media ===
Journey 2: The Mysterious Island was released on DVD/Blu-ray on June 5, 2012.

== Reception ==
=== Box office ===
Journey 2: The Mysterious Island grossed $103.9 million in North America and $231.4 million in other territories, for a worldwide total of $335.3 million, against a production budget of $79 million surpassing its predecessor. In North America, the film earned a $6.54 million on its debut Friday, ranking fourth at the box office. Over the weekend, it earned $27.3 million, coming in third place, much higher than the original's $21.0 million debut. Outside North America, Journey 2 began its run three weeks before its North American release. It topped the box office outside North America for two consecutive weekends and three in total. It surpassed the original's total outside North America. Its highest-grossing region after North America was China ($58.4 million), followed by Russia and the CIS ($17.6 million) and Mexico ($12.7 million).

=== Critical response ===
On review aggregator Rotten Tomatoes, the film holds an approval rating of 44% based on 129 reviews. The site's critics consensus reads: "Aggressively unambitious, Journey 2 might thrill tween viewers, but most others will find it too intense for young audiences and too cartoonishly dull for adults." On Metacritic, the film has a weighted average score of 41 out of 100 based on 27 critics, indicating "mixed or average". Audiences polled by CinemaScore gave the film an average grade of "A−" on an A+ to F scale.

Lisa Schwarzbaum of Entertainment Weekly gave the film a B grade, stating that "the movie flies by pleasantly, and is then instantly forgettable. Perhaps Jules Verne can explain the science of that". Randy Cordova from the Arizona Republic said: "Johnson can't save the movie, directed by Brad Peyton, from being a sloppy skip from one seemingly unrelated idea to the next". Roger Ebert, who gave the first film two stars, gave the sequel two-and-a-half stars, stating: "It isn't a 'good' movie in the usual sense (or most senses), but it is jolly and goodnatured, and Michael Caine and Dwayne Johnson are among the most likable of actors".

=== Accolades ===
List of awards and nominations
Award	Year	Category	Recipient	Result
BMI Film & TV Awards	2012	Film Music	Andrew Lockington	Won
Golden Trailer Awards	2012	Best Animated Family Poster	Warner Bros and Ignition Creative	Nominated
Teen Choice Awards	2012	Choice Movie Actress: Sci-Fi/Fantasy	Vanessa Hudgens	Nominated
Teen Choice Awards	2012	Choice Movie Actor: Sci-Fi/Fantasy	Josh Hutcherson	Won
Movie Guide Awards	2013	Best Family Film		Nominated
Nickelodeon Kids' Choice Awards	2013	Favorite Male Butt Kicker	Dwayne Johnson	Won
Nickelodeon Kids' Choice Awards	2013	Favorite Movie Actress	Vanessa Hudgens	Nominated

== Soundtrack ==
- Letterbomb - Performed by Green Day
- Sleep Forever - Performed by Crocodiles
- Aloha Oe - Performed by Dwayne Johnson
- Hello Again - Performed by Meta & The Cornerstones
- Three Little Birds - Performed by Bob Marley & The Wailers
- What a Wonderful World - Performed by Dwayne Johnson

== Future ==
In August 2014, Carey Hayes and Chad Hayes were announced to write the script for a third film. Brad Peyton and Dwayne Johnson were expected to direct and star in the sequel, respectively. It was later stated that there would be two sequels. By January 2018 however, Johnson stated despite the financial success of The Mysterious Island, and although a third film titled Journey 3: from the Earth to the Moon (based on the 1865 novel) was intended, its development had been cancelled due to a lack of immediate interest and troubles in adequately adapting the novel. Despite this, reports from Hollywood production insiders arose in August 2020, stating that a sequel was once again in development. In December 2021, Hiram Garcia confirmed that Warner Bros. Pictures wanted a sequel film, though Seven Bucks Productions decided to delay development in favor of pursuing other projects.

== See also ==
- List of underwater science fiction works
