= Lost (2004 film) =

- DVD cover
- Directed by: Darren Lemke
- Written by: Darren Lemke
- Produced by: Paul Emami; Kevin Matossian
- Starring: Dean Cain; Ashley Scott; Griffin Armstorff; Irina Björklund; Justin Henry; Danny Trejo
- Cinematography: Paul Emami
- Edited by: Bob Joyce
- Music by: Russ Landau
- Distributed by: SilverCrest Entertainment
- Release date: October 5, 2004
- Running time: 90 minutes
- Country: United States
- Languages: English; Spanish

Lost is a 2004 American thriller film starring Dean Cain. It was written and directed by first-time filmmaker Darren Lemke.

== Plot ==
After orchestrating a robbery, bank Vice President Jeremy Stanton (Dean Cain) gets lost driving in the desert, en route to meeting his family with a deadline of eight hours. He listens to tapes by a lifestyle guru (the film is divided into sections titled according to chapters from the guru's best-selling book) and seeks help from a telephone route-finding service, which gives him guidance that does not agree with his map. At first it seems as if he has succeeded in the perfect crime, but things quickly deteriorate – he is pursued by one of his fellow robbers (Danny Trejo), a ruthless killer whom he double crossed; his wife begins to doubt the choices they've made; he attempts to turn himself in to a state trooper, who is found dead by his pursuer's hand – and self-doubt plagues him. The film is almost a solo performance, with few other characters except Stanton and Judy (Ashley Scott), the woman from the telephone route-finder service, and tension builds in a Kafka-esque style as it becomes clear that things are not what they seem. Ultimately, it is revealed that Judy has been paid by his pursuers to lead him into a trap. He is surrounded and one of his pursuers taps on the window as the movie ends.

== Cast ==
- Dean Cain as Jeremy Stanton
- Irina Björklund as Cora Stanton
- Danny Trejo as Edward James Archer
- Justin Henry as Chester Gould
- Ashley Scott as Judy
- Bill Cobbs as Jeremy's Boss
- Robert Easton as Minister

== Reception ==
Kevin Thomas of the Los Angeles Times said in his review; "Lost is consistently clever, amusing – and scary."

Jon Strickland of LA Weekly called the film a "likable thriller (that) shows surprising smarts for a low-budget debut".
