= Drunkboat =

- Directed by: Bob Meyer
- Starring: Dana Delany; John Malkovich; John Goodman
- Release date: October 8, 2010 (Chicago)
- Running time: 98 minutes
- Country: United States
- Language: English

Drunkboat is a 2010 American drama-genre film starring John Malkovich, Dana Delany and John Goodman. The film premiered at the 2010 Chicago International Film Festival.

== Cast ==
- Dana Delany as Eileen
- John Malkovich as Mort
- John Goodman as Mr. Fletcher
- Jacob Zachar as Abe

== Reception ==
The film has a 23% rating on Rotten Tomatoes. John Semley of Slant Magazine awarded the film one star out of four.
