= Darren Lemke =

American screenwriter

- Born: 1969 or 1970 (age 56–57)
- Education: School of Visual Arts
- Occupation: Screenwriter
- Years active: 1997–present

Darren Lemke (born 1969 or 1970) is an American screenwriter who has been active in the film industry since the late 1990s. With his work on the films Shrek Forever After (2010), Turbo (2013), Goosebumps (2015), Goosebumps 2: Haunted Halloween (2018), Shazam! (2019), and Kung Fu Panda 4 (2024), The Hollywood Reporter called Lemke "a known player in the family feature space".

== Background ==
Lemke was born in 1969 or 1970. Raised in Carlstadt, New Jersey, he went to Paramus Catholic High School in Paramus, New Jersey. After high school, he attended the School of Visual Arts in Manhattan, New York to study screenwriting. In 1997, he sold two pitches to Touchstone Pictures for Tony Scott to direct; one of the pitches became Gemini Man, which was released in 2019. In 2004, Lemke wrote and directed the thriller film Lost. In the following year, Lemke pitched the idea of adapting the English fairy tale "Jack and the Beanstalk" with computer-generated imagery. By 2013, Jack the Giant Slayer was directed by Bryan Singer.

Lemke's first major screenwriting credit was for the 2010 film Shrek Forever After, which he wrote with Josh Klausner. Since then, he wrote and helped write for mostly family-oriented feature films. He also became one of the executive producers for the TV series The Wheel of Time (2021–2025).

In 2024, Disney hired Lemke to write a script for a detective film set in Disneyland's private dining club Club 33. In the same year, Lemke worked on a draft of a script for Shout It Out Loud, a biopic in development about the band Kiss with McG attached to direct.

== Credits ==
Lemke's credits
Year	Title	Medium	Notes
2004	Lost	Film	Wrote, also directed
2010	Shrek Forever After	Film	Writing credit with Josh Klausner
2013	Jack the Giant Slayer	Film	Story credit with David Dobkin; screenplay credit with Christopher McQuarrie and Dan Studney
2013	Turbo	Film	Screenplay credit with Robert D. Siegel and David Soren; story credit for Soren
2015	Goosebumps	Film	Screenplay credit; story credits for Scott Alexander and Larry Karaszewski
2018	Goosebumps 2: Haunted Halloween	Film	Story credit with Rob Lieber; screenplay credit for Lieber
2019	The Parts You Lose	Film	Writing credit
2019	Shazam!	Film	Story credit with Henry Gayden; screenplay credit for Gayden
2019	Gemini Man	Film	Story credit with David Benioff; screenplay credit with Benioff and Billy Ray (Note: Despite Lemke's credits, he was not involved with the film directed by Ang Lee.)
2021–2025	The Wheel of Time	Television	Executive producer; 24 episodes (three seasons)
2024	Kung Fu Panda 4	Film	Writing credit with Jonathan Aibel and Glenn Berger
