= John Cabrera =

American actor (born 1975)

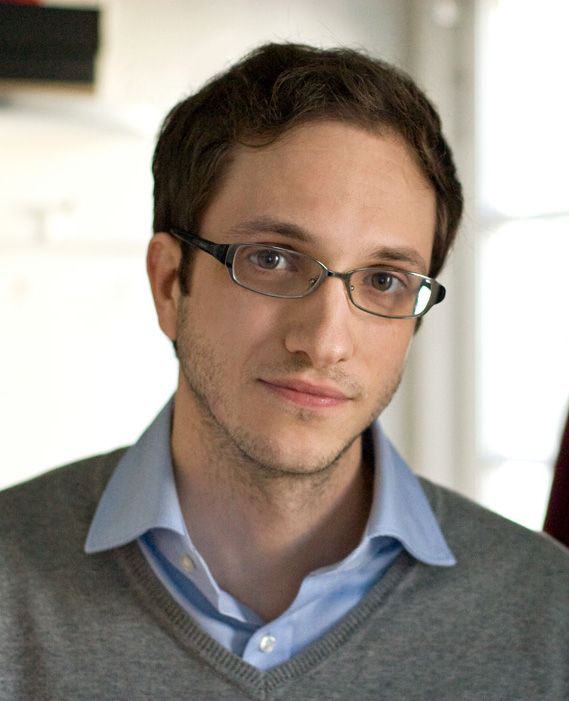
- Born: John Peter Cabrera; August 26, 1975 (age 50); Miami, Florida, U.S.
- Education: DePaul University (BFA)

John Cabrera (born August 26, 1975) is an American actor, screenwriter and director best known for his role as Brian Fuller on the television show Gilmore Girls on The WB (later The CW). He has also appeared on Studio 60 on the Sunset Strip, NCIS, American Dreams, Miracles, and CSI.

== Early life ==
John was born in Miami, Florida and attended Miami Killian High School (class of 1993) where he first began his training as an actor. He later attended DePaul University's The Theatre School (formerly The Goodman School of Drama) in Chicago, Illinois where he received a BFA in Acting. Other acting colleagues from the school include longtime friends Judy Greer, Michael Muhney, and Sean Gunn.

In 1998 he joined a collective of theatre professionals and helped found Collaboraction, a multi-disciplinary theatre ensemble best known for its mixed media theatre festival Sketchbook which he co-created with Collaboraction artistic director Anthony Moseley. In 2001 Cabrera received an Joseph Jefferson Citation Award for his role as Nat in Collaboraction's stage production of Refuge (by Jessica Goldberg).

== Career ==
John moved to Los Angeles in 2000, where he began working as an actor in the fields of Television, Film, and Theater. He has worked at such theaters as Mark Taper Forum's Taper Too, and South Coast Repertory.

Although he was first known as an actor, John is also a director of films, including the short film Affair Game by Jessica Goldberg (stars Hamish Linklater, Irina Bjorklund, and Liza Weil) and the featurette The Man Who Invented the Moon written by longtime colleague and friend Lee Kirk and starring Sean Gunn. In 2007, John directed Jenna Fischer (NBC's The Office) in a music video for singer songwriter Willie Wisely's single, "Through Any Window".

=== Writing ===
In recent years, however, John has increasingly focused his career as a screenwriter. In 2010, John wrote and directed the indie musical series The Homes for Lockerz. It stars Chelsea Kane and Gilmore Girls costars Sean Gunn and Keiko Agena, among others. The Homes is the story of a group of teenagers on a wild road trip across the United States. Each episode ends with a music video featuring songs written and recorded for the series and performed by young actors themselves.

In 2008, it was announced that John had partnered with Cosimo De Tommaso to write and produce a Warner Premiere web series entitled H+ (now called H+ The Digital Series). In a 2009 interview, John calls it a Sci-fi story that explores our relationship to technology and how it defines us.
