= Little Big Top =

- Theatrical poster
- Directed by: Ward Roberts
- Written by: Ward Roberts
- Produced by: Christina Mauro; Jessica Petelle-Slagle
- Starring: Sid Haig; Richard Riehle; Hollis Resnik; Mel England; Jacob Zachar
- Cinematography: Jim Timperman
- Edited by: Jonathan Del Gatto
- Music by: Don Smith, Thomas Gustin
- Production company: Fly High Films
- Distributed by: Moving Pictures Film and Television (U.S. theatrical); Morningstar Entertainment (DVD)
- Release date: October 21, 2006 (Heartland Film Festival)
- Running time: 89 minutes
- Country: United States
- Language: English
- Budget: $240,000 (estimated)
- Box office: $7,072 (United States)

Little Big Top is 2006 American comedy film written and directed by Ward Roberts and starring Sid Haig, Richard Riehle, Hollis Resnik, Mel England, and Jacob Zachar. The film tells the story of an aging, unemployed clown who returns to his small hometown, content to spend the rest of his days in a drunken stupor. But his passion for clowning is reawakened by the local amateur circus.

The film went into production in July 2005 and was filmed in Peru, Indiana, which was once the winter headquarters for several famous circuses, including Ringling Brothers, Barnum and Bailey, and Wallace. Annually during the third weekend of July, the Peru Amateur Circus holds performances for the whole week, ending with a Circus City Festival and Parade. Little Big Top premiered on October 21, 2006, at the 8th Heartland Film Festival held in Indianapolis. It was released on DVD in November 2008 by Morningstar Entertainment.

== Reception ==
Joe Leydon of Variety wrote that the film was "a lightly likable trifle that benefits greatly from the offbeat casting of vet heavy Sid Haig" and even though it "predictably evolves into a seriocomic tale of personal redemption through clowning around", "Haig maintains just enough irascibility to keep things interesting".
