= Brian Gunn =

American actor, producer, and screenwriter

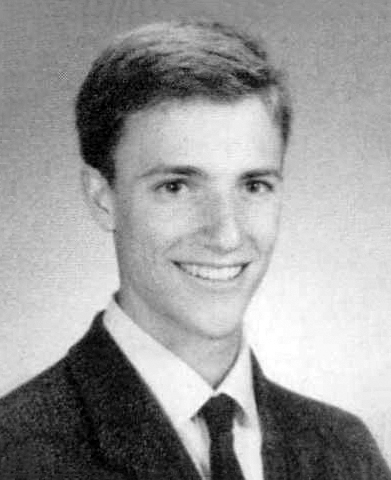
- Gunn in 1988
- Born: Brian Donald Gunn; August 23, 1970 (age 56); Paradise, Nevada, U.S.
- Education: College of the Holy Cross
- Occupations: Actor; producer; screenwriter
- Years active: 2000–present
- Relatives: James Gunn (brother); Matt Gunn (brother); Sean Gunn (brother); Patrick Gunn (brother); Mark Gunn (cousin)

Brian Donald Gunn (born August 23, 1970) is an American actor, producer, and screenwriter. He was raised in St. Louis, Missouri.

== Early life and background ==
Gunn has four brothers: filmmaker James Gunn, actor and political writer Matt Gunn, actor Sean Gunn, and producer Patrick Gunn, a former executive vice president of Artisan Entertainment. He also has a sister, Beth. Their parents are Leota and James F. Gunn, a lawyer.

Gunn attended Saint Louis University High School, where he graduated in 1988. He subsequently attended the College of the Holy Cross in Worcester, Massachusetts, graduating in 1992.

== Career ==
Gunn has worked as a screenwriter, producer, and actor. His film credits include 2gether (2000), Bring It On Again (2004), Journey 2: The Mysterious Island (2012), and Brightburn (2019). He has also worked on several television productions, including 2gether: The Series and PG Porn.

== Filmography ==
=== Film ===
| Year | Title | Role | Notes |
|---|---|---|---|
| 2000 | 2gether | Soundtrack, executive producer, and writer | Television film |
| 2000 | The Specials | Eight | |
| 2003 | The Man Who Invented the Moon | Co-executive producer | Short film |
| 2004 | Bring It On Again | Screenwriter | |
| 2004 | Gayosity | Writer | Short film |
| 2012 | Journey 2: The Mysterious Island | Screenwriter | |
| 2019 | Brightburn | Screenwriter | |

=== Television ===
| Year | Title | Role | Notes |
|---|---|---|---|
| 2000 | 2gether: The Series | Executive producer, writer, and creator | |
| 2005 | Daisy Does America | Creative consultant | |
| 2008 | Humanzee! | Consulting producer | Episode: "Pilot" |
| 2008–2009 | PG Porn | Creator, writer, crew member, and actor | Played Guy |
| 2009 | The Jace Hall Show | Himself | Episode: "James Gunn & Brutal Legend" |
