= The Hive (2014 film) =

- Theatrical release poster
- Directed by: David Yarovesky
- Written by: Will Honley; David Yarovesky
- Produced by: Cary Granat; Jared Mass; Ed Jones; Vincent Sieber
- Starring: Gabriel Basso; Kathryn Prescott; Gabrielle Walsh; Jacob Zachar; Sonya Eddy; Stephen Blackehart
- Cinematography: Michael Dallatorre
- Edited by: Jeff Hall; Christopher E. Garcia
- Music by: Anthony B. Willis
- Production companies: Legendary Digital Media; Midnight Road Entertainment; Witness Protection Films
- Distributed by: Nerdist Industries
- Release dates: September 19, 2014 (Fantastic Fest); September 14, 2015 (United States)
- Running time: 93 minutes
- Country: United States
- Language: English

The Hive is a 2014 American science fiction horror film co-written and directed by David Yarovesky (in his directorial debut). The film was released in a limited release on September 14, 2015, by Nerdist Industries.

== Plot ==
Infected with an unknown virus that mutated his body, Adam Goldstein wakes in a barricaded cabin with no immediate recollection of who he is or what has happened. Through a series of flashbacks, messages he wrote to himself, and clues such as sketches and photographs, Adam gradually pieces together past events.

In the 1980s, Russian scientist Dr. Yuri Yegorov experimented on restrained subjects in an attempt to connect their brains to a hive mind. The experiments succeed, but patients mutate, break free from their restraints, and kill researchers in the lab. More recent flashbacks show Dr. Baker performing brain surgery on a little girl named Kayla who recites a complex mathematical equation before dying during the operation. Based on what he saw with Kayla, Dr. Baker seeks funding for research into shared memories. A mysterious man in a suit sets up Dr. Baker in a lab with Dr. Yegorov's research as a starting point. Yegorov eventually comes to warn Baker that their research is dangerous and potentially evil. When Baker refuses to back down, Yegorov holds Baker at gunpoint while his men steal the hive virus samples. Yegorov's team escapes on a hijacked plane.

Adam remembers being a counselor at Camp Yellow Jacket with his friend Clark. Even though Adam has a history of sleeping around with women at the camp, including a secret affair with Clark's friend Jess, Adam falls for a counselor named Katie and the two of them gradually foster a romance.

Yegorov's plane crashes in a nearby forest. Adam, Clark, Katie, and Jess investigate the crash site only to be attacked by the infected. They drive away, but Clark crashes their vehicle. Everyone makes it back to camp on foot, but the pilot vomits a black substance that infects Jess.

Adam and Katie leave Clark with Jess in the infirmary while they go to radio for help. Adam then leaves Katie alone in a vehicle while he goes on ahead to discover all the camp kids infected. Through hive mind voices, Jess reveals to Clark her affair with Adam. Clark exits the infirmary to hunt down Adam but Clark finds Katie and ends up infecting her.

Infected Katie returns to the infirmary and tells Adam he should escape. Jess attacks Adam and he is forced to kill her to save himself. Adam locks Katie in a separate room to protect her but she infects him with the black substance before he locks the door. Adam leaves messages and clues for himself to explain the situation for the time when the infection inevitably possesses him. He then succumbs to the virus and collapses. Adam preemptively uses his affection for Katie as a thought trigger to revive himself. He allows Clark into the cabin but is taunted by the hive mind voices and he proceeds to beat Clark to death.

Although successfully disconnected from the hive mind, Adam realizes he can still tap into virtually anyone's memory. Adam frees Katie from the other room and tries to disconnect her from the hive. Katie remains possessed and Adam is forced to kill her. He then uses a soldier's memory and a defibrillator to restart Katie's heart. Katie returns to life with regained control over her own sentience.

Adam and Katie flee the cabin, battle several people possessed by the hive, and eventually escape in a vehicle. However, Adam's narration intimates that the world was overrun by the infection and he planted false memories about their escape in Katie's mind to protect her from the truth.

== Cast ==
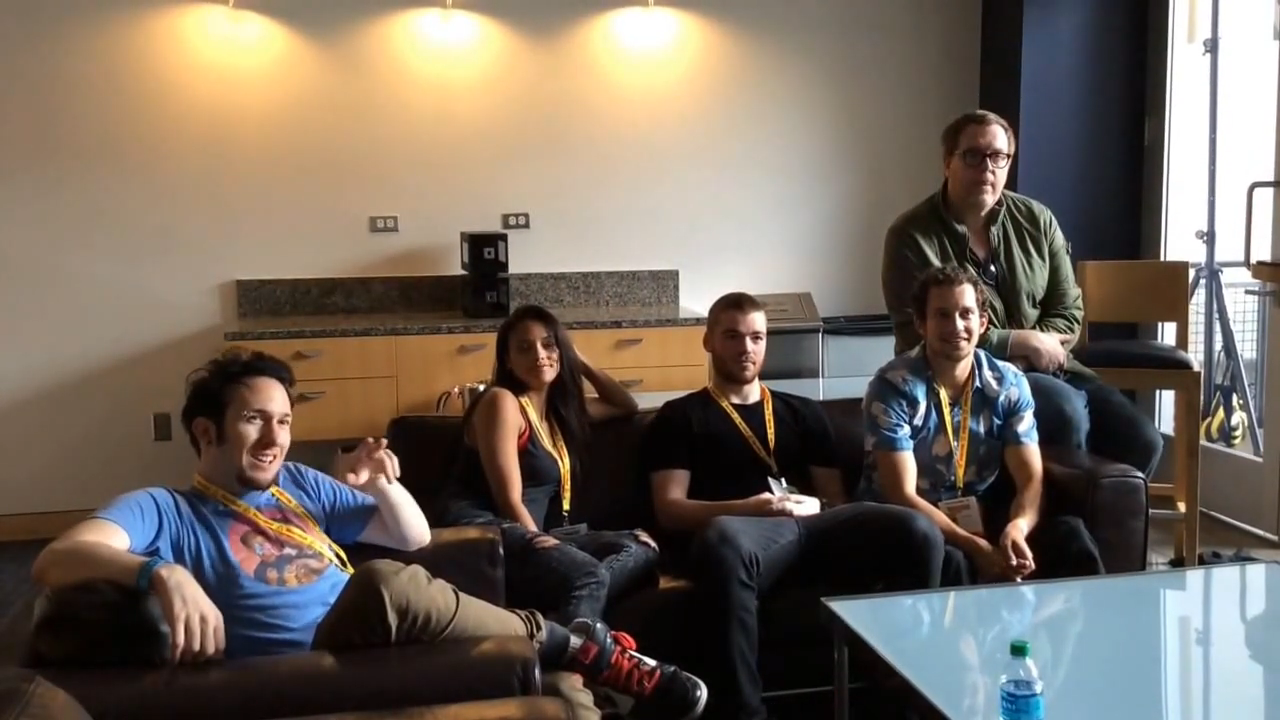
The film cast, from left to right: David Yarovesky, Gabrielle Walsh, Gabriel Basso, Jacob Zachar and Steve Agee

- Gabriel Basso as Adam Goldstein
- Kathryn Prescott as Katie
- Gabrielle Walsh as Jess
- Jacob Zachar as Clark
- Sean Gunn as Dr. Baker
- Elya Baskin as Dr. Yuri Yegorov
- Elaine Kagan as Subject 14
- Sonya Eddy as Nurse Tessa
- Todd Christian Hunter as Pilot
- Peter Mackenzie as Man in Suit
- Ivo Nandi as Alexsandr
- Sonya Krimsky as Mrs. Baker
- Talitha Bateman as Kayla
- Steve Agee as Kevin
- Aurelia Scheppers as Megan / Current Girl #1
- Madelaine Petsch as Current Girl #2
- Velinda Godfrey as Current Girl #3
- Alexandra Grossi as Current Girl #4
- Stephen Blackehart as Soldier #1
- Mike Escamilla as Soldier #2
- Angie Menze as Shower Girl

== Release ==
The film had its world premiere on September 19, 2014, at Fantastic Fest in Austin, Texas. It was presented at San Diego Comic-Con in July 2015, and was subsequently released to theaters and digital platforms by Nerdist Industries in Fall 2015. The film was released in a limited release on September 14, 2015, for one-night-only partnership with Fathom Events.
