= The H Collective =

Entertainment industry company

- Company type: Private
- Industry: Film
- Founded: June 2017; 8 years ago
- Founder: Kenneth Huang
- Headquarters: Los Angeles, California, United States
- Website: www.thehcollectivefilms.com

The H Collective is an American film finance, production, marketing and distribution company founded in 2017. The company was founded by Chinese financier Kenneth Huang and has Chinese and American backers. THC is headquartered in Los Angeles, and it has offices in Shanghai and Berlin. THC's "first global title" was the 2019 film Brightburn, for which it was developing a sequel in 2023. THC acquired the rights to the XXX film series from Revolution Studios in 2018 to produce a fourth film, but faced a lawsuit from Weying Galaxy in 2020 over alleged misrepresentation and unauthorized transactions concerning those rights.

In 2019, THC formed a partnership with Japanese technology conglomerate Rakuten, although it ended by 2023. THC expanded its operations to Saudi Arabia, focusing on film development and production in the Arabic-speaking market. THC also ventured into integrating Metaverse, Web3, and AI technologies into film production through its new subsidiary, H3 Entertainment.

A 2024 investigation by Deadline Hollywood revealed that Kenneth Huang left the company with numerous lawsuits, substantial debts, and unresolved disputes, leading to his disappearance.

== Company history ==
Prior to 2017, Chinese financier Kenneth Huang was Paramount Pictures's connection to Chinese resources. In June 2017, he created The H Collective, which was launched during the 2017 Shanghai International Film Festival with the goal of financing and/or producing four films a year in its first four years. For THC, Huang hired "experienced and trusted" Hollywood executives to make films. The company was financially backed by Huang and his brother Kent Huang as well as other Chinese and American backers.

In the following September, the company hired as CEO Nic Crawley, who was the president of international marketing and distribution for Paramount Pictures. The company subsequently hired Jenna Sanz-Agero as EVP Business Affairs and Operations and Ivy Sun as CFO.

In April 2018, THC partnered with Sony Pictures to market and distribute THC's films. In the same month, Sherryl Clark was hired as THC's President of Production. Sanz-Agero was promoted to Chief Operating Officer, and Sun was promoted to Chief Strategy Officer. Del Mayberry replaced Sun as the CFO. In the following May, THC partnered with the online video platform company iQiyi to co-produce three films.

In May 2019, Japanese technology conglomerate Rakuten took a stake in THC's upcoming films, also establishing a joint venture with the studio to distribute films in Japan. By the following August, THC partnered with Rakuten to establish Rakuten H Collective Studio, a joint venture for film production in Japan, and Rakuten Distribution, which will primarily release films produced by THC. By September 2023, THC ended its partnership with Rakuten. (A journalistic investigation in 2024 revealed that Rakuten successfully sued THC and Kenneth Huang for $52 million for engaging in a Ponzi scheme with their partnership.)

In 2020, THC opened in Berlin an office that would focus on film development and production, with Mark Rau as Europe CEO. In January 2022, THC signed a co-production deal with Inqisam Studios, a Saudi Arabian sub-company of Nowaar Entertainment, to co-invest and produce films and TV shows with a focus on the Arabic-speaking market but aimed at global audiences. In the past year, multiple executives left THC's Los Angeles office, which was being overseen by Kent Huang.

In September 2023, THC launched H3 Entertainment, a new company focused on integrating Metaverse, Web3, and AI technologies into film production. H3 Entertainment is based in Dubai and Hong Kong, with seed investors from London, Singapore, and Hong Kong.

In 2024, Deadline Hollywood conducted a six-month investigation and reported, "THC was a legitimate operation and Huang appeared to be the real deal. Until he was not. As quickly as THC blossomed into life, the company rotted from its sapling roots and Huang vanished from view... he left behind a litany of lawsuits; colleagues and investors owed tens of millions of dollars; a messy and unresolved dispute over the xXx franchise; mortgage defaults on a palatial Bel Air house; more than $160,000 in unpaid office rent; and scripts from writers, including John Wick scribe Derek Kolstad, with no clean chain of title."

== Project history ==
The H Collective's first projects in 2017 were distributing and marketing in the Americas the films Hanson and the Beast, Wolf Warrior 2, and A Better Tomorrow 2018. THC also started in June 2017 backing six projects including The Parts You Lose (ultimately released in 2019) and a fourth installment of the XXX film series (not yet produced). In April 2018, THC acquired the rights to the XXX film series from Revolution Studios. In October 2020, Weying Galaxy filed a lawsuit against THC alleging fraudulent misrepresentation in the XXX deal, claiming it was misled into contributing over $6 million towards acquiring derivative rights. Weying sought punitive damages and control over a joint venture, following discoveries that contradicted initial claims about the acquisition of rights, leading to financial and operational setbacks.

In 2018, THC financed and produced the film Brightburn with Troll Court Entertainment, the company of James Gunn, one of the film's producers. With a release in 2019, Deadline Hollywood called Brightburn THC's "first global title".

The first film that was planned under THC's 2019 partnership with Rakuten is Beast, based on a Black List script by Aaron W. Sala, which was acquired in March 2018 by THC in a mid-six figure deal. Morena Baccarin was cast in the starring role, and Espen Sandberg was hired to direct the film. Pre-production was planned in New Zealand in late March 2020, but due to concerns of the COVID-19 pandemic there, the preparation was halted. There have been no subsequent updates or announcements regarding the film's resumption.

THC said in September 2023 that it was developing a sequel to Brightburn. In the following April, a producer of the first film, James Gunn, said a sequel was unlikely due to issues with rights.

== Filmography ==
Films with The H Collective's involvement
Year	Film	Notes	Ref.
2017	Hanson and the Beast	North and South American distribution rights	
2017	Wolf Warrior 2	North and South American distribution rights	
2018	A Better Tomorrow 2018	North and South American distribution rights	
2019	The Parts You Lose	Produced by The H Collective and Gran Via Productions, distributed by Samuel Goldwyn Films	
2019	Brightburn	Produced by The H Collective, distributed by Screen Gems	
2021	Wrong Turn	Produced by The H Collective and Constantin Film, distributed by Saban Films	

Projects in development by The H Collective include The Vineyard, Beast, The Remainders, and Shadow Song.
