= Sean Gunn =

American actor (born 1974)

- Gunn at the 2026 Rose City Comic Con
- Born: May 22, 1974 (age 52); St. Louis, Missouri, U.S.
- Education: DePaul University (BFA)
- Occupation: Actor
- Years active: 1995–present
- Spouse: Natasha Halevi (m. 2019)
- Relatives: James Gunn (brother); Matt Gunn (brother); Brian Gunn (brother); Mark Gunn (paternal cousin)

Sean Gunn (born May 22, 1974) is an American actor. He is known for his roles as Kirk Gleason on The WB series Gilmore Girls (2000–2007), and Kraglin Obfonteri in the Marvel Cinematic Universe. In this role, he has been in the films Guardians of the Galaxy (2014), Guardians of the Galaxy Vol. 2 (2017), Avengers: Endgame (2019), Thor: Love and Thunder (2022), Guardians of the Galaxy Vol. 3 (2023), as well as the animated series What If...? (2021–2024), and television special The Guardians of the Galaxy Holiday Special (2022). He also played Weasel and Calendar Man in the Warner Bros./DCEU film The Suicide Squad (2021). He reprised the role of Weasel in the DCU HBO Max series Creature Commandos (2024), where he also plays G.I. Robot. He is the younger brother of director James Gunn and often appears in his productions.

== Early life and education ==
Sean Gunn was born on May 22, 1974 in St. Louis, Missouri, the youngest of six children. He is the brother of filmmaker James Gunn, actor and political writer Matt Gunn, screenwriter Brian Gunn, producer and former vice president of Artisan Entertainment Patrick, and a sister, Beth, who works as an employment attorney. His parents are Leota (née Hynek) and James F. Gunn, a retired partner and corporate attorney with the law firm Thompson Coburn in St. Louis.

Gunn and his brothers attended the Jesuits' St. Louis University High School, where he graduated in 1992. He graduated from The Theatre School at DePaul University in 1996.

== Career ==
In 1995, Gunn played Sammy Capulet in the B movie Tromeo and Juliet. In 2000, he guest starred in the second episode of Gilmore Girls as Mick, a DSL cable installer. As the first season continued, he was brought back in the recurring role of Kirk Gleason, one of Stars Hollow's most eccentric citizens. He was a regular cast member from 2002 to the series' end in 2007. He also had a recurring role on October Road as Rooster.

Although he is best known for his Gilmore Girls role, he also has several television guest appearance credits, including Angel; 3rd Rock from the Sun; Yes, Dear; True Jackson, VP; Andy Richter Controls the Universe; and Bunheads. He can also be seen in commercials as an "agent" for the text message information service KGB.com. In films, he has also had several roles, the most substantial being "Alien Orphan/Doug" in The Specials, for which he also received a co-producer credit.

In 2003, Gunn starred in the featurette The Man Who Invented the Moon, directed by fellow Goodman School of Drama alum and Gilmore Girls cast member John Cabrera. Gunn and Cabrera have been close artistic colleagues since their school days in Chicago in the mid-nineties.

Along with his brothers James and Brian, he is a creator and actor in the spoof-porn series James Gunn's PG Porn. He also had a brief role as a computer maintenance man on the Nickelodeon show True Jackson VP. He starred in a series of television commercials for Knowledge Generation Bureau, and appeared in the 2010 film Super, written and directed by his brother James.

He is also the voice actor behind the character of Swan in the Warner Brothers video game Lollipop Chainsaw, also written by his brother James.

Gunn guest-starred in the season 4 episode "Makeover" of Glee as committee member Phineas Hayes.

In 2014, he provided performance capture for the character of Rocket, and played the role of Kraglin, Yondu Udonta's second-in-command, in Guardians of the Galaxy.

In 2014, he held a supporting role in Bones on Fox in the episode "The Corpse at the Convention". In 2017, he reprised his role as Kraglin in Guardians of the Galaxy Vol. 2, playing a larger part, and again provided performance capture for the character of Rocket.

In 2018 he provided Rocket's motion capture in Avengers: Infinity War and in its sequel the next year.

In 2021 he played the role of Weasel as well as Calendar Man in The Suicide Squad.

Gunn reprised his role as Kraglin in 2022's Thor: Love and Thunder, The Guardians of the Galaxy Holiday Special and 2023's Guardians of the Galaxy Vol. 3.

In 2024, he reprised his role as Weasel in Creature Commandos, where also voiced G.I. Robot.

In 2025, Gunn appears as Maxwell Lord in Superman. He reprised the role that year in the second season premiere of Peacemaker.

== Personal life ==
Gunn married actress and film director Natasha Halevi in 2019.

== Filmography ==
=== Film ===
Key
†	Denotes works that have not yet been released

Year	Title	Role	Notes	Ref.
1996	Tromeo and Juliet	Sammy Capulet		
1997	Stricken	Guffy		
1999	The Auteur Theory	Tori York		
2000	The Specials	Alien Orphan	Also producer	
2001	Love, Sex & Murder	The Waiter	Short film Also associate producer	
2001	Pearl Harbor	Traction Sailor		
2003	The Man Who Invented the Moon	Sammy Hughes	Short film Also executive producer	
2004	Fish Out of Water	Jim	Short film	
2005	Jesus, Mary and Joey	Stevie		
2008	Pants on Fire	PK		
2010	Super	Toby		
2012	The Giant Mechanical Man	George		
2013	Who the F Is Buddy Applebaum	Pinto		
2014	Guardians of the Galaxy	Kraglin Obfonteri	Also motion-capture performance for Rocket and Thanos	
2015	The Hive	Dr. Baker		
2016	The Belko Experiment	Marty Espenscheid		
2016	Ordinary World	Ted		
2016	A Boy Called Po	Ben		
2017	Guardians of the Galaxy Vol. 2	Kraglin Obfonteri	Also motion-capture performance for Rocket	
2018	Avengers: Infinity War	—N/a	Motion-capture performance for Rocket	
2019	Avengers: Endgame	Kraglin Obfonteri	Cameo; also motion-capture performance for Rocket	
2021	The Suicide Squad	Weasel, Calendar Man		
2021	Agnes	Paul Satchimo		
2022	Thor: Love and Thunder	Kraglin Obfonteri	Also motion-capture performance for Rocket	
2023	Guardians of the Galaxy Vol. 3	Kraglin Obfonteri, voice of young Rocket	Also motion-capture performance for Rocket	
2025	Superman	Maxwell Lord		
2025	Nimrods	Colby		
2025	Appofeniacs	Clinto Binto		
TBA	Cotton Eye Joe †	TBA	Filming	

=== Television ===
Year	Title	Role	Notes	Ref.
1999	Any Day Now	Clerk	Episode: "A Parent's Job"	
1999–2000	Angel	Lucas, Mars	2 episodes	
2000	Brutally Normal	Lenny	2 episodes	
2000	The Michael Richards Show	Dennis	Episode: "Simplification"	
2000–2007	Gilmore Girls	Kirk Gleason, Mick	137 episodes Series regular	
2001	Inside Schwartz	Focus Group Guy #2	Episode: "Bless Me Father, for I Have Fired You"	
2001	DAG	Ryan	Episode: "Prom"	
2001	3rd Rock from the Sun	Attendant	Episode: "You Don't Know Dick"	
2001	Going to California	Joey "Fuzz" Fucetti	4 episodes	
2002	Yes, Dear	David Scott	Episode: "Making Baby"	
2002–2003	Andy Richter Controls the Universe	Phil	3 episodes	
2004	Gilmore Girls Backstage Special	Himself	Television film	
2007–2008	October Road	Vincent "Rooster" Road	6 episodes	
2008	Scream Queens	Himself	1 episode	
2008	Sparky & Mikaela	Dude	Episode: "Pilot"	
2008	Humanzee!	Humanzee	Episode: "Pilot"	
2008–2009	James Gunn's PG Porn	Peppermint Patty, Jason, Bill Scrotey	8 episodes Also co-creator and writer	
2009	True Jackson, VP	Justin	Episode: "ReTRUEnion"	
2009	The Jace Hall Show	Himself	Episode: "James Gunn & Brutal Legend"	
2011	For a Green Card	Andrew	Episode: "What Could Possibly Go Wrong?"	
2012	Antiques Roadshow	Himself	Episode: "Junk in the Trunk 2"	
2012	Glee	Phineas Hayes	Episode: "Makeover"	
2012–2013	H+	Jason O'Brien	9 episodes	
2012–2013	Bunheads	Sebastian	2 episodes	
2013	The Education of Eddie and Mortimer	Creepy Carl	Television film	
2014	The Victoria Uyen Show	Himself	Episode: "Guardians of the Galaxy Premiere"	
2014	Bones	Dr. Howard Fitch	Episode: "The Corpse at the Convention"	
2016	Superstore	Card Shopper	Episode: "Secret Shopper"	
2016	Gilmore Girls: A Year in the Life	Kirk Gleason	Miniseries	
2018	Robot Chicken	Various Voices	Episode: "Why Is It Wet?"	
2021	What If...?	Kraglin Obfonteri	Voice, episode: "What If... T'Challa Became a Star-Lord?"	
2021	The Rookie	Treasure Hunter	Episode: "Poetic Justice"	
2022	The Terminal List	Saul Agnon	1 episode	
2022	The Guardians of the Galaxy Holiday Special	Kraglin Obfonteri	Also motion-capture performance for Rocket	
2023	The Good Doctor	Kenny	Episode: "Love's Labor"	
2023	The Marvelous Mrs. Maisel	Stewart Jones	Episode: "The Testi-Roastia"	
2023	Marvel Studios: Assembled	Himself	Episode: "The Making of Guardians of the Galaxy Vol. 3 "	
2024–present	Creature Commandos	Weasel, G.I. Robot	Voice	
2025	Celebrity Jeopardy!	Himself (Contestant)		
2025	Peacemaker	Maxwell Lord	Episode: "The Ties That Grind"	

=== Video games ===
Year	Title	Role
2012	Lollipop Chainsaw	Swan

== Sources ==
- "Gunns Hit Their Target in Hollywood" by Mary Delach Leonard. St Louis Post-Dispatch. March 23, 2003. p. E1
