= Jake Zim =

American businessman

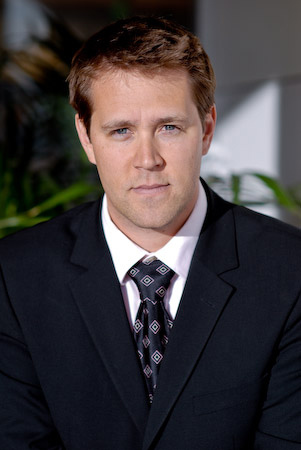
- Zim in 2008
- Occupation: CMO Of Another Axiom

Jake Zim is the Former Senior Vice President of Virtual Reality for Sony Pictures Entertainment. Zim oversaw global virtual reality production and strategy for the motion picture group and he has produced a wide variety of interactive projects across the spectrum of distribution channels including location-based, mobile and in-home. Zim has been instrumental in the development of virtual reality experiences such as the Emmy® nominated Spider-Man: Homecoming VR, Ghostbusters: Dimensions, The Emoji Movie VR Experience, Can You Walk The Walk and Jumanji: The VR Adventure, and Hotel Transylvania Popstic VR. The L.A. Times called Zim's appointment "the first VR czar at a major studio." Jake Zim joined Sony Pictures Entertainment Worldwide Marketing and Distribution as Senior Vice President of Digital Marketing in 2011 until leaving in 2024. Before joining Sony, he was vice president, Digital Marketing at Twentieth Century Fox.

== Education ==
Jake Zim graduated with a B.A. in history from the University of California at Berkeley where he was also a member of the 1998 MCLA National Championship Lacrosse Team. He received his MBA from the University of Southern California's Marshall School.

== Career ==
Early in his career he was an actor, appearing in shows such as MTV's Undressed.

=== Lionsgate ===
In 2005 Zim was hired as Director of Digital Media Marketing at Lionsgate, the leading independent film studio. Zim directed the digital campaigns for such titles as the Academy Award winning Crash and box office successes such as Saw II, Hostel and Madea's Family Reunion.

=== Fox Atomic ===
From 2006 to 2008 Jake ran the digital team at Fox Atomic. As Vice President of Online Marketing he developed digital theatrical marketing campaigns for 28 Weeks Later, The Comebacks, Turistas and The Hills Have Eyes 2. During that time he joined the Fox team that partnered with NBC to launch Hulu.

=== Safran Digital Group ===
In 2008 Zim served as Chief Operating Officer of Safran Digital Group (SDG), a digital media entertainment company that finances, develops and distributes entertainment programming and technologies for digital platforms. Safran Digital Group, headed by Peter Safran, the veteran Hollywood producer and talent manager, was hired by Microsoft to produce original content for the Xbox 360. At Safran Digital Group (SDG) Jake Zim executive produced programming such as Xbox's first-ever original series Horror Meets Comedy and Spike.com's "PGP".

=== Twentieth Century Fox ===
Prior to joining Sony, Zim was vice president, Digital Marketing at Twentieth Century Fox. He led the digital marketing strategy for Avatar, including the record-breaking launch of the trailer on Apple Trailers, which received over 4 million streams in 24 hours. He also led the strategies for X-Men Origins: Wolverine, Night at the Museum: Battle of the Smithsonian, Ice Age 3: Dawn of the Dinosaurs, Alvin and the Chipmunks: The Squeakquel, Date Night, The A-Team, Predators, Wall Street: Money Never Sleeps, Unstoppable, The Chronicles of Narnia: The Voyage of the Dawn Treader, and, Rio.

=== Sony Pictures Entertainment ===
Jake Zim joined Sony Pictures Entertainment Worldwide Marketing and Distribution as Senior Vice President of Digital Marketing in 2011. Projects undertaken during his tenure in this position include Angry Birds (film), The Walk, Chappie, No Good Deed, The Monuments Men, Captain Phillips, RoboCop, Skyfall, Men in Black 3, Moneyball, 21 Jump Street and 22 Jump Street Zim and his team received a 2014 Webby Award for Telekinetic Coffee Shop Surprise.

Zim partnered with hyper-reality pioneers The Void and Madame Tussauds New York to create a virtual reality experience called Ghostbusters: Dimension. The experience was engineered by The Void in collaboration with the film's director Paul Feig and Ghostbusters creator Ivan Reitman. Past VR experiences from Sony include theatrical promotions for "Goosebumps" and "The Walk" (with PlayStation VR), both of which were adapted as mobile VR experiences ahead of their respective home entertainment releases. In 2015, Zim partnered with D-Box to debut the Goosebumps Virtual Reality Adventure. Jake Zim left Sony in September of 2024

=== Another Axiom ===
Jake Zim Joined Another Axiom in September of 2024 as the CMO and Head of Monke Business. He oversees all marketing, brand, licensing and IP extensions for Another Axiom games, including the world's biggest VR game, Gorilla Tag and their newest release, Orion Drift.

== Digital Marketing Campaign History ==
- Spectre (2015)
- Hotel Transylvania 2 (2015)
- Goosebumps (2015)
- The Walk (2015)
- The Amazing Spider-Man 2 (2014)
- 22 Jump Street (2014)
- The Equalizer (2014)
- American Hustle (2013)
- Captain Phillips (2013)
- This is the End (2013)
- Evil Dead (2013)
- Men In Black 3 (2012)
- Hotel Transylvania (2012)
- 21 Jump Street (2012)
- The Vow (2012)
- James Bond (2012)
- The Amazing Spiderman (2012)
- Moneyball (2011)
- Rio (2011)
- The Girl with the Dragon Tattoo (2011)
- A-Team (2010)
- Predators (2010)
- Wall Street: Money Never Sleeps (2010)
- Diary of a Wimpy Kid (2010)
- Knight and Day (2010)
- Love & Other Drugs (2010)
- Vampires Suck (2010)
- Date Night (2010)
- Unstoppable (2010)
- Machete (2010)
- Alvin and the Chipmunks: The Squeakquel (2009)
- Ice Age 3: Dawn of the Dinosaurs (2009)
- X-Men Origins: Wolverine (2009)
- Night at the Museum: (2009)
- Avatar (2009)
- Madea's Family Reunion (2006)
- Saw II (2005)
- Hostel (2005)
- Grizzly Man (2005)
- Crash (2004)
