= Gabrielle Walsh =

American actress (born 1989)

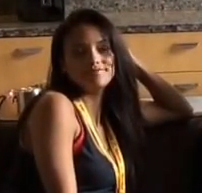
- Walsh in 2015
- Born: May 10, 1989 (age 37); Chicago, Illinois, U.S.
- Occupation: Actress
- Years active: 2011–present
- Children: 1

Gabrielle Walsh is an American actress. She is best known for her roles as Marisol in the found footage supernatural horror film Paranormal Activity: The Marked Ones (2014), and as Jess in the science fiction thriller The Hive (2014). Walsh portrays Lacey Quinn in the NBC drama series Found and has appeared on various other television series, most notably Shameless, The Vampire Diaries, From Dusk till Dawn: The Series, and Close Enough.

== Early life and education ==
She is originally from Indian Head Park, Illinois and graduated from Lyons Township High School in 2007. She is of African American and Irish descent. She has a daughter.

== Filmography ==
=== Film ===
Year	Title	Role	Notes
2011	Kleptosomnia	Jenny	Short film
2014	Paranormal Activity: The Marked Ones	Marisol Vargas	
2014	The Hive	Jess	
2017	Roofers	Melissa	
2021	Unknown Dimension: The Story of Paranormal Activity	Herself	Documentary film

=== Television ===
Year	Title	Role	Notes
2014	The Vampire Diaries	Monique	Recurring role (season 6); 6 episodes
2015–2016	Shameless	Tanya	Recurring role (season 5–7); 5 episodes
2015	Agent X	Angelica Tulum	Episode: "Sacrifice"
2016	Making Moves	Lucy	Main role; 9 episodes
2016	East Los High	Sofia	Recurring role; 6 episodes
2016	From Dusk till Dawn: The Series	Manola Jimenez	Episode: "La Reina"
2017	Small Shots	Amy	3 episodes
2017	The Brave	Sofia	Episode: "The Greater Good"
2019	The Flash	Raya Van Zandt / Silver Ghost	Episode: "The Flash & the Furious"
2020	NCIS	Michelle Stamos	Episode: "Everything Starts Somewhere"
2020–2021	9-1-1	Ana Flores	Recurring role (seasons 3–5); 10 episodes
2020–2022	Close Enough	Emily Ramirez/Herself	Main voice role
2021	FBI: Most Wanted	Eva Martin	Episode: "Anonymous"
2021	Lucifer	Betty	Episode: "Family Dinner"
2023–2025	Found	Lacey Quinn	Main role
