= Jacob Zachar =

American actor (born 1986)

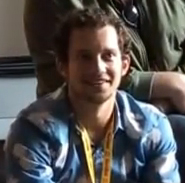
- Zachar in 2015
- Born: May 16, 1986 (age 40); Chicago, Illinois, U.S.
- Occupation: Actor
- Years active: 2006–present
- Spouse: Brittany Saberhagen (m. 2019)
- Children: 2

Jacob Zachar (born May 16, 1986) is an American actor best known for playing Russell "Rusty" Cartwright on the ABC Family TV Series Greek.

== Early years and education ==
Zachar was born in Chicago, Illinois (his Greek character, Rusty Cartwright, is also from Chicago). He attended St. Francis Borgia grammar school. He also attended St. Patrick High School, an all-boys Catholic school in Chicago.

== Career ==
Zachar booked his first starring role in Greek after living in Los Angeles for only two months. He played the part of Ernest in the film Little Big Top and then appeared as a cashier in the movie Bodega, also in 2006. He has also done commercials for Carl's Jr. and Dunkin' Donuts. He has performed in various theater roles such as On Golden Pond, Prairie Lights, Big: The Musical, Les Misérables and Guys and Dolls.

Zachar provided voices for the movie Surf's Up and an episode of the animated television series King of the Hill where he was a cashier. In 2005, Zachar completed the film Drunkboat in which he stars along with Dana Delany, John Malkovich and John Goodman.

== Personal life ==
While living in Chicago, he was in a metal band called Megaband. Zachar also sang in a punk/ska group Not Too Good. He now plays in a blues and funk band part-time.

On May 25, 2019, Zachar married set costumer Brittany Saberhagen after five years of dating.

== Filmography ==
Year	Title	Role	Notes
2006	Little Big Top	Ernest	
2006	Bodega	Cashier	Short film
2007	Surf's Up		Additional Voices
2007–2011	Greek	Rusty Cartwright	Main Cast
2010	Drunkboat	Abe	
2011	Marcy	Jacob	Episode: Marcy Does a Pool Party
2012	Detention of the Dead	Eddie	
2012	House	Guest Star	"Holding On"
2013	CSI: Crime Scene Investigation	Chad	Episode: "Dead Air"
2013	Project S.E.R.A.	Adam	Webseries
2014	Those Who Wander	Sam	
2014	The Hive	Clark	
2018	Shrimp	Angelina's husband	Short film
2020	Arkansas	Stranger	
