= Mark Gunn (screenwriter) =

American screenwriter and producer

- Education: College of the Holy Cross (BA)
- Occupation: Screenwriter

Mark Gunn is an American screenwriter and producer based in Pasadena, California who wrote the screenplays for the films Journey 2: The Mysterious Island and Brightburn.

== Early life and education ==
Mark Gunn was born in St. Louis, Missouri. He is the cousin of screenwriter James Gunn, actor and political writer Matt Gunn, former Senior Vice President of Artisan Entertainment Patrick Gunn, actor Sean Gunn, and writer Brian Gunn.

He graduated from St. Louis University High School, then graduated from the College of the Holy Cross in Worcester, Massachusetts, with a bachelor's degree.

== Career ==
Gunn's first job was writing the MTV movie 2gether. He is also known for Journey 2: The Mysterious Island (2012), Bring It On Again (2004) and 2gether (2000). He was elected to the Writers Guild of America West Board of Directors in 2006.

== Filmography ==
Year	Title	Role	Notes
1998	Thursday Afternoon	Production Assistant	Short
2000	2gether	Soundtrack/Executive Producer/Writer	TV movie
2002	2gether: The Series	Creator/Executive Producer/Writer/Director	TV series
2004	Bring It On Again	Screenwriter	
2005	Daisy Does America	Creative consultant	TV series
2012	Journey 2: The Mysterious Island	Screenwriter	
2019	Brightburn	Screenwriter/Executive Producer	
