= Zima (surname) =

Zima (Czech and Slovak feminine: Zimová) is a Slavic surname meaning winter. It may refer to

- Alfred Zima (born 1931), Austrian Olympic boxer
- David Zima (born 2000), Czech footballer
- Lukáš Zima (born 1994), Czech footballer
- Madeline Zima (born 1985), American actress
- Tomáš Zima (born 1966), Czech scientist
- Vanessa Zima (born 1986), American actress
- Vera Zima (1953–2020), Croatian actress
- Yvonne Zima (born 1989), American actress
