= The Man Who Invented the Moon =

2003 film

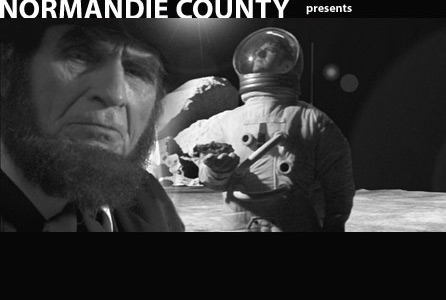
- The Man Who Invented the Moon
- Directed by: Joe Colburn
- Written by: Lee Kirk
- Produced by: Larry Fitzgibbon
- Starring: Sean Gunn; Nicolette DiMaggio; Julie Dolan; Brent Sexton
- Cinematography: Ken Seng
- Edited by: John Cabrera
- Music by: Willie Wisely
- Distributed by: Normandie County Films
- Release date: 2003
- Running time: 32 mins
- Country: United States
- Language: English

The Man Who Invented the Moon is a 2003 film by Normandie County Films written by Lee Kirk and directed by Laura Hegarty and John Colburn. The film stars Matt Gunn, Nicolette DiMaggio, Julie Dolan, and Brent Sexton and was produced by Larry Fitzgibbon. The Man Who Invented the Moon was John Cabrera's directorial debut.

== Cast ==
- Joe Colburn as Sammy Hughes
- Nicolette Dimaggio as Haley/Megan
- Julie Dolan as Haley 2
- Brent Sexton as Tommy
- Charles Brame as Abe Lincoln
- Matt Gunn as Dan McMahon
- Dave Barnes as Santa Claus
- Eddie Ebell as Jesus Christ
- Robert Gantzos as Davy Crocket
- Michael Cornacchia as Babe Ruth
- Michael Garvey as Super Amazing
- Cathi Stinson as Neighbor

== Festival Showings ==
- The Midwest Independent Film Festival
- Saint Louis International Film Festival
- Los Angeles International Short Film Festival
