= Kenneth Huang =

Chinese businessman

Huang Jianhua
- 黄健华
- Born: Jian-hua Huang; September 12, 1964 (age 61); Guangzhou, Guangdong, China
- Occupation: Businessman
- Years active: 1988–2024
- Awards: 2009 BQ Philanthropist of the Year

Huang Jianhua, also known as Kenneth Huang (Chinese: 黄健华; born 1964), is a Chinese retired businessman. Huang founded Sportscorp China in 2004 and QSL Sports in 2008. In 2009, Huang began investing in Chinese sports leagues and teams. After 2010, Huang began to invest in movies. Huang is currently a board member of the Shanghai Film Group and Jiaflix Enterprises. Huang is cited as the managing director for Rocket Capital, an investment group with ties to the former Houston Rockets owner Leslie Alexander. Huang served as one of the directors of the Aspen Infrastructure Investment Corporation owned by the billionaire George Lindemann. Huang is also reportedly the owner of the Chinese sports conglomerate Sina Sports.

Huang is credited as being a founder of Jiaflix, China Movie Media Group, Huahua Media, and the H Collective.

Huang manages and owns the National Basketball League and the China Baseball League through his company QSL sports. He is also the current owner of the Chinese Basketball Association team the Jilin Northeast Tigers.

In 2012, Oriental Morning Post did an investigation of assets connected to Huang, leading to Huang's net worth being evaluated at US$1.05 billion.

== Early life and education ==
Born in Guangzhou, Guangdong, Huang's parents had close business and government ties. He was influenced highly by his grandparents, former professional badminton players who had played for China and Indonesia and he entered a state-run badminton school at the age of 9. Huang placed 6th in China for junior badminton but instead of becoming a professional, he attended Sun Yat-sen University where he studied Japanese and became the number one college badminton player. Huang then came to the United States in 1985 where he earned a master's degree from St. John's University while also taking classes at Columbia University and New York University.

== Career ==
=== Wall Street ===
In 1988, Huang became the first mainland educated Chinese person to work on Wall Street, as a public relations executive.

=== Chinese Sports ===
Huang and Chicago-based sports consultant Marc Ganis, founded Sportscorp China in 2004, a company that helps bridge sports and sponsorship deals between the United States and China. This enabled Chinese sponsorship and rights distribution deals with both the Houston Rockets and the New York Yankees.

Huang founded QSL Sports in 2008 alongside Adrian Cheng, whose family controls the Hong Kong conglomerate New World Development, investing in Chinese sports leagues and team.

Huang introduced the Cleveland Cavaliers in 2009 to Tsingtao Brewery, which resulted in an agreement between the two. It was reported in early 2010 that Huang had acquired a 15% shareholding in the Cleveland Cavaliers, considered at the time the first significant investment in a large US sports franchise by Chinese investors. However, in April 2010 it was made clear by the Cavaliers that Huang's role with the Cavaliers was to have acted as a middleman to secure the team's sponsorship with Tsingtao. Adrien Cheng left his partnership with Huang soon after for unspecified reasons. Adrien's departure as co-chair of both the National Basketball League of China and the China Baseball League, left Huang as the sole chair of both.

Huang also bought the Jilin Northeast Tigers.

=== Liverpool deal and article ===
During an interview in April 2010 with the UK's The Mirror newspaper, Huang claimed to be at a "crucial stage" in negotiations to acquire the Liverpool F.C. team for £500 million. Four months later, Huang instead offered to pay off Liverpool's US$374 million in debts it owed to the Royal Bank of Scotland in return for control of the team. At the time, Huang claimed that the massive Chinese sovereign wealth fund, China Investment Corporation, could become a silent investor in the deal. China Investment Corp, however, soon after denied this, saying it had "never heard of a plan to buy Liverpool or of Kenneth Huang". Huang eventually dropped out of the deal a few weeks later. A source close to the matter reported that the China Investment Corporation was involved but pulled out of the deal once their involvement was publicised.

=== Inter Milan ===
On 1 August 2012, Inter Milan announced that, club owner Massimo Moratti agreed to sell a minority interests of the club to a Chinese consortium led by Kenneth Huang. On the same day Inter announced an agreement was formed with China Railway Construction Corporation Limited for a new stadium project. The deal would lead to Kenneth Huang, Kamchi Li, and Fabrizio Rindi being placed onto the board in October of that year. In 2013, Inter Milan would negotiate for a further sale of stake to the Chinese consortium, however financial difficulty and stalled negotiations would lead to the eventual withdrawal of Chinese investment in the club.

The club was taken over by International Sports Capital, a company co-owned by Erick Thohir in 2013, with Moratti, Pirelli and many small investors as the minority shareholders.

=== The H Collective ===
After creating The H Collective in 2017, an investigation by Deadline Hollywood revealed that Huang left the company by 2024 with numerous lawsuits, substantial debts, and unresolved disputes, leading to his disappearance.
