= 2gether (2gether album) =

Studio album by 2gether
- Released: February 15, 2000
- Genre: Pop
- Length: 37:11
- Label: TVT
- Producer: Veit Renn; Brian Kierulf; Josh Schwartz; Anthony Vanderburgh; Ted Perlman; Ken Hirsch; Anthony Anderson; Steve Smith; Camara Kambon; Marc Nelson

2gether chronology
2gether (2000)	2gether: Again (2000)

Professional ratings
Review scores
Source	Rating
AllMusic	3/5 stars

2gether is the debut album by 2gether, released in 2000. It includes the singles, "U + Me = Us (Calculus)", "Say It (Don't Spray It)", and "Before We Say Goodbye". It also contains "2Gether", which later became the theme song for the band's TV show. The name is a Wordplay of the word together and also 2 get her. Most of the lyrics were written by the band's creators, Brian Gunn and Mark Gunn.

== Track listing ==
All songs performed by 2gether, except where noted.

No.	Title	Writer(s)	Producer(s)	Length
1.	"2gether"	Veit Renn; Nigel Dick	Renn	3:56
2.	"U + Me = Us (Calculus)"	Brian Gunn; Mark Gunn; Josh Schwartz; Brian Kierulf	KNS Productions	3:19
3.	"Rub One Out" (performed by Whoa!)	B. Gunn; M. Gunn; Dick; Julie Glaze; Schwartz; Kierulf; Andrew Fromm	KNS Productions	2:50
4.	"Say It (Don't Spray It)"	B. Gunn; M. Gunn; Anthony Vanderburgh	Vanderburgh	3:20
5.	"Before We Say Goodbye"	Ken Hirsch	Hirsch	4:04
6.	"Visualize" (performed by Q.T.)	Michael Cuccione; Russell Marsland	Steve Smith; Anthony Anderson	4:18
7.	"You're My Baby Girl"	B. Gunn; M. Gunn; Dick; Evan Farmer	Camara Kambon	3:27
8.	"Breaking All the Rules" (performed by Unity)	Marc Nelson; Eric Jackson; Obi Nwobosi; Ains Prasad	Nelson; Presidential Campaign	4:07
9.	"U + Me = Us (Calculus)" (Dream Maker Club Mix)	B. Gunn; M. Gunn; Schwartz; Kierulf	KNS Productions; Kevin Haskins (add.); Doug DeAngelis (add.)	5:01
10.	"Rub One Out" (Karaoke Version) (performed by Whoa! + U (The Star))	B. Gunn; M. Gunn; Schwartz; Kierulf; Dick; Glaze; Fromm	KNS Productions	2:49

== Singles ==
- "U + Me = Us (Calculus)" – released January 2000; did not chart.
- "Say It (Don't Spray It)" – released April 2000; did not chart.
- "Before We Say Goodbye" – released June 2000; did not chart.

== Personnel ==
2gether

- Jerry O'Keefe – Evan Farmer
- Q.T. McKnight – Michael Cuccione
- Mickey Parke – Alex Solowitz
- Chad Linus – Noah Bastian
- Doug Linus – Kevin Farley

Additional personnel

- Bob Buss, Alan Blumenfeld - Manager
- Nigel Dick, John Houlihan, Maggie Malina – executive soundtrack producers
- Julie Glaze Houlihan – music supervisor
- Patricia Joseph – soundtrack album producer for TVT Soundtrax
- Jackie Susan – business affairs for TVT Soundtrax
- Allison Heaps – music coordinator
- Mark Ruberg – additional album coordination for TVT Soundtrax
- Ben Wheelock – album art direction
- Phil Klum – mastering

== Charts ==
Album

Year	Chart	Position
2000	The Billboard 200	35
