= 2gether: Again =

Studio album by 2gether
- Released: August 29, 2000
- Genres: Pop; R&B; Dance-pop
- Length: 48:28
- Label: TVT
- Producers: Travis Lane; Athoas Brown; James Carter; Ivan Norwood; I-Roc; Brian Kierulf; Joshua Schwartz; Dennis Lambert; Philippe Saisse; Veit Renn; Tony Battaglia; Michael "Smidi" Smith; Brian Stekler; Camara Kambon; Paul Murray; Al Kasha; Randy Cantor; Kevin Houlihan; Julie Glaze; Steve Durkee

2gether chronology
2gether (2000)	2gether: Again (2000)

Professional ratings
Review scores
Source	Rating
Allmusic	3/5 stars

2gether: Again is the sophomore and final album by the fictional boy band 2gether, released in 2000. It serves as the soundtrack album for the 2ge+her television series, just as their first album soundtracked the made-for-MTV movie that introduced the band.

Unlike their previous comedic album, intended for the one-off comedy television movie special, this album has a different approach. Due to the success of that film, with the extended television series tied to this album, 2gether becomes a solidified ensemble, and thus this release features a more professional and commercial production tone.

The album includes the single "Awesum Luvr", and the hit single "The Hardest Part of Breaking Up (Is Getting Back Your Stuff)", which came in after two weeks on SoundScan singles charts at #14, five slots ahead of the champions at the time, 'N Sync.

This became the last album for the group as member Michael Cuccione, who played Jason "QT" McKnight, would lose a lifelong battle with cancer just a few months later at the age of 16. The band decided not to continue without him and parted ways not long after.

== Track listing ==
Original Pressing (TVT 6840-2)
No.	Title	Writer(s)	Length
1.	"5gether"	Carter, Charles, Gunn, Gunn, Lane, Norwood, Troutman, Troutman	4:11
2.	"The Hardest Part of Breaking Up (Is Getting Back Your Stuff)"	Kierulf, Schwartz	3:17
3.	"Every Minute, Every Hour"	Dorough, Fromm, Kierulf, Schwartz	3:16
4.	"That's When I'll Be Gone"	Lambert, Saisse	3:45
5.	"Awesum Luvr"	Gunn, Gunn, Renn	3:55
6.	"I Gave My 24-7 to You"	Battaglia, Gross	3:55
7.	"Right Where It Counts"	Gunn, Gunn, Steckler	3:53
8.	"Sister"	Gorder, Rowe, Smith	4:00
9.	"The Way You Do Me"	Kambon, Schulman, Schuman	3:32
10.	"You're the Only One That's Real"	Kasha, Morton	3:12
11.	"I Wanna Know Your Name"	Rogers, Sturken	4:03
12.	"U and U and Me"	Houlihan, Kostiner	3:27
13.	"Regular Guy"	Gunn, Gunn, Solowitz	4:02

Alternate Pressing (TVT 6843-2)
No.	Title	Writer(s)	Length
14.	"That's When I'll Be Gone" (Taco Version)	Lambert, Saisse	3:59

== Singles ==
- "The Hardest Part Of Breaking Up (Is Getting Back Your Stuff)" - released August 1, 2000.
- "Awesum Luvr" - released November 14, 2000; did not chart.

== Personnel ==
- Evan Farmer – vocals, background vocals
- Noah Bastian – vocals, background vocals
- Michael Cuccione – vocals, background vocals
- Kevin Farley – vocals, background vocals
- Alex Solowitz – vocals, background vocals, co-writing on "Regular Guy"
- Nigel Dick – writing
- Andrew Fromm – writing
- Brian Gunn – writing
- Mark Gunn – writing
- Brian Kierulf – writing
- Veit Renn – writing
- Joshua M. Schwartz – writing
- Brian Steckler – writing, production

== Charts ==
Album

Year	Chart	Position
2000	The Billboard 200	15

Single

Year	Chart	Position
2000	The Billboard Hot 100	87
