= Kevin Farley =

American actor (born 1965)

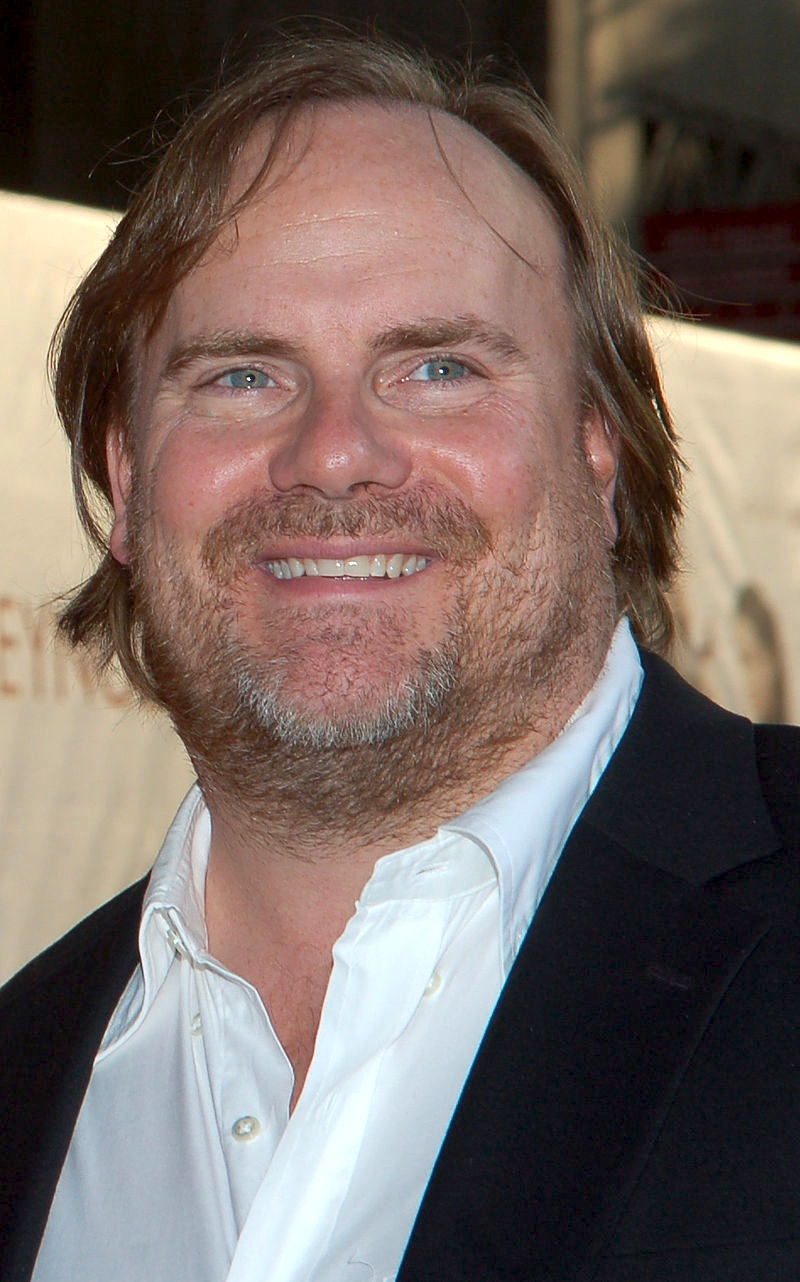
- Farley at the June 2009 premiere for The Proposal
- Born: Kevin Prindiville Farley; June 8, 1965 (age 61); Madison, Wisconsin, U.S.
- Occupations: Actor; comedian; writer; producer; director
- Years active: 1994–present
- Spouses: Denise Trotter (m. 2004; div. 2007); Michelle Wendt (m. 2021)
- Relatives: Chris Farley (brother); John Farley (brother); Jim Farley (cousin)
- Website: kevinfarleyofficial.com

Kevin Prindiville Farley (born June 8, 1965) is an American actor. He is best known for playing the lead role in David Zucker’s comedy film An American Carol (2008) and voiced several characters in F Is for Family (2015–2021). He is the younger brother of the late American comedian and actor Chris Farley, who died in 1997.

== Early life, family and education ==
Kevin Farley was born in Madison, Wisconsin, the son of Mary Anne (née Crosby), a homemaker, and Thomas Farley, who owned an oil company, Scotch Oil. He is the younger brother of comic Chris Farley and older brother of actor John P. Farley.

Like Chris, Kevin attended and graduated from Marquette University.

== Career ==
He was a regular performer in Sports Bar, a sketch-comedy show that ran from 1997 to 1998. Farley then portrayed Doug Linus in the fictional boy band 2ge+her from 2000 to 2001.

He has appeared alongside many of his brother Chris' Saturday Night Live castmates, such as David Spade and Adam Sandler. He appeared in The Waterboy (a Sandler film) and in Dirty Work. He played a police officer in the 2001 film Joe Dirt, starring David Spade. He appeared as himself alongside sidekick Ketchup Boy played by his brother Chris, in a "Cooking with Randy" sketch on All That with Kenan Thompson.

In 2004, Farley guest-starred as Bud the Janitor on the Nickelodeon television series Drake & Josh in the season 2 episode "Honor Council", and in 2006 as Officer Norkin in the season 4 episode "The Wedding", in which he gave Drake Parker and Josh Nichols a parking ticket in a 1970s Chevrolet El Camino for parking in a prohibited area. He also appeared in Joe Dirt 2 - Beautiful Loser as Cal. In 2017, Farley appeared as Earl in the music video for the Rascal Flatts' single "Yours If You Want It", alongside Kristy Swanson. He portrayed Felix the limo driver on Disney's That's So Raven.

He has continued to perform in episodes of TV sitcoms. In 2016, he made a guest appearance as Turkey in the It's Always Sunny in Philadelphia season 11 episode "The Gang Hits the Slopes". He appeared on the HBO series Curb Your Enthusiasm as an exterminator in the episode "The Rat Dog". He guest starred in an episode of the TV sitcom Rules of Engagement. He performed as the NRA gun-toting protester Eric in Superstore season 2 episode, "Guns, Pills and Birds".

He has appeared in several music videos. In 2005, Farley appeared in the Lifehouse video for the band's single "Blind". His character is a neglectful father who brings different women home, where he lives with his daughter, played by Tina Majorino. Farley appeared as the kidnapped beer truck driver in the 2010 music video for "This Afternoon" by Nickelback.

Farley was also in a Dairy Queen commercial advertising the Kit Kat Blizzard, and in commercials for Hertz Rent-A-Car.

He starred in the political parody film An American Carol, with Kelsey Grammer and Jon Voight, in 2008. Farley appeared on The View on September 30, 2008 to promote the film.

In 2007, Farley was featured in the web serial Two Guys Drinking at a Bar.

In May 2010, Farley appeared as a guest on Tom Green's House Tonight, where he performed a section of his new stand-up routine.

He directed the film Hollywood & Wine, which was released in 2011. On May 9, 2013, Farley was a featured guest for Sirius/XM radio on the Jason Ellis Show. Also in 2013, Paranormal Movie, a spoof film of Paranormal Activity, was released. Farley directed and also co-stars in the film, alongside his brother John, Carly Craig, Nicky Whelan, William Katt, Tom Sizemore, Maria Menounos, Kevin Sorbo, Quinton Aaron, Deep Roy, and Academy Award nominee Eric Roberts.

In 2015, Kevin and John appeared in the documentary I Am Chris Farley, about the life of their brother, Chris. He also filmed the independent film Crowning Jules in South Bend, Indiana. In 2015, Farley, along with Jaleel White and Pauly Shore, appeared on the series Hawaii Five-0 in the Season 5 episode "Ho'amoano (Chasing Yesterday)", which first aired on April 24, 2015.

== Political views ==
Farley has identified himself as a conservative. He attended the 2008 Republican National Convention.

== Filmography ==
=== Film ===
Year	Tile	Role	Notes
1994	Ethos	Barfly	
1995	Tommy Boy	Guy at Dad's Party	Uncredited
1996	Black Sheep	Bouncer	
1997	Beverly Hills Ninja	Policeman	
1998	Dirty Work	Theater Worker	
1998	The Waterboy	Jim Simonds	
1999	The Breaks	Police Officer	
1999	The Straight Story	Harald Olsen	
1999	Love Stinks	Sheriff	
2000	Big Wind on Campus	Kevin "Bear" Cutterback	
2000	Garage: A Rock Saga	Cult Leader Phil	
2001	Joe Dirt	Officer Doughrity	
2002	Frank McKlusky, C.I.	Jimmy	
2002	The Third Wheel	Bus Driver	
2002	Eight Crazy Nights	Panda Express Giant Panda	
2003	Dickie Roberts: Former Child Star	Valet	
2004	Johnson Family Vacation	Stall Guy	
2005	Callback	Moe Jones	
2005	The Basement	Stu	
2006	Danny Roane: First Time Director	K.C.	
2007	L.A. Blues	Cop # 2	
2007	Wild Girls Gone	Landlord	
2007	Hollywood Dot Com	Kevin	
2007	Hertz: Spy	Himself	
2007	Two Guys Drinking at a Bar	Kevin	Short
2008	Blonde and Blonder	Leo	
2008	Dog Gone	Bud	
2008	An American Carol	Michael Malone	
2009	The Gold & the Beautiful	Victor Howard	
2010	Winner: Best Short Film	Director	Short
2010	Hollywood and Wine	Bruno	Also writer and director
2011	The Elevator	Kelly	Short
2011	Cellmates	Bubba	
2011	Shooting for Something Else	Joe	Short
2011	Boy Toy	Robert	
2011	Tomorrow's End	Joe	
2012	Shit People Say to Servers in Hollywood	Himself	
2013	Paranormal Movie	Larry Fillmore	Also director
2013	David Spade Catfish?	Himself	Short
2014	We're Here to Help!	Himself	Short
2014	The Right to a Right Life	Karl Republican	Short
2014	The Yank	Fred Finnegan	
2014	Roswell FM	Ralph Cheeks	
2014	Dude, Where's My Dog?!	Frank	
2014	Merry Ex Mas	Tiny Williams	
2015	Joe Dirt 2: Beautiful Loser	Cal	
2015	I Am Chris Farley	Himself	Documentary; also executive producer
2016	Wild Bunch on Ice	Reg Locker	
2017	Pitching Tents	Neal	
2017	The Bigfoot Project	Willie Ray	
2017	Crowning Jules	Chuck	
2018	Frat Pack	Michaelson	
2020	The Truth About Santa Claus	Gary	
2021	The Baby Pact	Judge Anthony Steel	
2022	A Genie's Tail	Joseph the Jovial	
2022	1Up	Dean Davis	
2023	Grumpy Old Santa	Kris Walters	
2025	Bart Bagalzby and the Garbage Genie	Hamahan	
2025	Pickleball †	Father Joseph	Post-production; also executive producer
2025	Fallen Cards †	Ben Horowitz	Completed
2025	Hassle at the Castle †	Easton	Pre-Production

Key
†	Denotes film or TV productions that have not yet been released

=== Television ===
Year	Title	Role	Notes
1997-1998	Sports Bar	Regular performer	Main role
1997	3rd Rock from the Sun	Jehovah's Witness	Episode: "A Nightmare on Dick Street: Part 1"; uncredited
1997	Head Over Heels	Fred	Episode: "One Down"
1997-1998	The Tom Show	George	4 episodes
1998	That '70s Show	Matthew Erdman	Episode: "Drive-In"
1999	Misguided Angel	Corky	8 episodes
2000	2gether	Doug Linus	Television film
2000	Then Came You	Andy	Episode: "Then Came a Wedding"
2000	Making the Video	Doug Linus	Episode: "2gether – "The Hardest Part Of Breaking Up"
2000-2001	2gether: The Series	Doug Linus	Main role
2001	The Howard Stern Radio Show	Himself	Episode: "March 22, 2001"
2001	The Test	Himself	Episode: "The Kick Ass Test"
2002	A Nero Wolfe Mystery	Corn/ Bomb Delivery Man	Episode: "Murder is Corny"
2002	Biography	Himself	Episode: "Chris Farley: Reckless Laughter"
2002-2003	Just Shoot Me!	Various roles	5 episodes
2003-2004	Stripperella	Henchman 1	Voice, 2 episodes
2004	Happy Family	Karl Pinski	Episode: "The Play"
2003-2004	It's All Relative	Mike	4 episodes
2004	8 Simple Rules	Steven Tyler's roadie	Voice, uncredited
2004	Complete Savages	Fireman No. 1	Episode: "Almost Men in Uniform"
2004	The Sheboygan Improv Festival	Himself	Short; also director, executive producer, and producer
2005	Back to Norm	Terrorist	Television film
2005	That's So Raven	Felix	Episode: "Save the Last Dance"
2004-2005	Joey	Man/ Drunk Santa	2 episodes
2005	Hot Properties	Fletcher	2 episodes
2006	Mind of Mencia	Matthew	Episode: "That's F**king Historical"
2004-2006	Drake & Josh	Bud/Officer Norkin	3 episodes
2007	Monk	JJ The Joke Machine	Episode: "Mr. Monk Is on the Air"
2007	Curb Your Enthusiasm	Mike the Exterminator	Episode: "The Rat Dog"
2008	The O'Reilly Factor	Michael Malome	Episode: "September 18, 2008"; archive footage
2008	The Tonight Show with Jay Leno	Himself	Episode: "#16.162"
2008	Talkshow with Spike Feresten	Himself	Episode: "Kevin Farley"
2009	Troopathon 2009: Honor Their Service	Himself	Television special
2009	'Til Death	Steve	Episode: "The Buffer"
2009	The Movie Showcast	Himself	Television Special
2010	The Kevin Nealon Show	Himself	Main role
2010	Love That Girl!	Curtis Williams	Episode: "Pilot"
2010	United States of Tara	Social Worker	Episode: "Dept. of F'd Up Family Services"; uncredited
2011	Zeke and Luther	Coach Carp	Episode: "Two Guys, a car, and a Wild Bear"
2009-2011	True Jackson, VP	Officer Hooley	3 episodes
2011	Nick Swardson's Pretend Time	Pilgrim Randy	Episode: "Flying Stripper"
2011-2014; 2019	Laugh Factory	Himself	Episode: "Flashback Fridays: Food Jokes"; also writer; 3 episodes
2012	The Jadagrace Show	Wendell	5 episodes
2013	Hot in Cleveland	Ranger Murphy	Episode: "Fast and Furious"
2013	Rules of Engagement	Dave	Episode: "Fountain of Youth"
2013	The Haunted Hathaways	Big Ronnie	Episode: "Haunted Bakery"
2013	The Neighbors	Alan	Episode: "Supreme Like Me"
2014	The Fame Game	Elmer Hart	Episode: "Pilot"
2014	Kickin' It	Coach Bob	Episode: "Martinez & Malone: Mall Cops!"
2014	Model Citizen	Keith	Television film
2015	Inside Edition	Himself	Episode: "#26.112"; archive footage
2015	Today	Himself	Episode: "July 31, 2015"
2015	The Tiara Talk Show	Himself	Episode: "Kevin Farley"
2015	Film Pigs	The Supporting Character/ Himself- Guest Host	Episode: "So Farley"
2015	Hawaii Five-0	Mickey Dickson	Episode: "Ho'amoano"
2015	To Appomattox	Henry Hallek	5 episodes
2016	It's Always Sunny in Philadelphia	Turkey	Episode: "The Gang Hits the Slopes"
2016	Superstore	Eric	Episode: "Guns, Pills and Birds"
2016-2017	Still the King	Mitch Dolly	17 episodes
2016-2018	Drunk History	Al Capone/ James Murray	2 episodes
2018	Tomboy	Randy	Television film
2019	Good Morning America	Himself	Episode: "#44.103"
2019	Chris Farley: Anything for a Laugh	Himself	Television film; also executive producer
2019	Treat Yourself	Himself	Episode: "Treat Yourself: Kevin Farley"
2012-2019	From The Mouth Of Babes	Himself	3 Episodes
2021	City on a Hill	Neighbor	Episode: "Pax Bostonia"
2015-2021	F Is for Family	Various voices	31 Episodes
2022	Everybody Has an Andy Dick Story	Himself	Documentary
2022	The Very VERY Best of the 80s	Himself	Episode: "Action Movie Stars"
2022	Growing Up Toxic	Himself	Episode: "Vol 2"
2023	Somethin' Crunchy	Himself	Episode: "Kevin Farley joins SOMETHIN' CRUNCHY"
2024	The Really Loud House	Franklin Whitecollar	Episode: "A Really Loud Thanksgiving: The Gobble Squabble Debacle"

=== Podcast ===
Year	Title	Role	Notes
2021–present	Offsides with Kevin Farley	Himself (host)	
2023	The Bystanders	Manager Kel	Episode: "Stick it to the Mann"

== Discography ==
=== As featuring artist ===
Song	Year	Album
"U + Me = Us (Calculus)" (2gether featuring Kevin Farley as Doug Linus)	2000	2Gether
"The Hardest Part of Breaking Up (Is Getting Back Your Stuff)" (2gether featuring Kevin Farley as Doug Linus)	2000	2Gether: Again
"Awesum Luvr" (2gether featuring Kevin Farley as Doug Linus)	2000	2Gether: Again
"Blind" (Featuring Kevin Farley and Tina Majorino"	2005	Lifehouse
"Yours If You Want It" (Featuring Kevin Farley and Kristy Swanson)	2017	Back to Us
