= Ice Spiders =

- DVD Cover Image for Ice Spiders
- Written by: Eric Miller
- Directed by: Tibor Takács
- Starring: Patrick Muldoon; Vanessa Estelle Williams; Thomas Calabro; David Millbern; Noah Bastian
- Theme music composer: Penka Kouneva; Vivek Maddala
- Country of origin: United States
- Original language: English

Production
- Producers: Paul Colichman; Andreas Hess; Sylvia Hess; Stephen P. Jarchow; James R. Rosenthal
- Cinematography: Barry Gravelle
- Editors: Danny Draven; John Blizek
- Running time: 86 minutes
- Budget: $2,000,000

Original release
- Network: Syfy Channel
- Release: June 9, 2007

Ice Spiders is a 2007 science fiction horror film which premiered on June 9, 2007 on the Syfy Channel. A team of young Winter Olympic hopefuls must slalom to safety when a horde of giant mutated spiders spin their way out of a top secret laboratory. Ice Spiders stars Patrick Muldoon, Vanessa Estelle Williams, Noah Bastian, K. Danor Gerald and Matt Whittaker and was released on DVD in 2007.

== Plot ==
On a restricted side of a Utah mountain, Dr. April Sommers is working to create a new breed of spider with several other scientists. Chad, a new teen arrival to the ski resort side of the mountain, challenges ski resort worker and retired Olympic skier Dan "Dash" Dashiell to a race. During the contest, Dash turns away from a large rocky slope rather than risk a leg injury like the one that ruined his career, and meets Dr. Sommers as he makes it to the bottom. Frank Stone takes the teens inside his resort. Dr. Sommers returns to the lab, where she finds everyone dead, except for one survivor cocooned in a spider web. Before the survivor dies, he warns Dr. Sommers about the spiders escaping. The last spider remaining at the lab, a mutated black widow, attacks Dr. Sommers and forces her into a locked office. She sounds an alarm, alerting Professor Marks and Army Captain Baker, who are elsewhere on the mountain.

Back at the lodge, Dash meets up with Ranger Rick,who asks for assistance finding two missing hunters. They find the hunters' truck, and a mutilated elk Dash assumes to have been killed by a bear. Dash and Rick locate one of the hunter's bodies, and encounter the other cocooned in a large spider web. As Dash and Rick turn to run, Rick is snagged by a web and killed by a spider. Dash makes it back to the hunters' truck and hot-wires it to get away.

Back at the lab, Professor Marks, Captain Baker, and a squad of soldiers enter the compound. The spider attacks and kills one of the soldiers. Dr. Sommers steals records of the experiment and realizes Professor Marks deliberately accelerated the spiders' growth, which makes them larger, faster, and stronger. However, it also causes them great hunger and prevents the cold from killing them. Sommers had been desperate to obtain sufficient amounts of spider webbing for new armor ideas.

Dr. Sommers meets up with Frank and Johnny at the lodge, which has been invaded by the spiders. Frank and Dr. Sommers watch the spiders kill several guests, including the teens' ski coach. Later, Frank sees the teens hiding in a shed and leads them to a bus. Chad gets the keys and drives off, but when a black widow crawls onto the windshield, Chad crashes the bus into a snow bank. Dash returns to the hotel and helps secure it. When he and Dr. Sommers search the basement, a spider gets in and almost attacks them, but they stun it with a fire extinguisher and lock it in the basement. Back in the lobby, a spider crawls in through the chimney and kills two guests before Dash impales it with the antlers of a mounted deer head.

Meanwhile, on the crashed bus, Frank checks the area and makes sure the kids are okay. However, one of them is unconscious and injured. The group thinks of a way to exit the bus as the black widow tries to get inside. Eventually, Frank traps the spider and the kids escape. Frank is nearly killed, but is rescued thanks to the timely arrival of Captain Baker and his squad. Back at the lodge, Dash devises a plan with Captain Baker to trap the spiders. Dash takes his skis and leads the spiders to a snowboard half-pipe, which Baker and his men are blocking off. Johnny heads toward an avalanche cannon and waits for Dash's signal. At the half-pipe, the spiders are captured and Dash signals Johnny, who blows the spiders up. Professor Marks, who had been opposed to killing the spiders, charges at Dash and tries to kill him. Marks falls down the side of the half-pipe towards the last spider, which kills him as Baker shoots the beast.

A government agent arrives with a group of soldiers that begin destroying all traces of the spiders. The agent demands that the survivors keep quiet about recent events and says that the "official" explanation for what happened will be that there was a spill of hallucinogenic chemicals.

== Cast ==
- Patrick Muldoon as Dan 'Dash' Dashiell
- Vanessa Estelle Williams as Dr. April Sommers
- Thomas Calabro as Capt. Baker
- David Millbern as Prof. Marks
- Noah Bastian as Chad Brown
- Carleigh King as Brittany
- Stephen J. Cannell as Frank Stone
- Matt Whittaker as Steven
- Clayton Taylor as Quintin
- Charles Halford as Coach Mike
- Steve Bilich as Coach Palmer
- Kiernan Ryan Daley as Rosen (as Kiernan Daley)
- Cory McMillan as Perez (as Cory McMillian)
- Connie Young as Mrs. Stewart
- Marc Raymond as Mr. Stewart
- James C. Morris as Joseph
- Johnny Tall as Johnny
- Christopher Robin Miller as Bob (as Chris Miller)
- Paul Kiernan as Rocky
- K. Danor Gerald as Ranger Rick Dickerson
- Phil Riesen as Shadowy Man
- Kerry Pence as Panicky Tourist
- Jill Adler as Female Skier
- Amee Walden as Christina
- Angel Fisher as Cleaning Maid Gretchen

== Home media ==
Ice Spiders was released to DVD on October 18, 2007.

== Reception ==
On Rotten Tomatoes the film has 3 reviews, all positive.

Mark H. Harris of Black Horror Movies called it "a movie that doesn't try to be anything more than it is" while Felix Vasquez Jr. of Cinema Crazed said it was "A great little B grade monster mash..." and Kevin Carr of 7M Pictures wrote "I know this film isn't for most people, but I had a lot of fun watching it."
