= Michael Cuccione =

Canadian child actor (1985–2001)

- Born: Michael James Cuccione; January 5, 1985; Burnaby, British Columbia, Canada
- Died: January 13, 2001 (aged 16); Vancouver, British Columbia, Canada
- Occupations: Actor; singer; dancer; author
- Years active: 1997–2001

Michael James Cuccione (January 5, 1985 – January 13, 2001) was a Canadian actor, singer, dancer, author, and cancer research activist. He was best known for his role as "Jason 'Q.T.' McKnight" in the fictional boy band 2gether, part of a self-titled MTV movie and spin-off television series.

== Biography ==
=== Personal life ===
Cuccione was born to Dominic and Gloria Cuccione in Burnaby, British Columbia, and raised in neighbouring Coquitlam. He had a sister, Sophia, and brother, Steven.

=== Entertainment career ===
In July 1997, a request Cuccione made to meet Baywatch star David Hasselhoff led to an acting role in an episode based on real-life cancer patient Charlie Everett Hays.

The producers of 2gether had already agreed to shoot the TV movie (and later the eponymous TV series) in Vancouver when they discovered Cuccione and cast him in the part of Jason "QT" McKnight. The movie was released on February 21, 2000 and the series followed on August 15 of that same year, on MTV's 10 Spot. The series was an immediate hit, as was the subsequent soundtrack from the show. The spoof boy band became so popular with fans and artists that they went on tour with Britney Spears. Both soundtracks were hits, with the latter reaching #26 on the Billboard Top 100.

=== Illness and advocacy ===
In 1994, when Cuccione was 9, he was diagnosed with stage 2A Hodgkin's lymphoma, a form of cancer affecting the lymph nodes. It was treated with five months of chemotherapy, but returned the following year. His second bout with the disease metastasized to his lungs. He required massive doses of chemotherapy, a bone marrow transplant, and twelve radiation treatments around his heart and lungs. He was then cancer free, but the treatment left him with permanent lung and respiratory problems.

Cuccione became a well-known campaigner for cancer research and awareness. The singer/actor established The Michael Cuccione Foundation for Cancer Research and turned his love for music into a fundraising effort by recording a five-song CD, Make a Difference. He also co-authored a book with his grandmother titled, There are Survivors: The Michael Cuccione Story about his experiences battling cancer; his effort eventually raised C$500,000, which was donated to the British Columbia Children's Hospital. Cuccione made many in-person appearances on television, radio, at schools and hospitals, and other fundraising events. As of 2024, the foundation has raised $26 million for cancer research, and both of Cuccione's parents have received the Order of British Columbia, the province's highest form of recognition, for their work with the foundation.

=== Death ===
As the second season of 2gether started taping, Cuccione soon began suffering breathing problems from complications from his earlier cancer treatments and required an oxygen tank on-set. His problems increased, and soon he had to miss several tapings of the show and the public group appearances. In December 2000, Cuccione was unable to fight off the effects of a minor car accident and entered the hospital on December 4, 2000, with pneumonia. He spent the rest of his stay on a ventilator and celebrated his last Christmas, New Year's, and birthday in the hospital before succumbing to respiratory failure, which caused his death on January 13, 2001, eight days after his 16th birthday.

More than 2000 people filled Saint Helen's Catholic church in the Vancouver suburb of Burnaby on the Wednesday evening of January 17, 2001, and again on the next morning. All four of Cuccione's 2gether band/cast members were in attendance for both services. Also in attendance was David Hasselhoff, who gave the eulogy and dedicated a song at the Wednesday services. Canadian Prime Minister Jean Chrétien sent his condolences. Both services included a 75-member choir from Cuccione's high school, Notre Dame Regional Secondary School. Among the items displayed were pictures of Cuccione being blessed by Pope John Paul II, a giant poster of Cuccione with a teddy bear, and a massive set of wreaths and flowers. During the Thursday services, a procession of limousines, cars, and firetrucks accompanied Cuccione's casket through the streets of Metro Vancouver.

2gether split up following Cuccione's death. Actor Kevin Farley stated “That was a big blow to everything. Everybody was so sad that it was hard (to continue) after that,” while series Creator and Executive Producer Mark Gunn noted “We all felt like, the season was over, and it was a perfect time to sort of all move on and do other things.”

== Filmography ==
- Baywatch (1997) as Charlie Giminski
- You, Me and the Kids (1998-2001)
- 2gether (February 2000) as Jason "QT" McKnight
- 2gether (series) (August 2000) as Jason "QT" McKnight
- Making the Video (August 2000) as Jason "QT" McKnight

== Discography ==
- Make a Difference
- 2gether (soundtrack)
- 2gether: Again (soundtrack)
- Messages from Above

== Bibliography ==
- Michael Cuccione, Jane MacSporran (1998). There Are Survivors: The Michael Cuccione Story. ISBN 9780968318805.
