= John Farley (actor) =

American actor and comedian (b. 1968)

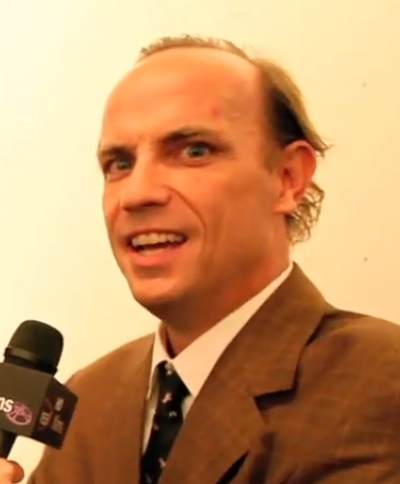
- Farley in 2010
- Born: John Patrick Farley; October 29, 1968 (age 58); Madison, Wisconsin, U.S.
- Occupations: Actor; comedian
- Years active: 1984–present
- Spouse: Jennifer Herron (m. 2005)
- Children: 3
- Relatives: Chris Farley (brother); Kevin Farley (brother); Jim Farley (cousin)

John Patrick Farley (born October 29, 1968) is an American actor and comedian. He is the youngest brother of actor and comedian Chris Farley.

== Early life and education ==
Farley was born in Madison, Wisconsin, to Thomas John Farley Sr., owner of The Scotch Oil Company, and Mary Jane Farley. He was raised in an Irish Catholic family, as the youngest brother of actors Chris Farley and Kevin Farley. John Farley went on to earn a Bachelor of Art’s in marketing from Regis University in 1992 and later studied at The Second City in Chicago.

== Career ==
Farley has received many roles from his older brother's fellow SNL alums, such as Adam Sandler, David Spade, and Rob Schneider. His notable film work includes The Waterboy and The Benchwarmers. He also has small roles in You Don't Mess with the Zohan, Joe Dirt, Almost Heroes, and Extreme Movie. He also appears on multiple episodes of Frank TV and in one episode on the sitcom Rules of Engagement.

In 1997, he appeared as a regular performer in Sports Bar, a sketch-comedy show that ended in 1998.

In 2015, Farley appeared, with his brother, Kevin, in the documentary I Am Chris Farley, about the life of his brother, Chris, alongside many other Hollywood stars, like Adam Sandler and Dan Aykroyd.

In 2019, Farley appeared on the Comedy Central series Lights Out with David Spade, where he is also the television show's announcer.

== Personal life ==
He is married to actress Jennifer Herron and has three children. On December 18, 1997, Farley found his older brother Chris Farley dead from a drug overdose.

== Filmography ==
=== Film ===
Year	Title	Role	Notes
1995	Tommy Boy	Roy	Uncredited
1996	Black Sheep	Bouncer	
1997	Beverly Hills Ninja	Policeman	
1998	Almost Heroes	Bartender	
1998	The Waterboy	Tony Dodd	
1999	The Breaks	Police Officer	
1999	The Straight Story	Thorvald	
2000	Big Wind on Campus	Scooter	
2000	Little Nicky	Human Dartboard	
2000	Garage: A Rock Saga	Cult Leader Gary	
2001	The Animal	Other Mob	
2001	Joe Dirt	Security Guard	
2001	Corky Romano	Ice Cream Vendor	
2002	Eight Crazy Nights	Cop #2 (voice)	Uncredited
2003	Dickie Roberts: Former Child Star	Referee	
2005	Deuce Bigalow: European Gigolo	Naked Bike Cop	Uncredited
2006	Loving Annabelle	Male Detective	
2006	Dark Mind	Accident Man	
2006	The Benchwarmers	Swimmer Boy	
2007	LA Blues	Cop #1	
2007	Believers	Glasses	Direct-to-video
2007	I Now Pronounce You Chuck & Larry	Criminal	Uncredited
2007	Hollywood Dot Com	John	
2008	Blonde and Blonder	Swan	
2008	Strange Wilderness	Doctor	
2008	Dog Gone	Dad	
2008	Wieners	Cornelius	
2008	You Don't Mess with the Zohan	Tom	
2008	Get Smart	Agent 38	
2008	Extreme Movie	Mr. Matthews	
2009	The Gold & the Beautiful	Erik	
2010	House Broken	Nate the Store Manager	
2011	Life of Lemon	Jimmy	
2011	Hollywood & Wine	Joey	Also writer
2011	Boy Toy	Stu the Landlord	
2011	Jack and Jill	Mort the Hot Dog Vendor	
2011	Fully Loaded	Alex	
2013	Paranormal Movie	Jack Goff	
2013	Slightly Single in L.A.	Priest	
2014	Walk of Shame	John	
2015	Hell and Back	Welcome to Hell Demon	Voice
2015	The Ridiculous 6	Roscoe	Uncredited
2015	I Am Chris Farley	—N/a	Documentary
2017	Pitching Tents	Jack	
2017	Sandy Wexler	Miceli's Singing Waiter	
2018	Father of the Year	Wife Race Runner	
2020	The Wrong Missy	Calvin Sr.	
2020	Going Rogue	Harold	
2021	Courting Mom and Dad	Donovan Marshall	
2021	Christmas vs. The Walters	Chuck	
2022	Home Team	Championship Game Referee	
2023	Leo	Golfer #3 (voice)	
2025	Happy Gilmore 2	Nate	

=== Television ===
Year	Title	Role	Notes
1993	Roseanne	Male customer	Episode: "The Driver's Seat"
1999	Thanks	Henry Tungsley	4 episodes
1999	Frasier	Records Clerk	Episode: "The Late Dr. Crane"
2000	Honey, I Shrunk the Kids: The TV Show	Dr. Lorenzo Zeger	Episode: "Honey, Like Father, Like Son"
2000	Bette	Dracula	Episode: "Halloween"
2000, 2001	The Norm Show	Guy at Bar / Sam	2 episodes
2001	The Ellen Show	Del	Episode: "Alive and Kicking"
2003, 2004	Stripperella	Henchman #2 (voice)	2 episodes
2004	It's All Relative	Danny	3 episodes
2004	8 Simple Rules	Owner	Episode: "Mother's Day"
2005	Back to Norm	Terrorist	Television film
2005	Curb Your Enthusiasm	Knicks score man	Episode: "The Korean Bookie"
2005	Arrested Development	Clerk	Episode: "Fakin' It"
2007	Final Approach	Jimbo	Television film
2007	My Name Is Earl	Annie	Episode: "Frank's Girl"
2007	What News?	Rod Powers	Television film
2007	The Weekend	Host	Television film
2008	Frank TV	Various / Camper #2	3 episodes
2009	Rules of Engagement	Greg	Episode: "Sex Toy Story"
2009	Zeke and Luther	Lenny	Episode: "Road Trip"
2010	Farewell Mr. Kringle	Lloyd	Television film
2010	Back Nine	Bill	Television film
2010–2011	Nick Swardson's Pretend Time	Various roles	4 episodes
2011	Workaholics	Principal Sloan	Episode: "Heist School"
2012	The Book Club	Owen Ceddarrash	Episode: "The Cabin"
2013	Crash & Bernstein	Mr. Green	Episode: "Crash on the Run"
2013	Rocks Off	Boss	Television film
2019–2021	Lights Out with David Spade	Announcer / Johnny the PA	107 episodes
