= Evan Farmer =

American actor

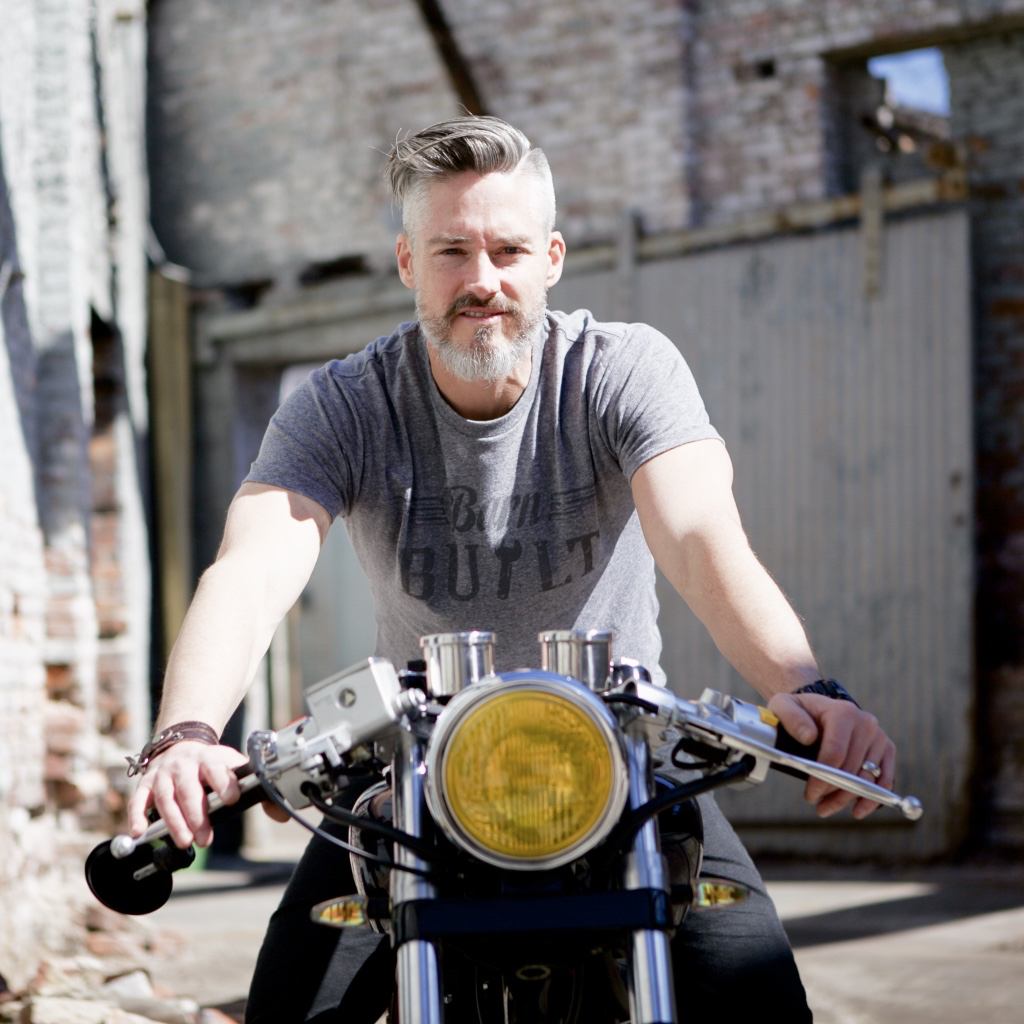
- Born: Evan Ragland Farmer, Jr. July 28, 1972 (age 54); Asmara, Ethiopia
- Occupations: Business owner, television host, radio host, actor, musician, designer/customizer, author
- Years active: 1997–present
- Spouse: Andrea Smith (m. 2005)
- Children: 2
- Website: www.evanfarmer.com

Evan Ragland Farmer Jr. (born July 28, 1972) is an American television and radio host, actor, and musician. He is best known for his lead role as Jerry O'Keefe in the MTV Film and follow-up television series 2gether, and as host and carpenter within the home-makeover television genre including Emmy-nominated While You Were Out (TLC), Freestyle (HGTV), and Door Knockers (DIY).

== Early life ==
Farmer was born in Ethiopia to American parents, and grew up in Towson, Maryland, and attended college at Tulane University, where he studied architecture.

In 2005 he married Andrea Smith, a Merrel Footwear executive.

== Career ==
=== Music ===
In 1997, Farmer was invited to join Russia's highest-selling band in history, Na Na. As part of his involvement, Farmer joined them on a stretch of their 1997 World Tour: Prykinda, which included stadium performances throughout the former Soviet Union. Farmer ultimately declined to join the band amid concerns of being out of the country for extended stretches during a time when his mother was battling cancer.

The following year Farmer began performing with 2gether, a spoof boy band, which included opening for Britney Spears on her 2000 Oops!... I Did It Again Tour.

Farmer co-wrote "You're My Baby Girl" for 2gether's first album 2ge+her, and was an un-credited co-writer on several of the songs for the follow-up album 2Ge+her Again.

=== Acting ===
In New York City, Farmer found representation from Abrams Artists Agency and began booking jobs as a print model and actor in national commercials and on soaps including a recurring stint on the Guiding Light.

The Fantasticks

In 1998, Farmer joined the cast of the original off-Broadway production of The Fantasticks, as Matt (The Boy) in its 38th year, joining a legacy in the world's longest-running musical and the longest-running uninterrupted show of any kind in the United States.

Shaft

While performing eight shows a week in The Fantasticks, Farmer spent the early part of the day auditioning for film and television work and began gaining the attention from casting directors. By 1998 he landed his first film role alongside Christian Bale in Shaft.

2Gether

It was while filming Shaft that he won the lead role as Jerry O'Keefe in MTV's first made-for-TV movie, 2gether, a film that copied the mockumentary format of This is Spinal Tap, but this time as a parody of the successful boy bands of the time period. The high ratings of the film spurred a TV series of the same name, as well as two back to back gold albums 2ge+her and 2Ge+her Again. The TV series was cancelled at the end of season 2, shortly after the death of cast member Michael Cuccione.

Austin Powers

In 2000, Farmer auditioned for the role of the Young Dr. Evil in the third of the Austin Powers Franchise, Austin Powers in Goldmember, but ended up being cast as Young Number Two, the character originated by Robert Wagner and also portrayed by Rob Lowe. Farmer became the third actor to step into the role.

Farmer has also made guest star appearances in JAG, Working Class, DAG, and voiced several characters on the MTV cartoons Daria and Celebrity Death Match.

=== Television hosting ===
While Farmer was in New York City promoting the TV Series 2gether he was approached by producers of Total Request Live (TRL) who were in need of a replacement host for Carson Daly, who was unable to get to the set for a live broadcast. Farmer hosted the live show, which was his first time in that role. With several follow-up substitutions for Daly over the next year, Farmer began focusing less on acting and more on hosting.

While You Were Out

By 2003, Farmer became the host of TLC's While You Were Out, a show where an individual sets up a friend or family member with a surprise room redecoration with the help of a crew of designers and carpenters in only two days.

Top 20 Countdown

In 2010, Farmer took over as host of CMT's weekly show Top 20 Countdown, for which he was also a producer, replacing Lance Smith, who held the job for eight years. The show ended in 2013 amid reorganization at parent company Viacom.

During that period, Farmer filmed two television pilots as Host; the first for A&E titled Dance Marathon and the second for CMT titled CMT's Dance Revolution, neither of which caught traction.

In Residence

In 2015 Farmer filmed the pilot episode as Host of a new series for United Airlines and AFAR magazine, titled In Residence: London, which seeks to provide viewers with a local's "insider perspective" of travel destinations serviced by the airlines.

Other shows

Farmer hosted the short-lived reality game show, Bride vs. Bride, which aired on We TV in 2006. He also hosted Over the Top Holiday and FreeStyle.

=== Radio hosting ===
From 2010 to 2013, Farmer joined as co-host of a weekly syndicated radio show called CMT Radio Insider along with Lisa Dent of the Lisa Dent and Ramblin' Ray Show (WUSN).
