= Brittany Curran =

American actress (born 1990)

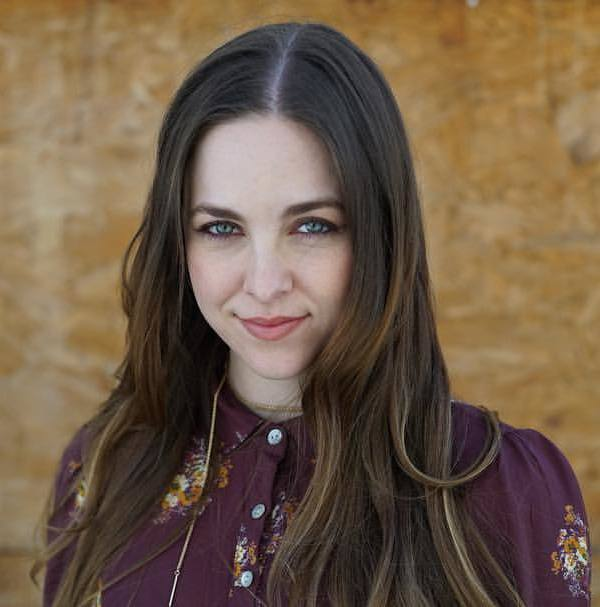
- Curran in 2017
- Born: June 2, 1990 (age 36); Weymouth, Massachusetts, U.S.
- Education: University of California, Los Angeles (BS)
- Occupation: Actress
- Years active: 2001–present
- Partner(s): James Ingram (2013–present; engaged)

Brittany Curran (born June 2, 1990) is an American film and television actress. Beginning as a child actress, she is known for her roles on the television series Men of a Certain Age and The Magicians, and for the film Dear White People. She won a Peabody Award for her work on Men of a Certain Age.

== Life and career ==
Curran was born in Weymouth, Massachusetts, and also lived in other parts of Massachusetts, including Avon, Marstons Mills, Cape Cod and Hingham. She has a younger brother named Ryan. As a child, she took part in plays and also studied ballet, jazz and tap dance, and the violin, as well as participating in summer theatre.

At eleven years of age, Curran made her screen acting debut on an episode of the sketch comedy series MADtv in 2001. She went on to guest star in the television series Drake & Josh, The Suite Life of Zack & Cody, The Suite Life on Deck, Ghost Whisperer, Criminal Minds and The Young and the Restless.

In 2009, Curran was cast in her best-known role to date as Lucy Tranelli in the TNT comedy-drama series Men of a Certain Age, the daughter of Ray Romano's character. In 2011, she was nominated for a Young Artist Award for Best Performance in a TV Series (Comedy or Drama) – Supporting Young Actress, for her work in the series. The series was canceled in 2011, after two seasons.

Curran also had roles in the films 13 Going on 30, Akeelah and the Bee, The Haunting Hour: Don't Think About It, The Uninvited, Legally Blondes and Dear White People. In 2012, she was cast in the film Backmask (retitled Exeter before release), directed by Marcus Nispel. In 2013, she had a recurring role as Phoebe Daly on the ABC Family series Twisted.

In 2017, Curran joined the cast of The Magicians on SyFy playing Fen, the Fillorian wife of Eliot. She was promoted to series regular for season 3 of the show.

== Filmography ==
=== Film ===
Year	Title	Role	Notes
2004	13 Going on 30	Six Chick	
2004	U.S. Air Marshals	Cheerleader Mindy	Short film
2004	Frenching	Stephanie	Short film
2005	A Host of Trouble	Mary Pat Weber	Short film
2005	Betsy	Betsy	Short film; also associate producer
2006	Akeelah and the Bee	District Speller #1	
2006	Monster House	Jenny	Uncredited; voice role
2007	A Lesson in Biology	Alma	Short film
2007	The Haunting Hour: Don't Think About It	Priscilla Wright	Direct-to-video
2008	The Uninvited	Helena	Direct-to-video
2008	Dog Gone	Lilly	Direct-to-video
2008	The Adventures of Food Boy	Shelby	
2009	Legally Blondes	Tiffany Donohugh	Direct-to-video
2014	Dear White People	Sophie Fletcher	
2015	Exeter	Reign	
2015	Intrepid	Jess	
2017	The Man from Earth: Holocene	Tara	
2020	Captured	Julie	Direct-to-video; filmed in 2012

=== Television ===
Year	Title	Role	Notes
2001	MADtv	Ruthie	Episode #7.8
2002	Power Rangers Wild Force	Young Girl	Episode: "The Soul of Humanity"
2004	Complete Savages	Josie	Episode: "Voodude"
2005	Go Figure	Pamela	Television film
2006	The Young and the Restless	Lindsey	Episode #1.8427
2006–2007	Drake & Josh	Carly	2 episodes
2007	Shark	Annie	Episode: "Fall from Grace"
2007	Zip	Natalie	Unaired television pilot
2007	Mr Robinson's Driving School	Missy	Television mini-series
2007	The Suite Life of Zack & Cody	Chelsea Brimmer	3 episodes
2008	The Suite Life on Deck	Chelsea Brimmer	Episode: "Flowers and Chocolate"
2009	Ghost Whisperer	Kristy Marks	Episode: "Slow Burn"
2009–2011	Men of a Certain Age	Lucy Tranelli	Main role; 13 episodes
2012	Criminal Minds	Addyson Jones	Episode: "The Wheels on the Bus..."
2013–2014	Twisted	Phoebe Daly	Recurring role; 10 episodes
2013–2014, 2018	Chicago Fire	Katie Nolan	Recurring role (season 2); guest role (season 7); 9 episodes
2015	Double Daddy	Heather Henderson	Television film
2017–2020	The Magicians	Fen	Recurring role (season 2), main role (season 3–5)

== Awards and nominations ==
Year	Award	Category	Film	Result	Ref.
2010	Peabody Award		Men of a Certain Age	Won	
2011	Young Artist Award	Best Performance in a TV Series (Comedy or Drama) - From a Supporting Young Actress	Men of a Certain Age	Nominated	
