= Pitching Tents =

- Directed by: Jacob Cooney
- Written by: Rob A. Fox; Jayme Petrille
- Produced by: Rob A. Fox; David Gere; Jayme Petrille
- Starring: Michael Grant; Jim Norton; Booboo Stewart; Samantha Basalari; Jonathan Lipnicki
- Cinematography: Christopher Bye
- Edited by: David Hopper
- Music by: Zack Ryan
- Production company: Meritage Pictures
- Release date: 31 March 2017
- Running time: 92 minutes
- Country: United States
- Language: English

Pitching Tents is a 2017 American comedy-drama film directed by Jacob Cooney, starring Michael Grant, Jim Norton, Booboo Stewart, Samantha Basalari and Jonathan Lipnicki.

== Cast ==
- Michael Grant as Danny
- Jim Norton as Mr. Mulligan
- Booboo Stewart as Todd
- Samantha Basalari as Alison
- Jonathan Lipnicki as Scott
- Eric Allan Kramer as Bruce
- Spencer Daniels as Stash
- Marco James as Phil
- Michelle Duffy as Caroline
- Josh Caras as Pete
- Chris Ellis as Principal Don Bishop
- John Farley as Jack
- Kevin Farley as Neal
- Vincent Pastore as Tony
- Richard Riehle as Grandpa
- Ashley Kate Adams as Becca
- Kabby Borders as Shelley
- Kendra Cantara as Dawn
- Madison Coppola as Adrianne
- Ashley Couture as Kim
- David Gere as Mike the Cop
- Kathy Searle as Ms. Keyes

== Reception ==
Katie Walsh of the Los Angeles Times wrote that the film "is all cutesy retro raunchiness without any innovation or comedic payoff", and that "it might have been excusable back in the day, but now it’s just boring."

Joe Leydon of Variety wrote that "the perpetrators of this throwback flotsam have been so diligent in their efforts to replicate the look, tone and smirk of those instantly forgettable trifles, their movie could almost pass for a thirtysomething-year-old feature only recently recovered from a time capsule."
