= Paranormal Movie =

- Film poster
- Directed by: Kevin Farley
- Written by: Lisa Baget
- Produced by: Jesse Baget; Benjamin Scott
- Starring: Kevin Farley; Carly Craig; Nicky Whelan; Eric Roberts; William Katt; Tom Sizemore; Maria Menounos; John P. Farley; Deep Roy
- Cinematography: Alexander Yellen
- Edited by: Dan O'Brien
- Music by: Richard Figone
- Production company: Paranormal Movie
- Distributed by: Image Entertainment
- Release date: April 9, 2013
- Running time: 88 minutes
- Country: United States
- Language: English

Paranormal Movie is a 2013 American parody comedy horror film directed by Kevin Farley. The film is a spoof of the Paranormal Activity series.

== Premise ==
A man, long haunted by the paranormal, captures on camera the horror and hilarity he and his beautiful girlfriend encounter after moving into a new home.

== Cast ==
- Kevin Farley as Larry Fillmore
- Carly Craig as Katie MacDonald
- Nicky Whelan as Cindy
- Eric Roberts as Dr. Lipschitz
- William Katt as Himself
- Tom Sizemore as Himself
- Maria Menounos as Dr. Luni
- John P. Farley as Jack Goff
- Deep Roy as Demon
- Kevin Sorbo as Security Guard
- Quinton Aaron as Himself
- Robert Hays as Himself/Director
