= The Yank =

2014 film directed by Sean Lackey

- Film poster
- Directed by: Sean Lackey
- Written by: Sean Lackey
- Starring: Colm Meaney; Fred Willard; Kevin Farley; Niki Spiridakos; Nicole Forester; Sean Lackey
- Cinematography: Keith Nickoson
- Edited by: David Jingo
- Music by: Chris Ainscough
- Production company: Wet Ears Productions
- Distributed by: Vision Films (US); Bulldog Film Distribution (UK and Ireland)
- Release date: March 23, 2014 (Cleveland)
- Country: United States
- Language: English

The Yank is a 2014 American independent comedy film written, directed and starring Sean Lackey.

== Plot ==
Irish American, Tom Murphy, is the first in his family to go to Ireland. His family sees this as an opportunity to marry "his own kind" so he must choose between his family's expectations and what his heart really wants.

== Cast ==
- Colm Meaney as Fintan McGuire
- Fred Willard as Peter Murphy
- Kevin Farley as Fred Finnegan
- Nicole Forester as Colleen
- Niki Spiridakos as Vanessa
- Sean Lackey as Tom Murphy
- Charlotte Bradley as Fiona McGuire
- Lynette Callaghan as Molly Sweeney
- Martin Maloney as Declan Sweeney
- Brian de Salvo as Hristos
- Spencer Jay Kim as Ricardo
- Maria Corell as Bernie
- Maryanne Nagel as Annie Murphy
- Cody Dove as Stephen

== Reception ==
The film received mixed reviews upon release.

Lee Hazell of VultureHound.cok felt that the low budget and film style lacked discipline and production quality. George Heymont of The Huffington Post felt it had strong comedic moments and was cleverly written. Drew Hunt of the Chicago Reader wrote: The cliché dialogue, stereotypical characters, and cheesy, G-rated humor belong in a sitcom.
