= 2gether (American TV series) =

American/Canadian sitcom

- Also known as: 2ge+her
- Genre: Sitcom
- Created by: Brian Gunn; Mark Gunn
- Developed by: Roger S.H. Schulman
- Starring: Evan Farmer; Noah Bastian; Kevin Farley; Alex Solowitz; Michael Cuccione
- Composers: Camara Kambon; Roger Neill
- Countries of origin: United States; Canada
- Original language: English
- No. of seasons: 2
- No. of episodes: 19 (1 unaired)

Production
- Production locations: Vancouver, British Columbia; Burnaby, British Columbia
- Running time: 30 minutes
- Production companies: Gunn & Gunn Productions; Alliance Atlantis

Original release
- Network: MTV
- Release: August 15, 2000 – March 19, 2001

2gether (stylized as 2ge+her: The Series) is a sitcom that aired on MTV from August 15, 2000 until March 19, 2001. The series was cancelled after two seasons due to the death of the youngest band member, Michael Cuccione, in early 2001.

== Synopsis ==
2gether began as a movie and spun-off into an MTV series about a faux boy band that parodied the popular boy bands of the 90s, such as The Backstreet Boys, NSYNC and New Kids on the Block.

== Cast ==
- Evan Farmer as Jerry O' Keefe – "The Heartthrob"
- Alex Solowitz as Mickey Parke – "The Bad Boy"
- Noah Bastian as Chad Linus – "The Shy One"
- Kevin Farley as Doug Linus – "The Older Brother"
- Michael Cuccione as Jason "Q.T." McKnight – "The Cute One"

== Episodes ==
=== Season 1 (2000) ===
No. overall	No. in season	Title	Directed by	Written by	Original release date
1	1	"Lorelei: Pilot"	Paul Lazarus	Brian Gunn & Mark Gunn	August 15, 2000
2	2	"Crying"	Robert Ginty	Roger S.H. Schulman	August 22, 2000
3	3	"Bunny"	Robert Ginty	Erica Rothschild	August 29, 2000
4	4	"Rage"	Paul Lazarus	Brian Gunn & Mark Gunn	September 5, 2000
5	5	"Solo"	Gilbert M. Shilton	Roger S.H. Schulman	September 12, 2000
6	6	"Hotties"	Gilbert M. Shilton	Roger S.H. Schulman	September 19, 2000
7	7	"Waxed"	Dan Ireland	Christy Callman	October 3, 2000
8	8	"Boss"	John Pozer	Michael Sperr & Celia Rumsey	October 10, 2000
9	9	"Dad"	Robert Ginty	Erica Rothschild	October 17, 2000
10	10	"Dead"	Robert Ginty	Sy Rosen	October 24, 2000
11	11	"Awesomeness"	Charles Wilkinson	Bill Canterbury	October 31, 2000
12	12	"Dumped"	Robert Ginty	Howard Meyers	November 14, 2000
13	13	"Forever I"	Mark Sobel	Brian Gunn, Mark Gunn	November 21, 2000

=== Season 2 (2001) ===
No. overall	No. in season	Title	Directed by	Written by	Original release date
14	1	"Pirates"	John Pozer	Bill Canterbury	February 19, 2001
15	2	"Lovechild"	Charles Wilkinson	Sy Rosen	February 26, 2001
16	3	"Jillie"	John Pozer	Chris Brown	March 5, 2001
17	4	"Lyrics"	George Mendeluk	Bill Canterbury	March 12, 2001
18	5	"Kiss"	Mark Gunn	Brian Gunn	March 19, 2001
19	6	"Fat"	John Pozer	Roger S.H. Schulman	unaired
