= Hollywood & Wine =

2010 film by Kevin Farley

- Directed by: Matt Berman; Kevin P. Farley
- Written by: Matt Berman; Jennifer Farley; John P. Farley; Kevin Farley
- Produced by: Henry Boger; Brian Hartman; Alexander Tabrizi; Mary Aloe
- Starring: Chris Kattan; Nicky Whelan; Chazz Palminteri; Norm Macdonald; Horatio Sanz; Kevin Farley; John Farley; Chris Parnell; Leslie Easterbrook; Jeremy London; Miguel A. Nunez Jr.; Vivica A. Fox; Pamela Anderson; David Spade
- Music by: Scott Glasgow
- Production companies: Free Fall Films; Trivision Pictures
- Distributed by: Green Apple Entertainment
- Release date: October 23, 2010 (Los Angeles)
- Country: United States
- Language: English
- Budget: $5 million
- Box office: $8 million

Hollywood & Wine is a 2010 American comedy film directed by Kevin P. Farley.

== Plot ==
Diane Blaine has the face of a movie star. Unfortunately, fallen star/tabloid queen Jamie Stephens already made it famous. Hollywood's constant rejections of Diane due to what she refers to as "TJS" ("Too Jamie Stephens") have made her bitter, frustrated, and whiny. Her co-worker/boyfriend Jack Sanders doesn't help matters. His idea of ambition is letting it ride. Now he's in major debt to a trigger-happy mobster who has a thing for Jamie Stephens. Jack's only way out is to convince Diane to be Jamie and wipe out the debt having one meal with a made man. It's literally the performance of her life. With Jack's on the line.

== Cast ==
- Nicky Whelan as Diane Blaine / Jamie Stephens
- Chris Kattan as Jack Sanders
- Pamela Anderson as Herself
- David Spade as Harvey Harrison
- Chazz Palminteri as Geno Scarpaci
- Norm Macdonald as Sid Blaustein
- Jeremy London as Jean-Luc Marceau
- Kevin Farley as Bruno
- John P. Farley as Joey
- Vivica A. Fox as Jackie Johnson
- Horatio Sanz as Tony
- Chris Parnell as Peter West
- Leslie Easterbrook as Hattie
- Miguel A. Nunez Jr. as "Hawk" Miller
