= Jillian Bach =

American actress

- Born: Jillian Rosenbach; April 27, 1973 (age 52); Palm Beach Gardens, Florida, U.S.
- Occupation: Actress
- Years active: 1998–2015

Jillian Bach (born April 27, 1973) is an American actress. She is best known for her role as Irene in the ABC sitcom Two Guys and a Girl. She was also series regular on the CBS sitcom Courting Alex.

She also guest starred in the television series Felicity, The X-Files, Party of Five, Gilmore Girls, Grey's Anatomy, The King of Queens, Law & Order, NCIS, Bones and Private Practice, as well as appearing recurringly on ER and The Mentalist.

She also co-starred in the films The Uninvited and Julie & Julia.

== Filmography ==
Film
Year	Title	Role	Notes
1999	American Pie	Bathroom Girl	
2004	Lucky	Delivery Girl	
2004	The Last Run	Felicia	
2008	The Uninvited	Trina	
2008	New York, I Love You	Mother 3	(uncredited)
2009	Julie & Julia	Annabelle	
2011	Shape	Claire	Short film

Television
Year	Title	Role	Notes
1998	USA High	Girl #1	Episode: "Lazz's High Noon"
1998	NewsRadio	Girl #2	Episode: "Security Door"
1998	Felicity	Alice	Episode: "Hot Objects"
1999	Zoe, Duncan, Jack and Jane	Cute Girl	Episode: "When Zoe Met Johnny"
1999	The X-Files	Maggie	Episode: "Milagro"
2000	Party of Five	Deborah	Episode: "Bad Behavior"
1999–2001	Two Guys and a Girl	Irene	Main role
2003	Still Standing	Stacy	Episode: "Still Christmas"
2004–2006	ER	Penny Nicholson	Recurring role, 5 episodes
2005	Gilmore Girls	Lacey	Episode: "We've Got Magic to Do"
2005	Yes, Dear	Tammy	Episode: "Jimmy from the Block"
2006	Courting Alex	Molly	Main role
2006	Grey's Anatomy	Gretchen	Episode: "Let the Angels Commit"
2007	Close to Home	Colleen Ames	Episode: "Internet Bride"
2007	The King of Queens	Sandy	Episode: "China Syndrome (Parts 1 & 2)"
2007	My Boys	Tina	Episode: "Douchebag in the City"
2008	Law & Order	Rebecca Moore	Episode: "Falling"
2008	Speedie Date	Amanda	TV series short
2010	Ghost Whisperer	Maggie	Episode: "Dead Air"
2010	NCIS	Emily Moss	Episode: "Guilty Pleasure"
2010	Bones	Ember	Episode: "The Witch in the Wardrobe"
2010	I'm in the Band	Iris	Episode: "What Happened?"
2010	Parenthood	Andie	Episode: "Put Yourself Out There"
2011–2012	The Mentalist	Sarah Harrigan	Recurring role, 6 episodes
2012	Private Practice	Debra Diamanti	Episode: "Aftershock"
2015	iZombie	Jane Bowman	Episode: "Dead Air"
