= Blonde and Blonder =

- Theatrical release poster
- Directed by: Dean Hamilton; Bob Clark (uncredited)
- Written by: Rolfe Kanefsky; Dean Hamilton; Gerry Anderson
- Produced by: Dean Hamilton; Kirk Shaw
- Starring: Pamela Anderson; Denise Richards; Emmanuelle Vaugier; Kevin Farley; John Farley; Byron Mann
- Cinematography: C. Kim Miles
- Edited by: Stan Cole
- Music by: Peter Allen
- Production companies: Insight Film Studios; Pneumatic Pictures; Canadian Global Media
- Distributed by: Rigel Entertainment; First Look Studios
- Release date: January 18, 2008 (United States)
- Running time: 94 minutes
- Country: Canada
- Language: English
- Budget: $8 million
- Box office: $780,000

Blonde and Blonder is a 2008 Canadian comedy film directed by Dean Hamilton and starring Pamela Anderson, Denise Richards, and Emmanuelle Vaugier. The film was released on January 18, 2008.

The title is a nod to the 1994 comedy Dumb and Dumber. Besides the similar title, both films have no relation to each other.

== Plot ==
Two dumb blondes, Dee Twiddle and Dawn St. Dom, meet each other for the first time at their first lesson in flight school and they like each other right away due to their numerous similarities. Dee is a professional dancer who has breast implants and a gassy pet turtle named Virgil. Dawn is a former secretary who has tried to be a dancer. After meeting with each other in flight school, Dawn takes off the training plane, believing that Dee is the teacher (and, unfortunately, vice-versa). Once they realized it’s both their first lesson, the girls panic and the plane crashes on a golf course. But both blondes survive the accident without injuries. The blondes quickly become best friends and they notice that they have been next-door neighbors for nearly a year.

Dee decides to help Dawn get a dancing gig at the Beaver Patch Lounge. Meanwhile, the Vancouver Italian Mafia decides to whack Lou Rimoli, a former mafia member and current informant, who is running the Beaver Patch Lounge. Rimoli is being protected by two agents Campbell and Gardenia. The Godfather of the mob sends two female assassins, Cat and Kit to whack Rimoli. The assassins succeed. However, Rimoli is murdered right before Dee and Dawn's audition. The mobsters, Leo and Swan, were supposed to monitor what was happening. After seeing Dee and Dawn run from the club, they mistake the blondes for being the infamous assassins Cat and Kit.

Consequently, Leo and Swan offer them $250,000 to "take out" Hang Wong, the head of the Triads in Niagara Falls, Ontario. Dee and Dawn agree, but they think that they have to take Wong on a date. Federal agents discover the plan to kill Wong and follow the blonde duo also thinking they are Cat and Kit. The Godfather sends Leo and Swan to follow the girls to make sure Wong gets whacked. Once the blonde duo arrive in Niagara Falls, they settle at a casino hotel and resort, which Mr. Wong owns. Cat and Kit also arrive there and find out that Dee and Dawn are pretending to be them and have been the hired assassins. They plan to get revenge for this double theft of reputation.

While Dawn is winning money at the casino, Dee meets Mr. Wong during his meeting with Leo and Swan. Dee tells Wong that Leo and Swan hired her to show him a good time. Federal agents spot Dee with Wong in the casino, and chase them. Wong decides to kidnap Dee and takes her to his yacht. Meanwhile, they are chased by the federal agents, Dawn, Cat and Kit. The federal agents and police take everyone into custody.

Back at the casino, the police arrest Kit and Cat, and also Wong for kidnapping Dee. Dawn and Dee kiss despite that Dawn finally finds her dream man Ken (who had joined her in the boat chase), and with the millions of dollars Dawn won at the casino, Dee and Dawn establish Dee and Dawn's Famous Turtle Sanctuary in the countryside where they only have one turtle but promise to have more soon.

== Cast ==
- Pamela Anderson as Dee Twiddle
- Denise Richards as Dawn St. Dom
- Emmanuelle Vaugier as Cat
- Meghan Ory as Kit
- Joey Aresco as Agent Campbell
- Garry Chalk as Agent Gardenia
- Jay Brazeau as Louie Ramoli
- Woody Jeffreys as Ken
- Kevin Farley as Leo
- John Farley as Swan
- Byron Mann as Mr. Wong
- Kyle Labine as Lieutenant Porter
- John Tench as Evangelos
- Alex Bruhanski as Godfather
- Phoenix Ly as One Eye

== See also ==
- List of Canadian films of 2008
