= Sports Bar (TV series) =

American sketch-comedy TV series (1997–1998)

- Genre: Improvisational comedy Sketch comedy
- Created by: Joe Keefe
- Written by: Scott Allman; Maria Corell; Carl Kozlowski; Soren McCarthy; Tami Sagher; Al Samuels
- Directed by: Tim Kazurinsky; Mick Napier
- Starring: Maria Corell; John Farley; Kevin P. Farley; Greg Mills; David Pompeii; Tami Sagher; Al Samuels; Rich Talarico
- Country of origin: United States
- Original language: English
- No. of seasons: 1

Production
- Executive producer: Joe Keefe
- Producers: Andrew Alexander; Darren Critz; Ed Menaker
- Cinematography: Michael Davis
- Camera setup: Multi-camera
- Running time: 30 minutes
- Production company: Gold Star Productions

Original release
- Network: Syndication
- Release: 1997 – 1998

Related
- Kwik Witz; My Talk Show; SCTV

Sports Bar is a sketch-comedy show that aired in first-run syndication from 1997 to 1998. The series featured members of the Second City improvisational comedy troupe out of Chicago. This was the first television series since the end of SCTV in 1984, where creative control has been so firmly in the hands of the troupe. The Sports Bar was taped at WTTW's Chicago Production Center, who was a part owner of the program.

== Format ==
The series follows the lives of the regulars at a sports bar, who serve as a leaping-off point for satirizing the world of sports, leisure and American culture as a whole. The TV sets in the bar allowed the show to offer up commercial parodies and snippets of newscasts.

== Cast ==
- Maria Corell ... Regular Performer
- John Farley ... Regular Performer
- Kevin P. Farley ... Regular Performer
- Scot Fedderly ... Patron
- Bruce Green ... Guest Performer
- Soren McCarthy ... Ensemble Cast (1998)
- Greg Mills ... Regular Performer (1997)
- Monte ... Patron
- David Pompeii ... Regular Performer
- Tami Sagher ... Regular Performer
- Al Samuels ... Regular Performer
- Rich Talarico ... Regular Performer
- Elvis Winterbottom ... Guest Performer (1998) (uncredited)

== See also ==
- List of fictional bars and pubs
