= The Uninvited (2008 film) =

- Film poster
- Directed by: Bob Badway
- Written by: Bob Badway
- Produced by: Michael Emanuel; Jasper Jan; Jim Stoddard
- Starring: Marguerite Moreau; Brittany Curran; Colin Hay
- Cinematography: Igor Meglic
- Edited by: Joaquin Montalvan
- Music by: Ken Mazur
- Production company: Canal Street Films
- Release date: 2008
- Running time: 97 minutes
- Country: United States
- Language: English

The Uninvited is a 2008 American horror thriller film directed and written by Bob Badway and produced by Michael Emanuel, Jasper Jan and Jim Stoddard. The film stars Marguerite Moreau, Brittany Curran and Colin Hay in a tale about a young woman's cured fear of space, relapsing in the return of her nightmarish past and the emergence of supernatural entities that come to haunt her remote house.

== Plot ==
A young, agoraphobic woman, Lee Ferris, lives in a remote house with her husband, Nick Ferris, a filmmaker who produces an award-winning documentary, Living in Fear, on her battle with a bizarre fear of space. Developed after seeing an apparition as a child, Lee had recently undergone psychotherapy from her psychiatrist, Dr. Schulman, to cure her condition that eventually relapses in the wake of her returning nightmarish past. Although the couple faces financial woes (and Lee has trouble finding a job), Nick pays his ex-production assistant, Helena, for her services. He then goes out for one whole day to perform a "job" he vows will change both of their lives, leaving his newest project to record onto a DVD, while Lee rests.

The house soon becomes haunted by supernatural forces, as Lee is tormented by nightmares and learns that thirty years ago, a group of seven people inexplicably died in the house she lives, though Nick withheld this information from her upon moving in. She also discovers Nick's new project explores the spiritual world after watching the recorded video he left behind. She contacts her friend, Trina, who helps her over the phone to deal with her fear and panic attacks as it worsens. Using techniques Dr. Schulman taught her, Lee stays close to walls and surfaces, only moving around in vacant space with her eyes closed.

Later that night, a thunderstorm commences, and Lee sees a man, Helmut, in her driveway who is struck by lightning. He supernaturally revives as a zombie just as Lee blindly runs out of the house in fright. Zombie Helmut pursues her and takes her back into the house before she locks him out. Lee finds a bag enclosed with bloodstained sheets in the basement. Helena breaks into the house armed with a gun, revealing it's hers. She tells Lee the truth that Nick hid from her, admitting she was suicidal and needy for cash, so in desperation, she made a deal to hand over the care of her baby to Nick, both for money and also to prevent children's aid from taking her baby.

Wanting her baby back, Helena awaits Nick's arrival. Zombie Helmut breaks in and Helena shoots him, though she becomes mortally injured and pleads with Lee to save her baby before she dies. Eventually, Lee becomes a psychological survivalist, overcoming her deepest fears. During the search for the baby, it's revealed the baby was left in the house. Nick concedes to Lee he is working for certain "forces" and plans to offer the baby up for a sacrificial ritual to be performed in their haunted house in exchange for the resolution of their financial problems. Lee is against it and prepares to shoot him with the gun, but Nick threatens to harm the child. Zombie Helmut appears and kills Nick to take the baby. Lee shoots him, however. The next day, Lee departs the house with the baby, leaving the demonic spirits behind. As she is walking down a road, zombie Helena watches her child being carried away.

== Cast ==
- Marguerite Moreau as Lee
- Brittany Curran as Helena
- Colin Hay as Nick
- Donna W. Scott as Dr. Schulman
- Jillian Bach as Trina
- Michael Emanuel as Father Mitello
- Zia Harris as Helmut
- Phalana Tiller as Palmist
- Linda Larson as Bloody Old Woman
- Marion Kelly as Old Woman

== Reception ==
Gordon Sullivan of DVD Verdict reviewed the film, claiming "a strong visual sense and a good central performance can't overcome the fact that The Uninvited doesn't have a coherent story." He does, however, commend the director for effectively setting up the look of the film to suggest both openness and claustrophobia and for using the documentary format to introduce the illness of the main character which he calls "bold" and "brilliant". All in all, Gordon believes it "shows tremendous potential, but doesn't quite hang together as an effective horror film."
