= Courting Alex =

2006 American TV series

- Genre: Sitcom
- Based on: According to Bex by Fred Barron
- Developed by: Rob Hanning
- Starring: Jenna Elfman; Josh Randall; Hugh Bonneville; Dabney Coleman; Jillian Bach; Josh Stamberg
- Composer: Justin Stanley
- Country of origin: United States
- Original language: English
- No. of seasons: 1
- No. of episodes: 12 (4 unaired)

Production
- Executive producer: Rob Hanning
- Producers: Faye Oshima Belyeu; Jenna Elfman
- Camera setup: Multi-camera
- Production companies: April Fools Productions; Paramount Television; Touchstone Television

Original release
- Network: CBS
- Release: January 23 – March 29, 2006

Courting Alex is an American sitcom that aired on CBS from January 23 to March 29, 2006. It was a starring vehicle for Jenna Elfman of Dharma & Greg fame. The series was based on the British sitcom According to Bex.

== Premise ==
Elfman portrays Alex Rose, a successful, single attorney who works with her father Bill at his law firm. Alex struggles with dating while looking for love in a big city. Her father wants her to settle down with her coworker Stephen, a star lawyer at the firm who is smitten with her. She prefers Scott, the tavern owner she meets in the first episode, of whom her father doesn't approve. Alex relies on the advice of her assistant Molly, and British neighbor Julian.

== Cast ==
- Jenna Elfman as Alex Rose
- Dabney Coleman as Bill Rose
- Hugh Bonneville as Julian
- Josh Randall as Scott
- Josh Stamberg as Stephen
- Jillian Bach as Molly

Comedian Wayne Federman had a recurring role as office sycophant, Johnson.

== Production and development ==
The show's working titles were Everything I Know about Men and The Jenna Elfman Show. The stage for the office where Alex works is a redressed version of the Winfred-Louder Department Store set used by The Drew Carey Show. The show's theme song was performed by Nikka Costa.

Despite starting off with impressive numbers, ratings for Courting Alex fell hard after the show was moved to Wednesday nights. The show was not picked up for a second season in May 2006 when CBS canceled Courting Alex and fellow freshman series Out of Practice.

== Episodes ==
No.	Title	Directed by	Written by	Original release date	Prod. code	Viewers (millions)
0	"Everything I Know About Men"	N/A	N/A	Unaired	100	N/A
1	"A Tale of Two Kisses"	Pamela Fryman	Rob Hanning	January 23, 2006	101	14.90
2	"Is She Really Going Out With Him?"	Mark Cendrowski	Seth Kurland	January 30, 2006	102	13.27
3	"Girlfriend"	Mark Cendrowski	Eileen Conn	February 6, 2006	104	12.99
4	"New Best Friend"	Asaad Kelada	Steve Armogida & Jim Armogida	February 13, 2006	105	11.11
5	"The Fix-Up"	Asaad Kelada	John Peaslee & Judd Pillot	February 27, 2006	108	13.78
6	"Birthday"	Mark Cendrowski	Justin Spitzer	March 6, 2006	103	13.77
7	"The Mattress"	Leonard R. Garner Jr.	Amy Welsh	March 22, 2006	106	6.28
8	"Big Client"	Mark Cendrowski	Aury Wallington	March 29, 2006	107	5.97
9	"The Perfect Couple"	Terry Hughes	Jeremiah Leibowitz	Unaired	109	N/A
10	"You Compete Me"	Asaad Kelada	Jim Armogida & Steve Armogida & Seth Kurland	Unaired	110	N/A
11	"Alex Looks Out for Stephen"	Mark Cendrowski	John Peaslee & Judd Pillot	Unaired	111	N/A
12	"A Moving Story"	Mark Cendrowski	Nancy Cohen	Unaired	112	N/A

== Broadcast ==
In the UK, Courting Alex aired on Paramount Comedy 1, premiering on May 28, 2007. In Australia, Courting Alex is aired on Channel Ten.

== Ratings ==
Based on the average total viewers per episode of Courting Alex on CBS:

Season	TV Season	Timeslot (EDT)	Series Premiere	Series Finale	Rank	Viewers (in millions)	18-49 Rating/Share (rank)
1	2005–06	Monday 9:30 P.M. (January 23, 2006 – March 6, 2006); Wednesday 8:00 P.M. (March 22, 2006 – March 29, 2006)	January 23, 2006	March 29, 2006	#35	11.2	3.7/8 (#39)

Despite a decent respectable rating average that passed the 10 million meter mark the show was not renewed for a second season and was canceled mid-way into the season.
