= Dog Gone (2008 film) =

- DVD cover
- Directed by: Mark Stouffer
- Written by: Mark Stouffer; Dennis S. Johnson
- Produced by: Mark Stouffer; Wendy Winks; Rich Cowan
- Starring: Luke Benward; French Stewart; Brittany Curran; Kevin Farley
- Cinematography: Tom Carmada
- Edited by: Jeff Martin
- Music by: Andrew Gross
- Distributed by: Screen Media Films
- Release date: October 7, 2008
- Running time: 108 minutes
- Country: United States
- Language: English

Dog Gone (also known as Diamond Dog Caper) is a 2008 American comedy film directed by Mark Stouffer and starring Luke Benward, French Stewart, Brittany Curran, and Kevin Farley. The film revolves around a young boy who rescues and hides a Golden Retriever carrying a fortune in stolen diamonds from a band of thugs.

== Plot ==
When Owen (Luke Benward) and his distracted older sister, Lilly (Brittany Curran), are alone and their parents are away, Owen delivers the paper while being bullied by a school bully named Dexter and his gang (who harass Owen by throwing his bike, newspapers and pants off a bridge), and spends afternoons in a forest hideaway making inventions and spinning tall tales about a "Mad Man of the Mountain" in which he claims to be a scary man who used to work in a circus freak show but later moved to live in the mountains to be free. He encounters three thugs named Blackie (French Stewart), Bud (Kevin Farley) and Arty (Kelly Perine) who have a mistreated dog and Owen's life changes.

Unbeknownst to Owen, the thugs have previously committed a diamond heist and supposedly hid the stolen diamonds on the dog's collar. With Owen's help, the dog escapes from the thugs and Owen bonds with the Golden Retriever whom he names Diamond. When he reads a newspaper account about the thugs' diamond heist, he soon realizes about how they are the chief suspects and how they hid the diamonds on Diamond.

He takes her to the police, but the police believe that the story is not true, thinking that Owen might be telling stories about the "Mad Man" making friends with a bigfoot. So Owen decides to look after Diamond. He hides her at his forest hideaway and visits her often to feed her and comfort her. Meanwhile, the thugs are searching for Owen and Diamond. They attempt to confront him personally by showing up at his house after getting the location from Dexter. Owen escapes into the woods but the thugs catch up with him just as Diamond escapes. As the thugs explore the woods he warns them about the "Mad Man" and shows them some of the inventions he built for the "Mad Man". Owen then escapes the thugs and rigs his hideaway in the forest with booby traps for them. As he heads back to his house, he is caught by the thugs again, but Owen manages to escape from their grasp. He runs into the woods with Diamond and the thugs give chase. They trace Owen to his hideaway and search the whole area from him, but end up setting off Owen's booby traps one by one. At one point, Blackie finally catches Owen.

The thugs tie Owen to a chair at the hideaway, while the thugs inspect Diamond for the diamonds. Blackie notices a band-aid on Diamond's stomach that Owen previously put on her and suspects Owen did something to Diamond. When Blackie orders Owen to show him where he hid the diamonds, he leads them to a canoe trailer, which belongs to the "Mad Man" and claims he hid them in it. Bud and Arty jump into the canoe to find the diamonds and become glued to their seats of the canoe, as part of Owen's booby traps. But the two find the collar in the canoe and toss him to Blackie, but he becomes annoyed. He tells Owen he actually hid the stolen diamonds in Diamond's stomach and that the collar had fake diamonds on it so they could celebrate the diamond heist. Diamond becomes sick when the diamonds in her stomach fall down to her intestines. Owen lets Diamond escape from Blackie, leaving him alone to fight for himself. Before Blackie gets a chance to hurt Owen, he ends up being thrown into the canoe with Bud and Arty by the "Mad Man of the Mountain" and the thugs roll down the hill in the trailer into town. Along the way, they encounter Dexter riding his bike and ends up landing in a nearby trash bin where he is presumably thrown into a garbage truck. The thugs eventually stop at a Mexican food restaurant. But they soon find themselves next to some policemen, who see the thugs whom they recognize from the diamond heist and arrest them.

With help from the "Mad Man of the Mountain," Owen comes home with Diamond sick, and he asks his sister for help. Owen and his parents are at the vet to comfort Diamond, who just had the stolen diamonds removed from her. Owen learns the truth about the "Mad Man of the Mountain" from the police chief. The "Mad Man of the Mountain" wasn't any madman at all. Nor did he escape from any circus. His name was Carl Westmeister, who had been living up in the woods for years ever since his wife died from a car crash and was badly burned trying to save her. Owen is interested in keeping Diamond, but due to his sister's extreme allergy to dogs, Owen then plans to give Diamond to the "Mad Man" instead. The next day, Owen goes up the mountain and gives Diamond to the man, who thanks Owen from afar. The movie ends with Owen and his girlfriend watching fireworks and the two kiss. The thugs and the "Mad Man" watch the fireworks as well.

== Cast ==
- Luke Benward as Owen
- French Stewart as Blackie
- Brittany Curran as Lilly
- Kevin Farley as Bud
- John P. Farley as Dad
- Kenda Benward as Mom
- Loren Stouffer as Stand In for Luke Benward and Extra
- Cameron Monaghan as Dexter
- Kelly Perine as Arty
- Denyse Tontz as Meagan Todd
- Garrett Morris as Police Chief

== Production ==
Dog Gone is the only film shot in Cheney, Washington, a small town located 16 miles southeast of Spokane. Filming took place there as well as rural areas around the Spokane metropolitan area between June and September 2007.

== Release ==
Dog Gone was never released theatrically, but was released on DVD by Screen Media Films and Universal Studios on October 7, 2008.
