= The Adventures of Food Boy =

- Promotional release poster
- Directed by: Dane Cannon
- Written by: Marc Mangum
- Produced by: Marc Mangum; Sam Mangum; Melissa Brady
- Starring: Lucas Grabeel; Brittany Curran; Ryne Sanborn; Noah Bastian; Joyce Cohen
- Cinematography: Ryan Cannon
- Edited by: Sam Mangum
- Music by: Bill Wandel
- Distributed by: Cold Spark Films
- Release date: August 22, 2008
- Running time: 90 minutes
- Country: United States
- Language: English

The Adventures of Food Boy is a 2008 independent comedy film directed by Dane Cannon. It is based on the 2007 short film Owen Seabrook: Food Boy. It stars Lucas Grabeel in his first lead role as Ezra Chase, who becomes a superhero known as "Food Boy". Brittany Curran plays the lead female role of Shelby.

The film was filmed in Utah at Timpview High School during fall 2007. An early teaser trailer of The Adventures of Food Boy was posted on the Internet in November 2007.

The Adventures of Food Boy premiered at the Newport Beach Film Festival in April 2008 where it won the award for "Best Family Film". It saw a limited theatrical release in the United States on August 22, 2008, and saw a DVD release on October 7, 2008.

== Plot ==
The Adventures of Food Boy takes a different approach to the superhero genre. The story centers around a teenage boy who discovers he has the superpower to generate food out of his hands.

Ezra Chase (Lucas Grabeel) is a top high school student who is determined to make his life extraordinary. He is usually challenged into eating disgusting things and manages to eat them without hassle. However, his goals get more complicated when food spontaneously begins shooting from his hands at inconvenient times. Chaos usually ensues.

After discovering that he has this "gift" (which only a few people possess), Ezra starts to use it to improve his status at school. Ezra's friends Shelby (Brittany Curran), Joel (Kunal Sharma) and Dylan (Jeff Braine) also start to get more popular. But as this new superpower begins to take over his life, Ezra has to learn how best to use it. He eventually is forced to decide if he agrees with his grandmother (Joyce Cohen) in saying, "Not all superheroes fight crime".

== Cast ==
- Lucas Grabeel as Ezra Chase
- Brittany Curran as Shelby
- Ryne Sanborn as Mike
- Kunal Sharma as Joel
- Jeff Braine as Dylan
- Noah Bastian as Garrett
- Joyce Cohen as Grandma
- Craig Everett as Montagu
- McCall Clark as Justine
- Brooklyn McKnight as Elle
- Bailey McKnight as Julie
- Chris Miller as the Janitor
