= Making the Video =

American television series

- Country of origin: United States
- No. of seasons: 14
- No. of episodes: approx. 133

Production
- Running time: 30 minutes

Original release
- Network: MTV
- Release: June 28, 1999 – 2010

Making the Video is an MTV show consisting of half-hour episodes chronicling the process of filming various music videos. Usually the director outlines the concept of the video (or treatment) and the show often includes light-hearted and humorous moments. It always concludes with a premiere of the finished video. The show premiered on June 28, 1999, and ended in 2010.

MTV2 aired a similar show entitled [Name of Band/Artist] Makes a Video that featured artists such as 50 Cent, Fall Out Boy, Dashboard Confessional, Evanescence, and Mos Def among others.

== Season 1 ==
- 98 Degrees – "I Do (Cherish You)" (1999)
- Britney Spears – "(You Drive Me) Crazy (The Stop Remix!)" (1999)
- LL Cool J – "Deepest Bluest (Shark's Fin)" (1999)
- Jordan Knight – "I Could Never Take the Place of Your Man" (1999)
- Jewel – "Jupiter (Swallow the Moon)" (1999)
- Jay-Z – "Girl's Best Friend" (1999)
- Mariah Carey featuring Jay-Z – "Heartbreaker" (1999)
- Jennifer Lopez – "Waiting for Tonight" (1999)
- Chris Cornell – "Can't Change Me" (1999)
- Puff Daddy featuring R. Kelly – "Satisfy You" (1999)
- Blink-182 – "All the Small Things" (1999)
- The Offspring – "She's Got Issues" (1999)
- Red Hot Chili Peppers – "Around the World" (1999)
- Enrique Iglesias – "Rhythm Divine" (1999)
- Garbage – "The World is Not Enough" (1999)
- Sugar Ray – "Falls Apart" (1999)
- Whitney Houston – "I Learned from the Best" (1999)
- R.E.M. – "The Great Beyond" (1999)

== Season 2 ==
- Dr. Dre featuring Eminem & Hittman – "Forgot About Dre" (2000)
- *NSYNC – "Bye Bye Bye" (2000)
- Mandy Moore – "Walk Me Home" (2000)
- No Doubt – "Ex-Girlfriend" (2000)
- Jessica Simpson featuring Nick Lachey – "Where You Are" (2000)
- Beck – "Mixed Bizness" (2000)
- Sisqó – "Thong Song" (2000)
- Hanson – "This Time Around" (2000)
- Jay-Z featuring UGK – "Big Pimpin'" (2000)
- Da Brat featuring Tyrese – "What'Chu Like" (2000)
- Stone Temple Pilots – "Sour Girl" (2000)
- Christina Aguilera – "I Turn to You" (2000)
- Britney Spears – "Oops!...I Did It Again" (2000)
- Kid Rock – "American Bad Ass" (2000)
- Eminem – "The Real Slim Shady" (2000)
- Foo Fighters – "Breakout" (2000)
- Metallica – "I Disappear" (2000)
- *NSYNC – "It's Gonna Be Me" (2000)

== Season 3 ==
- Janet Jackson – "Doesn't Really Matter" (2000)
- LL Cool J – "Imagine That" (2000)
- Britney Spears – "Lucky" (2000)
- Busta Rhymes – "Fire" (2000)
- Big Tymers – "#1 Stunna" (2000)
- 98 Degrees – "Give Me Just One Night (Una Noche)" (2000)
- Christina Aguilera – "Come on Over Baby (All I Want Is You)" (2000)
- 2gether – "The Hardest Part of Breaking Up (Is Getting Back Your Stuff)" (2000)
- Lenny Kravitz – "Again" (2000)
- Destiny's Child – "Independent Women, Part 1" (2000)
- Ricky Martin – "She Bangs" (2000)
- Backstreet Boys – "Shape of My Heart" (2000)
- Blink-182 – "Man Overboard" (2000)
- OutKast – "Ms. Jackson" (2000)
- Britney Spears – "Stronger" (2000)
- BBMak – "Still on Your Side" (2000)
- Jennifer Lopez – "Love Don't Cost a Thing" (2000)
- Lucy Pearl featuring Snoop Dogg & Q-Tip – "You" (2000)

== Season 4 ==
- Ricky Martin featuring Christina Aguilera – "Nobody Wants to Be Lonely" (2001)
- Snoop Dogg – "Lay Low" (2001)
- Eve – "Who's That Girl?" (2001)
- The Jackson 5 – "La-La Means I Love You (snippet)" – with a cameo appearance by Rob Thomas from Matchbox Twenty (2001)
- Aerosmith – "Jaded" (2001)
- Matchbox Twenty – "Mad Season" (2001)
- Destiny's Child – "Survivor" (2001)
- Jay-Z featuring R. Kelly – "Guilty Until Proven Innocent"/"Fiesta" (2001)
- Dream – "This Is Me"/Tyrese – "I Like Them Girls" (2001)

== Season 5 ==
- Christina Aguilera, Lil' Kim, Mýa, & Pink – "Lady Marmalade" (2001)
- Baha Men – "Best Years of Our Lives" (2001)
- U2 – "Elevation" (2001)
- *NSYNC – "Pop" (2001)
- Destiny's Child – "Bootylicious" (2001)
- Sisqo – "Can I Live" (2001)
- Jennifer Lopez featuring Ja Rule – "I'm Real (Murder Remix)" (2001)
- Ludacris featuring Nate Dogg – "Area Codes" (2001)

== Season 6 ==
- Britney Spears – "I'm a Slave 4 U" (2001)
- On the Line All-Stars – "On the Line" (2001)
- P. Diddy – "Diddy" (2001)
- Janet Jackson – "Son of a Gun (I Betcha Think This Song Is about You)" (2001)
- P!nk – "Get the Party Started" (2001)

== Season 7 ==
- No Doubt – "Hey Baby" (2001)
- Ja Rule featuring Ashanti – "Always on Time" (2001)
- Creed – "My Sacrifice" (2001)
- Kid Rock – "Forever" (2001)
- Marilyn Manson – "Tainted Love" (2001)

== Season 8 ==
- Nick Cannon, Lil' Romeo, & 3LW – "Parents Just Don't Understand" (2001)
- Britney Spears – "I'm Not a Girl, Not Yet a Woman" (2001)
- Foo Fighters – "The One" (2001)
- Enrique Iglesias – "Escape" (2002)
- Brandy – "What About Us?" (2002)
- Shakira – "Underneath Your Clothes" (2002)
- P!nk – "Don't Let Me Get Me" (2002)
- Usher featuring Ludacris – "U Don't Have to Call" (2002)
- Godsmack – "I Stand Alone" (2002)
- No Doubt – "Hella Good" (2002)

== Season 9 ==
- Sum 41 – "It's What We're All About" (2002)
- Puddle of Mudd – "Drift & Die" (2002)
- P.O.D. – "Boom" (2002)
- Eminem – "Without Me" (2002)
- P. Diddy featuring Loon, Ginuwine & Mario Winans – "I Need a Girl Pt. 2" (2002)
- Jennifer Lopez featuring Nas – "I'm Gonna Be Alright" (2002)
- Papa Roach – "She Loves Me Not" (2002)
- R. Kelly – "Ignition Remix" (2002)
- Nelly – "Hot In Herre" (2002)
- Will Smith – "Nod Ya Head" (2002)
- Beyoncé – "Work It Out" (2002)
- Kelly Osbourne – "Papa Don't Preach" (2002)
- Eve featuring Alicia Keys – "Gangsta Lovin'" (2002)
- Jennifer Love Hewitt – "BareNaked" (2002)
- Shakira – "Objection (Tango)" (2002)
- Michelle Branch – "Goodbye to You" (2002)
- Jimmy Fallon – "Idiot Boyfriend" (2002)
- Lil' Bow Wow, Lil Wayne, Lil' Zane, & Sammie – "Hardball" (2002)
- Avril Lavigne – "Sk8er Boi" (2002)
- Justin Timberlake – "Like I Love You" (2002)
- Nick Carter – "Help Me" (2002)
- Kelly Clarkson – "Before Your Love" (2002)
- Christina Aguilera featuring Redman – "Dirrty" (2002)
- Madonna – "Die Another Day" (2002)
- Missy Elliott – "Work It" (2002)
- Jennifer Lopez – "Jenny from the Block" (2002)

== Season 10 ==
- Good Charlotte – "The Anthem" (2003)
- Mariah Carey featuring Cam'ron – "Boy (I Need You)" (2003)
- DMX – "X Gon' Give It to Ya" (2003)
- Justin Timberlake – "Rock Your Body" (2003)
- Linkin Park – "Somewhere I Belong" (2003)
- Avril Lavigne – "Losing Grip" (2003)
- Jennifer Lopez – "I'm Glad" (2003)
- Christina Aguilera – "Fighter" (2003)
- Ludacris – "Act a Fool" (2003)
- Pink – "Feel Good Time" (2003)
- Beyoncé featuring Jay-Z – "Crazy in Love" (2003)
- Mýa – "My Love Is Like...Wo!" (2003)
- Ruben Studdard – "Flying Without Wings" (2003)
- Madonna – "Hollywood" (2003)
- Nelly featuring Murphy Lee & P. Diddy – "Shake Ya Tailfeather" (2003)
- Jessica Simpson – "Sweetest Sin"/ Nick Lachey – "Shut Up"
- Mary J. Blige – "Love @ 1st Sight" (2003)
- Hilary Duff – "So Yesterday" (2003)
- Beyoncé, Missy Elliott, MC Lyte & Free – "Fighting Temptation"
- Da Band – "Bad Boy This, Bad Boy That" (2003)
- Pink – "Trouble" (2003)
- Limp Bizkit – "Behind Blue Eyes" (2003)
- Britney Spears featuring Madonna – "Me Against the Music" (2003)
- Blink-182 – "Feeling This" (2003)
- Mary J. Blige featuring Eve – "Not Today" (2003)
- Triumph the Insult Comic Dog – "I Keed" (2003)
- Puddle of Mudd – "Away from Me" (2003)

== Season 11 ==
- Hilary Duff – "Come Clean" (2004)
- Chingy featuring Jason Weaver – "One Call Away" (2004)
- Britney Spears – "Toxic" (2004)
- D12 – "My Band" (2004)
- Jessica Simpson – "Take My Breath Away" (2004)
- Jay-Z – "99 Problems" (2004)
- Brandy featuring Kanye West – "Talk About Our Love" (2004)
- Yellowcard – "Only One" (2004)
- Hilary Duff & Haylie Duff – "Our Lips Are Sealed" (2004)
- Usher – "Confessions Part II" (2004)
- Mase – "Welcome Back" (2004)
- Nelly – "Flap Your Wings"/Nelly featuring Jaheim – "My Place" (2004)
- Green Day – "American Idiot" (2004)
- Good Charlotte – "Predictable" (2004)
- Ja Rule featuring R. Kelly & Ashanti – "Wonderful" (2004)
- Xzibit – "Hey Now (Mean Muggin)" (2004)
- Eminem – "Just Lose It" (2004)
- Lindsay Lohan – "Rumors" (2004)
- Nelly featuring Christina Aguilera – "Tilt Ya Head Back" (2004)
- Gwen Stefani – "What You Waiting For?" (2004)
- Ashlee Simpson – "La La" (2004)
- Jennifer Lopez – "Get Right" (2005)
- Twista featuring Faith Evans – "Hope" (2005)
- Snoop Dogg – "Let's Get Blown" (2005)

== Season 12 ==
- 50 Cent featuring Olivia – "Candy Shop" (2005)
- Eminem – "Ass Like That" (2005)
- Mariah Carey – "It's Like That" (2005)
- Snoop Dogg, Charlie Wilson & Justin Timberlake – "Signs" (2005)
- Nelly – "Errtime" (2005)
- Kelly Osbourne – "One Word" (2005)
- Shakira featuring Alejandro Sanz – "La Tortura" (2005)
- The Game – "Dreams" (2005)
- Ludacris featuring Bobby Valentino – "Pimpin' All Over the World" (2005)
- Foo Fighters – "Best of You" (2005)
- Jessica Simpson – "These Boots Are Made for Walkin'" (2005)
- Ashlee Simpson – "Boyfriend" (2005)
- 50 Cent – "Window Shopper" (2005)
- Lindsay Lohan – "Confessions of a Broken Heart (Daughter to Father)" (2005)
- Shakira – "Don't Bother" (2005)
- Jamie Foxx – "Unpredictable" (2005)
- KoЯn – "Twisted Transistor" (2005)
- Kanye West featuring Adam Levine – "Heard 'Em Say" (2005)
- Beyoncé featuring Slim Thug – "Check On It" (2005)

== Season 13 ==
- The Notorious B.I.G. – "Spit Your Game" featuring Twista, Krayzie Bone, and 8Ball & MJG (2006)
- Daddy Yankee – "Gangsta Zone" (2006)
- Fall Out Boy – "A Little Less Sixteen Candles, A Little More "Touch Me"" (2006)
- Nick Lachey – "What's Left of Me" (2006)
- T.I. – "Why You Wanna" (2006)
- Ashlee Simpson – "Invisible" (2006)
- Christina Aguilera – "Ain't No Other Man" (2006)
- Jessica Simpson – "A Public Affair" (2006)
- Justin Timberlake – "SexyBack" (2006)
- Janet Jackson featuring Nelly – "Call on Me" (2006)
- Danity Kane – "Show Stopper" (2006)
- Ludacris featuring Pharrell – "Money Maker" (2006)
- Chris Cornell – "You Know My Name" (2006)
- Diddy – "Tell Me" featuring Christina Aguilera (2006)
- Gwen Stefani – "Wind It Up" (2006)
- Beyoncé – "Listen" (2006)

== Season 14 ==
- Nelly Furtado – "Maneater" (2007)
- Jennifer Lopez – "Que Hiciste" (2007)
- Natasha Bedingfield – "I Wanna Have Your Babies" (2007)
- Rihanna – "Shut Up and Drive" (2007)
- Foo Fighters – "The Pretender" (2007)
- Avril Lavigne – "Hot" (2007)
- Mariah Carey – "Touch My Body" (2008)
- Usher – "Love in This Club" (2008)
- Bon Jovi – "Whole Lot Of Leavin'" (2008)
- Natasha Bedingfield – "Pocketful of Sunshine" (2008)
- Lily Allen – "The Fear" (2009)
- Ashley Tisdale – "It's Alright, It's OK" (2009)
- Katy Perry, Snoop Dogg – "California Gurls" (2010)

== ...Makes a Video episodes ==
=== 2004 ===
- Akon – "Ghetto" (2004)
- Kanye West – "All Falls Down" (2004)
- Lil' Jon & The Eastside Boyz featuring Ice Cube – "Roll Call" (2004/early 2005)
- Linkin Park – "Breaking the Habit" (2004)
- Mobb Deep – "Got It Twisted" (2004)
- N.O.R.E. – "Oye Mi Canto"

=== 2005 ===
- 50 Cent featuring Mobb Deep – "Outta Control (Remix)" (2005)
- Boyz n da Hood – "Felonies" (2005)
- Cassidy – "I'm a Hustla" (2005)
- Ciara – "Oh" featuring Ludacris
- Common – "The Corner"
- Common – "Testify"
- Daddy Yankee – "Rompe"
- Eminem – "Ass Like That" (entitled "Eminem's Making the Ass" rather than "Eminem Makes a Video", but is considered a ...Makes a Video episode)
- Green Day – "Boulevard of Broken Dreams"
- Green Day – "Wake Me Up When September Ends"
- J-Kwon featuring Petey Pablo – "Get XXX'd" (2005)
- Jim Jones featuring P. Diddy, Jha Jha & Paul Wall – "What You Been Drankin' On" (2005)
- Juelz Santana – "Oh Yes"/"Clockwork"
- Lil Wayne – "Fireman" (2005)
- Ludacris featuring Field Mob – "Georgia" (2005)
- Memphis Bleek – "Like That"
- Mike Jones "Back Then" (2005)
- Mike Jones "Flossin'"/"Screw Dat" (2005)
- Mobb Deep featuring 50 Cent – "Have a Party" (2005)
- Paul Wall – "Sittin' Sidewayz" (2005)
- R. Kelly – "Playa's Only" featuring The Game (2005)
- R. Kelly – "Trapped in the Closet (Chapter 6)"
- T.I. – "ASAP/Motivation" (2005)
- Twista featuring Pitbull – "Hit the Floor" (2005)
- Ying Yang Twins – "Wait (The Whisper Song)" (2005)
- Ying Yang Twins – "Shake" featuring Pitbull
- Young Jeezy – "Trapstar"/"Go Crazy" (2005)

=== 2006 ===
- 50 Cent featuring Olivia – "Best Friend (Remix)" (2006)
- Cam'ron – "Touch It or Not"/"Wet Wipes" (2006)
- Dem Franchize Boyz – "Ridin' Rims" (2006)
- DJ Khaled – "Grammy Family" featuring Kanye West, Consequence, and John Legend
- DJ Khaled – "Holla At Me" featuring Lil Wayne, Paul Wall, Fat Joe, Rick Ross and Pitbull (2006)
- E-40 – "Tell Me When to Go" (2006)
- The Game – Let's Ride (2006)
- Ghostface Killah featuring Ne-Yo – "Back Like That" (2006)
- Ice Cube – "Go to Church" featuring Snoop Dogg and Lil' Jon (2006)
- Jim Jones – "We Fly High"
- Juvenile featuring Mike Jones, Paul Wall, Skip and Wacko – "Way I Be Leanin'"
- Lil' Jon featuring E-40 and Sean Paul – "Snap Ya Fingers" (2006)
- Lil' Scrappy featuring Young Buck – "Money in the Bank" (2006)
- Lil Wayne featuring Robin Thicke – "Shooter" (2006)
- Lupe Fiasco – "I Gotcha" (2006)
- Sleepy Brown featuring Pharrell & Big Boi – "Margarita" (2006)
- Snoop Dogg featuring R. Kelly – "That's That"
- T.I. featuring UGK – "Front Back"
- Three 6 Mafia – "Poppin' My Collar" (2006)
- Xzibit – "Concentrate"
- Yung Joc – "I Know You See It"/"Dope Boy Magic" (2006)
