= 2gether (band) =

American fictional boy band

- Alex Solowitz as Mickey Parke, Kevin Farley as Doug Linus, Evan Farmer as Jerry O'Keefe, Michael Cuccione as Jason "Q.T." McKnight, and Noah Bastian as Chad Linus

Background information
- Genres: Pop, dance-pop, teen pop
- Years active: 1999–2001
- Label: TVT
- Past members: Evan Farmer; Noah Bastian; Kevin Farley; Alex Solowitz; Michael Cuccione

2gether (usually stylized as 2ge+her, 2Ge+Her or 2GE+HER; pronounced "Together") was a fictional American boy band whose composition, songs, and formation story are a satirical approach to the boy band fad trend of the late 1990s and early 2000s such as New Kids on the Block, 'N Sync and Backstreet Boys. They were part of a self-titled MTV TV movie and spin-off television series.

The band, TV movie, and TV series were created by writers Brian Gunn and Mark Gunn (two cousins), who also wrote many of their songs. The band ended after member Michael Cuccione died of respiratory failure, stemming from a long struggle with Hodgkin lymphoma.

== Members ==
Each member was "drafted" into the band to fill a particular niche or market to a particular group.

- Jerry O'Keefe – "The Heartthrob" (Evan Farmer)
- Chad Linus – "The Shy One" (Noah Bastian)
- Jason "Q.T." McKnight – "The Cute One" (Michael Cuccione)
- Doug Linus – "The Older Brother" (Kevin Farley)
- Mickey Parke – "The Bad Boy" (Alex Solowitz)

Their manager is Bob Buss (Alan Blumenfeld).

== History ==
In the movie, the band had a breakout single, "U + Me = Us (Calculus)," which they followed up with "Say It (Don't Spray It)". A soundtrack was released in real life, which also included songs from other fictional bands, such as Whoa and Unity. The actors who played the characters did the vocals for their performances. They opened several shows for Britney Spears' 2000 summer tour, always appearing in character. Their sophomore record, though its music was used throughout the TV series, was full-length and solely performed by 2ge+her. Like the soundtrack, the music was comedic and satirical of pop song conventions. The single "The Hardest Part of Breaking Up (Is Getting Back Your Stuff)" was released before the album and charted at 87 on The Billboard Hot 100 and spent several days on MTV's Total Request Live. "Awesum Luvr" was also released, but failed to chart.

In January 2001, Michael Cuccione died, and the remaining cast and crew decided not to go on without him.

== Possible reunion ==
In early November 2011, the surviving members of 2gether announced they hoped to reunite for a concert in Los Angeles.

== Discography ==
=== Albums ===
- 2Gether – February 15, 2000
- 2Gether: Again – August 29, 2000

== Books ==
- Brian Gunn and Mark Gunn, Anthology of Awesomeness: The Official 2Gether Scrapbook, ISBN 0-7434-2693-2
