= Noah Bastian =

American actor and TV personality

- Born: Noah Dale Bastian; August 26, 1979 (age 46); San Jose, California, U.S.
- Occupations: Actor, TV personality

Noah Dale Bastian (born August 26, 1979) is a retired American actor and TV personality best known for his role as Chad Linus in the MTV 2000 TV film and the eponymous TV series of the parody boy band music act; 2ge+her.

Bastian was born in San Jose, California. His TV appearances include guest roles on Maybe It's Me, Everwood and JAG. His first movie was a Disney movie, Johnny Tsunami, and his latest, Ice Spiders, premiered on the SCI FI on June 9, 2007. Noah also appeared in the independent film The Adventures of Food Boy.

Bastian participated in a documentary about his struggles with drug addiction. The documentary, directed by his brother Tyler, failed to obtain funding through its 2013 Kickstarter campaign.

== Filmography ==
=== Film ===
Year	Title	Role	Notes
2006	Unaccompanied Minors	Jetsetter	
2008	The Adventures of Food Boy	Garrett	

=== Television ===
Year	Title	Role	Notes
1999	Johnny Tsunami	Aaron	Television film
2000	2gether	Chad Linus	Television film
2000	Making the Video	Chad Linus	Episode: "2gether: The Hardest Part of Breaking Up"
2000–2001	2gether: The Series	Chad Linus	20 episodes
2001–2002	Maybe It's Me	Ben	6 episodes
2002	JAG	Ermett Brant	Episode: "In Thin Air"
2004	Everwood	The Guy	Episode: "Unspoken Truths"
2007	Ice Spiders	Chad Brown	Television film
