= Deep Roy =

Kenyan-British actor (born 1949)

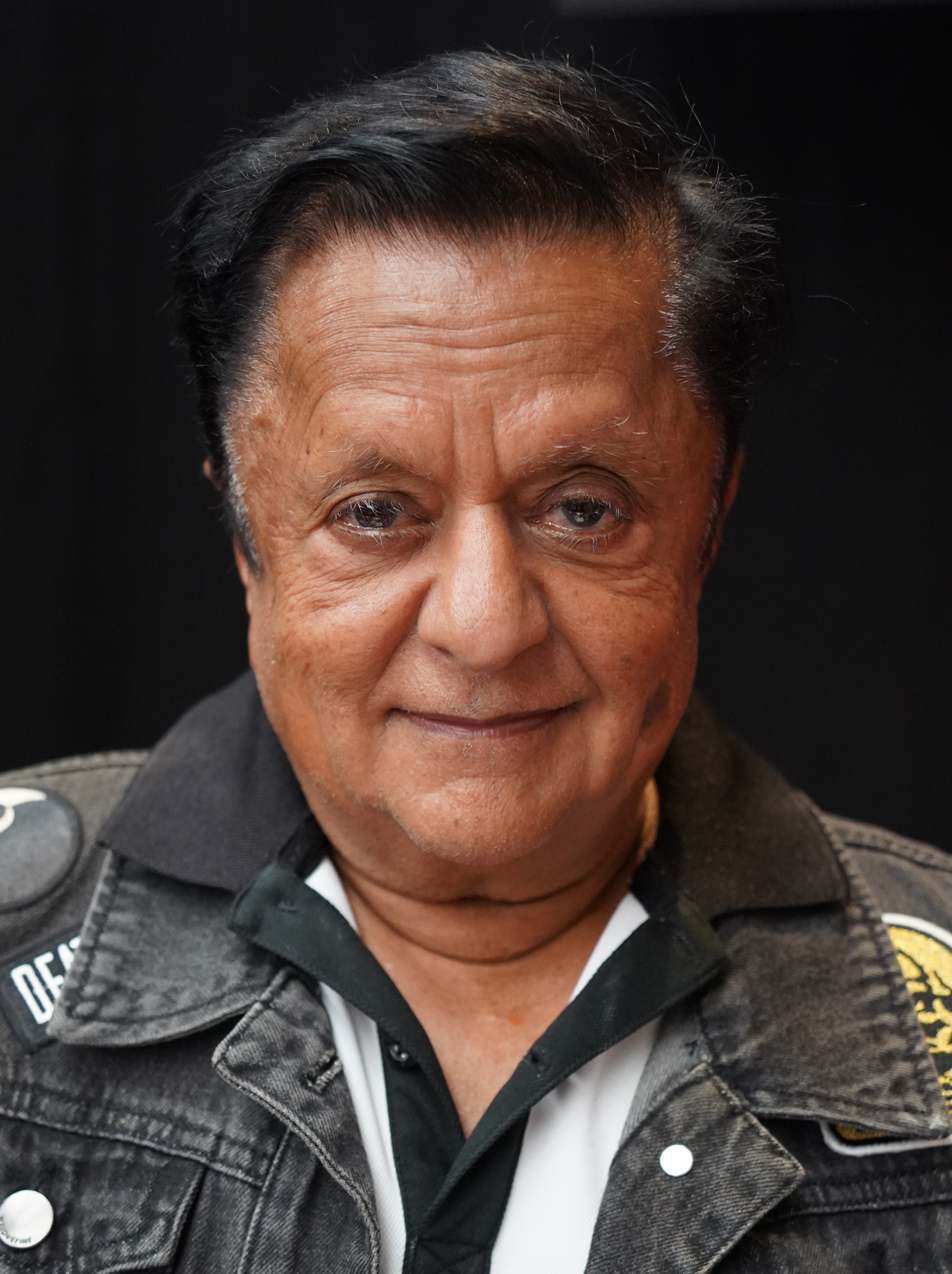
- Roy at the 2024 Brussels Comic Con
- Born: Mohinder Purba; 26 January 1949 (age 77); Nairobi, Kenya Colony
- Other name: Gurdeep
- Occupations: Actor; stuntman; puppeteer
- Years active: 1976–present
- Height: 132 cm (4 ft 4 in)

Gurdeep "Deep" Roy (born Mohinder Purba; 26 January 1949) is a Kenyan-British actor, stuntman and puppeteer of Indian origin. Standing at 132 centimetres (4 ft 4 in) tall, he has often been cast as diminutive characters, such as Teeny Weeny in The NeverEnding Story, the Oompa-Loompas in Charlie and the Chocolate Factory, Keenser in Star Trek and its sequels, and in television series such as The X-Files, Doctor Who and Eastbound & Down.

== Early life ==
Roy was born on 26 January 1949 in Nairobi to Indian parents in a Sikh family. He studied accounting in London before dropping out at 18.

== Career ==
Roy later enrolled in The Slim Wood School of Comedy and got his start in the entertainment arena in England in 1970 as a stand-up comic in local cabaret clubs. In April 1970, Roy opened on the UK stage in Ray Cooney's Miracle Worker at the Palace Theatre, Westcliff-on-Sea. He made his professional screen acting debut in a 1976 episode of The New Avengers, titled "Target!" as a character named Klokoe. Roy made his film debut later that year in The Pink Panther Strikes Again, as the Italian Assassin. Another early role was as Mr. Sin, the "pig-brained Peking Homunculus", a villain with a distinct appetite for homicide, in the Doctor Who serial The Talons of Weng-Chiang. In 1979, Roy played a genetically engineered life form "Decima" in the first season of Blake's 7 episode "The Web", the diminutive chess genius, "The Klute", in the second season of Blake's 7 episode "Gambit" and he voiced the character "Moloch", in the third season of Blake's 7 episode "Moloch". Roy was a stand-in for the Jedi Master Yoda in The Empire Strikes Back. He is uncredited on the film but can be seen in many behind-the-scenes photos dressed as Yoda for perspective shots filmed towards the end of production.

Roy has played apes in two movies: Greystoke: The Legend of Tarzan, Lord of the Apes, and again in the Tim Burton remake of Planet of the Apes (2001) in two roles, one as a young gorilla boy and as Thade's niece. He has worked for Burton in three other films, Big Fish (2003), Corpse Bride (2005), where he supplied General Bonesapart's voice, and Charlie and the Chocolate Factory (also 2005), portraying all 165 Oompa-Loompas. In referencing his workload during production, director Tim Burton called Roy the "hardest-working man in show biz". Roy had extensive training for the role in dance, yoga, and some minor instrument playing.

Roy has performed many other roles in films and on television, including The X-Files, Flash Gordon, Return to Oz (as the Tin Woodman), Jim Henson's The Dark Crystal as a puppeteer extra, The NeverEnding Story as Teeny Weeny, the rider of the "racing snail", Alien from L.A., Howling VI: The Freaks as Mr. Toones and Return of the Jedi as Droopy McCool.

Roy appeared in Transformers: Revenge of the Fallen (2009) as an Egyptian border guard and in the film Star Trek (also 2009) as Keenser, Scotty's assistant on the ice planet Delta Vega. He reprised the Keenser role in the sequels Star Trek Into Darkness and Star Trek Beyond. In one of his more prominent speaking roles, Roy played Aaron, a violent Mumbai-born Mexican criminal in the second season of the HBO comedy Eastbound & Down. Roy starred as Sandeep Majumdar in the 2012 short film The Ballad of Sandeep.

== Filmography ==
=== Film ===
Year	Title	Role	Notes
1976	The Pink Panther Strikes Again	Italian Assassin	
1978	Benji's Very Own Christmas Story	Key Elf	Uncredited
1979	The Muppet Movie	Stunt performer	
1979	Licensed to Love and Kill	Dwarf	
1979	Die Brut des Bösen/Roots of Evil	Van Bullock	
1980	Flash Gordon	Fellini	
1980	The Empire Strikes Back	Yoda stand-in R2-D2 (double)	Uncredited
1982	The Dark Crystal	Additional performer	
1982	Return of the Ewok	Droopy McCool	
1983	Mini Gulliver	Mini Gull	
1983	Return of the Jedi	Droopy McCool/puppeteer; R2-D2 (body double); Ewok	
1984	This Is Spinal Tap	Stunt performer	
1984	Greystoke: The Legend of Tarzan, Lord of the Apes	Primate sequences	
1984	The NeverEnding Story	Teeny Weeny	Voice overdubbed
1984	The Adventures of Buckaroo Banzai Across the 8th Dimension	Stunt performer	
1984	Lorca and the Outlaws a.k.a. Starship	Grid	
1985	Return to Oz	Tin Man	Voice
1985	Mad Max Beyond Thunderdome	Stunt performer	
1986	Weekend Warriors	Little girl	Uncredited
1986	Poltergeist II: The Other Side	Stunt performer	
1987	Going Bananas	Bonzo	
1988	Alien from L.A.	Mambino	
1989	Rising Storm	Joker Arroyo	
1989	Lethal Woman	Grizabella	
1990	Disturbed	Marty	
1991	Howling VI: The Freaks	Toones	
1991	Hook	Stunt performer	
1992	The Resurrected	Main monster	
1993	Freaked	George Ramirez No. 3	
1993	Leprechaun	Stunt double for Warwick Davis	
1993	Josh and S.A.M.	Stunt performer	
1994	Dickwad	Little Telephone Bully	
1994	Wes Craven's New Nightmare	Stunt performer	
1994	The Little Rascals	Stunt performer	
1994	The War	Stunt performer	
1994	The Jungle Book	Stunt performer	
1995	Sudden Death	Stunt performer	
1995	Under the Hula Moon	Bus driver	
1996	Matilda	Stunt performer	
1997	Retroactive	Stunt performer	
1998	Mafia!	Small hitman	Uncredited
1998	BASEketball	Stunt performer	
1998	The Adventures of Ragtime	Stunt double for Justin Cooper	
2000	Disney's The Kid	Stunt double for Spencer Breslin	
2000	How the Grinch Stole Christmas	Post office clerk	
2001	Planet of the Apes	Gorilla kid / Thade's niece	
2003	The Haunted Mansion	Hitchhiking ghost	
2003	A Man Apart	Stunt performer	
2003	Leprechaun: Back 2 tha Hood	Stunt double for Warwick Davis	
2003	Big Fish	Mr. Soggybottom	
2004	Surviving Eden	Indian Mo	
2004	Van Helsing	Stunt performer	
2005	Charlie and the Chocolate Factory	Oompa-Loompas	Singing voice provided by Danny Elfman; narrator's voice provided by Geoffrey Holder
2005	Corpse Bride	General Bonesapart	Voice
2009	Star Trek	Keenser	
2009	The Unborn	Stunt performer	DoubledAtticus Shaffer
2009	Transformers: Revenge of the Fallen	Egyptian guard	
2012	Zambezia	Mushana	Voice
2012	The Ballad of Sandeep	Sandeep Majumdar	
2013	Paranormal Movie	Demon	
2013	Star Trek Into Darkness	Keenser	
2014	Mantervention	Massage parlor owner	
2016	Star Trek Beyond	Keenser	
2017	God Came 'Round	Sandeep	Short film/music video
2019	Deep Into Love	Dr. Love	Short film

=== Television ===
Year	Title	Role	Notes
1976	The New Avengers	Klokoe	Episode: "Target!"
1977, 1986	Doctor Who	Mr. Sin/Posicarian delegate (uncredited)	The Talons of Weng-Chiang/Mindwarp
1978–1980	Blake's 7	Decima/The Klute/Moloch/Link	4 episodes
1989	Desperado: The Outlaw Wars		Uncredited
1996	Evil Has a Face	Stunt performer	TV movie
2001	The X-Files	Beggar man	Episode: "Badlaa"
2003–2004	The Jamie Kennedy Experiment	Himself	9 episodes
2010	Eastbound & Down	Aaron	4 episodes
2012	Wolfpack of Reseda	Mr. Jo	Episode: "Hungry Like the Wolf"

=== Music videos ===
Year	Title	Role	Artist
1996	"Grind"	Evil Cherub 1	Alice in Chains
2007	"Calm Down Dearest"		Jamie T
2021	"Atenção"	Oompa-Loompas	Pedro Sampaio and Luísa Sonza
