= Alex Solowitz =

American actor

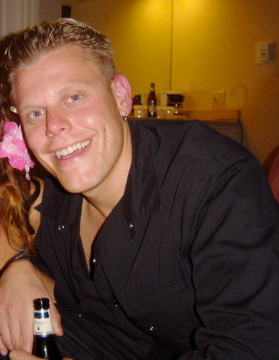
- Born: December 15, 1979 (age 46); San Fernando Valley, Los Angeles, California
- Occupations: Actor; composer; singer; dancer; producer

Alexzander Solowitz (born December 15, 1979) is an American actor, composer, singer, dancer, and producer.

== Early and personal life ==
Alexzander Solowitz was born on December 15, 1979 in the San Fernando Valley, Los Angeles, California to a large Jewish family. He has a younger sister Aleeza Solowitz, a columnist who also works in the film industry and lives between Los Angeles and New York.

== Career ==
Solowitz portrayed Mickey Parke, a member of the fictional parody boy band 2ge+her in the 2000 TV film, as well as the eponymous TV series, both premiered on MTV. Later, he appeared on a number of television shows, including Everybody Loves Raymond, Just Shoot Me!, ER, No Ordinary Family, Cousin Skeeter, Last Man Standing, and Justified.

He also appeared as Dave in "One Shot, One Kill", a first-season episode of NCIS.

Solowitz appeared in the film Gardens of the Night with John Malkovich. He also played Brett in the 1999 film Never Been Kissed, Bobby "911" in the 2006 film Alpha Dog, and Sebastian in the 2012 dark comedy Small Apartments.

He voiced the character Richard Bates in the 2011 video game L.A. Noire and appeared in the 2014 film Bad Country.
