= Rory Gilmore and Paris Geller =

Fictional characters

Rory and Paris
- Liza Weil and Alexis Bledel as Paris and Rory
- Duration: 2000–2007, 2016
- Introduced by: Amy Sherman-Palladino

Rory Gilmore and Paris Geller are fictional characters from the dramatic television series Gilmore Girls and its spin-off series, A Year in the Life. Rory is portrayed by Alexis Bledel and Paris is played by Liza Weil. Introduced as academic rivals in high school, the two gradually grow closer as the series progresses.

Paris and Rory have received recognition from multiple media outlets, including TV Guide, Cosmopolitan, and Fox News. Many writers have praised the development of their friendship, with others expressing interest in a romantic bond between the characters.

== Overview ==
While attending Chilton Preparatory High School, the mild-mannered Rory Gilmore meets a driven student named Paris Geller, who views Rory as her competition in academic and extracurricular activities. Shortly after they become acquainted, Paris taunts a confused Rory with a recital of William Shakespeare's Sonnet 116. When she suspects that Paris is sabotaging her every move, Rory publicly berates Paris before being led away. Eventually, the two have more pleasant exchanges when they unexpectedly encounter one another around school and at a party. They later attend a music concert with friends, where Paris shows signs of a gentler side.

When Paris becomes Rory's superior on the school newspaper, she assigns Rory several tedious projects in an unsuccessful effort to make her quit. This marks a turning point in their relationship, as Paris begins to respect Rory's resilience. She also wins the position of Student Body President with Rory as her running mate. After Paris begins helping her with personal matters, Rory invites Paris to spend a night at her home, and the two acknowledge their developing friendship.

They later spend a summer as roommates during an internship program. When Paris learns that her application to Harvard University has been rejected, Rory is the first person to comfort her. Upon graduating from high school, Rory is elected valedictorian over Paris, and the girls hug before parting ways. They then become roommates at Yale University, supporting one another through a number of issues. During their first spring break, the two kiss while bored in a club. This development garnered immediate interest from viewers and the media. Rory later feels that they cannot pursue a romantic relationship, however, because Paris is too "high-maintenance" for her. When Rory drops out of school, Paris grows upset and spends a great deal of time with Rory's mother, Lorelai, labeling Rory her best friend. They eventually graduate together, and Rory declares that they will always be a part of each other's lives. In the spin-off miniseries Gilmore Girls: A Year in the Life, which takes place nearly 10 years later, they are shown to be still close to one another.

== Reception ==
In an article for The Atlantic, writer Shirley Li described Paris and Rory's friendship as "something too rare in pop culture: a deep platonic female relationship that didn't come prepackaged, but instead developed in front of viewers' eyes." Molly McGowan of Rogues Portal concurred, noting that the girls "gradually develop a very supportive, if idiosyncratic, friendship". Sabienna Bowman of Bustle felt that Paris and Rory were the highlight of the third-season premiere, stating that their internship brought them "closer than ever." Cosmopolitan's Peggy Truong declared that Paris was Rory's "true constant" throughout the series.

Several writers have expressed interest in a romantic relationship between the characters. Prior to the spin-off's premiere, TV Guide's Sadie Gennis published an article titled "17 Reasons Rory's Soul Mate Is Actually Paris." The romance novel Tell Me How You Really Feel, by Aminah Mae Safi, is partly inspired by Paris and Rory's relationship. Additionally, Daniel Mallory Ortberg of The Toast wrote an extensive commentary on Paris and Rory's romantic potential. BuzzFeed.com's Cassie Smyth called their bond "the greatest romance of the 21st century," citing the gradual development throughout each season. In addition, Cassie Sheets wrote an article for Pride.com titled "10 TV Gal Pals Who Should've Been More Than Friends", with Paris and Rory listed at number 1.

Many critics have analyzed the scene in which Paris recites a love poem over Rory's shoulder. In the book Working with Affect in Feminist Readings: Disturbing Differences, authors Marianne Liljeström and Susanna Paasonen note, "Were Paris' character a boy, this scene would normatively predict the beginning of a teenage romance. The represented intensity of emotion is palpable, even though the scene is not romantic." Cassie Smyth of BuzzFeed also found subtext within the scene, imploring viewers to "read between the lines". Victoria McNally, of Revelist, applauded the scene and called their bond "the most constant relationship in the entire show".

Paris and Rory's kiss in the seventeenth episode of season four was met with anticipation from viewers and the media, drawing attention from Fox News, Spin magazine, and other journalists. However, a representative from the network denied that the kiss was meant as a ratings stunt. While reviewing the episode, numerous critics reacted positively to the scene, as did several longtime fans of the relationship. Bledel was initially uneasy with adding a romantic element to Paris and Rory's bond, but gradually became more willing. While reflecting on the series, Vox.com noted that the episode was "beloved by Rory/Paris shippers for giving them a canon kiss." In a similar recap of the show, a reviewer for BrilliantButCancelled.com was unimpressed with the kissing scene. While reviewing A Year in the Life, Nick Rheinwald-Jones of Previously called for the writers to finally give Paris and Rory a committed romance. Similarly, Cassie Sheets of Pride.com hoped that Rory and Paris would get the "happily ever after ending we always dreamed of".

In another review of the spin-off, BuzzFeed noted that both characters had long been popular among homosexual viewers, some of whom were pleased with suggestions that Paris was finally being portrayed as a lesbian. Many of these viewers applauded the depiction of such a character in a position of power, as she is shown to be a successful administrator. In a review for Bust, Rebecca Charlotte praised the relationship, declaring that it helped Rory "better herself without having to give up bits and pieces of who she was." She ultimately called Paris "a forever friend", and expressed a desire for her to be "a forever girlfriend."

In 2016, Sabienna Bowman of Bustle noted, "Paris and Rory could never seem to shake each other, and even if they are in vastly different places in their lives, these two women will always have something to offer each other."
