= Wedding Bell Blues (Gilmore Girls) =

- Gilmore Girls episode
- An episodic screenshot displaying Emily and Richard having their first dance.
- Episode no.: Season 5 Episode 13
- Directed by: Amy Sherman-Palladino
- Written by: Amy Sherman-Palladino
- Original air date: February 8, 2005

Guest appearances
- Matt Czuchry as Logan Huntzberger; David Sutcliffe as Christopher Hayden; Sally Struthers as Babette Dell; Liz Torres as Miss Patty; Rose Abdoo as Gypsy; Susane Lee as Kyon; Marion Ross as Marilyn

Episode chronology
← Previous "Come Home"	Next → "Say Something"

"Wedding Bell Blues" is the thirteenth episode of the fifth season of the American comedy-drama series Gilmore Girls and the show's 100th episode overall. Written and directed by series creator Amy Sherman-Palladino, the episode was originally broadcast on The WB in the United States on February 8, 2005. The episode features the renewal of vows by Emily (Kelly Bishop) and Richard Gilmore (Edward Herrmann). Their daughter Lorelai Gilmore (Lauren Graham) and their granddaughter Rory Gilmore (Alexis Bledel) serve as maid of honor and best man, respectively. Rory and Logan share their first kiss. Christopher attempts to ruin Luke and Lorelai’s relationship. "Wedding Bell Blues" received positive reviews from television critics.

== Plot ==
The night before Emily and Richard's vow renewal, Emily drops in unexpectedly to the Gilmore household for Lorelai to fix her dress. On the way in, Emily has a tense conversation with Luke, whose request to skip the vow renewal has gone ignored by Lorelai. Richard calls Lorelai from his bachelor party and reveals that Emily believes they are throwing her a bachelorette party, causing Lorelai and Rory to hastily put together a party at their home with Stars Hollow residents.

Luke arrives the next morning to drive Rory and Lorelai to Richard and Emily’s renewal venue, where Lorelai reveals to Emily that she would like to be married someday. Richard and Emily renew their vows with an elaborate ceremony and party, during which they have a traditional first dance to "Wedding Bell Blues" by The 5th Dimension, a song that Richard says was Emily and Lorelai’s favorite when Lorelai was three. Rory is annoyed when Logan arrives with another woman, and she eventually decides to pursue him after a conversation with Christopher about his and Lorelai’s first kiss, which Lorelai initiated. Logan warns Rory that he isn’t looking for a committed relationship, and she agrees that they should date casually.

When Lorelai notices Christopher at the renewal, she hastily tells Luke about the night she spent drinking with Christopher after his father died. She apologizes, and Luke and Christopher have increasingly stiff conversations as the night goes on and Christopher gets drunker. When searching for Rory to take a wedding party photo, Lorelai comes across Rory and Logan making out and shedding their clothes in a spare room. Luke and Christopher barge in to reprimand Logan, then turn on each other. During the argument, Christopher inadvertently reveals that he and Emily think that he and Lorelai belong together. Luke leaves angrily, and Lorelai is upset, telling her mother their relationship is over.

== Production ==
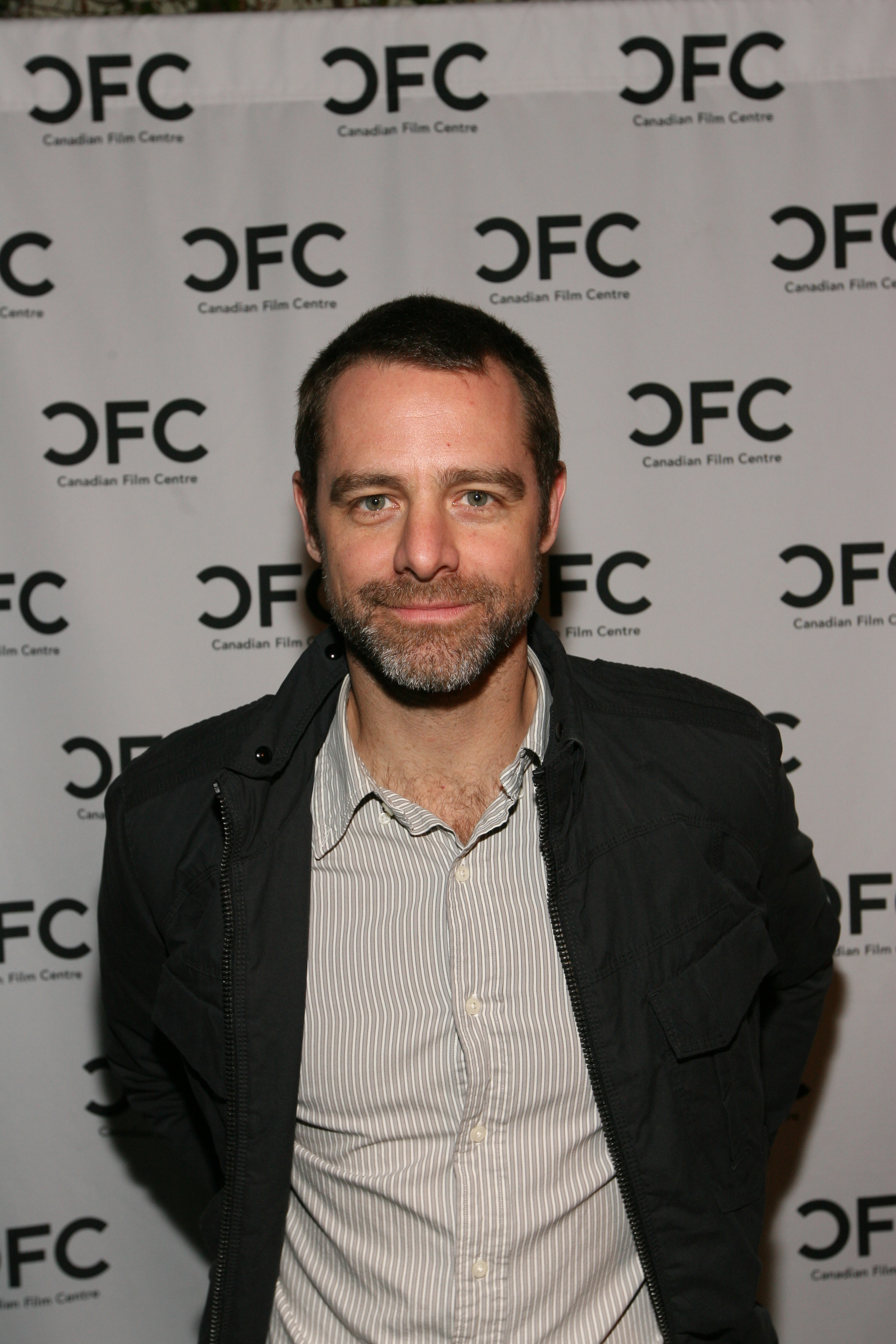
David Sutcliffe's character returned in the episode, ultimately causing tensions between Lorelai and Luke

"Wedding Bell Blues" was written and directed by Amy Sherman-Palladino, who created the series. She explained her choice: "When we did the season of Gilmore Girls where we were going to have the 100th episode, I was like, 'I’m directing that!' So, it’s good to be queen. It’s nice to be able to sit there and go, 'That’s a story I feel very strongly about'."

Following the cancellation of sitcom I'm with Her, David Sutcliffe secured a deal allowing him to return for 7 episodes, including "Wedding Bell Blues". Sherman-Palladino implied that he would cause problems between Lorelai and Luke. The wedding scenes were filmed at the Wilshire Ebell Theater in Los Angeles.

Commenting on the episode's storyline and Emily's recent evolution of character and her invitation to Christopher, Sherman-Palladino said:

In life, you never solve your family issues. You take a few steps forward and feel like 'We're communicating better!' Then something happens and you're like, 'Why didn't I see that coming? It always happens this way!' I like our show to reflect that. For all her horribleness, Emily firmly believes that Lorelai's life would be better and not as hard if she'd listen to her. But her tactics are insane. At the same time, Lorelai's defense mechanism of shutting down isn't the best way to deal with her mother. While we wanted a fancy, flowery ceremony, we also wanted this 100th episode to be a very Gilmore story — it's about how Lorelai and Emily see Lorelai's life in completely different terms. By the end of the show, they're firmly back in their estranged battleground.

== Reception ==
=== Ratings ===
According to Time Warner, "Wedding Bell Blues" attracted the series' largest audience since November 2002 (6.3 million) and achieved a new all-time series record in women 18-49 (4.2/10) and fifth-best rating ever in women 18-34 (5.0/12). The series, which placed #2 behind only American Idol, in its time period among adults 18-34 (3.2/9), women 18-34 (5.0/12), adults 18-49 (2.8/7), women 18-49 (4.2/10), persons 12-34 (3.2/9) and women 12-34 (5.1/13). The 6.3 million viewers placed it #3 in the time period.

Gilmore Girls also improved over its year-ago performance in nearly all major demos including +33% in adults 18-34 (3.2/9), +56% in women 18-34 (5.0/12), +47% in adults 18-49 (2.8/7), +62% in women 18-49 (4.2/10) and +37% in total viewers (6.3 million).

=== Critical reception ===
Maureen Ryan of the Chicago Tribune enjoyed the episode saying: "There are many things to like about the 100th episode of Gilmore Girls, but chief among its many virtues is that it's not a lame, "remember that one time when that funny thing happened?" compilation of highlight clips." She called the episode "meaty" for featuring relationship troubles and praised Kelly Bishop and Edward Herrmann for their performances. Bill Brioux deemed the episode "vintage Gilmore" and applauded its "rat-a-tat timing of the best screwball comedies of the '30s with witty, crackling dialogue to match."

Ranking the series' best and worst episodes, TVLine encouraged people to watch the episode as "it's thrilling to watch the mayhem unfold — even if Christopher's appearance at the ceremony sends your blood pressure through the roof."

Emily Yahr of The Washington Post named the episode the best of the show's fifth season.

The staff of Entertainment Weekly shared similar views, writing: "besides being the obvious best in the season, the hour’s also one of the greatest of the entire series. There’s nothing like a contained party to really inspire everything to boil over, even if the consequences are pretty dire for everyone involved. The episode’s pacing is off the charts, and every detail is pitch perfect, from Emily’s tipsy confession that she does find Lorelai endlessly amusing to Rory finally making a move on Yale’s resident playboy."

The podcast Gilmore Guys rated the episode highly (average of 9.25 out of 10), giving praise for many elements of the episode. They break down Emily and Chris's out-of-character actions, Rory's proposition for Logan, and whom from the show would be their best man/maid of honor.
