= Helen Pai =

American television writer, director and producer

- Occupations: Television writer, director, and producer
- Notable work: Gilmore Girls and Bunheads
- Style: Comedy drama, screwball comedy film
- Board member of: Dorothy Parker Drank Here Productions
- Spouse: David Rygalski (m. 2000)

Helen Pai is an American television writer, director, and producer.

Pai works at Dorothy Parker Drank Here Productions, founded by close friend Amy Sherman-Palladino, and was co-producer of the television series Gilmore Girls and Bunheads. She was an associate producer on SMILF. Sherman-Paladino loosely modeled Gilmore Girls character Lane Kim after Pai.

== Life and career ==
Helen Pai is a Korean American and was raised in an Adventist household. She met Amy Sherman-Palladino on the set of the 1996 television series Love and Marriage. They have since worked together on Gilmore Girls and Bunheads.

While working on Married... with Children in the 1990s, she met David "Dave" Rygalski. They married in 2000, and Rygalski is the basis of the character of the same name on Gilmore Girls.

Pai's mother taught Korean to Emily Kuroda who portrayed Mrs. Kim on the show. Pai often contacted her mother on sections of scripts dealing with Korean language and culture, and has quoted her mother as telling her: "Helen, you have to be very careful, because you're representing the Korean community".

In addition to co-producing Gilmore Girls from 2001 to 2007, Pai acted as associate producer of Bunheads (2012–2013, 18 episodes) and Grimm (2014, 2 episodes). She co-produced the 2016 series Gilmore Girls: A Year in the Life (2016).

== Gilmore Girls ==
When Gilmore Girls started, Pai was one of the script coordinators: "I type like a madwoman. My typing speed is insane, and I think Amy was always impressed by that." During her time on the show, she became involved with other projects. By the end of the sixth season, Pai had become involved in set design, publicity, DVD special features, and legal clearances, sound mixing, and post-production tasks. She was also the coordinator in charge of all scenes where the band Hep Alien performed on-camera.

Gilmore Girls creator Sherman-Palladino loosely modeled the character Lane Kim after Pai. Pai's husband was the model for another Gilmore Girls character, Lane's love interest and Hep Alien guitarist Dave Rygalski, although the real Dave Rygalski plays bass. Additionally, the band name of "Hep Alien" is an anagram of "Helen Pai". The band's "reunion" occurred on October 4, 2014.

== Books ==
- Gilmore Girls: The Other Side Of Summer by Amy Sherman-Palladino and Helen Pai (2002, ISBN 0-06-050916-3)

== Filmography ==
=== Television credits ===
- 1991–1995: Married... with Children – production staff (80 episodes)
- 1999: Veronica's Closet – writer (1 episode)
- 2001–2007: Gilmore Girls – producer (87 episodes, 2003–2007), co-producer (35 episodes, 2001–2003), script coordinator (15 episodes, 2001)
- 2012–2013: Bunheads – associate producer (18 episodes)
- 2014–2016: Grimm – associate producer (24 episodes, 2014–2015), co-producer (8 episodes, 2015–2016)
- 2016: Gilmore Girls: A Year in the Life – producer (4 episodes, 2016)
- 2019: The Rookie – producer - 41 episodes, 2019 - 2021) (co-producer - 20 episodes, 2018 - 2019)

=== Film credits ===
- 2011: Cowboys & Aliens – post-production coordinator
