= Rory Gilmore =

Fictional character

- Gilmore Girls character
- Alexis Bledel as Rory Gilmore
- First appearance: "Pilot" (Gilmore Girls)
- Last appearance: "Fall" (Gilmore Girls: A Year in the Life)
- Created by: Amy Sherman-Palladino
- Portrayed by: Alexis Bledel

In-universe information
- Full name: Lorelai Leigh Gilmore
- Occupation: Freelance journalist
- Family: Lorelai Gilmore (mother); Christopher Hayden (father); Luke Danes (stepfather); Emily Gilmore (maternal grandmother); Richard Gilmore (maternal grandfather); Francine Hayden (paternal grandmother); Straub Hayden (paternal grandfather); Lorelai "Trix" Gilmore (great-grandmother); Gigi Hayden (half-sister); April Nardini (step-sister)
- Significant others: Dean Forester (ex-boyfriend); Jess Mariano (ex-boyfriend); Logan Huntzberger (boyfriend; affair partner); Paul (boyfriend)
- Children: Unborn child
- Home: Stars Hollow, CT
- Alma Mater: Yale University (BA)

Lorelai Leigh "Rory" Gilmore is a fictional character from the WB/CW television series Gilmore Girls portrayed by Alexis Bledel. She first appeared in the pilot episode of the series in 2000 and appeared in every episode until the series finale in 2007. Bledel's performance on the show earned her a Young Artist Award, a Family Television Award and two Teen Choice Awards. She also received nominations for an ALMA Award, a Satellite Award, and a Saturn Award.

== Background ==
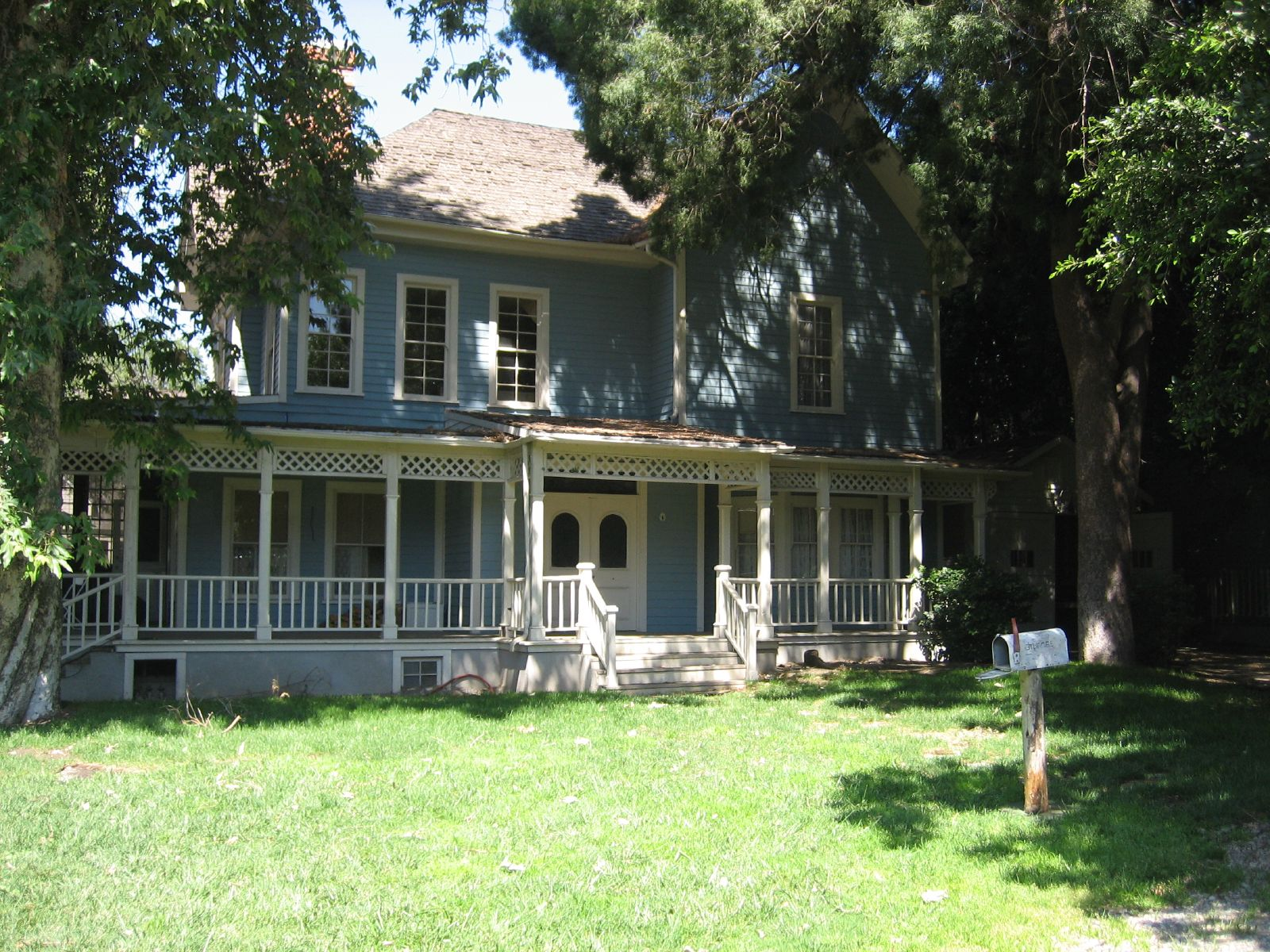
Rory's childhood home in Stars Hollow

Rory is the only daughter of Lorelai Gilmore and the first-born daughter of Christopher Hayden. She was born October 8, 1984, in Hartford, Connecticut, at 4:03 am. Every year at that exact time, Lorelai wakes Rory to tell her the story of her birth. Because Lorelai gave birth to Rory when she was only sixteen, the two are more like friends than mother and daughter. Rory shares her mother's taste in junk food, coffee, movies, music, and much more. She spent her first months living with her mother at her grandparents' mansion until her mother ran away. She spent the rest of her childhood in the Independence Inn in Stars Hollow, where her mother initially worked as a maid. The two lived in the potting shed behind the inn, where Jackson's cousin, Rune, lived in later seasons. Eventually, Lorelai was able to buy a nice house where Rory spent her adolescent years. Rory had infrequent contact with her grandparents until she started attending Chilton, with dialogue implying she only saw them occasionally for holidays, but eventually grew very close to them.

== Storylines ==
Rory dreams of studying at Harvard University and gets accepted into the prestigious and fictional Chilton Academy, where she stays for her sophomore, junior, and senior years of high school. To pay tuition, Lorelai asks for money from her estranged wealthy parents, Richard and Emily. They agree to pay for Rory's education on the condition that the two come to their house every Friday night for dinner. Before leaving Stars Hollow High School, Rory meets Dean Forester (Jared Padalecki). Rory almost convinced herself not to go to Chilton because she did not want to leave Dean, but after learning of her mother's huge sacrifices, she decided to go to Chilton. Rory and Dean date for two seasons, only breaking up once when Dean told Rory he loved her on their 3-month anniversary, and she replied that she would have to think about it, but they eventually reconcile. Dean escorts Rory when she is presented to society at a debutante ball hosted by her grandmother's chapter of the Daughters of the American Revolution. While at Chilton, Rory becomes engaged in a feud with a close academic rival, Paris Geller. Though the two later become friends, the rivalry continues into their university studies. Rory reluctantly agrees to run as Paris's vice president for student government and wins. She also writes for the Chilton paper, The Franklin. Rory and Paris join the "Puffs", a secret sorority at Chilton.

When she meets Jess Mariano (Milo Ventimiglia), Rory begins to fall in love with him. They become friends first but start to date after Dean breaks up with Rory because he sees that Rory likes Jess. However, various problems make their relationship difficult. After Jess skips school to go to work at Walmart, causing him to be unable to graduate or to take Rory to Prom, Jess decides to leave to go to California to see his estranged father, effectively breaking up with Rory. Jess does not tell Rory he is leaving but later calls and does not say anything on the phone until Rory catches on that it is him and reveals that she might have loved him but would just have to get over it. Later that year, still upset, Jess returns and tells Rory that he loves her and then leaves again.

After graduating from Chilton as valedictorian and with a 4.2 GPA, Rory goes on to attend Yale University, her grandfather's alma mater, in season four—although her entire life she had wanted to go to Harvard—having decided that the benefits of Yale outweighed her dream of studying at Harvard. During her first year, Rory resides at Durfee Hall and shares a dorm room with Tana, Janet, and fellow Chilton alumna Paris Geller. She moves to Branford College, the same residential college that her grandfather, Richard Gilmore, lived in, at the beginning of her sophomore year. There, she shares a dorm room with Paris. At Yale, Rory majors in English and pursues her interest in journalism; she wants to be a foreign correspondent, and her role model is Christiane Amanpour. She writes for the Yale Daily News and is its editor toward the end of her studies.

While at Yale, Rory reconnects with Dean, who married Lindsay (a fellow schoolmate from Stars Hollow High) straight after high school, but it is soon clear that he impulsively did it as a rebound from Rory. During the same period, Jess shows up unexpectedly at Yale to see Rory and asks her to run away with him, but she refuses. Dean gets jealous, but he and Rory grow closer and have an affair, during which Rory loses her virginity. Lorelai is angry and disappointed in Rory, who decides to leave for Europe with her grandmother for the summer to avoid conflicts. Shortly after, Dean separates from Lindsay, and they continue to see each other. They break up after Dean arrives at the Gilmore mansion to see that Rory—wearing a family diamond tiara, earrings, and necklace—is having a coming out party attended by male students from Yale.

Meanwhile, Rory makes the acquaintance of the heir to the Huntzberger Publishing Company, Logan Huntzberger (Matt Czuchry), who invites her to join a Yale secret society called the Life and Death Brigade. She soon becomes interested in him, and after Dean breaks up with her (she was detained at a party arranged by her grandparents to introduce her to the wealthy and eligible sons of their Yale alum friends, including Logan), she makes the first move at her grandparents' vow renewal. Their relationship begins casually as a "no strings attached" affair because Logan makes it clear that he does not want to commit to a relationship.

However, as time passes, Rory grows dissatisfied with their open relationship, and after a day of drunken introspection, she suggests they should end their sexual relationship and be friends because she is "a girlfriend kind of girl." Logan interprets this as an ultimatum and unexpectedly agrees to date her exclusively. On her first time to dinner at Logan’s family home, the Huntzbergers reject Rory as a fit girlfriend for their son because she aspires to work and because of her background. Logan affirms his commitment to their relationship, but the pressure exerted by the Huntzbergers continues to dog the couple.

To make amends, Logan's father, Mitchum Huntzberger, gives Rory an internship at one of his newspapers, the Stamford Eagle Gazette. At the end of her internship, Mitchum tells Rory she does not have what it takes to be a journalist, but she would make a good assistant. Upset and angry, Rory cajoles Logan into leaving his sister’s engagement party at a marina to steal a yacht and vent her frustration. When apprehended, Rory is sentenced to 300 hours of community service and rethinks her lifelong ambitions and current path at Yale. Her decision to take time off to consider her options precipitates the most sustained rift with Lorelai to date, beginning in the season five finale. She moves into her grandparents' pool house, joins Emily’s branch of the Daughters of the American Revolution, and begins working for the organization. Rory and Lorelai barely speak for months and are only reconciled mid-season six, in "The Prodigal Daughter Returns."

Experiencing some problems with the restricted liberty of living with her grandparents, chiefly centering on her sexual relationship with Logan, Rory reassesses her life after another unexpected visit from Jess. He has achieved something with his own life by writing a novel, and he encourages her to see that her current choices do not suit who she really is. However, Jess’s visit and Rory’s subsequent realization that she is doing nothing with her life precipitate an argument with Logan, and the couple are estranged for some time. Rory doggedly pursues her former editor for a job at the Stamford Eagle Gazette, takes on extra courses at Yale to make up for her time away, and is unexpectedly elected editor of the Yale Daily News, taking over from Paris.

Rory and Logan reunite and cement their relationship despite his post-graduation spell working in London, England, and a failed business. She cultivates new friendships with Olivia and Lucy, girls involved in the arts and drama, but these relationships become fraught when Marty, a friend who had a crush on Rory in an earlier season, is revealed to be Lucy’s boyfriend. Having been unexpectedly elected editor of the Yale Daily News, Rory’s tenure later ends and leaves her feeling deflated. She continues to work towards her goal, applying for the Reston Fellowship and becoming an intern at The New York Times, as well as applying and interviewing for other jobs. She turns down one firm job offer, counting on getting the Reston Fellowship. When she is rejected, Rory is in turmoil, unable to concentrate on a final exam about John Milton’s epic poem, Paradise Lost, and generally experiencing great uncertainty about her future.

At Rory’s own graduation party, where it is revealed she graduated with honors and membership in Phi Beta Kappa, Logan unexpectedly proposes marriage and asks her to move to Palo Alto, California, with him. She considers his offer but ultimately declines, suggesting they try to maintain a long-distance relationship. She says that she relishes the openness of her life and the opportunities before her; marriage now would limit that. Logan, however, finds the prospect of "going backwards" in their relationship unappealing and issues the ultimatum that it is "all or nothing." Rory wordlessly returns his engagement ring, and Logan walks away. As of the final episode, Rory had prepared numerous résumés to mail before going on vacation with her mother. When another reporter drops out at the last moment, she is offered a job as a reporter for an online magazine, covering Barack Obama's first presidential campaign and his bid for the Democratic Party nomination. Luke throws Rory a surprise graduation party, closing the original series.

Nine years later, Rory is in a rut. She has become a successful freelance journalist but was fired from a job to ghostwrite a book and gave up her apartment to stay in different places like New York, London, and Stars Hollow. She has been dating a man named Paul for two years but does not seem to be invested in their relationship. Despite being in a relationship, she engages in casual sex, including with a nameless man in a Wookie costume.

While jetting back and forth between America and London, Rory sees Logan on the side. He, in turn, cheats on his fiancée with Rory but will not leave her for Rory. Rory interviews for many more jobs, but she does not receive any promising offers. Rory ends up back in Stars Hollow and becomes the editor of the Stars Hollow Gazette. While at work one day, Jess visits her and gives her the idea of writing a book about her life and relationship with her mother, Lorelai.

Rory and her mother have a falling out when Rory tells Lorelai about the book, as Lorelai does not want her life written about. Rory continues to wander, but she is very determined to write her novel. She breaks things off with Logan for good, believing their relationship is not what is best for her. She ends up reconciling with her mother and is present when Lorelai marries Luke. Rory later reveals to Lorelai that she is pregnant. While the father's identity is not explicitly stated, the timing implies that it is Logan's child.

== Development ==
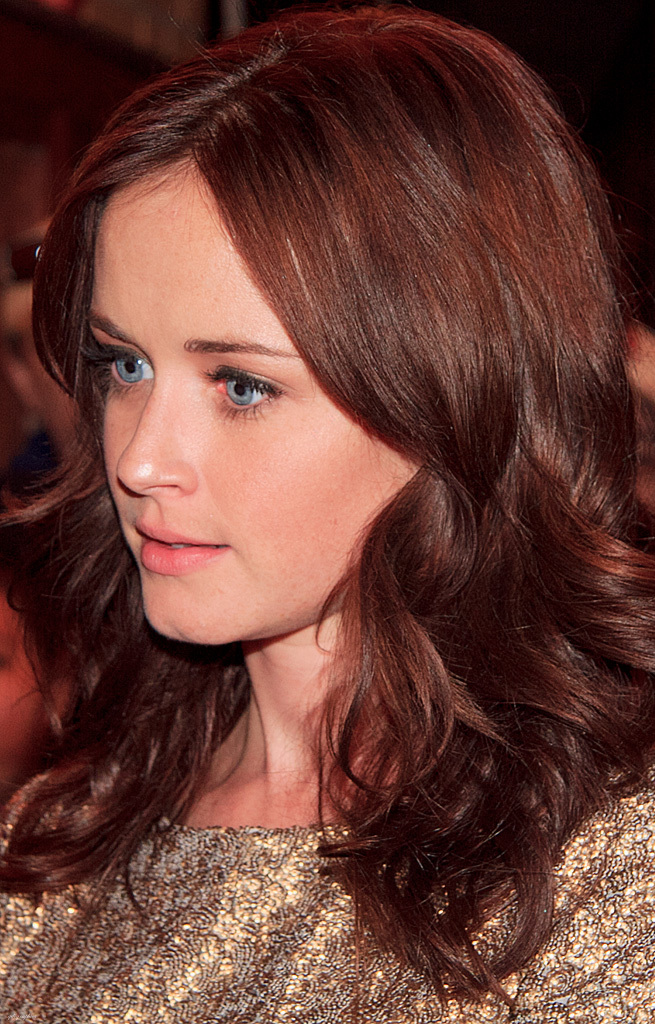
Rory Gilmore was played by Alexis Bledel

=== Casting and creation ===
Alexis Bledel had no previous professional acting experience: "It was just one of those young, beautiful faces. We were trying to find someone new, someone interesting. There was something about her. In person she was very shy and quiet, not this vivacious energy, just very simple and pretty."

Susanne Daniels who oversaw the development of Gilmore Girls said: "Amy wanted to write a smart teenage girl character who wasn't a bombshell, or a mousy loner yearning for a Prince Charming to come break her out of her shell. Amy had in mind a girl with real complexity—a kid who was fiercely independent and intellectually precocious but naïve in matters of the heart." Amy Sherman-Palladino said:

What to me had not been done was a girl who wasn't fucking around at 14. A girl who was not interested in boys, not because of an aversion to boys, but who just was academically goal-oriented and really that's what made her tick. And a girl who was very comfortable in her skin. Didn't need to be popular, wasn't popular, but didn't care. Didn't look longingly at the group over by the soda fountain with the good shoes. Because she had her best friend, her mom, and she had her other friend, and she had her life. And her life is good.

Edward Herrmann who portrayed Rory's grandfather Richard, said of his relationship with Rory: "I think that was Amy's idea from the beginning, to have this relationship between the grandfather and the granddaughter blossom. Which was very hard on the daughter to see, this unaffected affection expressed between her father and her daughter. That was a lovely element in the show that I really enjoyed."

=== Characterization ===
Margaret Lyons of Vulture.com wrote "Rory's worst attribute, other than her slouchy posture, is her lack of impulse control. Rory's strongest motivator is want — if she wants to do it, she does. Her wants always win. Conveniently for her, her wants often align with social norms for WASP success, but on the occasions that they don't, she still follows them. "

Alexis Bledel said of her character's evolution up to the fifth season finale: "Rory has been on a very specific path for most of her young life, so last season [season 4] was the year that sort of opened her eyes to the fact that there are so many other things. She realized how competitive the field she was trying to get into is, and how slim her chances actually were, and how hard she'd have to work ... when she already was working hard. We saw more about her than her academic goals, and it was fun to see where it would go. Viewers had never really seen [Rory] mess up too much. She was almost annoyingly perfect. You just never saw her do anything normal teenagers do, and Amy said when Rory messes up, it's big."

Described as "a bright, well-behaved, pop-culturally savvy teenager", Jezebel further called her a "feminist" for reading feminist prose, dreaming of having a career like Christiane Amanpour and for rejecting a wedding proposal because she is too young. Reflecting on Rory's decision to turn down Logan's proposal, Matt Czuchry said: "I feel that the show is about two strong independent women, and that refusal captures the heart of the show. And I don't think it was personal to Logan. I just think it was the right decision for Rory regardless of who her boyfriend was."

Commenting on Rory's friendship with Paris, Sherman-Palladino said: "She needs challenges, and Paris is relentless. Rory will want to stay close to that kind of person because it keeps her sharp, her eyes focused on the prize." She liked the contrast of personalities, "Rory's complete acceptance of people for who they are" and Paris's unwillingness "to accept anyone, even herself."

== Reception ==
After watching the pilot of the series, Ron Wertheimer of The New York Times wrote: "Ms. Bledel, new to television, creates an appealing blend of precocious wisdom and teenage anxiety." Variety critic Laura Fries called Bledel "the real star" for her ability "to articulate the wide range of often subtle emotions that confront teenagers." In his article discussing child actors playing "more meaningful characters", Allan Johnson of the Chicago Tribune cited Bledel as one of "two more young people who are showing some depth in their various portrayals". Shirly Li of The Atlantic praised the friendship between Rory and Paris, describing it as "a deep platonic female relationship that didn't come prepackaged, but instead developed in front of viewers' eyes. [Their friendship] should be remembered as a cultural landmark—TV’s last, great, gradually developed friendship between teenage girls...Gilmore Girls offered something that’s rare on TV but common in real life.

For her portrayal of Rory Gilmore, Alexis Bledel won a Young Artist Award for Best Performance in a TV Drama Series - Leading Young Actress in 2001. She was nominated in the same category in 2002. In the same year, Bledel won a Family Television Award for Best Actress. She also earned a Teen Choice Award for Choice TV Actress Comedy in 2005 and in 2006. Bledel further received nominations from several organizations including the Online Film & Television Association Awards for Best Supporting Actress in a Comedy Series in 2002, the Saturn Awards and Satellite Awards in 2003, and the ALMA Awards in 2006.

Rory Gilmore's reading habits have inspired many fans to engage in readathons with a list of books that Rory read during the series.
