= Emily Gilmore =

- Gilmore Girls character
- Gilmore family matriarch Emily Gilmore, as portrayed by actress Kelly Bishop.
- First appearance: "Pilot" (Gilmore Girls)
- Last appearance: "Fall" (Gilmore Girls: A Year in the Life)
- Created by: Amy Sherman-Palladino
- Portrayed by: Kelly Bishop

In-universe information
- Full name: Emily Gilmore
- Occupation: Housewife; Socialite; Whaling museum docent DAR chapter president
- Family: Rory Gilmore (granddaughter); Rory's Baby (unborn great-grandchild); Lorelai "Trix" Gilmore (mother-in-law; deceased); Luke Danes (son-in-law); Christopher Hayden (ex-son-in-law); Hope (sister)
- Spouse: Richard Gilmore (m. 1964; died 2014)
- Children: Lorelai Gilmore (daughter)

Emily Gilmore is a fictional character who appears in the American comedy drama television series Gilmore Girls (2000–2007) and its revival Gilmore Girls: A Year in the Life (2016) as the matriarch of the eponymous family. Portrayed by Kelly Bishop, the character was created by series creator Amy Sherman-Palladino in order to add a tragic element to the show's light-hearted nature. Emily has had a complicated relationship with her daughter Lorelai ever since the character ran away at sixteen to raise her newborn daughter Rory on her own. They remain distant for several years until Lorelai asks her parents to help pay for Rory's schooling, to which Emily agrees on the condition that her daughter and granddaughter visit them for dinner every Friday evening.

One of the show's central storylines, Emily's relationship with Lorelai remains strained for the majority of the series, improving incrementally over time. Bishop, who prefers portraying acerbic over nice women, based her performance on her own grandmother. In Gilmore Girls: A Year in the Life, Emily, recently widowed after the death of Richard, continues to mourn his death from which she struggles to move on. The death of her co-star and close friend Edward Herrmann, who portrayed Richard, was written into the revival; Bishop used her character's storyline about adjusting to life without her husband to cope with her own grief over Herrmann's passing, as well as drawing upon inspiration from the death of her own mother. The actress nearly did not reprise her role in the revival due to her own husband's health at the time.

Bishop's performances in both the original series and its sequel have been positively received by television critics. Critics and audiences were initially divided over the character's personality, debating her unlikeability and whether or not she is a bad mother. However, their opinions towards Emily have softened in retrospect, growing to sympathize with the character and defend her as one of the show's most complex characters who truly cares for the well-being of her family members. Despite being accused of classism and racism in regards to the way in which she treats her maids, Emily's arc in Gilmore Girls: A Year in the Life, in which she takes on a more central role, has been widely acclaimed by critics and fans alike, becoming a fan favorite and experiencing renewed popularity. Critics and fans have since dubbed her the "third Gilmore girl", after Lorelai and Rory.

== Role ==
Emily is the wealthy matriarch of the Gilmore family and lives with her husband Richard (Edward Herrmann), a successful insurance consultant, in a mansion in Hartford, Connecticut. She is a member of a bridge club, country club, the Society Matron's League, and serves as the president of local chapter of the Daughters of the American Revolution. She goes through a succession of various cooks and maids in her home, as she often fires household staff due to her high standards. It is revealed that Emily attended Smith College, where she majored in History and was a member of the field hockey team. She met Richard at a party while she was at Smith and he was at Yale University.

Emily's only daughter Lorelai (Lauren Graham) had run away from home as a teenager to raise her daughter Rory (Alexis Bledel) on her own, forcing Emily to remain estranged from both her daughter and granddaughter for several years until Lorelai desperately asks her parents to help pay for Rory's admission into Chilton Preparatory School. Emily agrees to lend Lorelai the money required on the condition that both she and Rory visit her and Richard at their home for dinner every Friday evening. Having had a strained relationship with Lorelai ever since she decided she would be raising Rory without her parents or then-boyfriend Christopher Hayden (David Sutcliffe), Emily wants to spend as much time with Rory as possible, partially to ensure that her granddaughter receives the opportunities her mother never did. She uses Chilton as an opportunity to forge somewhat of a "normal" relationship between herself, Lorelai and Rory. Their arrangement continues when Rory graduates from Chilton and enrolls at Yale University, her grandfather's alma mater. Emily and Richard separate at one point during the series over a series of heated disagreements, but eventually reconcile in favor of renewing their vows.

In Gilmore Girls: A Year in the Life, Emily struggles to adjust to her husband's recent death, to whom she had been married for 50 years. She is furious with Lorelai after she gives an unflattering speech during Richard's funeral, thus increasing the rift in their relationship. Emily tricks Lorelai into attending therapy with her in attempt to mend their relationship (where Emily reveals she is also upset over a malicious letter she insists Lorelai sent her several years ago, although she denies it), with mostly unfruitful results. Emily is only able to forgive Lorelai after she calls her mother to share with her the time Richard comforted her by taking her to a see a movie after she was humiliated in school. At the end of the revival, Emily sells their mansion because it constantly reminds her of Richard's death, moving to Nantucket, Massachusetts, where she and her late husband used to vacation in the summertime. She also quits the Daughters of the American Revolution, and starts working at a whaling museum as a docent. The identity of who sent Emily the letter remains undisclosed.

== Development ==
=== Gilmore Girls ===
==== Conception and writing ====
Creator Amy Sherman-Palladino originally pitched Gilmore Girls to The WB as a series about Lorelai and Rory Gilmore, a young mother and daughter duo whose close relationship is more similar to that of a pair of best friends as opposed to family members, but the show's concept was not fully realized until Sherman-Palladino introduced the idea of a third, older generation of Gilmores to the storyline: Emily and Richard Gilmore, Lorelai's wealthy, conservative parents. The creator explained that "Lorelai is made because of her experience with her family, and Emily is Emily because Lorelai left", believing Emily's relationship with Lorelai "added a layer of conflict that allows you to do the comedy, but at the base of it, it’s almost a tragedy.” One of the show's central conflicts is drawn from the fact that Emily is a "confused" character in several ways, particularly in regards to her complicated relationship with Lorelai. Gilmore Girls' original main source conflict revolves around "the generational battle between" the domineering Emily and Lorelai, her free-spirited daughter. Secretly, the character is proud of her daughter's accomplishments but has continued to harbor resentment towards her ever since she gets pregnant at age 16, for which Emily has never quite forgiven her.

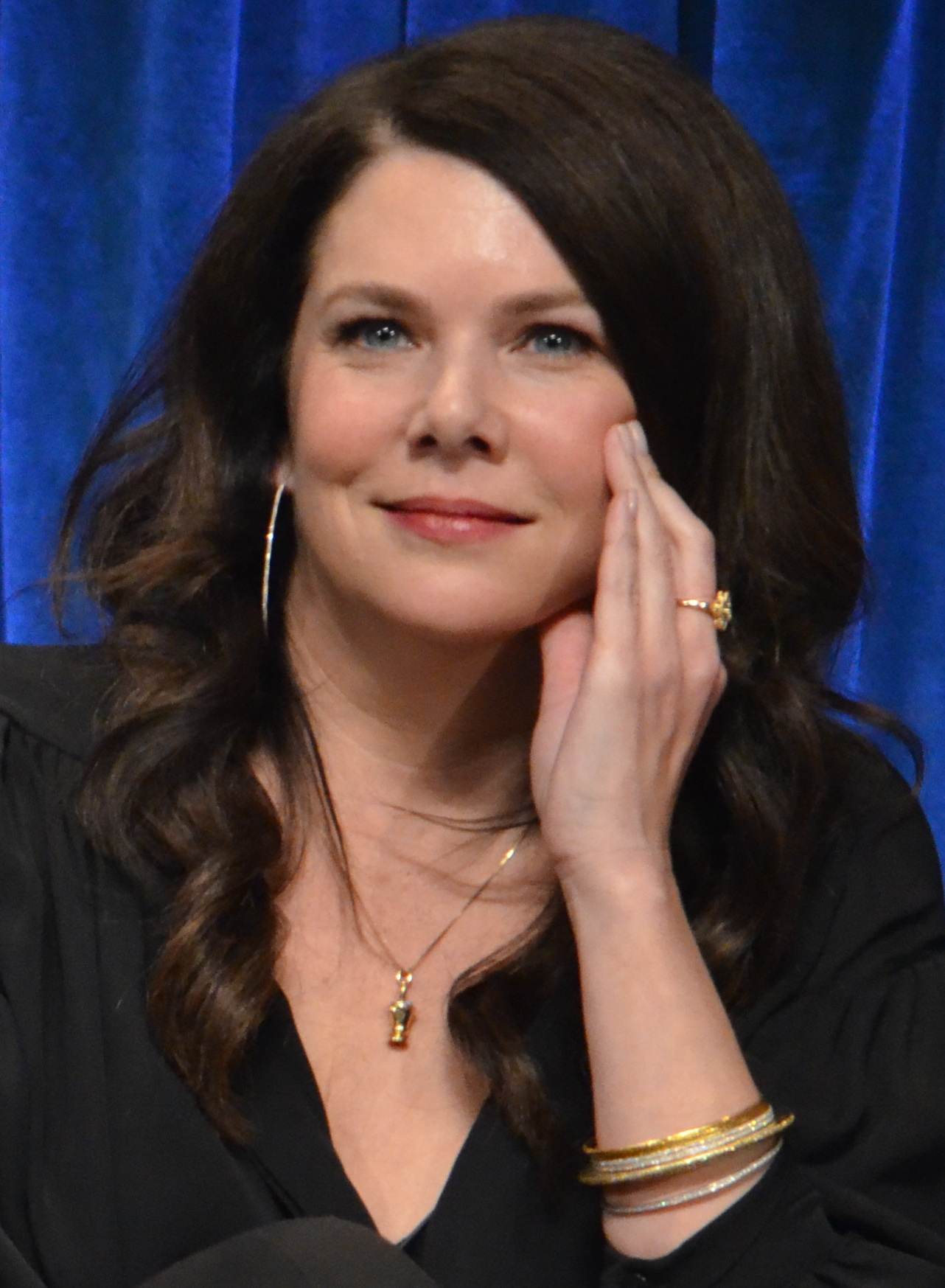
Emily's tense relationship with daughter Lorelai (Lauren Graham) forms one of the series' most prominent storylines.

The pilot episode begins with some form of dramatic change altering the lives of Emily, Lorelai and Rory. While Lorelai, for the good of her daughter, must reluctantly allow her parents back into the life she deliberately built for herself without them, Emily's life suddenly changes from barely having a relationship with either her daughter or granddaughter for several years to manipulating their financial situation so that she can be involved in both of their lives for the first time. Sherman-Palladino strongly felt that Gilmore Girls would be successful after watching the pilot for the first time, in which Emily, Lorelai and Rory experience their first of several Friday-night dinners. Subsequently, Emily's relationship with Lorelai would be explored in virtually all of the show's episodes, establishing itself as one of the dramedy's "major plot points". The New York Post's David K. Li summarized Emily's role in the series as "a cold-water reminder of what some mothers are really like." The Washington Post contributor Jenny Rogers believes Emily's was written in a way that "was supposed to drive [audiences] crazy", similar to the way in which Lorelai reacts.

The character spends many early episodes behaving as though not much time has passed since Lorelai ran away. Although initially created to resemble a "complex" villain, fans believe that Emily appears to grow "softer" towards the second and third seasons, when in fact the writers only "explained [her] a little better" by evolving the character into a "more complex" version of herself. As "emotionally guarded" individuals, both mother and daughter channel their feelings towards each other in different ways. While Emily typically avoids the topic of Lorelai's upbringing, Lorelai refuses to acknowledge how abandoned she felt by her mother, "hid[ing] her feelings behind a rapidfire series of jokes." The character continues to evolve into a more complicated character as the series progresses. The first season episode "Emily in Wonderland", in which Emily visits Stars Hollow for the first time and wears a pair of sneakers at Rory's behest, offers an early example of the character's willingness to change in order to spend more time with and please Rory. However, her relationship with Lorelai remains strained well into the fifth season; the creator explained that she retained this dynamic because "In life, you never solve your family issues ... You take a few steps forward and feel like 'We're communicating better!' Then something happens and you're like, 'Why didn't I see that coming?" Thus, they remain "firmly ... in their estranged battleground." At one point Sherman-Palladino had deliberated introducing a woman slightly older than Lorelai – a widow who approaches Emily for help on being "more than just beautiful" in the wake of her wealthy husband's death – who becomes something of a surrogate daughter to Emily. This character and related storyline about Emily "finally ha[ving] a daughter figure who wants to be like her" would have augmented the conflict in Emily's relationship with Lorelai. Sherman-Palladino identified Emily as one of her favorite characters to write for.

The tense relationship between Emily, "a wealthy mother of a certain generation and class," and Lorelai is one of the series' primary components. Although much of Emily's storyline is directly related to her relationship with Lorelai, the character has endured complex situations on her own during the show's run, particularly in regards to the fact that she is "a woman of a certain generation who had long tethered her future to little other than her husband." The character sometimes struggles to determine "How a woman of her age and position should fill her days", sometimes "play[ing] Emily’s devotion to her husband for ridicule," according to Rogers. As one of the show's higher class characters, Emily and Paris Geller, Rory's schoolmate and friend, share "similarly ridiculous lines of dialogue." Much like Lorelai and Rory, Emily speaks "in machine-gun like bursts of dialogue".

==== Casting and portrayal ====
Emily is portrayed by American actress Kelly Bishop. Before being cast as both a mother and grandmother in Gilmore Girls, Bishop had played mothers in several successful films, namely Dirty Dancing (1987), Private Parts (1997) and Wonder Boys (2000). Prior to receiving the Gilmore Girls script, Bishop had turned down several sitcom pilots, few of which she found promising; the majority of them were Italian roles due to the popularity of The Sopranos at the time. Upon reading the Gilmore Girls script for the first time, Bishop immediately found its dialogue "deeply funny" and interesting, in addition to appreciating the way in which the show depicts different mother-daughter relationships. She then expressed particular interest in the role of Emily to her agent before preparing to audition, recalling that "I ... really did my homework on that audition because I wanted to deliver what I thought Amy wanted and what I heard in my head." Casting directors Jill Anthony and Julie Mossberg selected Bishop, whose performance immediately impressed Sherman-Palladino and producer Gavin Polone, from an assortment of actresses who had auditioned for the role during a casting session in New York.

Throughout her filmography, Bishop tends to play "acerbic" characters more than "nice" ones the latter of which she finds rather "dull." Bishop enjoys portraying "nasty, rich women" such as Emily because she "can’t stand them", and thus attempts to make the character seem "as awful as possible.” Although she enjoys playing the role, Bishop admitted that Emily is not the kind of person she would enjoy being friends with in real life because of how difficult she can be, her stubbornness and self-consciousness; she based her performance on women she has met in New York, Florida and Hollywood, in addition to several wealthy women. However, Bishop described her character as "funny ... if you don’t have to live with her". Despite not liking Emily as a character, Bishop "understand[s] where she’s coming form (sic)" as a mother. The actress also identified Emily's honesty among her more positive attributes, saying, "I don't recall ever doing an episode where she was really lying to anyone or sneaking around. She wasn't ever doing anything deceptive, she was just straight-on." Emily's personality also reminds Bishop of her own grandmother, from whom she drew inspiration. Bishop also believes Emily was based on former United States First Ladies Nancy Reagan and Jackie Kennedy. Overall, the actress identified her character's unpleasant nature as "the fun [part] of playing her", and refuses to apologize for her behavior.

Bishop has always been confident in the material Sherman-Palladino writes for Emily, explaining, "I’ve never had one moment ... that I’ve looked down [at a script] and gone, ‘No, she wouldn’t say that,'”. Throughout her entire time working on Gilmore Girls, Bishop refused to probe Sherman-Palladino for information or secrets regarding her character's upcoming storylines, preferring to "open the scripts as if it was a present". Although Bishop sometimes found Emily's behavior surprising and difficult to defend, she usually agreed with the way in which her character is written, believing her and Sherman-Palladino "see eye to eye completely on this characterfrie." Bishop wanted to analyze and learn exactly why Emily is the way she is. The actress found it helpful to "flesh out" her character by providing her with her own backstory, which was often coincidentally similar to what Sherman-Palladino and the writers had envisioned. Sherman-Palladino would often write an expository piece for the character that Bishop had thought of herself years before, remarking, "well, we are so on the same page." Bishop often asked Graham to explain certain pop culture references she had difficulty understanding. The actress credits her work on Gilmore Girls with teaching her about camera work, explaining, "I’d done all that stuff before. But having it day after day, year after year, being able to work the set and work the camera, it developed my technique and it’s an exercise that you just have to keep repeating". Bishop considers the fourth season episode "The Reigning Lorelai", in which Emily learns that her late mother-in-law Trix tried to dissuade Richard from marrying her as her favorite episode because of how "bizarrely out there" and unlike Emily it was, claiming that she was "drunk in every scene". The actress also identified episodes in which Emily goes on outrageous shopping sprees with Lorelai and Rory among some of her other favorites. Although Bishop usually enjoyed the meals they were served during Friday-night dinners, she identified the confection marzipan as the worst dish she ever had to eat during a scene. Bishop practiced taking small bites of her food because she could not envision her character talking with her mouth full as her co-stars tended to do. Because the actors were prohibited to consume alcohol on set, Emily's wine was often substituted with colored water for Bishop to drink. She would sometimes be allowed to take home some of her character's floral centerpieces, which she had always found "amazing". Bishop adds that she has been "madly in love with" on-screen daughter Graham "from practically the first day we said hi", to the point of which she constantly gave her advice about her love life. Bishop said Graham "really is like my daughter".

Mashable contributor Proma Khosla believes "Bishop embodies the Emily we knew during Gilmore Girls’ seven seasons: classily dressed and put-together, with the aura of someone who’s better than you, even if Bishop doesn’t gloat about it like her character." Bishop appreciates Sherman-Palladino for employing her as an "older" actress. Although Gilmore Girls was Bishop and Herrmann's first time working together, they had met once before at the 30th Tony Awards in 1976 after both winning awards for featured actress and actor in a musical and play, respectively. They would not meet again until nearly 25 years later when they posed for a family portrait that would hang in their characters' mansion for the series. Bishop developed a strong, platonic comradery with Herrmann that mirrored the fictional relationship between their characters. Bishop bonded with Herrmann over the fact that they were the show's two oldest cast members, and would often do crossword puzzles in the hair and make up room together. In addition to sharing the same trailer, Bishop would accompany Herrmann to the Gilmore Girls set early, before the other cast members. After the series finale, Bishop maintained her friendship with Herrmann via e-mail. Herrmann's real life wife Star dubbed Bishop Herrmann's "second wife". Having maintained a real-life mother-daughter relationship, Graham and Bishop affectionately refer to each other as their TVM (TV mom) and TVD (TV daughter), respectively.

=== Gilmore Girls: A Year in the Life ===
==== Widowhood and grieving ====
Richard suffers several medical emergencies during the original series, which usually result in Emily worrying about having to potentially live without her husband. On one occasion, Emily convinces Richard to promise that he not die before her, saying, "I demand to go first." Herrmann died in 2014. Gilmore Girls: A Year in the Life revolves around Emily, Lorelai and Rory as the characters encounter new life challenges. Sherman-Palladino felt that the revival should mirror each main characters' role in the original Gilmore Girls pilot, in which "all three women were at a change in their lives." Herrmann's death was written into Gilmore Girls: A Year in the Life by having his character also die shortly prior to the events of the series. Despite admitting that doing another Gilmore Girls project without Herrmann would be "really complicated", she expressed confidence Sherman-Palladino's ability to "handle that level of emotions, but still keep it funny". The creator decided that Emily's change would revolve around the character coming to terms with the fact that she can no longer be with her husband. His death is discussed most prominently in the first episode "Winter", during which Emily's fears about living without Richard are realized. The Washington Post's Jenny Rogers observed that the character "now has a few decades of life left without the person for whom she seemed to live", forced to make decisions about dating. Feeling purposeless in the aftermath of her husband's death, Gilmore Girls: A Year in the Life follows Emily "as she tries to find a way forward through her grief and confusion" during her first year as a widow. Bishop originally believed that her character would resume Friday-night dinners in the wake of her husband's death "because it's one of those schedule structures that she has in place". Sherman-Palladino decided to write the eldest Gilmore "in an unexpected direction." In Gilmore Girls: A Year in the Life, Emily experiences more dramatic changes than she had experience during her seven-year arc on Gilmore Girls, embarking " on the biggest journey" of the three main characters. Leah Thomas of Bustle summarized Emily's storyline as "one of re-discovery and reflection." With a progression that is of equal importance to that of her daughter and granddaughter, Emily takes on a more central role than she ever did in the original series, particularly during the "Winter" and "Fall" segments, "tak[ing] the spotlight as a character in her own right" according to Vanity Fair's Laura Bradley. According to Sherman-Palladino, Emily's storyline as a new widow explores what "the death of a husband mean[s] to a woman who had a life very specific to her all of these years", encountering widowhood and loneliness for the first time in her life. Bishop described her character as "a raw nerve" as a result of losing her husband, alternating between being "right on the edge of losing it" and "a little manic", as well as having both "dreadful" and "touching" moments during her mourning process.

Emily struggles to cope with Richard's death. In addition to accidentally commissioning a wall-sized portrait of her late husband, she attempts such exercises as dividing her belongings into items that "bring her joy" and ones that do no, inspired by Japanese organizing consultant Marie Kondo's self-help book The Life-Changing Magic of Tidying Up: The Japanese Art of Decluttering and Organizing, discarding a fancy dress while movers remove her dining room chairs. Emily also dresses differently than how she does throughout the original seven seasons of Gilmore Girls, particularly wearing a T-shirt and jeans for the first time. She even attempts dating another man, only to end their relationship when she finds him disappointing. The death of her husband ultimately causes Emily to undergo the most change and development out of all the show's main characters, a gradual progression with which Bishop was "delighted", elaborating, "I liked her seeing her really evolve and grow and try to find herself and all of the different stages of grief between the pain and the loss and the rage and the confusion and trying to find what the next step is for her." Overall, Bishop believes her character channels her grief "pretty well."

Emily's relationship with Lorelai is also directly affected by Richard's passing, both positively and negatively. Richard once served as "the middle ground between" Emily and Lorelai, who was often "the most diplomatic of" Lorelai's parents. After Lorelai speaks poorly of her father at his funeral, Emily tricks Lorelai into finally attending therapy with her in an attempt to mend their relationship. Although the sessions do not appear to be very fruitful, it is the first time they mutually acknowledge that there is a problem in their relationship. Just recognizing that there is a problem is a great first step. Bishop believes "there’s a little bit more of a womanly connection between the two of them than a mother-daughter thing, but certainly the conflicts and the problems between mother and daughter arise, and very dramatically in one scene." The characters are marginally closer friends than they ever were on Gilmore Girls by the end of the revival.

Since Gilmore Girls: A Year in the Life was to be released on the streaming service Netflix, the writers debated whether or not the characters should be allowed to swear for the first time, particularly Emily. Sherman-Palladino ultimately decided that Emily would be the only character who swears in the series, using profanity against the fellow members of the DAR; she describes organization as "bullshit" three times after growing restless as they interview a potential new member, before she quits the group. Uttering "This whole thing died with Richard anyway", Bishop explained that Emily "doesn't see any point in it [anymore]. Obviously, these women were not her friends, they were her social circle ... so she didn't really have any reason to hang around with them anymore and she was seeing through the whole thing. She had, actually, the whole time. She saw the hypocrisy in their behavior. I don't know that she disagreed with it back in her other days – that was just the way it is. Now she's just looking at all of life and calling it out in a way." Emily ultimately relinquishes control of the organization to Toni, portrayed by actress Carolyn Hennesy, with whom Bishop had enjoyed arguing "back and forth as to who's running the show."

Although Emily's life keeps changing, Sherman-Palladino felt it important that she end the revival "calm and settled", at least for the time being. Bishop agreed that Emily finds "serenity" by the end of the series, resolving that "After sharing her life for half a century, it's finally her own, to do with as she pleases." She believes that the character sells her mansion because she felt "it was closing in on her", and there was little left for her there beyond her fond memories of Richard. The actress defends her decision to relocate to her vacation home in Nantucket because "she had fond memories of being relaxed and comfortable" there. Just like the pilot, the series ends with Emily blackmailing Lorelai, offering to loan her the money to expand the Dragonfly Inn – only this time Lorelai agrees to her terms willingly.

==== Portrayal ====
Having been expressing interest in a Gilmore Girls film for several years, Bishop was "delighted" to learn that a revival was being developed. Bishop was initially hesitant to commit to Gilmore Girls: A Year in the Life because her husband had been unwell at the time, and reprising the role would limit her ability to care for him. However, her family encouraged Bishop to return, agreeing "it’s something that I just have to do ... I’d be heartbroken if the show went on without me." The week before filming began, Bishop attended the first few table reads remotely via Skype in order to continue tending to her husband before joining the rest of the cast on location. Bishop was thoroughly "delighted" with the new material that had been written for Emily, enjoying "seeing her really evolve and grow and try to find herself and all of the different stages of grief". The way in which Emily initially deals with Richard's passing reminded Bishop of how she first responded to the death of her own mother, incorporating elements of the grief she had experienced into her performance: "I was manic and aggressive and pushing, pushing, pushing — because, if you stop, you’re going to cry. So you don’t stop. And I see that in Emily." She also based her performance on widows she had met in real life. Bishop learned approximately 5,295 lines for Gilmore Girls: A Year in the Life. Although she found resuming the role as easy as "putting on a favorite coat that still fits and feels amazing", she found filming all four episodes at once to be challenging at times because they were rarely shot in order.

Because of how close Bishop was to Herrmann in real life, Star invited Bishop to bid farewell to the ailing actor when his family decided to take the actor off life support – the only non-family member to have been invited. Bishop herself found it very difficult to do the revival without Herrmann because "he and I were buds on the show. We, obviously, were older [than the rest of the cast]. But we were also New York actors, and we connected very well ... There was a comfort level." Using Emily's storyline as a means of channeling her own grief at the loss of her co-star, Bishop found herself waiting for Herrmann to arrive on set during the first day of filming, and claims that the lights once flickered when she mentioned his name. She would sometimes speak to the large portrait of Herrmann's character. Bishop found Herrmann's absence particularly jarring during scenes filmed in the family dining room because "There was [an empty] space where he was supposed to be". Despite her comradery with her female co-stars, Bishop admitted that she felt lonely on set without Herrmann. The actress found it difficult to speak to Graham and Bledel because the former was busy writing a book during her spare time, while the latter seldom speaks, "so I was just kind of standing around swinging my arms, not knowing what to do." The actress' entire performance "is defined by the loss of the dear friend she had in Herrmann", whose loss she incorporated into her performance. At the same time, however, Herrmann – and Richard's – deaths allow Emily to develop in ways that might not have been possible otherwise, finally allowing Bishop to explore her character's true motivations while seeing Emily "grow a bit." Bishop believes Emily "would have probably been on the same plane that we always were" had Herrmann not died, elaborating, "I sure miss Ed and he would have loved to have done it ... but it made for a really interesting journey for Emily." Bishop joked that returning to the show in 2016 taught her that "I’m a really good actress". Bishop enjoyed Sherman-Palladino's decision to have her character swear in the series, explaining "That's the quirk of Amy."

Bishop maintains that she did not portray her character any differently than she had during Gilmore Girls due to having played her for so many years and knowing her very well. Despite being a complicated sequence that took particularly long to film, Emily enjoyed filming "the Marie Kondo scene" because "You see the first signs of Emily "going in a direction you couldn't have imagined before." In terms of clothing, Emily's clothes changes the most during the revival, beginning with her baseball T-shirt as "a slight hint" of her wardrobe progression. Wardrobe designer, Brenda Maben, enjoyed costuming Emily during the revival, particularly during "Fall", "because of the things that happen with her character.” Maben explained that the character's change in attire mirrors people who "start to find themselves" after becoming widowed, elaborating that before they can move on from their deaths they "have to look inside yourself and make decisions and quite possibly make some changes and continue on without the person you are terribly in love with. And it could be going back to something you had earlier in your life before you had your spouse that maybe you might have wanted to do but you didn't do because of having children and living that particular life." Bishop said she "had great fun" wearing jeans as her character for the first time, which are Steve Madden. Maben echoed that creating Emily's new wardrobe was fun because it "was something we had never seen before so that was quite fun for me", despite admitting that she found the jeans "ugly". Kelly and Maben agreed that Emily should still wear her signature gold necklace and earrings atop her more casual attire, explaining, "when you’re DAR ... on top of old money, you don't change up your jewelry a lot ... She's still that same person—there are just a lot of changes that are coming along.” The T-shirt bears a faded Candie's logo. After finding one proved difficult, Maben sought permission from the company to have the logo specially printed on the shirt. Maben explained that the logo "It needed to be not in your face Candie’s, but it needed to be faded where you had to really look and say, Oh, what does that say?” Although Bishop appreciated her character's sudden interest in marine life for continuing to show her growth, she disliked her speech vivaciously recounting the deaths of these animals due to being an "animal lover" herself, and the amount of takes the scene required for her to get it right.

== Characterization ==
=== Personality ===
Vogue's Edward Barsamian described Emily as a "deluded, vain, and grandiose" character who is "a caricature of East Coast blue bloods." Known for being judgmental and sarcastic in nature, BuddyTV described Emily as "snooty and very difficult to please", while Sarah Rodman of The Boston Globe called her "imperious and controlling". The Washington Post's Jenny Rogers described Emily as "A classist meddler with a mean streak"; her flawed personality includes her tendency to be controlling and manipulative at times. Bustle's Mallory Carra observed that Emily "was always a very prim and proper woman" who "expected everyone and everything to be in its proper place" until her personality gradually changes in the wake of Richard's passing. However, Emily rarely loses her temper, with Erica Palan of Mental Floss describing her as a character who "could throw down when she wanted to get her way and melt down when she didn’t." Emily has a reputation of being "a resilient woman" due to her "tough exterior and tender heart". Michael Moran, writing for The Jewish Chronicle, dubbed Emily "master of the passive-aggressive aside".

CinemaBlend's Corey Chichizola identified Emily as one of Gilmore Girls' "most layered and complex characters", writing, "While she appears to be superficial, privileged, and conniving ... Beneath it all is a woman who is desperately seeking love and attention from her family, but is unable to compromise her beliefs." Justifying Emily's behavior, Bishop elaborated that her character "is not bad just for the sake of being naughty, but she is accustomed to what people are in a certain way and she is uncomfortable when it is not as she would like. In fact, I think she's not quite sure of herself." As such, upper class upbringing causes her to often suppress her quirky, "fun, creative, youthful side" despite her occasional urges to explore it. News.com.au journalist Gavin Fernando agreed that "Everything she says and does comes from this incredibly complex, emotional and passionate place". Bustle's Emily Lackey observed that the character "is built on contradictions, always doing and saying the opposite of what she means". Writing for the same publication, S. Atkinson agreed with Emily's complexity, describing her as "one of the show's prickliest, but also unusually sympathetic, characters". Erik Mink of the New York Daily News believes that Emily is just "as smart and assertive as" Lorelai and Rory, "and more clever than either of them"; she shares her daughter's sarcastic wit, which has been described as a "deadpan" sense of humor. She is also involved in a variety of charity organizations and clubs, particularly the DAR, but whether or not her interest in these programs is genuine is undetermined.

Emily has always been concerned about appearances and sometimes criticizing Lorelai for her own choices in clothing, such as scolding her for wearing a pair of sweatpants that read "Juicy". Septembre Anderson of Brit + Co remarked that the character has "always dressed to the nine" in contrast to Lorelai's "lazygirl attitude when it came to style." Paste's Kit Hamlen described Emily's wardrobe as "upper echelon, high class personified", seldom seen "without a blazer or matching pantsuit". Kerry Pieri, writing for Harper's Bazaar, described Emily's style as "expensive yet understated". Julia Musto of Bustle felt that the character's "meticulously designed and paired outfits and jewelry" represent her "class, wealth, status, beauty, and grace", maintaining her "put together" image even at times when she is not feeling her best. Maben believes the character's original "buttoned up" style "really summed her up. It was all about how she looked from the outside and she had a certain image to relay to the world because of her status in society and I truly think that look served her very well." One of Emily's signature pieces is a gold necklace she wears consistently throughout the series, even on rare occasions when she decides to dress down, particularly the "funky, torn, not good-fitting jeans" she wears in the revival. Following Richard's passing, Emily adopts are more "relaxed fashion", which Vanity Fair's Hilary Weaver identified as "grunge fashion".

=== Relationships ===
According to Konbini's Benjamin Holt, Emily adheres to the "bad mom" literary trope, describing her as an example of "a domineering matriarch with a sharp tongue and ruthless wit." The New York Post journalist David K. Li credits Emily's "bickering" relationship with Lorelai with reminding viewers what a typical mother-daughter relationship looks like, in stark contrast to Lorelai's best friend relationship with Rory. Although the characters occasionally share "tender moments", their relationship "has never been ideal" in comparison to the strong bond between Lorelai and Rory. Emily often bestows "condescending lines and disapproving glares" upon Lorelai, who has at times compared her mother to politicians Adolf Hitler and Joseph Stalin. Emily strongly believes that Lorelai's life would be better if she would only listened to her, but the two characters view Lorelai's life "in completely different terms." The Week's Lili Loofbourow observed that the character can be "callous and even cruel" at times, even when she insists she is acting out of Lorelai's best interest. Despite disagreeing with most of Lorelai's decisions, the character is secretly proud of her daughter's accomplishments and remains "there [for Lorelai] when it mattered", such as caring for her when she injures her back and growing emotional upon watching Lorelai graduate from college. Diana Bruk, writing for Country Living, agreed that, despite being "suffocating and over-involved" at times, Emily "ferociously loves her daughter", for whom she would do anything. Bruk insists "everything Emily does in the show is because ... she wants the best possible" for Lorelai. She is visibly heartbroken upon seeing the shed Lorelai chose to raise Rory in over her own home for the first time, exclaiming "You hated us that much!" The character often uses guilt as a means of convincing Lorelai to do her bidding. Emily's relationship with Lorelai mirrors her relationship with her mother-in-law Trix, who "driv[es] Emily crazy." However, Emily is very protective of her family, as shown when she defends Lorelai from Francine Hayden, the mother of Lorelai's childhood boyfriend Christopher, and Rory from Shira Huntzberger, the mother of her boyfriend Logan upon learning that her granddaughter had been disrespected by his family, proving how much she cares for her. Emily also defends Lorelai every occasion that Christopher's father Strobe speaks poorly of her. Her decisions to leave the DAR and move to Nantucket are reminiscent of Lorelai's rebellious nature. When Emily finally moves to Nantucket, she accepts the fact that Lorelai will not be as prominent a feature in her new life. However, because she still wants to spend time with Lorelai, she offers her money to expand her inn in exchange that she visit her for two weeks during summer and one week over Christmas.

Emily's biggest struggle is trying to maintain a relationship with both her daughter and granddaughter "while doing what she thought was best", secretly wanting little more than to finally have a good relationship with Lorelai. Li believes that the character is mostly jealous of Lorelai "and would give anything to have the open relationship Lorelai and Rory share." Bishop explained that her character truly envies Lorelai's relationship with Rory because she "doesn’t know how to do it", struggling to understand their dynamic due to having been raised to believe that parents are not to be friends with their own children. Emily feels underappreciated by her family, often resulting in the character feeling insecure. Bishop agreed that her character is "weirdly insecure", a trait that makes her long for the status quo. She is heartbroken upon reading Lorelai's letter announcing she has decided to run away, when Lorelai neglects to inform her that she is engaged to Max Medina, and when Rory to leaves their home, into which she had moved after dropping out of Yale, without saying goodbye to her; Lorelai's strained relationship with Rory during this time offers viewers "a glimpse of how Lorelai and Emily’s relationship disintegrated" when she was a child. Flynn observed that the character is "often on the receiving end [of mistreatment] when Lorelai and Rory's decisions were less than admirable", but is usually willing to forgive them for the sake of maintaining their relationship. She also struggles to express how much Lorelai's actions, beginning with leaving home as a teenager to limiting contact with her granddaughter, hurt her. Emily views Rory as her "new Lorelai", an opportunity to "do over" her relationship with Lorelai and serving as something of a "replacement" for her daughter. However, despite being remarkably different, it has been noted that both Lorelai and Rory appear to have "inherited their biting wit" from Emily.

Usually depicted as "steely" and stuck up, Emily typically hides her more intimate emotions, preferring to prioritize business over pleasure and "cry when nobody’s looking" in order to maintain her pride. However, Emily's more vulnerable side is revealed when she learns of Richard's continuing friendship with an ex-girlfriend of his, Pennilyn Lott. Emily is particularly aggravated by Richard when he is dishonest with her, particularly when he neglects to inform her that he has retired or his relationship with Pennilyn. Subsequently, most of Richard's decisions could potentially upturn Emily's life. Although usually quiet and composed, the temporary deterioration of her marriage to Richard reveals "a sassier side" in contrast to being merely a wife, becoming "a woman who had things to say", while becoming increasingly resentful towards his dismissiveness of her. At the same time, Richard relies on Emily for most matters that do not directly pertain to his insurance company. Despite having been married to the same person for most of her life, Bitch's Diane Shipley observed that there have been times when Emily had to raise Lorelai as though she were a single mother herself due to Richard constantly having to travel for business. Despite being involved in several organizations and clubs, Emily does not have many close friends outside of her relationship with Richard. Emily has a tendency to interfere in Lorelai's love life, often preferring Christopher over her other love interests. In season five's "Wedding Bell Blues", Emily deliberately invites Christopher to her and Richard's wedding vow renewal in order to upset her current relationship with Luke Danes. Emily using Christopher to form a wedge in their relationship results in Lorelai temporarily severing contact with her mother. However, Emily orders him to leave her alone on one occasion when Lorelai refuses to speak with him, and voices resentment towards him over the fact that he let Lorelai raise Rory alone. Emily initially refuses to accept Lorelai's relationship with Luke, a diner owner, because she believes he is not good enough for her.

The way in which Emily mistreats her maids is used as a running gag throughout the series. Constantly struggling to understand what language her often foreign maids are speaking, Emily seldom bothers to get to know her domestic employees before firing them for trivial reasons such as "clomping around the house", and rarely keeps the same maid for more than one episode. A notable exception is Berta, a maid Emily hires after Richard's demise and uncharacteristically retains throughout all four installments of the revival, even when she moves to Nantucket and taking her entire family with her, despite the fact that she does not know what language she speaks, is unable to identify the meals she cooks and is annoyed that her large family "keep[s] appearing." Anne Cohen, writing for Refinery 29, believes Emily is so tolerant of Berta and her family because she finally experiences "what it means to be alone." As a grandmother, Kristen Sturt of Grandparents.com observed that Emily resembles "rich and imperious glam-mas" who are "as likely to bake a pie as they are to shop at Payless", as opposed to traditional " kindly, white-haired and wise ladies." Judy Berman of Flavorwire dubbed her "the quintessential WASP grandmother".

== Reception ==
=== Critical response ===
Critical reception towards Bishop's performance has been positive since Gilmore Girls premiered in 2000. Graeme McMillan of Wired wrote that the actress "plays Emily to perfection", while The Hollywood Reporter commended Bishop for portraying her character "with great moxie". Us Weekly agreed that Bishop played the character "perfectly". Lauren Fries of Variety praised Bishop as a "talented" actress who "make[s] Graham’s work easier and lend[s] a good deal of authority and legitimacy to the show." CinemaBlend contributor Adrienne Jones wrote that the actress "helped her character display just the right amount of heart and saucy venom to engage in emotional verbal battles". Bustle's Alanna Bennett commended Bishop for making her character "entirely human" as opposed to solely "pompous and one-dimensional". Writing for the Chicago Tribune, Maureen Ryan similarly appreciated Bishop's "lively yet precise" performance for preventing Emily from being "just another WASP witch", referring to the character as "often the best thing about the show" while ranking her among seven things she will miss about Gilmore Girls in the wake of its finale. Vox's Constance Grady believes that Bishop is "entitled" to an Emmy Award nomination for her performance, calling both her and Graham "extraordinarily gifted actresses who play beautifully against each other" and highlighting moments when Bishop "gets something to sink her teeth into". The critic also identified the season five episode "Emily Says Hello" during which her character sobs after returning home from a pleasant date as Bishop at her most "fantastic" and "extraordinary". The Telegraph's Rachel Ward opined that the series had always been "at its best" when the "steely...judgmental" Emily "showed [her] vulnerability". Bishop's performance earned her two Golden Satellite Awards nominations for Best Actress in a Supporting Role – Musical or Comedy Series at the 7th and 8th Golden Satellite Awards in 2002 and 2004, respectively. Fans of the series of long lamented the fact that the Emmy Awards did not acknowledge Bishop's performance in the series during its seven-year run.

There were some moments when your love for Emily Gilmore most like blossomed beyond what you ever thought possible before. Just when you thought you were Team Lorelai forever, Emily would whip up some amazing response or show a softer side that just about broke your heart, and you’d land squarely back on Team Emily where you started. Because, if you ask me, Emily Gilmore was the best reason to watch Gilmore Girls most weeks.

— Bustle's Emily Lackey, on her alternating feelings towards Emily.

Reception towards Emily's characterization has varied greatly. In 2002, Zap2it contributor Amy Amatangelo named Emily one of television's "10 Best Characters", calling her relationship with Lorelai the show's "most gripping". Vanity Fair's Joanna Robinson felt that Emily was the only character whose personality was not harmed by the series' much-maligned seventh season. News.com.au's Gavin Fernando hailed Emily as "The Greatest Character Ever", describing her as "perfection" and criticizing the "painful" way in which she is depicted as a villain. Advising fans to forget about Lorelai and Rory, Fernando concluded that Emily "is the real star of" Gilmore Girls. The Christian Post contributor Jilianne Arbonida called Emily a "better" version of Lorelai. Shari Nementzik of Cosmopolitan described the character's one-liners as "memorable", whose neurotic personality she eventually "learnt to love". As one of the show's most vilified characters who some critics initially perceived as "one-dimensional", Emily has constantly been criticized for being a manipulative character who uses wealth to achieve her goals. Some fans of the series dismiss the character as "elitist and judgmental." David K. Li, writing for the New York Post, dubbed Emily quite possibly "the most unlikable mother on TV" but admitted she is the reason "the show feel[s] real." Beamly compiled a list of "5 times We Really, Truly Hated Emily Gilmore", calling her "not quite a villain but she’s not exactly a heroine either." IndieWire ranked the character one of the least important Gilmore Girls characters at number 67, admitting "There are things about Emily that are nice. That are entertaining. That are admirable", but criticizing her for causing Lorelai and Luke to break up, among other reasons "why we have no patience with her behavior." Author Shannon Liz Miller also enjoyed watching Trix "dr[ive] Emily insane".

In retrospect, several critics have grown to appreciate and defend Emily. Diana Bruk of Country Living admitted that although she often sided with Lorelai while watching Gilmore Girls as a child, labeling Emily "a bad mother", her opinion has since changed to regard the character as "just like any other mother" with whom the character shares several positive traits, among them wanting the best for her daughter. Similarly, Kayleigh Roberts of Marie Claire identified with Rory as a teenager but ultimately grew see Emily as her "favorite Gilmore Girl" as an adult, dubbing her "the Gilmore lady I aspire to emulate". Defending the character from some fans who "might not be so happy to see Emily make a return" in an article entitled "Why Emily Gilmore Is Better Than You Give Her Credit For", Bustle's Caitlin Flynn described her as "wonderful in a different way" from Lorelai and Rory, despite her flaws, commending her complexity and praising her one-liners. Emily Lackey, also writing for Bustle, hailed the character as "The Best Part Of Gilmore Girls", calling her the main reason fans "were obsessed with" the series. The author admitted that she did not appreciate Emily's character role until the show's fifth season, when she started watching to see what the character "would do next", crediting her complex nature with making her "such an amazing character" and her criticism of Shira Huntzberger with establishing her as "your favorite Gilmore girl of all time" before concluding "there really was no better reason to watch Gilmore Girls than Emily Gilmore herself." Kaitlyn Laurie of Celebuzz admitted she "can’t help but have only love for Emily". Emily's exchange with Shira is often identified as one of the character's finest moments.

=== Revival and popularity ===
Once considered to be one of the show's most underrated, overlooked characters, Emily has experienced newfound popularity and appreciation as a result of her role in Gilmore Girls: A Year in the Life, since becoming a fan favorite. Bustle contributor Caitlin Flynn believes that Emily was originally ignored by audiences because she belongs to an older generation than most Gilmore Girls fans. Wetpaint's Gaby Corsalini observed that the revival reminded audiences "just how underappreciated and underrated Emily Gilmore’s character always was." When the revival was announced, BuzzFeed's Krystie Lee Yandoli heralded the return of Emily "into our lives." Jenny Rogers, writing for The Washington Post, expected Emily to be "the only reason to watch the ‘Gilmore Girls’ revival", reevaluating her as a "great" character upon re-watching the original series while preferring her "biting" sense of humor over Lorelai and Rory’s. Rogers also believed that Emily would be the only main character who could evolve reasonably enough to satisfy fans. PopSugar's Erin Hurley wrote that Emily "never disappoints when it comes to snark," insisting that it and her "burns" be featured prominently in the revival.

Most critics and fans agree that the character provides the majority of the revival's highlights. Comparing the character's storyline to that of a phoenix rising from the ashes, Laura Bradley of Vanity Fair appreciated Emily for "sav[ing] us from her progeny’s typical, tedious flailing", writing, "she’s no Rory or Lorelai, but isn’t that exactly what we love about Emily Gilmore?" In a separate review, Bradley crowned Emily the "Real Star" of the revival and wrote that she "is back and better than ever", praising her development as "the only [character] who shows any semblance of personal growth". Refinery29's Anne Cohen echoed Bradley's sentiment, dubbing Emily "The Best Character In A Year In The Life" while highlighting her as "the only one who truly comes into her own." Cohen also Believes that Emily has always been "the most stable, caring character" on Gilmore Girls, despite her flaws. Margaret Lyons of The New York Times agreed that Emily's storyline "had the most emotional weight and credibility", describing herself as "elated to see her claw her way back to a life she wanted." Bustle contributor Lea Thomas dubbed Emily's conclusion "one of the most touching and memorable in the revival". The Vine's Tara Watson described Emily as "a joy to watch" due to Bishop's "phenomenal" performance and the "unexpected direction" in which the character was written. Bustle's Mallory Carra identified the scene in which Emily confronts the DAR as "poignant" and "one of the show's best scenes ever". Critics agreed that Bishop's performance was worthy of an Emmy Award nomination. TVLine felt that Bishop's performance deserved a Primetime Emmy Award nomination for Outstanding Supporting Actress in a Limited Series or Movie. Writing for the same publication, Dave Nemetz agreed that Bishop "is long overdue for a Supporting Actress nomination", calling her performance "masterful" Praising her for excelling in both her characters "explosive" and quieter moments, the website joked, "If there’s an Emmy voter out there who doesn’t deem Bishop worthy of a long overdue nomination, we’d like to point you in the direction of Emily’s new favorite word: 'Bullshit.'" In a slightly less positive review, Lydia Snapper of Cliché Magazine wrote that although she "loved Emily’s transformation through the grieving process", she found her moving to Nantucket to work as a whaling docent implausible.

TVLine's Michael Ausiello dubbed Bishop "a national treasure" for providing "the revival’s most crowd-pleasing moment." Shannon Vestal Robinson, writing for PopSugar, cited Emily among seven reasons Gilmore Girls: A Year in the Life should be renewed for a second season, calling the character's role her "favorite character development for Emily ever". The jeans and T-shirt combination Emily wears in the revival has garnered significant attention from fans and the media since it was first seen in the trailer, with Mashable's Proma Khosla calling the outfit "legendary". E! reported that critics and fans were unable to stop talking about the outfit. Bishop admitted that the jeans were intended to shock audiences, Maben was surprised that the producers decided to include the scene in which Emily debuts the outfit in the trailer, at first assuming that they would have preferred to keep it as a surprise until the revival was released. Entertainment Weekly ranked the jeans among "the most shocking moments of the revival". Entertainment Weekly's Mandi Bierly wrote that fans remember Bishop "fondly" as Emily. Fans and the media have dubbed Emily "the third Gilmore girl". Bishop admitted that she is confused by how popular her character is among fans, despite her personality. Bishop recalls being surprised when fans approach her to tell her how much the character reminds them of their own female relatives: "my mother, my aunt, my sister ... The only thing that makes me a little uncomfortable is when someone says you’re just like my wife."

Edward Barsamian of Vogue published an article entitled "13 Life Lessons I Learned from Emily Gilmore", writing, "whether you love or loathe her, [Emily] provided countless life lessons many of which some of us still use today." Bustle contributor Caitlin Flynn dubbed the character "one of the most underrated moms on TV". BuddyTV placed Emily at number 13 on their "Worst TV Moms Ever" ranking. Flavorwire placed Emily at number seven on the website's ranking of "The Top 10 TV Grandmas of All Time". TV.com ranked Emily the 15th greatest television grandmother. Grandparents.com included Emily among "The 22 Greatest TV Grandparents". Bustle published an article recognizing "13 Emily Gilmore Fashion Lessons That We Can All Learn From", calling it "widely underrated" while praising her use of "accessories, shapes, and colors to make each outfit pop." According to author Julia Musto, the character also teaches "lessons about how to be an actual Queen, awesome grandmother, expert shopper, and brutally destroy your enemies with their deepest and darkest fears and insecurities." The Daily Beast's Kevin Fallon dubbed the character "the beacon of taste and class". Hollywood.com published a list of the character's "10 Best Burns", crowning her "the queen of burns." Mental Floss compiled a list of the character's "Best Freak-Outs". Emily remains the role for which Bishop is best known. In 2012, Sherman-Palladino cast Bishop as Fanny Flowers in her comedy-drama television series Bunheads.

=== Racism allegations ===
The way Emily treats her maids has been widely criticized, a common complaint made against an otherwise well-received character. Several critics have accused the running gag of being racist due to the fact that the majority of Emily's maids are non-English-speaking women of color, who she often fires. Christopher Rosa of Glamour felt that "there isn't anything funny about a spoiled white person disposing of women working in her home like they aren't human beings." The Frisky's Divya Amladi dismissed the running gag as Gilmore Girls' "most condescending storyline". Amladi admitted that she struggles to determine if the writers intended for the running joke to be taken humorously or seriously. Critics have been slightly more tolerant of Emily's relationship with Berta, a maid she retains throughout the entire duration of Gilmore Girls: A Year in the Life, some of whom have reviewed their dynamic as "generous" and "sweet" due to the fact that Berta appears to be a "more humanized" character than Emily's previous maids.

Despite agreeing that Emily's relationship with her maids has always seemed racist, calling it Gilmore Girls' "weirdest vice", VH1's Anna Cincera appreciated the fact that Emily acquired Berta as a friend, receiving it as a method of "apologiz[ing] for all that aforementioned casual racism" but would have preferred if "Emily learns Spanish to talk to her friend like humans do". Ali of VH1 welcomed their relationship, believing that Berta "bring[s Emily] joy" after Richard's death. Writing for the same publication, Damian Bellino praised Emily's growth overall but dismissed the Berta subplot seemed "false", while Kelly Anderson lamented the loss of "Emily firing people in every episode."

Stronger criticisms have endured; Amladi dismissed Emily's relationship with Berta and her family as "a weaksauce commentary on immigrants moving in and taking over", additionally criticizing the fact that she sells her large home in which they could have all lived comfortably in favor of moving them to a smaller beach house, accusing the character of treating them like objects. Despite having mostly praise for the character, Vanity Fair's Laura Bradley dubbed Emily's treatment of Berta and her family "racist", referring to it as one of the character's "more frustrating habits" that were retained for the revival. However, Bradley acknowledged that some of Emily's "coldness melts away" as the character agrees to care for Berta. Anne Cohen of Refinery29, who also had very positive opinions to share about Emily otherwise, called the subplot "tired — and a bit racist", but admitted that it allows Emily to exhibit compassion that she's rarely shown before. The Washington Post's Emily Yahr wrote that the subplot "seems out of place for a TV show in 2016."
