= Edward Herrmann =

American actor (1943–2014)

- Born: Edward Kirk Herrmann; July 21, 1943; Washington, D.C., U.S.
- Died: December 31, 2014 (aged 71); New York City, New York, U.S.
- Education: Bucknell University; London Academy of Music and Dramatic Art
- Occupations: Actor, director, writer
- Years active: 1971–2014
- Spouses: Leigh Curran (m. 1978; div. 1992); Star Roman (m. 1993)
- Children: 3

Edward Kirk Herrmann (July 21, 1943 – December 31, 2014) was an American actor, director, and writer. He was best known for his portrayals of Franklin D. Roosevelt in both the miniseries Eleanor and Franklin (1976) and 1982 film musical Annie, Richard Gilmore in Amy Sherman-Palladino's comedy-drama series Gilmore Girls (2000–2007), and a ubiquitous narrator for historical programs on The History Channel and in such PBS productions as Nova. He was also known in the 1990s as a spokesman for Dodge automobiles.

Herrmann started working in theatre on Broadway in 1972 with his debut in Moonchildren alongside James Woods. He received two Tony Award nominations, winning for Best Featured Actor in a Play for his performance in Mrs. Warren's Profession at the 30th Tony Awards in 1976. Herrmann received five Primetime Emmy Award nominations, winning for Outstanding Guest Actor in a Drama Series for his performance in The Practice at the 51st Primetime Emmy Awards in 1999. He also received a Screen Actors Guild Award nomination for Best Ensemble in a Motion Picture with the cast of Oliver Stone's Nixon (1995) at the 2nd Screen Actor's Guild Awards. Herrmann became known as a character actor, having appeared in various films such as Warren Beatty's Reds (1981), Woody Allen's The Purple Rose of Cairo (1985), Garry Marshall's Overboard (1987), Joel Schumacher's The Lost Boys (1987), Martin Scorsese's The Aviator (2004) and Chris Rock's I Think I Love My Wife (2007).

== Early life ==
Edward Herrmann was born on July 21, 1943, in Washington, D.C., the son of Jean Eleanor (née O'Connor) and John Anthony Herrmann. Of German and Irish descent, Herrmann grew up in Grosse Pointe, Michigan. He graduated from Bucknell University in 1965, where he was a member of Phi Kappa Psi. He studied acting at the London Academy of Music and Dramatic Art on a Fulbright Fellowship.

== Career ==
=== Theatre ===
Herrmann began his career in theatre. One of the first professional productions he appeared in was the U.S. premiere of Michael Weller's Moonchildren at the Arena Stage in Washington, D.C., in November 1971. He moved with the show to New York City to make his Broadway debut the following year. Herrmann returned to Broadway in 1976 to portray Frank Gardner in the revival of 'Bernard Shaw's Mrs. Warren's Profession. For his performance he won a Tony Award for Best Featured Actor in a Play at the 30th Tony Awards.

Herrmann and Dianne Wiest collaborated as directors on the Williamstown Theater Festival in its 1985 offering Not About Heroes, playing Siegfried Sassoon alongside Dylan Baker as Wilfred Owen. Frank Rich praised the performance: "If Mr. Baker's Wilfred is a bit of an uncomplicated, foursquare boy scout and if Mr. Herrmann's stiff-upper-lipped Siegfried at first arouses deja vu, they form a passionate symbiosis as the darker clouds gather in Act II. Both actors also have a natural way with the rhetoric of their characters' respective canons." During 1988, Herrmann appeared in the New York production Julius Caesar as Gaius Cassius Longinus. Herrmann stated he had joined after becoming tired with constantly having to wear a suit in his prior roles and finding Cassius the most complex of the available roles. Frank Rich opined that Herrmann was the "liveliest of the leads by far" and that he would be better suited in the role of Marcus Junius Brutus. In 1988–89, Herrmann starred with Alec Guinness in the London West End production of A Walk in the Woods. The play debuted at the Comedy Theatre in November 1988, and was directed by Ronald Eyre. As The New York Times reported, "Mr. Guinness and Mr. Herrmann share the stage uninterrupted for some two hours. The fictional play is rooted in the real-life relationship between a Soviet diplomat and an American negotiator who broke protocol in 1982 and made a private limited arms control deal while taking a stroll in a forest outside Geneva."

=== Television ===
==== 1970s ====
Herrmann was known for his portrayal of Franklin D. Roosevelt in the television films Eleanor and Franklin (1976) and Eleanor and Franklin: The White House Years (1977) (both of which earned him nominations for the Primetime Emmy Award for Outstanding Lead Actor in a Limited or Anthology Series or Movie), as well as in the first feature film adaptation of the Broadway musical Annie (1982). Reflecting on becoming involved with Eleanor and Franklin, Herrmann reflected, "It was a gift. You never get a script that good. Or a cast that good, or a director that good, or a designer that good, or a sponsor that good. And all on the same project? It was just blessed." Joseph McAuley said of Herrmann's casting, "To a generation growing up watching television and the movies, Edward Herrmann was the personification of FDR. As an actor, he stood head and shoulders above everybody else (literally—he was 6'5") and he was an inspired choice to play the Depression era/World War II president for a generation who never knew the real man who had long since become an historical figure." Emily VanDerWerff wrote that while she found Annie to be a mediocre film, "Herrmann's warm charm as FDR shines through. He's a kind, compassionate fellow, in a film that's all about the power of positive feeling and kindness."

==== 1980s ====
In 1980 Herrmann starred in "Heal Thyself", a season 8 episode of M*A*S*H as Captain Steven J. Newsome, an army surgeon suffering from PTSD, and in 1987 he portrayed Grant Stayton III in Overboard and Max in The Lost Boys. He was nominated for a Tony Award for Best Actor in a Play for Plenty at the 37th Tony Awards in 1983 and the Primetime Emmy Award for Outstanding Guest Actor in a Drama Series in 1986 and 1987 for two guest-starring appearances as Father Joseph McCabe on St. Elsewhere. In 1984, Herrmann played Alger Hiss in the PBS docudrama Concealed Enemies. During a break from filming, Herrmann praised the production: "This is perhaps the most ambitious thing public television has ever done. They were a little nervous about it, because of the cost. But they shouldn't have worried. It smacks of the real thing."

==== 1990s ====
Herrmann appeared in the 1994 television film Don't Drink the Water. Ken Tucker wrote, "In smaller roles, veteran character actors Austin Pendleton, Josef Sommer, and Edward Herrmann nail their lines like the seasoned pros they are." Herrmann portrayed Herman Munster in the Fox made-for-television film Here Come the Munsters, which aired on Halloween in 1995. Herrmann found the script "silly and funny" and wanted to play a clown again, though also admitting a lack of prior involvement with the original The Munsters: "I was way too old. I was out of college. I was going to be an actor. I have always admired Fred, but no, I wasn't swept up in Munstermania at all. I didn't have a lunch box." In observing the plot of Here Come the Munsters, Herrmann was reminded of American family values, seeing the production as parodying such beliefs: "In our screenplay, the Munsters arrive here as refugees. We resist attempts to kick us out of the country by a vicious politician who keeps saying, 'America for Americans!'" David Flint and Nick Smithson positively commented on the accuracy of his likeness. He played Harrison Beacher, Tobias Beecher (Lee Tergesen)'s father on Oz. Herrmann earned a Primetime Emmy at the 51st Primetime Emmy Awards in 1999 for his guest appearances on The Practice. Also in 1999, Herrmann appeared as President Fellwick in the television miniseries Atomic Train. Ray Richmond commented that Herrmann "makes a swell U.S. President, reassuring and authoritative".

==== 2000s ====
For two episodes in 2007, Herrmann portrayed Dr. Norman Shales, a strikingly old intern, on ABC's Grey's Anatomy. From 2000 to 2007, he portrayed Richard Gilmore on The WB's Gilmore Girls. Series creator Amy Sherman-Palladino said Herrmann had been the first choice to play the character and came in to read the script despite his agent saying he would not: "We sat there in stunned silence as Ed opened the script and proceeded to read. And just like that, Richard Gilmore was sitting in front of us." The audition had taken place in New York City; casting director Jill Anthony said his audition and that of Kelly Bishop (who was cast as his character's wife Emily Gilmore) were vastly superior to others trying to procure the same roles. Bishop said she gained a friendship with Herrmann based on their similarities: "We, obviously, were older [than the rest of the cast]. But we were also New York actors, and we connected very well. We always did our crossword puzzles together in the hair-and-makeup room." Both Herrmann and Bishop were also Tony Award recipients in 1976. Alexis Bledel, who portrayed his character's granddaughter Rory Gilmore, recalled Herrmann's extensive knowledge and habits during breaks from filming: "Ed was so knowledgeable about theater, TV, and film, and what I remember most is how he would share so much of this knowledge. He loved talking about it so we had those long Friday-night dinner scenes where we'd be sitting at a table all day, and he would share so much." Herrmann enjoyed the relationship between his character and that of Bledel, and was disappointed by the series finale "Bon Voyage". Caryn James assessed that Herrmann and Bishop succeeded in making their characters likeable while Sarah Schweppe wrote that Herrmann "was such a comforting presence on this show."

==== 2010s ====
In October 2013, Herrmann made an appearance on How I Met Your Mother in the ninth season episode "Knight Vision", playing a minister Reverend Lowell.

Herrmann's death was written in via his character Richard in the 2016 revival of Gilmore Girls, Gilmore Girls: A Year in the Life. Lauren Graham, Herrmann's costar on Gilmore Girls, said, "He would have loved this [new series]. His death was just a loss for us personally. It's given the show a new complexity and depth. It's a nice tribute to him." Sherman-Palladino told Entertainment Weekly, "It's safe to say that the death of Richard Gilmore, the death of Ed Herrmann, looms large over everything." Scott Patterson, another costar, agreed with Sherman-Palladino: "[Herrmann's death] left a big void, but Amy honored it beautifully. He's throughout ... these stories. It's a wonderful homage to him as a person and to his character as well. It's nice to have him around." After concluding filming, Bishop said of Herrmann, "There was a space where he was supposed to be, so he certainly was with us, and he's very prevalent in the show so that will make everybody happy I think, who'll miss him, but I'm sorry he couldn't be with us."

=== Film ===
Herrmann's film career began in the mid-1970s, playing supporting roles including Ezra Stiles, Waldo Pepper (Robert Redford)'s partner in The Great Waldo Pepper, law student Thomas Craig Anderson in The Paper Chase, the idle, piano-playing Klipspringer in The Great Gatsby and opposite Laurence Olivier in The Betsy (1978). He again portrayed President Roosevelt in Annie.

Herrmann played the lead in the 1979 Kieth Merrill film, Take Down, in the role of Ed Branish, a high-school English teacher turned wrestling coach. The film was notable as the first "PG" rated film released by Walt Disney (Under the Buena Vista banner, years before the creation of Touchstone Pictures). Among Herrmann's better known roles are as the title character Harry Johnson in another Kieth Merrill film, Harry's War (1981), Grant Slayton III, the philandering husband of Goldie Hawn's character Joanna Mintz Stayton in Overboard, Reverend Michael Hill in Disney's The North Avenue Irregulars, Henry, one of the characters in the film-within-a-film in Woody Allen's The Purple Rose of Cairo, and as Max, the mild-mannered head vampire in The Lost Boys. He played Graham Sherbourne, the corporate foil to Bette Midler and Lily Tomlin's mismatched twins Sadie and Rose Shelton/Ratliff in their 1988 comedy Big Business. In 1993, Herrmann appeared in Born Yesterday. He was offered praise for the role, Vincent Canby citing him as one of the four actors heading "the excellent supporting cast", and Malcolm Johnson writing Herrmann and Fred Dalton Thompson had the "most convincing performances". Herrmann appeared in the following year's Foreign Student, released on July 29, 1994. Kevin Thomas commented, "Edward Herrmann, so often a fine actor, emerges as a caricature of the tweedy, pipe-smoking professor". Herrmann portrayed Nelson Rockefeller in the 1995 film Nixon. Herrmann appeared in the 1998 film Better Living as Jack, a priest who becomes a family counselor. Oliver Jones wrote that Herrmann was in "a rare comic form" in the role.

Herrmann also had a supporting role as William Randolph Hearst in the 2001 film The Cat's Meow, starring Kirsten Dunst as Marion Davies. A. O. Scott praised Herrmann as performing "with remarkable emotional agility" while Kevin Thomas noted the resemblance Herrmann had to Hearst as being better than some of his costars. Herrmann had a small role as Joseph Breen in the 2004 film The Aviator, being assessed by Rich Drees as joining several actors in making "memorable moments" and cited by Roger Friedman of joining other featured actors in creating "lovely cameos". In March 2007, Herrmann had a supporting role in I Think I Love My Wife. Kirk Honeycutt lamented Herrmann, along with costars Chris Rock and Steve Buscemi, as character actors "wasted on such lightweight roles."

In 2011, Herrmann appeared in Bucky Larson: Born to Be a Star, playing Jeremiah Larson, a father whose son Bucky Larson (Nick Swardson) discovers his previous career. Robert Abele assessed Herrmann and costar Miriam Flynn as giving "aw-shucks performances". In 2012, Herrmann appeared in Treasure Buddies, portraying Philip Wellington, the film's antagonist. Herrmann took on the role due to the character being an English villain, allowing him to portray an antagonist with an accent, as well as being able to work with animals and make a film for children. The following year, Herrmann had a small role as Dr. Vincent in Are You Here. Herrmann's final appearance in a film was The Town That Dreaded Sundown, released in October 2014. Gary Collinson wrote that Herrmann and Veronica Cartwright both offered "solid support, although they are a little underused".

=== Voice work ===
Herrmann was known for his voluminous voice work for the History Channel and various PBS specials, including hosting a revival of Frank Capra's Why We Fight, and made appearances and did voiceovers in Dodge commercials from 1992 to 2001, and Rayovac batteries in the same timeframe. His voice work includes dozens of audiobooks, for which he won several Audie Awards. He played Casper Gutman in Blackstone Audio's Grammy nominated dramatization of The Maltese Falcon and played Peter Cauchon in Blackstone's audio version of Bernard Shaw's Saint Joan. Herrmann provided the narration for the 2010 non-fiction book Unbroken: A World War II Story of Survival, Resilience, and Redemption by Laura Hillenbrand, Josh Schwartz praising Herrmann as doing "a great job", and Susan Rife assessing his narration as "urgent".

After his well-received portrayal of J. Alden Weir in the play My Dearest Anna at the Wilton Playshop in Wilton, Connecticut, he was a special guest of the Mormon Tabernacle Choir and Orchestra at Temple Square in their Ring Christmas Bells holiday concert in Salt Lake City, Utah, December 11–14, 2008. He reprised his role of Franklin Roosevelt in 2014, providing the voice of F.D.R. in Ken Burns' PBS series, The Roosevelts: An Intimate History. Herrmann received praise, Neil Genzlinger noting him as among the "top-drawer talent" of the voiceover cast.

His final work was as narrator for another Burns documentary, Cancer: The Emperor of All Maladies, which aired in March 2015, three months after Herrmann's death. Director Barak Goodman recalled Herrmann collapsing during the first day of his work on the project and explaining his illness of terminal brain cancer to the production crew of the documentary, Goodman furthering that by this point it was clear to Herrmann that he was not going to live despite receiving new forms of treatment: "He was confident he could do this, and felt it [was appropriate to] be his final project." Mary McNamara wrote that Herrmann delivered "a final performance, equal in breathtaking courage and beauty, that embodies precisely what allows Goodman to explore the staggering numbers and many defeats without ever falling to its knees as defeatist."

== Personal life ==
Herrmann came from a prominent Unitarian family, based in Grosse Pointe, Michigan. He became a Catholic as an adult, creating a private chapel adorned with icons and reading each day from Thomas à Kempis's The Imitation of Christ.

=== Marriages ===
Herrmann was married twice and had two daughters. In 1978, he married his longtime girlfriend, screenwriter Leigh Curran. The marriage ended in 1992. Prior to his second marriage, Herrmann's future second wife, Star (Hayner) Roman, filed a paternity suit against him after he fathered a child with her while filming Harry's War (1981). Roman and Herrmann eventually married, and the union lasted from 1994 until his death in 2014. Herrmann had one stepson, Star Roman's son from a previous relationship who, as an adult, changed his last name from Roman to Herrmann in honor of his stepfather.

=== Automobiles ===
Herrmann was a well-known automotive enthusiast and restored classic automobiles. He was a regular master of ceremonies for the annual Pebble Beach Concours d'Elegance and hosted the television show Automobiles on The History Channel. He owned and restored several classics of his own, including a 1929 Auburn 8-90 Boattail Speedster and a 1934 Alvis Speed 20.

=== Legal issues ===
In December 2014, it was reported that Edward and Star Herrmann had filed a lawsuit against their accountants seeking $14.5 million that they alleged had been misappropriated. The suit was later dismissed.

=== Death ===
On December 31, 2014, Herrmann died from brain cancer at Memorial Sloan Kettering Cancer Center in Manhattan, at the age of 71. The estate of Edward Herrmann has licensed his synthesized voice for audiobook narration through DeepZen.io from which the estate is granted royalties.

== Awards and nominations ==
Year	Award	Category	Nominated work	Result
1976	Tony Awards	Best Featured Actor in a Play	Mrs. Warren's Profession	Won
1983	Tony Awards	Best Actor in a Play	Plenty	Nominated
1976	Primetime Emmy Awards	Outstanding Lead Actor in a Drama or Comedy Special	Eleanor and Franklin	Nominated
1977	Primetime Emmy Awards	Outstanding Lead Actor in a Drama or Comedy Special	Eleanor and Franklin: The White House Years	Nominated
1986	Primetime Emmy Awards	Outstanding Guest Actor in a Drama Series	St. Elsewhere	Nominated
1987	Primetime Emmy Awards	Outstanding Guest Actor in a Drama Series	St. Elsewhere	Nominated
1999	Primetime Emmy Awards	Outstanding Guest Actor in a Drama Series	The Practice	Won
1995	Screen Actors Guild Awards	Outstanding Ensemble Cast in a Motion Picture	Nixon	Nominated
