= Patricia Healy =

American actress (born 1959)

- Born: Egypt
- Occupation: Actress
- Years active: 1991–present
- Spouse: Sergio Terrazas Torres (m. 2003)

Patricia Healy is an American actress who was born in Egypt. She began acting in 1991 as Charlene in the erotic made-for-television thriller film Sweet Poison, co-starring Steven Bauer. She was known for General Hospital (in the role of Tammy Carson from March 27, 1998, to July 28, 2000), Heat (1995) and The Bodyguard (1992).

== Biography ==
She is a daughter of John and Herta Healy. She studied acting at the HB Studio in New York City.

== Personal life ==
Healy married Sergio Terrazas Torres on July 3, 2003. They had no children.

== Filmography ==
=== Film ===
Year	Title	Role	Notes
1992	The Public Eye	Vera Hickson	
1992	The Bodyguard	Sound Winner #1	
1992	Ultraviolet	Kristin Halsey	
1994	China Moon	Adele	
1995	Theodore Rex	Reporter #2	
1995	Heat	Bosko's Date	
2011	Brando Unauthorized	Dodie Brando	
2013	Mobster	Servant	
2014	The Possession of Michael King	Marsha	

=== Television ===
Year	Title	Role	Notes
1991	Sweet Poison	Charlene	Television movie
1992	Ultraviolet	Kristin Halsey	Television movie
1992	Night Court	Miss Turnstile	Episode: "A New York Story"
1992	Matlock	Randi McGowan	2 episodes
1992	Silk Stalkings	Dawn Weller	Episode: "Wild Card"
1993	Sweating Bullets	Clarissa Hays	Episode: "You Stole My Heart"
1993	Johnny Bago	Valerie Carlson	Episode: "Johnny's Golden Shaft"
1994	L.A. Law	Holly Tobias	Episode: "Dead Issue "
1994	Babylon 5	Mary Ann Cramer	2 episodes
1994	ER	Priscilla	Episode: "Hit and Run"
1995–96	Bless This House	Vicki Shetski	5 episodes
1996	Step by Step	Trixie	Episode: "Secret Admirer "
1996	NYPD Blue	Alice Archer	Episode: " Auntie Maimed "
1996	Love and Marriage	April Nardini	5 episodes
1997	Total Security	Charlotte	Episode: " The Never Bending Story"
1997	Brooklyn South	Flavia Gravenites	Episode: " Clown Without Pity "
1998	C-16: FBI	Mrs. Lutzhin	Episode: " Russian Roulette "
1998	To Have & to Hold	Cookie	Episode: " Whole Lotto Love"
1998–99	Profiler	Janet Malone	5 episodes
2001	7th Heaven	Mrs. Rita Simpson	Episode: " Crazy"
2015	Dirty Dead Con Men	Rosie	Television movie
