= China Moon =

- Theatrical release poster
- Directed by: John Bailey
- Written by: Roy Carlson
- Produced by: Barrie M. Osborne
- Starring: Ed Harris; Madeleine Stowe; Benicio del Toro; Charles Dance
- Cinematography: Willy Kurant
- Edited by: Carol Littleton; Jill Savitt
- Music by: George Fenton
- Distributed by: Orion Pictures
- Release date: March 4, 1994
- Running time: 99 minutes
- Country: United States
- Language: English
- Budget: $15 million
- Box office: $3,038,499 (USA, sub-total)

China Moon is a 1994 American neo-noir romantic thriller film directed by John Bailey and starring Ed Harris, Madeleine Stowe and Benicio del Toro. It was written by Roy Carlson. It was filmed in 1991 but "shelved" for three years before its release.

== Plot ==
At a bar, detective Kyle Bodine hits on Rachel Munro, who is married to wealthy banker Rupert Munro; she blows Bodine off. At home, Rachel gets drunk while viewing a private investigator's photos of Rupert having sex with Adele, an employee. Rachel eventually starts an affair with Bodine.

Soon after, Kyle and detective Lamar Dickey are called to the Munros' on a domestic disturbance complaint. They find Rachel badly beaten. Kyle warns Rupert to leave her alone. Later that night, Rachel drives to Kyle's trailer and fantasizes about killing Rupert. She explains that she has bought a 9mm gun. She says that she could take a trip to Miami, drive back one night and kill him. Then she could return to her trip unseen, using it as an alibi. Kyle tries to talk her down, but she flees in a panic.

Rachel arrives at a hotel in Miami, and the concierge hands her an envelope which contains the picture of a rental car and its keys. Later, she leaves the hotel at night, without noticing Adele sitting in the lobby. She gets in the rental car and drives back to her home. Meanwhile, Adele enters her hotel room.

Instead of driving home, Rachel drives to Kyle's trailer, and he agrees to drive her home to get her things. He waits in the car as she packs a suitcase. Kyle does not see Rupert returning home, and when Rupert encounters Rachel in the act of leaving him, he flies into a rage. She gets her gun and shoots him twice in self-defense. She stops Kyle from calling the police because she points out that she drove back from Miami without checking out of her hotel, just like her murder fantasy. Rachel knows she would look guilty, and Kyle agrees to help her cover her tracks. He helps her clear the crime scene, even removing the bullets from the wall, spackling over the holes and painting them. They dump Rupert's body in the same lake where they first had sex. Back at the house, Kyle turns on the humidifiers to erase any of his fingerprints.

Rachel returns to the hotel in Miami and has brunch by the pool the next morning. After returning home, she sticks to Kyle's plan and calls Rupert's bank. Rupert's secretary informs Rachel that he has not been in to work, and Rachel reports him missing to the police. Kyle and Lamar are assigned to the case. During their interviews with Rachel, Lamar is skeptical of her story, pointing out all its inconsistencies. Lamar casually hypothesizes that Rachel killed Rupert with the help of one of her many boyfriends. He tells Kyle that Rachel is well known for manipulating men, and that, with the millions she would inherit from Rupert, it was likely that she got one of her boyfriends to help her kill Rupert and dispose of his body.

Lamar later gets a tip about a car being out at the lake on the night of the murder. The police divers find Rupert's body. During the autopsy, the coroner extracts a bullet from Rupert's chest. The bullet is a .38, which is the caliber of gun that Kyle carries. During his first date with Rachel, she had inquired about the caliber of his gun.

Back at the Munro house, Kyle discovers the photos of Rupert and Adele in Rachel's wardrobe. The crime scene technician discovers a bullet hole in the wall, and the extracted bullet is also a .38. Kyle is summoned to a meeting with his supervisor, who suspends him pending an investigation into his involvement with the case. He orders Kyle to surrender his pistol.

Later that day, Lamar arrives at Kyle's trailer and asks him to come in for some more questioning. The pistol he surrendered did not match the serial number on his service weapon. Sitting in the back seat of Lamar's car, Kyle fixates on a compass that sits on Lamar's dashboard. After a second, more forceful interrogation with his supervisor and Lamar, Kyle returns home and re-examines the pictures he discovered at Rachel's. He identifies Lamar's compass in the bottom of the frame of one of the pictures.

Adele meets with Lamar, who pays her for her part in the scheme, after she shows him a ticket to prove that she is leaving town. He promises to pay her the rest of her share once he has received his cut. Kyle sneaks into Rachel's house and confronts her about the scheme. She confesses that Rupert was going to leave her with nothing, and that Lamar had concocted the scheme to make sure she inherited all of Rupert's fortune. She swears that, despite the fact that Lamar had designated Kyle as the fall guy, she had fallen in love with him.

Kyle orders her to set up a meeting with Lamar at the bar where they met. There, Kyle confronts Lamar. He confirms that Lamar had switched out the 9mm bullet for a .38 during the coroner inquest. He asks Lamar where his service revolver is, and Lamar says it is in his car. Kyle forces Lamar out to his car at gunpoint to retrieve the .38. The bartender sees Kyle's gun at Lamar's back and calls the police. They arrive as Kyle is searching for his pistol underneath the driver's seat in Lamar's car. Lamar calls out to the police that Kyle has a gun, and they open fire, killing Kyle. A distraught Rachel runs over to Kyle as he lies dying. She picks up the .38 and kills Lamar.

== Cast ==
- Ed Harris as Kyle Bodine
- Madeleine Stowe as Rachel Munro
- Charles Dance as Rupert Munro
- Benicio del Toro as Lamar Dickey
- Patricia Healy as Adele
- Tim Powell as Fraker
- Pruitt Taylor Vince as Daryl Jeeters
- Roger Aaron Brown as Police Captain

== Production ==
The film was shot in DeLuxe color on location in Florida, using Panavision equipment, in the locations of Bartow, Lakeland and Tampa.

== Reception ==
China Moon has a 40% approval rating on Rotten Tomatoes.

== Year-end lists ==
- Top 5 runners-up (not ranked) – Scott Schuldt, The Oklahoman

== Home media ==
On July 12, 1994, Orion Home Video released the film on VHS. Then MGM Home Entertainment released it through their Movie Time label on July 28, 1998. The film also came out on DVD December 25, 2001.

== Soundtrack ==
The score for the film was composed and conducted by George Fenton. The following songs are used in the film:

- "Well, Well, Well, Baby-La"
- "Tell Me What I Want to Hear"
- "Rack 'Em Up"
- "Pink Lemonade"
- "Remember Slow Fox?"

Some of the live music scenes include Sam Myers on harmonica and vocals, and Anson Funderburgh on electric guitar.
