= Gilmore Girls: A Year in the Life =

2016 American comedy-drama miniseries

- Promotional poster
- Genre: Comedy drama; Family drama; slice-of-life
- Created by: Amy Sherman-Palladino
- Written by: Amy Sherman-Palladino; Daniel Palladino
- Directed by: Amy Sherman-Palladino; Daniel Palladino
- Starring: Lauren Graham; Alexis Bledel; Scott Patterson; Kelly Bishop
- Ending theme: "Where You Lead" by Carole King and Louise Goffin
- Composer: Sam Phillips
- Country of origin: United States
- Original language: English
- No. of episodes: 4

Production
- Executive producers: Amy Sherman-Palladino; Daniel Palladino
- Producers: Helen Pai; Dylan K. Massin
- Production locations: Burbank, California; Beverly Hills, California
- Cinematography: Steve Mason; Alex Nepomniaschy
- Camera setup: Single-camera
- Running time: 88–102 minutes
- Production companies: Dorothy Parker Drank Here Productions; Warner Bros. Television

Original release
- Network: Netflix
- Release: November 25, 2016

Related
- Gilmore Girls

Gilmore Girls: A Year in the Life is an American comedy-drama television miniseries created by Amy Sherman-Palladino and starring Lauren Graham and Alexis Bledel. It serves as a sequel to the television series Gilmore Girls, set nine years after the series finale. The series consists of four episodes, each lasting between 88 and 102 minutes, with each episode representing one of the four seasons of the year.

The miniseries marked the return of Sherman-Palladino and her husband Daniel Palladino to the Gilmore Girls franchise, following their departure after the show's sixth season. Development began in 2015 after years of speculation about a possible revival, facilitated by the series' renewed popularity through streaming on Netflix. Most of the original cast returned, including Melissa McCarthy, Kelly Bishop, Scott Patterson, and Keiko Agena. Filming took place primarily at the Warner Bros. lot in Burbank, California, with additional exterior scenes shot in and around Los Angeles. The production sought to replicate the visual style and tone of the original series, while incorporating contemporary themes and changes in the characters' lives nearly a decade later.

A Year in the Life was released worldwide on Netflix on November 25, 2016. The miniseries received generally positive reviews from critics and audiences, who praised the performances, nostalgic tone, and continuation of the story, though some criticized its pacing, structure and characterization. It was among the most-watched Netflix original releases of 2016 and was later recognized by media outlets as one of the most notable television revivals of the decade. The series later broadcast on The CW and Up TV in November 2020.

== Plot ==
Due to her frequent travels as a freelance journalist, Rory Gilmore (Alexis Bledel) gives up her Brooklyn apartment in favor of staying at her friends' homes in New York, Stars Hollow, and London. In London, Rory stays with Logan Huntzberger (Matt Czuchry) while working on a book project for the eccentric Naomi Shropshire (Alex Kingston). Although Logan is engaged, Rory and Logan are in a no-strings-attached affair. Rory has a boyfriend named Paul, though she never remembers him. When Naomi fires her from the book project and Logan's fiancée moves in with him, Rory struggles with her lack of a career and her dubious relationship with Logan. She meets with ex-boyfriend Jess Mariano (Milo Ventimiglia), who encourages her to write her own book about her life with her mother.

Emily Gilmore (Kelly Bishop) grieves the recent death of her husband Richard (Edward Herrmann) and tricks her daughter Lorelai Gilmore (Lauren Graham) into starting therapy with her. Lorelai has also been feeling lost due to the death of her father, the career progressions of her long-time business partners, and her relationship with Luke Danes (Scott Patterson). Lorelai and Luke have been dating for over ten years but have yet to marry or discuss children. They consider using a surrogate, and attend a fertility clinic run by Paris Geller (Liza Weil). After fighting with Lorelai about the book idea, Rory storms off, and Lorelai heads to Patty's Dance Studio where Stars Hollow: The Musical is being performed. Leading lady Violet (Sutton Foster)'s ballad ("Unbreakable") inspires Lorelai to go on the Pacific Crest Trail and forget about her problems in a similar manner to Wild.

Emily eventually accepts her husband's death, puts the family home up for sale, effectively quits the Daughters of the American Revolution, and moves to Nantucket, single and independent for the first time in her life. Despite never actually hiking, Lorelai returns from her trip, reconciles with Emily and Rory, and asks Luke to marry her. Rory visits her father, Christopher Hayden (David Sutcliffe), to inform him of the wedding. She asks him why he allowed Lorelai to raise her as a single mother, and he responds that it seemed to be the best choice at the time. Luke and Lorelai marry in the gazebo and, in the final scene of the series, Rory reveals to Lorelai that she is pregnant.

== Cast and characters ==
=== Main ===
- Lauren Graham as Lorelai Gilmore
- Alexis Bledel as Rory Gilmore
- Scott Patterson as Luke Danes
- Kelly Bishop as Emily Gilmore

=== Recurring ===
- Keiko Agena as Lane Kim
- Yanic Truesdale as Michel Gerard
- Liza Weil as Paris Geller
- Sean Gunn as Kirk Gleason
- Matt Czuchry as Logan Huntzberger
- Milo Ventimiglia as Jess Mariano
- Liz Torres as Miss Patty
- Sally Struthers as Babette Dell
- Michael Winters as Taylor Doose
- Rose Abdoo as Gypsy / Berta
- Ray Wise as Jack Smith
- Alex Kingston as Naomi Shropshire
- Mike Gandolfi as Andrew
- Todd Lowe as Zach Van Gerbig
- John Cabrera as Brian Fuller
- Aris Alvarado as Caesar
- Danny Strong as Doyle McMaster
- Armand Vasquez as Eric

=== Guest ===
- Paul Anka as himself
- Sebastian Bach as Gil
- Rini Bell as Lulu
- Emily Bergl as Francie Jarvis
- Julie Berman as Serena Ainsworth
- Christian Borle as Carl
- Alex Borstein as Miss Celine
- Dan Bucatinsky as Jim Nelson
- Kerry Butler as Claudia
- Roy Choi as himself
- Jackson Douglas as Jackson Belleville
- Chris Eigeman as Jason Stiles
- Sutton Foster as Violet
- Louise Goffin as Louise
- Julia Goldani Telles as Sandee
- Gregg Henry as Mitchum Huntzberger
- Nick Holmes as Robert
- Carole King as Sophie
- Peter Krause as Park Ranger #2
- Emily Kuroda as Mrs. Kim
- Grant Lee Phillips as Grant
- Alan Loayza as Colin McCrae
- Vanessa Marano as April Nardini
- Dakin Matthews as Hanlin Charleston
- Melissa McCarthy as Sookie St. James
- Stacey Oristano as Allie
- Jared Padalecki as Dean Forester
- Sam Pancake as Donald
- Rachael Ray as herself
- Jason Ritter as Park Ranger #1
- Ted Rooney as Morey Dell
- Tanc Sade as Finn
- David Sutcliffe as Christopher Hayden
- Mae Whitman as Marcy

== Episodes ==
No.	Title	Directed by	Written by	Original release date	Prod. code
1	"Winter"	Amy Sherman-Palladino	Amy Sherman-Palladino	November 25, 2016	4X7701
Following a career high of having an article published in The New Yorker, Rory returns to Stars Hollow to contemplate her next steps. Later, it is revealed that she is having an affair with Logan, who is engaged to an heiress while Rory is dating a new man, Paul. Emily struggles with the recent death of Richard and tricks Lorelai into attending therapy. Lorelai and Michel struggle to find a chef to replace Sookie at the inn.
2	"Spring"	Daniel Palladino	Daniel Palladino	November 25, 2016	4X7702
Lorelai and Emily continue attending therapy together, though Emily eventually stops going. In London, Rory abandons her book proposal with Naomi and, instead, decides to write about her childhood in Stars Hollow. She also continues to see Logan in private. Emily attempts to convince Luke to franchise Luke's Diner and Emily accidentally reveals that Lorelai is attending therapy. Luke and Lorelai argue about therapy and trust issues. Rory and Paris visit Chilton; a website that has been courting Rory decides not to hire Rory.
3	"Summer"	Daniel Palladino	Daniel Palladino	November 25, 2016	4X7703
Taylor announces that he is writing Stars Hollow: The Musical, based on the town's history. Lorelai attends as a preview audience member and is the only one noticing the numerous problems with the show. Meanwhile, Rory volunteers to work as editor in chief for the Stars Hollow Gazette. Jess visits Rory and convinces her to write a book about her life. Rory proposes her book idea to Lorelai which goes over badly. At the end of the episode, Lorelai tells Luke that she needs to go away in the style of Wild.
4	"Fall"	Amy Sherman-Palladino	Amy Sherman-Palladino	November 25, 2016	4X7704
Lorelai's plan to recreate Wild does not go as planned, and she calls and makes amends with Emily over Richard's death. Lorelai comes back to Luke, suggesting that they get married. Meanwhile, Logan and his friends take Rory out for an evening. Emily quits the DAR, moves to Nantucket, and gets a job at a museum. Rory meets with her father and asks him about Lorelai's pregnancy with Rory and seeks his advice. Lorelai and Luke are quietly married in the gazebo just hours before their townwide event. Rory quietly reveals to her mom that she is pregnant.

== Production ==
=== Development ===
On September 15, 2010, Lauren Graham told Vanity Fair that a Gilmore Girls movie is a definite possibility: "people with power, people who could actually make it happen, are talking about it." She stated the same thing in March 2013 through her Twitter account in the wake of companion show Veronica Mars earning Kickstarter funding for their film, saying it would be Sherman-Palladino's call for a film.

On June 11, 2012, while being interviewed for her new show Bunheads, creator Amy Sherman-Palladino reflected on the contract dispute and her own departure in an interview with Vulture, saying: "It was a botched negotiation. It really was about the fact that I was working too much. I was going to be the crazy person who was locked in my house and never came out. I heard a lot of 'Amy doesn't need a writing staff because she and [her husband] Dan Palladino write everything!' I thought, That's a great mentality on your part, but if you want to keep the show going for two more years, let me hire more writers. By the way, all this shit we asked for? They had to do [it] anyway when we left. They hired this big writing staff and a producer-director onstage. That's what bugged me the most. They wound up having to do what we'd asked for anyway, and I wasn't there."

In May 2015, in an interview on the Gilmore Guys podcast, Scott Patterson said: "There are talks going on at the moment. I can't really go into any detail, but there is some activity. So I'm hopeful, and you know, I'm in. [...] I think there's a lot of territory left unexplored that we could explore in a limited series or a TV movie or feature film, whatever that may be. I think it really just comes down to the script. I think everybody would jump on board." At the June 2015 ATX Television Festival in Austin, Texas, the cast reunited with creator Amy Sherman-Palladino where she told the audience, "I'm sorry, there's nothing in the works at the moment."

In October 2015, it was reported on TVLine that Netflix struck a deal with Warner Bros. to revive the series in a limited run, consisting of four 90-minute episodes. It was reported that Sherman-Palladino would be in charge of the new episodes. In April 2016, Sherman-Palladino said that the 90-minute format was inspired by the series Sherlock, of which she is a fan: "They're their own mini-movies. It felt like a format that would work well for us on a storytelling level".

On October 25, 2015, during a Wizard World Tulsa pop culture convention Q&A, Milo Ventimiglia stated, "I've always been pretty vocal about Gilmore and I know everybody's been waiting, and I was like, 'That will never happen,' and it's totally happening. While I was actually here, I got an email from the producers. Again, I'm always vocal (about producers) Amy Sherman-Palladino and Dan Palladino; they're two of my favorite people and two of my favorite writers ever of all time. Just to be able to speak their words again, of course I would do it. So I told them, yeah, of course I'll do it."

On January 29, 2016, Netflix and Warner Bros. officially confirmed the revival, tentatively titled Gilmore Girls: Seasons. Filming of the new episodes had started in Los Angeles as of February 2, 2016, and was scheduled to last until June 30, 2016, with Amy Sherman-Palladino and Daniel Palladino returning as writers and directors. On May 19, 2016, it was announced that the revival would be titled Gilmore Girls: A Year in the Life.

Producer Gavin Polone, who was involved in the original series as an executive producer with talent manager Judy Hofflund under their defunct Hofflund-Polone banner, sued Warner Bros. Television for a credit on the miniseries and additional payments for his early involvement in the original series (Hofflund retired from the business in 2013 and pursued no credits). Polone ultimately played no role in the miniseries and was uncredited when it was released. David S. Rosenthal, who took over as showrunner for Sherman-Palladino in the last season, also had no involvement in A Year in the Life.

=== Casting ===
On January 29, 2016, the day the revival was confirmed, it was reported that Lauren Graham, Alexis Bledel, Scott Patterson, Kelly Bishop, Sean Gunn, and Keiko Agena were set to return. Yanic Truesdale confirmed his return on Twitter later that day, as did David Sutcliffe. On February 1, 2016, Tanc Sade, who played Logan's friend, Finn, confirmed through his Twitter account that he would be joining the cast to reprise his role. On that same day, Aris Alvarado, who played Caesar, confirmed that he would be returning. Also on February 1, 2016, Mike Gandolfi confirmed that he was returning as Andrew in the series revival. In an interview with TVLine, Kelly Bishop confirmed that Rose Abdoo and Liza Weil would be returning for the revival. Matt Czuchry, Milo Ventimiglia, and Jared Padalecki would also return.

On February 10, 2016, Sally Struthers, Michael Winters, and Liz Torres, reprising the roles of Babette Dell, Taylor Doose, and Miss Patty LaCosta respectively, were announced as returning characters through detective work by a fan website. Carole King was also confirmed as returning to reprise her sometimes role of Sophie Bloom. Sutton Foster, from Palladino's Bunheads, was also cast. That same day, musician Grant Lee Phillips, who portrayed as a town troubadour, announced that he was reprising his role. On February 11, 2016, it was confirmed that Emily Kuroda would reprise her role as Mrs. Kim, Lane's mother, by TVLine. On the same day, Entertainment Weekly confirmed that David Sutcliffe, who played Christopher Hayden, would return for the revival as well. Danny Strong confirmed on February 11 that he, too, would be reprising his role as Doyle. Also on February 11, it was confirmed by Variety that Vanessa Marano, who played Luke's daughter, would be returning to the revival. On February 16, 2016, Sparky, the dog that played Lorelai's dog, Paul Anka, was confirmed as returning in the Netflix revival.

Babette's husband, Morey, played by Ted Rooney, was confirmed as returning on February 17. On February 19, 2016, Jackson Douglas, who played Sookie's husband, Jackson, confirmed that he would be returning to the cast to reprise his role, despite rumors that Melissa McCarthy would not be reprising her role. On February 21, 2016, Gregg Henry, who played Mitchum Huntzberger, confirmed in an interview that he would reprise his role in the series. On February 23, 2016, Alan Loayza, who played Colin McCrae, Logan's friend, confirmed that he would reprise his role via his Twitter. Nick Holmes, who played the smaller role of Robert Grimaldi, confirmed through his Twitter account that he was returning to the series on February 29, 2016.

On March 9, 2016, Biff Yeager, who played the character Tom, confirmed through his Twitter account that he would return for the Netflix revival. On March 15, 2016, Dakin Matthews, who played Chilton's headmaster, Hanlin Charleston, was confirmed as returning for his role. On March 25, 2016, John Cabrera, who played Brian Fuller in Lane's band, Hep Alien, confirmed that not only he but all four members of the band would be returning to the series, including other members Zack Van Gerbig, who was played by Todd Lowe, and Gil, who was played by rock musician Sebastian Bach. On March 29, 2016, Chris Eigeman, who played the character of Jason Stiles in season 4, announced on Twitter that he was returning in the revival. On April 7, 2016, Melissa McCarthy officially announced on The Ellen DeGeneres Show that she would be returning for the revival.

== Reception ==
Gilmore Girls: A Year in the Life received mixed to positive reviews from critics. On the review aggregator website Rotten Tomatoes, 87% of 87 critics' reviews are positive, with an average rating of 7.7/10. The website's consensus reads: "Gilmore Girls: A Year in the Life provides a faithful and successful revival of the quirky, sweet, and beloved series fans fell in love with over a decade ago." On Metacritic, the series has a score of 75 out of 100 based on 28 critics, indicating "generally favorable" reviews.

Several reviewers praised the revival for successfully recapturing the tone and character dynamics of the original series. The Guardian described it as "a beautifully wrapped gift for fans" while acknowledging that its nostalgic approach "may not convert new viewers". Vulture highlighted the chemistry between Lauren Graham and Alexis Bledel as "the emotional core" of the revival, noting that their performances "anchor even its uneven moments". The Los Angeles Review of Books wrote that the series "leans into its familiar rhythms and emotional shorthand", and that its treatment of grief and loss following the death of actor Edward Herrmann added "unexpected depth" to the revival.

Critical assessments were more mixed on the revival's structure and characterisation. Time described the series as "anachronistic", suggesting that it "feels caught between eras" and that some storylines "struggle to find relevance in a contemporary context". Screen Rant criticized Lorelai's hiking subplot as "disconnected from the series' otherwise grounded tone", arguing that it "disrupted the core ensemble dynamic". The portrayal of Rory Gilmore also drew scrutiny: a later Guardian piece called her storyline "a depressing vision of thirtysomething Rory" and criticized her lack of direction.

Collider noted that the revival "reproduced many of the original show's blind spots", particularly in its depiction of supporting characters such as Lane and Mrs. Kim. The Los Angeles Review of Books similarly commented that the series "remains uneasy with diversity and class", reflecting limitations of the original production's social perspective. Some praised the revival's emotional closure, while others criticized its ending and perceived inconsistencies in character development. Shaina Weatherhead writing in 2021 for Collider, described A Year in the Life as "a thoughtful but uneven attempt to revisit a world that may have worked best in its own time".

== Broadcast ==
The miniseries aired on The CW in November 2020 in an edited form, partly because the network needed additional programming to fill its schedule during the COVID-19 pandemic. It also aired on Up TV the same month.
