= Love and Marriage (1996 TV series) =

- Genre: Sitcom
- Created by: Amy Sherman
- Starring: Anthony Denison; Patricia Healy
- Country of origin: United States
- Original language: English
- No. of seasons: 1
- No. of episodes: 9 (6 unaired)

Production
- Executive producer: Amy Sherman
- Running time: 23 minutes
- Production companies: Dorothy Parker Drank Here Productions; TriStar Television

Original release
- Network: Fox
- Release: September 28 – October 12, 1996

Love and Marriage is an American sitcom television series starring Anthony Denison and Patricia Healy as a New York working couple trying to raise a family. The series premiered September 28, 1996, on Fox as the first series created by Amy Sherman-Palladino. The show was canceled after three episodes.

== Synopsis ==
Jack, who manages a parking garage by day, and his wife April, who works nights waitressing in a Manhattan restaurant, barely have any time to spend together, or with their three children Michael, Gemmy and Christopher. Louis and Trudy, and son Max, are their new neighbors from New Rochelle, New York.

== Cast ==
- Anthony Denison as Jack Nardini
- Patricia Healy as April Nardini
- Adam Zolotin as Christopher Nardini
- Alicia Bergman as Gemmy Nardini
- Erik Palladino as Michael Nardini
- Meagen Fay as Trudy Begg
- Michael Mantell as Louis Begg
- Adam Wylie as Max Begg
- Lisa Rieffel as Kathleen

== Episodes ==
No.	Title	Directed by	Written by	Original release date
1	"Pilot"	Robert Berlinger	Amy Sherman	September 28, 1996
2	"Look Who's Talking Now"	Max Tash	Lois Bromfield	October 5, 1996
3	"Ain't No Way to Treat a Lady"	Max Tash	Mike Martineau	October 12, 1996
4	"Up All Night"	Gail Mancuso	Henry Winkler	Unaired
5	"Here's a Case Where Thomas Wolfe Was Wrong"	Gail Mancuso	Elaine Arata	Unaired
6	"Family Business"	N/A	N/A	Unaired
7	"Back to School Fight"	Jody Margolin Hahn	N/A	Unaired
8	"Play Kristy for Me"	N/A	N/A	Unaired
9	"Sick at Home"	Jody Margolin Hahn	N/A	Unaired

== Reception ==
Howard Rosenberg of the Los Angeles Times called the series "another routine sitcom", which revolves around a "noisy family". Steven Linan, also of the Los Angeles Times, said the "uninspired sitcom could use further alterations in concept and scripts" since the show already had its title changed from Come Fly with Me. Tom Shales of The Washington Post was equally unimpressed and called the series "among the least amusing" of the new season. However, Tony Scott of Variety said "sharply written by creator Amy Sherman, directed expertly by Gail Mancuso, the Nardinis are people worth visiting". Scott further stated that the series "exudes joy, not cynicism, charm, not snideness".
