= Amy Sherman-Palladino =

American television writer, director, and producer (born 1966)

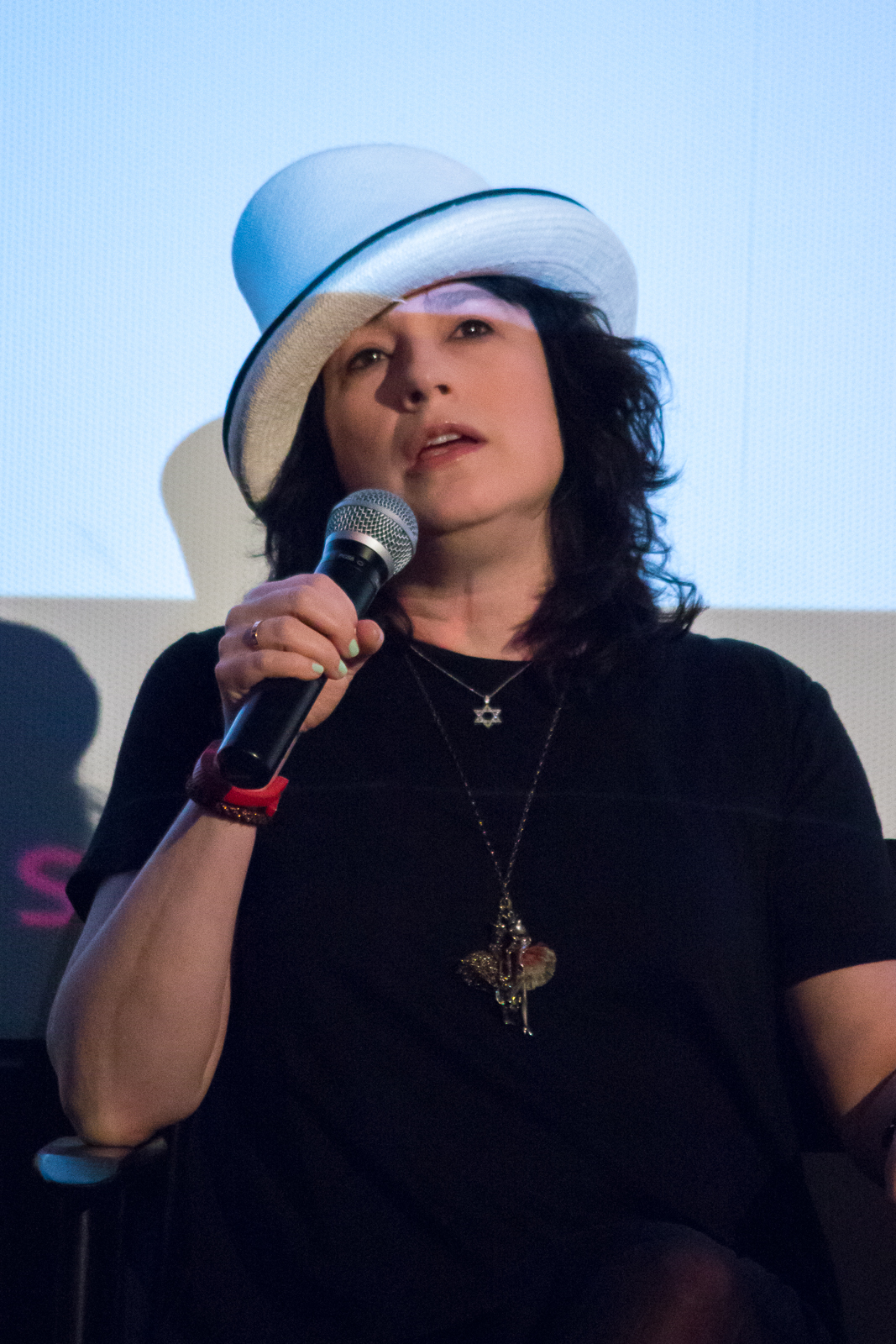
- Sherman-Palladino at the ATX TV Festival 2015 for the TV show Bunheads
- Born: Amy Sherman; January 17, 1966 (age 60); Los Angeles, California, U.S.
- Occupations: Screenwriter, director, executive producer
- Years active: 1990–present
- Notable work: Gilmore Girls; Bunheads; The Marvelous Mrs. Maisel; Étoile (TV series)
- Style: Comedy drama, screwball comedy film
- Board member of: Dorothy Parker Drank Here Productions
- Spouse: Daniel Palladino

Amy Sherman-Palladino (born January 17, 1966) is an American television writer, director, and producer. She is the creator of the comedy drama series Gilmore Girls (2000–2007), Bunheads (2012–2013), The Marvelous Mrs. Maisel (2017–2023), and Étoile (2025).

Sherman-Palladino has received six Primetime Emmy Awards for her work, including Outstanding Comedy Series, Outstanding Directing for a Comedy Series, Outstanding Writing for a Comedy Series, and Outstanding Music Supervision, all for The Marvelous Mrs. Maisel. She was the first woman to win in the comedy writing and directing categories the same year at the Primetime Emmy Awards. In 2019, she received the Norman Lear Achievement Award in Television from the Producers Guild of America.

Sherman-Palladino is the founder of Dorothy Parker Drank Here Productions. She is known for her trademark rapid-fire dialogue, which is often full of pop culture references, and as well for her preferred master shot filming style.

== Early life ==
Amy Sherman was born in Los Angeles, California. Her parents were comedian Don Sherman, who died in May 2012 (the first episode of Bunheads was dedicated to him), and dancer Maybin Hewes. Sherman was her father's stage name. Her father, from the Bronx, was Jewish, and her mother was a Southern Baptist from Gulfport, Mississippi. She has stated that she was raised "as Jewish. Sort of."

She was trained in classical ballet since she was four and took other forms of dance in her teens. Originally a trainee dancer, Sherman-Palladino had received a callback to the musical Cats, while also having a possible writing position on the staff of Roseanne in rotation. When she and writing partner Jennifer Heath were asked to join the staff of Roseanne, she left behind her dancing career — much to her mother's chagrin – and began writing for television.

== Career ==
=== 1990–1999 ===
Sherman-Palladino became a staff writer on Roseanne during the show's third season in 1990. Among the storylines and episodes she wrote was an Emmy-nominated episode about birth control.

She left the show after season six, in 1994, and worked on several other projects, including the failed 1996 sitcom Love and Marriage, the 1997 sitcom Over the Top, and writing several scripts of the NBC sitcom Veronica's Closet.

=== Gilmore Girls (2000–2006) ===
Sherman-Palladino is best known as the creator and executive producer of Gilmore Girls (2000–07), a television comedy drama series that aired initially on The WB network and concluded on its successor network, The CW. A four-episode revival aired on Netflix in 2016. In selling the show, Sherman-Palladino says that during her pitch meeting for landing a script order, Gilmore Girls was presented as a last-ditch effort thought up on the spot due to a lacking response from the network executives towards her other ideas. She presented this last hope as a "show about a mother and daughter, but they're more like best friends" and the executives were all sold immediately. During a trip to Connecticut, she and husband Daniel Palladino were inspired to center the show there, allowing a rich setting for a small-town community and the divide from the WASPy social setting of Hartford, Connecticut.

In producing the show, Sherman-Palladino and her husband wore many hats as the creative forces of the show, writing a large number of the episodes and also acting as directors, producers and showrunners for six years of its seven-year run. She took a progressive approach in creating the show with Rory having pro-choice posters throughout her college dorms and Paris protesting the unfair conditions of Burmese prisoners. Sherman-Palladino used the show as a platform for the causes that she believed in with an early focus on activism compared to similar media of the time.

==== End of working relationship with Gilmore Girls ====
On April 20, 2006, it was announced that Sherman-Palladino and her husband Daniel could not come to an agreement with The CW to continue their contracts. As a result, the Palladinos' involvement with Gilmore Girls came to an end. The official statement was as follows: "Despite our best efforts to return and ensure the future of Gilmore Girls for years to come, we were unable to reach an agreement with the studio and are therefore leaving when our contracts expire at the end of this season. Our heartfelt thanks go out to our amazing cast, hard-working crew, and loyal fans." Writer and producer David S. Rosenthal replaced them.

The couple did an interview with TV Guide writer Michael Ausiello, where they went further into their reasons for leaving the show.

In a 2012 interview with Vulture, in which Sherman-Palladino was asked to reflect on the issue, she responded

It was a botched negotiation. It really was about the fact that I was working too much. I was going to be the crazy person who was locked in my house and never came out. I heard a lot of "Amy doesn't need a writing staff because she and [her husband] Dan Palladino write everything!" I thought, "That's a great mentality on your part, but if you want to keep the show going for two more years, let me hire more writers." By the way, all this shit we asked for? They had to do anyway when we left. They hired this big writing staff and a producer-director onstage. That's what bugged me the most. They wound up having to do what we asked for anyway, and I wasn't there.

=== The Return of Jezebel James (2008) and Bunheads (2012–2013) ===
On August 1, 2006, The Hollywood Reporter announced that the Fox Network had ordered a pilot of a new comedy project from Sherman-Palladino. The untitled comedy, which received a pilot commitment from the network, was about two sisters who come together after years apart, when one of the sisters agrees to carry the other's baby. Sherman-Palladino wrote, executive produced and directed the pilot.

In December 2006, at the Hollywood Radio & Television Society's Hitmakers luncheon, Palladino revealed the name of her new sitcom: The Return of Jezebel James. The series debuted on March 14, 2008, on Fox starring Parker Posey. It was canceled on March 24, 2008, after only three episodes aired.

ABC Family picked up Sherman-Palladino's pilot, Bunheads, to series. It premiered on June 11, 2012. The series stars Sutton Foster as a Las Vegas showgirl who, after impulsively getting married, moves to the sleepy coastal town of Paradise and winds up working at her new mother-in-law's dance studio: The Paradise Dance Academy. Kelly Bishop, who portrayed Emily Gilmore in Gilmore Girls, plays the recurring role of Fanny Flowers, her mother-in-law. On July 22, 2013, five months after the end of Season 1, it was announced that Bunheads would not be renewed for a second season.

=== Gilmore Girls: A Year in the Life (2016) and The Marvelous Mrs. Maisel (2017–2023) ===
In October 2015, it was reported on TVLine that Netflix struck a deal with Warner Bros. to revive Gilmore Girls in a limited run, consisting of four 90-minute episodes. Sherman-Palladino was in charge of the new episodes, titled Gilmore Girls: A Year in the Life. The four episodes are named after the seasons, and all four became available on November 25, 2016.

In June 2016, Amazon ordered an hour-long pilot from Sherman-Palladino entitled The Marvelous Mrs. Maisel, about a 1950s housewife who decides to become one of the first female stand-up comics. On August 5, 2016, it was reported that Rachel Brosnahan had been cast in the lead role as Miriam "Midge" Maisel. Tony Shalhoub and Marin Hinkle were later cast as the parents of Brosnahan's character, Abe and Rose Weissman, with Michael Zegen joining as her husband, Joel Maisel. On March 2, 2017, Entertainment Weekly reported that Alex Borstein would be playing Susie Myerson. The Marvelous Mrs. Maisel was made available to watch on Amazon on March 17, 2017, as a part of Amazon Studios' spring pilot season, with viewers having the option to vote for it to be ordered to series. On April 10, 2017, it was announced that The Marvelous Mrs. Maisel had received an "unprecedented" two-season order from Amazon. The series was critically acclaimed; it won a Golden Globe Award for Best Television Series – Musical or Comedy at the 75th Golden Globe Awards, and a Peabody Award in "Entertainment" at the 77th Annual Peabody Awards. Sherman-Palladino won Primetime Emmy Awards for Outstanding Writing for a Comedy Series, Outstanding Directing for a Comedy Series and Outstanding Comedy Series at the 70th Primetime Emmy Awards for The Marvelous Mrs. Maisel. The success led to an overall deal at Amazon Studios. Its final season premiered in 2023.

=== 2023–present ===
Sherman-Palladino's subsequent series Étoile about ballet companies in New York and Paris premiered on Amazon in 2025, and was cancelled after one season, despite originally having been ordered for two seasons. In August 2025, it was reported that a film version of Eloise written by Sherman-Palladino was casting for the title role. In February 2026, it was reported that Sherman-Palladino was tapped to write and direct a feature film adaptation of Jennifer Weiner’s novel The Griffin Sisters’ Greatest Hits for Universal Pictures

== Personal life ==
Sherman-Palladino is married to Daniel Palladino, who has served as co-executive producer, writer, and director on many of her shows.

== Dialogue and style ==
Dialogue in Sherman-Palladino's work involves heavy use of pop culture references, delivered in a fast repartee, screwball-comedy style. Palladino is also very particular with her selection and use of music in her work. In an interview with OutSmart magazine, she explained how lazy and instructional its use is on most television shows:

I think music on television is just uniformly dreadful. It is mundane, it says nothing. They use it to say, "Here's a funny moment!" ... you know? It's not an extension of the drama, it's distraction. It's like, "I'll distract you, so you won't know how shitty the show is...like a laugh track. That, to me, is what music on television is. They score everything from beginning to end so that after a while the music is just like white noise. It's not giving it its due, its place. Everything has its place. Shows would go by, and we wouldn't put a lot of music in because to me the music was an extension of the drama, so if you just throw it in under everything, it's like throwing a washing-machine sound effect in there, it's not the point of it. It's like having two characters have a long, not very interesting discussion for no other reason except to fill up screen time.

== Influences ==
She has cited comedians Erma Bombeck, Woody Allen, Mel Brooks, Joan Rivers, Elaine May, and Norman Lear as influences. She has cited Barbra Streisand, Stephen Sondheim, Tony Kushner, Carole King, and Bob Fosse as pop culture inspirations. She has also expressed her love of classic musicals such as Easter Parade (1948), Singin' in the Rain (1952), and The Band Wagon (1953).

== Bibliography ==
- Gilmore Girls: The Other Side of Summer by Amy Sherman-Palladino and Helen Pai (2002, ISBN 0-06-050916-3)

== Credits ==
=== Television ===
Year	Title	Writer	Director	Executive producer	Notes
1990	City	1 ep.	No	No	
1990–1994	Roseanne	13 ep.	No	36 ep.	
1995	Can't Hurry Love	3 ep.	No	No	
1996	Love and Marriage	5 ep.	No	Yes	Also creator
1997	Over the Top	1 ep.	No	12 ep.	As consulting producer
1998–1999	Veronica's Closet	2 ep.	No	Yes	Executive producer
2000–2007	Gilmore Girls	52 ep.	15 ep.	Yes	Also creator
2008	The Return of Jezebel James	4 ep.	2. ep.	Yes	Also creator
2010	The Wyoming Story	Yes	Yes	Yes	Pilot
2012–2013	Bunheads	8 ep.	5 ep.	Yes	Also creator
2016	Gilmore Girls: A Year in the Life	2 ep.	2 ep.	Yes	Also creator
2017–2023	The Marvelous Mrs. Maisel	23 ep.	21 ep.	Yes	Also creator
2025	Étoile	Yes	Yes	Yes	Also creator

=== Film ===
Year	Title	Writer	Director	Producer	Notes
TBA	Eloise	Yes	Yes	No	Post-production
