= Sutton Foster discography =

- Studio albums: 2
- Live albums: 1
- Cast recordings: 8

This is a list of recordings by actress and singer Sutton Foster.

== Albums ==
- Wish, 2009, Ghostlight Records (solo debut album)
- An Evening with Sutton Foster: Live at the Café Carlyle, 2011, Ghostlight Records
- Take Me to the World, 2018

== Cast albums ==
- The Scarlet Pimpernel (original Broadway cast recording),1998
- Thoroughly Modern Millie (original Broadway cast recording), 2002
- Little Women (original Broadway cast recording), 2005
- The Drowsy Chaperone (original Broadway cast recording), 2006
- Young Frankenstein (original Broadway cast recording), 2007
- Shrek the Musical (original Broadway cast recording), 2009
- Anything Goes (2nd Broadway revival cast recording), 2011
  - Grammy Award nomination for Best Musical Theatre Album
- Violet (original Broadway cast recording), 2014
- The Music Man (2nd Broadway revival cast recording), 2022
- Diary of a Wimpy Kid: The Musical (Studio Cast Recording), 2023
- Once Upon a Mattress, (2nd Broadway revival cast recording), 2024

== Featured recordings ==
- Jule Styne in Hollywood
- The Maury Yeston Songbook
- Keys - The Music of Scott Alan
- A Merry Little Christmas, 2018
