= I'm Beginning to See the Light (Buck Hill album) =

Studio album by Buck Hill
- Released: 1992
- Recorded: June 12, 1991
- Studio: Sound On Sound Recording, New York, NY
- Genre: Jazz
- Length: 49:53
- Label: Muse; MCD 5449
- Producer: Houston Person

Buck Hill chronology
The Buck Stops Here (1992)	I'm Beginning to See the Light (1992)	Impulse (1995)

I'm Beginning to See the Light is an album by saxophonist Buck Hill, which was recorded in 1991 and released on the Muse label.

== Reception ==
Professional ratings
Review scores
Source	Rating
AllMusic	4/5 stars

The AllMusic review by Scott Yanow stated, "A thick-toned tenor, Hill has a boppish style and looks both toward swing and hard bop simultaneously. Joined by a fine, if obscure, Washington-based rhythm section, Hill performs five of his originals and four standards on this date ... an excellent example of Hill's musical talents."

== Track listing ==
All compositions by Buck Hill except where noted

1. "Blue Hill" – 3:53
2. "Lullaby of Loosdrecht" – 7:52
3. "Mitzi" – 4:32
4. "Bossa for Sax" – 8:55
5. "I'm Beginning to See the Light" (Duke Ellington, Don George, Johnny Hodges, Harry James) – 5:16
6. "But Beautiful" (Jimmy Van Heusen, Johnny Burke) – 8:25
7. "I Want to Be Happy" (Vincent Youmans, Irving Caesar) – 3:26
8. "Warm Valley" (Ellington) – 3:26
9. "Blues in Five for Four or More" – 4:08

== Personnel ==
- Buck Hill – tenor saxophone
- Jon Ozment – piano
- Carroll Dashiell – bass
- Warren Shadd – drums
