= An Evening with Sutton Foster =

Live album by Sutton Foster
- Released: March 15, 2011
- Genre: Vocal
- Label: Ghostlight

Sutton Foster chronology
Wish (2009)	An Evening with Sutton Foster (2011)

An Evening with Sutton Foster: Live at the Café Carlyle is the second solo album and the first live album of actress and singer Sutton Foster, released through Ghostlight Records on March 15, 2011, recorded during her "An Evening with Sutton Foster" tour (2010–11).

== Track listing ==
1. "I'm Beginning to See the Light" by Duke Ellington, Don George, Johnny Hodges, and Harry James
2. Dialog #1- Introductions
3. "Not for the Life of Me" from Thoroughly Modern Millie/"NYC" from Annie/"Astonishing" from Little Women
4. Dialog #2- "Up on the Roof" Intro
5. "Up on the Roof" by Carole King and Gerry Goffin
6. "Air Conditioner" by Christine Lavin
7. "Warm All Over" from The Most Happy Fella
8. Dialog #3- Angel Cards
9. "Show Off" from The Drowsy Chaperone
10. "More to the Story" from Shrek (cut from the show)
11. "My Heart Was Set on You" by Jeff Blumenkrantz
12. "Down with Love" from Hooray for What!
13. "I Like the Sunrise" by Duke Ellington
14. Dialog #4- Ho Cup Surprise
15. "Defying Gravity" from Wicked
16. "The Late, Late Show" by Dave Cavanaugh and Roy Alfred
17. Dialog #5- Jeopardy
18. "Sunshine on My Shoulders" by John Denver
19. "Anyone Can Whistle" from Anyone Can Whistle/"Being Alive" from Company
20. Dialog #6- Thank Yous
21. "Come the Wild, Wild Weather" by Noël Coward
22. "Here, There and Everywhere" by John Lennon & Paul McCartney
23. Dialog #7- Encore
24. "And I Am Telling You I'm Not Going" from Dreamgirls

== Reception ==
Professional ratings
Review scores
Source	Rating
AllMusic	3.5/5 stars

The album received generally positive reviews from consumers and critics alike, and has 4.8 out of 5 stars on Amazon. Stephen Holden said, "The radiance of Julia Roberts and the zany spunk of Holly Golightly: that only begins to describe the seductive charms of Sutton Foster in her irresistible cabaret show, An Evening With Sutton Foster."

== Personnel ==
- Vocals – Sutton Foster
- Arrangements – Michael Rafter
- Musical Director – Michael Rafter
- Piano – Michael Rafter
- Guitar – Kevin Kuhn
