= List of awards and nominations received by Sutton Foster =

Sutton Foster awards and nominations
Awards and nominations
Award	Wins	Nominations
Tony Awards	2	7
Critics' Choice Awards	0	2
Grammy Awards	0	1
Laurence Olivier Awards	0	1

Totals (Note: Certain award groups do not simply award one winner. They acknowledge several different recipients, have runners-up, and have third place. Since this is a specific recognition and is different from losing an award, runner-up mentions are considered wins in this award tally. For simplification and to avoid errors, each award in this list has been presumed to have had a prior nomination.)
- Wins: 2
- Nominations: 11

The following is a list of awards and nominations received by actress Sutton Foster.

Foster is an actress known for her extensive work on the Broadway stage. She has received seven Tony Award nominations, receiving two wins for her performance in Thoroughly Modern Millie in 2003 and Anything Goes in 2011. She has also earned Grammy Award and Laurence Olivier Award nominations for Anything Goes.

== Theater ==
Sources:PlaybillVault Internet Broadway Database BroadwayWorld

Note: The year given is the year of the ceremony

=== Grammy Awards ===
Year	Category	Nominated work	Result	Ref.
2012	Best Musical Theater Album	Anything Goes	Nominated	

=== Tony Awards ===
Year	Category	Nominated work	Result	Ref.
2002	Best Actress in a Musical	Thoroughly Modern Millie	Won	
2005	Best Actress in a Musical	Little Women	Nominated	
2006	Best Actress in a Musical	The Drowsy Chaperone	Nominated	
2009	Best Actress in a Musical	Shrek The Musical	Nominated	
2011	Best Actress in a Musical	Anything Goes	Won	
2014	Best Actress in a Musical	Violet	Nominated	
2022	Best Actress in a Musical	The Music Man	Nominated	

=== Drama Desk Awards ===
Year	Category	Nominated work	Result	Ref.
2002	Outstanding Actress in a Musical	Thoroughly Modern Millie	Won	
2005	Outstanding Actress in a Musical	Little Women	Nominated	
2006	Outstanding Actress in a Musical	The Drowsy Chaperone	Nominated	
2009	Outstanding Actress in a Musical	Shrek The Musical	Nominated	
2011	Outstanding Actress in a Musical	Anything Goes	Won	
2014	Outstanding Actress in a Musical	Violet	Nominated	
2017	Outstanding Actress in a Musical	Sweet Charity	Nominated	
2025	Outstanding Lead Performance in a Musical	Once Upon a Mattress	Nominated	

=== Drama League Awards ===
Year	Category	Nominated work	Result	Ref.
2002	Distinguished Performance	Thoroughly Modern Millie	Nominated	
2005	Distinguished Performance	Little Women	Nominated	
2006	Distinguished Performance	The Drowsy Chaperone	Nominated	
2008	Distinguished Performance	Young Frankenstein	Nominated	
2009	Distinguished Performance	Shrek The Musical	Nominated	
2011	Distinguished Performance	Anything Goes	Nominated	
2014	Distinguished Performance	Violet	Nominated	
2017	Distinguished Performance	Sweet Charity	Nominated	
2022	Distinguished Performance	The Music Man	Won	

=== Outer Critics Circle Awards ===
Year	Category	Nominated work	Result	Ref.
2002	Outstanding Actress in a Musical	Thoroughly Modern Millie	Won	
2005	Outstanding Actress in a Musical	Little Women	Nominated	
2006	Outstanding Actress in a Musical	The Drowsy Chaperone	Nominated	
2009	Outstanding Actress in a Musical	Shrek The Musical	Won	
2011	Outstanding Actress in a Musical	Anything Goes	Won	
2014	Outstanding Actress in a Musical	Violet	Nominated	

=== Laurence Olivier Awards ===
Year	Category	Nominated work	Result	Ref.
2022	Best Actress in a Musical	Anything Goes	Nominated	

=== Miscellaneous awards ===
Year	Association	Category	Nominated work	Result
2002	Astaire Award	Best Female Dancer	Thoroughly Modern Millie	Won
2002	Broadway.com Audience Awards	Favorite Actress in a Musical	Thoroughly Modern Millie	Won
2002	Broadway.com Audience Awards	Favorite Breakthrough Performance (Female)	Thoroughly Modern Millie	Won
2005	Broadway.com Audience Awards	Favorite Actress in a Musical	Little Women	Won
2005	Broadway.com Audience Awards	Favorite Diva Performance	Little Women	Won
2006	Broadway.com Audience Awards	Favorite Actress in a Musical	The Drowsy Chaperone	Nominated
2006	Broadway.com Audience Awards	Favorite Diva Performance	The Drowsy Chaperone	Nominated
2006	Broadway.com Audience Awards	Favorite Ensemble Performance	The Drowsy Chaperone	Nominated
2008	Broadway.com Audience Awards	Favorite Onstage Pair (shared with Roger Bart)	Young Frankenstein	Won
2008	Broadway.com Audience Awards	Favorite Featured Actress in a Musical	Young Frankenstein	Nominated
2009	Broadway.com Audience Awards	Favorite Onstage Pair (shared with Brian d'Arcy James)	Shrek The Musical	Nominated
2009	Broadway.com Audience Awards	Favorite Actress in a Musical	Shrek The Musical	Nominated
2009	Broadway.com Audience Awards	Favorite Diva Performance	Shrek The Musical	Won
2011	Broadway.com Audience Awards	Favorite Actress in a Musical	Anything Goes	Won
2011	Broadway.com Audience Awards	Favorite Diva Performance	Anything Goes	Nominated
2011	Broadway.com Audience Awards	Favorite Onstage Pair (shared with Joel Grey)	Anything Goes	Nominated
2011	Astaire Award	Best Dancer on Broadway	Anything Goes	Won
2014	Broadway.com Audience Awards	Favorite Actress in a Musical	Violet	Nominated
2017	Lucille Lortel Award	Outstanding Lead Actress in a Musical	Sweet Charity	Nominated
2022	Broadway.com Audience Awards	Favorite Actress in a Musical	The Music Man	Won
2022	Broadway.com Audience Awards	Onstage Pair (shared with Hugh Jackman)	The Music Man	Won
2024	Broadway.com Audience Awards	Favorite Replacement (Female)	Sweeney Todd: The Demon Barber of Fleet Street	Won
2025	Broadway.com Audience Awards	Favorite Funny Performance	Once Upon a Mattress	Nominated

== Television awards ==
=== Critics' Choice Awards ===
Year	Category	Nominated work	Result
Critics' Choice Television Awards
2013	Best Actress in a Comedy Series	Bunheads	Nominated
2018	Best Actress in a Comedy Series	Younger	Nominated

=== Miscellaneous awards ===
Year	Association	Category	Nominated work	Result
2012	Teen Choice Awards	Choice TV Actress: Breakout	Bunheads	Nominated
2013	Gracie Awards	Outstanding Female Actor in a Breakthrough Role	Bunheads	Won
2016	Women's Image Network Awards	Best Actress in a Comedy Series	Younger	Nominated
2017	Women's Image Network Awards	Best Actress in a Comedy Series	Younger	Nominated
2019	Boston Conservatory at Berklee	Honorary Doctorate		Won
