= Buck Hill (musician) =

American musician (1927–2017)

- Birth name: Roger Wendell Hill
- Born: February 13, 1927; Washington, D.C., U.S.
- Died: March 20, 2017 (aged 90); Greenbelt, Maryland, U.S.
- Genres: Jazz
- Occupation(s): Musician, composer
- Instrument(s): Saxophone, clarinet

Roger Wendell "Buck" Hill (February 13, 1927 – March 20, 2017) was an American jazz tenor and soprano saxophonist.

Hill began playing professionally in 1943 but held a day job as a mailman in his birthplace of Washington, D.C. for over forty years. He recorded with Charlie Byrd in 1958–59. Hill released his first record as a leader, This Is Buck Hill, in 1978. During the 1970s, he also recorded two albums with the Washington-area trumpeter Allan Houser. Hill's albums for SteepleChase and Muse included appearances by Kenny Barron, Buster Williams, Barry Harris, Ray Drummond, Kenny Washington, and Johnny Coles, among others. He released his last album in 2006.

== Personal life ==
Hill attended Armstrong High School in Washington D.C., where he played in a band with fellow saxophone player Charlie Rouse. He served in the U.S. Army in the mid-1940s, playing in Army bands. In 1949, he married Helen Weaver, with whom he raised three children. As a mainstay in the capitol's jazz community, he mentored other jazz musicians including Billy Hart, and he sat in with touring musicians, but he preferred not to travel away from home and family for gigs.

Hill began working for the U.S. Postal Service in the 1950 to support his family. Though he left his job at the post office in 1955, he returned in 1960 and continued to work there until his retirement in 1998. On August 27, 2019, two years after Hill's death, a mural featuring Hill playing a saxophone in his mail carrier's uniform was unveiled. The mural, at just over 70 feet, was reportedly the tallest portrait mural in the nation's capital. It was painted by Tucson, AZ artist Joe Pagac and was sponsored by the District of Columbia Department of Public Works' MuralsDC project. At the unveiling ceremony, Washington, DC Mayor Muriel Bowser declared “Roger Wendell Buck Hill Day” in the city. It was not Hill's first time being honored by the city; in 1982, then-mayor Marion Barry declared October 9 to be "Buck Hill Day".

Hill died March 20, 2017, at his home in Greenbelt, Maryland, at the age of 90.

== Discography ==
=== As leader ===
- This Is Buck Hill (SteepleChase, 1978)
- Scope (SteepleChase, 1979)
- Easy to Love (SteepleChase, 1982)
- Impressions (SteepleChase, 1983)
- Buck Hill Plays Europe (Turning Point, 1982)
- Capital Hill (Muse, 1989)
- The Buck Stops Here (Muse, 1990)
- I'm Beginning to See the Light (Muse, 1991)
- Impulse (Muse, 1992)
- Uh Huh! Buck Hill, Live at Montpelier! (Jazzmont, 2000)
- Relax (Severn, 2006)

=== As sideman ===
With Charlie Byrd

- Byrd's Word! (Riverside, 1958)
- Byrd in the Wind (Riverside, 1959)

With Shirley Horn

- Close Enough for Love (Verve, 1989)
- You Won't Forget Me (Verve, 1991)
- The Main Ingredient (Verve, 1995)
- I Remember Miles (Verve, 1998)

With Shirley Scott

- Great Scott! (Muse, 1991)
