= This Is Buck Hill =

Studio album by Buck Hill Quartet
- Released: 1978
- Recorded: March 20, 1978
- Studio: New York City
- Genre: Jazz
- Length: 55:55 CD release with additional track
- Label: SteepleChase; SCS 1095/SCCD 31095
- Producer: Nils Winther

Buck Hill chronology
This Is Buck Hill (1978)	Scope (1979)

This Is Buck Hill is the debut album by saxophonist Buck Hill which was recorded in 1978 and released on the SteepleChase label.

== Reception ==
Professional ratings
Review scores
Source	Rating
AllMusic	4/5 stars

The AllMusic review by Scott Yanow stated "Hill received some initial publicity because of his unusual situation, being a mailman during the day and a part-time player at night. However, he certainly sounds like a world-class post-bop player on this date ... Recommended".

== Track listing ==
All compositions by Buck Hill except where noted

1. "Toku Do" (Buster Williams) – 8:46
2. "Yesterdays" (Jerome Kern, Otto Harbach) – 9:34
3. "Oleo" (Sonny Rollins) – 5:11
4. "I'm Aquarius" – 6:54
5. "S.M.Y." – 7:42
6. "Two Chord Molly" – 10:23
7. "S.M.Y." [take 2] – 7:16 Additional track on CD release

== Personnel ==
- Buck Hill – tenor saxophone
- Kenny Barron – piano
- Buster Williams – bass
- Billy Hart – drums
