= Scope (album) =

Studio album by Buck Hill Quartet
- Released: 1979
- Recorded: July 8, 1979
- Studio: New York City
- Genre: Jazz
- Length: 46:43 CD release with additional track
- Label: SteepleChase; SCS 1123/SCCD 31123
- Producer: Nils Winther

Buck Hill chronology
This Is Buck Hill (1978)	Scope (1979)	Easy to Love (1982)

Scope is an album by saxophonist Buck Hill which was recorded in 1979 and released on the SteepleChase label.

== Reception ==
Professional ratings
Review scores
Source	Rating
AllMusic	4.5/5 stars

The AllMusic review by Scott Yanow stated "The tunes are mostly challenging, not being based on bop standards, and clearly inspired the musicians. Hill is heard in top form throughout the underrated but superior session".

== Track listing ==
All compositions by Buck Hill except where noted

1. "Scope" – 5:54
2. "Ballad Repeter" – 6:14
3. "Little Bossa" – 7:19
4. "Beast Beautiful" – 5:37
5. "The Sad Ones" – 8:13
6. "Funk Dumplin" – 5:56
7. "Snaps" (Buster Williams) – 7:26 Additional track on CD release

== Personnel ==
- Buck Hill – tenor saxophone
- Kenny Barron – piano
- Buster Williams – bass
- Billy Hart – drums
