= Impressions (Buck Hill album) =

Live album by Buck Hill Quartet
- Released: 1983
- Recorded: July 10, 11 & 12, 1981
- Venue: North Sea Jazz Festival, Den Haag, Netherlands
- Genre: Jazz
- Length: 49:28 CD release with additional track
- Label: SteepleChase; SCS 1173/SCCD 31173
- Producer: Nils Winther

Buck Hill chronology
Easy to Love (1982)	Impressions (1983)	Capital Hill (1990)

Impressions is a live album by saxophonist Buck Hill which was recorded at the North Sea Jazz Festival in 1981 and released on the SteepleChase label.

== Reception ==
Professional ratings
Review scores
Source	Rating
AllMusic	3/5 stars

The AllMusic review by Scott Yanow stated "This particular LP, recorded at the same Northsea Jazz Festival that had already resulted in Easy to Love, features Hill in 1981 leading a quartet ... The solos of Hill and Brown are excellent if not overly memorable, and the results are pleasing and swinging while being a little explorative in spots".

== Track listing ==
1. "Alone Together" (Arthur Schwartz, Howard Dietz) – 9:05
2. "Penn Station" (Reuben Brown) – 10:50
3. "Yesterdays" (Jerome Kern, Otto Harbach) – 11:58
4. "Impressions" (John Coltrane) – 8:45
5. "Spaces" (Brown) – 7:54 Additional track on CD release

== Personnel ==
- Buck Hill – tenor saxophone
- Reuben Brown – piano
- Wilbur Little – bass
- Billy Hart – drums
