= The Buck Stops Here (album) =

Studio album by Buck Hill
- Released: 1992
- Recorded: April 13, 1990
- Studio: Van Gelder Studio, Englewood Cliffs, NJ
- Genre: Jazz
- Length: 52:09
- Label: Muse; MCD 5416
- Producer: Houston Person

Buck Hill chronology
Capital Hill (1990)	The Buck Stops Here (1992)	I'm Beginning to See the Light (1992)

The Buck Stops Here is an album by saxophonist Buck Hill which was recorded in 1990 and released on the Muse label.

== Reception ==
Professional ratings
Review scores
Source	Rating
AllMusic	4/5 stars

The AllMusic review by Les Line stated "he shares the solo spotlight with the rarely recorded Johnny Coles, who seldom plays a superfluous note on his warm-voiced flugelhorn. This is a nicely balanced set of pretty ballads and jaunty originals".

== Track listing ==
1. "Someone Like That in Your Life" (Buck Hill, Chips Bayen) – 5:24
2. "I've Grown Accustomed to Her Face" (Frederick Loewe, Alan Jay Lerner) – 6:36
3. "Breaks" (Hill) – 7:11
4. "Harlem Nocturne" (Earle Hagen, Dick Rogers) – 6:25
5. "Wip Wap" (Johnny Coles) – 6:05
6. "You Don't Know What Love Is" (Gene de Paul, Don Raye) – 8:53
7. "R H Blues" (Hill) – 3:41
8. "I Don't Stand a Ghost of a Chance with You" (Victor Young, Ned Washington, Bing Crosby) – 7:54

== Personnel ==
- Buck Hill – tenor saxophone
- Johnny Coles – flugelhorn
- Barry Harris – piano
- Ray Drummond – bass
- Kenny Washington – drums
