= Wish (Sutton Foster album) =

Studio album by Sutton Foster
- Released: February 17, 2009
- Genre: Vocal
- Label: Ghostlight

Sutton Foster chronology
Wish (2009)	An Evening with Sutton Foster (2011)

Wish is the debut album by actress and singer Sutton Foster, released through Ghostlight Records on February 17, 2009.

== Track listing ==
1. "I'm Beginning to See the Light" by Duke Ellington, Don George, Johnny Hodges, and Harry James
2. "Warm All Over"
3. "The Late, Late Show"
4. "Up on the Roof" by Carole King and Gerry Goffin
5. "My Romance/Danglin" from Jumbo
6. "I Like the Sunrise"
7. "Air Conditioner"
8. "Sunshine on My Shoulders" by John Denver
9. "My Heart Was Set on You"
10. "Flight"
11. "Once Upon a Time"
12. "Nobody's Cryin"
13. "Come the Wild, Wild Weather"
14. "On My Way" from Violet
15. "Oklahoma" from Oklahoma!

== Reception ==
Professional ratings
Review scores
Source	Rating
AllMusic	3.5/5 stars

Dick Scanlan described the album by saying "If the song list is eclectic, so is the singer. You know that magical quality of morning light after a night of torrential downpour? Redemptive. Pure. Joyful, but a joy hard-won by having survived the rain."

== Promotion ==
Broadway.com released two behind-the-scenes videos of the making of the album, and although Foster was unable to tour due to prior commitment to her role in Shrek on Broadway, she did hold a concert at the Rose Theater to help promote the album.
