= Easy to Love (Buck Hill album) =

Live album by Buck Hill Quartet
- Released: 1982
- Recorded: July 11 & 12, 1981
- Venue: North Sea Jazz Festival, Den Haag, Netherlands
- Genre: Jazz
- Length: 49:18 CD release with additional track
- Label: SteepleChase; SCS 1160/SCCD 31160
- Producer: Nils Winther

Buck Hill chronology
Scope (1979)	Easy to Love (1982)	Impressions (1983)

Easy to Love is a live album by saxophonist Buck Hill which was recorded at the North Sea Jazz Festival in 1981 and released on the SteepleChase label.

Professional ratings
Review scores
Source	Rating
AllMusic	4/5 stars

== Track listing ==
All compositions by Reuben Brown except where noted

1. "Easy to Love" (Cole Porter) – 9:41
2. "Little Face" – 9:36
3. "Mr. Barrow" – 7:57
4. "Spaces" – 7:03
5. "Brakes" (Buck Hill) – 6:54
6. "Two Chord Molly" (Hill) – 8:03 Additional track on CD release

== Personnel ==
- Buck Hill – tenor saxophone
- Reuben Brown – piano
- Wilbur Little – bass
- Billy Hart – drums
