= Impulse (Buck Hill album) =

Studio album by Buck Hill
- Released: 1995
- Recorded: July 24, 1992
- Studio: Van Gelder Studio, Englewood Cliffs, NJ
- Genre: Jazz
- Length: 54:38
- Label: Muse; MCD 5483
- Producer: Houston Person

Buck Hill chronology
I'm Beginning to See the Light (1992)	Impulse (1995)	Uh-Huh! Buck Hill, Live at Montpelier! (2000)

Impulse is an album by saxophonist Buck Hill which was recorded in 1992 and released on the Muse label.

== Reception ==
Professional ratings
Review scores
Source	Rating
AllMusic	4.5/5 stars

The AllMusic review by Scott Yanow stated "the veteran tenor saxophonist is heard in peak form. This particularly well-rounded set has many high points".

== Track listing ==
All compositions by Buck Hill except where noted

1. "Blues in the Closet" (Oscar Pettiford) – 5:31
2. "You Taught My Heart to Sing" (McCoy Tyner, Sammy Cahn) – 4:22
3. "Random Walk" – 4:57
4. "Impulse" – 6:14
5. "In a Sentimental Mood" (Duke Ellington, Manny Kurtz, Irving Mills) – 6:28
6. "Sweet Georgia Brown" (Ben Bernie, Maceo Pinkard, Kenneth Casey) – 6:03
7. "Solitude" (Ellington, Eddie DeLange, Mills) – 5:57
8. "Ottowa Bash" – 6:28
9. "How Do You Keep the Music Playing?" (Michel Legrand, Alan Bergman, Marilyn Bergman) – 4:08
10. "Now's the Time" (Charlie Parker) – 4:30

== Personnel ==
- Buck Hill – tenor saxophone, clarinet
- Jon Ozment – piano
- Carroll V. Dashiell, Jr. – bass
- Warren Shadd – drums
