= 3rd Critics' Choice Television Awards =

2013 American television awards ceremony

- Date: June 10, 2013
- Location: The Beverly Hilton, Los Angeles
- Country: United States
- Presented by: Broadcast Television Journalists Association
- Hosted by: Retta

Highlights
- Most awards: The Big Bang Theory (3)
- Most nominations: American Horror Story: Asylum; The Big Bang Theory (6)
- Best Comedy Series: The Big Bang Theory
- Best Drama Series: Breaking Bad; Game of Thrones
- Website: www.criticschoice.com

The 3rd Critics' Choice Television Awards ceremony, presented by the Broadcast Television Journalists Association (BTJA), honored the best in primetime television programming from June 1, 2012, to May 31, 2013, and was held on June 10, 2013, at The Beverly Hilton in Los Angeles, California. The nominations were announced on May 22, 2013. The ceremony was hosted by comedian and actress Retta, and was live-streamed on Ustream. Bob Newhart received the Critics' Choice Television Icon Award.

== Winners and nominees ==
Winners are listed first and highlighted in boldface:

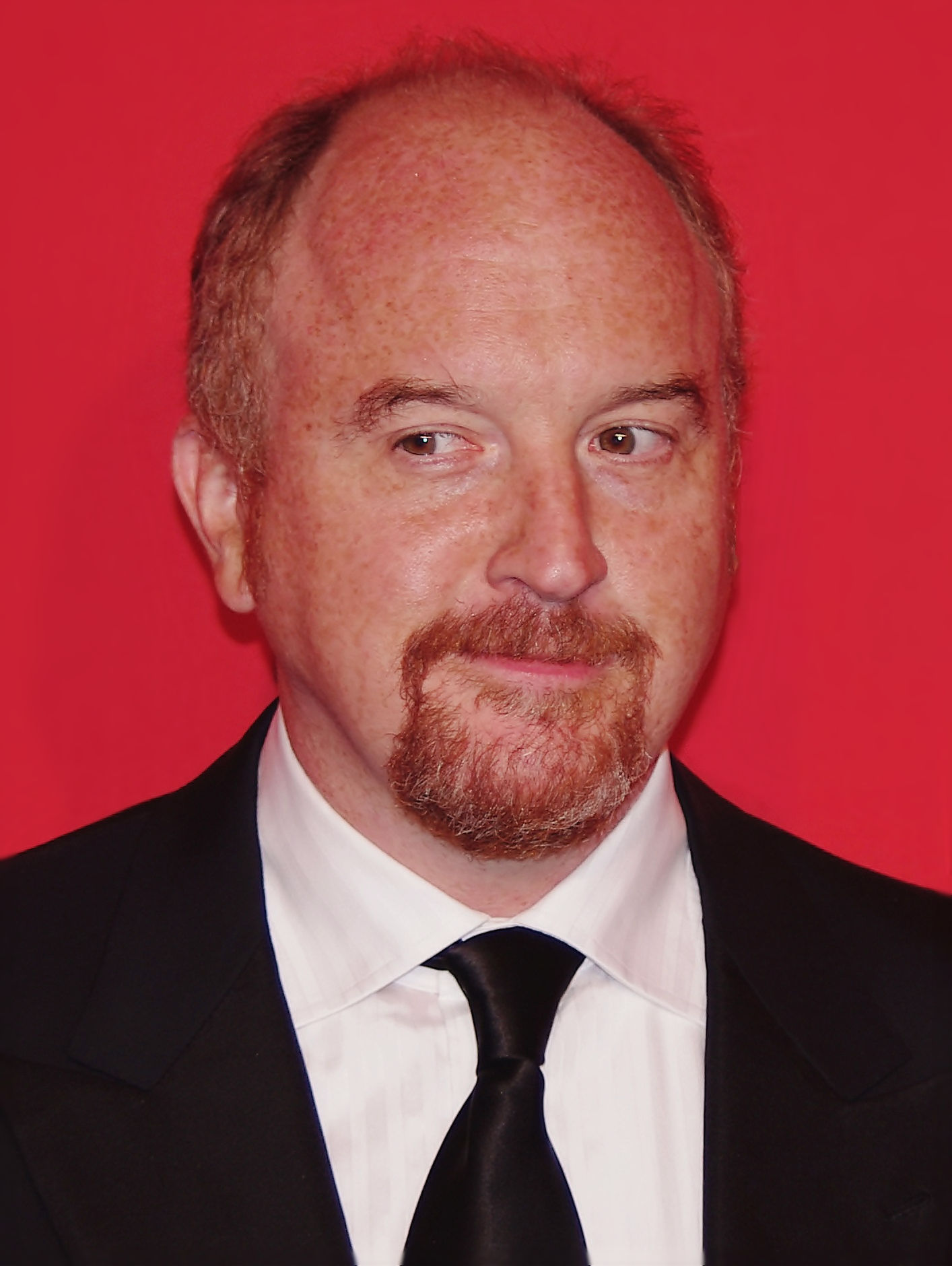
Louis C.K., Best Actor in a Comedy Series winner

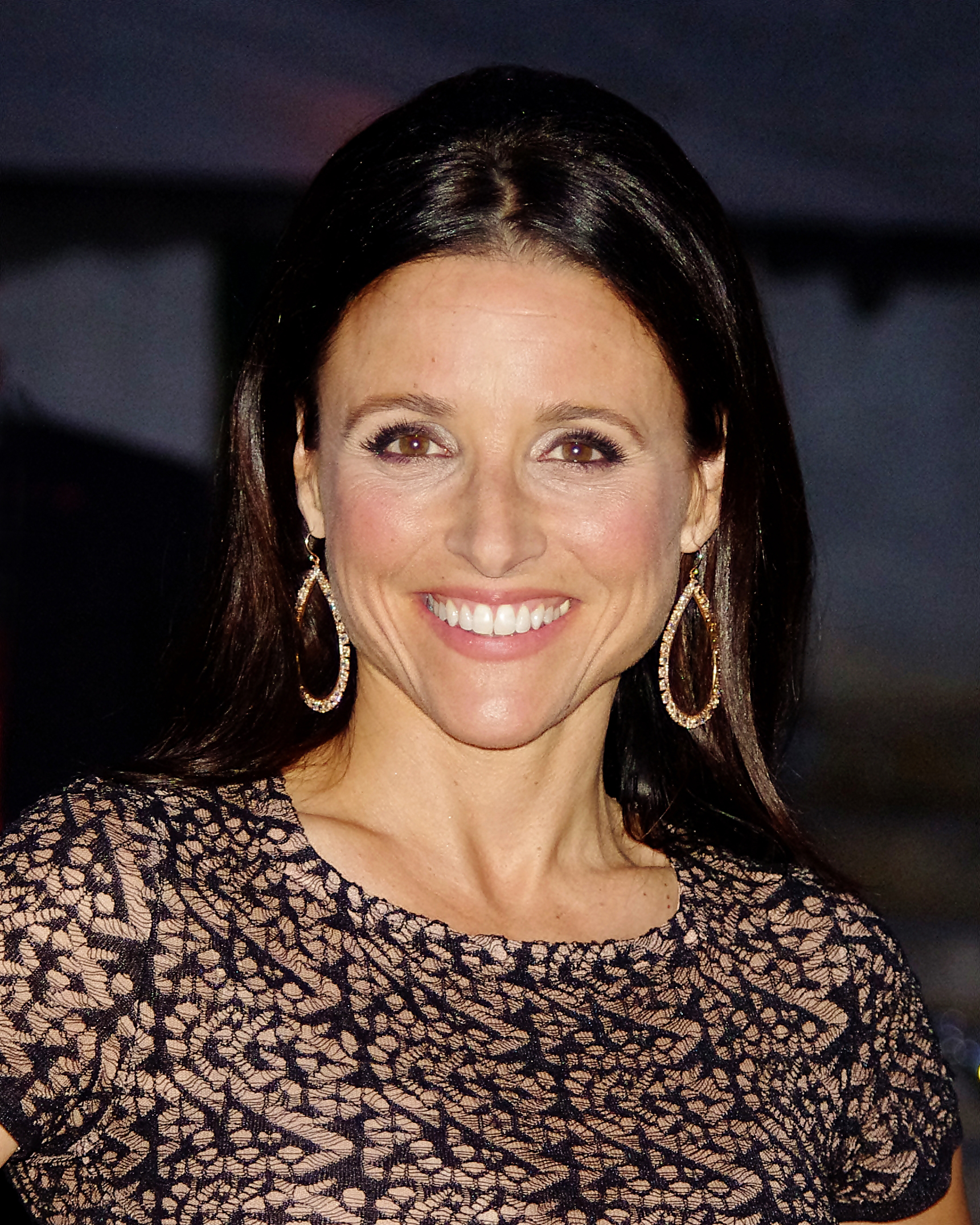
Julia Louis-Dreyfus, Best Actress in a Comedy Series winner

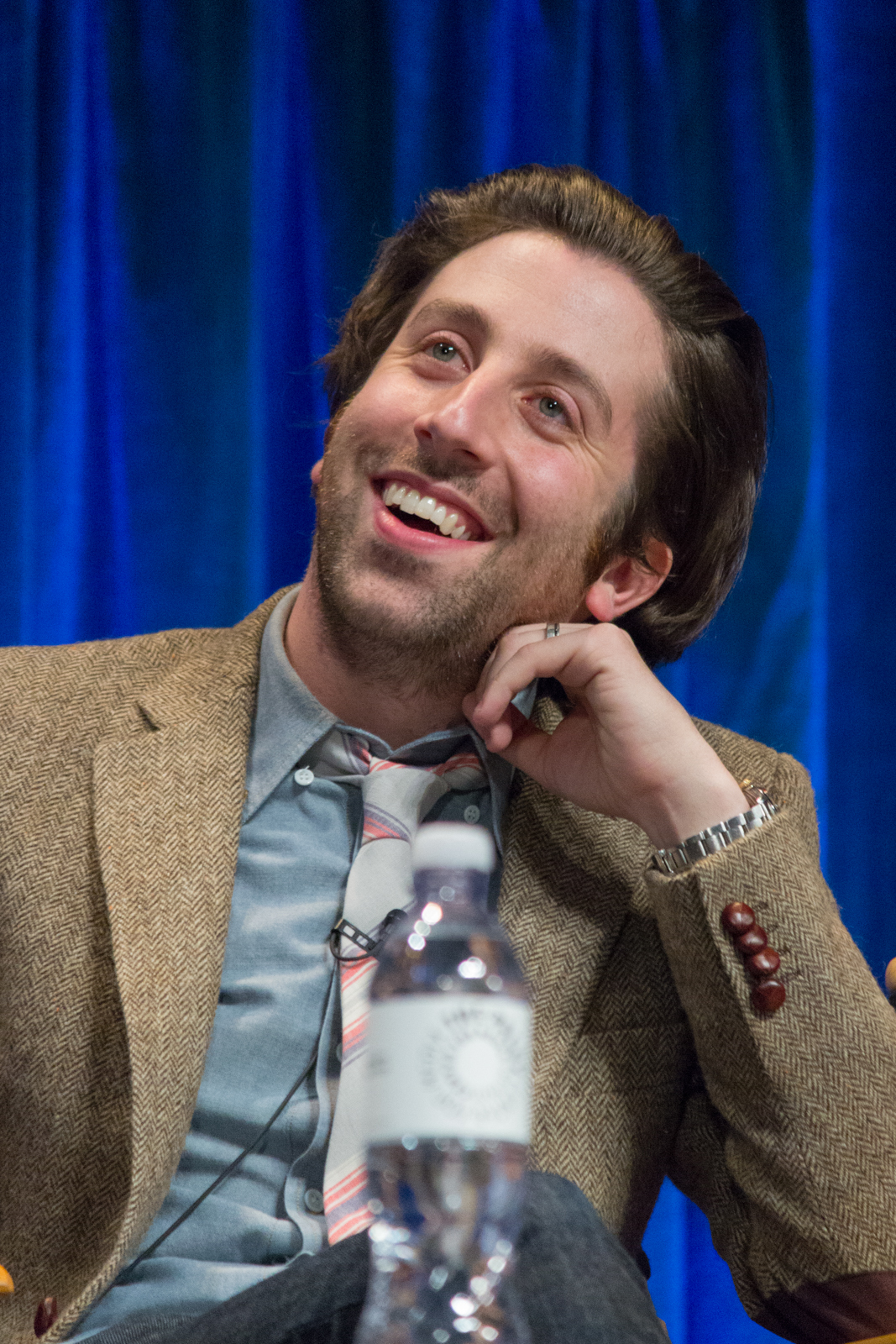
Simon Helberg, Best Supporting Actor in a Comedy Series winner

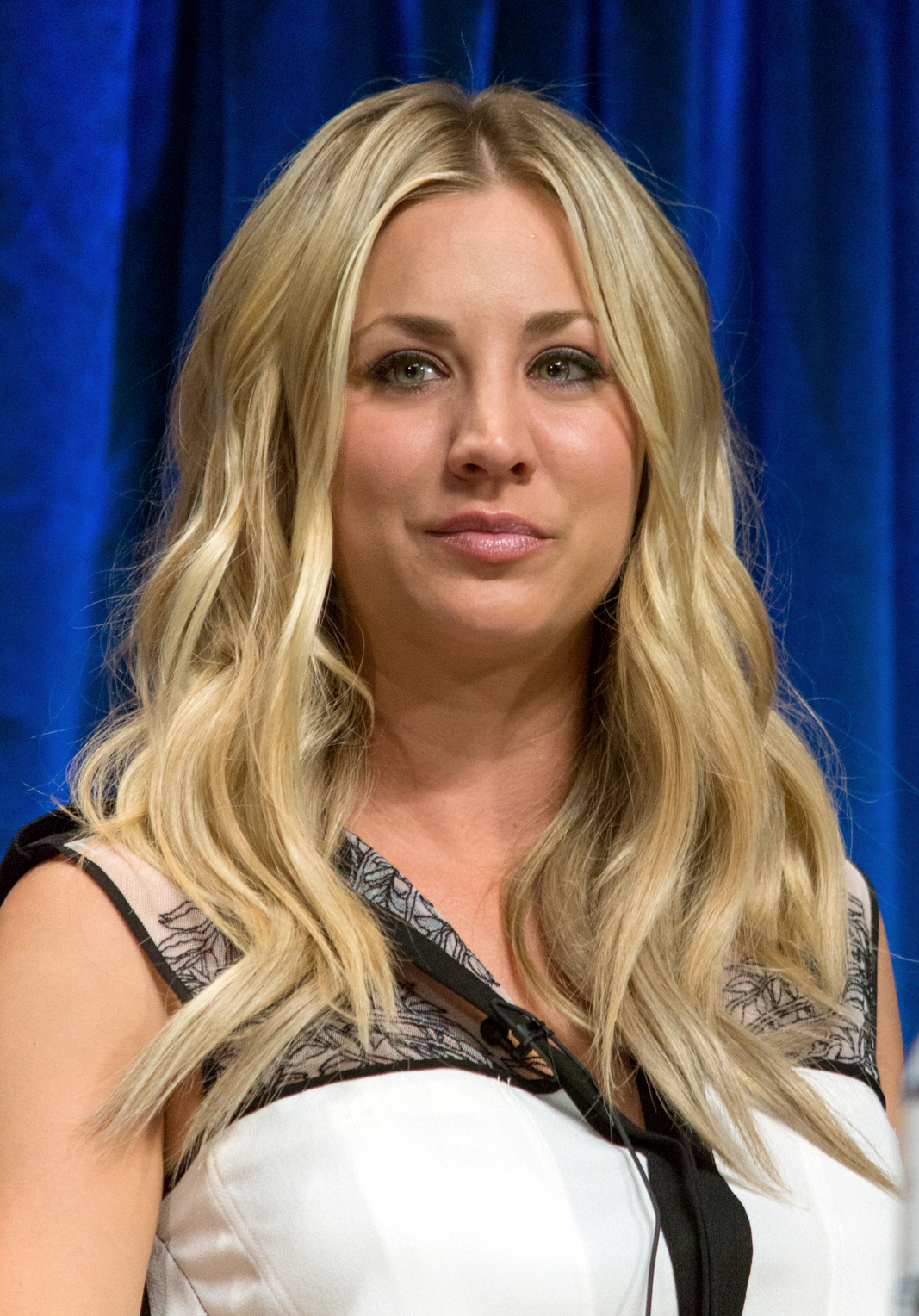
Kaley Cuoco, Best Supporting Actress in a Comedy Series co-winner

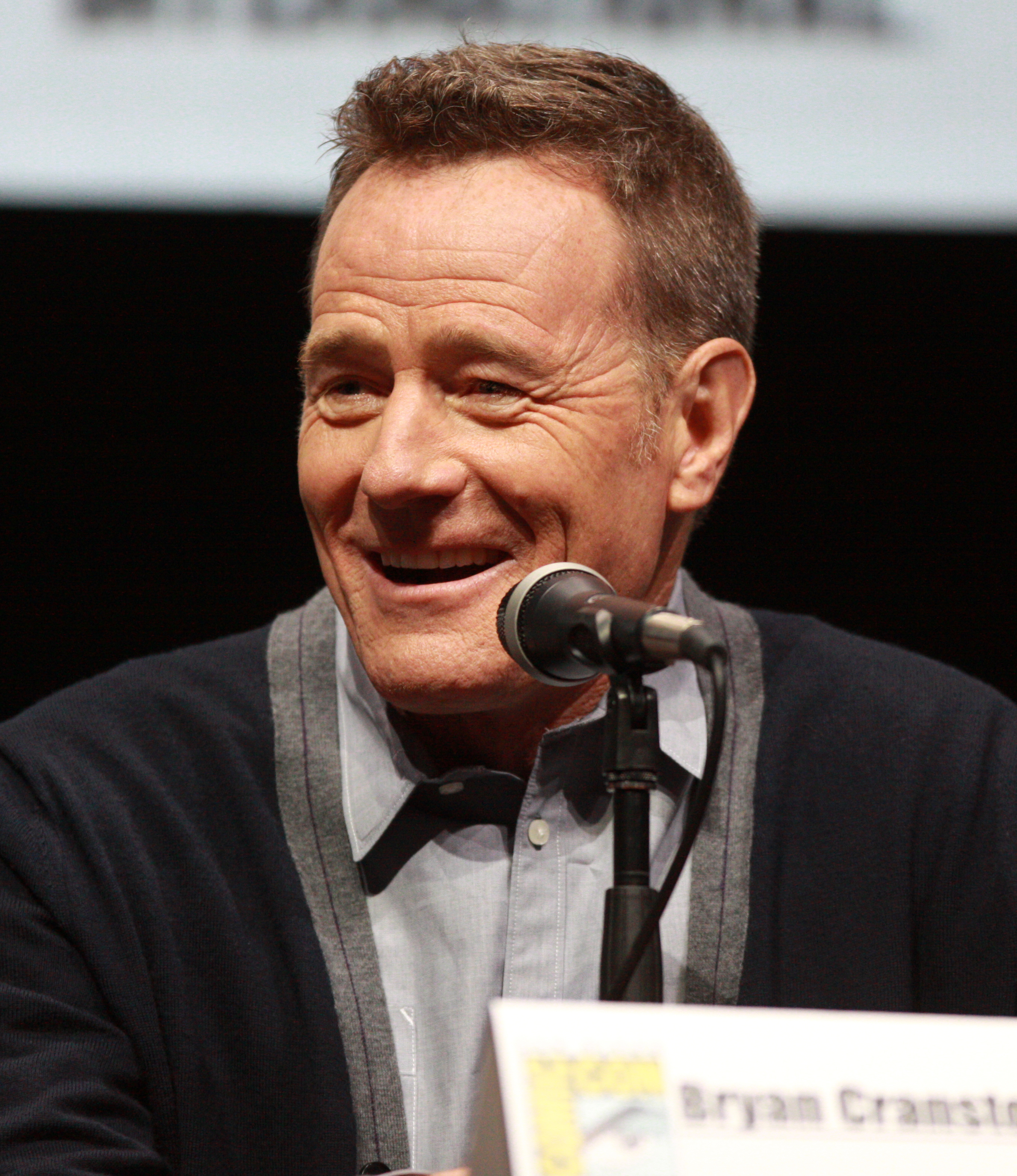
Bryan Cranston, Best Actor in a Drama Series winner

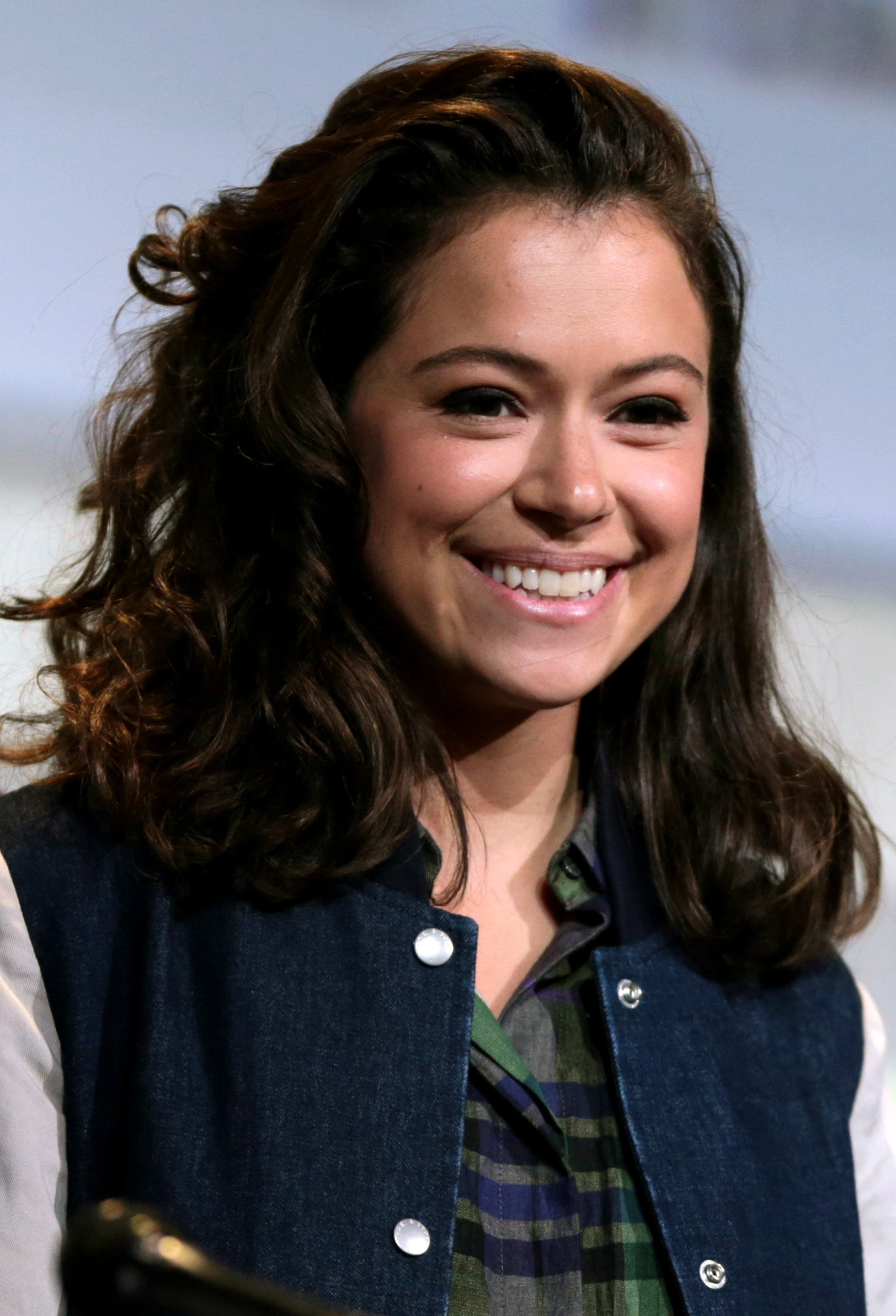
Tatiana Maslany, Best Actress in a Drama Series winner

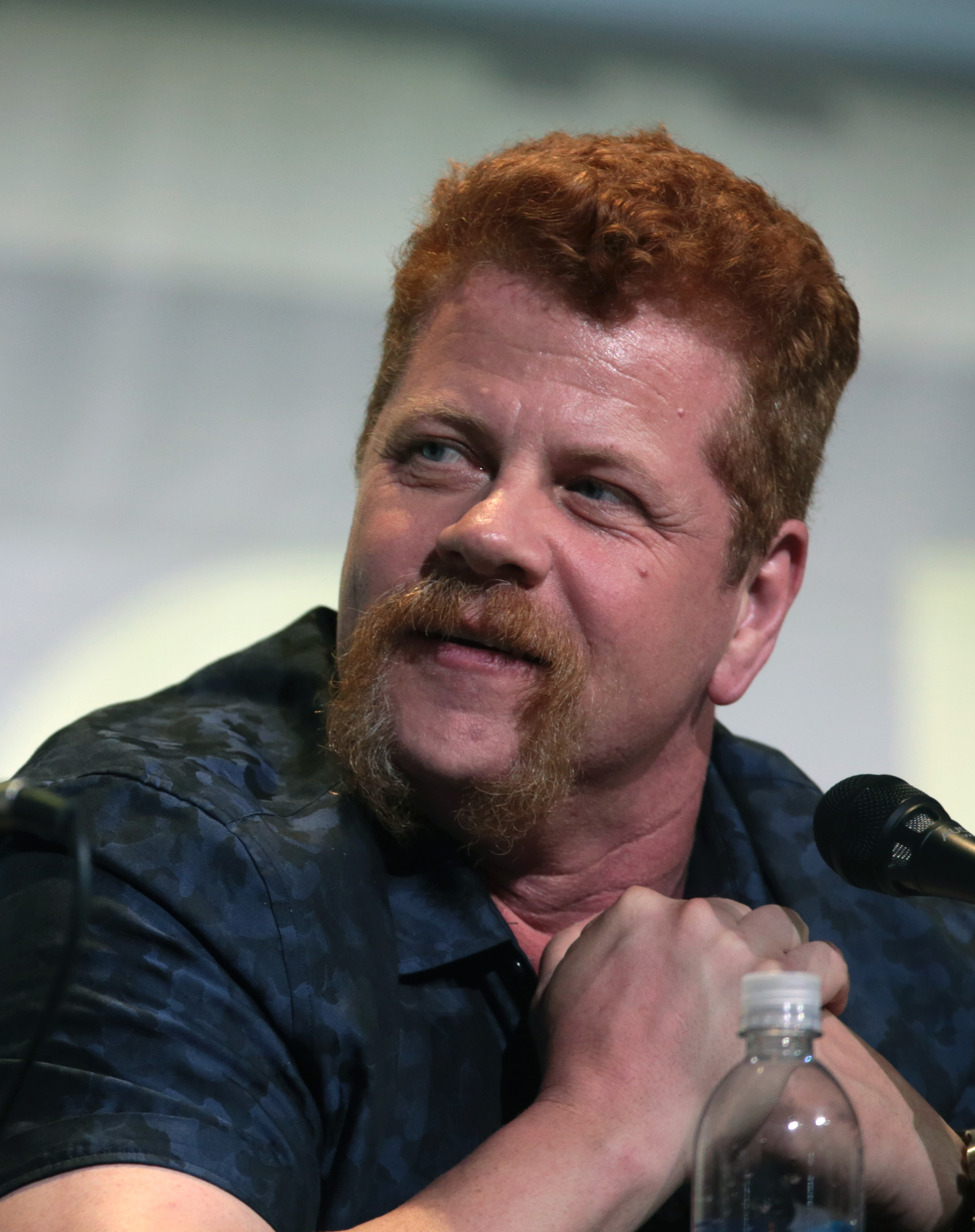
Michael Cudlitz, Best Supporting Actor in a Drama Series winner

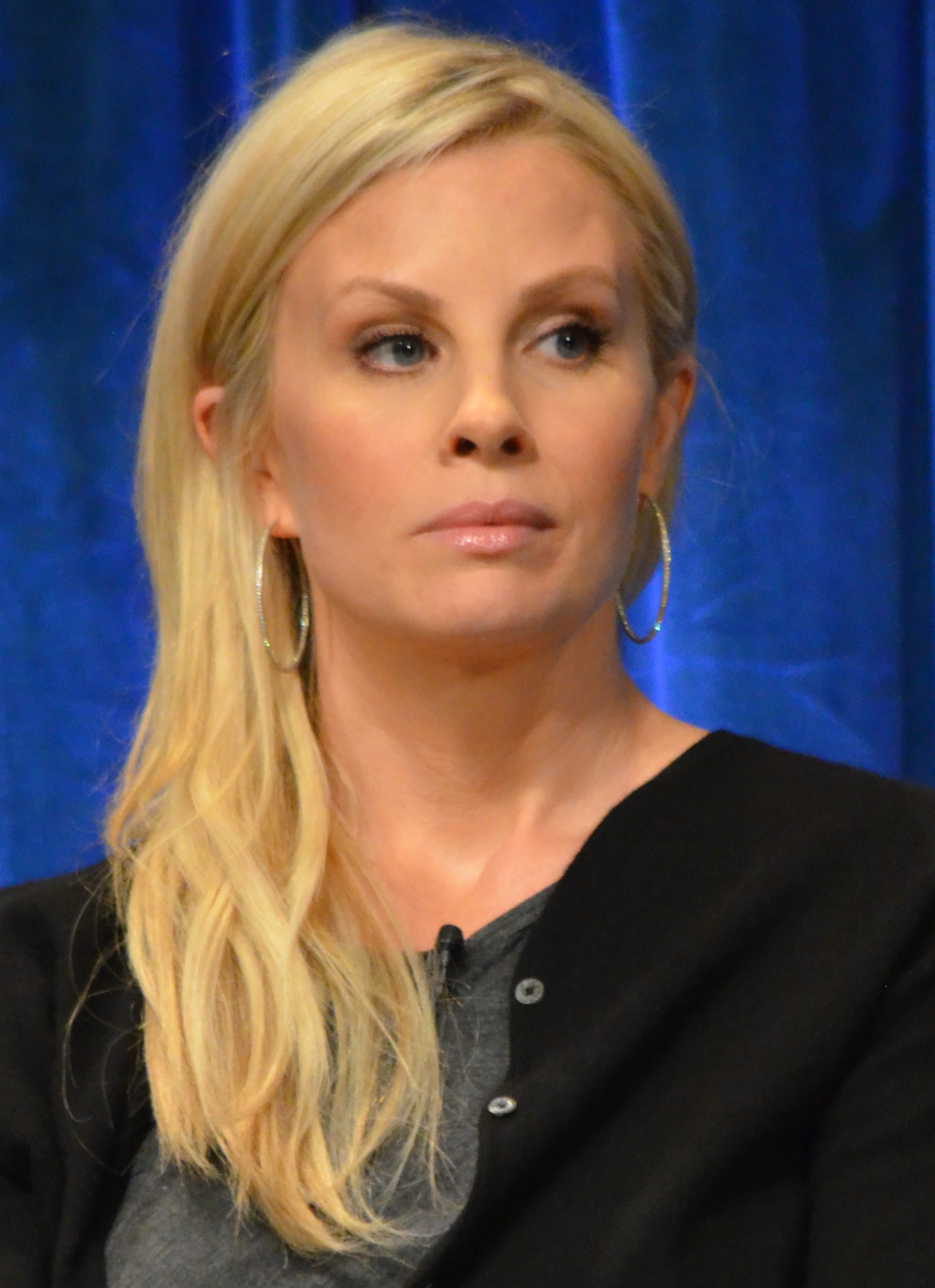
Monica Potter, Best Supporting Actress in a Drama Series winner

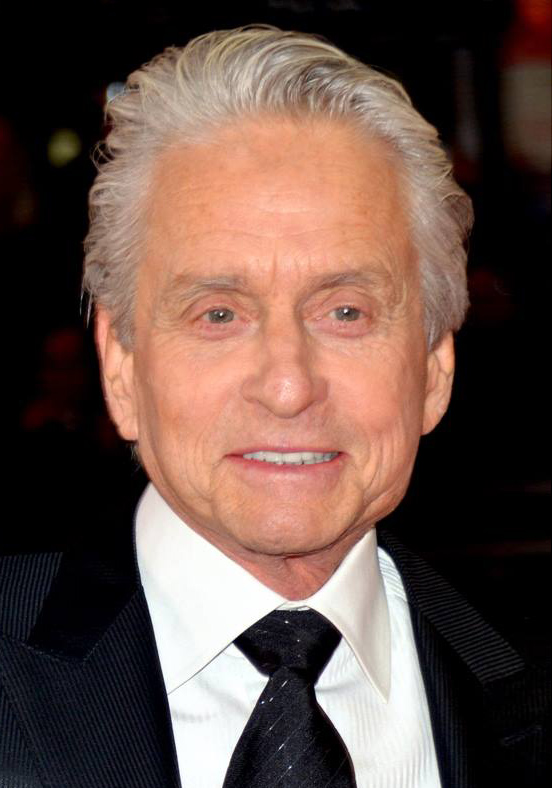
Michael Douglas, Best Actor in a Movie/Miniseries winner

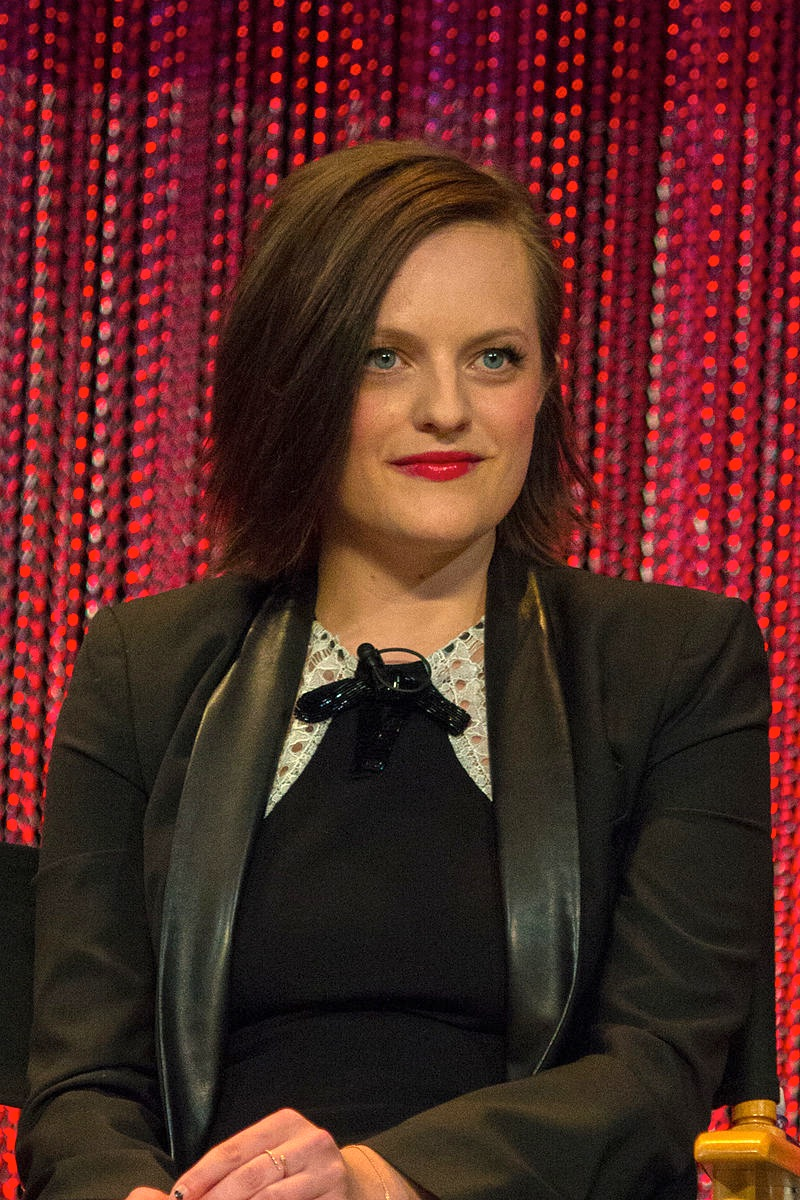
Elisabeth Moss, Best Actress in a Movie/Miniseries winner

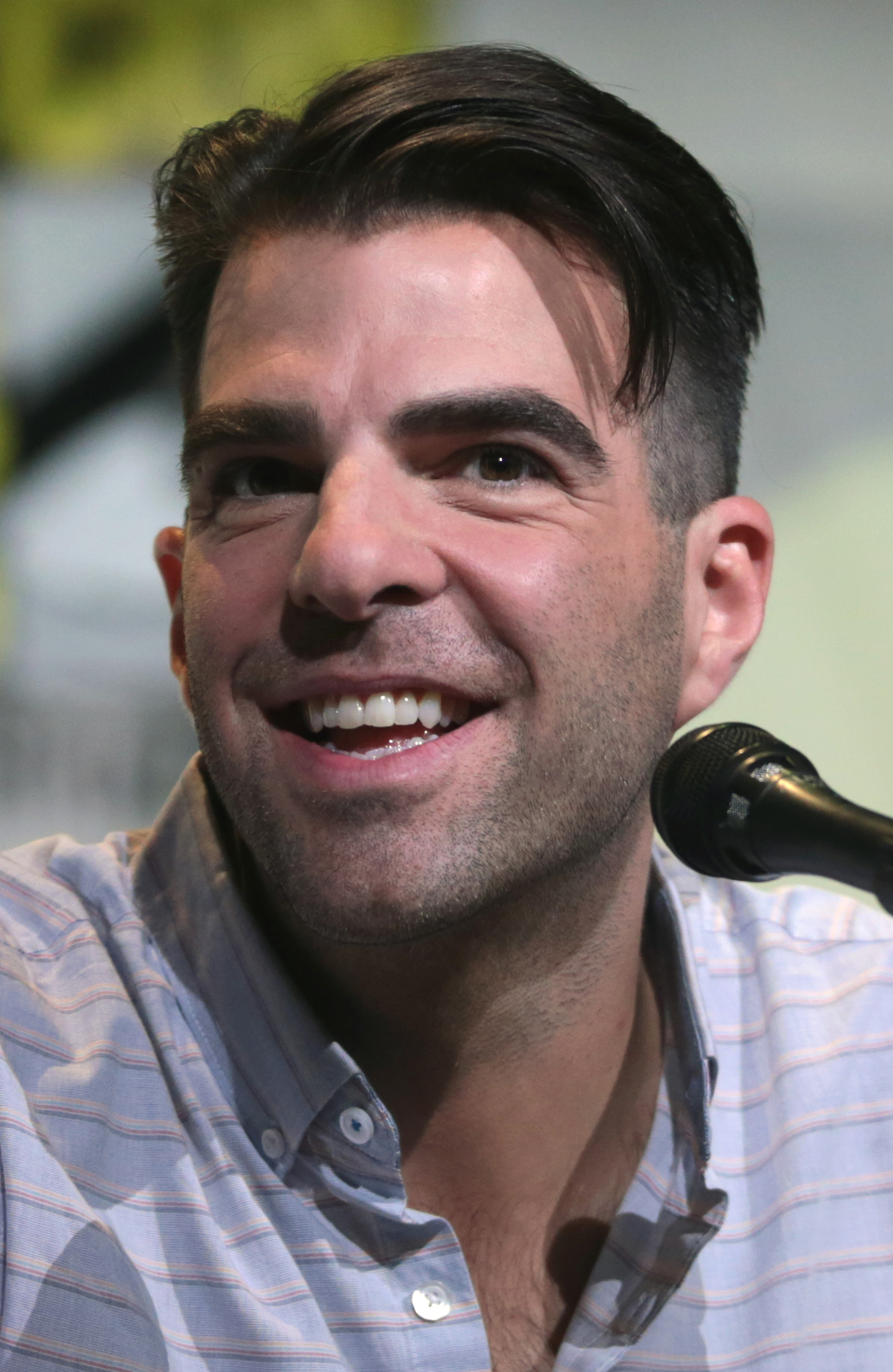
Zachary Quinto, Best Supporting Actor in a Movie/Miniseries winner

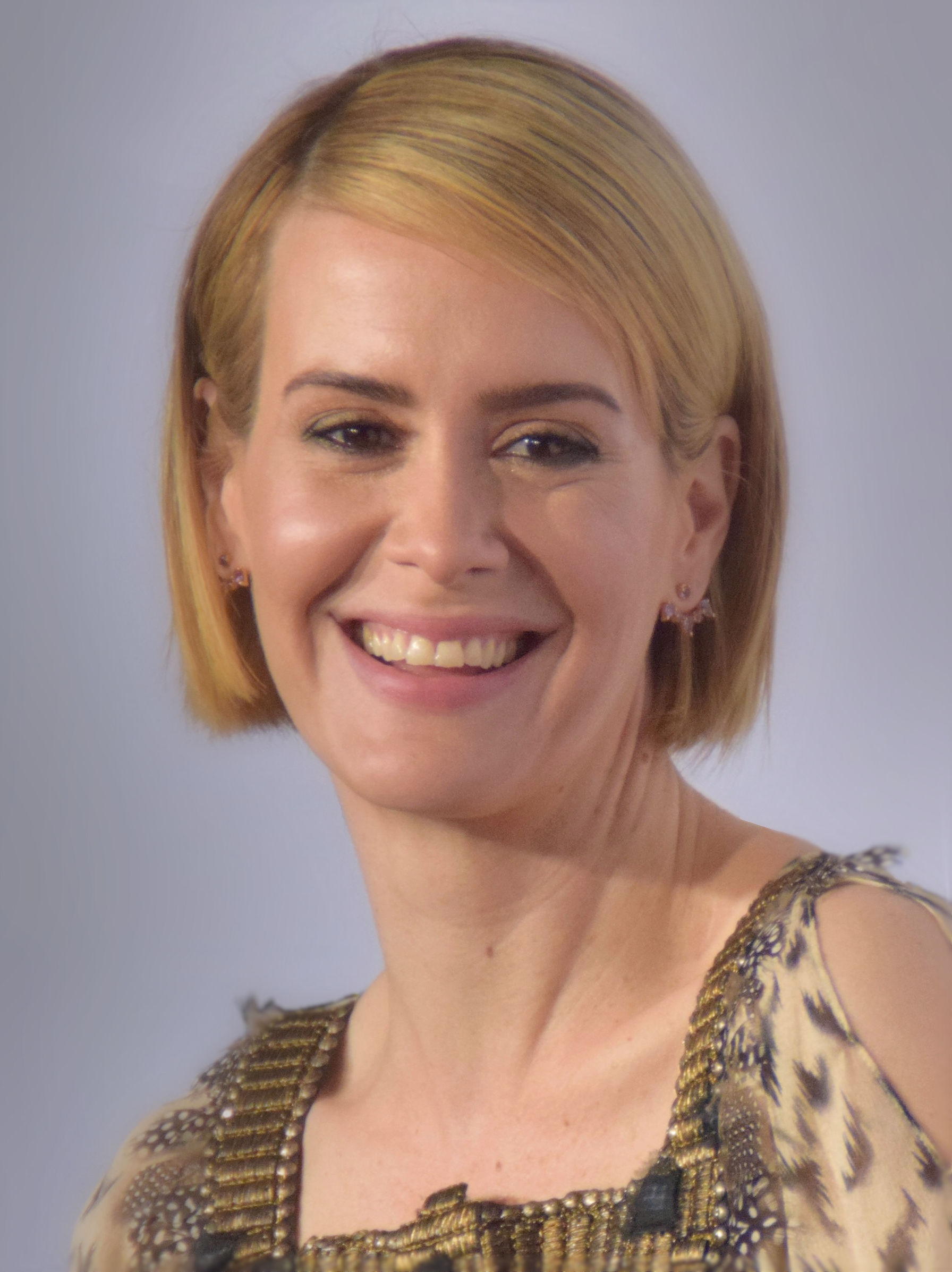
Sarah Paulson, Best Supporting Actress in a Movie/Miniseries winner

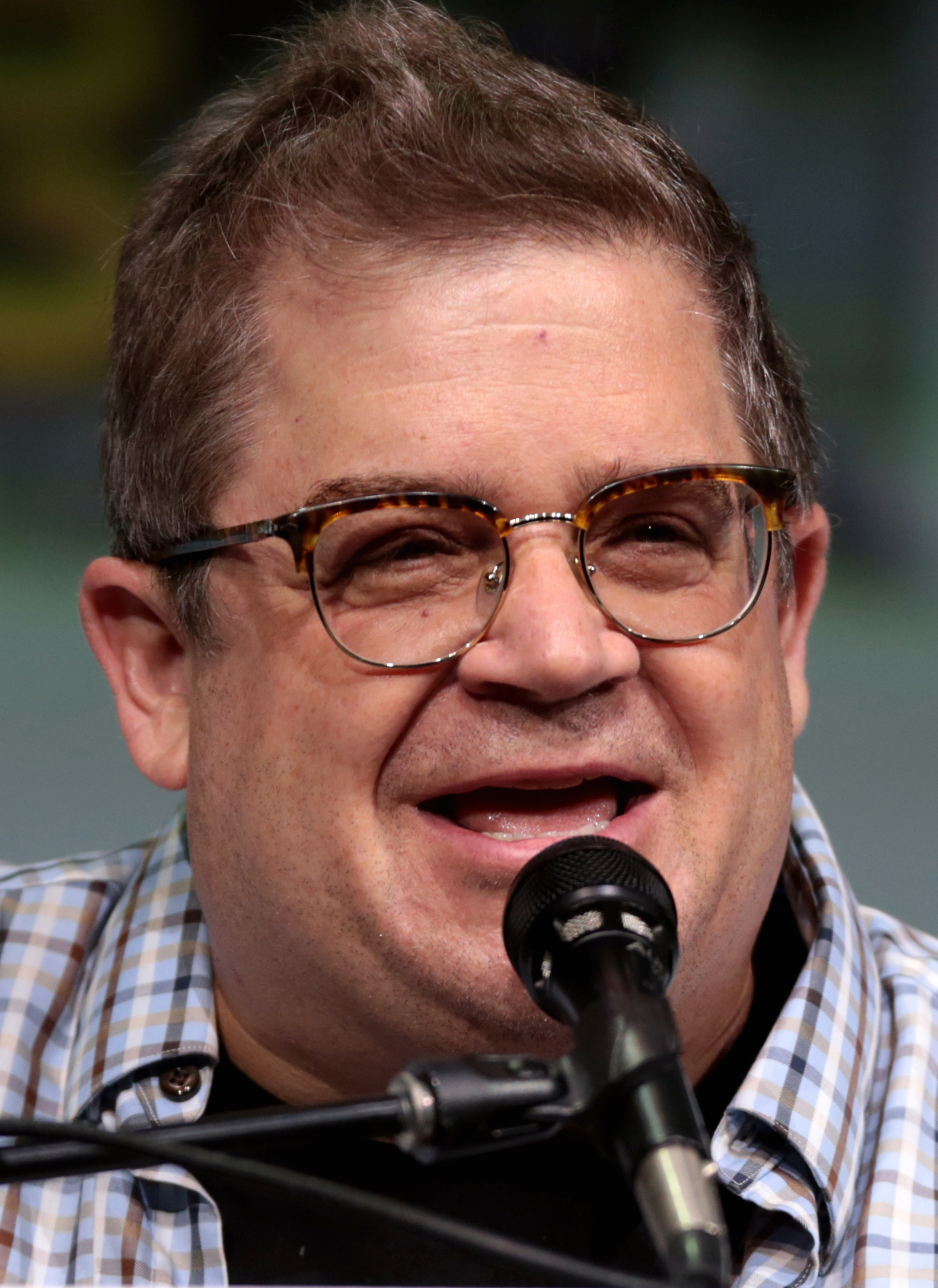
Patton Oswalt, Best Guest Performer in a Comedy Series winner

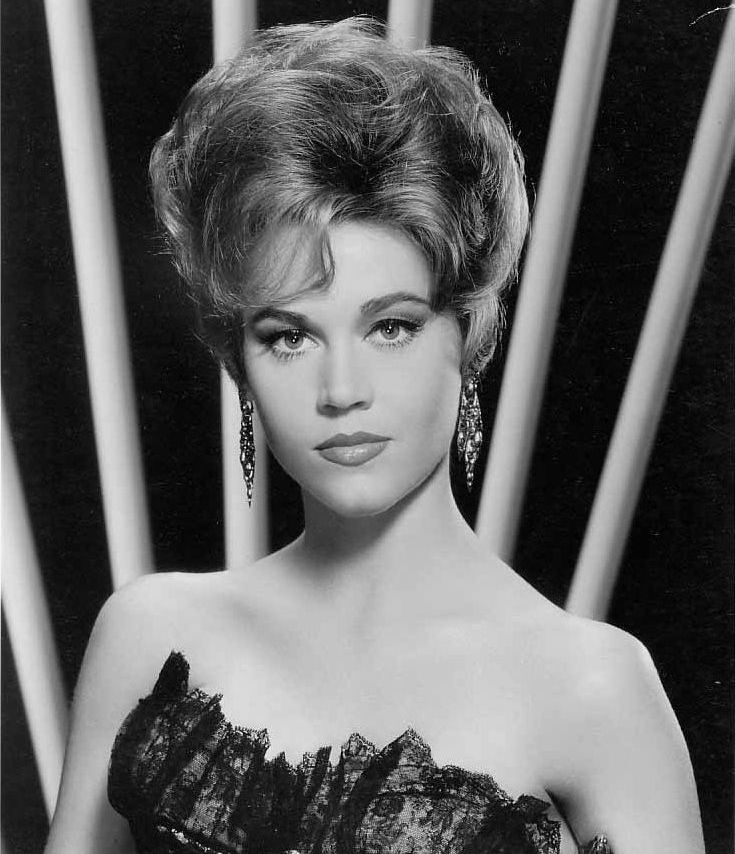
Jane Fonda, Best Guest Performer in a Drama Series winner

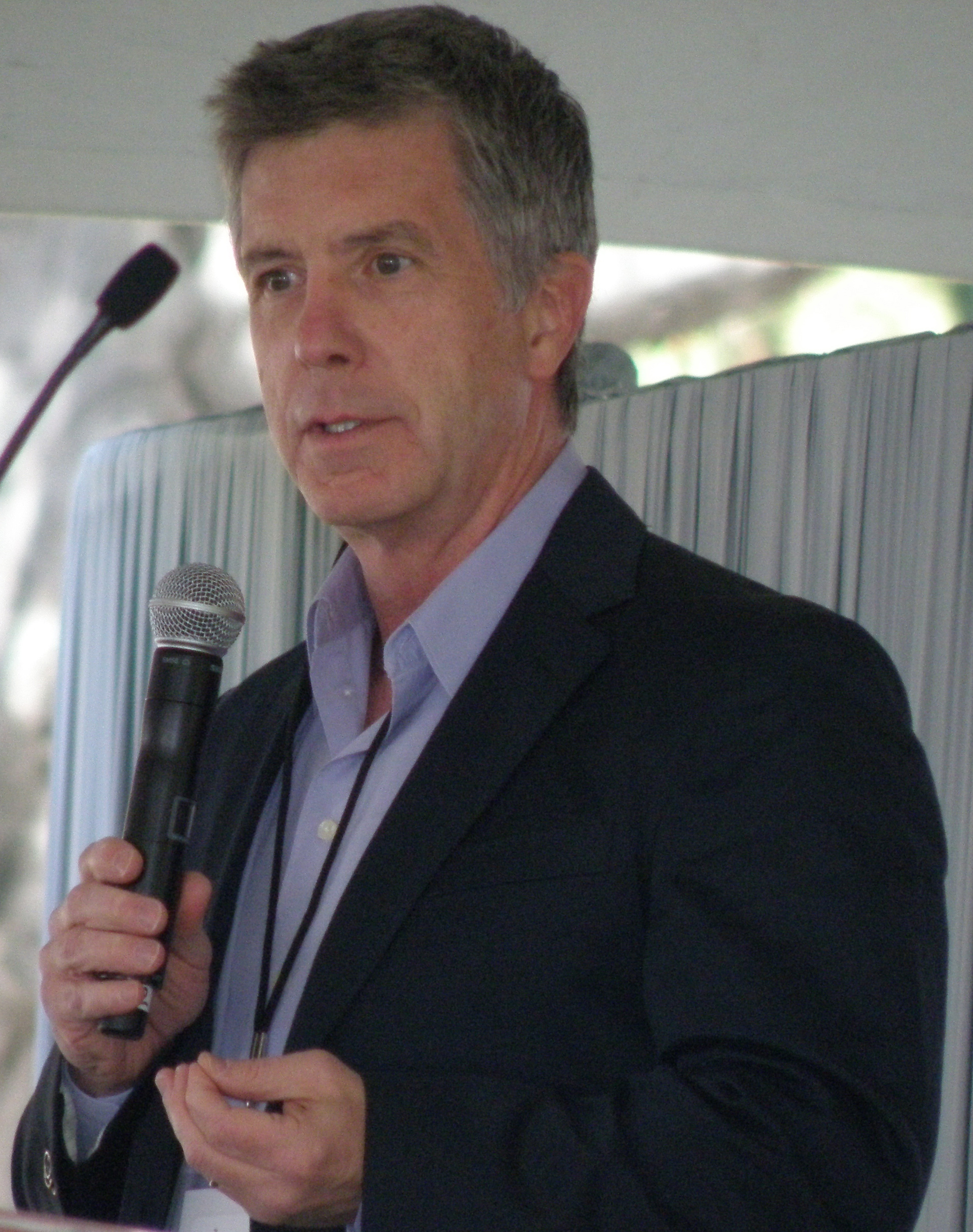
Tom Bergeron, Best Reality Show Host winner

Best Series
Best Comedy Series	Best Drama Series
**The Big Bang Theory (CBS)**: Louie (FX); The Middle (ABC); New Girl (Fox); Parks and Recreation (NBC); Veep (HBO)	**Breaking Bad (AMC) (TIE)**; **Game of Thrones (HBO) (TIE)**: The Americans (FX); Downton Abbey (PBS); The Good Wife (CBS); Homeland (Showtime)
Best Movie/Miniseries	Best Animated Series
**Behind the Candelabra (HBO)**: American Horror Story: Asylum (FX); The Crimson Petal and the White (Encore); The Hour (BBC America); Political Animals (USA); Top of the Lake (Sundance Channel)	**Archer (FX)**: Adventure Time (Cartoon Network); Phineas and Ferb (Disney Channel); Regular Show (Cartoon Network); The Simpsons (Fox); Star Wars: The Clone Wars (Cartoon Network)
Most Exciting New Series (All Honored)
Agents of S.H.I.E.L.D. (ABC); The Bridge (FX); Masters of Sex (Showtime); The Michael J. Fox Show (NBC); Ray Donovan (Showtime); Under the Dome (CBS)
Best Acting in a Comedy Series
Best Actor	Best Actress
**Louis C.K. as Louie – Louie**: Don Cheadle as Marty Kaan – House of Lies; Jake Johnson as Nick Miller – New Girl; Jim Parsons as Dr. Sheldon Cooper – The Big Bang Theory; Adam Scott as Ben Wyatt – Parks and Recreation; Jeremy Sisto as George Altman – Suburgatory	**Julia Louis-Dreyfus as Selina Meyer – Veep**: Laura Dern as Amy Jellicoe – Enlightened; Zooey Deschanel as Jessica Day – New Girl; Lena Dunham as Hannah Horvath – Girls; Sutton Foster as Michelle Simms Flowers – Bunheads; Amy Poehler as Leslie Knope – Parks and Recreation
Best Supporting Actor	Best Supporting Actress
**Simon Helberg as Howard Wolowitz – The Big Bang Theory**: Max Greenfield as Schmidt – New Girl; Alex Karpovsky as Ray Ploshansky – Girls; Adam Pally as Max Blum – Happy Endings; Chris Pratt as Andy Dwyer – Parks and Recreation; Danny Pudi as Abed Nadir – Community	**Kaley Cuoco as Penny – The Big Bang Theory (TIE)**; **Eden Sher as Sue Heck – The Middle (TIE)**: Carly Chaikin as Dalia Oprah Royce – Suburgatory; Sarah Hyland as Haley Dunphy – Modern Family; Melissa Rauch as Dr. Bernadette Rostenkowski-Wolowitz – The Big Bang Theory; Casey Wilson as Penny Hartz – Happy Endings
Best Acting in a Drama Series
Best Actor	Best Actress
**Bryan Cranston as Walter White – Breaking Bad**: Damian Lewis as Nicholas Brody – Homeland; Andrew Lincoln as Rick Grimes – The Walking Dead; Timothy Olyphant as Raylan Givens – Justified; Matthew Rhys as Philip Jennings – The Americans; Kevin Spacey as Frank Underwood – House of Cards	**Tatiana Maslany as Various Characters – Orphan Black**: Claire Danes as Carrie Mathison – Homeland; Vera Farmiga as Norma Bates – Bates Motel; Julianna Margulies as Alicia Florrick – The Good Wife; Elisabeth Moss as Peggy Olson – Mad Men; Keri Russell as Elizabeth Jennings – The Americans
Best Supporting Actor	Best Supporting Actress
**Michael Cudlitz as John Cooper – Southland**: Jonathan Banks as Mike Ehrmantraut – Breaking Bad; Nikolaj Coster-Waldau as Jaime Lannister – Game of Thrones; Noah Emmerich as Stan Beeman – The Americans; Walton Goggins as Boyd Crowder – Justified; Corey Stoll as Peter Russo – House of Cards	**Monica Potter as Kristina Braverman – Parenthood**: Jennifer Carpenter as Debra Morgan – Dexter; Emilia Clarke as Daenerys Targaryen – Game of Thrones; Anna Gunn as Skyler White – Breaking Bad; Regina King as Det. Lydia Adams – Southland; Abigail Spencer as Amantha Holden – Rectify
Best Acting in a Movie/Miniseries
Best Actor	Best Actress
**Michael Douglas as Liberace – Behind the Candelabra**: Benedict Cumberbatch as Christopher Tietjens – Parade's End; Matt Damon as Scott Thorson – Behind the Candelabra; Toby Jones as Alfred Hitchcock – The Girl; Al Pacino as Phil Spector – Phil Spector; Dominic West as Hector Madden – The Hour	**Elisabeth Moss as Det. Robin Griffin – Top of the Lake**: Angela Bassett as Coretta Scott King – Betty & Coretta; Romola Garai as Bel Rowley – The Hour; Rebecca Hall as Sylvia Tietjens – Parade's End; Jessica Lange as Sister Jude Martin / Judy Martin – American Horror Story: Asylum; Sigourney Weaver as Elaine Barrish – Political Animals
Best Supporting Actor	Best Supporting Actress
**Zachary Quinto as Dr. Oliver Thredson – American Horror Story: Asylum**: James Cromwell as Dr. Arthur Arden / Hans Grüper – American Horror Story: Asylum; Peter Mullan as Matt Mitcham – Top of the Lake; Sebastian Stan as T.J. Hammond – Political Animals; David Wenham as Det. Al Parker – Top of the Lake; Thomas M. Wright as Johnno Mitcham – Top of the Lake	**Sarah Paulson as Lana Winters – American Horror Story: Asylum**: Ellen Burstyn as Margaret Barrish – Political Animals; Sienna Miller as Tippi Hedren – The Girl; Lily Rabe as Sister Mary Eunice McKee – American Horror Story: Asylum; Imelda Staunton as Alma Reville – The Girl; Alfre Woodard as Louisa "Ouiser" Boudreaux – Steel Magnolias
Best Guest Performing
Best Guest Performer – Comedy	Best Guest Performer – Drama
**Patton Oswalt as Garth Blundin – Parks and Recreation**: Melissa Leo as Laurie – Louie; David Lynch as Jack Dall – Louie; Bob Newhart as Arthur Jeffries, Ph.D. / Professor Proton – The Big Bang Theory; Molly Shannon as Eileen – Enlightened; Patrick Wilson as Joshua – Girls	**Jane Fonda as Leona Lansing – The Newsroom**: Jim Beaver as Sheriff Shelby Parlow – Justified; Martha Plimpton as Patti Nyholm – The Good Wife; Carrie Preston as Elsbeth Tascioni – The Good Wife; Diana Rigg as Lady Olenna Tyrell – Game of Thrones; Jimmy Smits as Nero Padilla – Sons of Anarchy
Reality & Variety
Best Reality Series	Best Reality Series – Competition
**Duck Dynasty (A&E) (TIE)**; **Push Girls (Sundance Channel) (TIE)**: The Moment (USA); Pawn Stars (History); Small Town Security (AMC); Wild Things with Dominic Monaghan (BBC America)	**The Voice (NBC)**: Chopped (Food Network); Face Off (Syfy); Shark Tank (ABC); So You Think You Can Dance (Fox); Survivor (CBS)
Best Talk Show	Best Reality Show Host
**The Daily Show with Jon Stewart (Comedy Central)**: Conan (TBS); The Ellen DeGeneres Show (NBC); Jimmy Kimmel Live! (ABC); Late Night with Jimmy Fallon (NBC); Marie (Hallmark Channel)	**Tom Bergeron – Dancing with the Stars**: Cat Deeley – So You Think You Can Dance; Gordon Ramsay – Hell's Kitchen / MasterChef; RuPaul – RuPaul's Drag Race; Ryan Seacrest – American Idol; Kurt Warner – The Moment

== Shows with multiple wins ==
The following shows received multiple awards:

Program	Network	Category	Wins
The Big Bang Theory	CBS	Comedy	3
American Horror Story: Asylum	FX	Movie/Miniseries	2
Behind the Candelabra	HBO	Movie/Miniseries	2
Breaking Bad	AMC	Drama	2

== Shows with multiple nominations ==
The following shows received multiple nominations:

Program	Network	Category	Nominations
American Horror Story: Asylum	FX	Movie/Miniseries	6
The Big Bang Theory	CBS	Comedy	6
Parks and Recreation	NBC	Comedy	5
Top of the Lake	Sundance Channel	Movie/Miniseries	5
The Americans	FX	Drama	4
Breaking Bad	AMC	Drama	4
Game of Thrones	HBO	Drama	4
The Good Wife	CBS	Drama	4
Louie	FX	Comedy	4
New Girl	Fox	Comedy	4
Political Animals	USA	Movie/Miniseries	4
Behind the Candelabra	HBO	Movie/Miniseries	3
The Girl	HBO	Movie/Miniseries	3
Girls	HBO	Comedy	3
Homeland	Showtime	Drama	3
The Hour	BBC America	Movie/Miniseries	3
Enlightened	HBO	Comedy	2
Happy Endings	ABC	Comedy	2
House of Cards	Netflix	Drama	2
Justified	FX	Drama	2
The Middle	ABC	Comedy	2
The Moment	USA	Reality	2
Parade's End	HBO	Movie/Miniseries	2
So You Think You Can Dance	Fox	Reality – Competition	2
Southland	TNT	Drama	2
Suburgatory	ABC	Comedy	2
Veep	HBO	Comedy	2

== Presenters ==
- Malin Akerman
- Angela Bassett
- Miranda Cosgrove
- Hugh Dancy
- Cat Deeley
- Josh Gad
- Johnny Galecki
- Seth Green
- Allison Janney
- Tatiana Maslany
- Maria Menounos
- Elisabeth Moss
- Kunal Nayyar
- Jack Osbourne
- Adam Pally
- Sarah Paulson
- Aubrey Plaza
- Kevin Rahm
- John Ratzenberger
- Emmy Rossum
- Jimmy Smits
- Eric Stonestreet
- Sam Trammell
