= Capital Hill (album) =

Studio album by Buck Hill
- Released: 1990
- Recorded: August 7, 1989
- Studio: Van Gelder Studio, Englewood Cliffs, NJ
- Genre: Jazz
- Length: 50:08 CD release with additional track
- Label: Muse; MR/MCD 5384
- Producer: Houston Person

Buck Hill chronology
| Impressions (1983) | Capital Hill (1990) | The Buck Stops Here (1993) |

Capital Hill is an album by saxophonist Buck Hill which was recorded in 1989 and released on the Muse label.

== Reception ==
Professional ratings
Review scores
| Source | Rating |
|---|---|
| AllMusic | 4/5 stars |

The AllMusic review by Scott Yanow stated "this Muse CD is mostly comprised of standards and puts the emphasis on the boppish side of the tenor's style ... Hill romps throughout the program".

== Track listing ==
1. "Tenor Madness" (Sonny Rollins) – 4:12
2. "Chelsea Bridge" (Billy Strayhorn) – 7:38
3. "Stompin' at the Savoy" (Edgar Sampson, Benny Goodman, Chick Webb, Andy Razaf) – 8:21
4. "Jazz Ballad" (Buck Hill) – 6:02
5. "On the Trail" (Ferde Grofé) – 6:27
6. "Someone to Watch Over Me" (George Gershwin, Ira Gershwin) – 5:45
7. "Hail to the Redskins" (Barnee Breeskin, Corinne Griffith) – 4:59
8. "Vierd Blues" (John Coltrane) – 6:44 Additional track on CD release

== Personnel ==
- Buck Hill – tenor saxophone
- Barry Harris – piano
- Ray Drummond – bass
- Freddie Waits – drums
