= I'm Beginning to See the Light =

Song
- Published: 1944 by Grand Music Corp
- Songwriters: Duke Ellington, Don George, Johnny Hodges, and Harry James

"I'm Beginning to See the Light" is a popular song and jazz standard, with music by Duke Ellington, Johnny Hodges, and Harry James and lyrics by Don George, published in 1944.

== 1945 recordings ==
- Duke Ellington and his Famous Orchestra recorded the song in New York City on December 1, 1944, with vocal by Joya Sherrill. It was released as RCA Victor 20–1618 in early 1945 on a 78rpm record backing "Don't You Know I Care". The recording went to No. 4 on the Harlem Hit Parade chart in Billboard and reached No. 6 on the pop chart.
- Harry James and his Orchestra for Columbia Records, with lead vocals by Kitty Kallen, recorded the song on November 21, 1944, and reached No. 1 for two weeks in January 1945. James' version also reached No. 7 on Billboard's Second Annual High School Survey in 1945.
- Ella Fitzgerald and The Ink Spots, featuring singer Bill Kenny, recorded a version for Decca Records that was on the pop song hits list for six weeks in 1945 and reached No. 5.

== Other notable recordings ==
- Oscar Alemán (1946)
- Gerry Mulligan on Gerry Mulligan Quartet Volume 2 (1953)
- Count Basie and Joe Williams on The Greatest!! Count Basie Plays, Joe Williams Sings Standards (1956)
- The Hi-Lo's on Under Glass (1956)
- Mel Tormé on Mel Tormé at the Crescendo (1957)
- Connie Francis on Who's Sorry Now? (1958)
- Peggy Lee on Things Are Swingin' (1958)
- Johnnie Ray on 'Til Morning (1958)
- Joanie Sommers on Positively the Most! (1960)
- Mary Stallings and Cal Tjader on Cal Tjader Plays, Mary Stallings Sings (1961)
- Bobby Darin on Oh! Look at Me Now (1962); featured in the 1996 film Swingers
- Frank Sinatra on Sinatra and Swingin' Brass (1962)
- Clare Fischer on Songs for Rainy Day Lovers (1967)
- Rosemary Clooney and Woody Herman on My Buddy (1983)
- Natalie Cole on Take a Look (1993)
- Dee Dee Bridgewater on Prelude to a Kiss: The Duke Ellington Album (1996)
- Royce Campbell on Get Happy (2007)
- Sutton Foster on Wish (2009)
- Joe Jackson on The Duke (2012)
