= Michael Rafter =

Michael Rafter is an American arranger, musical director, musical supervisor, conductor, and musician best known for his work on Broadway and collaborations with Sutton Foster. He was the musical director of the 2014 Broadway revival of Violet.

== Awards ==
Rafter was awarded the 1994 Emmy Award for Outstanding Individual Achievement in Music Direction for his work on the Gypsy, a televised adaptation of the stage musical of the same name.

== Educational career ==
Rafter is an associate professor of musical theatre at Ball State University.

== Personal life ==
Rafter married arranged and composer Jeanine Tesori on September 30, 1994, in Italy. As of 2008, they lived with their child in Manhattan. By 2016, the couple had gotten divorced.

== Credits ==
=== Stage ===
Broadway

- Violet° musical director (2014)
- Everyday Rapture musical supervisor (2010)
- Sweet Charity Broadway Revival additional music and vocal arranger (2005)
- Thoroughly Modern Millie* conductor, musical director (2002-2004)
- Swing! musical supervisor, music arranger (1999-2001)
- The Sound of Music Revival musical director, conductor (1998-1999)
- The King and I Revival musical director, conductor (1996-1998)
- The Most Happy Fella assistant conductor, piano (1992)
- Gypsy Revival assistant conductor, piano (1989-1991)

West End

- Thoroughly Modern Millie° musical director (2003)

Off Broadway

- Violet° musical director, conductor (1997)
- Merrily We Roll Along musical director (1994)
- Theda Barra and the Frontier Rabbi musical director (1993)
- Mandrake Musical Director (1984)

Other Credits

- Thoroughly Modern Millie° musical director (2000)
- Thoroughly Modern Millie° musical director (1999)

° Denotes Musical composed by his wife Jeanine Tesori

=== Discography ===
- An Evening with Sutton Foster: Live at the Café Carlyle (2011)
- Wish (2008)
- Thoroughly Modern Millie Original Cast Recording (2002)
