= Ensemble (musical theatre) =

On-stage performers other than the featured players

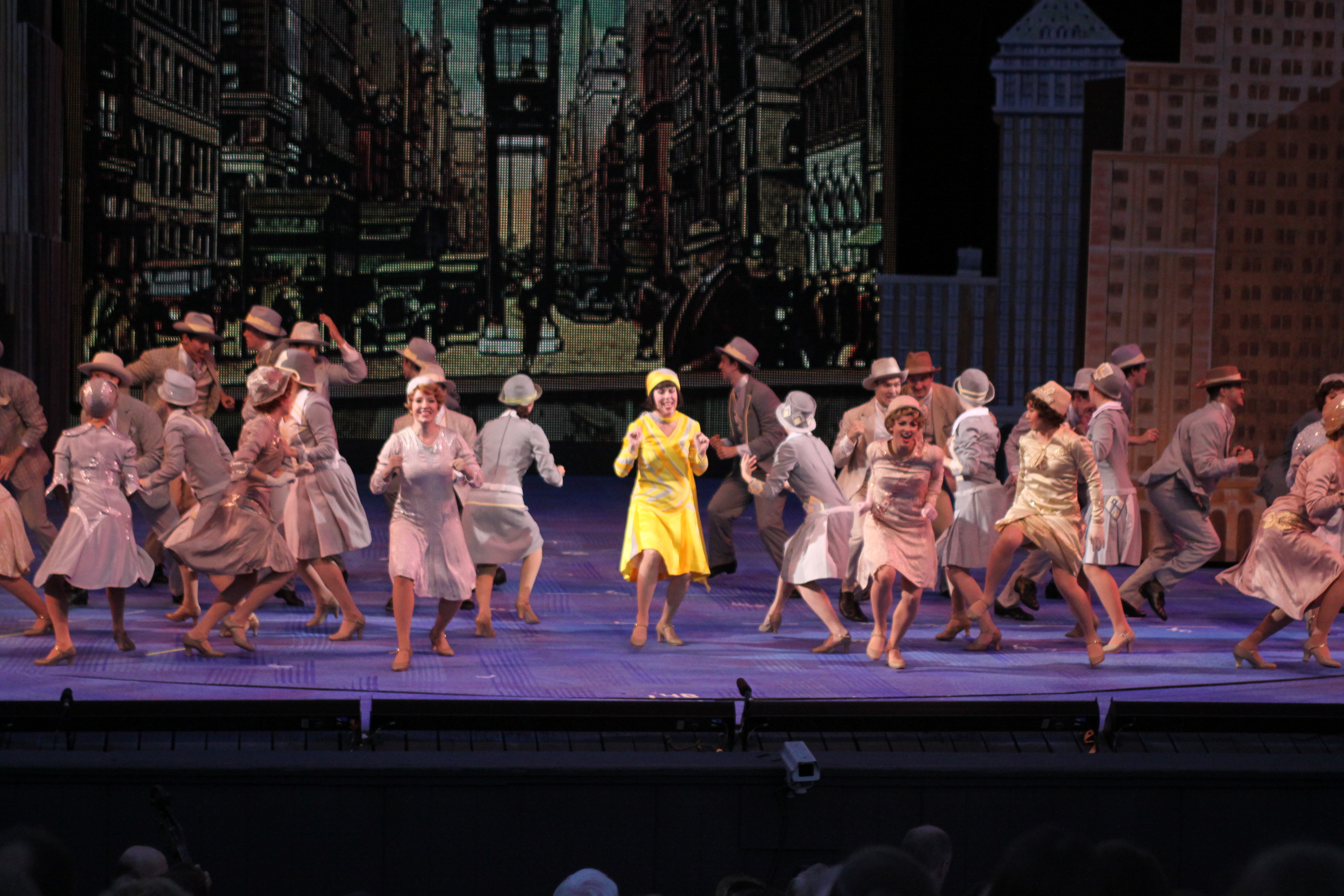
A musical number from Thoroughly Modern Millie features the lead actress (in yellow) with a large ensemble.

In musical theatre, the ensemble or chorus are the on-stage performers other than the featured players. Ensemble members typically do not play named characters and have few or no spoken lines or solo parts; rather, they sing and dance in unison. An ensemble member may play multiple roles through the course of a show.

== Origin ==
The modern musical chorus descends from the chorus line, associated with early 20th century theatrical revues such as Ziegfeld Follies. The chorus line was typically composed of women (dubbed chorus girls or chorines) performing synchronized dances in a line.

== Composition ==
In the 2018–2019 season, ensemble sizes for Broadway productions ranged from 9 (for Hadestown) to 55 (for The Lion King). Ensemble sizes on Broadway have generally decreased over time, possibly due to cost-cutting. Many modern musicals feature no ensemble at all, such as Girl from the North Country and Six.

Within the ensemble there exist certain specialized roles. The dance captain is an ensemble member who leads routine dance rehearsals once the show has opened and teaches choreography to new ensemble members. An ensemble member may also understudy a principal role, meaning that they play that role when the regular actor is unable to. A swing is a performer who is prepared to step in for a number of ensemble roles (known as tracks).

== Recognition ==
Major theatre awards such as the Tony Awards and Olivier Awards do not recognize ensemble members. In 2018, the Actors' Equity Association, the main union representing theatre performers in the United States, announced a campaign urging the Tony Awards to create two new awards for best ensemble (defined as the entire cast of a production), and best chorus. Similar awards exist in some regional theatre award ceremonies, such as the Jeff Awards in Chicago.

== See also ==
- Corps de ballet, a similar designation in ballet
