= Joe Pagac =

American performance artist and muralist

Joe Pagac (/ˈpædʒɪk/ PA-jik, born January 13, 1981) is an Arizona-based performance artist, muralist and fine artist. He is well known for his large scale and rotating murals, which are often created live during public events. A graduate of the University of Arizona's art program, Joe Pagac traveled extensively worldwide honing his craft before becoming a fixture to the downtown Tucson arts scene. Almost as well known for his philanthropy as well as his artistic talents, Joe Pagac also is involved with many local organizations, including the Tucson Stray Canine Saviors and the Arizona Homeless Project - Breaking the Cycle.

== Biography ==
Pagac studied art at both the University of Arizona and in Italy. He and Arielle Pagac were married on April 22, 2017, with a very public reception (everyone in Tucson was invited) afterward.

== Rotating concert murals ==
Pagac is known for his large scale rotating concert murals which he paints live during public events. Using house paint, paint rollers and large brushes, Pagac paints finished works that are as large as 60 feet wide and 14 feet tall in as little as 8 hours. The murals generally advertise upcoming shows for touring bands but the artwork is designed by Pagac. The rotating murals have depicted a wide range of musical artists including, The Avett Brothers, Sonic Youth, George Thorogood and Cypress Hill. Because the murals advertise bands and are in highly visible locations, bands and graffiti artists began using some of the rotating murals to voice their concern over SB1070 after the law was passed in 2010. Pagac won Best Mural of 2010 awards in both Tucson and Phoenix.

=== Controversy ===
Pagac's promotional murals have come under fire for crossing the line between art advertising and in July 2010 the city of Tucson cited multiple revolving murals with sign code violations, stating that despite the artistic nature of the murals they promoted commercial products. A mural promoting the band The New Pornographers also stirred controversy over what is and is not appropriate to depict in public art when an offended mother filed a formal complaint and demanded the mural be removed due to the word "pornographers".

== Non-concert murals ==
Pagac is a prolific muralist with many styles. His murals are especially visible in downtown Tucson, but they can be found in public (and private) locations around Tucson. As of June 2017, he had painted one of Tucson's largest murals. along Stone Avenue just north of Sixth Street. Some of his many other murals are shown by clicking the Labels link with his name on the Tucson Murals Project blog. Another of his well-known murals is along the railroad tracks downtown on 7th Avenue, a few blocks away from the mural previously mentioned: on the back of the building currently housing Borderlands Brewing.
