= Sutton Foster =

American actress, singer, and dancer (born 1975)

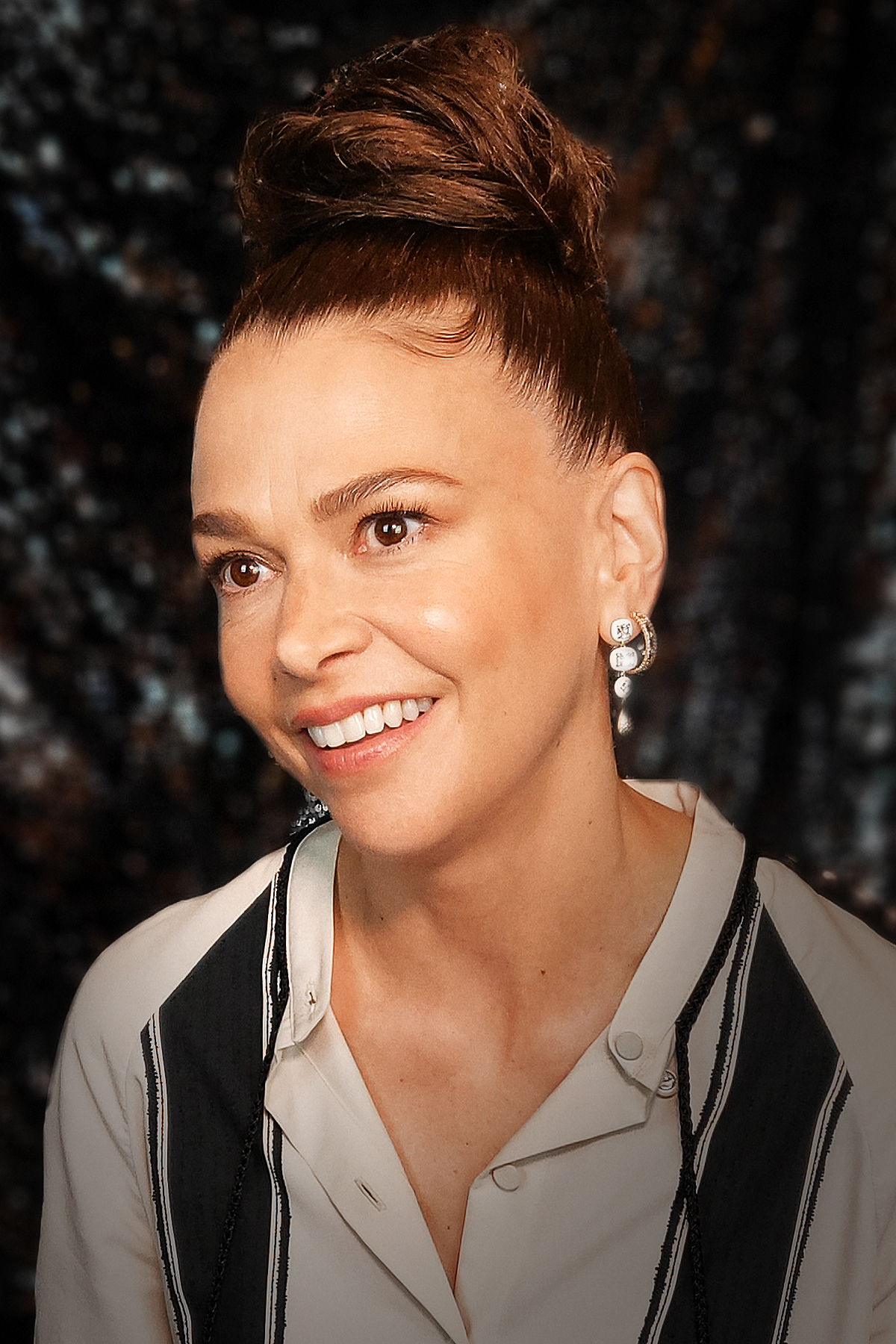
- Foster in 2022
- Born: Sutton Lenore Foster; March 18, 1975 (age 51); Statesboro, Georgia, U.S.
- Education: Carnegie Mellon University (attended)
- Occupations: Actress; singer; dancer
- Years active: 1989–present
- Spouses: Christian Borle (m. 2006; div. 2009) Ted Griffin (m. 2014; sep. 2024)
- Partner: Hugh Jackman (2025–present)
- Children: 1
- Relatives: Hunter Foster (brother); Jennifer Cody (sister-in-law)
- Website: suttonfoster.com

Sutton Lenore Foster (born March 18, 1975) is an American actress, singer, and dancer. She is known for her work in stage musicals on Broadway and has received numerous accolades including two Tony Awards, two Drama Desk Awards, a Drama League Award, and three Outer Critics Circle Awards as well as nominations for a Grammy Award and Laurence Olivier Award.

She has received two Tony Awards for Best Actress in a Musical for playing the title role in Thoroughly Modern Millie (2002) and as sultry nightclub singer Reno Sweeney in Anything Goes (2011), the latter of which she reprised in 2021 at London's Barbican Theatre for which she was nominated for the Laurence Olivier Award for Best Actress in a Musical. She was also Tony-nominated for Little Women (2005), The Drowsy Chaperone (2006), Shrek the Musical (2009), Violet (2014), and The Music Man (2022). She has also starred in Young Frankenstein (2008) and Once Upon a Mattress (2024).

On television, Foster played the lead roles in the short-lived ABC Family comedy-drama Bunheads (2012–2013) and in the TV Land comedy-drama Younger (2015–2021), both of which earned her nominations for the Critics' Choice Television Award for Best Actress in a Comedy Series.

== Early life and education ==
Foster was born on March 18, 1975 in Statesboro, Georgia, and raised in Troy, Michigan. At age 15, she was a contestant on the reality competition show Star Search and also auditioned for the cast of The Mickey Mouse Club. She left Troy High School before graduating (she received her diploma via correspondence courses) to join the national tour of The Will Rogers Follies directed by Tommy Tune.

Foster then attended Carnegie Mellon University for one year, but she left to pursue a theatrical career full-time.

In May 2012 she received an honorary doctorate from Ball State University, "in recognition of her outstanding career in theater, television and music and for her contributions to the educational experience and professional growth of Ball State students." In May 2019, she also received an honorary doctorate from Boston Conservatory at Berklee, which introduced a merit scholarship in her name to be awarded to one student every four years. Her older brother, Hunter Foster, is also an actor.

== Career ==
=== 1995–2001: Early career ===
After touring in the role of Sandy Dumbrowski in the musical Grease throughout 1995, Foster transferred to the Broadway production in 1996. She left to appear in the ensemble of the Broadway musical The Scarlet Pimpernel in 1997, and after that closed she returned as the Star to Be in the revival of Annie. In 1998, Foster appeared in What the World Needs Now at the Old Globe Theatre, before she began touring with Les Misérables as Eponine Thenardier. She then understudied the same role on Broadway in 2000.

Foster left Les Misérables to join the ensemble of Thoroughly Modern Millie in its pre-Broadway run at the La Jolla Playhouse. Original leading lady Kristin Chenoweth landed a television series shortly after rehearsals began and was replaced with Erin Dilly as Millie and Foster as her understudy. After apparent clashes between the creative team, a "mutual" decision was made for Dilly to leave the production. With only nine days remaining before the first preview, Foster took over the role of Millie Dilmount. During a hiatus (before Millie was set to open on Broadway), Foster appeared in Dorian at Goodspeed Musicals, The Three Musketeers at the American Musical Theatre of San Jose, and South Pacific at the Pittsburgh Civic Light Opera.

=== 2002–2010: Breakthrough and stage success ===
Thoroughly Modern Millie finally opened on Broadway at the Marquis Theatre in 2002, to positive reviews. The New York Daily News reviewer said: "newcomer Sutton Foster, who has the pert look, the silver voice and the dazzling legwork to make an extraordinarily winning Millie." Clive Barnes, reviewing for the New York Post wrote "Newcomer Sutton Foster's own star turn as Millie is perfectly charming, but as a star she doesn't twinkle, glitter or light up Broadway like a Christmas tree defying a July noon. But she has a good voice and is cutely agreeable." The Newsday reviewer wrote: "She has a smile that may remind you of Mary Tyler Moore, the gawky comic precision of the young Carol Burnett, the lyricism of a romantic heroine and a smallish but vibrant voice as accurate as it is expressive. As [Millie], another of New York's prototypical small-town girls with big-city dreams, [Sutton Foster] appears unfazed by the burden of a character created onscreen by Julie Andrews. The newcomer takes the big stage with an uninhibited what-the-heck comfort level and the discipline to go with her instincts." Time Magazine wrote: "she's [Sutton Foster] got the full package: girlish gawkiness and Broadway brass, the legs and the lungs. Foster is a big reason the show is just about the cutest thing to hit Broadway since Annie's dimples, with perkily retro songs by Jeanine Tesori and clever staging by director Michael Mayer..." Foster went on to win the 2002 Tony Award for Best Leading Actress in a Musical, the Drama Desk Award for Outstanding Actress in a Musical, and the Outer Critics Circle Award for Outstanding Actress in a Musical for her performance. During the run, Foster appeared in concert versions of Chess and Funny Girl, before leaving in 2004.

Upon leaving, Foster did a concert version of Snoopy! The Musical and returned to the Pittsburgh Civic Light Opera for a production of Me and My Girl to wrap up the year. In May 2005, Foster co-starred as Jo March opposite Maureen McGovern as Marmee in the musical adaptation of Louisa May Alcott's classic novel Little Women, for which she was nominated for her second Tony Award. The production closed after just a few months. She returned to Broadway at the Marquis Theatre in May 2006 in The Drowsy Chaperone, a spoof of 1920s musicals. She played Janet van de Graaff, a famous Broadway starlet who opts to forgo a stage career in favor of married life. The musical had a pre-Broadway run at the Ahmanson Theatre, Los Angeles in November to December 2005. Her performance earned her a third Tony nomination. Foster left the musical in 2007 and co-starred in Mel Brooks' musical adaptation of his film Young Frankenstein as the yodeling fräulein Inga, first at the Paramount Theatre and then on Broadway from October 2007 to July 2008.

In 2007, Foster guest-starred on the children's musical puppet show Johnny and the Sprites and in a three-episode story arc on the HBO sitcom Flight of the Conchords. She left the show to play Princess Fiona in Shrek the Musical, which opened on Broadway on December 14, 2008. For this role, Foster won her second Outer Critics Circle Award for Outstanding Actress in a Musical and was nominated for her fourth Tony Award for Best Performance by a Leading Actress in a Musical. She played her final performance on January 3, 2010, when the show closed on Broadway. Foster participated in a reading of a work-in-progress new musical, Bonnie and Clyde: A Folktale, in June 2009. Her brother, Hunter is writing the music for this musical.

Foster's debut solo album Wish was released by Ghostlight Records in February 2009. The songs range from jazz to pop to cabaret to Broadway. In 2010, Foster promoted the album with concert performances in Boston, New York City, Chicago, the Orange County Performing Arts Center in Orange County, California, and Washington, D.C. Foster starred as Nurse Fay Apple in the New York City Center's Encores! production of Anyone Can Whistle, which played from April 8 to 11, 2010. Foster made her Off-Broadway debut in Paul Weitz's comedy Trust with Zach Braff, Bobby Cannavale and Ari Graynor which began previews July 23, 2010, with an official opening August 12, running through September 12, 2010, at Second Stage Theatre. Foster and Seth Rudetsky participated in the one night only Actors Fund benefit concert version of They're Playing Our Song on August 30, 2010, at the Gerald W. Lynch Theater, John Jay College, New York. The full cast included Efé, Kaitlyn Davidson, Alex Ellis, Maynard, Matt Loehr, and Jesse Nager, and was directed by Denis Jones.

Foster taught a Spring Semester master class at New York University's Tisch School of the Arts Undergraduate Department of Drama, beginning in January 2010. It culminated in a cabaret performance at Joe's Pub in May titled "From Rodgers To Heart". She taught the master class again in Fall Semester 2010, culminating in another performance at Joe's Pub, "Crazy for Gershwin". Both were musically directed by Deborah Abramson. She is now on the faculty of NYU's New Studio on Broadway. Foster taught a week-long master class session at Ball State University (Muncie, IN) in January 2010. She continued her relationship with Ball State in September 2010 by working with students in the classroom, teaching master classes, and performing workshops for students of the Department of Theatre and Dance. She also guest-starred in an episode of the NBC legal drama Law & Order: SVU (opposite comedian Kathy Griffin), which aired on March 3, 2010.

Foster performed at the 33rd Annual Kennedy Center Honors in a tribute to Jerry Herman, singing "Before the Parade Passes By." She performed at the Kennedy Center Honors the following year in a tribute to Barbara Cook. She made a third appearance at the Kennedy Center Honors in 2013, performing for the tribute to Shirley MacLaine. Foster performed a concert tour, An Evening With Sutton Foster from September 2010 to May 2011, performing songs from both her Broadway career and her solo album.

=== 2011–2014: Anything Goes and branching out ===
Foster played Reno Sweeney in the Broadway revival of Anything Goes, which began performances on March 10, 2011, at the Stephen Sondheim Theatre and officially opened on April 7, 2011. Foster won her third Outer Critics Circle Award and second Drama Desk Award and Tony Award for her performance. Foster's final performance was on March 11, 2012, when she was replaced by Stephanie J. Block. Foster left to film the television comedy-drama Bunheads, which premiered on ABC Family on June 11, 2012. Foster played the lead role in this short-lived 2012 ABC Family drama, developed by Amy Sherman-Palladino, the creator of Gilmore Girls. She played former Las Vegas showgirl Michelle, who impulsively marries a man, moves to his small town, and begins teaching ballet lessons at her new mother-in-law's dance studio. She won the Gracie Award and received a nomination at the 3rd Critics' Choice Television Awards for Best Actress in a Comedy Series. The series was cancelled after a single season.

In the spring of 2012, she returned to Ball State, teaching classes, mentoring the interdisciplinary team that wrote the musical The Circus in Winter, and co-directing the Department of Theatre and Dance's Spring 2012 production of The Drowsy Chaperone; she also spoke at commencement and received an Honorary Doctorate of Fine Arts degree for her continued engagement with Ball State students. Foster continued her relationship with Ball State in October 2012, performing in the staged reading of The Circus in Winter at the National Alliance for Musical Theatre's Festival of New Musicals at New World Stages in New York. In 2013, Foster guest starred in an episode of Psych and starred as Kerry in actor James Roday's comedic thriller Gravy. In 2014, she appeared opposite Robin Williams in the comedy The Angriest Man in Brooklyn. From March to August 2014, Foster starred in the Roundabout Theatre Company production of the musical Violet at the American Airlines Theatre. Foster received her sixth Tony Award nomination for her performance.

=== 2015–present: Younger, London debut, and Broadway return ===
She made her Carnegie Hall debut in April 2015, with guest appearances from Joshua Henry and Megan McGinnis. This was part of a new tour effort An Evening With Sutton Foster: Broadway In Concert, which continued through 2016. She returned to Encores! in July 2015 to play Queenie in Andrew Lippa's The Wild Party. She later was cast as the lead character of Liza Miller in the TV Land single-camera comedy-drama pilot Younger, created by Darren Star. It was originally set to be released January 13, 2015, but she stated on January 31 in an interview at TETA TheatreFest 2015 in Houston, Texas that the release was delayed. The series premiered on March 31, 2015, and was renewed for a second season, which began airing in January 2016, shortly after it was renewed for a third season, set for a release at the end of the year. In July 2016, season three began filming, and the series was renewed for a fourth season. Season three aired to positive reviews in late 2016, and season 4 aired in summer 2017 with further positive reviews.

In 2016, she starred opposite Aaron Tveit and Betty Buckley in the Stephen Schwartz revue Defying Gravity in Australia. She appeared in the Off-Broadway revival of Sweet Charity as Charity Hope Valentine at the Pershing Square Signature Center from November 2, 2016 (previews) to January 8, 2017. Also in 2016, Foster played the role of Violet in the miniseries Gilmore Girls: A Year in the Life opposite her ex-husband, Christian Borle. The two perform a musical within the Summer episode about the history of Stars Hollow. She appeared on the game show Match Game, broadcast on ABC in June 2016. She also made guest appearances on The Good Wife and Mad Dogs. In 2017, she once again returned to Ball State, this time to co-direct the Department of Theatre and Dance's Spring production of Shrek: The Musical. During December 2017, she performed as a guest artist for the Mormon Tabernacle Choir's annual Christmas concerts. In December 2017, Foster and Jonathan Groff performed a selection of songs from many shows at The Appel Room at Lincoln Center; this concert, which also featured Megan McGinnis and Darcie Roberts, aired on PBS's "Live From Lincoln Center" on April 20, 2018.

From July through October 2021, Foster made her London theatre debut reprising her role as Reno Sweeney in Anything Goes at the Barbican Theatre, earning rave reviews from British critics. For her performance, Foster was nominated for the Laurence Olivier Award for Best Actress in a Musical. The production was broadcast in UK cinemas on 28 November and 1 December 2021. The recorded performance also played at US cinemas on March 27 and 30, 2022, and later aired on the PBS series Great Performances.

In October 2021, Foster published a memoir, Hooked, in which she opens up about how she used crafts, specifically cross-stitching, collaging and crocheting, to get through significantly challenging milestones in her life. She shares how using crafts as creative outlets helped her deal with painful experiences in her life and remain present and resilient. In 2019, she crocheted an octopus toilet paper cover for Younger costar Hilary Duff's wedding.

In December 2021, she returned to Broadway, starring as Marian Paroo opposite Hugh Jackman as Harold Hill in a revival of The Music Man. For her performance, Foster received her seventh nomination for the Tony Award for Best Actress in a Musical and also won the Drama League Award for Distinguished Performance. The production played its final performance on January 15, 2023. As of March 2023, she is currently on the faculty of Ball State University as an instructor of theatre, focusing on internships. In February 2024, she replaced Annaleigh Ashford in the Broadway revival of Sweeney Todd: The Demon Barber of Fleet Street as Mrs. Lovett. She starred in the production for a 12-week limited engagement opposite Aaron Tveit as Todd. Foster starred as Princess Winnifred in a concert production of Once Upon a Mattress as part of the New York City Center Encores! series. In May 2024, it was announced that the production would transfer to Broadway's Hudson Theatre for a limited engagement lasting from July through November, with an additional four-week engagement playing at the Ahmanson Theatre in Los Angeles in December. Foster's performance earned her a nomination for the Drama Desk Award for Outstanding Lead Performance in a Musical. She is currently set to star in a stage musical adaptation of Coal Miner's Daughter.

== Personal life ==
Foster met actor Christian Borle in college, and married him on September 18, 2006. Although they divorced in 2009, Foster and Borle remain friends and continue to support each other's work. Following her divorce, she dated her Trust co-star Bobby Cannavale from 2011 to 2012. On September 19, 2013, Foster confirmed she was engaged to screenwriter Ted Griffin. She and Griffin married on October 25, 2014. In April 2017, Foster announced that the couple had adopted a baby girl, Emily, born March 5, 2017. Foster filed for divorce from Griffin in October 2024. As of 2025, she is in a relationship with The Music Man co-star Hugh Jackman. Foster and Jackman made their official red carpet debut as a couple at the Los Angeles premiere of Jackman's film Song Sung Blue.

Foster is a dog lover and has had three dogs since her Broadway debut: Linus, Mabel, and Brody.

She makes artwork which she sells online and occasionally at art exhibits. She has collaborated with visual artist Julien Havard, who previously worked as her dresser for nine years, beginning with Thoroughly Modern Millie.

== Acting credits ==
=== Film ===
Year	Title	Role	Notes
1989	Mr. Terbillion's Ambition	Sarah	Short film
2008	Just in Case	Boy (voice)	
2013	Shrek the Musical	Princess Fiona	Filmed stage production
2014	The Angriest Man in Brooklyn	Adela	
2014	The Nobodies	Amy	Short film
2015	Gravy	Kerry	
2016	Mired	Wife (voice)	Short film
2021	Anything Goes	Reno Sweeney	Filmed stage production
TBA	Rule Of Three †	TBA	

Key
†	Denotes films that have not yet been released

=== Television ===
Year	Title	Role	Notes
1990	Star Search	Herself/contestant	Runner-up (3.5 stars)
2007	Johnny and the Sprites	Tina	Episode: "Johnny's Sister Tina/Spritesgiving!"
2007	Flight of the Conchords	Coco	3 episodes
2008	The Battery's Down	Sutton Foster	Episode: "I Think I'm Gonna Like it Here"
2010	Law & Order: Special Victims Unit	Rosemary	Episode: "P.C."
2011–12	Sesame Street	Self	2 episodes
2012	Royal Pains	Julie Sharp	Episode: "Bottoms Up"
2012–13	Bunheads	Michelle Simms	Lead role; 18 episodes
2013–20	Doc McStuffins	Frida Fairy Flyer (voice)	4 episodes
2014	Psych	Gretchen Eikleberry	Episode: "A Nightmare on State Street"
2014	Say Yes to the Dress	Self	Episode: "A Dress Like None the Rest"
2015–21	Younger	Liza Miller	Lead role; 84 episodes
2015	Elementary	Tara Parker	Episode: "Absconded"
2016	Mad Dogs	Gerda	Episode: "Broodstock"
2016	The Good Wife	Witness	Episode: "End"
2016	Match Game	Herself	Episode #1.1
2016	Gilmore Girls: A Year in the Life	Violet	Episode: "Summer"
2018	Instinct	Celia Walker	Episode: "Bye Bye Birdie"
2019	Into the Dark	Lauren	Episode: "Treehouse"
2020	A Million Little Things	Chloe	Episode: "Guilty"
2020	What Would You Do?	Herself	Season 16, episode 6
2020	Vampirina	Bora O'Grave (voice)	Episode: "Bora the Banshee"
2021–2023	Ridley Jones	Sarah Jones / Mrs. Sanchez (voice)	16 episodes
2022–2023	Solar Opposites	Sister Sisto, Tracy Johnson, Realtor (voice)	9 episodes
2023	The Marvelous Mrs. Maisel	Carole	Episode: "A House Full of Extremely Lame Horses"

=== Theatre ===
Year	Title	Role	Venue	Notes	Ref.
1992	The Will Rogers Follies	Ensemble	Various	National Tour	
1995	Grease	Sandy Dumbrowski (replacement)	Various	National tour	
1996	Grease	Sandy Dumbrowski (replacement)	Eugene O'Neill Theatre	Broadway	
1997	Annie	Various roles	Martin Beck Theatre	Broadway	
1997	The Scarlet Pimpernel	Ensemble	Minskoff Theatre	Broadway	
1998	What the World Needs Now	Jennifer	Old Globe Theatre	London	
1999	Les Misérables	Eponine (replacement)	Various	National Tour	
2000	Dorian	Sister Claire	Goodspeed Musicals	World Premiere	
2000	Les Misérables	Eponine (replacement)	Imperial Theatre	Broadway	
2000	Thoroughly Modern Millie	Millie Dilmount	La Jolla Playhouse	Los Angeles	
2001	The 3hree Musketeers	Constance	American Musical Theatre	San Jose	
2001	South Pacific	Nellie Forbush	Civil Light Opera	Pittsburgh	
2002–2004	Thoroughly Modern Millie	Millie Dilmount	Marquis Theatre	Broadway	
2002	Funny Girl	Fanny Brice	New Amsterdam Theatre	Concert	
2003	Chess	Svetlana	New Amsterdam Theatre	Concert	
2004	Snoopy! The Musical	Peppermint Patty	Symphony Space	Benefit Concert	
2004	Me and My Girl	Sally Smith	Civil Light Opera	Pittsburgh	
2005	Little Women	Jo March	Virginia Theatre	Broadway	
2005	The Drowsy Chaperone	Janet Van de Graaf	Ahmanson Theatre	Los Angeles	
2006–07	The Drowsy Chaperone	Janet Van de Graaf	Marquis Theatre	Broadway	
2007	Young Frankenstein	Inga	Paramount Theatre	Seattle	
2007–2008	Young Frankenstein	Inga	Hilton Theatre	Broadway	
2008	Shrek the Musical	Princess Fiona	5th Avenue Theatre	Seattle	
2008–2010	Shrek the Musical	Princess Fiona	Broadway Theatre	Broadway	
2010	Anyone Can Whistle	Nurse Fay Apple	New York City Center	Encores!	
2010	They're Playing Our Song	Sonia Walsk	Gerald W. Lynch Theatre	Concert	
2010	Trust	Prudence	Second Stage Theatre	Off-Broadway	
2011–2012	Anything Goes	Reno Sweeney	Stephen Sondheim Theatre	Broadway	
2013	Violet	Violet Karl	New York City Center	Encores!	
2014	Violet	Violet Karl	American Airlines Theatre	Broadway	
2015	The Wild Party	Queenie	New York City Center	Encores!	
2016	Defying Gravity: The Songs of Stephen Schwartz	Performer	Theatre Royal	Sydney	
2016–2017	Sweet Charity	Charity Hope Valentine	Signature Theatre	Off-Broadway	
2018	Thoroughly Modern Millie	Millie Dilmount	Minskoff Theatre	Reunion Concert	
2018	My One and Only	Edythe Herbert	Stephen Sondheim Theatre	Benefit	
2019	Into the Woods	The Baker's Wife	Hollywood Bowl	Los Angeles	
2021	Anything Goes	Reno Sweeney	Barbican Theatre	London	
2021–2023	The Music Man	Marian Paroo	Winter Garden Theatre	Broadway	
2024	Once Upon a Mattress	Princess Winnifred	New York City Center	Encores!	
2024	Sweeney Todd: The Demon Barber of Fleet Street	Mrs. Lovett (replacement)	Lunt-Fontanne Theatre	Broadway	
2024	Once Upon a Mattress	Princess Winnifred	Hudson Theatre	Broadway	
2024–2025	Once Upon a Mattress	Princess Winnifred	Ahmanson Theatre	Los Angeles	
2025	Trisha Paytas' Big Broadway Dream!	Herself (One night only)	St. James Theatre	Broadway	

== Awards and nominations ==
Over her career, she has been recognized multiple times by either the Tony Awards or Laurence Olivier Awards for her work on the Broadway stage and London theatre, for:

- 56th Tony Awards: Best Actress in a Musical, win for Thoroughly Modern Millie in 2002
- 59th Tony Awards: Best Actress in a Musical, nom for Little Women in 2005
- 60th Tony Awards: Best Actress in a Musical, nom for The Drowsy Chaperone in 2006
- 63rd Tony Awards: Best Actress in a Musical, nom for Shrek the Musical in 2009
- 65th Tony Awards: Best Actress in a Musical, win for Anything Goes in 2011
- 68th Tony Awards: Best Actress in a Musical, nom for Violet in 2014
- 75th Tony Awards: Best Actress in a Musical, nom for The Music Man in 2022
- 2022 Laurence Olivier Awards: Best Actress in a Musical, nom for Anything Goes in 2022

== Discography ==
- Wish (2009)
- An Evening with Sutton Foster: Live at the Café Carlyle (2011)
- Take Me to the World (2018)

Tours

- An Evening with Sutton Foster (2010–11)
- An Evening with Sutton Foster: Broadway in Concert (2015–16)
- An Evening with Sutton Foster (2025–26)
