= Bunheads =

American comedy-drama television series

- Genre: Comedy drama
- Created by: Amy Sherman-Palladino & Lamar Damon
- Starring: Sutton Foster; Kaitlyn Jenkins; Julia Goldani Telles; Bailey Buntain; Emma Dumont
- Theme music composer: Sam Phillips
- Composer: Sam Phillips
- Country of origin: United States
- Original language: English
- No. of seasons: 1
- No. of episodes: 18

Production
- Executive producers: Amy Sherman-Palladino; John Ziffren
- Producers: Maria L. Melograne; Salli Newman; Daniel Palladino; Tim Marx; Amy Welsh; Sheila Lawrence; David Hartle; Helen Pai
- Cinematography: Anette Haellmigk; Alex Nepomniaschy
- Editors: Jill Savitt; Raul Dávalos; Mark Hartzell
- Camera setup: Single-camera
- Running time: 42 minutes
- Production company: Dorothy Parker Drank Here Productions

Original release
- Network: ABC Family
- Release: June 11, 2012 – February 25, 2013

Bunheads is an American comedy drama television series created by Amy Sherman-Palladino and Lamar Damon that aired on ABC Family from June 11, 2012, to February 25, 2013. Starring Sutton Foster, the show centers on a Las Vegas showgirl who gets married on a whim and winds up teaching alongside her new mother-in-law at her ballet school. On July 22, 2013, ABC Family canceled the series after one season.

== Premise ==
Bunheads is the tale of Michelle Simms, a former 'bunhead' (slang for ballerina) who wound up as a Las Vegas showgirl. Seeing her life and career at a dead end, she impulsively takes up the offer of marriage from her persistent admirer, Hubbell Flowers, and moves to his sleepy coastal town, the fictional town of Paradise, California, halfway between Ojai and Oxnard (unlike the real-world town by that name). Once there, Hubbell is killed in a car accident and Michelle struggles to adjust to life in a small town and teaching alongside her mother-in-law, Fanny Flowers, at her ballet school, Paradise Dance Academy.

== Cast and characters ==
=== Main ===
The cast of Bunheads

- Sutton Foster as Michelle Simms Flowers: A Las Vegas chorus girl who reluctantly marries kindly Hubbell Flowers to escape her life. Soon, though, she realizes that he is actually a good person and begins to enjoy her new life until the latter's death.
- Kaitlyn Jenkins as Bettina "Boo" Jordan
- Julia Goldani Telles as Sasha Torres
- Bailey Buntain as Virginia "Ginny" Thompson
- Emma Dumont as Melanie "Mel" Segal

=== Recurring ===
- Kelly Bishop as Fanny Flowers, Hubbell's mother
- Stacey Oristano as Truly Stone, Hubbell's former girlfriend
- Liza Weil as Millicent "Milly" Stone
- Gregg Henry as Rico
- Dendrie Taylor as Nina
- Moises Parra as Moises
- Rose Abdoo as Sam
- Julie Claire as Anastasia Torres
- Ellen Greene as Fanny's Friend
- RaJahnae Patterson as RaJahnae
- Casey J. Adler as Carl Cramer
- Paul James Jordan as Dez
- Zak Henri as Charlie Segal
- Matisse Love as Matisse
- Richard Gant as Michael
- Angelina McCoy as Talia, Michelle's friend who is a dancer in Las Vegas
- Jennifer Hasty as Nanette
- Brad Ellis as Brad
- Alan Ruck as Hubbell Flowers, Michelle's persistent admirer, and subsequently, her husband.
- Nathan Parsons as Godot
- Garrett Coffey as Roman
- Hunter Foster as Scotty Simms
- Jeanine Mason as Cozette
- Niko Pepaj as Frankie
- Kent Boyd as Jordan
- Victoria Park as Aubrey
- Gabriel Notarangelo as Josh
- Kiersten Warren as Claire Thompson
- Steven Eckholdt as Grant
- Jayden Maddux as Dougie

=== Cameos ===
In addition to recurring actors that carried over from Gilmore Girls, including Kelly Bishop, Liza Weil, Gregg Henry, and Rose Abdoo, numerous other known actors, as well as Broadway actors, also appeared in episodes of Bunheads.

- Alex Borstein, who played Drella the harpist and Miss Celine, as Michelle's landlord in episode 1 and as Carl's Mother in episode 12.
- Alex Ko, who played Alex, a dancer in episode 3.
- Michael DeLuise, who played "TJ", as the magician "Jo Jo Deline" in episode 11.
- Sean Gunn, who played Kirk Gleason, as the over-zealous barista Bash in episodes 9 and 17.
- Chris Eigeman, who played Jason Stiles, as actor/director Conor in episode 8.
- Todd Lowe, who played Zach van Gerbig, as the one-eyed plumber Davis in episode 7.
- Biff Yeager, who played Tom the contractor, as Bob the hardware store owner in episodes 4 and 15.
- Linda Porter, who played Fran Westin, as Sasha's neighbor Mrs. Weidemeyer in episode 15.
- Jon Polito, who played Pete, owner of Pete's Pizza, as Sal Russano in episodes 5, 9, and 16.
- Kalani Hilliker, who played a dancer

== Episodes ==
No.	Title	Directed by	Written by	Original release date	US viewers (millions)
1	"Pilot"	Amy Sherman-Palladino	Story by : Lamar Damon & Amy Sherman-Palladino; Teleplay by : Amy Sherman-Palladino	June 11, 2012	1.64
Tired of her life as a chorus girl in Las Vegas, Michelle Simms reluctantly agrees to marry kindly Hubbell Flowers, who loves her and promises to give her a better life. He brings her to his small hometown, where she is not exactly greeted with open arms. Hubbell's overbearing mother, Fanny, is appalled by the news of their marriage and frowns upon the idea of Michelle's moving in with them. Fanny hosts a wedding reception, where Michelle interacts with the colorful locals, who all seem to despise her. The only people Michelle makes a good impression on are Fanny's ballet students, who are impressed with her dance experience. Boo takes Michelle's advice on auditioning to heart and feels inspired to try out for a prestigious local performance. Out of nowhere, Michelle's unstable new life is rocked when Hubbell dies in a car accident.
2	"For Fanny"	Amy Sherman-Palladino	Amy Sherman-Palladino	June 18, 2012	1.64
Following Hubbell's death, Michelle and Fanny remain in a catatonic state for the first night. Meanwhile, after Sasha Torres, Melanie Segal, Ginny Thompson, and Bettina "Boo" Jordan find out about Hubbell's accident, they "grieve" by skipping school and watching a movie. Boo is upset with how the girls handle the situation, criticizing their lack of sympathy. Back at the house, Fanny becomes obsessed with organizing the perfect memorial for her son: a tent to hold the entire town, Buddhist memorial traditions, a mariachi band and cocktail napkins with the face of the Dalai Lama, to name a few. Later, Fanny comforts Truly Stone as she breaks down - saying a few choice words in front of Michelle. Feeling lost, Michelle takes a long walk around town, then confronts Fanny about being included in the grieving process. Later, nothing seems to be going like Fanny wants for the memorial service. So at the dance studio, Michelle teaches the girls and the rest of the class to perform for Fanny in honor of Hubbell. Fanny is touched. But just when it looks like Michelle and Fanny are making progress, they learn that before his death, Hubbell changed his will. Everything is now in Michelle's name.
3	"Inherit the Wind"	Kenny Ortega	Sarah Dunn	June 25, 2012	1.38
Fanny melodramatically pouts about Hubbell's assets being left to Michelle. Michelle is visited by a pushy real estate agent, Clair, who shows her around the seven-acre estate and scares Michelle with horror stories of required maintenance. Frustrated, Michelle finds Hubbell's restored Mustang convertible in a garage and takes it for a drive; when it breaks down, she meets the mysterious and rich Grant who lives on a large estate. While telling Grant she has no reason to stay in Paradise, Michelle receives a text from the girls; her reaction shows the viewer she's forming a relationship with them. Melanie's older brother comes to a dance practice; Boo has a crush on him and is embarrassed by Sasha. As the girls are picked up, it's revealed Boo has a down-to-earth, loving mother while Sasha's is cold and aloof. Michelle later finds Sasha practicing alone in the studio at night. Michelle finds that the estate has a guest house and decides to move into it.
4	"Better Luck Next Year"	Daniel Palladino	Daniel Palladino	July 9, 2012	1.44
A moving truck arrives with everything that was in Michelle's apartment in Vegas, including things that were not hers, as her landlord packed for her. Not having enough space for the things to be nicely put away, Michelle shoves them into the guesthouse and goes to sleep. Fanny wakes up Michelle in the middle of the night to talk and help her unpack and agrees to let Michelle "borrow" her stove, as the kitchen in the guest house does not function. The next morning, Michelle gets caught eating chips and soda in her underwear by some of the ballet students.
5	"Money for Nothing"	Elodie Keene	Amy Welsh	July 16, 2012	1.23
It's Fanny's paying season, where she categorizes all her debts into boxes − people who have to get paid, people who should get paid, and people who might get paid - and pays some of them accordingly. Many townspeople are aware of Fanny's system and refuse to do business with her until they get paid. Michelle takes Fanny to an accountant to help sort out her finances, but the accountant informs them that they need to bring in some income, because only a few students at the dancing school actually pay for the classes. Fanny and Michelle discuss adding classes, and Fanny pressures Michelle to teach with her. Michelle tries to get all the parents to pay, but it backfires, so Fanny, Michelle, and the dancers put on a recital that placates the people Fanny owes money. Boo starts a new job at the Oyster Bar, where she has to deal with another waiter who makes her jump in the dumpster, which leaves her smelling like garbage. The handsome surfer son of the owners, Godot, befriends Boo and helps her navigate the job to the envy of Boo's friends.
6	"Movie Truck"	Jamie Babbit	Amy Sherman-Palladino & Beth Schacter	July 23, 2012	1.58
Fanny takes off on an impromptu vacation, forcing Michelle to teach all of her classes. This in turn disrupts her weekend plans: her best friend from Las Vegas, Talia, is visiting to celebrate Michelle's birthday. Meanwhile, the younger girls have a sleepover at Sasha's and sneak out to watch a rated-R movie where Boo tries to get Melanie's brother, Charlie, to pay attention to her. Michelle and Talia ultimately invite Truly to join them, but find little to do in town, and end up at the same movie. The girls don't make it back to Sasha's house before the alarm is set at midnight, and Sasha damages her mother's car attempting to break in.
7	"What's Your Damage, Heather"	Jackson Douglas	Grant Levy, Dominik Rothbard & Amy Sherman-Palladino	July 30, 2012	1.12
Michelle grudgingly teaches Fanny's classes, only to find out that Fanny extended her trip by another week. There's a leak in the girls' dressing room in the dance studio, causing a re-location into Michelle's house (the guest house), where the girls go through her stuff, including Sasha, who steals one of Michelle's shirts given to her by Siegfried and Roy and lies to Michelle about it. Ginny, wanting to "test the waters", dumps her boyfriend of 8 years, much to the anger of her mother, who berates Michelle in front of everyone after class. Nanette, Boo's mother, calms her down with cookies and grape juice. Meanwhile, Truly introduces Michelle to the infamous Davis, a local plumber with one eye, who is never hired for plumbing work.
8	"Blank Up, It’s Time"	Daniel Palladino	Daniel Palladino	August 6, 2012	1.17
Fanny returns with an old friend, Michael, a pianist and troubadour. Fanny invites Michelle to see a play written by a local entitled "Blank Up, It's Time." Michelle meets the director. In the meantime, Fanny's academy is preparing for a series of upcoming events and dance numbers, including a Fred Astaire and Ginger Rogers number, which usually stars Sasha and a talented, egotistical male dance student, Jordan. This time, due to "disagreements," Sasha has been replaced with Boo, and Jordan with an underdog male student, Carl.
9	"No One Takes Khaleesi's Dragons"	David Paymer	Sheila Lawrence	August 13, 2012	1.13
Frustrated with long lines and exasperating service at the only coffee shop in town, Michelle looks forward to the opening of a new grocery store with modern accouterments, including coffee service. Boo and Carl (whom Boo likes more each day) rehearse an Astaire and Rogers dance routine to perform at the store's opening. When the store's opening is derailed by local citizens, Michelle tries to convince them to change their minds. During her campaign, she meets the town heartthrob, Godot, a bartender and surfer significantly younger than her. Meanwhile, Ginny develops a crush on Melanie's brother, Charlie, much to Melanie's disapproval, due to Boo's old (un-reciprocated) feelings for him. Carl plans to quit ballet as he thinks he has no future in it, to Boo's disappointment. Sasha joins the high school cheerleading squad, where she does not fit in. Michelle tells her that making one mistake while she is young can ruin her life.
10	"A Nutcracker in Paradise"	Amy Sherman-Palladino	Amy Sherman-Palladino	August 20, 2012	1.50
Sasha decides to rejoin Paradise Dance Academy in time for their famous productions of The Nutcracker reprising her usual role as "Clara," the lead. Before Fanny knew Sasha was back, she hired a professional dancer from San Francisco, "The Ringer," to play "Clara." This creates hostility between the two lead dancers. Michelle helps Ginny, Melanie, and Boo make up from their argument. Boo is still pining for Carl, and Sasha meets a boy from the basketball team when she was a cheerleader. Bad luck ensues the night of The Nutcracker's first show, starting with Fanny's 30-year-long relationship with Michael and ending with an accident backstage - Michelle macing all of the dancers - having almost everyone end up in the hospital. After a dream in which Hubbell informs her that she was meant to shake things up in Paradise, Michelle decides to leave Paradise. When leaving the hospital all the kids stand on chairs and say "O Captain! My Captain!"
11	"You Wanna See Something?"	Amy Sherman-Palladino	Amy Sherman-Palladino	January 7, 2013	1.23
Several months after the disastrous Nutcracker performance, the studio is closed and everyone has scattered to the winds. No one is dancing except Michelle in a dreary magician's show on the outskirts of Las Vegas while she camps out on Talia's couch. The girls, meanwhile, deal with the chaos of their lives, and Sasha's return from Joffrey creates more when she refuses to go back home.
12	"Channing Tatum Is a Fine Actor"	Daniel Palladino	Daniel Palladino	January 14, 2013	1.07
Truly is evicted from her shop; Carl insists that Boo meet his parents; Talia sets Michelle up on a blind date; the girls are intrigued by two talented young newcomers.
13	"I'll Be Your Meyer Lansky"	Jackson Douglas	Beth Schacter	January 21, 2013	1.13
Michelle and Fanny attempt to drum up income; the girls continue to be enchanted by the new students. Note: Kaitlyn Jenkins as Bettina "Boo" Jordan was absent from this episode.
14	"The Astronaut and the Ballerina"	Daniel Palladino	Amy Sherman-Palladino & Daniel Palladino	January 28, 2013	1.12
Michelle's brother, Scotty, visits following another failed marriage; Ginny feels abandoned after Melanie develops an interest in roller derby; child-care duties keep Boo and Carl busy.
15	"Take the Vicuna"	Chris Eigeman	Sheila Lawrence	February 4, 2013	1.09
Milly offers unwelcome opinions on Fanny's dance recital; Michelle and her brother have an unexpected encounter during a road trip; Sasha holds a housewarming party.
16	"There's Nothing Worse Than a Pantsuit"	David Paymer	Grant Levy & Dominik Rothbard	February 11, 2013	0.97
Michelle and Milly battle the town preservation society for the new amphitheater; Sasha and Roman go public with their relationship; Talia reveals big news.
17	"It's Not a Mint"	Daniel Palladino	Daniel Palladino	February 18, 2013	1.12
Michelle and Bash turn the dance studio into an evacuation center when a nearby fire threatens the town; as well as Talia's plans. Many couples and people grow closer; from Roman and Sasha to Truly and Milly. Michelle has an awkward talk with the girls.
18	"Next!"	Amy Sherman-Palladino	Amy Sherman-Palladino	February 25, 2013	1.01
Michelle auditions for a show in Los Angeles. Meanwhile, Sasha and Boo think about taking their respective relationships to the next level. On hearing news of these developments, Fanny stages an awkward lecture with her class.

== Production ==
=== Development ===
Bunheads first appeared on the development slate at ABC Family in September 2010, under the title Strut, when the show received a cast-contingent pilot order. Lamar Damon wrote the script, and production was originally expected to begin in fall 2010. In September 2011, it was reported that the series was being retooled by Amy Sherman-Palladino, who would serve as executive producer. Originally ABC had been looking for their own answer to the musical series Glee but Palladino suggested going in another direction and doing a series in the world of ballet. The series was given a pilot order under the new name Bunheads.

=== Casting ===
On September 28, 2011, it was announced that Broadway star Sutton Foster was set to star in the lead role as Michelle. On February 11, 2012, ABC Family ordered the pilot to series with a ten episode order. Following shortly, on February 15, 2012, it was announced that Kelly Bishop would join the show playing the recurring role of Fanny Flowers, the mother-in-law to Michelle.

=== Filming ===
Filming took place in November with creator Amy Sherman-Palladino writing and directing.

=== Music ===
It was announced on June 9, 2012, that singer-songwriter and Gilmore Girls composer Sam Phillips would score the music to Bunheads.

=== Renewal and cancellation ===
On August 17, 2012, Bunheads received a renewal for the "back end" of the first season (eight additional episodes). Bunheads returned on January 7, 2013, after Switched at Birth. On June 4, 2013, it was announced that Bunheads was one of 31 selected productions to receive California's Film and Television Tax Credit. Earning $5.82 million, the money would help fund a second season should the show be renewed. On July 4, 2013, it was announced that the sets were torn down, leading some reporters to speculate that the show would be canceled. ABC Family later confirmed that it was officially cancelled on July 22, 2013.

== Reception ==
=== Critical response ===
Critics gave a very positive reception to the show, specifically praising Amy Sherman-Palladino's distinct writing and the performances of leading ladies Sutton Foster and Kelly Bishop. Robert Lloyd of Los Angeles Times thought "ABC Family's Bunheads a cute summer treat. Amy Sherman-Palladino strikes again with that Gilmore Girls charm in Bunheads, with Tony-winning Sutton Foster as a former showgirl mentoring budding ballerinas." Variety's Geoff Berkshire said "Sherman-Palladino's snappy banter and slightly melancholic characters only enrich the texture of a series perfectly pitched between comedy and drama." The Huffington Post's Maureen Ryan recommended the show saying "the pilot for Bunheads moves at a brisk, refreshing clip and it even packs an emotional wallop or two. The relationships that are sketched out in the first hour are promising. Sherman-Palladino has long been interested in characters who are dancing as fast as they can, and in this show, she has a whole new set to play with." Vanity Fair's James Wolcott titled the show a "knockout charmer" and singled out particular praise for lead Sutton Foster "revealing a knowing Carol Burnett-ish clowning flair that works beautifully on camera."

Newsday critic Diane Werts noted that "Bunheads set [a] multigenerational tone," and praised Sherman-Palladino's style. "Think they've all got a way with words? Some attitude? Smart pop-culture shout-outs? You betcha. Bunheads is from Gilmore Girls auteur Amy Sherman-Palladino, so it chatters just as giddily, from Gadhafi to Godzilla to Graceland." HitFix's Alan Sepinwall called "ABC Family's Bunheads a return to form for Amy Sherman-Palladino." and Time's James Poniewozik, though showing some minor concern for the series plot going forward, suggested, "What matters is its voice, and the spring in its step, and its first hour was just so damn enjoyable that I'll gladly season-pass this and see where the season takes it. Out of the gate, Bunheads had some impressive moves; I look forward to trying to keep up." Ken Tucker of Entertainment Weekly said in his review of the pilot, "Summer TV just got dreamier, dancier...Sherman-Palladino has constructed Bunheads cannily to both fit into and transcend ABC Family's programming." On the mixed front, David Wiegand of the San Francisco Chronicle thought Bunheads "will take some work and it could just as easily become either annoying or likable."

Popular entertainment website The A.V. Club ranked Bunheads number 15 on their annual "The Best TV of 2012" list writing "At its best, Bunheads scavenges real heart out of its flea-market approach to plot and character. When Foster breathes “The re-usable tote!” and Kelly Bishop replies with satisfaction, “The re-usable tote,” it's time to be thankful Sherman-Palladino is back in business." The New Yorker's Emily Nussbaum included Bunheads among her favorite television shows of 2012, listing the Istanbul (Not Constantinople) dance number closing episode six as the year's most memorable TV moment, saying: "1. This. Television is always the best when it takes you by surprise. Following the season one finale, TIME's James Poniewozik wrote a piece on the show titled "On the Importance of Bunheads." In it he details Bunheads as a necessity in the TV landscape. "Over its first season, it’s been a joy to watch, funny, charming and bittersweet, and that’s reason enough for me to want it to stay on the air, despite not-great-even-for-ABC-Family ratings. But TV also needs this show to stay on the air, to prove that there are different kinds of stories worth telling outside the usual genres."

Alyssa Rosenberg of ThinkProgress asked "ABC Family, Save Bunheads!" She wrote: "All of this would be enough to make a specific, brilliant, rare show. But Bunheads is something more. Its characters have pop culture addictions that rival Community‘s. It’s the unusual show about women that has good male characters—Carl, Michelle’s maybe-boyfriend bartender Godot, Michelle’s hilariously shiftless brother—but that hasn’t subverted its female characters to their development, creating an unusual degree of gender balance. And it’s a show that’s not afraid of real sadness, but that doesn’t need to beat up on its characters to let them fail: when Michelle accidentally pepper-sprayed her students on the eve of a critically important performance for the school’s financial health, we were allowed to feel the weight of her accumulated past missteps without being disgusted by or feeling distanced from her. That’s a deft balance. And if ABC Family wants to level up on its brand, to be something more than the network where Shailene Woodley worked before she got famous, it should keep it up, and renew Bunheads." Slate magazine's David Weigel explained "Why Bunheads is the best show on TV." In his article, he wrote: "The New York Times has said it on the front page of the Style section, and regular Slate-ster Alyssa Rosenberg has said it eloquently at ThinkProgress. I’ll add my voice: ABC Family needs to renew Amy Sherman-Palladino’s fantastic ballet dramedy Bunheads, the best original, scripted show on TV."

Nearing a decision regarding renewal, on July 17, 2013, several critics dedicated individual articles urging ABC Family to renew Bunheads. Emily St. James of the AV Club wrote an article titled: "Hey, ABC Family: Just renew Bunheads already". In the article she wrote "Fortunately, the qualitative argument is very easy to make for Bunheads. It’s by several orders of magnitude the best show ABC Family has ever aired, and it’s not like that’s an easy task or anything." On Rotten Tomatoes season 1 has an approval rating of 100% based on reviews from 26 critics. On Metacritic season 1 has a score of 74 out of 100 based on reviews from 24 critics.

=== Awards and nominations ===
- 2012 Teen Choice Award for Choice Breakout Star for Sutton Foster (nominated)
- 2013 Thalo's Critics' Choice Inspiration Award for Bunheads (won)
- 2013 Dorian Award for Unsung TV Show of the Year for Bunheads (nominated)
- 2013 Critics' Choice Television Award for Best Actress in a Comedy Series for Sutton Foster (nominated)
- 2013 TCA Award for Outstanding Achievement in Youth Programming for Bunheads (won)
- 2013 Gracie Award for Outstanding Female Actor in a Breakthrough Role for Sutton Foster (won)
