= Don George =

American popular music lyricist

Don R. George (August 27, 1909 – 1987) was an American lyricist of popular music. His songs include "The Yellow Rose of Texas" "I Ain't Got Nothin' But the Blues" (1937), "I'm Beginning to See the Light" (1944) and "Everything but You" (1945). George has also written lyrics for film songs.

He was a personal friend and occasional lyricist of jazz composer Duke Ellington, whom he followed closely from 1943 until Ellington's death in 1974. It was with Ellington that he wrote many of hist best-known songs. George wrote a 1981 biography of Ellington titled Sweet Man: The Real Duke Ellington.
