= Daniel Palladino =

American television producer, screenwriter, and director

Daniel Palladino is an American television executive producer, screenwriter, and director. He is best known for his work on the television series Gilmore Girls (2000–2007) and The Marvelous Mrs. Maisel (2017–2023), which earned him a WGA Award, two PGA Awards, and four Primetime Emmy Awards. He has worked on both series with his wife Amy Sherman Palladino. He also co-created the Amazon Prime Video series Étoile with Sherman-Palladino.

== Career ==
Palladino began working in series television in 1989, spending three years on the ABC program Who's the Boss? starring Tony Danza, Judith Light and Alyssa Milano. Along with stints as a producer of the David Keith series Flesh 'n' Blood and as a writer for an episode of Cheers, Palladino wrote a half-dozen episodes of The Upper Hand, the British version of Who's The Boss?.

Palladino spent two years in the mid-1990s on Roseanne, serving as a writer, co-executive producer, then executive producer.

In 2000 he began a half-dozen years on Gilmore Girls on the WB Television Network. He wrote and eventually segued into directing. Gilmore Girls was the story of a thirty-something single mom (Lauren Graham) who runs an inn in a small Connecticut town while raising her teenage daughter (Alexis Bledel). Time magazine listing it among the "100 Best TV Shows of All Time". He went on to serve in producing roles on such original series as The Return of Jezebel James and the dance drama Bunheads.

Just prior and for a time concurrent with Gilmore Girls, Palladino was executive producer and showrunner of the Fox animated sitcom Family Guy for its initial two seasons, earning an Emmy nomination for Outstanding Animated Program for its second season. From 2012 to 2013, he returned to Family Guy as a consulting producer.

In 2016, Palladino helped navigate the return of Gilmore Girls, to Netflix, writing and directing two of the four installments for Gilmore Girls: A Year in the Life. Much of the cast reunited for the four-part mini-series, with each episode tracing the characters' lives across one season of the year: winter, spring, summer and fall. Palladino served as executive producer, writer and director alongside his wife, series creator Amy Sherman-Palladino.

Palladino then served as executive producer on the Amazon Prime Video pilot The Marvelous Mrs. Maisel. The series went on to win twenty Emmy Awards, including Outstanding Comedy Series, three Golden Globes and five Critics' Choice Awards, as well as the Peabody and WGA award. He is executive producer, writer, and director of the series' fourth season.

== Personal life ==
Palladino is married to writer and director Amy Sherman-Palladino, with whom he frequently collaborates.

== Awards ==
Palladino has received four Primetime Emmy Awards for his work on The Marvelous Mrs. Maisel including Outstanding Music Supervision and Outstanding Comedy Series, two PGA Awards and a WGA Award.

Nominated for a Primetime Emmy Award for Family Guy along with Seth MacFarlane, David Zuckerman, Craig Hoffman, Danny Smith, Billiam Coronel, Matt Weitzman, Mike Barker, Sherry Gunther, Gary Janetti, Pete Michels, Peter Shin, and Dan Povenmire in the Outstanding Animated Program (For One Hour or Less) category for the episode "Road to Rhode Island" in the year 2000.

Palladino has received two DGA Award Nominations in the Outstanding Directorial Achievement in Comedy Series category for the episode "We're Going to the Catskills!" in 2019 and in the same category in 2020 for "Marvelous Radio".

In 2018, he won the PGA Award in the Outstanding Producer of Episodic Television, Comedy category for The Marvelous Mrs. Maisel alongside Amy Sherman-Palladino, Dhana Gilbert, Sheila R. Lawrence, Matthew Shapiro, Sal Carino, Francesca M. Mannix, Frank Covino, Rachel Jablin, Parker Chehak, and Molly Pabin. He received two PGA Award nominations for The Marvelous Mrs. Maisel in 2019 alongside Amy Sherman-Palladino, Dhana Gilbert, and Sheila R. Lawrence, and in 2020 alongside Amy Sherman-Palladino, Dhana Gilbert, Daniel Goldfarb, Kate Fodor, Sono Patel, and Matthew Shapiro.

He won the WGA Award in 2019 in the category Comedy Series for his work on The Marvelous Mrs. Maisel alongside Amy Sherman-Palladino, Kate Fodor, Noah Gardenswartz, Daniel Goldfarb, Jen Kirkman, and Sheila R. Lawrence. He received a nomination in 2020 alongside Amy Sherman-Palladino, Kate Fodor, Noah Gardenswartz, Daniel Goldfarb, Alison Leiby, Sono Patel, and Jordan Temple.

Palladino won a Peabody Award along with Amy Sherman-Palladino in the Entertainment category for first season of The Marvelous Mrs. Maisel in 2017.

== Filmography ==
Year	Title	Credited as				Notes
Year	Title	Writer	Producer	Director	Other	Notes
1986	Benson	No	No	No	Yes	Assistant to the producers
1987	One Big Family	Yes	No	No	No	Wrote 2 episodes
1989–91	Who's the Boss?	Yes	Yes	No	Yes	Co-producer, wrote 10 episodes Also executive script consultant, story editor, and executive story editor
1989	Nearly Departed	Yes	No	No	No	Wrote: "Altared States"
1991	Flesh 'n' Blood	Yes	Yes	No	No	Wrote 2 episodes
1991–93	The Upper Hand	Yes	No	No	No	Wrote 5 episodes
1992	Cheers	Yes	No	No	No	Wrote: "Rich Man, Wood Man"
1992	Davis Rules	Yes	No	No	No	Wrote: "The Girl with Someone Extra"
1993	Good Advice	Yes	Yes	No	No	Co-executive producer, wrote: "Special Session"
1993–94	The Sinbad Show	Yes	Yes	No	No	Supervising producer, wrote: "Shades of Acceptance"
1994	Muddling Through	Yes	Yes	No	No	Supervising producer, wrote: "Let It Be Normal"
1995–97	Roseanne	Yes	Executive	No	No	Wrote 3 episodes, also co-executive producer
1997	Over the Top	No	Executive	No	No	
2000–06	Gilmore Girls	Yes	Executive	Yes	Yes	Wrote 44 episodes and directed six episodes Also executive consultant
2000–13	Family Guy	Yes	Executive	No	No	Wrote 2 episodes, also consulting and co-executive producer
2008	The Return of Jezebel James	Yes	Executive	No	No	Wrote 2 episodes
2010	The Wyoming Story	No	Yes	No	No	TV movie
2012–13	Bunheads	Yes	Yes	Yes	No	Consulting producer, wrote and directed 5 episodes
2016	Gilmore Girls: A Year in the Life	Yes	Executive	Yes	No	Wrote and directed 2 episodes
2017–23	The Marvelous Mrs. Maisel	Yes	Executive	Yes	No	Wrote 20 episodes and directed 14 episodes
2025	Étoile	Yes	Executive	Yes	No	
