= The Return of Jezebel James =

- Promotional poster
- Genre: Sitcom
- Created by: Amy Sherman-Palladino
- Starring: Parker Posey; Lauren Ambrose; Ron McLarty
- Composer: Grant-Lee Phillips
- Country of origin: United States
- Original language: English
- No. of seasons: 1
- No. of episodes: 7 (4 unaired)

Production
- Executive producers: Amy Sherman-Palladino; Daniel Palladino
- Camera setup: Multi-camera
- Running time: 30 minutes
- Production companies: Dorothy Parker Drank Here Productions; Regency Television; Fox Television Studios

Original release
- Network: Fox
- Release: March 14 – March 21, 2008

The Return of Jezebel James is an American sitcom television series, starring Parker Posey as a successful children's book editor who, unable to have children herself, asks her estranged younger sister (Lauren Ambrose) to carry her baby. The series was created by Amy Sherman-Palladino of Gilmore Girls fame, who also directed the pilot, and executive produced the show with her husband, Daniel Palladino. The show was produced by Regency Television and Dorothy Parker Drank Here Productions.

The show premiered on the Fox television network on March 14, 2008, as a mid-season replacement. After airing only three episodes, it was cancelled due to what Fox called unacceptably low ratings.

The remaining four unaired episodes were released on Apple iTunes on May 6, 2008.

== Cast ==
=== Main ===
- Parker Posey as Sarah Tompkins
- Lauren Ambrose as Coco Tompkins
- Michael Arden as Buddy
- Scott Cohen as Marcus Sonti
- Ron McLarty as Ronald Tompkins
- Haysha Deitsch as Al

=== Recurring ===
- Dana Ivey as Molly
- Dianne Wiest as Talia Tompkins
- Savanah Stehlin as Zoe
- Jack Carpenter as Dash
- Jasika Nicole as Dora
- Renée Elise Goldsberry as Paget

=== Guest stars ===
- Wallace Shawn as Garson Leeds
- Amy Hill as Dr. Koe
- Dan Bakkedahl as Darryl

== Episodes ==
No.	Title	Directed by	Written by	Original release date	Prod. code
Fox
1	"Pilot"	Amy Sherman-Palladino	Amy Sherman-Palladino	March 14, 2008	1ARJ01
Bright, optimistic, successful children's book editor Sarah turns to her estranged and free-spirited younger sister, Coco, when she learns she cannot conceive a child herself. Coco decides to give it a try and relocates from a friend's couch to her sister's enormous loft, but gets less than she bargained for when she discovers she is relegated to a dismal unfinished bedroom.
2	"Frankenstein Baby"	Amy Sherman-Palladino	Amy Sherman-Palladino	March 14, 2008	1ARJ02
Coco is surprised once again when Sarah gives her an emergency Hello Kitty cellphone and then her parents arrive for a surprise visit that turns for the worse.
3	"Needles & Schlag"	Gail Mancuso	Amy Sherman-Palladino	March 21, 2008	1ARJ03
Sarah is determined to sign a 15-year-old child prodigy and get the publishing rights to his new book, and she goes to great lengths to impress the eccentric kid. When great seats at a Knicks game do not interest him, she discovers that bed and bath items are what really get him going. Meanwhile, Sarah accompanies Coco to her first visit in a long time to the gynecologist's office and discovers what fears have been gnawing at Coco.
iTunes
4	"Return of the Crazy Jackal Shillelagh Lady"	Daniel Palladino	Amy Sherman-Palladino & Daniel Palladino	May 6, 2008	1ARJ04
When Talia drops in on Coco unexpectedly one too many times at the loft, Coco decides it is time to get out of the house and get a job. She quickly lines up a job walking a neighbor's dog and her plans to build a dog-walking empire quickly fall apart when Sarah reports the neighbor to their co-op board as pets are not allowed in the building. Later that evening, Sarah feels guilty for her actions and takes solace in Marcus's arms and accidentally spends the night at his place, breaking one of their cardinal rules.
5	"I'm with Blank"	Michael Zinberg	Amy Sherman-Palladino	May 6, 2008	1ARJ05
Sarah is planning a party to celebrate the new book of one her most successful authors. However, when the author decides to read the latest draft of his book's sequel at the party, both Sarah and the young listeners discover that their favorite character may not live happily ever after. Meanwhile, an old friend of Coco's comes to town for a quick fling, but upon discovering his stay will be short-lived, Coco realizes she may not be okay with his plans.
6	"Sarah Takes a Bullet"	Jody Margolin Hahn	Amy Sherman-Palladino & Daniel Palladino	May 6, 2008	1ARJ06
Sarah convinces Coco to make the dreaded trip home by promising to defend her against their parents' harsh criticisms. As expected, however, the family gathering soon becomes a Coco-bashing session. Is Sarah willing to taint her parents' perfect image of her to take the attention away from Coco?
7	"Paragraph Two, Section Three"	Michael Zinberg	Amy Sherman-Palladino & Amy B. Harris	May 6, 2008	1ARJ07
Sarah and Coco try to hammer out an agreement through a surrogacy lawyer but each has trouble agreeing to the other's terms.

== U.S. Nielsen ratings ==
Weekly ratings
#	Episode	Air Date	Timeslot	Rating	Share	18-49 (Rating/Share)	Viewers (m)	Rank (Timeslot)	Rank (Overall)
1	"Pilot"	March 14, 2008	8:00 P.M.	2.2	4	1.0/4	3.17	5	86
2	"Frankenstein Baby"	March 14, 2008	8:30 P.M.	2.3	4	1.0/4	3.25	5	85
3	"Needles & Schlag"	March 21, 2008	8:30 P.M.	2.1	4	1.1/4	3.11	5	76

== Production ==
The series came into fruition when Fox gave it a put pilot commitment in July 2006. It entered production and was named The Return of Jezebel James in December 2006 before casting began in January 2007 when Scott Cohen was the first to be cast in the regular role of Marcus Sonti. In February 2007, Parker Posey was cast in the lead role. Casting continued throughout March 2007 with Emmy Award-nominee Lauren Ambrose, Michael Arden, Ron McLarty and Tony Award-nominee Dana Ivey all landing roles in the series.

The series was greenlit and given a 13-episode order on May 11, 2007, but in October 2007, it was cut to seven episodes in anticipation of the pending writers strike.

The show was officially canceled after the third episode aired.
