= The Marvelous Mrs. Maisel =

American period comedy-drama television series

- Genre: Comedy-drama; Period drama
- Created by: Amy Sherman-Palladino
- Starring: Rachel Brosnahan; Alex Borstein; Michael Zegen; Marin Hinkle; Tony Shalhoub; Kevin Pollak; Caroline Aaron; Jane Lynch; Luke Kirby; Reid Scott; Alfie Fuller; Jason Ralph
- Composers: Sam Phillips; Eric Gorfain
- Country of origin: United States
- Original language: English
- No. of seasons: 5
- No. of episodes: 43

Production
- Executive producers: Amy Sherman-Palladino; Daniel Palladino
- Producers: Dhana Gilbert; Matthew Shapiro; Salvatore Carino; Sheila Lawrence
- Production location: New York City
- Cinematography: M. David Mullen; Eric Moynier
- Camera setup: Single-camera
- Running time: 43–76 minutes
- Production companies: Dorothy Parker Drank Here Productions; Picrow; Amazon Studios

Original release
- Network: Amazon Prime Video
- Release: March 17, 2017 – May 26, 2023

The Marvelous Mrs. Maisel is an American period comedy-drama television series created by Amy Sherman-Palladino. It premiered on Amazon Prime Video on March 17, 2017. The series is set in the late 1950s and early 1960s, but the final season contains flashforwards to later decades. Rachel Brosnahan stars as Miriam "Midge" Maisel, a New York housewife who pursues a career in stand-up comedy after her marriage ends. The series co-stars Alex Borstein, Michael Zegen, Marin Hinkle, and Tony Shalhoub. It features Kevin Pollak, Caroline Aaron, Jane Lynch, and Luke Kirby in recurring roles. The pilot episode received critical acclaim and the series was picked up by Amazon Studios. The fifth and final season premiered on April 14, 2023, and concluded on May 26, 2023.

The series has received critical acclaim. It won the Golden Globe Award for Best Television Series – Musical or Comedy in 2017 and the Primetime Emmy Award for Outstanding Comedy Series in 2018, with Sherman-Palladino receiving the awards for Outstanding Directing and Outstanding Writing at the latter ceremony. Brosnahan won the Primetime Emmy Award for Outstanding Lead Actress in a Comedy Series in 2018 and two consecutive Golden Globe Awards for Best Actress – Television Series Musical or Comedy in 2018 and 2019. Borstein won the Primetime Emmy Award for Outstanding Supporting Actress in a Comedy Series twice consecutively, in 2018 and 2019; and Shalhoub and Kirby won Outstanding Supporting Actor in a Comedy Series and Outstanding Guest Actor in a Comedy Series in 2019, respectively.

== Premise ==
=== Season 1 ===
In 1958 New York City, Miriam "Midge" Maisel, a young, affluent Jewish-American housewife, embarks on a stand-up comedy career after husband Joel, an untalented amateur comic, abruptly leaves her following his dismal set at The Gaslight Cafe. Drunk and dejected, Midge returns to the Gaslight in her nightgown, and in a bawdy impromptu set, vents her predicament before being arrested for indecency. Midge meets famed comic Lenny Bruce when he is arrested the same night for using profanity in his act. Gaslight manager Susie Myerson, recognizing Midge's raw talent, coaches her on stand-up comedy.

=== Season 2 ===
As Midge secretly hones her comic skills at the Gaslight Café, she and Susie also hit the road. Touring is hard and female comics are generally disparaged and discriminated against. Midge rejects comedian Sophie Lennon's notion that female comics need a gimmicky persona to compete in a male-dominated field and instead performs as herself, adopting the stage name, "Mrs. Maisel". After Midge disparages Sophie's corny act, Sophie's vindictive manager gets Midge blacklisted from New York clubs. Midge perseveres and gets a huge break as the opening act for famous singer Shy Baldwin's upcoming tour.

=== Season 3 ===
Midge balances career and family life while touring with Shy Baldwin; she retools her act for non-New York audiences. After divorcing, Midge and Joel remain in each other's lives while navigating new relationships. Joel branches out by opening a small nightclub in New York's Chinatown, soon discovering the landlords operate an illegal gambling den downstairs. Tensions arise when Midge initially objects to Susie managing other clients, including Sophie Lennon; is unaware that Susie relies on mob connections for professional assistance. After carelessly alluding to Shy's homosexuality during a set, Midge is fired.

=== Season 4 ===
Following the Shy Baldwin debacle, Midge vows to only do headliner gigs, though with little success. Sophie Lennon gives Midge a professional break before jealously thwarting her career again. Meanwhile, Joel's busy nightclub draws unwanted attention to his landlords' illegal activities. Midge becomes the comic emcee at the Wolford burlesque club, contentedly languishing there until a police raid closes it. Lenny Bruce helps Midge regain her confidence and reboot her career.

=== Season 5 ===
The story covers the 1960s – 2000s. In the early 60s, Midge, still struggling professionally, is hired as a writer for The Gordon Ford Show and competes against male co-workers. Glimpses into the future reveal: Midge fires Susie after learning her mob ties entangled Joel in illegal activities to protect Midge. As Midge's career climbs, Lenny Bruce descends into drug addiction. After seizing an opportunity, Midge becomes a major comedy star but has a messy personal life with multiple marriages, lost loved ones, strained relationships, including her two adult children, and eventual reconciliations. Throughout, Midge and Joel stay close.

== Cast and characters ==
=== Main ===
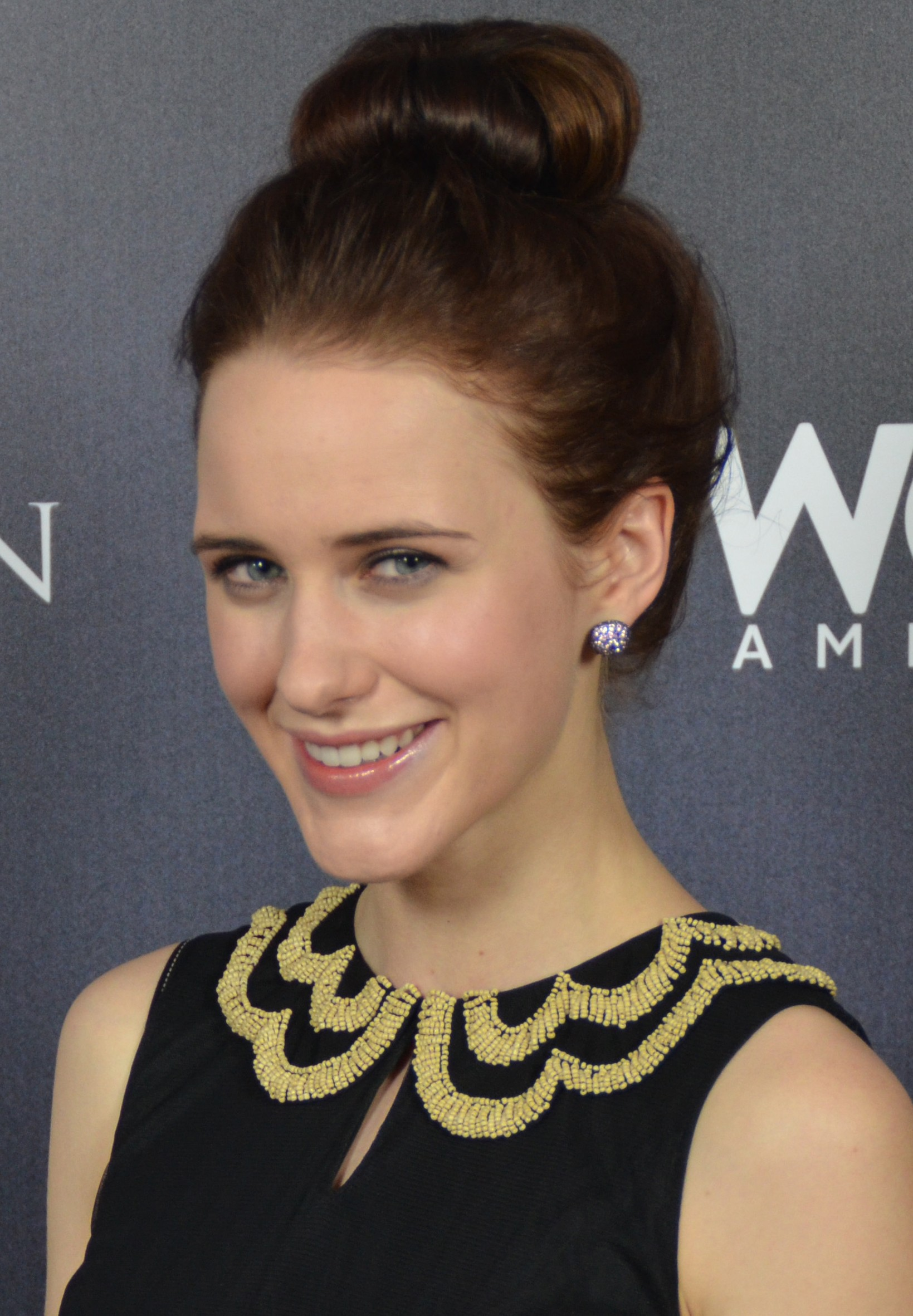
Rachel Brosnahan, who portrays Midge Maisel

- Rachel Brosnahan as Miriam "Midge" Maisel (née Weissman), an upper-middle class Jewish American housewife and mother who discovers her flair for stand-up comedy after husband Joel abruptly leaves her. Fashion-obsessed and hyper-competent, Midge is hired as a make-up counter girl at B. Altman and starts performing stand-up comedy in clubs across New York, eventually becoming a world-famous comedian.
- Alex Borstein as Susie Myerson, who runs the Gaslight Cafe and later becomes Midge's manager after recognizing Midge's natural talent.
- Michael Zegen as Joel Maisel, Midge's estranged, later ex-husband, who leaves Midge for his secretary, Penny Pann. He is an aspiring, though untalented, stand-up comic who copies Bob Newhart's routines. Joel quits his uncle's plastics company, later works at his father's garment factory, then opens his own nightclub. Lenny Palmieri portrays a thirteen-year-old Joel in a guest appearance in the episode "Put That On Your Plate!".
- Marin Hinkle as Rose Weissman (née Lehman), Midge's fashionable and society-conscious mother who later becomes a matchmaker
- Tony Shalhoub as Abraham "Abe" Weissman, Midge's fastidious erudite father, who is a tenured mathematics professor at Columbia University and a researcher at Bell Labs. He leaves academia to return to his social activist roots and later becomes the theater critic for The Village Voice.
- Kevin Pollak as Moishe Maisel (seasons 2–5, recurring season 1), Joel's supportive father and the owner of Maisel & Roth Garment Company
- Caroline Aaron as Shirley Maisel (seasons 3–5, recurring seasons 1–2), Joel's somewhat overbearing but loving mother
- Jane Lynch as Sophie Lennon (season 3, recurring seasons 2 and 4, guest seasons 1 and 5), a successful stand-up comic who uses a fat suit and shtick gimmicks to portray a frumpy, uncouth housewife from Queens in her act. In reality, she is a rich, egotistical, snobbish Manhattan socialite with refined tastes. She professionally clashes with Midge.
- Luke Kirby as Lenny Bruce (season 4, recurring seasons 1–3 and 5), a well-known New York City comedian and Midge's close friend and ally
- Reid Scott as Gordon Ford (season 5, recurring season 4), a popular late-night TV talk show host who later hires Midge as a staff writer for The Gordon Ford Show
- Alfie Fuller as Dinah Rutledge (season 5, recurring season 4), Susie's secretary; she later is the main manager of Susie's talent agency
- Jason Ralph as Mike Carr (season 5, recurring season 4), a talent booker and later a producer on The Gordon Ford Show

=== Recurring ===
Introduced in season 1

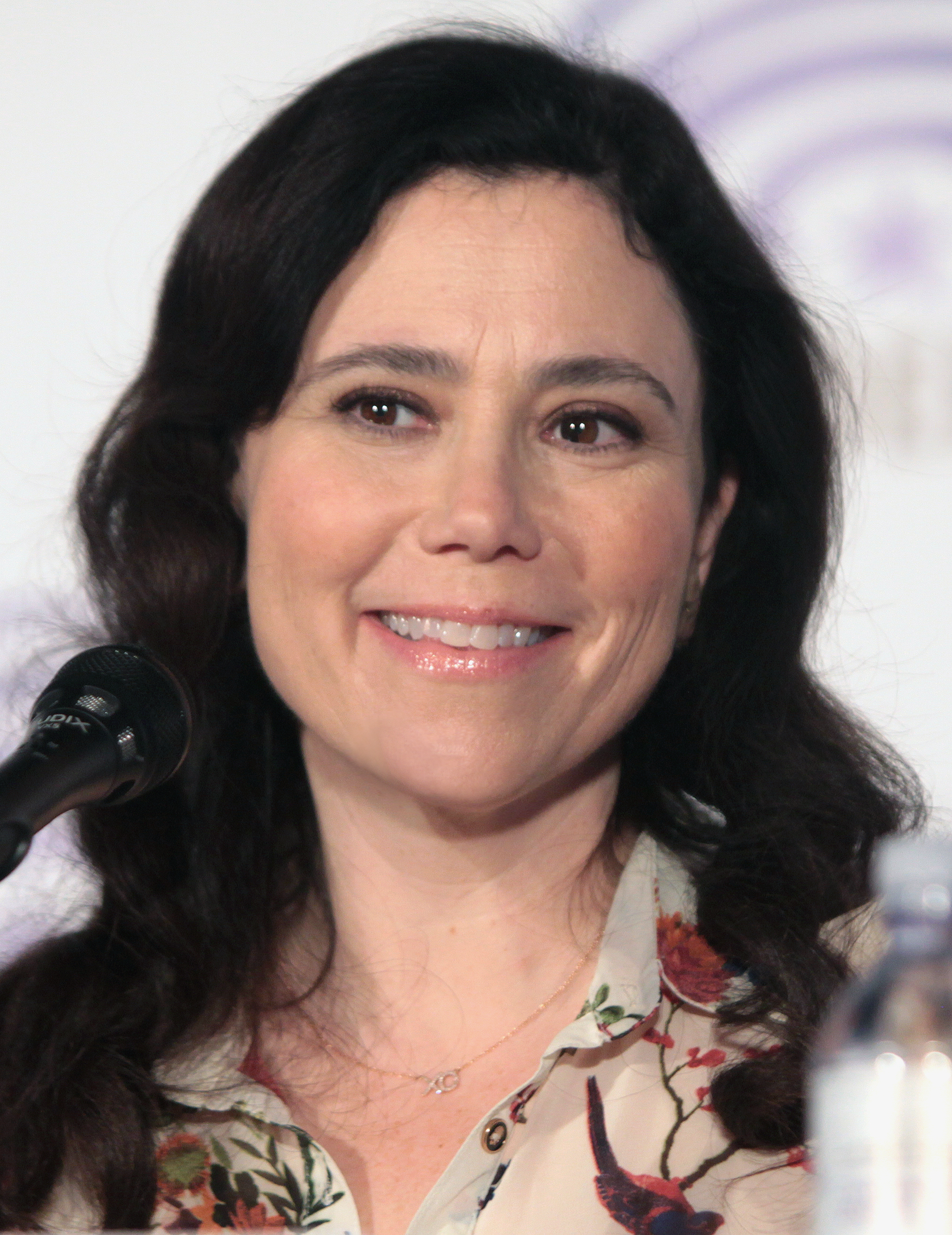
Alex Borstein (Susie Myerson)

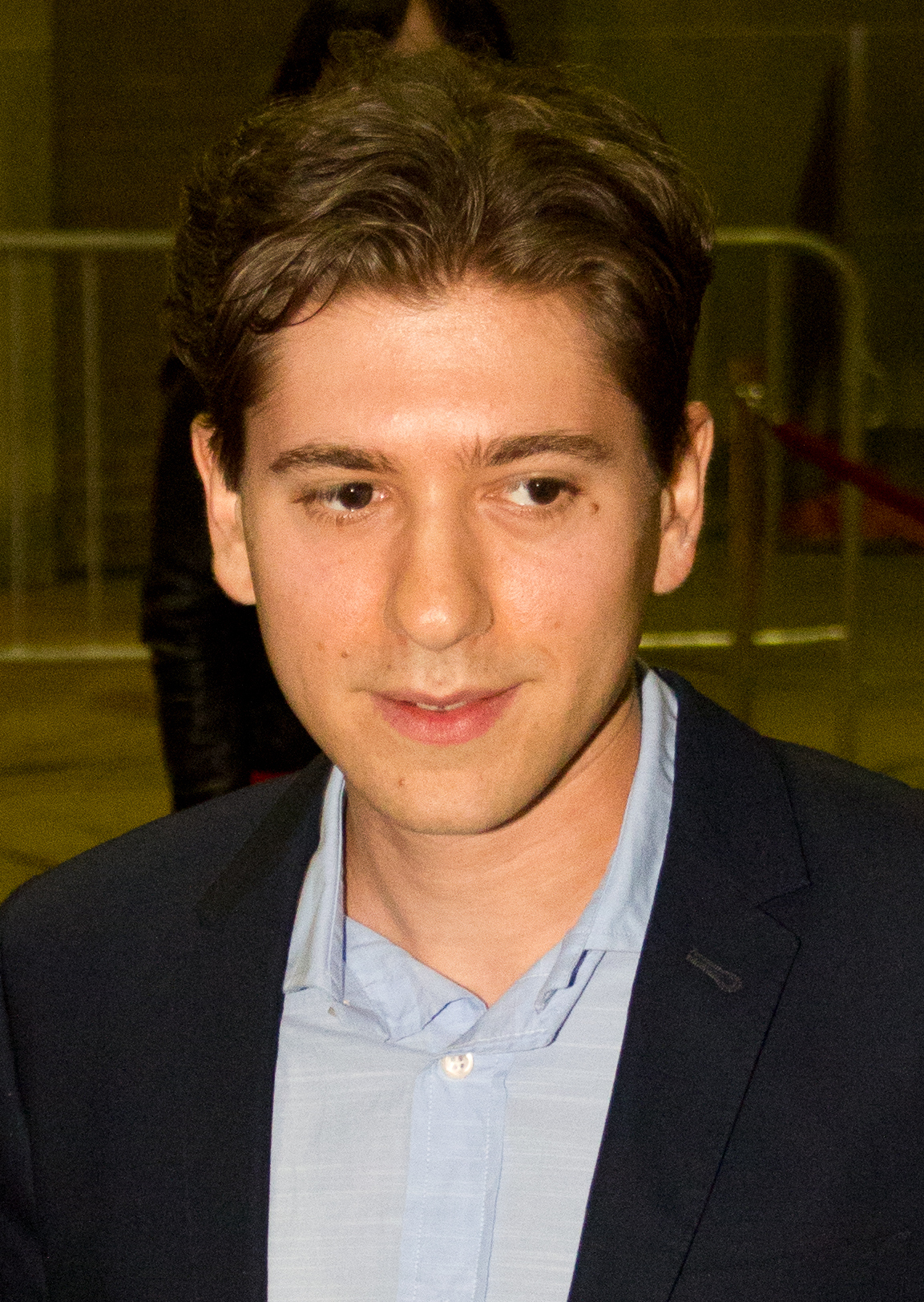
Michael Zegen (Joel Maisel)

The actors who play Midge Maisel's manager and ex-husband
- Joel Johnstone as Archie Cleary, Imogene's husband and Joel's close friend and coworker
- Bailey De Young as Imogene Cleary, Midge's best friend
- Matilda Szydagis as Zelda, the Weissmans' maid
- Nunzio and Matteo Pascal (seasons 1–4), Colin Keane (season 5) as Ethan Maisel, Midge and Joel's elder child.
  - Ben Rosenfield as an older Ethan Maisel (season 5)
- Candace and Kiera Magyar (season 1), Kasey and Morgan Scheuermann (seasons 2–3), Avigayl and Emunah Rosenblatt (season 4), Ireland Jade and Sedona Rose Carvajal (season 5) as Esther Maisel, Midge and Joel's younger child.
  - Alexandra Socha as older Esther Maisel (season 5)
- Brian Tarantina as Jackie, the emcee at the Gaslight. After Tarantina's death, his character dies offscreen of a stroke in season 4.
- Cynthia Darlow as Mrs. Moskowitz, Joel's secretary, former childhood nanny, and Penny Pann's replacement
- Holly Curran as Penny Pann, Joel's former secretary and girlfriend
- Will Brill as Noah Weissman, Midge's brother. He is secretly an analyst for the CIA.
- Joanna Glushak as Mrs. O'Toole, the floor supervisor at B. Altman
- Justine Lupe as Astrid Weissman, Midge's sister-in-law, who converted to Judaism to marry Noah Weissman. Insecure about not being born Jewish, she obsessively observes all religious practices and traditions.
- David Paymer as Harry Drake, a powerful talent agent with clients including Sophie Lennon
- David Aaron Baker as Charles Connelly, Abe's boss at Bell Labs
- Max Casella as Michael Kessler, Midge's lawyer and a former activist acquaintance of Abe's
- Steven Hauck as Dawes, Sophie Lennon's acerbic butler
- Pearls Daily as Maxine

Introduced in season 2

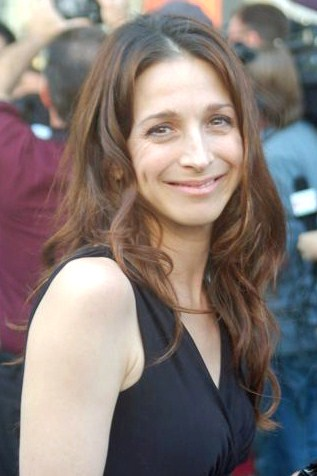
Marin Hinkle (Rose Weissman)

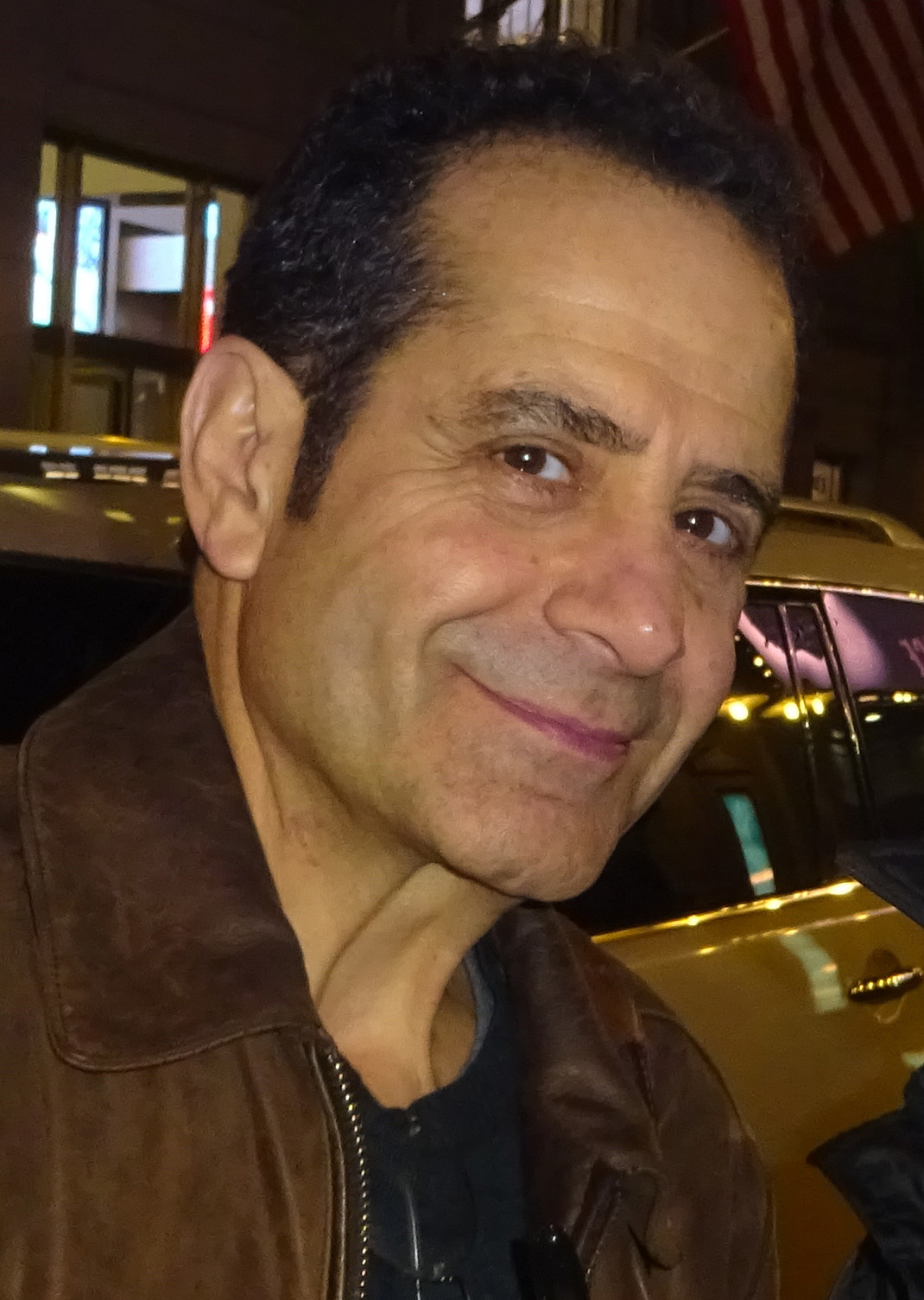
Tony Shalhoub (Abe Weissman)

The actors who play Midge Maisel's parents
- Zachary Levi as Dr. Benjamin Ettenberg, a doctor whom Midge meets in the Catskills and is briefly engaged to after divorcing Joel
- Erik Palladino as Frank, a low-level mob enforcer partnered with Nicky who later develops a friendship with Susie
- John Scurti as Nick, a low-level mob enforcer partnered with Frank who later develops a friendship with Susie
- Leroy McClain as Shy Baldwin, a popular singer who gives Midge her big break as his opening act on tour. The character's singing voice was provided by Darius de Haas.
- Emily Bergl as Tessie Myerson, Susie's sister
- Colby Minifie as Ginger, Midge's B. Altman co-worker who works at the switchboard
- Andrew Polk as Fred, an agent that Susie networks with for booking Midge's gigs
- Connor Ratliff as Chester, who stalks Susie and later becomes her roommate
- Teddy Coluca as Manny, a worker at Maisel & Roth

Introduced in season 3

- Sterling K. Brown as Reggie, Shy Baldwin's manager
- Stephanie Hsu as Mei Lin, a mysterious Chinese-American woman Joel dates and who has connections to an illegal gambling ring underneath Joel's new club
- Liza Weil as Carole Keen, a bass player in Baldwin's orchestra who becomes a friendly mentor to Midge; she is very loosely modeled on bassist Carol Kaye, though Kaye found the character an insulting representation
- Cary Elwes as Gavin Hawk, a renowned actor and Sophie Lennon's co-star in Miss Julie
- Jason Alexander as Asher Friedman, Abe's old friend who is a playwright
- Wanda Sykes as comedian Moms Mabley

Introduced in season 4

- Kayli Carter as Gloria, a burlesque dancer at the Wolford
- Gideon Glick as Alfie Zielenski, a quirky magician who Susie manages
- Santino Fontana as Boise, the stage manager at Wolford's, a Manhattan burlesque club
- Hari Nef as L. Roy Dunham, a newspaper critic reviewing Midge's career
- Kelly Bishop as Benedetta, the leader of a matchmaking consortium based in NYC
- Jackie Hoffman as Gitta, a NYC matchmaker
- Patrice Johnson Chevannes as Miss Em, a NYC matchmaker
- Marceline Hugot as Molly, a NYC matchmaker
- Chris Eigeman as Gabe, editor of The Village Voice
- Milo Ventimiglia as Sylvio, a man Midge meets at Riverside Park
- Julie Klausner as Maggie, a woman who lives next door to Susie and often answers her calls

Introduced in season 5

- Nina Arianda as Hedy Ford, Gordon Ford's wife
- Peter Friedman as George Toledano, producer of The Gordon Ford Show
- Gibson Frazier as Dr. Elie Klein
- Alexander Gemignani as Janusz, Zelda's boyfriend
- Austin Basis as Alvin, head writer at The Gordon Ford Show
- Josh Grisetti as Ralph, a staff writer at The Gordon Ford Show
- Lucas Kavner as Cecil, a staff writer at The Gordon Ford Show
- Eddie Kaye Thomas as Adam Portnoy, a staff writer at The Gordon Ford Show
- Michael Cyril Creighton as Mel, a staff writer at The Gordon Ford Show

== Episodes ==
Season	Episodes		Originally released	
Season	Episodes		First released	Last released
1	8	1	March 17, 2017	
1	8	7	November 29, 2017	
2	10		December 5, 2018	
3	8		December 6, 2019	
4	8		February 17, 2022	March 11, 2022
5	9		April 14, 2023	May 26, 2023

=== Season 1 (2017) ===
No. overall	No. in season	Title	Directed by	Written by	Original release date
1	1	"Pilot"	Amy Sherman-Palladino	Amy Sherman-Palladino	March 17, 2017
In 1958 New York City, Miriam "Midge" Maisel is a young affluent Jewish-American. Joel, Midge's husband of four years, works at his uncle's plastics company while she raises their two children. Midge facilitates her untalented husband's weekly stand-up comedy routine at the Gaslight Cafe, unaware he wants to be a professional comic. After a particularly dismal performance, Joel upends their idyllic life by leaving Midge for his secretary, Penny Pann. Midge drunkenly returns to the Gaslight in her nightgown. In a spontaneous, profanity-laced rant, she unloads her misery, giving a hilarious performance. After baring her breasts, Midge lands in a police car with comedian Lenny Bruce, who was arrested for using obscene language in his act. Gaslight manager Susie Myerson, recognizing Midge's natural talent, bails her out of jail. The next morning, Midge bails out Lenny Bruce.
2	2	"Ya Shivu v Bolshom Dome Na Kholme"	Amy Sherman-Palladino	Amy Sherman-Palladino	November 29, 2017
Midge rebuffs Susie's suggestion to become a professional stand-up comic. Midge and Joel's breakup upsets both families. Midge's parents, Abe and Rose Weissman, blame Midge and want her to fix the marriage. Attempting to calm everyone, Midge invites her parents, in-laws Moishe and Shirley Maisel, and Joel to dinner to discuss the situation. Midge is shocked when Moishe announces that he owns Joel and Midge's apartment and that Joel is nearly broke. Also, Moishe is evicting Midge. A stunned Midge returns to the Gaslight and gives another impromptu performance, this time getting arrested for using obscene language.
3	3	"Because You Left"	Daniel Palladino	Daniel Palladino	November 29, 2017
Lenny Bruce bails Midge out of jail. Midge starts performing at the Gaslight, baffling her parents by their daughter's new single life and late-night hours. In court, Midge clashes with the judge, landing her in jail for contempt until paying a $200 fine and apologizing. Joel gives Midge the money without any questions. Joel's father, Moishe, accepts Abe's offer to buy half of Midge and Joel's apartment, in the event the couple reconciles. Midge joins Lenny Bruce at the Village Vanguard where she does a short set. Susie barges into the Friars Club to discuss Midge with talent agent Harry Drake (David Paymer). When Joel wants to reconcile with Midge, she refuses. Her reason: because he left.
4	4	"The Disappointment of the Dionne Quintuplets"	Amy Sherman-Palladino	Amy Sherman-Palladino	November 29, 2017
Midge moves in with Abe and Rose. Joel's new apartment is only a few blocks from their old one, which he shares with Penny. Midge is furious that he is living a nearly identical life to their previous one. Susie has Midge listen to underground comedy records and they attend different nightclubs to study other comics. Midge wants Susie and her to be friends, but Susie prefers a professional relationship. Midge keeps her budding comedy career secret from her family, but after arriving home particularly late, Abe and Rose are unreasonably angry. When Abe refuses to buy a second TV so Midge's son, Ethan, can watch his programs, she gets a job.
5	5	"Doink"	Amy Sherman-Palladino	Daniel Palladino	November 29, 2017
Midge works at B. Altman's cosmetics counter during the day and performs at the Gaslight at night. After bombing during a set, Midge hires a comedy writer. When she bombs even worse using the corny jokes, Midge wants to quit stand-up. Susie assures her it is only a minor setback. Meanwhile, Moishe and Shirley meet Penny Pann and find her charming but unsuitable for Joel. Midge's close friend, Imogene, refuses to socialize with Joel and Penny after her husband Archie, who is Joel's best friend, plans an evening out with the couple. At a party with work friends, Midge entertains guests with an impromptu comic routine. To act as Midge's agent, Susie installs a telephone in her tiny apartment and types her own business cards.
6	6	"Mrs. X at the Gaslight"	Scott Ellis	Sheila Lawrence	November 29, 2017
Midge regularly entertains (unpaid) at co-workers' parties, performing alongside Randall (Nate Corddry), a comic who introduces her to his William Morris agent. When Abe, a tenured Columbia University math professor, is recruited by Bell Labs, he, Midge, Rose, and Midge's brother, Noah, plus his wife, Astrid (a gentile who converted to Judaism), celebrate at a Chinese restaurant. The occasion turns awkward when Joel and Penny Pann are also dining there. Susie tells Midge to stop entertaining at parties and start seriously pursuing a comedy career. After Susie discovers Midge talked to another agent, Midge apologizes, and they formalize their partnership. Later, Virgil and Oz from the record store are laughing at a tape recording of Midge's first comic performance. They label the tape, "Mrs. X at the Gaslight", intending to sell it.
7	7	"Put That On Your Plate!"	Daniel Palladino	Daniel Palladino	November 29, 2017
Midge hones her act and tries different stage names while Susie works to get her hired as comedian Sophie Lennon's opening act. Rose seeks consolation from her psychic after Midge refuses to reconcile with Joel, who broke up with Penny Pann. After being promoted at work, Joel shows Abe how he will support Midge and the children, though Abe notes little is leftover for Joel. When Midge is invited to Sophie Lennon's home, she discovers that the beloved comedian from Queens is actually a rich and arrogant Yale drama graduate. Onstage, "Sophie" is a gimmicky character in a fat suit. Lennon claims female comics need a fake persona to succeed in comedy and advises Midge to create one. Later at the Gaslight, Midge lampoons expectations imposed on female comedians; she ridicules Sophie Lennon's corny act and exposes her real life. Sophie's agent, Harry Drake, watching Midge perform, is furious.
8	8	"Thank You and Good Night"	Amy Sherman-Palladino	Amy Sherman-Palladino	November 29, 2017
Susie and Midge fear Harry Drake's retribution after Midge lambasts Sophie Lennon in her act. Midge and Joel reconnect at son Ethan's birthday party. They sleep together in her childhood bedroom and consider reconciling. Later, while at Virgil and Oz's record shop, Joel overhears the bootleg tape of Midge's boozy first Gaslight appearance. He storms out upset, then quits his job. After a vindictive Harry Drake gets Midge blacklisted from most New York clubs, Susie persuades Lenny Bruce to perform at the Gaslight to help out Midge. Her opening set is a huge hit, though Joel, secretly watching, is stung by unflattering comments about him and their marriage. Outside, he attacks a heckler while proclaiming that Midge is great. Midge ends the set by calling herself, "Mrs. Maisel".

=== Season 2 (2018) ===
No. overall	No. in season	Title	Directed by	Written by	Original release date
9	1	"Simone"	Amy Sherman-Palladino	Amy Sherman-Palladino	December 5, 2018
Midge is demoted to switchboard operator after Penny Pann makes a scene at B. Altman, blaming Midge for Joel leaving her. When an unhappy Rose moves to Paris, Midge and Abe follow to persuade her to return home, but to no avail. Nicky and Frank, two hoodlums working for Harry Drake, abduct Susie as retaliation for Midge insulting Sophie Lennon in her act. Susie befriends them after learning they are all from the same neighborhood. They release Susie, warning that other thugs may come looking for her. Midge calls Joel from Paris, wanting to reconcile. Though he supports her comedy career, he cannot tolerate being fodder for her stand-up routines and demands she quit comedy. Midge refuses.
10	2	"Mid-way to Mid-town"	Amy Sherman-Palladino	Amy Sherman-Palladino	December 5, 2018
Midge lands a comedy club gig, but finds male comics consider female counterparts inferior. After getting bumped to the last slot, Midge hilariously retaliates during her act. Meanwhile, Rose and Abe acclimate to Parisian life while reconnecting. Abe eventually persuades Rose to return home. Back in New York, Joel, temporarily living with Moishe and Shirley, discovers sloppy business practices at his father's garment factory, though his stubborn parents resist change. Midge rejects Joel's offer to rent an apartment for her and their children so she would no longer have to work.
11	3	"The Punishment Room"	Scott Ellis	Daniel Palladino	December 5, 2018
Midge is temporarily promoted from switchboard operator to coat check girl, though things quickly go awry. Midge helps plan her B. Altman friend Mary's wedding, but at the reception, she impulsively gives a risqué speech that inadvertently reveals it is a shotgun wedding. After Abe pulls strings for Rose to audit art classes at Columbia, she receives a shock on her first day in life-drawing class. Rose lands herself and Abe in the dean's office after she disillusions female students about dismal future prospects with an art degree. Joel follows Shirley's "treasure map", showing where his parents have stashed money over the years. Susie berates Virgil and Oz after discovering they are selling bootleg recordings of Midge's first Gaslight performance at their record store.
12	4	"We're Going to the Catskills!"	Daniel Palladino	Daniel Palladino	December 5, 2018
The Weissmans and Midge depart for their annual two-month vacation at Steiner's Resort in the Catskill Mountains. Joel and the Maisels are also vacationing there. Susie, angry that Midge is interrupting her comedy career for an extended vacation, follows her there. She poses as a staff member while working to book Midge comedy gigs in the area. Joel inadvertently discovers Abe's early-morning exercise routine, embarrassing him and his father-in-law. Midge resists being maneuvered into meeting Benjamin Ettenberg, an eligible New York doctor staying at the resort.
13	5	"Midnight at the Concord"	Amy Sherman-Palladino	Amy Sherman-Palladino	December 5, 2018
Midge rushes back to New York when B. Altman needs a temporary fill-in at the cosmetics counter. She dates Benjamin, despite her earlier resistance. After taking him to see Lenny Bruce perform, she reveals she is also a stand-up comic. She returns to the Catskills for a late-night gig at a hotel. Her set includes risqué material, including her parents' sex life, then discovers mid-act that Abe is in the audience.
14	6	"Let's Face the Music and Dance"	Daniel Palladino	Daniel Palladino	December 5, 2018
Tension increases between Midge and Abe after he discovers her comedy career, though he agrees to keep it secret. To worsen matters, Abe, who had hoped to have his son, Noah, work at Bell Labs, discovers he is working on a secret project for a government agency. Abe is confused when his superiors warn him to cease talking so much about Noah. Joel continues adjusting to renewed bachelorhood. Susie becomes overly immersed in her Steiner-staff persona.
15	7	"Look, She Made a Hat"	Jamie Babbit	Amy Sherman-Palladino	December 5, 2018
Declan Howell, a well-known but eccentric artist, propositions Midge after Benjamin introduces her to New York's art world. During the family's Yom Kippur dinner, on the first anniversary of Midge and Joel's separation, Midge finally reveals she is pursuing a comedy career; she then rushes off for a scheduled performance. Susie wants to book Midge a short comedy tour. Needing funds, Susie asks her dysfunctional family for help.
16	8	"Someday..."	Jamie Babbit	Kate Fodor	December 5, 2018
Midge and Susie hit the road in a vintage Model A Ford that Susie's sister, Tess, "borrowed" from their alcoholic mother. Touring is harder than either Midge or Susie expected and made worse by the discrimination against female comics. Joel forcefully intervenes when a club owner refuses to pay Midge and mockingly locks Susie in a closet. Midge wonders if her growing comic success is worth personal and family sacrifice.
17	9	"Vote for Kennedy, Vote for Kennedy"	Daniel Palladino	Daniel Palladino	December 5, 2018
Midge's first television appearance on a fundraising telethon is marred when she and Susie discover Sophie Lennon is also appearing. Joel, now working for his father, immerses himself into turning Maisel & Roth around. Joel's father offers him $60,000 to leave the company to instead pursue something he really wants in life. Joel considers opening a nightclub. Abe is not as happy at Bell Labs as he originally expected. After a still-vengeful Sophie uses her influence to bump Midge to the telethon's latest time slot, Susie angrily confronts Sophie. Midge perseveres and turns Sophie's "punishment" into a success.
18	10	"All Alone"	Amy Sherman-Palladino	Amy Sherman-Palladino	December 5, 2018
Rose's psychic "sees" Midge in front of a large crowd, which Rose interprets as a wedding. A flashback shows Joel proposing to Midge (without first asking her father's permission). Meanwhile, Benjamin asks Abe's consent to marry Midge, despite her still being married to Joel. Abe requires Ben's personal details before consenting. Abe wants to quit Bell Labs and Columbia University and return to social activism. Impressed by how she fights for Midge, Sophie Lennon wants Susie as her manager. Singing star Shy Baldwin hires Midge as his opening act for a six-month tour. After being pulled offstage for discussing pregnancy, a dejected Midge encounters Lenny Bruce in a bar. Lenny, equally dejected and nearly broke, has multiple arrest warrants for obscene language in his act. Lenny's "All Alone" monologue on The Steve Allen Show incites Midge's own fears. Afterwards, Midge spends the night with Joel.

=== Season 3 (2019) ===
No. overall	No. in season	Title	Directed by	Written by	Original release date
19	1	"Strike Up the Band"	Amy Sherman-Palladino	Amy Sherman-Palladino	December 6, 2019
Midge and Susie arrive at an Army base for their first USO show with Shy Baldwin. Moishe gives Joel a promising lead on a club venue in Chinatown. Susie receives an angry call from Sophie Lennon. Rose tells an astonished Abe that her family's trust fund allowance supplements their lifestyle. Midge ends her engagement with Benjamin. Joel is pleased with his new nightclub location until discovering the Chinese landlords operate an illegal gambling den downstairs. Midge and Susie are required to attend a USO dance, discovering they are only there as dance partners for soldiers. Midge is furious that Susie is Sophie's new manager. Abe supports Lenny Bruce's quest for free speech.
20	2	"It's the Sixties, Man!"	Dan Attias	Daniel Palladino	December 6, 2019
Midge fumes over Susie managing Sophie Lennon until best friend Imogene points how little Susie makes with only one client. Midge arrives home to find Abe with his new leftist friends, who make themselves more than comfortable. Rose travels to Providence, Oklahoma, seeking an increase to her trust fund allowance. After being denied a place on the wealthy family's board of directors because she is a woman, an angry Rose cuts all financial support. Joel's nightclub landlords communicate with him through translator Mei Lin, a young Chinese-American woman. The landlords fail to bribe Joel into vacating. Susie meets Reggie, Shy Baldwin's no-nonsense manager. Midge accepts Susie managing Sophie.
21	3	"Panty Pose"	Daniel Palladino	Daniel Palladino	December 6, 2019
Susie meets with talent agent Harry Drake and his lawyers regarding Sophie. Harry has a binding contract with Sophie, prompting Susie to find a loophole. Abe and Rose bid goodbye to their long-time home after Abe quits Columbia University, which owns the apartment. Shy and his entourage kick off the tour in Las Vegas. Reggie tightly oversees tour operations and protects Shy. Midge is deflated when her New York-oriented set receives a cool reception from the Vegas audience. Susie then pushes Midge to do an impromptu set in the hotel's bar, which is well received. Mei encounters Joel at a Chinese restaurant and joins him. Abe and Rose move in with the Maisels at their new house in Queens.
22	4	"Hands!"	Daniel Palladino	Daniel Palladino	December 6, 2019
Midge retools her act for different types of audiences. Homeless Abe and Rose settle in with Moishe and Shirley, but the Maisels' quirky domestic routines soon annoy them. Susie sees Shy's business manager about Midge's shorted tour paycheck, but is unnerved by his rough business manner. Joel and Archie work on the new club while Abe focuses on becoming a leftist rebel. Shy organizes an activity in the Nevada desert for the women on the tour. Susie works to make Sophie's dream of performing in a serious Broadway play a reality. Joel visits Midge in Vegas. After a drunken night together, the two wake up and discover they remarried. They quickly agree to divorce.
23	5	"It's Comedy or Cabbage"	Amy Sherman-Palladino	Amy Sherman-Palladino	December 6, 2019
Shy's tour performs at the Fontainebleau Hotel in Miami Beach. Rose thinks Shirley has "corrupted" her maid, Zelda, who becomes less subservient. Abe harshly criticizes his rebel group's poorly-produced first leftist newspaper issue, exasperating them. Mei overhears Joel telling Archie about his ongoing difficulty in obtaining a liquor license. Susie returns to New York to support Sophie during her Broadway rehearsals of Strindberg's Miss Julie. Midge encounters newly-single Lenny Bruce, who is temporarily living in a Miami hotel; their romantic evening ends platonically with Lenny praising Midge's act.
24	6	"Kind of Bleau"	Amy Sherman-Palladino	Amy Sherman-Palladino	December 6, 2019
The Weissmans temporarily escape the Maisels to visit Midge in Miami. Midge insists they watch her act, though Rose gets drunk during it. Joel's liquor license predicament is quickly resolved, thanks to Mei, though it stirs an argument. Skeptical investors are impressed with Sophie's acting ability during rehearsals. When the rented theater for Sophie's play cancels on them, Susie's thug friends, Nicky and Frank, use their "influence" to obtain another venue with better terms. Midge helps Shy Baldwin after he suffers a nasty scrape, keeping his homosexuality secret and protecting his career. In Miami, Abe visits his old playwright friend, Asher Friedman, who was blacklisted in the 1950s and now contentedly running a beachside bait shop. Abe later writes an article about the injustice.
25	7	"Marvelous Radio"	Daniel Palladino	Daniel Palladino	December 6, 2019
Temporarily back in New York during a tour break, Midge does radio gigs ranging from amusing to annoying paleoconservative anti-feminist Phyllis Schlafly, with some having odd payments. Abe is thrilled when The New York Times publishes his "Asher Friedman" article. The Weissmans celebrate the bris of Noah and Astrid's baby. Meanwhile, Susie's sports gambling habit worsens. Sophie Lennon's play opens on Broadway, but suffering stage fright mid-performance, she devolves into her corny comic character; amid terrible reviews, the play closes the next day. Susie lambastes Sophie for destroying her opportunity to be recognized as a serious actress.
26	8	"A Jewish Girl Walks Into the Apollo..."	Amy Sherman-Palladino	Amy Sherman-Palladino	December 6, 2019
Joel's club opening is a success until a technical problem arises. Midge saves the night with an impromptu performance. Moishe sells Midge's old apartment to her, using the Shy Baldwin tour contract as collateral. Susie is secretly paying off gambling debts with Midge's earnings. Susie, with her sister, Tess, burn down their deceased mother's house to collect the insurance and repay Midge. Susie later appoints Joel as Midge's financial custodian. Angry readers splatter Abe with tomatoes, pleasing him that his article affected people. Shortly thereafter, The Village Voice offers Abe a job as a theater critic. Anxious about performing at the legendary Apollo Theater, Midge wins over the tough audience with improvised jokes about the effeminate Shy. As the tour plane is about to depart for Europe, Midge and Susie are left stranded on the tarmac after Reggie fires Midge for nearly outing Shy.

=== Season 4 (2022) ===
No. overall	No. in season	Title	Directed by	Written by	Original release date
27	1	"Rumble on the Wonder Wheel"	Amy Sherman-Palladino	Amy Sherman-Palladino	February 17, 2022
After being dropped from Shy Baldwin's tour, Midge vents her anger and humiliation on stage. She is further enraged that her dismissal was pre-planted in the newspapers. Midge presses Susie for her tour money which Susie gambled away. To collect the insurance money and repay Midge, Susie coerces Tess into sleeping with the insurance agent after he becomes suspicious about the house fire. Joel's Chinese landlords are unhappy that his successful club draws unwanted attention to their illegal gambling den; they intend to raise Joel's rent. Susie borrows money from Joel to repay Midge, promising to reimburse him. Midge restarts her comedy career, vowing to only be a headliner and not an opening act.
28	2	"Billy Jones and the Orgy Lamps"	Daniel Palladino	Daniel Palladino	February 17, 2022
Midge moves into her old apartment with Abe and Rose, though they insist Midge say that they bought it. Sophie Lennon, at a mental health facility since her Broadway disaster, refuses to dissolve her and Susie's management contract. Harry Drake advises Susie to have more clients. Shirley tries matching Joel with a widowed pregnant woman. Midge, fed up with less-talented male comics getting the prime performing slots at a club, crashes the stage. After mocking another comic, she gets thrown out, then wrongly arrested for prostitution. Susie bails out Midge and also a stripper who works at Wolford, a Manhattan burlesque club. Midge sees an opportunity at the Wolford. Susie repays Joel with the insurance money and wants him to handle Midge's finances. Abe, happy working at The Village Voice, gives his first meager paycheck to Midge to help pay household expenses.
29	3	"Everything Is Bellmore"	Daniel Palladino	Amy Sherman-Palladino & Daniel Palladino	February 25, 2022
Midge becomes the Wolford's new comic emcee. Susie temporarily stays with Midge when roommate Jackie dies suddenly. Buzz Goldberg, who produced the summer shows at Steiner's Resort, has written a musical opening on Broadway. Abe is assigned to review the show, which is terrible. To deflect his harsh criticism, Abe incorporates himself and relevant social issues into the review. Buzz's friends and supporters are furious over the bad review and disparage Abe during a Bar Mitzvah. When hardly anyone attends Jackie's memorial, Susie crashes another in-progress service and eulogizes him to strangers. Lenny visits Midge at the Wolford and offers helpful advice. Meanwhile, Rose's matchmaking business is growing. Asher Friedman calls Abe regarding his theater review in which he recounted the two young anarchists vandalizing a Federal building in the 1920s. The FBI is now investigating.
30	4	"Interesting People on Christopher Street"	Amy Sherman-Palladino	Daniel Palladino & Amy Sherman-Palladino	February 25, 2022
Midge pressures Boise, the Wolford manager to improve the club's clumsy production. Mei resists meeting Joel's parents. Lawyer Michael Kessler assures Abe and Asher that there is no Federal case against them, but the FBI wants an interview before closing the matter. During dinner at Midge's apartment, Asher and Abe reminisce about their youthful radicalism. Abe is unpleasantly reminded that Asher and Rose briefly dated. Frank and Nicky find Susie a cheap-to-rent business office/living space. Midge, thinking Susie needs companionship, takes her to a lesbian club, angering Susie. FBI Agent Webber assures Abe and Asher there is no case against them. Abe, still seething over Asher dating Rose, implicates Asher in another anarchist incident, possibly opening a new investigation. Abe and Asher's ensuing argument inspires Asher to write a new play. Sophie Lennon asks Susie to revive her ruined career. Meanwhile, Midge has enhanced the Wolford's overall operations.
31	5	"How to Chew Quietly and Influence People"	Scott Ellis	Kate Fodor	March 4, 2022
Mei cancels meeting Joel's parents. At Shy Baldwin's wedding reception, Midge causes minor mayhem, then privately confronts Shy to apologize for nearly outing him. Shy's new management team has fired his old band and replaced Reggie to hide Shy's homosexuality. Midge declines to sign a lucrative non-disclosure agreement regarding Shy. Rose discovers that Midge works at the Wolford and finds numerous newspaper clippings by L. Roy Dunham, a New York Daily News journalist who disparages Midge's career. After secretly watching Midge's act, Rose worries her growing matchmaking business will be negatively affected by her daughter's profession. Susie gets Sophie booked on the nationally televised The Gordon Ford Show; Sophie wins the audience's sympathy. Susie hires Dinah as her secretary. Late one night, while riding home in a taxi, Midge sees something and jumps out.
32	6	"Maisel vs. Lennon: The Cut Contest"	Amy Sherman-Palladino	Daniel Palladino & Amy Sherman-Palladino	March 4, 2022
Lenny Bruce awakens hungover in Midge's apartment after she found him passed out on the pavement. His abrupt departure angers Midge. Sophie sends Susie elaborate gifts to entice her to remain as her manager. Alfie the illusionist is a no-show after Susie books him at Joel's club. Susie negotiates with the Wolford's owners to raise Midge's pay for increasing the club's profits. Abe hires Imogene as a typist for a book he is writing. Four rival matchmakers demand that Rose quit. Mei tells Joel she is pregnant. Hoping for national exposure, Susie tries getting Midge booked on The Gordon Ford Show. Midge wants Daily News journalist L. Roy Dunham to stop her continual printed attacks, but Dunham refuses, claiming Midge is "good copy". To further entice Susie back as her manager, Sophie, now hosting a TV game show, hires Midge as the audience warm-up comic. The audience loves Midge, triggering a vitriolic comic showdown between her and a jealous Sophie. Midge walks off the show.
33	7	"Ethan...Esther...Chaim"	Daniel Palladino	Daniel Palladino	March 11, 2022
Midge meets Sylvio in the park. Their romantic encounter abruptly ends when his wife unexpectedly arrives home. Joel's club revenue is stolen, straining his finances. Rose's matchmaker rivals accost Abe to intimidate her into quitting. Midge performs at a JFK campaign event, but her cheating-husband jokes upset Jackie Kennedy. During illusionist Alfie's performance, he hypnotizes Rose on stage and commands she reenact what Midge does. Rose unknowingly mimics Midge's Wolford monologue, humiliating the family and shocking Midge. Susie intends to fire Dinah until she introduces Susie to a promising new comic. Frank and Nicky warn Midge that Mei's family is dangerous. Lenny Bruce is booked to play Carnegie Hall. Joel tells Moishe about him and Mei. Moishe suddenly keels over and falls off the barstool to the floor unconscious.
34	8	"How Do You Get to Carnegie Hall?"	Amy Sherman-Palladino	Amy Sherman-Palladino	March 11, 2022
After Moishe's heart attack, Abe ponders the man's legacy and writes a premature obituary. Lenny Bruce visits Midge at the Wolford. He apologizes for his earlier behavior and has recommended her to replace him as Tony Bennett's opening act at the Copacabana. When the police raid Wolford's, Midge and Lenny flee, ending up at his hotel room and having sex. Midge discovers Lenny's drug paraphernalia, though he brushes it off. Moishe recovers and is deeply touched by Abe's obituary. Moishe says Mei must become a Jew before Joel tells Shirley about her. With Abe's support, a defiant Rose informs the other matchmakers she will not quit. Lenny's sold-out Carnegie Hall performance is a success, despite a blizzard hitting New York. Lenny rebukes Midge for declining the Tony Bennett gig, telling her to stop fearing failure. Midge then sets her sights on The Gordon Ford Show.

=== Season 5 (2023) ===
No. overall	No. in season	Title	Directed by	Written by	Original release date
35	1	"Go Forward"	Amy Sherman-Palladino	Amy Sherman-Palladino	April 14, 2023
Midge recovers from hypothermia after walking home in a blizzard. She promises Susie at her bedside to no longer reject opening-act gigs. At Thanksgiving dinner, Moishe announces that he and Shirley are divorcing over his refusal to retire. Joel then shares that he and Mei are engaged and expecting a baby. Later, Mei, no longer pregnant, ends their relationship to pursue her medical career, after which Joel creates a drunken scene at his club and the downstairs gambling den, getting himself beaten up. At the airport sending a reluctant Alfie off to his gig in Vegas, Midge runs into a dejected-looking Lenny Bruce, who is moving to Los Angeles. Abe notices recent odd occurrences, which Rose attributes to the Matchmakers. The Wolford burlesque club reopens with Midge returning as the emcee; after a shaky start, she gives a great performance. TV talk show host Gordon Ford hires Midge as a show writer. Flashforward: In 1981 in Cambridge, Massachusetts, Esther Maisel, now a brilliant scientist, discusses her mother-related issues with a therapist. She claims her grandfather was the only person who understood her.
36	2	"It's a Man, Man, Man, Man World"	Daniel Palladino	Daniel Palladino	April 14, 2023
Midge finds the male-dominated environment at The Gordon Ford Show challenging. She runs into Sylvio, the married man she once slept with; he clarifies that he and his wife were separated and living apart at the time and are now divorcing. Abe interviews a woman for The Village Voice but is uncomfortable with her flirting. When a mysterious fire destroys the Tea Room where Rose meets clients, she suspects the other Matchmakers are responsible. Midge continues emceeing nightly at the Wolford. Flashforward: Mike Wallace on 60 Minutes recounts Midge's journey from the Gaslight Café to comedy star, that she is controversial, has had four marriages, and is an Emmy and Grammy winner. Esther Maisel, in an interview, is uncomfortable discussing her mother. Susie is a successful Hollywood manager, though she and Midge are no longer friends. Midge, auctioning her wardrobe for charity, recalls the outfit she wore her first day working at The Gordon Ford Show.
37	3	"Typos and Torsos"	Daisy von Scherler Mayer	Amy Sherman-Palladino & Daniel Palladino	April 14, 2023
One of Midge's jokes is finally used in Gordon Ford's monologue, but she audibly groans when he flubs it on air. Midge's subsequent apology ends in a public argument. Frank and Nicky get involved after Rose seeks Susie's help regarding the Matchmakers. When head Matchmaker Benedetta is arrested for the Tea Room fire, she proposes a truce, saying the other three Matchmakers either died or are hiding. Joel tells his parents about him and Mei; Shirley's grief over losing an unborn grandchild leads her and Moishe to reconcile. Abe is distressed after misspelling Carol Channing's name in an article, requiring a printed correction, causing him to give young Ethan a frightening pep talk. Ford makes an unsuccessful pass at Midge. A photo in Gordon's office shocks Susie. Flashforward: In 1984 Israel, 29-year-old Ethan Maisel works in a kibbutz and is studying to be a Rabbi. Midge arrives by helicopter just to remind Ethan they are attending a benefit in Tel Aviv. As Midge leaves, Chava, Ethan's dour fiancée, bluntly says she dislikes his mother.
38	4	"Susan"	Amy Sherman-Palladino	Amy Sherman-Palladino	April 21, 2023
Frank and Nicky insist that Midge perform in an industrial musical, implying it will alleviate Susie's obligation to them. Midge rebuffs Gordon Ford's romantic advances. Abe and Rose disagree over a new play's meaning until the playwright validates Rose's opinion, briefly offending Abe. Midge's first performance in the waste-management skit is a hit. When Gordon's scheduled guest star suddenly bails, Midge offers to perform but discovers staff are never allowed on the show. Disappointed, Midge goes off script at her second industrial performance, infuriating Frank and Nicky. They sternly warn Susie, clarifying the scope of their prior arrangement, that she, and by extension, Midge, are forever indebted to them. Joel, overhearing the conversation, confronts Susie about her mob ties. Sophie Lennon makes a last-minute surprise appearance on Gordon's show. Gordon's wife, Hedy, sees Susie and pursues her to the street, revealing their college relationship ended badly.
39	5	"The Pirate Queen"	Scott Ellis	Isaac Oliver	April 28, 2023
Joel and Archie inspect a new club site. Midge performs in the evenings to stay fresh, leaving her exhausted at her day job. Gordon Ford is embarrassed that "Diddy Doo" diaper cream is a new show sponsor. During a "Diddy Doo" party cruise, Midge is arrested for supposedly "assaulting" an executive. When producer George Toldedano calls an emergency meeting about it, Gordon dismisses the incident. During Zelda's wedding to Janusz, Midge and the Weissmans are shocked to learn she will no longer be working for them. Susie confronts film producer David Weston at a gay bathhouse after he ignores calls regarding her client, James Howard. Joel argues with Midge about Susie's mob connections, reinforcing their mutual feelings. Gordon attends Midge's nightclub act, after which she again declines to have an affair with him. Flashforward: In 1987, Midge visits Joel, who is incarcerated in a minimum-security prison for unknown reasons, though somehow related to protecting her. His release is in four to six months. She brings a photo of their granddaughter Rose, named after Midge's deceased mother. Joel dislikes Midge's successful wig line, saying it takes time away from her performing.
40	6	"The Testi-Roastial"	Daniel Palladino	Daniel Palladino	May 5, 2023
In 1985, Midge mentions a failed partnership during her act. Jumping to 1990, the New York Friars Club roasts Susie Myerson. The attendees publicly and privately recount her career: Susie's success is attributed to a brash personality and inheriting Harry Drake's prominent clients. She got The Gordon Ford Show producer George Toledano fired and talent booker Mike Carr promoted to get Midge on the show. Joel discovered Susie paid thugs Frank and Nicky from Midge's earnings. To free Midge, Joel made a business deal with the mobsters. Susie did major damage control after Midge canceled her lavish wedding to author Philip Roth. Midge fired Susie upon learning her mob ties led to Joel's imprisonment and that she was overbooking Midge at casinos to pay off gambling debts. As the Roast concludes, Midge makes a surprise pre-recorded appearance, praising Susie.
41	7	"A House Full of Extremely Lame Horses"	Amy Sherman-Palladino	Amy Sherman-Palladino	May 12, 2023
Janusz resents Zelda continually helping out the Weissman/Maisel household. Abe is mortified that grandson Ethan is not academically gifted like other first-born Weissman males and instead excels in "happiness". Comic Danny Stevens guest stars on The Gordon Ford Show. Impressed with Midge, Stevens offers her a lucrative writing job. Gordon counters by grudgingly raising Midge's salary, making it equivalent to the male staff. Newly-promoted producer Mike Carr refuses to allow Midge on the show but gets her added to Jack Paar's private comedy showcase. Despite a great performance, Paar's producer declines to book Midge on Paar's national TV show, claiming he could not promote a funny, pretty girl. Frustrated, Midge breaks down at home. Abe is shocked that young granddaughter Esther appears to be the Weissman "genius" child rather than the older brother, Ethan. Flashforward: In 1973, Midge funds her mother's money-losing "romance emporium", insisting that it continues for the brief time Rose, who is terminally ill, has left; Midge then tells Susie to book the Australian tour.
42	8	"The Princess and the Plea"	Daniel Palladino	Daniel Palladino	May 19, 2023
Abe causes problems at Ethan's school. While waiting to discuss the matter, Joel and Midge separately reflect on their relationship. Abe assesses Esther's intellectual potential. When Midge and her former Bryn Mawr College classmates visit the campus, they retrieve hidden messages they once wrote to their future selves. Midge's reads, "Don't!". Gordon Ford is ecstatic that his wife Hedy's connections get Britain's Princess Margaret on the show. Hedy urges Midge to rightfully take full credit for writing the princess's funny skit. After discovering Susie knows Hedy, Midge insists she ask Hedy to get her on the show. Meanwhile, Abe recognizes Midge's talents and personal strength and regrets supporting her less than Noah during their childhoods. Susie reluctantly asks Hedy to get Midge on the show. Hedy calls in a favor with Gordon, who considers her request. Meanwhile, Midge receives an urgent phone call and rushes out.
43	9	"Four Minutes"	Amy Sherman-Palladino	Amy Sherman-Palladino	May 26, 2023
In 1965 San Francisco, drug-addicted Lenny Bruce can barely perform. The controversial comic, now banned from most clubs, declines Susie's management offer, while Midge avoids seeing him so diminished. In 1961, Midge bails out Susie, who became combative when police found her sleeping on a park bench. Meanwhile, Moishe and Shirley are retiring to Florida. Gordon Ford, coerced into having Midge on the show, turns her appearance into a brief "human interest" piece with his "lady writer". Midge hijacks the segment and gives a sensational stand-up performance. Gordon is initially seething, then invites Midge to the guest couch. He promises viewers "the marvelous Mrs. Maisel" will be on again, then leans over and whispers she is fired. Six months earlier, Bruce tells Midge she will be famous if she claims the spotlight. In 2005, Midge, in her 70s and still performing, lives alone in an apartment in a palatial building in Manhattan. Her and Joel's wedding photo is prominently displayed on a desk. Midge, maintaining a busy career, calls Susie, now retired on the opposite coast. They simultaneously watch Jeopardy! videotapes, joking and reminiscing.

== Production ==
=== Development ===
In developing the series, Amy Sherman-Palladino was inspired by childhood memories of her father, a standup comedian based in New York City, and an admiration for early female comics such as Joan Rivers and Totie Fields.

In June 2016, Amazon gave the production a pilot order, with the pilot episode written and executive produced by Sherman-Palladino. In April 2017, Amazon gave the production a two-season order, to be executive produced by Sherman-Palladino and Daniel Palladino with Dhana Gilbert as a producer. On May 20, 2018, Amazon renewed the series for a third season of eight episodes. One week after season three was released, Amazon renewed the show for a fourth season. On February 17, 2022, Amazon renewed the series for a fifth and final season.

=== Casting ===
On August 5, 2016, Rachel Brosnahan was cast in the pilot's lead role. In September 2016, it was reported that Tony Shalhoub and Michael Zegen had joined the pilot's main cast. On October 6, 2016, Marin Hinkle was cast in one of the pilot's main roles. In May 2017, it was reported that Joel Johnstone, Caroline Aaron, Kevin Pollak, and Bailey De Young were set to appear in recurring roles.

On May 23, 2018, Zachary Levi was announced to appear in the second season in a recurring capacity. On August 15, 2018, it was reported that Jane Lynch would reprise her role of Sophie Lennon in recurring capacity in season two.

On April 15, 2019, it was announced that Sterling K. Brown would appear in the third season in an undisclosed role. The October 14, 2019, release of the season's teaser trailer revealed that Liza Weil would also play an undisclosed character.

On June 21, 2021, Kayli Carter was announced to appear in the fourth season in a recurring capacity. Other season 4 guest stars include Milo Ventimiglia and Kelly Bishop, who both appeared on Gilmore Girls, which was created by Amy Sherman-Palladino. Additional season 4 guest stars include Jason Ralph (who is Rachel Brosnahan's real-life husband) and filmmaker John Waters. For the fifth season, Reid Scott, Alfie Fuller, and Jason Ralph were promoted to series regulars after having recurring roles in the fourth season.

=== Filming ===
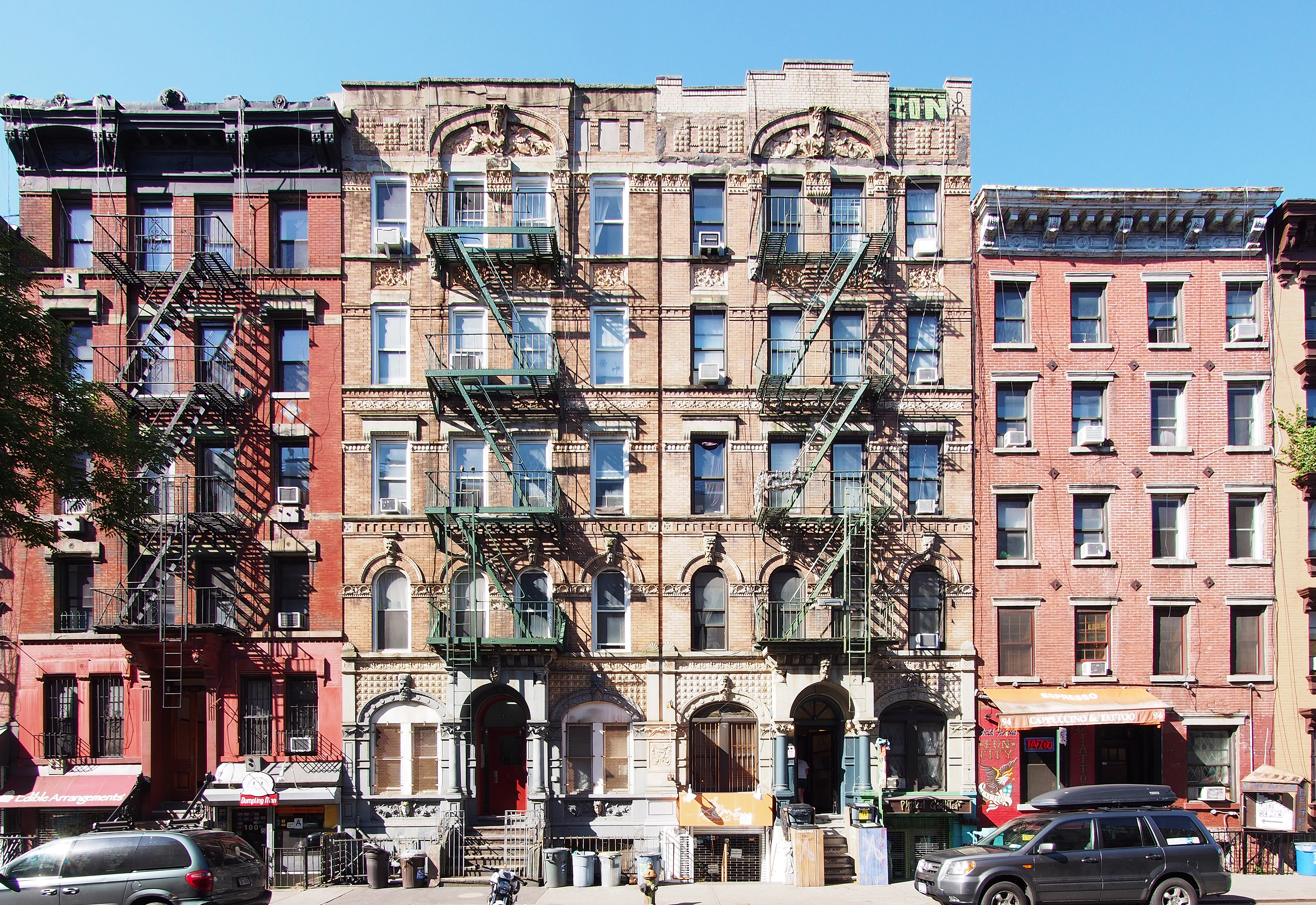
The Gaslight Club location at 96 St. Mark's Place, Manhattan

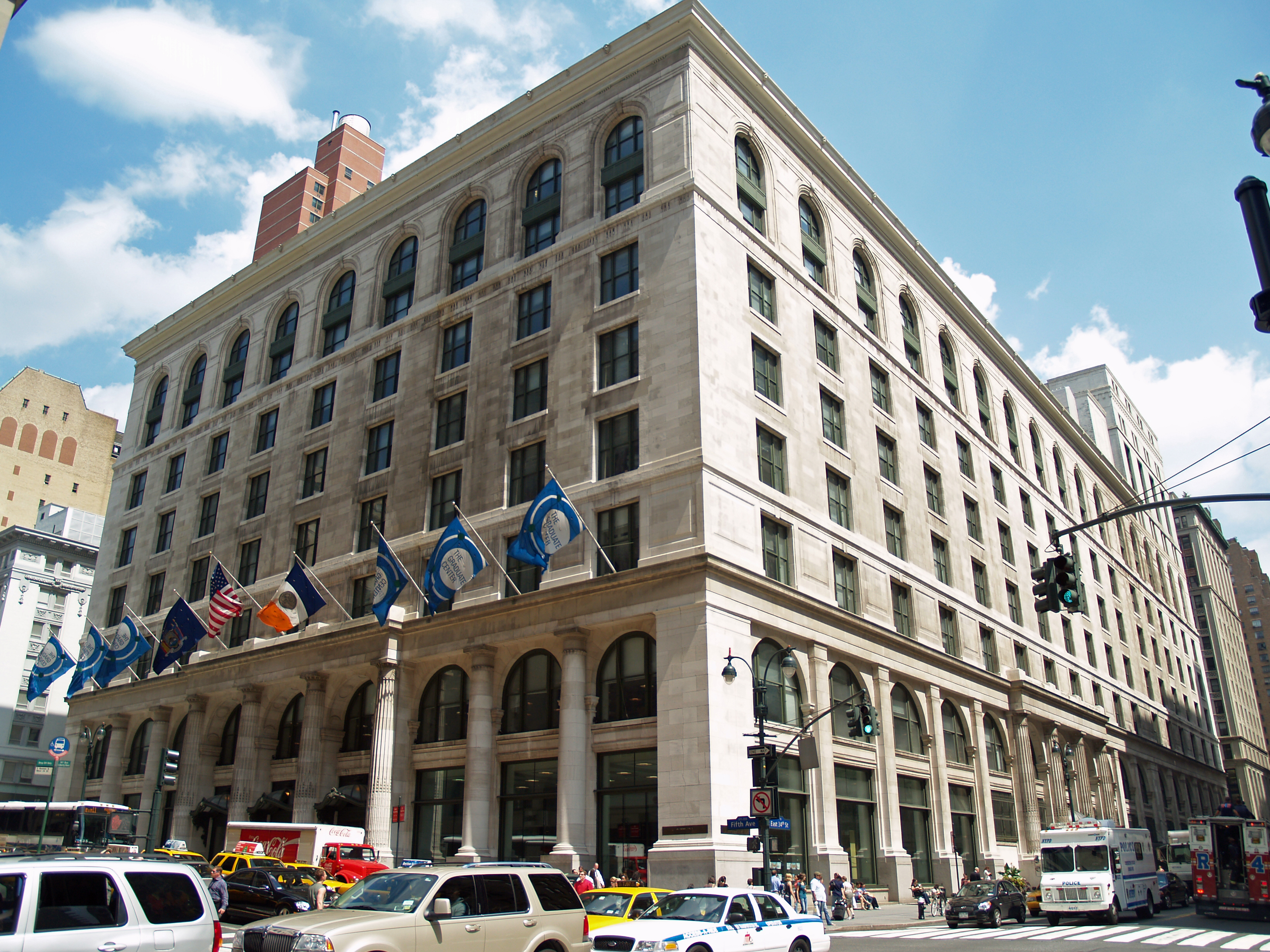
The former B. Altman and Company Building on Fifth Avenue

Principal photography for the pilot took place from September 27 to October 14, 2016, in Manhattan. Filming for the fourth season began on January 20, 2021 and wrapped in early July 2021. Filming for the fifth season began in late February 2022 in New York City.

==== Locations ====
Exterior shots for the Gaslight Club were filmed in October 2016 outside 96 St. Mark's Place in the East Village, the building featured on the cover of Led Zeppelin's 1975 album Physical Graffiti.

Other New York locations included The Village Vanguard jazz club on Seventh Avenue South, a vintage record store on West 4th Street, and Albanese Meats & Poultry, a butcher shop on Elizabeth Street in Little Italy. Exterior scenes set at the B. Altman department store were filmed at the B. Altman and Company Building at Fifth Avenue, while interiors were shot in a disused bank in Brooklyn. The interior of Moishe Maisel's garment factory was filmed at Martin Greenfield Clothier in Bushwick, Brooklyn, although in the show it was set in Manhattan's Garment District.

Season 2's scenes set at the holiday resort in the Catskills were filmed on location at a holiday resort on the Oquaga Lake near Deposit. Paris scenes were filmed at various real-life locations in the 2nd arrondissement of Paris, and at the Musée Rodin at Hôtel Biron. One of the hotels in season 3 was the Fontainebleau Miami Beach.

==== Oners ====
The show makes frequent use of "oners", extended single-shot scenes. "Going to the Catskills" offers a two-minute oner depicting Midge and her family getting rambunctiously resettled in their summer home in the Catskills. It included a half-dozen overlapping vignettes. In "Strike Up the Band", in a 12-page scene, Midge comes into their apartment to find her parents fighting, with her clothes scattered everywhere. In another, Midge and Susie ride in an open Jeep to an airplane hangar where Midge will later open for Shy. The camera follows them from the Jeep into the hangar, where soldiers manhandle her onto the stage, which she crosses while waving to the nearly 1,000 soldiers facing her before she is lifted back into the Jeep.

=== Design ===
The "apartment" where Midge and her husband Joel live was created on the same set as the apartment where Midge's parents live, but with more modern (late-1950s) design, inspired in part by Doris Day movies, according to production designer Bill Groom. The "retro" typeface used for the show's logo is Sparkly by Stuart Sandler of Font Diner. The show's distinctive designs and costumes—most notably the women's hats and dresses—led the Paley Center for Media to create an exhibit called "Making Maisel Marvelous" in 2019.

The design of a Cuban dance number in episode 5 of season 3 was inspired by the 1964 film I Am Cuba, which is a favorite film of series cinematographer M. David Mullen.

In December 2019, two costumes from the series were acquired by the National Museum of American History at the Smithsonian Institution.

== Release ==
=== Marketing ===
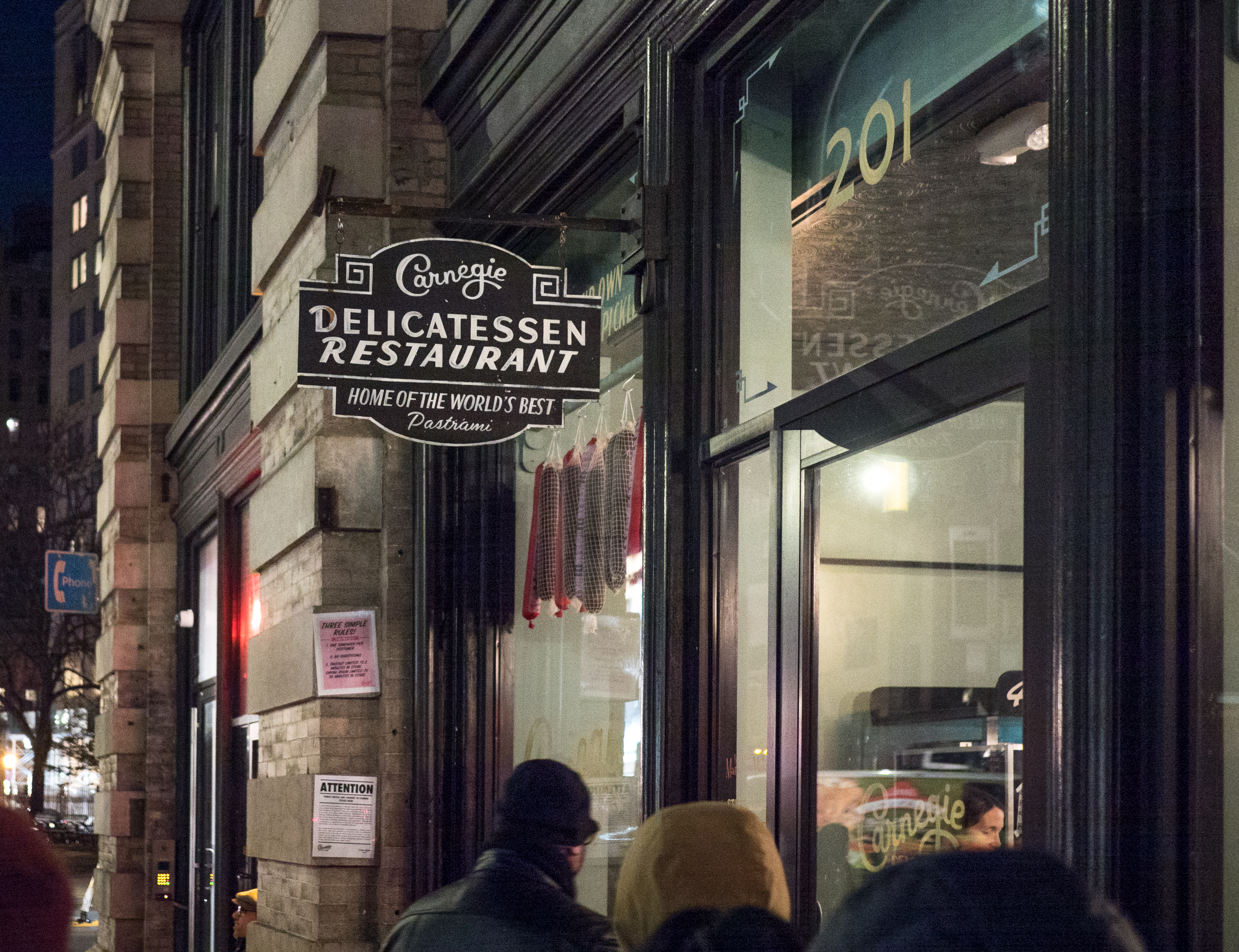
The pop-up restaurant modeled after Carnegie Deli

On October 10, 2017, the official trailer for the first season was released. On August 9, 2018, a teaser trailer for the second season was released. On October 24, 2018, the official trailer for season two was released. From December 1–8, 2018, Amazon opened up a pop-up restaurant in Manhattan's Nolita neighborhood modeled after Carnegie Deli as it appeared during the 1950s. The restaurant served a menu much more limited than what was actually offered at the original deli with the only two sandwich options being "The Maisel" and "The Susie". Other items offered included mini knishes, black and white cookies, cheesecake, and pickles. As the restaurant was purely for promotional purposes, nothing on the menu cost more than 99 cents, and all the proceeds went to support the Lower Eastside Girls Club.

In August 2019, to promote the show for the upcoming 71st Primetime Emmy Awards, Amazon partnered with various businesses in and around Santa Monica, California, to provide goods and services at 1959 prices. The offer to sell gasoline at $0.30 per gallon led to long queues and traffic jams in front of the gas station that offered the promotion, forcing police to intervene.

=== Premiere ===
The series held its official premiere on November 13, 2017, at the Village East Cinema in New York City. It premiered as a part of Amazon's Spring 2017 pilot season on March 17, 2017. The remainder of the first season was released on November 29, 2017. The second season premiered on December 5, 2018, and the third season premiered December 6, 2019.

Season 4's release format changed from the all-at-once binge of previous seasons to weekly releases of two episodes each; the season premiered on February 18, 2022. The fifth and final season, which consists of 9 episodes, premiered on April 14, 2023.

== Reception ==
Critical response of The Marvelous Mrs. Maisel
Season	Rotten Tomatoes	Metacritic
1	94% (83 reviews)	80 (27 reviews)
2	92% (72 reviews)	85 (24 reviews)
3	79% (53 reviews)	75 (19 reviews)
4	92% (66 reviews)	65 (17 reviews)
5	96% (48 reviews)	80 (15 reviews)

The series has received broad critical acclaim. On Rotten Tomatoes, it received an overall score of 90% and an overall score of 78 on Metacritic.

=== Season 1 ===
On review aggregator Rotten Tomatoes, the first season holds a 94% approval rating, with an average rating of 7.6 out of 10 based on 83 reviews. The website's critical consensus reads, "The Marvelous Mrs. Maisel is an upbeat addition to Amazon's original offerings, propelled by a playful yet poignant performance by Rachel Brosnahan." On Metacritic, the series has an average weighted score of 80 out of 100, based on 27 critics, indicating "generally favorable reviews".

The pilot episode of The Marvelous Mrs. Maisel was one of Amazon Video's most successful ever, achieving an average viewer rating of 4.9 (out of 5). The review of the pilot in The Guardian praised the combination of Sherman-Palladino's "banging dialogue and the utterly winning charm of Brosnahan", while The A.V. Club praised the "outstanding" production design and said "this is a series that's as confident as its heroine—and what a heroine she is." A critic for Slate called the episode "a knockout", stating that the stand-up element "introduces a welcome streak of discipline, both verbal and thematic, into Sherman-Palladino's charming but manic work."

The Jerusalem Post highlighted the exceptionally well done "Jewishness" of the work, calling it a "comedic delight of a show, combining Sherman-Palladino's knack for witty dialogue with the colorful, rich world of 1950s New York and the intensity of family drama and changing times." NPR similarly highlighted the effectiveness of the comedy in the show, calling it "a heroic fantasy."

=== Season 2 ===
On Rotten Tomatoes, the second season holds a 92% approval rating, with an average rating of 8.2 out of 10 based on 72 reviews. The website's critical consensus reads, "Like Midge herself, The Marvelous Mrs. Maisel charges full speed ahead in a second season brimming with warmth, empowerment, and a whole lot of laughs." Metacritic assigned the season a score of 85 out of 100 based on 24 critics, indicating "universal acclaim". Karen Lehrman Bloch called it "a timeless, transcendent work of art".

=== Season 3 ===
On Rotten Tomatoes, the third season holds a 79% approval rating, with an average rating of 7.7 out of 10 based on 53 reviews. The website's critical consensus reads, "As visually spectacular as ever, The Marvelous Mrs. Maisel's banter and pace still fly with comedic fury – but shallow social commentary and wandering storylines highlight the show's increasingly superficial tendencies." Metacritic assigned the season a score of 75 out of 100 based on 19 critics, indicating "generally favorable reviews". Alan Sepinwall of Rolling Stone wrote that it offered "a lot of energy and fancy footwork that often makes no sense".

=== Season 4 ===
On Rotten Tomatoes, the fourth season holds a 92% approval rating, with an average rating of 7.7 out of 10 based on 66 reviews. The website's critical consensus reads, "The Marvelous Mrs. Maisel has seemingly run out of fresh material, but it continues to reward fans with expert delivery and snappy presentation." Metacritic assigned the season a score of 65 out of 100 based on 17 critics, indicating "generally favorable reviews".

=== Season 5 ===
On Rotten Tomatoes, the fifth season holds a 96% approval rating, with an average rating of 7.85 out of 10 based on 48 reviews. The website's critical consensus reads, "All good comedy sets must arrive at a final punchline, and The Marvelous Mrs. Maisel reliably nails its own with a fifth season that wisely puts Rachel Brosnahan and Alex Borstein's repartee front and center. Metacritic assigned the season a score of 80 out of 100 based on 15 critics, indicating "generally favorable reviews".

== Awards and nominations ==
Year	Award	Category	Nominee(s)	Result	Ref.
2018	Golden Globe Awards	Best Television Series – Musical or Comedy	The Marvelous Mrs. Maisel	Won	
2018	Golden Globe Awards	Best Actress – Television Series Musical or Comedy	Rachel Brosnahan	Won	
2018	Critics' Choice Television Awards	Best Comedy Series	The Marvelous Mrs. Maisel	Won	
2018	Critics' Choice Television Awards	Best Actress in a Comedy Series	Rachel Brosnahan	Won	
2018	Critics' Choice Television Awards	Best Supporting Actress in a Comedy Series	Alex Borstein	Nominated	
2018	Producers Guild of America Awards	Outstanding Producer of Episodic Television – Comedy	Amy Sherman‐Palladino, Daniel Palladino, Dhana Rivera Gilbert & Sheila Lawrence	Won	
2018	Directors Guild of America Awards	Outstanding Directorial Achievement for a Comedy Series	Amy Sherman-Palladino (for "Pilot")	Nominated	
2018	Costume Designers Guild Awards	Excellence in Period Television	Donna Zakowska	Nominated	
2018	Location Managers Guild Awards	Outstanding Locations in Period Television	Amanda Foley-Burbank & Jose Guerrero	Nominated	
2018	Peabody Awards	Entertainment, children's and youth honoree	The Marvelous Mrs. Maisel	Won	
2018	Television Critics Association Awards	Outstanding Achievement in Comedy	The Marvelous Mrs. Maisel	Nominated	
2018	Television Critics Association Awards	Outstanding New Program	The Marvelous Mrs. Maisel	Nominated	
2018	Television Critics Association Awards	Individual Achievement in Comedy	Rachel Brosnahan	Won	
2018	Primetime Emmy Awards	Outstanding Comedy Series	The Marvelous Mrs. Maisel	Won	
2018	Primetime Emmy Awards	Outstanding Lead Actress in a Comedy Series	Rachel Brosnahan	Won	
2018	Primetime Emmy Awards	Outstanding Supporting Actor in a Comedy Series	Tony Shalhoub	Nominated	
2018	Primetime Emmy Awards	Outstanding Supporting Actress in a Comedy Series	Alex Borstein	Won	
2018	Primetime Emmy Awards	Outstanding Directing for a Comedy Series	Amy Sherman-Palladino (for "Pilot")	Won	
2018	Primetime Emmy Awards	Outstanding Writing for a Comedy Series	Amy Sherman-Palladino (for "Pilot")	Won	
2018	Primetime Creative Arts Emmy Awards	Outstanding Guest Actress in a Comedy Series	Jane Lynch (for "Put That on Your Plate!")	Nominated	
2018	Primetime Creative Arts Emmy Awards	Outstanding Casting for a Comedy Series	Meredith Tucker, Jeanie Bacharach & Cindy Tolan	Won	
2018	Primetime Creative Arts Emmy Awards	Outstanding Cinematography for a Single Camera Series	M. David Mullen (for "Pilot")	Nominated	
2018	Primetime Creative Arts Emmy Awards	Outstanding Hairstyling for a Single Camera Series	Francesca Paris, Christine Cantrell, Cassie Hurd & Reo Anderson (for "Pilot")	Nominated	
2018	Primetime Creative Arts Emmy Awards	Outstanding Music Supervision	Robin Urdang, Amy Sherman-Palladino & Daniel Palladino (for "Pilot")	Won	
2018	Primetime Creative Arts Emmy Awards	Outstanding Period Costumes	Donna Zakowska, Marina Rei, Ginnie Patton & Sheila Grover (for "The Disappointment of the Dionne Quintuplets")	Nominated	
2018	Primetime Creative Arts Emmy Awards	Outstanding Production Design for a Narrative Period or Fantasy Program (One Hour or More)	Bill Groom, Neil Prince & Ellen Christiansen (for "Ya Shivu v Bolshom Dome Na Kholme")	Nominated	
2018	Primetime Creative Arts Emmy Awards	Outstanding Single-Camera Picture Editing for a Comedy Series	Brian A. Kates (for "Pilot")	Won	
2018	People's Choice Awards	The Bingeworthy Show of 2018	The Marvelous Mrs. Maisel	Shortlisted	
2018	American Film Institute Awards	Top 10 TV Programs of the Year	The Marvelous Mrs. Maisel	Won	
2019	Golden Globe Awards	Best Television Series – Musical or Comedy	The Marvelous Mrs. Maisel	Nominated	
2019	Golden Globe Awards	Best Actress – Television Series Musical or Comedy	Rachel Brosnahan	Won	
2019	Golden Globe Awards	Best Supporting Actress – Series, Miniseries or Television Film	Alex Borstein	Nominated	
2019	Dorian Awards	TV Comedy of the Year	The Marvelous Mrs. Maisel	Nominated	
2019	Dorian Awards	TV Performance of the Year – Actress	Rachel Brosnahan	Nominated	
2019	Critics' Choice Television Awards	Best Comedy Series	The Marvelous Mrs. Maisel	Won	
2019	Critics' Choice Television Awards	Best Actress in a Comedy Series	Rachel Brosnahan	Won	
2019	Critics' Choice Television Awards	Best Supporting Actor in a Comedy Series	Tony Shalhoub	Nominated	
2019	Critics' Choice Television Awards	Best Supporting Actress in a Comedy Series	Alex Borstein	Won	
2019	Producers Guild of America Awards	Outstanding Producer of Episodic Television – Comedy	Amy Sherman‐Palladino, Daniel Palladino, Dhana Rivera Gilbert & Sheila Lawrence	Won	
2019	Screen Actors Guild Awards	Outstanding Performance by an Ensemble in a Comedy Series	Caroline Aaron, Alex Borstein, Rachel Brosnahan, Marin Hinkle, Zachary Levi, Kevin Pollak, Tony Shalhoub, Brian Tarantina & Michael Zegen	Won	
2019	Screen Actors Guild Awards	Outstanding Performance by a Male Actor in a Comedy Series	Tony Shalhoub	Won	
2019	Screen Actors Guild Awards	Outstanding Performance by a Female Actor in a Comedy Series	Alex Borstein	Nominated	
2019	Screen Actors Guild Awards	Outstanding Performance by a Female Actor in a Comedy Series	Rachel Brosnahan	Won	
2019	Artios Awards	Outstanding Achievement in Casting – Television Pilot & First Season – Comedy	Jeanie Bacharach, Cindy Tolan, Anne Davison (Associate) & Betsy Fippinger (Associate)	Won	
2019	American Cinema Editors Eddie Awards	Best Edited Comedy Series for Non-Commercial Television	Kate Sanford (for "Simone")	Won	
2019	American Cinema Editors Eddie Awards	Best Edited Comedy Series for Non-Commercial Television	Tim Streeto (for "We're Going to the Catskills!")	Nominated	
2019	Art Directors Guild Awards	Excellence in Production Design for a One-Hour Period or Fantasy Single-Camera Series	Bill Groom (for "Simone" & "We're Going to the Catskills!")	Won	
2019	Directors Guild of America Awards	Outstanding Directorial Achievement in Comedy Series	Daniel Palladino (for "We're Going to the Catskills!")	Nominated	
2019	Directors Guild of America Awards	Outstanding Directorial Achievement in Comedy Series	Amy Sherman-Palladino (for "All Alone")	Nominated	
2019	American Society of Cinematographers Awards	Outstanding Achievement in Cinematography for a Movie, Miniseries, or Pilot for Television	M. David Mullen (for "Pilot")	Nominated	
2019	Cinema Audio Society Awards	Outstanding Achievement in Sound Mixing for a Television Series – One Hour	Mathew Price, Ron Bochar, Michael Miller, David Boulton & Steven Visscher (for "Vote for Kennedy, Vote for Kennedy")	Won	
2019	Make-Up Artists and Hair Stylists Guild Awards	Television Series, Television Mini Series or Television New Media Series – Best Period and/or Character Make-up	Patricia Regan, Claus Lulla & Joseph A. Campayno	Won	
2019	Make-Up Artists and Hair Stylists Guild Awards	Television Series, Television Mini Series or Television New Media Series – Best Period and/or Character Hair Styling	Jerry DeCarlo, Jon Jordan & Peg Schierholz	Won	
2019	Golden Reel Awards	Broadcast Media Longform Music / Musical	Annette Kudrak (for "We're Going to the Catskills")	Won	
2019	Writers Guild of America Awards	Television: Comedy Series	Kate Fodor, Noah Gardenswartz, Jen Kirkman, Sheila Lawrence, Daniel Palladino & Amy Sherman-Palladino	Won	
2019	Costume Designers Guild Awards	Excellence in Period Television	Donna Zakowska	Won	
2019	Television Critics Association Awards	Outstanding Achievement in Comedy	The Marvelous Mrs. Maisel	Nominated	
2019	Primetime Emmy Awards	Outstanding Comedy Series	The Marvelous Mrs. Maisel	Nominated	
2019	Primetime Emmy Awards	Outstanding Lead Actress in a Comedy Series	Rachel Brosnahan	Nominated	
2019	Primetime Emmy Awards	Outstanding Supporting Actor in a Comedy Series	Tony Shalhoub	Won	
2019	Primetime Emmy Awards	Outstanding Supporting Actress in a Comedy Series	Alex Borstein	Won	
2019	Primetime Emmy Awards	Outstanding Supporting Actress in a Comedy Series	Marin Hinkle	Nominated	
2019	Primetime Emmy Awards	Outstanding Directing for a Comedy Series	Amy Sherman-Palladino (for "All Alone")	Nominated	
2019	Primetime Emmy Awards	Outstanding Directing for a Comedy Series	Daniel Palladino (for "We're Going to the Catskills!")	Nominated	
2019	Primetime Creative Arts Emmy Awards	Outstanding Guest Actor in a Comedy Series	Luke Kirby (for "All Alone")	Won	
2019	Primetime Creative Arts Emmy Awards	Outstanding Guest Actor in a Comedy Series	Rufus Sewell (for "Look, She Made a Hat")	Nominated	
2019	Primetime Creative Arts Emmy Awards	Outstanding Guest Actress in a Comedy Series	Jane Lynch (for "Vote for Kennedy, Vote for Kennedy")	Won	
2019	Primetime Creative Arts Emmy Awards	Outstanding Casting for a Comedy Series	Cindy Tolan	Nominated	
2019	Primetime Creative Arts Emmy Awards	Outstanding Cinematography for a Single-Camera Series (One Hour)	M. David Mullen (for "Simone")	Won	
2019	Primetime Creative Arts Emmy Awards	Outstanding Hairstyling for a Single Camera Series	Jerry DeCarlo, Jon Jordan, Peg Schierholz, Christine Cantrell & Sabana Majeed (for "We're Going to the Catskills!")	Won	
2019	Primetime Creative Arts Emmy Awards	Outstanding Make-up for a Single-Camera Series (Non-Prosthetic)	Patricia Regan, Joseph Campayno & Claus Lulla (for "We're Going to the Catskills!")	Nominated	
2019	Primetime Creative Arts Emmy Awards	Outstanding Music Supervision	Robin Urdang, Amy Sherman-Palladino & Daniel Palladino (for "We're Going to the Catskills!")	Won	
2019	Primetime Creative Arts Emmy Awards	Outstanding Period Costumes	Donna Zakowska, Marina Reti & Tim McKelvey (for "We're Going to the Catskills!")	Won	
2019	Primetime Creative Arts Emmy Awards	Outstanding Production Design for a Narrative Period or Fantasy Program (One Hour or More)	Bill Groom, Neil Prince & Ellen Christiansen (for "Simone" & "We're Going to the Catskills!")	Nominated	
2019	Primetime Creative Arts Emmy Awards	Outstanding Single-Camera Picture Editing for a Comedy Series	Kate Sanford (for "Simone")	Nominated	
2019	Primetime Creative Arts Emmy Awards	Outstanding Single-Camera Picture Editing for a Comedy Series	Tim Streeto (for "We're Going to the Catskills!")	Nominated	
2019	Primetime Creative Arts Emmy Awards	Outstanding Sound Mixing for a Comedy or Drama Series (One Hour)	Ron Bochar, Mathew Price, David Bolton & George A. Lara (for "Vote for Kennedy, Vote for Kennedy")	Nominated	
2020	Golden Globe Awards	Best Television Series – Musical or Comedy	The Marvelous Mrs. Maisel	Nominated	
2020	Golden Globe Awards	Best Actress – Television Series Musical or Comedy	Rachel Brosnahan	Nominated	
2020	Critics' Choice Television Awards	Best Comedy Series	The Marvelous Mrs. Maisel	Nominated	
2020	Critics' Choice Television Awards	Best Actress in a Comedy Series	Rachel Brosnahan	Nominated	
2020	Critics' Choice Television Awards	Best Supporting Actress in a Comedy Series	Alex Borstein	Won	
2020	Producers Guild of America Awards	Outstanding Producer of Episodic Television – Comedy	Amy Sherman-Palladino, Daniel Palladino, Dhana Gilbert, Daniel Goldfarb, Kate Fodor, Sono Patel & Matthew Shapiro	Nominated	
2020	Directors Guild of America Awards	Outstanding Directorial Achievement in Comedy Series	Dan Attias (for "It's the Sixties, Man!")	Nominated	
2020	Directors Guild of America Awards	Outstanding Directorial Achievement in Comedy Series	Daniel Palladino (for "Marvelous Radio")	Nominated	
2020	Directors Guild of America Awards	Outstanding Directorial Achievement in Comedy Series	Amy Sherman-Palladino (for "It's Comedy or Cabbage")	Nominated	
2020	Screen Actors Guild Awards	Outstanding Performance by an Ensemble in a Comedy Series	Caroline Aaron, Alex Borstein, Rachel Brosnahan, Marin Hinkle, Stephanie Hsu, Joel Johnstone, Jane Lynch, Leroy McClain, Kevin Pollak, Tony Shalhoub, Matilda Szydagis, Brian Tarantina & Michael Zegen	Won	
2020	Screen Actors Guild Awards	Outstanding Performance by a Male Actor in a Comedy Series	Tony Shalhoub	Won	
2020	Screen Actors Guild Awards	Outstanding Performance by a Female Actor in a Comedy Series	Alex Borstein	Nominated	
2020	Screen Actors Guild Awards	Outstanding Performance by a Female Actor in a Comedy Series	Rachel Brosnahan	Nominated	
2020	American Society of Cinematographers Awards	Outstanding Achievement in Cinematography in Regular Series for Non-Commercial Television	M. David Mullen (for "Simone")	Nominated	
2020	Costume Designers Guild Awards	Excellence in Period Television	Donna Zakowska (for "It's Comedy or Cabbage")	Won	
2020	Casting Society of America	Television Series – Comedy	Cindy Tolan, Juliette Ménager & Anne Davison	Won	
2020	Art Directors Guild Awards	Excellence in Production Design for a One-Hour Period or Fantasy Single-Camera Series	Bill Groom (for "Panty Pose" & "It's Comedy or Cabbage")	Won	
2020	Writers Guild of America Awards	Television: Comedy Series	Kate Fodor, Noah Gardenswartz, Daniel Goldfarb, Alison Leiby, Daniel Palladino, Sono Patel, Amy Sherman-Palladino & Jordan Temple	Nominated	
2020	Writers Guild of America Awards	Television: Episodic Comedy	Amy Sherman-Palladino (for "It's Comedy or Cabbage")	Nominated	
2020	Primetime Emmy Awards	Outstanding Comedy Series	The Marvelous Mrs. Maisel	Nominated	
2020	Primetime Emmy Awards	Outstanding Lead Actress in a Comedy Series	Rachel Brosnahan	Nominated	
2020	Primetime Emmy Awards	Outstanding Supporting Actor in a Comedy Series	Tony Shalhoub	Nominated	
2020	Primetime Emmy Awards	Outstanding Supporting Actor in a Comedy Series	Sterling K. Brown	Nominated	
2020	Primetime Emmy Awards	Outstanding Supporting Actress in a Comedy Series	Alex Borstein	Nominated	
2020	Primetime Emmy Awards	Outstanding Supporting Actress in a Comedy Series	Marin Hinkle	Nominated	
2020	Primetime Emmy Awards	Outstanding Directing for a Comedy Series	Amy Sherman-Palladino (for "It's Comedy or Cabbage")	Nominated	
2020	Primetime Emmy Awards	Outstanding Directing for a Comedy Series	Daniel Palladino (for "Marvelous Radio")	Nominated	
2020	Primetime Creative Arts Emmy Awards	Outstanding Guest Actor in a Comedy Series	Luke Kirby (for "It's Comedy or Cabbage")	Nominated	
2020	Primetime Creative Arts Emmy Awards	Outstanding Guest Actress in a Comedy Series	Wanda Sykes (for "A Jewish Girl Walks Into the Apollo...")	Nominated	
2020	Primetime Creative Arts Emmy Awards	Outstanding Casting for a Comedy Series	Cindy Tolan	Nominated	
2020	Primetime Creative Arts Emmy Awards	Outstanding Cinematography for a Single-Camera Series (One Hour)	M. David Mullen (for "It's Comedy or Cabbage")	Won	
2020	Primetime Creative Arts Emmy Awards	Outstanding Music Supervision	Robin Urdang, Amy Sherman-Palladino & Daniel Palladino (for "It's Comedy or Cabbage")	Won	
2020	Primetime Creative Arts Emmy Awards	Outstanding Original Music and Lyrics	Thomas Mizer & Curtis Moore (for "Strike Up the Band")	Nominated	
2020	Primetime Creative Arts Emmy Awards	Outstanding Period and/or Character Hairstyling	Kimberley Spiteri, Michael S. Ward & Tijen Osman (for "A Jewish Girl Walks Into the Apollo...")	Nominated	
2020	Primetime Creative Arts Emmy Awards	Outstanding Period and/or Character Make-up (Non-Prosthetic)	Patricia Regan, Claus Lulla, Joseph Campayno, Margot Boccia, Michael Laudati, Tomasina Smith, Roberto Baez & Alberto Machuca (for "It's Comedy or Cabbage")	Won	
2020	Primetime Creative Arts Emmy Awards	Outstanding Period Costumes	Donna Zakowska, Marina Reti, Sheila Grover & Ginnie Patton (for "It's Comedy or Cabbage")	Nominated	
2020	Primetime Creative Arts Emmy Awards	Outstanding Production Design for a Narrative Period or Fantasy Program (One Hour or More)	Bill Groom, Neil Prince & Ellen Christiansen (for "It's Comedy or Cabbage" & "A Jewish Girl Walks Into the Apollo...")	Nominated	
2020	Primetime Creative Arts Emmy Awards	Outstanding Single-Camera Picture Editing for a Comedy Series	Kate Sanford & Tim Streeto (for "A Jewish Girl Walks Into the Apollo...")	Nominated	
2020	Primetime Creative Arts Emmy Awards	Outstanding Sound Mixing for a Comedy or Drama Series (One Hour)	Mathew Price, Ron Bochar, George A. Lara & David Bolton (for "A Jewish Girl Walks Into the Apollo...")	Won	
2021	Hollywood Music in Media Awards	Best Original Song in a TV Show/Limited Series	Thomas Mizer & Curtis Moore (for "One Less Angel")	Nominated	
2021	American Society of Cinematographers Awards	Outstanding Achievement in Cinematography in an Episode of a One-Hour Television Series – Non-Commercial	M. David Mullen (for "It's Comedy or Cabbage")	Nominated	
2021	Cinema Audio Society Awards	Outstanding Achievement in Sound Mixing for Television Series – One Hour	Mathew Price, Ron Bochar, Stewart Lerman, David Boulton and George A. Lara (for "A Jewish Girl Walks Into the Apollo...")	Won	
2022	Set Decorators Society of America Awards	Best Achievement in Décor/Design of a One Hour Period Series	Ellen Christiansen and Bill Groom	Won	
2022	Hollywood Critics Association TV Awards	Best Streaming Series, Comedy	The Marvelous Mrs. Maisel	Nominated	
2022	Hollywood Critics Association TV Awards	Best Actress in a Streaming Series, Comedy	Rachel Brosnahan	Nominated	
2022	Hollywood Critics Association TV Awards	Best Supporting Actor in a Streaming Series, Comedy	Tony Shalhoub	Nominated	
2022	Hollywood Critics Association TV Awards	Best Supporting Actress in a Streaming Series, Comedy	Alex Bornstein	Nominated	
2022	Primetime Emmy Awards	Outstanding Comedy Series	The Marvelous Mrs. Maisel	Nominated	
2022	Primetime Emmy Awards	Outstanding Lead Actress in a Comedy Series	Rachel Brosnahan (for "How Do You Get to Carnegie Hall?")	Nominated	
2022	Primetime Emmy Awards	Outstanding Supporting Actor in a Comedy Series	Tony Shalhoub (for "Everything Is Bellmore")	Nominated	
2022	Primetime Emmy Awards	Outstanding Supporting Actress in a Comedy Series	Alex Borstein (for "Everything Is Bellmore")	Nominated	
2022	Primetime Creative Arts Emmy Awards	Outstanding Production Design for a Narrative Period or Fantasy Program (One Hour or More)	Bill Groom, Neil Prince & Ellen Christiansen (for "Maisel vs. Lennon: The Cut Contest" & "How Do You Get to Carnegie Hall?")	Nominated	
2022	Primetime Creative Arts Emmy Awards	Outstanding Cinematography for a Single-Camera Series (One Hour)	M. David Mullen (for "How Do You Get to Carnegie Hall?")	Nominated	
2022	Primetime Creative Arts Emmy Awards	Outstanding Period Costumes	Donna Zakowska, Moria Sine Clinton, Ben Philipp, Ginnie Patton, Dan Hicks & Mikita Thompson (for "Maisel vs. Lennon: The Cut Contest")	Nominated	
2022	Primetime Creative Arts Emmy Awards	Outstanding Period and/or Character Hairstyling	Kimberley Spiteri, Barbara Dally & Daniel Koye (for "How Do You Get to Carnegie Hall?")	Nominated	
2022	Primetime Creative Arts Emmy Awards	Outstanding Period and/or Character Makeup (Non-Prosthetic)	Patricia Regan, Claus Lulla, Margot Boccia, Tomasina Smith, Michael Laudati, Roberto Baez & Alberto Machuca (for "How Do You Get to Carnegie Hall?")	Nominated	
2022	Primetime Creative Arts Emmy Awards	Outstanding Original Music and Lyrics	Thomas Mizer & Curtis Moore (for "How to Chew Quietly and Influence People")	Nominated	
2022	Primetime Creative Arts Emmy Awards	Outstanding Music Supervision	Robin Urdang (for "How Do You Get to Carnegie Hall?")	Nominated	
2022	Artios Awards	Outstanding Achievement in Casting – Television Comedy Series	Cindy Tolan, Anne Davison	Nominated	
2022	Art Directors Guild Awards	Excellence in Production Design for a One-Hour Period Single-Camera Series	Bill Groom (for "Maisel vs. Lennon: The Cut Contest"; "How Do You Get to Carnegie Hall?")	Nominated	
2022	Hollywood Music in Media Awards	Best Original Song – TV Show/Limited Series	Thomas Mizer & Curtis Moore (for "Maybe Monica")	Won	
2022	AACTA International Awards	Best Comedy Series	The Marvelous Mrs. Maisel	Nominated	
2022	American Society of Cinematographers Awards	Outstanding Achievement in Cinematography in an Episode of a One-Hour Television Series – Non-Commercial	M. David Mullen (for "How Do You Get to Carnegie Hall?")	Won	
2022	American Society of Cinematographers Awards	Outstanding Achievement in Cinematography in an Episode of a One-Hour Television Series – Non-Commercial	Alex Nepomniaschy (for "Everything is Bellmore")	Nominated	
2022	Costume Designers Guild Awards	Excellence in Period Television	Donna Zakowska (for "Maisel vs. Lennon: The Cut Contest")	Nominated	
2022	Directors Guild of America Awards	Outstanding Directorial Achievement in a Comedy Series	Amy Sherman Palladino (for "How Do You Get to Carnegie Hall?")	Nominated	
2023	Screen Actors Guild Awards	Outstanding Performance by a Female Actor in a Comedy Series	Rachel Brosnahan	Nominated	
2023	Golden Trailer Awards	Best Comedy for a TV/Streaming Series (Trailer/Teaser/TV Spot)	"Midge" (Mark Wollen & Associates)	Nominated	
2023	Golden Trailer Awards	Best Music for a TV/Streaming Series (Trailer/Teaser/TV Spot)	"Icon" (Project X/AV)	Nominated	
2023	Hollywood Music in Media Awards	Best Original Song — TV Show/Limited Series	Curtis Moore and Thomas Mizer (for "Your Personal Trash Man Can")	Nominated	
2024	Art Directors Guild Awards	Excellence in Production Design for a One-Hour Period Single-Camera Series	Bill Groom (for "Susan")	Nominated	
2024	Astra TV Awards	Best Streaming Series, Comedy	The Marvelous Mrs. Maisel	Won	
2024	Astra TV Awards	Best Actress in a Streaming Series, Comedy	Rachel Brosnahan	Won	
2024	Astra TV Awards	Best Supporting Actor in a Streaming Series, Comedy	Tony Shalhoub	Nominated	
2024	Astra TV Awards	Best Supporting Actress in a Streaming Series, Comedy	Alex Borstein	Nominated	
2024	Astra TV Awards	Best Directing in a Streaming Series, Comedy	Amy Sherman-Palladino (for "Four Minutes")	Nominated	
2024	Astra TV Awards	Best Writing in a Streaming Series, Comedy	Amy Sherman-Palladino and Daniel Palladino (for "Four Minutes")	Nominated	
2024	Astra Creative Arts TV Awards	Best Guest Actor in a Comedy Series	Luke Kirby	Nominated	
2024	Astra Creative Arts TV Awards	Best Guest Actress in a Comedy Series	Jane Lynch	Nominated	
2024	Astra Creative Arts TV Awards	Best Casting in a Comedy Series	The Marvelous Mrs. Maisel	Nominated	
2024	Astra Creative Arts TV Awards	Best Period Costumes	The Marvelous Mrs. Maisel	Nominated	
2024	Astra Creative Arts TV Awards	Best Original Song	"Your Personal Trash Man Can"	Won	
2024	AACTA International Awards	Best Comedy Series	The Marvelous Mrs. Maisel	Nominated	
2024	Cinema Audio Society Awards	Outstanding Achievement in Sound Mixing for Television Series – One Hour	Mathew Price, Ron Bochar, Stewart Lerman, George A. Lara (for "The Testi-Roastial")	Nominated	
2024	Critics' Choice Television Awards	Best Comedy Series	The Marvelous Mrs. Maisel	Nominated	
2024	Critics' Choice Television Awards	Best Actress in a Comedy Series	Rachel Brosnahan	Nominated	
2024	Critics' Choice Television Awards	Best Supporting Actress in a Comedy Series	Alex Bornstein	Nominated	
2024	Golden Globe Awards	Best Actress – Television Series Musical or Comedy	Rachel Brosnahan	Nominated	
2024	Golden Reel Awards	Outstanding Achievement in Sound Editing – Broadcast Long Form Dialogue and ADR	Ron Bochar, Sara Stern, Ruth Hernandez (for "Four Minutes")	Won	
2024	Golden Reel Awards	Outstanding Achievement in Music Editing – Broadcast Long Form	Annette Kudrak (for "Susan")	Nominated	
2024	Make-Up Artists and Hair Stylists Guild Awards	Best Period and/or Character Make-Up in a Television Series, Limited, Miniseries, or Movie for Television	Patricia Regan, Joseph A. Campayno, Claus Lulla, Michael Laudati	Nominated	
2024	Make-Up Artists and Hair Stylists Guild Awards	Best Period and/or Character Hair Styling in a Television Series, Limited, Miniseries, or Movie for Television	Kimberley Spiteri, KeLeen Snowgren	Nominated	
2024	Make-Up Artists and Hair Stylists Guild Awards	Best Special Make-Up Effects in a Television Series, Limited, Miniseries, or Movie for Television	Mike Marino, Richard Redlefsen, Kevin Kirkpatrick	Nominated	
2024	Primetime Creative Arts Emmy Awards	Outstanding Guest Actor in a Comedy Series	Luke Kirby (for "Four Minutes")	Nominated	
2024	Primetime Creative Arts Emmy Awards	Outstanding Production Design for a Narrative Period or Fantasy Program (One Hour or More)	Bill Groom, Neil Prince, and Ellen Christiansen (for "Susan")	Nominated	
2024	Primetime Creative Arts Emmy Awards	Outstanding Choreography for Scripted Programming	Marguerite Derricks (for "Trash Man", "Dream Kitchen")	Nominated	
2024	Primetime Creative Arts Emmy Awards	Outstanding Cinematography for a Series (One Hour)	M. David Mullen (for "Four Minutes")	Won	
2024	Primetime Creative Arts Emmy Awards	Outstanding Period Costumes for a Series	Donna Zakowska, Katie Hartsoe, Ben Philipp, Amanda Seymour, Claire Aquila, Marie Seifts (for "Susan")	Nominated	
2024	Primetime Creative Arts Emmy Awards	Outstanding Period and/or Character Hairstyling	Kimberley Spiteri, Keleen Snowgren, Diana Sikes, Valerie Gladstone, Emily Rosko, Matthew Armentrout (for "A House Full of Extremely Lame Horses")	Nominated	
2024	Primetime Creative Arts Emmy Awards	Outstanding Period and/or Character Makeup (Non-Prosthetic)	Patricia Regan, Claus Lulla, Joseph A. Campayno, Michael Laudati, Tomasina Smith, Roberto Baez (for "Susan")	Won	
2024	Primetime Creative Arts Emmy Awards	Outstanding Original Music and Lyrics	Curtis Moore, Thomas Mizer (for "Your Personal Trash Man Can")	Nominated	
2024	Primetime Creative Arts Emmy Awards	Outstanding Music Supervision	Robin Urdang (for "Four Minutes")	Nominated	
2024	Primetime Creative Arts Emmy Awards	Outstanding Sound Mixing for a Comedy or Drama Series (One Hour)	Ron Bochar, Mathew Price, Stewart Lerman, George A. Lara (for "The Testi-Roastial")	Nominated	
2024	Primetime Emmy Awards	Outstanding Comedy Series	The Marvelous Mrs. Maisel	Nominated	
2024	Primetime Emmy Awards	Outstanding Lead Actress in a Comedy Series	Rachel Brosnahan	Nominated	
2024	Primetime Emmy Awards	Outstanding Supporting Actress in a Comedy Series	Alex Borstein	Nominated	
2024	Primetime Emmy Awards	Outstanding Directing for a Comedy Series	Amy Sherman-Palladino (for "Four Minutes")	Nominated	
2024	Satellite Awards	Best Actress – Television Series Musical or Comedy	Rachel Brosnahan	Nominated	
2024	Screen Actors Guild Awards	Outstanding Performance by a Female Actor in a Comedy Series	Alex Borstein	Nominated	
2024	Screen Actors Guild Awards	Outstanding Performance by a Female Actor in a Comedy Series	Rachel Brosnahan	Nominated	
