= Alison Leiby =

American comedian and writer

- Education: Cornell University
- Occupations: writer; comedian
- Years active: 2015–present
- Known for: Oh God, A Show About Abortion

Alison Leiby is an American comedian and writer. She was a staff writer for Broad City and The Marvelous Mrs. Maisel. Her one-woman show Oh God, A Show About Abortion premiered Off-Broadway in April 2022.

== Life and career ==
Leiby was raised in Annapolis, Maryland. She is Jewish. She graduated from Severna Park High School and studied English at Cornell University She cited Janeane Garofalo, Elaine Benes, and Joan Rivers as early comedic inspirations.

She moved to New York after graduation and interned at The Onion. She then began to perform stand-up comedy.

Leiby was a staff writer for Broad City and season three of The Marvelous Mrs. Maisel. She also wrote for The Opposition with Jordan Klepper, The President Show, and Ilana Glazer's special The Planet Is Burning.

Her autobiographical one-woman comedy show, Oh God, A Show About Abortion recounted her experience having an abortion when she was 35. She began to workshop the show in 2020 as a part of her stand-up, and debuted the production at Cherry Lane Theatre in April 2022. Carrie Battan wrote in a review for the New Yorker, "it’s less structured, and more confessional and diffuse, than traditional comedy. It’s a format that enables Leiby to infuse her show with bouts of sincerity and self-inquiry, and many of her set’s most serious moments are high points." The show had an extended run of 15 performances in August 2022.

She co-hosts the horror film review comedy podcast Ruined with Halle Kiefer.

== Accolades ==
- 2018 – Nominee, Writers Guild of America Award for Comedy/Variety Sketch Series (for The President Show)
- 2020 – Nominee, Writers Guild of America Award for Comedy Series (for The Marvelous Mrs. Maisel)
- 2022 – Vulture, Comedians You Should and Will Know
- 2022 – New York Jewish Week’s 36 to Watch
