= Kate Fodor =

American playwright and television writer

- Occupations: Playwright, writer
- Notable work: Hannah and Martin, 100 Saints You Should Know, RX, Fifty Ways
- Children: 1
- Awards: Guggenheim Fellowship, Joseph Jefferson Citation for New Work, Roger L. Stevens Award (Kennedy Center for New American Plays)

Kate Fodor is an American playwright and television writer.

== Family and education ==
Fodor is the daughter of the cognitive scientist and philosopher Jerry Fodor and the linguist Janet Dean Fodor. Fodor has a daughter named Lucy, born in 2005, to whom she dedicated the published version of her comedy Rx, calling her "the funniest person I know."

Fodor is a graduate of Oberlin College.

== Career ==
=== Playwriting ===
Her debut play, Hannah and Martin, opened Off-Broadway on March 20, 2004 by the Epic Theatre Ensemble. The play, based on the relationship between political theorist Hannah Arendt and philosopher Martin Heidegger, received favorable reviews: Margo Jefferson in The New York Times called the play "thoughtful and ambitious"; in Variety, Marilyn Stasio said, "Strong on craft, Fodor handles the structural logistics like a clever mathematician patiently working her way through a tricky formula." The play won the Roger L. Stevens Award from the Kennedy Center Fund for New American Plays and a Joseph Jefferson Citation for New Work. It was also a finalist for the Susan Smith Blackburn Prize.

Fodor followed this with the play 100 Saints You Should Know, also Off-Broadway, at Playwrights Horizons, in September 2007, about a priest in the midst of his own spiritual crisis interacting with a small galaxy of people experiencing theirs as well. Ben Brantley of The New York Times took issue with what he described as the play's "Platonic" tone that resulted in "a static collection of portraits," but acknowledged, "Ms. Fodor has a fine sense of the forms of emotional aggression, passive and otherwise, that can infuse even the most banal exchanges between parents and children" and "a good ear for the kinks and curls of speech of people of different generations and education." The play was called "one of the year's 10 best" by Entertainment Weekly and TimeOut New York in 2007 and went on to productions in Los Angeles, San Francisco, and St. Louis, among others. The play won the Roger L. Stevens Award from the National Theatre Conference.

Her next play, the romantic comedy Rx, represented a shift in tone, exploring in a satiric way the vagaries of the powers of the pharmaceutical industry; it also debuted Off-Broadway, at Primary Stages, on Jan. 24, 2012. Its reviews were positive, with Charles Isherwood from The New York Times praising its "winning combination of light satire and romance" and deeming the production a "Critic's Pick" Writing in The Village Voice, Michael Feingold called Rx "a sharp, tenderly sardonic new comedy" and "a thornily funny image of today's screwed-up world." Feingold compared the play to the films of Ernst Lubitsch "with their enchanting mixture of sweetness and sting."

Fodor's play "Fifty Ways" was the inaugural commission in the new plays program at Chautauqua Theater Company, the professional theater company of the Chautauqua Institution. The play was produced there in 2012.

Fodor's plays have been published or excerpted in a number of anthologies and are published by Dramatists Play Service.

=== Awards ===
Fodor was a 2013 Guggenheim fellow in playwriting and has been a fellow at the Playwrights Center in Minneapolis, a resident playwright at New Dramatists in New York and a member of the New Play Frontiers program at People's Light & Theater Company in Malvern, Pennsylvania. She has taught playwriting at the University of Pennsylvania.

=== Television ===
As a television writer, Fodor has developed pilots for AMC and Starz. She produced and wrote episodes of the series The_Marvelous_Mrs._Maisel, and produced and wrote one episode of Julia.
