= My X-Girlfriend's Wedding Reception =

- Directed by: Martin Guigui
- Written by: Martin Guigui
- Produced by: Martin Guigui; Bill Henne; Jack Honig; Robin Forest Littlefield; Chris Matonti
- Starring: Debbie Gibson; Dom DeLuise; Mo Gaffney; Kelly Bishop; Bernie Sanders
- Cinematography: Massimo Zeri
- Edited by: John Axelrad; James Gavin Bedford; Marc Grossman
- Music by: Ivan Koutikov; Charlie Midnight
- Release date: 9 January 1999 (USA)
- Running time: 85 minutes
- Country: United States
- Language: English
- Budget: $500,000

My X-Girlfriend's Wedding Reception is a 1999 romantic comedy film directed by Martin Guigui.

== Plot ==
The bride's ex-boyfriend is a member of the band, a collection of musical misfits, at an Italian-Jewish wedding.

== Cast ==
- Debbie Gibson
- Dom DeLuise
- Mo Gaffney
- Kelly Bishop
- Bernie Sanders as Rabbi Manny Schewitz

== Production ==
It was filmed across various locations in Vermont, including Ascutney, Burlington, and Stowe.

The film had a budget of $500,000 and did not achieve commercial success.

== Release ==
It was released on DVD on December 5, 2006. A new Special Edition/Director's Cut will be released in 2022 for the 25th anniversary.

== Legacy ==
The film gained significant attention during the 2016 United States elections because of Democratic candidate Bernie Sanders' appearance, as a Rabbi.
