= Gossip Girl: Acapulco =

- Genre: Teen drama
- Created by: Cecily von Ziegesar (books), Josh Schwartz and Stephanie Savage (original TV series)
- Developed by: Juan Pablo Ybarra; Melissa Palazuelos; Víctor Franco; Genaro Quiroca; Paola Pérez De la Garza
- Starring: Sofía Sisniega; Oka Giner; Diego Amozurrutia; Margarita Muñoz; Jon Ecker; Macarena Achaga; Vadhir Derbez
- Narrated by: Paty Cantú (as Gossip Girl)
- Country of origin: Mexico
- Original language: Spanish
- No. of seasons: 1
- No. of episodes: 25 (list of episodes)

Production
- Executive producers: Juan Pablo Ybarra; Andrés Tovar; Pedro Torres
- Production locations: Acapulco, Guerrero, Mexico
- Running time: 40 minutes
- Production companies: Warner Bros. Television; El Mall

Original release
- Network: Golden Premier; UniMás; Telehit HD; Canal 5
- Release: August 5 – September 6, 2013

Related
- Gossip Girl (2007–2012)

Gossip Girl: Acapulco is a Mexican teen drama television series, based on the American television series Gossip Girl (2007–2012). It was produced by El Mall and Warner Brothers International Television, with Pedro Torres serving as executive producer for the series.

The first and only season, consisting of 25 episodes, debuted on the pay TV channel Golden Premier in Mexico on August 5, 2013. The television show was then broadcast in the United States on UniMás starting September 20, 2013, and on free-to-air channel Canal 5 starting November 11, 2013.

The series starred Sofía Sisniega, Oka Giner, Diego Amozurrutia, Margarita Muñoz, Jon Ecker, Vadhir Derbez, and Macarena Achaga as the principal cast members. It was nominated as best series at the Premios TVyNovelas 2014, but did not win.

== Production ==
The intention of producing a Mexican adaptation of Gossip Girl was made public in August 2012, while the final cast was announced in January 2013 with the streaming of the first promotional video. The producers expected to film at least three seasons of the series. Filming of the first season began on January 21, 2013, in Acapulco, and ended on May 5. On January 14, 2014, it was announced that the series would not be renewed for a second season.

Singer Paty Cantú, the voice of Gossip Girl, also performs the show's promo song, Dicen por ahí.

== Plot ==
Sofía López-Haro returns unexpectedly to Acapulco after leaving mysteriously the year before. Her best friend, Bárbara Fuenmayor, angry that she has always been forced to live in Sofía's shadow, is not happy with her return, especially after discovering that before leaving Acapulco, Sofía had slept with her boyfriend, Nico.

== Cast and characters ==
=== Main ===
- Sofía Sisniega as Sofía López-Haro, the Mexican counterpart to Serena van der Woodsen. Sofía makes an unexpected return to Acapulco after leaving under mysterious circumstances a year prior to the series. Along with the other central characters, she is featured on the blog of the series' anonymous Twitter account, "Gossip Girl".
- Oka Giner as Barbara Fuenmayor, the Mexican counterpart to Blair Waldorf. She is Sofía's best friend and occasional rival, as she has always resented living in Sofía's shadow.
- Diego Amozurrutia as Daniel Parra, the Mexican counterpart to Dan Humphrey. Daniel is an avid surfer and is the son of former rock star Marcelo Parra.
- Margarita Muñoz as Vanessa García, the Mexican counterpart to Vanessa Abrams. She is a hardworking girl, Daniel's ex-girlfriend, and best friends with Jenny.
- Jon Ecker as Nicolás "Nico" de la Vega, the Mexican counterpart to Nate Archibald. Nico is Barbara's longtime boyfriend with a secret history with their childhood friend Sofía, and is the grandson of the former governor of the state of Guerrero.
- Macarena Achaga as Jenny Parra, the Mexican counterpart to Jenny Humphrey. She is Daniel Parra's younger sister and a headache for their parents.
- Vadhir Derbez as Maximiliano "Max" Zaga, the Mexican counterpart to Chuck Bass. Max is the son of hotel mogul Emiliano Zaga and best friends with Nico.

=== Secondary ===
- Eduardo Victoria as Marcelo Parra (counterpart to Rufus Humphrey)
- Isabela Camil as Liliana Lopez-Haro (counterpart to Lily van der Woodsen)
- Alexis Ayala as Emiliano Zaga (counterpart to Bart Bass)
- Esmeralda Pimentel as Francesca Ruíz De Hinojosa (counterpart to Georgina Sparks)
- Alejandro Camargo as Ignacio
- Carina Ricco as Alicia Parra (counterpart to Allison Humphrey)
- Jose Maria Torre as Federico Zaga (counterpart to Jack Bass)
- Eugenia Cauduro as Leonora Fuenmayor (counterpart to Eleanor Waldorf)
- Polo Morín as Eric Lopez-Haro (counterpart to Eric van der Woodsen)
- Lisset as Ana de la Vega (counterpart to Anne van der Bilt Archibald)
- Roberto Palazuelos as Santiago Ochoa de la Vega "El Capitán" (counterpart to Howard Archibald)
- Christina Pastor as Dora (counterpart to Dorota Kishlovsky)
- Aislinn Derbez as Giovanna
- Rogelio Guerra as César de la Vega (counterpart to William van der Bilt)
- Fiona Palomo as Vivi San Román (counterpart to Penelope Shafai)
- Roberto Carlo as Paulo San Román (counterpart to Asher Hornsby)
- Brandon Peniche as Poncho Díaz-Navarro (counterpart to Carter Baizen)
- Norma Lazareno as Cecilia "Ceci" López-Haro (counterpart to Celia "CeCe" Rhodes)
- Ela Velden as Gaby (counterpart to Kati Farkas)
- Aldo Guerra as Mauricio Burgaleta
- Constanza Mirko as Mandy (counterpart to Isabel Coates)
- Regina Pavón as Pamelita (counterpart to Elise Wells)
- Juan Ríos Cantú as Gerardo Fuenmayor (counterpart to Harold Waldorf)
- Diana Golden as Paulina De Ruíz De Hinojosa
- Claudio Báez as Eugenio Ruíz De Hinojosa
- Paula Marcellini as Katia
- Sharis Cid as Lucila (counterpart to Bex Simon)
- José Pablo Minor as Ricky Ruíz De Hinojosa
- Ricardo Kleinbaum as journalist

== Episodes ==
The first season was published in DVD and Blu-ray on December 15, 2013.

== Background ==
Gossip Girl: Acapulco portrays a glamorous Acapulco fully in renaissance, and the program explicitly means to counter the city's violent image. The state government of Guerrero partially paid for the show's production, a practice that is not uncommon in the Mexican television industry.
