= List of Gossip Girl: Acapulco episodes =

DVD cover art

Gossip Girl: Acapulco is a Mexican television series that premiered on August 5, 2013, in Mexico on Golden Premier and ended on September 6, 2013, after 25 episodes. Gossip Girl: Acapulco is the Mexican adaptation of Gossip Girl, and is produced by El Mall and Warner Brothers International Television. Pedro Torres serves as executive producer. The first season summarises the original Gossip Girl seasons 1 and 2, as the producer wanted to have a more dramatic and intense storyline.

On January 14, 2014, it was announced that the series won't be renewed for a second season.

== Series overview ==
Season	Episodes	Originally released	
Season	Episodes	First released	Last released
1	25	August 5, 2013	September 6, 2013

== Episodes ==
No.	Title (Translation)	Directed by	Written by	Original release date
1	"Buenos días Acapulco" "Good Morning Acapulco"	Chava Cartas	Melissa Palazuelos	August 5, 2013
Sofía López-Haro comes back to Acapulco after a year to visit her younger brother Eric, who has attempted suicide, bothering her best friend Bárbara Fuenmayor, jealous of the relationship between Sofía and her boyfriend, Nico de la Vega. Sofía reassures her, pretending to have a date with a boy just met at the beach, Daniel Parra. Jenny Parra is invited to Bárbara's eighteenth birthday party, where she's approached by the ambiguous Max Zaga: the party is ruined when Daniel hits Max for kissing Jenny.
2	"El reencuentro" "The Reunion"	Chava Cartas	Melissa Palazuelos	August 6, 2013
Bárbara finds out that Nico has given an appointment to Sofía in the school dormitories during the annual meeting with the rectors of the best universities, so she says in front of everyone that Sofía attends the rehabilitation center "El reencuentro". When she learns that Eric has attempted suicide and is being hospitalized at the center, she apologizes. Daniel has to attend an anger management course, with Max as a supervisor, for beating him again during the event. Nico discovers his father is using drugs.
3	"Pijamada" "Sleepover"	Chava Cartas	Melissa Palazuelos	August 7, 2013
During Bárbara's annual sleepover, Jenny bets to flee Eric from "El reencuentro". Santiago de la Vega claims the drug is Nico's, while Sofía and Daniel go to a beach party.
4	"Un nuevo amor" "A New Love"	Chava Cartas	Victor Franco	August 8, 2013
Leonora Fuenmayor chooses Bárbara as the face of her new fashion line, but the girl isn't spontaneous, so she decides to replace her with Sofía, causing contrasts between the two friends. Liliana announces to Sofía and Eric her romantic bond with Emiliano Zaga. Daniel ends his anger management course and, after his first kiss with Sofía, receives the visit of his old friend Vanessa.
5	"Fuera máscaras" "Out of Masks"	Chava Cartas	Genaro Quiroga	August 9, 2013
Bárbara is organizing a masked ball and Nico, following the clues, must find her before midnight, but the boy is distracted by his feelings for Sofía. Jenny sneaks to the party and exchanges her mask with Sofía, thus causing a misunderstanding that leads Nico kissing her right in front of Bárbara. Bárbara leaves the party and goes to a strip club with Max, with whom she has her first time after performing in a lap dance number.
6	"Cara a cara" "Face to Face"	Chava Cartas	Paola Pérez De La Garza	August 12, 2013
Bárbara eagerly awaits the moment when, that evening, Nico will give her the engagement ring of his family. Max proposes a bet: if Nico doesn't come to the engagement party, they will spend the night together again. When Nico is spotted on the beach with Jenny, Max comforts Bárbara with a kiss, being surprised by Sofía. The next day, Bárbara and Nico breaks, while Alicia Parra arrives in Acapulco.
7	"Rostros vemos, fotos no sabemos" "We See Faces, We Don't Know About Photos"	Chava Cartas	Paola Pérez De La Garza	August 13, 2013
Sofía makes a scene at her mother because she doesn't want her to marry Emiliano, while Bárbara discovers that her father, who moved to Mexico City after the coming out, will never come back and asked for a divorce. Santiago de la Vega is investigated for fraud and for this reason his family is excluded from Galas photo shoot of the most important families of Acapulco. Their places is taken by the Parras and, as the families prepare for a group photo, the journalist shows to Marcelo Parra a photo of several years before, in which he's kissing Liliana.
8	"El debut" "The Debut"	Chava Cartas	Melissa Palazuelos	August 14, 2013
It's the day of the debutante ball, organized by Ceci López-Haro, Sofía's grandmother: the woman offers Marcelo some money so that Daniel doesn't escort Sofía, but the man refuses. Ceci then insults Daniel and, when he tells Sofía, they argue because she doesn't believe him. Nico and Bárbara have their first time, while Jenny sees Daniel and Vanessa kissing after the ball.
9	"El padre Harold" "Father Harold"	Chava Cartas	Genaro Quiroga	August 15, 2013
The bust of the founding father of Harold Institute is found broken and, because of some photos, Sofía, Bárbara, Nico, Max and Daniel are accused. The principal threatens to expel all them if the offender doesn't confess, and Daniel is worried. In the end, Sofía decides to confess she opened the glass case to avoid damage to Daniel. Nico writes a love letter to Bárbara, and they get back together.
10	"La caída" "The Fall"	Chava Cartas	Victor Franco	August 16, 2013
Gossip Girl publishes a photo of Sofía buying a pregnancy test. Not knowing Jenny is eavesdropping, Sofía tells Daniel the test is actually for Bárbara, who may be pregnant with Max's child. Even if Bárbara isn't actually pregnant, the news is published by Gossip Girl and Nico breaks up with her after learning about Max and Bárbara from Jenny.
11	"El castigo" "The Punishment"	Chava Cartas	Victor Franco	August 19, 2013
Bárbara is dethroned and asks her mother to let her leave Acapulco, but then she changes her mind thanks to Sofía. Meanwhile, Jenny begins to integrate into the group of Bárbara's former minions and becomes Paulo San Román's girlfriend. Nico has serious financial problems and starts a relation of sex and money with Lucila, a friend of his mother.
12	"Feliz cumpleaños" "Happy Birthday"	Chava Cartas	Melissa Palazuelos	August 20, 2013
Needing money, Jenny steals a dress from Vivi's house, selling it to a pawn house, but she's caught. After being seen with Eric by Daniel, Paulo tells Jenny their love story is a hoax and that he will say that the dress was a gift if she doesn't reveal his homosexuality. Jenny agrees, but Bárbara is convinced there's something strange and discovers the truth in Paulo's computer.
13	"La inauguración" "The Inauguration"	Chava Cartas	Paola Pérez De La Garza	August 21, 2013
Marcelo holds the inauguration of the hotel Boca Chica, where Bárbara shows the proof of Paulo's (and Eric's homosexuality. Lili is shocked, while Alicia decides to leave with Jenny. Ceci falls down the stairs on purpose to ruin the reputation of the hotel: at the hospital Lili learns her mother doesn't have cancer and, because of this lie, she break all ties with her. Soon after, Lili is reached by Marcelo, who announces the end of his marriage and kisses Lili.
14	"12 uvas" "12 Grapes"	Chava Cartas	Paola Pérez De La Garza	August 22, 2013
It's New Year's Eve, and Bárbara is disappointed to learn that her father Gerardo has bought a house in Mexico City along with his boyfriend Claudio because she hoped the man would remain in Acapulco. Sofía discovers Lili is going to leave with Marcelo and asks her to let him go because she loves Daniel. Then, the girl organizes a treasure hunt for Daniel and the couple makes love for the first time. Nico finds out his father is missing, Max and Bárbara become a couple, and Lili accepts Emiliano's proposal.
15	"Amistades perdidas" "Lost Friendships"	Chava Cartas	Melissa Palazuelos	August 23, 2013
Francesca, Sofía's over-protective friend, returns to Acapulco: seeing Vanessa has some interest in Daniel, she threatens her and, with Daniel's cellphone, rudely asks Vanessa to depart from the hotel Boca Chica. Leonora, impressed by Jenny's talent in fashion, hires the girl, who starts inventing excuses and lying to skip school.
16	"Pasarela de envidias" "Fashion Show of Envy"	Chava Cartas	Melissa Palazuelos	August 26, 2013
Jenny helps Leonora with the Always Fashion Show, drawing Bárbara's anger, who tries everything to ruin her, the show and, accidentally, Sofía. Sofía then decides to break their friendship, while Bárbara sees Max and Francesca kissing. Because Marcelo doesn't want her to follow her dream, Jenny moves to Nico's, while Vanessa gets a job at the hotel B Pichilingue, where Sofía and her family live.
17	"Una nueva enemiga" "A New Enemy"	Chava Cartas	Victor Franco	August 27, 2013
Jenny meets a model, Katia, who tells Jenny that Leonora is just exploiting her and her talent. Nico is worried about the people Jenny hangs out with and speaks with Daniel, who asks Leonora to fire Jenny. Francesca locks Vanessa in a refrigerator, but she's saved by Sofía and Daniel.
18	"Borrando el pasado" "Deleting the Past"	Chava Cartas	Victor Franco	August 28, 2013
Vanessa is hospitalized, watched over by Daniel and Marcelo. Meanwhile, Francesca admits she tried to kill Vanessa, but threatens Sofía to show the police a video in which Sofía pushes Francesca's brother, Ricardo, who ends up on the floor, dead. Sofía tells everything to Bárbara, who sneaks into Francesca's house, where she, Max and Nico find the rest of the video, from which they discover Ricardo just fainted. Relieved, Sofía calls Francesca's parents, who bring their daughter to Canada. Jenny resigns from Leonora's atelier and moves to Katia's house.
19	"Camino perdido" "Lost Trail"	Chava Cartas	Paola Pérez De La Garza	August 29, 2013
Max is jealous because Bárbara is dating Poncho, and Eric meets a new guy, Mauricio. Lili and Emiliano organize an art exhibition, but Jenny sneaks in with Katia and transform it in a fashion show to promote her clothes. The guests are pleasantly surprised, but Marcelo is disappointed by his daughter's behavior. The next day, he tells Lili the problems he has with Jenny and the couple kisses, even if Lili is about to marry Emiliano.
20	"Novia otra vez" "Girlfriend Again"	Chava Cartas	Paola Pérez De La Garza	August 30, 2013
Lili marries Emiliano despite Marcelo tries to change her mind. Max and Bárbara get back together after the girl discovers Poncho stole her a necklace, while Sofía breaks up with Daniel because they are too different. The next day, Bárbara is preparing to leave for New York with Max, but he abandons her at the airport after his father tells him a serious relationship entails responsibilities that will change him. Vanessa returns to live at the hotel Boca Chica and dates a doctor, Ignacio, while Jenny tries to create her own brand, but fails, as she needs her parents signature.
21	"Bajo la tierra" "Below Ground"	Chava Cartas	Melissa Palazuelos	September 2, 2013
Lili and Emiliano have a car accident in which the man dies. Federico Zaga arrives in Acapulco and shows his nephew Max some photos of Lili and Marcelo kissing, leading Max to accuse Marcelo of his father's death. Shortly after, Max discovers his father left him the majority shares of Zaga's financial empire. Jenny comes back home when Katia, after finding out that Jenny was trying to exclude her from the creation of their brand, burns all her clothes.
22	"El fantasma de Max" "Max's Ghost"	Chava Cartas	Genaro Quiroga	September 3, 2013
Federico organizes a party with the executives of the Zaga's financial empire, where the members of the board of directors find Max drunk and with two nakes girls. Not having complied with the ethics clause of the contract, Max loses his inheritance and his uncle gives him a one-way ticket to Ireland. Meanwhile, Mauricio tells Eric he has to move to Mexico City.
23	"La sustituta" "The Substitute"	Chava Cartas	Victor Franco	September 4, 2013
Daniel discovers the girl he's dating, Giovanna, is the examiner of the International Subject Test that Harold's students are going to take. Bárbara finds Max in a pub and brings him home: here, Max discovers that his father left a latest will, in which Lili is referred to as her guardian in place of Federico. The man is thus forced to abandon the chair of the manager, but, before leaving, shows Max a photo of Bárbara undressed in his apartment, bringing the boy to push her away.
24	"Prueba de vida" "Proof of Life"	Chava Cartas	Victor Franco	September 5, 2013
Bárbara, furious because Daniel surpassed her in the International Subject Test, goes to the hotel Boca Chica, where, in Vanessa's computer, finds a photo of Daniel and Giovanna kissing. Daniel is expelled from the school, but Giovanna, praised by Marcelo, asks the director to let Daniel take the test again, assuring she didn't suggest him any answer.
25	"Hasta pronto" "See You Soon"	Chava Cartas	Melissa Palazuelos	September 6, 2013
A tweet from Gossip Girl, where Sofía is called murderer, pushes the girl to tell Daniel what happened with Francesca. Lili tells Marcelo that twenty years earlier they had a son, Mariano, who was given up for adoption and lives in Mexico City. Bárbara tries to forget Max going on a dating site, while Francesca enrolls in Harold's. Nico confesses his feelings to Sofía, who reciprocates them, and Vanessa breaks up with Ignacio for Daniel, who realized he's still in love with her.
