= Tan cerca de ti, nace el amor =

- Genre: Telenovela
- Based on: Somos familia by Enrique Estevanez
- Developed by: Juan Carlos Alcalá; Rosa Salazar
- Written by: Alejandra Díaz; Mitzi Elizalde
- Directed by: Fez Noriega; Claudia Elisa Aguilar
- Starring: David Zepeda; Oka Giner; Alexis Ayala; Irina Baeva; Leticia Perdigón; Yolanda Ventura; Alfredo Gatica; Julián Gil
- Theme music composer: Jorge Eduardo Murguía; Mauricio L. Arriaga
- Opening theme: "Tan cerca de ti" by María León
- Composer: Alfonso Matehuala
- Country of origin: Mexico
- Original language: Spanish
- No. of seasons: 1
- No. of episodes: 85

Production
- Executive producer: Ignacio Sada Madero
- Producer: Arturo Pedraza Loera
- Cinematography: Alfonso Mendoza; David Celis; Jesús Nájera Saro
- Editors: Israel Flores; Felipe Ortiz Canseco
- Camera setup: Multi-camera
- Production company: TelevisaUnivision

Original release
- Network: Las Estrellas
- Release: 25 May – 18 September 2026

Tan cerca de ti, nace el amor (English: So Close To You, Love Begins) is a Mexican telenovela produced by Ignacio Sada Madero for TelevisaUnivision. It is based on the 2014 Argentine telenovela Somos familia, created by Enrique Estevanez. The series stars David Zepeda and Oka Giner. It aired on Las Estrellas from 25 May 2026 to 18 September 2026.

== Plot ==
Verónica Arellano's life was shattered in her teens when an unexpected pregnancy made her a victim of her own father, a man obsessed with morality and appearances, who took her newborn daughter away to give her up for adoption. Years later, as a journalist, Verónica embarks on a search that leads her to discover that her daughter was adopted by Susana and Luis Miranda. However, before she can reconnect, a plane crash leaves the four Miranda siblings orphaned, including Valeria, the young woman Verónica has searched for years. Joaquín Navarro, a successful businessman and Luis' best friend, takes on the responsibility of caring for the children. To stay close to her daughter without revealing her identity, Verónica adopts a double life under the name of Consuelo, a decision that will unleash conflicts, family tensions and a web of secrets that threaten to bring everything down.

== Cast ==
=== Main ===
- David Zepeda as Joaquín Navarro Luján
- Oka Giner as Verónica Arellano García / Consuelo
- Alexis Ayala as Aurelio Arellano Tapia
- Irina Baeva as Kassandra Muñoz Castro
- Leticia Perdigón as Carmen Delgado Gómez
- Yolanda Ventura as Consuelo García Santos
- Alfredo Gatica as Marcos Tovar Urrutia
- Julián Gil as Mario Novoa Olivares
- Marcia Coutiño as Lorena Esquivel Sosa
- Jaume Mateu as Iván Navarro Luján
- Lizy Martínez as Romina Arellano García
- Francisco Rubio as Nicolás Arellano Tapia
- Pierre Angelo as Roberto Flores
- Mimi Morales as Isaura Castro Olivares
- Laura Montijano as Olga Fajardo Torrado
- Andrés Vázquez as Hugo González Delgado
- Ariana Saavedra as Valeria Miranda Ibarra
- André Graham as Eleazar Cervera Esquivel
- Jaime Maqueo as Diego Miranda Ibarra
- Paola Hasanny as Claudia Esquivel Sosa
- Ariadna Jardón as María José "Majo" Navarro Fajardo
- Bárbara Carbajal as Nayeli Perez García
- Sofía Zavala as Rebeca Novoa Millán
- Natalia Álvarez as Esmeralda Blanco Cortez
- Paula Cacho as Daniela Miranda Ibarra
- Karla Galván as Melissa Miranda Ibarra
- María José Parga as Alexa Flores
- Kaled Acab as Bruno García Santos
- Alejandro Ávila as Facundo Cervera Tovar
- Verónica Jaspeado as Nuria Miranda Salas

=== Recurring and guest stars ===
- Mane de la Parra as Luis Miranda Salas
- Daniela Cordero as Susana Ibarra de Miranda
- Wendy Braga as Beatriz
- Nailé López as Fernanda
- Mariana Balderas as Lupita
- Roberto Tello as Polo
- Vanessa de la Sotta as Alma Cortez Jirón
- Esteban Franco as Felipe
- Iñaki Echeverria as Renán Bermúdez

== Production ==
On 12 September 2025, David Zepeda and Oka Giner were announced in the lead roles of Somos familia. The complete cast was announced on 7 November 2025. On 26 September 2025, Irina Baeva was announced as the antagonist of the telenovela. Filming of the telenovela took place from 3 December 2025 to 17 May 2026. In February 2026, Tan cerca de ti, nace el amor was announced as the official title of the telenovela.

== Ratings ==
Viewership and ratings per season of Tan cerca de ti, nace el amor
Season	Timeslot (CT)	Episodes	First aired		Last aired		Avg. viewers (millions)
Season	Timeslot (CT)	Episodes	Date	Viewers (millions)	Date	Viewers (millions)	Avg. viewers (millions)
1	Mon–Fri 8:30 p.m.	83	25 May 2026	4.23	18 September 2026	4.73	4.18

== Episodes ==
No.	Title	Original release date	Mexico viewers (millions)
1	"Primer encuentro"	25 May 2026	4.23
2	"Me llamo Consuelo"	26 May 2026	4.53
3	"No te importamos"	27 May 2026	4.59
4	"¿Se conocen?"	28 May 2026	4.53
5	"Mi hija me necesita"	29 May 2026	4.04
6	"¿No te gustaría ser mamá?"	1 June 2026	4.04
7	"Estaré para ti, siempre"	2 June 2026	4.55
8	"Mi mamá me abandonó"	3 June 2026	4.37
9	"Te vas arrepentir"	4 June 2026	3.85
10	"Perdóname hermana"	5 June 2026	4.27
11	"Kassandra deslumbra con su belleza"	8 June 2026	4.10
12	"Verónica Arellano"	9 June 2026	4.49
13	"Valeria es mi hija"	10 June 2026	4.38
14	"Te tengo en mis manos"	11 June 2026	4.12
15	"No debió pasar"	12 June 2026	3.57
16	"Ya no finja más"	15 June 2026	4.05
17	"Es la firma de Luis"	16 June 2026	4.44
18	"Se veía hermosa"	17 June 2026	4.15
19	"Te metiste con Luis"	18 June 2026	2.20
20	"Cuando te mira, te toca el alma"	19 June 2026	4.09
21	"Hola Verónica"	22 June 2026	3.96
22	"Ya encontré a mi hija"	23 June 2026	3.91
23	"Te extraño"	24 June 2026	1.85
24	"Beso en la oscuridad"	25 June 2026	4.14
25	"No olvides cuál es tu lugar"	26 June 2026	4.08
26	"¿Hay algo entre Joaquín y Verónica?"	29 June 2026	3.63
27	"Diego escucha la voz de Meli y rompe en llanto"	30 June 2026	1.15
28	"¿Eres la mamá de Nayeli?"	1 July 2026	4.19
29	"Con Valeria no"	2 July 2026	4.21
30	"Consuelo, la necesito cerca"	3 July 2026	4.01
31	"Es carísimo igual que tú"	6 July 2026	4.31
32	"No estamos listos para vivir juntos"	7 July 2026	4.46
33	"Te quiero, Consuelo"	8 July 2026	4.70
34	"Lengua de serpiente"	9 July 2026	4.60
35	"La guerra la voy a ganar yo"	10 July 2026	4.16
36	"¿Eres Valeria?"	13 July 2026	4.49
37	"Ella es Verónica"	14 July 2026	4.15
38	"Me lo van a matar"	15 July 2026	4.15
39	"Grandes amigas"	16 July 2026	4.16
40	"Me das asco, Verónica"	17 July 2026	4.49
41	"Me gustaría ser papá"	20 July 2026	4.21
42	"Seré abuela"	21 July 2026	4.49
43	"No confiaré en ti, Consuelo"	22 July 2026	4.23
44	"Verónica, quiero que seas mi esposa"	23 July 2026	4.69
45	"El padre de Claudia se llama Nicolás"	24 July 2026	4.27
46	"No merezco el amor de Chelo"	27 July 2026	4.19
47	"Soy la exesposa de Facundo"	28 July 2026	4.22
48	"Quiero ser la mamá de Valeria"	29 July 2026	4.58
49	"Tienes una hija y se llama Claudia"	30 July 2026	4.20
50	"Nada de lo que siento es una mentira"	31 July 2026	4.17
51	"Tú eres mi papá"	3 August 2026	4.55
52	"No me grites, Facundo"	4 August 2026	4.19
53	"¡Facundo, tú vendiste la fotografía!"	5 August 2026	4.15
54	"¡Valeria es tu sobrina!"	6 August 2026	4.03
55	"Valeria es hija de Verónica"	7 August 2026	4.42
56	"¿Él es mi papá?"	10 August 2026	4.19
57	"Esto se acabó, Facundo"	11 August 2026	4.20
58	"Apareció su tía Nuria Miranda"	12 August 2026	4.39
59	"Gracias Consuelo"	13 August 2026	N/A
60	"¡Familia, estoy de regreso!"	14 August 2026	4.59
61	"Vete de esta casa, Joaquín"	17 August 2026	4.32
62	"¡Bienvenida a la familia, Valeria!"	18 August 2026	N/A
63	"Le va a pedir matrimonio a Kassandra"	19 August 2026	4.37
64	"¡Este anillo jamás será tuyo!"	20 August 2028	4.52
65	"Soy Verónica Arellano"	21 August 2026	4.39
66	"Joaquín, Valeria es mi hija"	24 August 2026	4.53
67	"¡Eres un traidor, Facundo!"	25 August 2026	4.32
68	"Facundo es el asesino"	26 August 2026	4.58
69	"El final de Facundo"	27 August 2026	4.74
70	"¡Joaquín y Consuelo son novios!"	28 August 2026	3.76
71	"No voy a ser feliz con Mario"	31 August 2026	4.17
72	"Verónica, nunca te olvidé"	1 September 2026	4.31
73	"Mario jamás puede saber que Valeria es su hija"	2 September 2026	4.50
74	"Conseguiste meter a Joaquín en tu cama"	3 September 2026	4.29
75	"Mario, déjame en paz"	4 September 2026	4.24
76	"Te sigo amando, Verónica"	7 September 2026	4.12
77	"Mario es el padre de Valeria"	8 September 2026	4.22
78	"¡Valeria Miranda es nuestra hija!"	9 September 2026	4.70
79	"Consuelo y Verónica Arellano son la misma persona"	10 September 2026	4.65
80	"¡Valeria es hija de Verónica Arellano!"	11 September 2026	4.32
81	"¡Verónica Arellano es tu madre!"	14 September 2026	4.25
82	"Verónica, solo eres la señora que me parió y me abandonó"	15 September 2026	3.58
83	"Valeria, soy tu padre y ahora me tienes a mí"	16 September 2026	3.99
84	"Te amo, mamá"	17 September 2026	4.31
85	"Por nuestros hijos"	18 September 2026	4.73

== Release ==
Tan cerca de ti, nace el amor premiered first in the United States on Vix on 1 May 2026, with five episodes being released each week up until the finale on 21 August 2026. In Mexico, the telenovela premiered on Las Estrellas on 25 May 2026.
