= The Watchful Eye =

2023 American drama TV series

- Promotional release poster
- Genre: Drama; Mystery; Thriller
- Created by: Julie Durk
- Showrunner: Emily Fox
- Starring: Mariel Molino; Warren Christie; Amy Acker; Jon Ecker; Aliyah Royale; Lex Lumpkin; Henry Joseph Samiri; Kelly Bishop
- Music by: René G. Boscio
- Country of origin: United States
- Original language: English
- No. of seasons: 1
- No. of episodes: 10

Production
- Executive producers: Jeffrey Reiner; Ryan Seacrest; Andrea Shay; Nina Wass; Emily Fox
- Producers: Danielle Weinstock; Joe DeOliveira
- Production locations: Burnaby, British Columbia, Canada
- Cinematography: Scott Williams
- Editors: Louise A. Innes; Scott van Beever; Seagan Ngai; Luis Colina; Brian Beal; Jeffrey A. Stallman; Vanessa Ruane
- Running time: 41–45 minutes
- Production companies: Ryan Seacrest Productions; ABC Signature

Original release
- Network: Freeform
- Release: January 30 – March 27, 2023

The Watchful Eye is an American drama mystery thriller television series created by Julie Durk that aired from January 30 to March 27, 2023, on Freeform. In June 2023, the series was cancelled after one season.

== Cast and characters ==
=== Main ===
- Mariel Molino as Elena Santos, a recently hired live-in nanny who moves into The Greybourne
- Warren Christie as Matthew Ward, a wealthy architect who recently lost his wife
- Amy Acker as Tory Ayres, Matthew's sister-in-law
- Jon Ecker as Scott Macedo, Elena's scheming secret boyfriend who is a detective
- Aliyah Royale as Ginny Welles, Elena's new friend who is a nanny at The Greybourne
- Lex Lumpkin as Elliot Schwartz, a teenager who lives in The Greybourne that becomes friends with Elena
- Henry Joseph Samiri as Jasper Ward, Matthew's young son who recently lost his mother
- Kelly Bishop as Mrs. Ivey, a longtime resident at The Greybourne and the aunt of Matthew's wife

=== Recurring ===
- Grace Kaufman as Bennet Ayres, Tory's eldest stepdaughter
- Christopher Redman as Dick Ayres, Tory's husband who is a doctor
- Megan Best as Darcy Ayres, Tory's youngest stepdaughter
- Baraka Rahmani as Alex Toubassy, one of Elena's nanny friends
- Clare Filipow as Kim Stewart, another nanny friend of Elena's
- Emily Tennant as Allie Ward, Matthew's deceased wife
- Lachlan Quarmby as James Gianfranco, a nanny who is a friend of Ginny's
- Jacqueline Obradors as Ronnie, Elena's scheming mother
- Andres Velez as Roman, Elena's best friend who works a doorman at The Greybourne
- Aaron Douglas as Otis Winthrop III

In addition, Elyse Maloway co-stars as Jocelyn Morrow, a nanny who worked for Iris and Alistair Greybourne.

== Production ==
=== Development ===
On September 13, 2021, Freeform gave the series a pilot order. On June 30, 2022, The Watchful Eye was picked up to series by Freeform. The series is created by Julie Durk and executive produced by Emily Fox, Ryan Seacrest, Nina Wass, Andrea Shay, and Jeffrey Reiner. Fox also serves as the showrunner. Reiner directed the pilot. Ryan Seacrest Productions and ABC Signature are producing the series. On July 15, 2022, René G. Boscio was hired as the composer for the series. On June 30, 2023, Freeform cancelled the series after one season.

=== Casting ===
Upon the pilot order announcement, Andrea Londo, Warren Christie, Kelly Bishop, Amy Acker, Jon Ecker, Lex Lumpkin, Henry Joseph Samiri, and Aliyah Royale were cast to star. On June 30, 2022, it was reported that Mariel Molino replaced Londo in the lead role who was cast in the pilot.

=== Filming ===
Filming for the series began April 26, 2022 and concluded on September 1, 2022, in Burnaby, British Columbia, Canada.

== Episodes ==
No.	Title	Directed by	Written by	Original release date	U.S. viewers (millions)
1	"Hen in the Fox House"	Jeffrey Reiner	Julie Durk	January 30, 2023	0.180
2	"Hide and Seek"	Jeffrey Reiner	Emmylou Diaz	January 30, 2023	0.131
3	"The Nanny Who Knew Too Much"	Charissa Sanjarernsuithikul	Chloé Hung	February 6, 2023	0.105
4	"The Nanny Vanishes"	Jeffrey Reiner	Alicia Carroll	February 13, 2023	0.133
5	"Stairway to Eleven"	Shana Stein	Lenn K. Rosenfeld	February 20, 2023	0.146
6	"Save New York"	Joy T. Lane	Jordan Roter	February 27, 2023	0.131
7	"Out Like a Light"	Patricia Cardoso	Emmylou Diaz & Elyse Morales	March 6, 2023	0.079
8	"Spellbound"	Daniel Willis	Rebecca Kirsch	March 13, 2023	0.077
9	"The Serpent's Tooth"	Michael Trim	Alex Levy & Michael V. Ross	March 20, 2023	0.088
10	"Hale Fellow Well Met"	Jeffrey Reiner	Emily Fox	March 27, 2023	0.097

== Broadcast ==
The Watchful Eye premiered on Freeform on January 30, 2023, with two new episodes. It also simulcasted the two-episode premiere on ABC Spark in Canada the same day. The series later became available to stream on Hulu. The series was removed on Hulu on July 1, 2023.

== Reception ==
=== Critical response ===
The review aggregator website Rotten Tomatoes reported a 67% approval rating with an average rating of 5.5/10, based on 6 critic reviews. Metacritic, which uses a weighted average, assigned a score of 57 out of 100 based on 4 critics, indicating "mixed or average reviews".

Judy Berman of Time stated, "The Watchful Eye has no highbrow aspirations. It's just a solidly built thriller, with a smartly assembled cast of characters and well-executed plot beats, whose brisk pace guarantees a consistently exhilarating watch. At a time when so many shows reach for prestige signifiers that exceed their grasp, that lack of pretense is as refreshing as it is fun." Anna Govert of Paste gave the show a grade of 8.4 out of 10, writing, "With a compelling cast of characters and an unending swath of secrets to uncover, The Watchful Eye is instantly addictive, and has all the potential to become your next TV obsession. As the walls begin to close in around Elena, it'The Watchful Eye absolutely worth keeping an eye out for."

=== Ratings ===
Viewership and ratings per episode of The Watchful Eye
No.	Title	Air date	Rating (18–49)	Viewers (millions)
1	"Hen in the Fox House"	January 30, 2023	0.06	0.180
2	"Hide and Seek"	January 30, 2023	0.05	0.131
3	"The Nanny Who Knew Too Much"	February 6, 2023	0.04	0.105
4	"The Nanny Vanishes"	February 13, 2023	0.05	0.133
5	"Stairway to Eleven"	February 20, 2023	0.04	0.146
6	"Save New York"	February 27, 2023	0.04	0.131
7	"Out Like a Light"	March 6, 2023	0.03	0.079
8	"Spellbound"	March 13, 2023	0.02	0.077
9	"The Serpent's Tooth"	March 20, 2023	0.03	0.088
10	"Hale Fellow Well Met"	March 27, 2023	0.03	0.097

=== Accolades ===
The series won Best Drama/Action Poster for a TV/Streaming Series at the 2023 Golden Trailer Awards.
