= Jon-Michael Ecker =

American actor

Jon Ecker
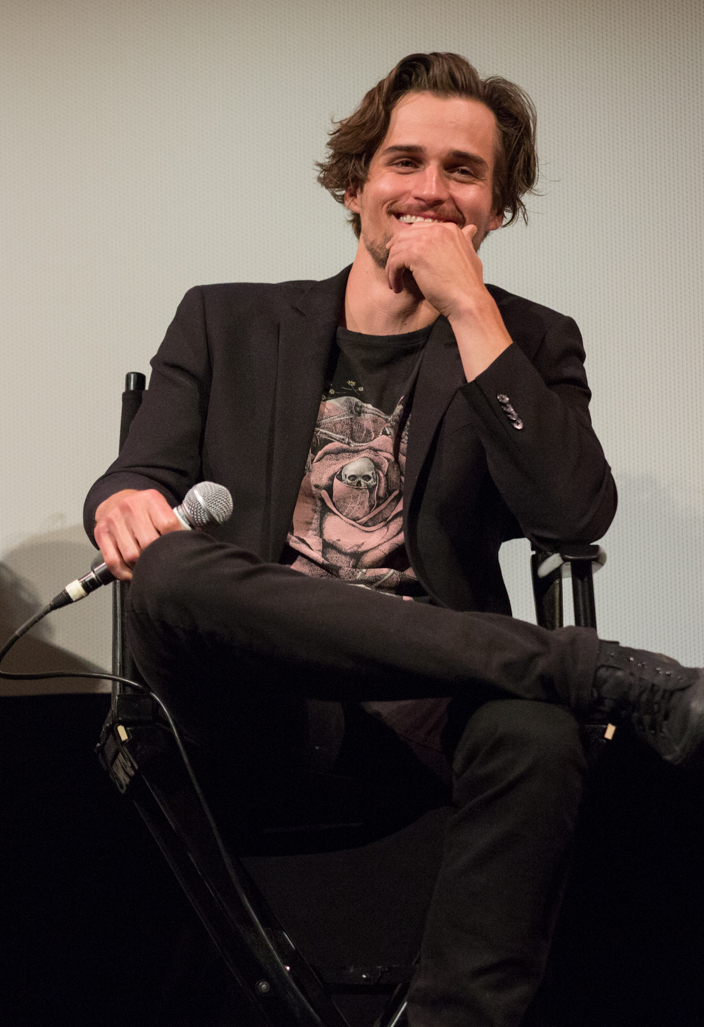
- Ecker in June 2016
- Born: Jon-Michael William Ecker; March 16, 1983 (age 43); San Marcos, Texas, U.S.
- Occupation: Actor
- Years active: 2010–present
- Spouse: Laura James (m. 2022)
- Children: 2
- Father: Guy Ecker

Jon-Michael William Ecker (born March 16, 1983) is an American actor. He is known for his roles as Aaron Morales in Popland!, Pablo Peralta in the telenovela Corazón valiente, Nicolás de la Vega in Gossip Girl: Acapulco, Marlon Brando in the film Cantinflas and Güero Dávila in Queen of the South.

He is the son of Brazilian-born American actor Guy Ecker.

== Filmography ==
=== Film roles ===
| Year | Title | Roles | Notes |
|---|---|---|---|
| 2014 | Cantinflas | Marlon Brando | |
| 2021 | Gingerbread Miracle | Alex | |

=== Television roles ===
| Year | Title | Roles | Notes |
|---|---|---|---|
| 2010 | Niña de mi corazón | El Mudra | |
| 2011 | El Equipo | Mike | Episodes: "La escritora" and "Los periodistas" |
| 2011 | La fuerza del destino | Croupier | Episode: "Vuelve a caer" |
| 2011 | Popland! | Ari Morales | Main role |
| 2012–2013 | Corazón valiente | Pablo Peralta | Main role |
| 2013 | Gossip Girl: Acapulco | Nicolás "Nico" de la Vega | Main role |
| 2015 | Major Crimes | Jake | Episode: "Blackout" |
| 2015–2016 | Narcos | The Lion | 4 episodes |
| 2016–2019 | Queen of the South | Güero Dávila | Recurring role (season 2); guest role (seasons 1, 3 & 4) |
| 2016 | NCIS: New Orleans | Ramon Morel | Episode: "Outlaws" |
| 2017 | Criminal Minds | Zeke Daniels | Episode: "Seek and Destroy" |
| 2018 | Sideswiped | Bobby Garcia | Episode: "Hard Maybe" |
| 2021 | Chicago Fire | Lieutenant Greg Grainger | Recurring role (season 9) |
| 2021 | Firefly Lane | Max Brody | Recurring role |
| 2021 | Gingerbread Miracle | Alejandro "Alex" Casillas | |
| 2023 | The Watchful Eye | Scott | Main role |
| 2025 | Doc | Dr. Jake Heller | Main role |
