= Perdona nuestros pecados (Mexican TV series) =

- Genre: Telenovela
- Based on: Perdona nuestros pecados by Pablo Illanes
- Developed by: Lucero Suárez; Jimena Merodio
- Written by: Carmen Eugenia Sepúlveda Gutiérrez; Luis Alberto Reynoso Gutiérrez
- Directed by: Santiago Barbosa; Jorge Robles
- Starring: Jorge Salinas; Erika Buenfil; César Évora; Sabine Moussier; Marisol del Olmo; Emmanuel Palomares; Oka Giner
- Theme music composer: José Luis Roma; J. Eduardo Murguía; Mauricio L. Arriaga
- Opening theme: "Beso prohibido" by Río Roma
- Composer: Christian Moreno
- Country of origin: Mexico
- Original language: Spanish
- No. of seasons: 1
- No. of episodes: 90

Production
- Executive producer: Lucero Suárez
- Producer: Ángel Villaverde
- Editors: Mauricio Cortés; Norma Ramírez
- Production company: TelevisaUnivision

Original release
- Network: Las Estrellas
- Release: 30 January – 2 June 2023

Perdona nuestros pecados (English title: Family Sins) is a Mexican television series produced by Lucero Suárez for TelevisaUnivision. It is based on the Chilean telenovela of the same name, created by Pablo Illanes. The series stars Emmanuel Palomares and Oka Giner. It aired on Las Estrellas from 30 January 2023 to 2 June 2023.

== Premise ==
Elsa Quiroga (Oka Giner) is the daughter of Armando Quiroga (Jorge Salinas), the richest man in the town of San Juan. She falls in love with Andrés Martínez (Emmanuel Palomares), son of Silvia (Marisol del Olmo), the Montero family's maid. Elsa and Andrés decide to have a secret relationship, and when Armando discovers it, he opposes of the relationship because for him, Andrés is not worthy of his daughter's love.

== Cast ==
=== Main ===
- Jorge Salinas as Armando Quiroga
- Erika Buenfil as Estela Cáceres
- César Évora as Héctor Morales
- Sabine Moussier as Ángela Bulnes de Montero
- Marisol del Olmo as Silvia Martínez
- Emmanuel Palomares as Andrés Martínez
- Oka Giner as Elsa Quiroga
- Osvaldo de León as Gerardo Montero
- Ricardo Fastlicht as Lamberto Montero
- Óscar Bonfiglio as Father Reynaldo
- Montserrat Marañón as Flor
- Rocío de Santiago as Antonia Martínez
- Fernanda Urdapilleta as Aurora Montero
- Giuseppe Gamba as Horacio Morales
- Daniela Cordero as Elena Quiroga
- Karla Farfán as Meche Morales
- Gina Pedret as Guillermina
- Carlo Guerra as Carlos Morales
- Sofía Mariel Espejel as Sofía Quiroga
- Pato de la Garza as Martín Quiroga
- Fausto Emiliano as Domingo Quiroga
- Hugo Aceves as Oliver
- Ricardo Kleinbaum as Dr. Leonidas
- Giovanna Duffour as Ingrid
- Adrián Laut as Renzo

=== Recurring ===
- Magda Karina as Clemencia
- Luz Edith Rojas as Nora
- Olivia Collins as Irene Cáceres
- Enoc Leaño as Comisario Fuentes
- Gloria Sierra as Commander Natalia

== Production ==
In May 2022, the series was announced at TelevisaUnivision's upfront for the 2022–2023 television season. Filming began on 12 October 2022. On 25 October 2022, an extensive cast and characters list was published. The first teaser of the series was shown on 2 January 2023. The series is set to premiere on 30 January 2023.

== Episodes ==
No.	Title	Original release date	Mexico viewers (millions)
1	"Nadie puede impedir nuestro amor"	30 January 2023 (Note: Premiered early online through Las Estrellas website on 27 January 2023.)	2.6
Elsa and Andrés enjoy their love but she decides to keep it a secret as she knows that her father will never accept their relationship. On the night of his wedding anniversary with Estela, Armando decides to celebrate with Ángela. While Elsa and Andrés stroll through San Miguel, Elena sees them; despite Elsa's pleas, Elena tells Armando about the relationship. Silvia begs Lamberto to intercede for Andrés since his son is in danger because of his relationship with Elsa; Aurora overhears them. Armando learns that Elsa has met with Andrés again, he decides to send him to jail to get him out of his daughter's life.
2	"Lo mejor es que te alejes"	31 January 2023	2.7
Aurora despises Elsa for being Andrés' girlfriend, Elsa warns her that until she changes her mind, they cannot remain friends. Silvia and Flor advise Elsa to stay away from Andrés, but she is willing to fight whoever it takes to be with him. Ángela confronts Silvia for being Lamberto's lover. Andrés rejects Lamberto as his father, then rejects Silvia for having lied to him all his life. Ángela meets with Armando at the cabin and they give themselves to passion without realizing that someone has already seen them.
3	"¡Vámonos juntos!"	1 February 2023	2.4
Armando receives an envelope with photos of him and Ángela. Estela asks Ángela to investigate Armando. Thanks to Lamberto's support, Andrés is released from prison. Andrés tells Elsa that he will leave San Juan and proposes to run away together. Armando takes the money to the agreed place, the blackmailer attacks him by surprise to avoid being recognized. Elena overhears Armando talking to Ángela about the blackmail; she looks for the blackmailer to complain about his work. Andrés takes Elsa to the warehouse where they will spend the night before fleeing.
4	"No me condenes"	2 February 2023	2.5
Estela, desperate to find Elsa, visits Silvia and asks for answers about Andrés' whereabouts. Armando stops all the buses until he finds Elsa, she decides to show her face so that Andrés can escape. Elena decides to cancel her wedding because of Armando's absence, but he arrives just in time. Estela tries to convince Armando to let Elsa stay in town, but he no longer trusts his daughter to keep her word and prefers to send her to boarding school abroad. Elena decides to put an end to Armando's blackmailer and takes her father's gun to confront them.
5	"Muerto el perro se acabó la rabia"	3 February 2023	2.7
Elena is injured from her encounter with the detective, in the hospital, she confesses to Armando that she was the one who hired the detective to follow him. Armando confronts the detective, he threatens to make the photos public; Armando summons him to the cabin to pay for his silence. Elsa believes that her sacrifice was not worth it, because she can't stand another minute separated from Andrés and feels that Armando only cares about appearances. Lamberto thinks it was a mistake to have separated from Silvia, he asks her if she would give him a chance if he were to separate from Ángela. Armando realizes the danger he is exposing himself to by maintaining his relationship with Ángela so he puts an end to it.
6	"No puedes alejarla de la familia"	6 February 2023	N/A
Armando does not give up on sending Elsa to boarding school, he finds a way to send her to Chihuahua. Estela visits Ángela and finds her drunk, she confesses to being in love with someone other than Lamberto, Armando arrives in time to prevent her from confessing who it is. Armando warns Lamberto that he will attack Andrés if he returns to San Juan; Lamberto responds to the threat. Ángela convinces Armando to get back together, Estela almost sees them but Elena manages to prevent this from happening. Estela tries to convince Armando not to send Elsa to boarding school, the argument gets heated and Elsa intercedes for Estela.
7	"Es mi mejor amiga!"	7 February 2023	2.7
Elsa warns Estela about the way Armando treats her, Estela promises that it will be a thing of the past. Estela confronts Armando to prevent him from sending Elsa to boarding school, he assures her that the problems at home will end when he calms his daughter down. Armando tries to ridicule Héctor's political postulation, but Héctor makes Armando see that he knows more secrets than he thought. Elsa warns Estela about the conversation she overheard between Ángela and Armando along with her suspicions that they are lovers. Armando threatens Héctor to stay away from Estela, Héctor defends himself by showing how much he knows about his humble origins.
8	"Yo no soy un asesino"	8 February 2023	3.0
Elsa asks Toña to tell Andrés that she will be sent to a boarding school in Chihuahua, when she tries to call him, he doesn't answer. Remedios invites Andrés to go to the movies, he accepts. Ángela discovers that the missing man is Detective Olmos, who has been following her and Armando, so she fears being linked to his disappearance. The police question Elena about her connection to Detective Arturo Olmos, Gerardo finds out and decides to accompany her to hear her statement. Estela decides to follow Ángela, she sees Armando arrive and confirms that he is sleeping with her.
9	"¡Váyanse al infierno!"	9 February 2023	2.7
Estela confronts Armando but Ángela tries to defend their affair, Estela slaps her for her betrayal and throws her against a piece of furniture. Elsa begins her life at the boarding school and realizes that her stay will be hell. Armando searches everywhere for Estela without knowing where she is, and the family begins to notice her disappearance. While Ángela sleeps in the hospital, Estela decides to pay her a surprise visit so they can talk without interruptions.
10	"¡Yo no estoy loca!"	10 February 2023	2.5
Estela arrives home and inadvertently hits Domingo with her car. Armando commits Estela to a psychiatric clinic arguing that the accident drove her crazy. Andrés and Remedios enjoy an evening together and she kisses him. Gerardo notices inconsistencies in what Ángela says about the accident and confronts her to tell the truth.
11	"Voy a borrarle la memoria"	13 February 2023	2.6
Determined to prevent his infidelity from becoming known, Armando authorizes for Estela to undergo shock therapy. Ángela attends a campaign event at Héctor's hotel; upon seeing Silvia, she tries to ridicule her but only makes her drunkenness evident. With Luis' help, Andrés manages to infiltrate the boarding school where Elsa is and they meet to plan her escape.
12	"Ya no te tengo miedo"	14 February 2023	3.0
Elsa manages to communicate with her sister Sofía, she tells her how things are going at home and Elsa worries when she learns that Estela is in a psychiatric clinic. Aurora tells Ángela about her engagement to Carlos. The police continue the investigation of the detective's death and find the photos with which he was blackmailing Armando. Elsa interrogates Armando for having Estela committed, she demands to see her despite his threats because she is no longer afraid of him, Armando responds with threats.
13	"Orden de aprehensión"	15 February 2023	2.8
Elsa confronts Ángela for being her father's mistress; Ángela slaps Elsa. Armando questions Elsa about Andrés being in town; she assures him that she will not approach him, but Armando threatens her. With Armando's permission, Elsa visits Estela in the psychiatric clinic and is surprised to see her condition. Commander Fuentes arrests Armando as a suspect in the investigator's death.
14	"Una noche con su amante"	16 February 2023	3.2
Lamberto asks Ángela for a divorce but she refuses. The commissioner takes advantage of the private meeting with Ángela to try to reach an agreement so that Armando can be released. Elsa has several pregnancy-related symptoms, Flor recommends her to take a test. Andrés confronts Aurora for her attitude after learning that he is her brother, Ángela injures him and justifies her action by defending her daughter.
15	"Una oportunidad de vengarnos"	17 February 2023	N/A
Ángela orders Aurora to insist that Andrés attacked her to make him pay but Aurora's silence makes Lamberto and Gerardo doubt the accusations. Andrés denounces Ángela for attempted murder. Armando complains to Father Reynaldo for having accompanied Elsa on her visit to the psychiatric clinic and threatens him not to meddle in his family's affairs again. Ángela fears what will happen on the date with the Commander Fuentes but still agrees to his demands.
16	"¡Sácame de aquí!"	20 February 2023	2.9
After sleeping with Commander Fuentes, Ángela tries to go home, but he prevents her from leaving. Elsa confirms her pregnancy and tells Andrés, who is happy with the news. Aurora talks to Horacio of her doubts about whether or not to marry Carlos, he overhears them and confronts Aurora. Silvia tells Lamberto that Ángela has a lover. Estela reacts when she sees Gerardo at the psychiatric clinic and tells him that Armando has locked her up. Lamberto confronts Ángela; when she refuses to talk about it, he decides to lock her in the house until she confesses the truth.
17	"Yo te voy a sacar de aquí"	21 February 2023	2.9
Gerardo discusses with Armando his visit to Estela, Armando rejects any defense and threatens Gerardo not to mention the subject of the alleged mistress again. Gerardo warns Héctor of Estela's health condition and asks him to take care of the matter to avoid further problems with Armando. Guillermina visits Armando to tell him that she overheard Elsa and Father Reynaldo talking about some tragedy if he were to find out. Héctor visits the psychiatric clinic and manages to get to Estela's room, seeing her condition he decides to help her escape.
18	"Tenemos que mantenerla en secreto"	22 February 2023	2.9
Gerardo checks Ángela for her discomfort and realizes that she is covered in bruises, she accuses Lamberto of having hurt her. Estela is afraid to return to the clinic, so Héctor hides her at the hotel under a different name. Armando finds out that Estela escaped from the psychiatric clinic with Héctor's help, and his discomfort worsens. At the New Year's party, Aurora drunkenly kisses Horacio.
19	"Manchaste el nombre de la familia"	23 February 2023	3.1
Guillermina reveals to Armando that Elsa is expecting Andrés' child. Father Reynaldo confesses to Andrés that Armando already knows about Elsa's pregnancy. Armando warns Andrés that he will not let him be near Elsa and her child. Silvia answers the call from one of the hotel rooms and is surprised to see Estela.
20	"Tu bebé no va a nacer"	24 February 2023	2.9
Elena finds a phone that Elsa has to communicate with Andrés and takes it away from her. Aurora and her family testify about what happened with Andrés, Aurora follows her mother's advice and accuses Andrés of a crime he did not commit. Horacio questions Aurora because he wants to know what happened between her and Carlos. Elsa is surprised by Armando when he shows up with a woman who will help her abort her son.
21	"¡Está cometiendo un pecado!"	27 February 2023	2.9
Aurora and Horacio spend the night together but are almost caught by Carlos. Armando forces Elsa to abort her baby, but father Reynaldo shows up to prevent it. Elena finds Elsa talking on the phone with Andrés and in trying to prevent her from doing it again, she throws Elsa down the stairs. Gerardo overhears Ángela's conversation and confronts her about his suspicions about her lover.
22	"¡Queda usted arrestado!"	28 February 2023	2.8
Elsa manages to talk to Andrés before Aurora's wedding, she warns him about her father's plans to send her away and they agree to flee the same day. Andrés is taken to the police station because of Ángela's accusation of trying to abuse Aurora. Estela asks Elsa about her absence, Elsa confesses to being pregnant by Andrés. Elsa sees Armando kissing Ángela and confronts them for their lies and for having locked her mother in the psychiatric clinic.
23	"No se puede tapar el sol con un dedo"	1 March 2023	3.0
Armando tries to explain to Elsa that he is sending her away to protect her. Commander Fuentes warns Ángela about the inconsistencies he has found in the statements and asks her for another night together in exchange for keeping quiet about what he knows. Irene, Estela's sister, shows up at Armando's house demanding answers about Estela's disappearance. Guillermina remembers how she was forced to get rid of a child she was expecting on Armando's orders and, unable to keep quiet any longer, she goes to Father Reynaldo for advice.
24	"Aquí no serás una malcriada"	2 March 2023	2.6
Estela is surprised to hear that Armando is outside her room looking for Irene and has only one solution, to confront him. Elsa insists on being close to Flor all the time but Clemencia, fed up with her attitude, slaps her. Armando makes Ángela believe that he managed to discourage Fuentes from spending one more night with her when in reality they agreed on much more than that. During breakfast Armando suffers another attack.
25	"Te vas a refundir en la cárcel"	3 March 2023	2.5
Nora and Elsa share their suffering for living a forbidden love. Flor tells Elsa that her father has been supporting Clemencia all this time. Commander Fuentes informs Silvia that the judge has ordered Andrés to be transferred to the prison until the day of his trial. Aurora fakes a scene of jealousy to Carlos when in reality she begins to regret having married him.
26	"Tomar el toro por los cuernos"	6 March 2023	2.5
Irene takes Father Reynaldo to Estela, where she tells him her reasons for hiding and asks for his help in taking care of her children. Clemencia tries to make Elsa ride a horse while she is pregnant. Lamberto and Silvia visit Andrés in prison, he tells them all about Elsa's pregnancy and his escape attempt; he decides to accept Lamberto's last name.
27	"¡Salva a tu madre de la cárcel!"	7 March 2023	2.9
Fuentes tries to sleep with Ángela, but Gerardo arrives to save her; she shoots Fuentes to put an end to his blackmail. Gerardo returns and discovers that Fuentes died, but Ángela asks him to hide the secret for fear of going to jail. Elsa confronts Nora about her affair with Iván, her stepfather. Irene warns Armando that Estela has returned; when Estela sees him again, she freezes with resentment for his actions.
28	"No me volveré a separar de ustedes"	8 March 2023	2.9
Armando returns home with Estela, but despite what she says, he suspects that she may be lying. Ángela informs Armando about what happened with Fuentes and complains to him for using her as a bargaining chip in his deal. Silvia visits Armando to come to an agreement about her grandson. Ángela follows Armando's advice and visits Estela, both pretend to be best friends as if nothing had happened.
29	"¿Cómo te metes con la mujer de tu hermano?"	9 March 2023	3.0
Irene confronts Hector for being in love with Estela, he does not hide it, but recognizes that Armando is the main obstacle to his happiness. Clemencia overhears Nora's complaints about Iván, but Elsa saves her; Clemencia threatens her for covering up for Nora. Gerardo visits the hotel and talks with Toña, Elena sees them and accuses them of being lovers. Héctor confronts Aurora for having an affair with Horacio and demands an end to it.
30	"Soy la accionista principal"	10 March 2023	3.0
Despite Elena's refusals, Gerardo takes her to a specialist to solve their problems in bed. Irene criticizes Armando for his power in the company and threatens to fire him if Estela is hospitalized again. Clemencia discovers the relationship between Iván and Nora. Horacio and Aurora sleep together but are caught by Héctor.
31	"Culpable del delito que se le imputa"	13 March 2023	2.9
Aurora asks Horacio to forget about her, but he refuses and offers to go to the city. Elsa clarifies to Irene the situation in which Nora and Iván find themselves and intercedes for Nora to be released. Gerardo tries again to take Elena to therapy, where the therapist interrogates her about the possibility that she has suffered in the past. The judge finds Andrés guilty and sentences him to eight years in prison.
32	"Nunca vamos a ser felices"	14 March 2023	2.6
Irene takes Elsa to the doctor, where she hears her baby’s heartbeat for the first time. Horacio complains to Aurora for leaving him, she tells him that it was the best solution to what was happening between the two of them. Armando asks Gerardo to put a stop to Elena's therapies and at Gerardo's insistence, Armando confesses that his suspicions about Elena's childhood are true.
33	"Tu bebé ya va a nacer"	15 March 2023	3.0
In response to Gerardo's complaints, Armando threatens to separate him from Elena, Ángela intercedes and asks Gerardo to keep quiet about their affair. Gerardo finds Ángela passed out and blames it on alcohol. Father Reynaldo tries to prevent Armando from giving up Elsa's baby for adoption, but he refuses. During the storm, Elsa's water breaks.
34	"¡Es una niña!"	16 March 2023	2.7
Gerardo asks Antonia to remain friends but she refuses and decides to put distance between the two of them. Elena receives love advice on how to keep a man happy and surprises everyone with her new attitude. Horacio returns to San Juan and explains to Aurora that he understood his mistake and would rather let her go than lose his family. Elsa gives birth to a baby girl but faints, so she is taken to the hospital; Armando takes the opportunity to get rid of the baby.
35	"Que Dios nos perdone"	17 March 2023	2.5
The doctor informs Estela that Elsa needs to be operated on immediately. Under the effects of the medication, Elsa dreams of what her life would be like if she had never been separated from Andrés. Despite his remorse, Father Reynaldo meets with the Sotomayor family to give them Eva, Elsa's daughter. Armando orders a fake funeral so that Elsa will never see her daughter again.
36	"La bebé murió"	20 March 2023	2.4
Gerardo tells Toña that he is not willing to leave her; Lamberto advises him to separate from Elena if he is not happy with her. Horacio calls Carlos to complain that he and Aurora prefer to live in Ángela's house rather than with him. Nora does not want to separate from Elsa and is not willing to stayat the ranch, so she asks Armando to take her to San Juan to make something of her life. When Elsa wakes up, Estela tells her the news of the death of her daughter, Eva.
37	"Muerte de cuna"	21 March 2023	2.7
Elsa blames Armando for Eva's death for sending her to the ranch. Elsa visits Eva's grave, father Reynaldo warns Armando that it is not too late to tell Elsa the truth, Armando assures him that if anyone finds out, he will also be guilty. Armando advises Estela to calm down so as not to be forced to hospitalize her again, she tells him to forget about the consultations with Dr. Leonidas.
38	"Te voy a amar siempre"	22 March 2023	2.5
Guillermina asks Elsa about her pregnancy, Elsa blames her for telling Armando about her pregnancy. Armando demands Guillermina that she stop her attacks against Elsa or she will know who he really is. Horacio tells Aurora that he is not willing to let her go and kisses her without realizing that Carlos has been following them. Andrés receives a visit from Elsa in prison, she reveals to him that their daughter died.
39	"Ya no puedo seguir callando"	23 March 2023	2.7
When Guillermina is stabilized, she requests Armando's presence and father Reynaldo realizes that he something had to do with the panic attack she suffered. Horacio and Elsa run into each other at the hotel and decide to have breakfast together and discuss their respective pains. Aurora wants to be friends with Elsa again, but Elsa demands her to tell the truth to free Andrés.
40	"Nunca te he amado"	24 March 2023	2.5
The lawyer informs Lamberto that the appeal she filed on Andrés' case was denied. After a few months, Aurora surprises Carlos with the news that she is pregnant. Andrés fears that his relationship with Elsa will deteriorate while he is incarcerated and breaks up with her. Horacio offers Elsa comfort and proposes marriage.
41	"¡Nos casamos!"	27 March 2023	2.5
Aurora testifies again about the incident with Andrés, but the fear of being caught lying causes her to make mistakes in her new statement. Elsa and Horacio go ahead with their plan and manage to get married in secret; surprising everyone with the news. Armando assures Elsa that she made the worst mistake of her life by choosing Horacio as her husband. Armando explains to Estela his disappointment with Elsa because Horacio's only interest is her money.
42	"¡Se hizo justicia!"	28 March 2023	2.9
The judge realizes that Aurora lied in her statement and declares that Andrés is innocent. Andrés has to decide whether to counter sue Aurora for damages. Ángela finds out that Lamberto is back and is shocked to see Silvia return with a sophisticated look. Andrés is released from jail and searches for Elsa.
43	"Tienes dos días para largarte de la casa"	29 March 2023	2.7
Andrés explains to Elsa the reasons behind their breakup and tries to win her back, but is disappointed to learn that she married Horacio. Armando confronts Gerardo for being unfaithful to Elena and tries to threaten him. Ángela visits Armando at his house to find out what is going on with him, but they are caught kissing by Sofía. Estela confronts Armando about his infidelity, confesses that she remembers everything and kicks him out of the house.
44	"Dame una oportunidad de recuperarte"	30 March 2023	2.6
Aurora runs into Andrés in the street and Carlos defends her, but learns that Andrés is innocent. Armando asks Estela for another chance. Elena finds out that her parents are getting divorced and complains to Estela. Armando warns father Reynaldo that Andrés is investigating his daughter's death and threatens him to keep quiet.
45	"No me vas a despojar de mis cosas"	31 March 2023	2.3
Aurora tries to get closer to Carlos, but he still cannot forgive her lies that imprisoned Andrés. Aurora kisses Horacio by force; Meche sees them and is upset about their betrayal. Ángela steals money from the company to pay off her debts without knowing she is being watched. Meche gives Horacio and Aurora a chance to explain things but seeing that they are only lying, she decides to tell the truth to Carlos.
46	"¡Es niña!"	3 April 2023	2.4
Horacio and Aurora convince Meche not to say anything to Carlos. Andrés asks Elsa for help to close the cycle of his daughter and asks for directions to Santa Ramona to visit Eva's grave. Aurora goes into labor. Andrés feels cursed by the misfortunes that befall his loved ones and Ingrid tries to distract him with a kiss.
47	"Te sigo queriendo"	4 April 2023	2.5
Carlos is happy about the birth of his daughter and Aurora takes advantage of it to try to reconcile, but he tells her that he stopped believing in her. Armando is angry at Ángela for stealing from him and also letting Ingrid be fired. Elsa extends her support so that Andrés can visit Eva's grave, he misinterprets her affection and kisses her. Gerardo takes Toña home and they make love, he confesses his plans to separate from Elena.
48	"Demanda de divorcio"	5 April 2023	2.5
Aurora is surprised to see Carlos packing his bags, he tells that he can no longer trust her and prefers to separate. Armando reinstates Ingrid, but forces Ángela to apologize to her. Andrés manages to find Clemencia's ranch and is received by Nora, who explains how Elsa spent her days there. Estela discusses with Héctor her decision to divorce Armando, Héctor begins to court her but Elena complains to him.
49	"No quiero vivir sin ti"	6 April 2023	2.1
Andrés asks Nora about the time Elsa lived in the ranch and her version behind his daughter's death, he realizes that everyone has the same doubts behind the story. Gerardo leaves Elena despite her pleas, she fakes an attempt to end her life. Armando blames Gerardo for Elena's attempt to take her life but Gerardo puts a stop to his threats. Andrés searches the cemetery for his daughter's grave and learns that she was never buried there and suspects that Armando is behind the mystery.
50	"Sé que eres el padre de Eva"	7 April 2023	1.8
Gerardo discovers that Elena's suicide attempt was only blackmail and confronts her. Ángela warns Toña to stay away from Gerardo, Silvia confronts her. Andrés finds Eva's grave and cannot contain his emotions. As Horacio and Elsa go out, someone tries to run them over, but Horacio saves her by putting his life at risk.
51	"Tu ciclo se acabó"	10 April 2023	2.4
Lamberto surprises Silvia with a romantic dinner in which he asks her to marry him. Irene visits Armando to let him know that his job at the company is over. Andrés says goodbye to his daughter and let her soul rest in peace. Armando realizes that Andres infiltrated Clemencia's ranch to get to Eva's grave.
52	"Tráfico de armas"	11 April 2023	2.7
Carlos proposes to Aurora to get back together for the sake of their daughter Leonor, but he has not forgiven her lies. Héctor's birthday party is interrupted by the police with a warrant to arrest Irene for her complicity in firearms trafficking. Elena takes Toña out for lunch and fills her with criticism and insults disguised as advice. Clemencia locks up Andrés when she discovers his identity but Nora helps him escape just before she decides to kill him.
53	"Se van a arrepentir de haber nacido"	12 April 2023	2.7
The police determine that Irene's arrest was nothing more than a misunderstanding and she is released. Aurora visits Horacio worried about the accident he suffered and tries to get close to him, but he tells her to keep her distance. Clemencia tries to prevent Andrés from escaping, but falls into the ravine. Armando picks up his children to take them to the fair, but suffers a heart attack at the entrance of his house.
54	"¡Tu hija está viva!"	13 April 2023	2.5
Armando manipulates Elena into believing that his illness is Irene's fault. Elena tries to kick Irene out of the house, but Estela intercedes for her sister. Despite letting Armando spend the night in the house, Estela knows that it is all one of his schemes to get back into the house. Aurora gets tired of Carlos' attempts to reunite her with Lamberto and threatens him to stop meddling in her family life. Clemencia knowing that she is on the verge of death, prefers to clear her conscience by apologizing to Nora and confesses to Andrés that his daughter's death was a hoax.
55	"¡Profanar la tumba de mi hija!"	14 April 2023	2.4
Andrés digs up his daughter's grave, confirming that she is alive. Irene realizes how little she knows about Armando and hires a private investigator to dig up his past. Andrés questions Clemencia about Eva's whereabouts, she confesses everything she and Armando did to hide her tracks but manages to guide him to Guadalajara to continue with the investigation. Armando tries to reassure Ángela by seducing her, but they are interrupted by Irene.
56	"¡Armando es tu verdadero padre!"	17 April 2023	2.6
Andrés visits the convent to find out more information that can lead him to his daughter, but the only nun who knew anything is dead. Elena visits Toña to tell her that she is expecting Gerardo's child. On her deathbed, Clemencia confesses to Nora that, besides not being her mother, she is Armando's daughter. The doctors report that Horacio's health is deteriorating rapidly despite their efforts to stop the infection.
57	"A Armando le avergüenzan sus orígenes"	18 April 2023	2.5
Gerardo assures Toña that Elena is not pregnant and only wants to separate them. Irene teases Ángela about the fate that awaits her once she takes control of the company. With Clemencia's death, Nora feels obliged to continue her work at the ranch and remain tied to Santa Ramona. The investigator contacts Irene to inform that Armando lied all his life about his origin and she is willing to blackmail him to make him return the company.
58	"Todo tiene su final"	19 April 2023	2.7
On Armando's orders, Renzo kidnaps Irene to arrange a situation with which he can blackmail her. Armando gathers the employees to announce his departure from the company. Elena picks up Toña to take her on a surprise and uncomfortable blind date with Dr. Sanchez, Gerardo's friend. Armando tries to blackmail Irene with the photos of her affair, but she throws in his face that she knows all about his past, Armando decides to kill her.
59	"¿Dónde está mi hija?"	20 April 2023	2.8
Armando does everything possible to hide his crime and throws Irene's body into a well. Armando visits Ángela to save their relationship. Seeing that two days have passed without hearing from Irene, Estela asks for Héctor's support because she is certain that something bad has happened to her. Andrés visits Armando to demand answers about his daughter's whereabouts.
60	"¿Por qué se deshizo de mi hija?"	21 April 2023	2.6
Elena visits Toña to apologize for what happened, but Toña decides to play along with her game. Andrés visits Father Reynaldo demanding answers about his daughter. Armando offers to take Estela to the ranch where Irene's investigation is being carried out. The rescuer goes into the well and Estela is informed that Irene's lifeless body has been found.
61	"¡Sospecho de Armando Quiroga!"	24 April 2023	2.8
Confirmation of Irene's death spreads quickly throughout the town. Ángela finds Armando's coat covered in blood. Estela assures Flor that Armando is behind Irene's death, Elena overhears her and confronts her for making accusations about her father. Ángela confronts Armando assuring him that the blood on his clothes belongs to Irene and uses this information to her advantage.
62	"Confirmar coartada"	25 April 2023	2.6
Commander Natalia interrogates Armando about his whereabouts the day Irene died, Ángela protects him by giving him an alibi. Gerardo goes to Irene's funeral to offer his condolences, but Elena is upset at him for filing for divorce and makes him leave. Commander Natalia deduces that given his weak alibi, Héctor may have been behind Irene's death. Natalia's husband points out to Guillermina the nature of the murder weapon and she remembers where she had seen it.
63	"¡Estás loca!"	26 April 2023	2.9
Guillermina is certain that Armando is involved in Irene's death and confronts him. Martín discovers Estela's plans to get rid of Armando and runs to tell him everything, Armando asks him to keep an eye on everything that happens in the house. Aware of what he risks if he keeps his distance from Guillermina, Armando visits her to seduce her and regain her silence.
64	"Lo que hiciste no tiene perdón de Dios"	27 April 2023	2.8
Gerardo continues to doubt that Elena is pregnant, so he asks her to take a blood test. Andrés tells Elsa everything that happened in Santa Ramona along with discovering that Eva is alive. Elsa confronts Armando for having subjected her to the pain of losing a daughter when in reality it was just one more of his manipulations. The police find evidence that points directly to Héctor as Irene's murderer.
65	"Yo no la maté"	28 April 2023	2.9
With the evidence against Héctor, Natalia arrests him while his innocence is proven. Aurora offers Horacio several options to get back together, but he puts a stop to her, arguing that he no longer loves her. Armando visits Elsa to explain that Andrés is trying to manipulate her, but she doesn't want to hear him.
66	"Va a ser trasladado al reclusorio"	1 May 2023	2.5
Nora tells Armando that she is adopted and questions him about the nature of the economic agreement he had with Clemencia. Estela bursts into Armando's office and confronts him for lying about Eva's death. Elena asks Dr. Leonidas for his support to get an ultrasound in her name and when he refuses, she resorts to blackmailing him with all the times he has pretended to have other medical specialties. Nora confesses to Guillermina that she is adopted, Guillermina realizes that Nora could be her lost daughter and questions Armando.
67	"¡Ya estás divorciada!"	2 May 2023	2.6
Armando confirms to Guillermina that Nora is his daughter, and reminds her that she gave her up voluntarily. Estela gets legally divorced from Armando. Héctor arrives at the prison, but is not well received by the inmates because everyone knows who he is. Renzo declares to Elena his interest in her and, desperate to get pregnant, she is affectionate with him. Gerardo does not believe Elena's ultrasound is real. Elena visits Toña to beg her to stay away from Gerardo for the sake of the child she is expecting.
68	"¡Yo soy tu madre!"	3 May 2023	2.2
Father Reynaldo informs Elsa and Andrés of his intention to find Eva to redeem the damage he did to them. Gerardo surprises Toña by showing her the apartment in which he wants them to live together once he manages to divorce Elena. Guillermina tells Nora how she was forced to give her up for adoption.
69	"Mi único pecado es amar a Armando"	4 May 2023	2.8
Nora is affectionate with Guillermina now that she knows she is her mother and explains why she cannot blame her for her abandonment. The police arrive with a search warrant at Guillermina's office to pressure her to cooperate in the investigation into Irene's death. Guillermina visits Commander Natalia to confess that Armando is behind Irene's death, but she cannot overcome her fear and runs away. Guillermina warns Armando that she will go to the police to tell everything, but he intercepts her to thank her for her constant support, although it is all part of a trap.
70	"¡Qué triste final, señorita Guillermina!"	5 May 2023	2.8
Armando makes sure Guillermina stops breathing and makes it look as if she orchestrated the whole thing. Father Reynaldo visits the Sotomayor family and meets Eva. Father Reynaldo sends Elsa and Andrés the photo he took of Eva and they are thrilled to see her. Martin questions Estela regarding what she heard about Armando, she has no choice but to tell him the whole truth.
71	"La señorita Guillermina se quitó la vida"	8 May 2023	2.9
Nora reveals to Elsa that Guillermina is her real mother and suffers when she learns that she apparently took her own life. Andrés informs Elsa that thanks to the efforts of Father Reynaldo, the Sotomayor family agreed to let them meet Eva. Elena sees Gerardo and Toña in the street and makes a scene to point out Toña as a tramp. Ángela points out to Armando that he looks nervous and he assures that the cause is Guillermina's death.
72	"Lo bonita que es"	9 May 2023	3.0
Horacio confesses to Meche that he is jealous just thinking that Elsa and Andrés traveled together to meet Eva. Elsa and Andres meet the Sotomayor family and are moved to tears when they see their daughter for the first time. Elena gets drunk before her date so she can hide her repulsion for Renzo. Meche and Bruno clean Guillermina's office where they find a letter she wrote before she died and in which she blames Armando for Irene's death.
73	"La policía me trae en la mira"	10 May 2023	2.4
Commander Natalia doubts that Guillermina's confession is real, but realizes that everything would make sense if it were proven true. Armando is afraid of being caught and assures that Guillermina's letter does not exist and that Commander Natalia only fabricates evidence that will free Héctor of any guilt. The lawyer explains that although Armando could not be blamed simply by Guillermina's confession, it could get Héctor out of prison. Gerardo asks Silvia for permission to live with Toña, but she refuses until his divorce is finalized.
74	"Abuso de autoridad"	11 May 2023	3.0
Armando offers Rocío a sum of money in exchange for changing her statement and freeing him of any suspicion. Fabián offers Aurora to take some photos of her and send them to a modeling agency. Gerardo shows Toña the results of her tests, she is surprised to discover that she is pregnant. Renzo cannot forget the night he lived with Elena and threatens her to repeat it or he will tell the whole town what happened.
75	"Liberaron al presidente municipal"	12 May 2023	2.8
Elena shares with Ángela the news of her pregnancy and Toña's simultaneous pregnancy and asks for her help so that she won't be humiliated the day everyone discovers that Gerardo has two children by different mothers. Ángela complains to Gerardo for having impregnated Toña and upon seeing her hiding in the closet, she unmasks him as her accomplice in the death of Commander Fuentes. When it is confirmed that the letter was written by Guillermina, Commander Natalia is forced to release Héctor. The news of Hector's release worries Armando as he is the only suspect left.
76	"Tiene derecho a guardar silencio"	15 May 2023	3.5
Jaime must flee because of problems in one of his businesses and manipulates Verónica into believing that it is all about preventing Andrés and Elsa from taking Eva away from them. Héctor confronts Armando for incriminating him in Irene's death and warns that the police are on his trail. Commander Natalia gets the arrest warrant against Armando, Ángela tries to save him but is threaten with being arrested for complicity. Elsa and Andrés arrive at the Sotomayor's house, but learn that they packed everything to never return.
77	"¡Estoy maldita!"	16 May 2023	3.1
Angela gives Armando money to protect himself, he uses it to move to a better cell. Gerardo asks Toña to understand what he did to defend his mother, he gives her a wedding ring as a promise to get married once he finishes his divorce. Andrés finds an explanation for the Sotomayor's escape in which they are involved in illicit business, putting Eva at risk. Armando's lawyer advises him to look for an innocent person who for money is willing to confess to Irene's death.
78	"Desde hoy me haré cargo de mi empresa"	17 May 2023	3.1
Flor tells Estela all about Elena's pregnancy and asks her to take charge since she doesn't know if it's another one of her lies. Horacio complains to Elsa about not having taken a moment to check in, she explains what happened. Estela advises Nora to find out who her father is while she is in San Juan and fearing her reaction, Nora confesses to her that it is Armando. Estela tells the employees that she will take over the company, Ángela complains but ends up being humiliated.
79	"Voy a hacer de tu vida un infierno"	18 May 2023	2.8
Estela decides to eliminate Ángela's position and offers her a job as a seamstress. Renzo visits Elena, causing Estela to suspect that her daughter is dating him. Feeling humiliated, Ángela tries to blackmail Lamberto in exchange for helping her return to her old position. With Ingrid missing, everyone at the factory fears that the wave of tragedies that hit San Juan will continue.
80	"Está usted libre"	19 May 2023	2.9
Elena's plan to stay with Gerardo with her pregnancy does not work. Everything goes according to Armando's plan and Ingrid's attacker confesses his guilt for Irene's death. Tired of Elena's attacks on Toña, Gerardo proposes the option of moving somewhere else to be happy. Armando's is absolved of the crimes he committed.
81	"Todas terminan de prostitutas"	22 May 2023	2.8
Armando complains to Lamberto for taking his place in the company but Lamberto does not intend to leave the management unless it is a direct order from Estela. Aurora follows Fabián's instructions without suspecting that it is a trap to lock her in a brothel where she will be forced to work under threat. Carlos comments to Meche his concern that Aurora is not answering his calls. Héctor decides to take his relationship with Estela to something more than friendship, she accepts.
82	"Todo regresa a su lugar"	23 May 2023	3.1
Armando shows Estela the papers he made her sign during her stay at the mental clinic and gives her 24 hours to leave his office. Natalia finds Meche and Bruno walking around and is shocked and remorseful for having ended things with him. Fabián introduces Aurora, now Esmeralda, to her first client but she feels ill again and Fabian threatens her to resolve her illness as soon as possible. Natalia visits Bruno to beg for one more chance to talk about their marriage and he accepts. Natalia warns Meche that she will soon get back together with Bruno.
83	"Aurora se fue con ese hombre"	24 May 2023	2.6
Elena argues with Estela when she invites Héctor to dinner, Estela gets tired of her insolence and demands that she respects her or she can leave the house. Bruno rejects the possibility of getting back together with Natalia and she blames Meche for meddling. Horacio asks Elsa to consider having a child together. Aurora manages to enter Fabián's office to make a call home and Meche answers but instead of listening to her, she complains about her abandonment.
84	"Guerra vas a tener"	25 May 2023	2.6
Lamberto becomes suspicious about Aurora's disappearance and her agreement with Fabián and goes to the police to get help finding her. Natalia gives Lamberto the last location of Aurora's cell phone. Elena desperately asks for Armando's help to prevent Gerardo from leaving her and he confesses to her that he is involved in a crime.
85	"¡Tienen a mi hija retenida!"	26 May 2023	2.9
Renzo intercepts Elena as she leaves Armando's office and asks her for another night together, Ángela sees them and becomes suspicious. Lamberto enters the brothel under another name and is disappointed to see Aurora working there, she explains to him what is really going on. Lamberto and Aurora make a plan to free her from the extortionists. Elena warns Gerardo that if he does not get back together with her, she will be forced to report him for his complicity in Fuentes' death.
86	"Papá, ¡me salvaste!"	29 May 2023	2.8
Verónica confronts Jaime to tell her why she is forbidden to go out, he confesses to being involved in illicit business from which he has to flee. At the factory, Estela overhears Renzo talking to Elena about a night of passion and questions her about it, Elena denies everything. Gerardo comments with Toña about Elena's blackmail, she decides to end things with him and raise her son alone as long as she does not see him behind bars. Aurora escapes the brothel and files a complaint against Fabián for his threats and illegal business.
87	"Soy cómplice de asesinato"	30 May 2023	2.8
Armando assures Estela that he has bought the shares that Irene inherited from her husband and that he is now the sole owner of the company. Angela mocks Estela's misfortune. Back at home, Aurora regrets the way she treated everyone around her and looks for Meche to explain what happened with Fabián. Meche apologizes to Aurora for not listening to her. Elena finds out that Gerardo decided to turn himself in to the police for being an accomplice in the death of Commander Fuentes.
88	"Un sacrificio de amor"	31 May 2023	3.0
Carlos comes clean with Aurora about their relationship, they come to the conclusion that they no longer love each other and he proposes an amicable separation. Thanks to Gerardo's statement, an arrest warrant is issued for Ángela. Elena imagines that Gerardo fled with Toña and when she finds her, she attacks her, but Toña says that he preferred to go to jail rather than spend more time with her. The police find the address where the Sotomayor family is hiding, but when they arrive they find Verónica injured and Eva unattended.
89	"Acabas de firmar tu sentencia"	1 June 2023	2.9
Ángela accuses her cellmate for taking both beds in the cell, earning her scorn and threats against her. Elena can't get over the fact that Toña has won Gerardo's love and decides to run her over to get her husband back. Armando tells Ángela that he will not find her a lawyer knowing that it is a hopeless case, she decides to talk about all his crimes. Horacio tells Elsa that he is leaving her so she can be happy and start a family with Andrés.
90	"No puedes escapar de tu destino"	2 June 2023	3.1
Elena is arrested for running over Toña, but she believes she is still living happily with Gerardo. Renzo warns Armando that the police are looking for him with an arrest warrant, Armando decides to flee. Elsa informs Andrés that she has received the divorce decree from Horacio, and without hesitation Andrés proposes to her. Toña gives birth to a baby girl and takes her to Gerardo in jail so he can meet her. While trying to flee from the police, Armando hallucinates his victims and faints from the disturbance. Elena is sent to the psychiatric ward. Armando is arrested by the police and sentenced to 70 years in prison for killing Detective Olmos and Irene. Andrés and Elsa get married and their family and friends celebrate that they will finally be happy together.

== Reception ==
=== Ratings ===
Viewership and ratings per season of Perdona nuestros pecados
Season	Timeslot (CT)	Episodes	First aired		Last aired		Avg. viewers (millions)
Season	Timeslot (CT)	Episodes	Date	Viewers (millions)	Date	Viewers (millions)	Avg. viewers (millions)
1	Mon–Fri 6:30 p.m.	88	30 January 2023	2.6	2 June 2023	3.1	2.73

=== Awards and nominations ===
Year	Award	Category	Nominated	Result	Ref
2023	Produ Awards	Best Short Telenovela	Perdona nuestros pecados	Nominated	
2023	Produ Awards	Best Supporting Actress - Superseries or Telenovela	Fernanda Urdapilleta	Nominated	
2024	Premios Juventud	My Favorite Actor	Emmanuel Palomares	Nominated	
