= Kelly Bishop =

American actress and dancer (born 1944)

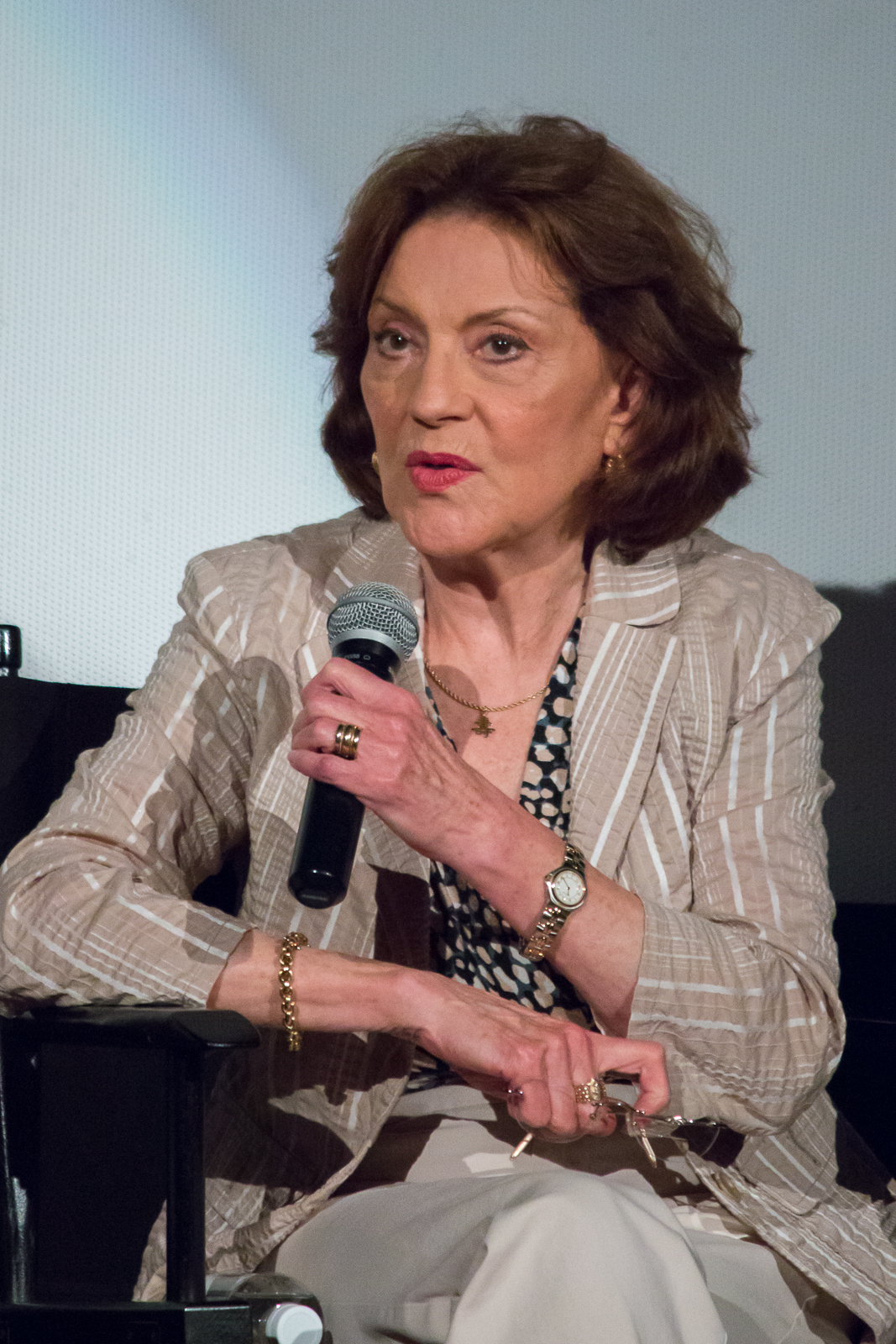
- Bishop at the ATX TV Festival 2015 for the TV show Gilmore Girls
- Born: February 28, 1944 (age 82); Colorado Springs, Colorado, U.S.
- Occupations: Actress, dancer
- Years active: 1962–present
- Spouses: Peter Miller (m. 1970; div. 1975) Lee Leonard (m. 1981; died 2018)

Kelly Bishop (born Carole Jane Bishop; on February 28, 1944) is an American actress and dancer, best known for her roles as matriarch Emily Gilmore on the series Gilmore Girls and as Marjorie Houseman, the mother of Jennifer Grey's Frances "Baby" Houseman, in the film Dirty Dancing. Bishop originated the role of Sheila in A Chorus Line for which she won a Tony Award for Best Performance by a Featured Actress in a Musical. In 2023, she starred as Mrs. Ivey in The Watchful Eye (2023).

== Early life ==
Bishop was born on February 28, 1944, in Colorado Springs, Colorado. She grew up in Denver, Colorado, where she trained to be a ballet dancer, and as a teenager, moved to California attending the San Jose Ballet School. At 18, she headed to New York City and landed her first job dancing in a year-round ballet company at Radio City Music Hall. Bishop continued to dance in Las Vegas, summer stock, and on television until she was cast in 1967 in Golden Rainbow, her first Broadway role.

== Career ==
Bishop moved to New York City to try to become a ballet dancer. Bishop's big break came when she was cast as the sexy, hard-edged Sheila in the 1975 Broadway production of A Chorus Line, for which she won the 1976 Tony Award as "Best Supporting or Featured Actress (Musical)" as well as the 1976 Drama Desk Award for "Outstanding Actress in a Musical". Many details of the character Sheila's past were drawn from Bishop's real life, as she helped develop the character during early workshops. She was also cast in Broadway productions of Six Degrees of Separation, Neil Simon's Proposals, the Tony Award-winning The Last Night of Ballyhoo, and Bus Stop.

In film, she was cast opposite Jill Clayburgh in Paul Mazursky's big-screen drama An Unmarried Woman (1978). In the 1987 film Dirty Dancing, she was originally set for a small role, but took on the much bigger role of Mrs. Houseman when Lynne Lipton (originally cast to play the role) fell ill during the first week of shooting.

Bishop went on to play mothers to high-profile stars in features: Howard Stern's in the Betty Thomas-directed comedy Private Parts (1997), and Tobey Maguire's in Wonder Boys (2000). Additional feature credits include Ich und Er (USA: Me and Him, 1988), Queens Logic (1991), Cafe Society (1995), Miami Rhapsody (1995) and Blue Moon (2000).

Bishop debuted on television in Hawaii Five-O. She starred in the Mike Nichols series The Thorns in 1988. She played Lisa Ann Walter's mother on My Wildest Dreams in 1995. She guest-starred on, among other series, Kate & Allie, Murphy Brown, Law & Order, and Law & Order: Special Victims Unit.

From 2000 to 2007, Bishop starred in The WB/CW series Gilmore Girls as wealthy New England matriarch Emily Gilmore. Both she and fellow series regular Edward Herrmann were Tony Award recipients in 1976. She reprised her role in the 2016 miniseries Gilmore Girls: A Year in the Life on Netflix. She would later reunite with Amy Sherman-Palladino, who created Gilmore Girls, on Bunheads, which aired from 2012 to 2013 and was canceled after the first season. Bishop has since appeared in television shows including Army Wives, Mercy, The Good Wife, and played Benedetta in the Golden Globe-winning series The Marvelous Mrs. Maisel, where she was again reunited with Sherman-Palladino. Bishop starred in the TV drama series The Watchful Eye (which premiered on January 30, 2023) as Mrs. Ivey.

Following the end of Gilmore Girls, Bishop returned to theater, performing in Becky Shaw at the Second Stage Theatre in 2008 and as Evangeline Harcourt in the 2011 revival of Anything Goes alongside Sutton Foster and Joel Grey, as well as appearing in the 2011 movie Friends with Kids.

In 2024, Bishop wrote a debut novel called Broad Appeal, with Ali Rosen and William Morrow.

== Personal life ==
Bishop resides in South Orange, New Jersey. She was first married to stagehand and electrician Peter Miller in 1970 before divorcing in 1975. She was married to the TV talk show host Lee Leonard until his death in 2018.

Bishop grew up on a farm.

== Credits ==
=== Film ===
Year	Title	Role	Notes
1966	Step Out of Your Mind	Missy Linden	
1978	An Unmarried Woman	Elaine Liebowitz	
1982	O'Hara's Wife	Beth Douglas	
1986	Solarbabies	Tutor Nover	
1987	Dirty Dancing	Marjorie Houseman	
1988	Me and Him	Eleanor Aramis	
1991	Queens Logic	Maria	
1993	Six Degrees of Separation	Adele	
1995	Miami Rhapsody	Zelda	
1995	Cafe Society	Mrs. Jelke	
1997	Private Parts	Ray Stern	
1999	My X-Girlfriend's Wedding Reception	Sylvia Wienstein	
2000	Blue Moon	Peggy's Mother	
2000	Wonder Boys	Amanda Leer	
2011	Friends with Kids	Marcy Fryman	
2011	A Novel Romance	Lily Sparks	
2014	Saint Janet	Janet Turner	
2018	The Salzburg Story	The Lady	

=== Television ===
Year	Title	Role	Notes
1976	Hawaii Five-0	Char	Episode: "Oldest Profession - Latest Price"
1981	Advice to the Lovelorn	Rita Borden	TV film
1982	Hart to Hart	Laura	Episode: "Hart of Diamonds"
1983	The New Odd Couple	Charity	Episode: "Murray's Hot Date"
1984	Kate & Allie	Paulette	Episode: "Baby"
1985	The Recovery Room	Kaye Brenner	TV film
1987	As the World Turns	Grace Wescott Andrews	Recurring role, summer 1987
1988	The Thorns	Ginger Thorn	Main role
1989, 1996	One Life to Live	Serena Wyman	1 episode
1989, 1996	One Life to Live	Dr. Robbins	1 episode
1990	The Baby-Sitters Club	Flora	Episode: "Claudia and the Secret Passage"
1991	Ruth Harper	Jane Birk	Episode: "Pilot"
1992	ABC Afterschool Special	Roxanne Holden	Episode: "Summer Stories: The Mall - Part 1"
1992	Law & Order	Marian Borland	Episode: "Intolerance"
1992	Murphy Brown	Connie Silverberg	Episode: "Me Thinks My Parents Doth Protest Too Much"
1992, 1995	All My Children	Freida Landau	2 episodes
1995	My Wildest Dreams	Gloria James	Recurring role (5 episodes)
2000, 2008–2009	Law & Order: Special Victims Unit	Registrar	Episode: "Slaves"
2000, 2008–2009	Law & Order: Special Victims Unit	Julia Zimmer	Episodes: "Persona" and "Zebras"
2000–2007	Gilmore Girls	Emily Gilmore	Main role
2009	Army Wives	Jean Calhoun	Episode: "Operation: Tango"
2010	Mercy	Lauren Kempton	4 episodes
2010	The Good Wife	Mrs. Kent	Episode: "VIP Treatment" (voice)
2010	The Good Wife	Bea Wilson	2 episodes
2012–2013	Bunheads	Fanny Flowers	Main role
2014	Dangerous Liaisons	Lucille Julien	TV film
2015	Sex & Drugs & Rock & Roll	Elizabeth	Episode: "Supercalifragilisticjuliefriggingandrews"
2015	Flesh and Bone	Mrs. Hawthorn	Episode: "F.U.B.A.R."
2016	Gilmore Girls: A Year in the Life	Emily Gilmore	Main role (4 episodes)
2019	Art of Falling in Love	Iris	TV film
2021	Halston	Eleanor Lambert	Episode: "Versailles"
2022–2023	The Marvelous Mrs. Maisel	Benedetta	3 episodes
2023	The Watchful Eye	Mrs. Ivey	Main role
2024	Shrinking	Susan	Episode: "Honesty Era"
2025	Étoile	Clara McMillan	3 episodes

=== Theater ===
Year	Show	Role	Notes
1968	Golden Rainbow	Cat-Girl/Dancer	Shubert Theatre
1968	Promises, Promises	Clancy's Lounge Patron/Company Nurse	Shubert Theatre
1968	Precious Sons	Bea (standby)	
1971	On the Town	Dance Ensemble	Imperial Theatre
1975	A Chorus Line	Sheila	Shubert Theatre; Originated role Tony Award for Best Featured Actress in a Musical; Drama Desk Award for Outstanding Actress in a Musical
1990	Six Degrees of Separation	Kitty/Louisa "Ouisa" Kittredge	Vivian Beaumont Theater; Replacement
1996	Bus Stop	Grace Hoylard	Short revival, 29 performances
1997	The Last Night of Ballyhoo	Boo Levy	Helen Hayes Theatre; Replacement
1997	Proposals	Annie Robbins	Broadhurst Theatre
2011	Anything Goes	Mrs. Evangeline Harcourt	Stephen Sondheim Theatre; August 9, 2011 - January 15, 2012

== Awards and nominations ==
Year	Award	Category	Work	Result	Ref.
1976	Tony Award	Best Featured Actress in a Musical	A Chorus Line	Won	
1976	Drama Desk Award	Outstanding Actress in a Musical	A Chorus Line	Won	
