= Mo Gaffney =

American actress, comedian and activist (born 1958)

- Born: Maureen E. Gaffney; November 5, 1958 (age 67); San Diego, California, United States
- Occupations: Actress; activist
- Years active: 1990–present
- Website: www.mogaffney.com

Maureen E. Gaffney (born November 5, 1958, in San Diego, California) is an American actress and activist.

== Career ==
Gaffney hosted two of her own television talk shows: Women Aloud! (which was shown on the Comedy Central network) and The Mo Show.

She and friend Kathy Najimy wrote and starred in two Off-Broadway shows, The Kathy and Mo Show: Parallel Lives (1989) and The Kathy and Mo Show: The Dark Side, both of which won Obie Awards.

She appeared in Seasons 4 and 5 of That '70s Show as Joanne Stupak, Bob Pinciotti's girlfriend, had a recurring role in Mad About You and guest starred in Friends and Veronica's Closet. In addition, she appeared in the black comedy about beauty pageants, Drop Dead Gorgeous.

Gaffney appeared on the British television talk show The Full Wax starring Ruby Wax, in which she portrayed American correspondent "Taffy Turner", in the recurring segment "Taffy Turner: Inside America". Gaffney teamed up with Jennifer Saunders in a recurring role as Bo in the sitcom Absolutely Fabulous; in 2004, talks of a spin-off show began but nothing surfaced. She is co-host of the "Women Aloud" radio program on Greenstone Media.

== Personal life ==
Gaffney is an activist for same-sex marriage and has officiated at same-sex marriages as a certified marriage celebrant.

== Filmography ==
=== Film ===
Year	Title	Role
1990	State of Grace	Maureen
1991	Other People's Money	Harriet
1994	Days Like This	Margo
1996	Bogus	Travellers Aide – New Jersey
1998	Inconceivable	Rachel
1999	Happy, Texas	Mrs. Bromley
1999	My X-Girlfriend's Wedding Reception	Sybil Radzinsky
1999	The Out-of-Towners	Paranoid Woman
1999	Drop Dead Gorgeous	Terry Macy, State Pageant
1999	The Basement and the Kitchen	
2000	Jailbait	Lydia Stone
2001	Ca$hino	Kimmy Delance
2004	Adventures to Homeschool	Gloria Hemple
2010	Head Over Spurs in Love	Innana
2016	Absolutely Fabulous: The Movie	Bo Chrysalis Turtle
2018	Dog Days	Mayor Velez
2019	3 Days with Dad	Diane
2020	Desperados	Principal Judy
2026	Gail Daughtry and the Celebrity Sex Pass	Wilma Saint Monamogafney

=== Television ===
Year	Title	Role	Notes
1991	The Kathy & Mo Show: Parallel Lives	Herself	
1991	The Full Wax	Taffy Turner	
1992–1996, 2001–2004, 2012	Absolutely Fabulous	Bo Chrysalis Turtle	11 episodes
1993	The Mo Show	Herself	
1994	The 5 Mrs. Buchanans	Christina Todd	
1995	The Kathy & Mo Show: The Dark Side	Herself	
1996	The Show	Sheila Ricks	
1996	The Louie Show	Louie's Supervisor	
1996	Roseanne	Astrid Wentworth	2 episodes
1996–1999, 2019	Mad About You	Dr. Sheila Kleinman	16 episodes
1997	The Naked Truth	Fern, the Cat Lady	
1997	Veronica's Closet	Karen	2 episodes
1997–1999	Tracey Takes On...	Dusty Roads	7 episodes
1998	Absolutely Fabulous: Absolutely Not!	Bo Chrysalis Turtle	Video of outtakes and deleted scenes
1999–2000	Ladies Man	Mayvis Little	2 episodes
2000	Two Guys, a Girl and a Pizza Place	Dr. Brice	
2000	Normal, Ohio	Elizabeth	7 episodes
2001	Friends	The Casting Director	
2001–2003	That '70s Show	Joanne Stupac	12 episodes
2002	Judging Amy	Maxine's Dentist	
2002–2003	8 Simple Rules	Mrs. Connelly	2 episodes
2003–2004	Run of the House	Marilyn Norris	18 episodes
2004	Adventures in Homeschooling	Gloria Hemple	
2004	Without a Trace	Joanna	
2005	Ghost Whisperer	Laie Fairfax	
2007	State of Mind	Kay	
2011	Shameless	Christine Dowling	
2012–2013	House of Lies	Principal Gita	
2013	Mike & Molly	Helen	
2013	NCIS	DCS Director	Season 11, Episode 7
2014	Melissa and Joey	Vice Principal Lucinda Dowell	
2015	Brooklyn Nine-Nine	Dr. Sussman	
2015	Veep	Deborah	
2016	2 Broke Girls	Elaine	
2016	Heartbeat	Lawyer	
2016	Adam Ruins Everything	Patty	
2017	The Mick	Rita	
2018	Heathers	Margie Kane	
2019	The Good Doctor	Uber Driver	Season 2, Episode 14
2019	Fresh Off the Boat	Professor	
2022	Single Drunk Female	Val	
2023	The Conners	Tyler's Mom	Season 5, Episode 20
2023	Clone High	Ms. Grumbles	Voice
2026	Life, Larry and the Pursuit of Unhappiness	Mabel	

=== Writer ===
- 1995: The Kathy & Mo Show: The Dark Side (TV) (writer)
- 1994: She TV (1 episode, 1994) – Episode #1.2 (1994) TV episode (head writer)
- 1991: The Kathy & Mo Show: Parallel Lives (TV) (writer)

=== Producer ===
- 1994: Days Like This (TV) (executive producer)
- 1992: Women Aloud! TV series (co-producer) (unknown episodes)
