= Oka Giner =

Mexican actress (b. 1992)

Okairy Giner
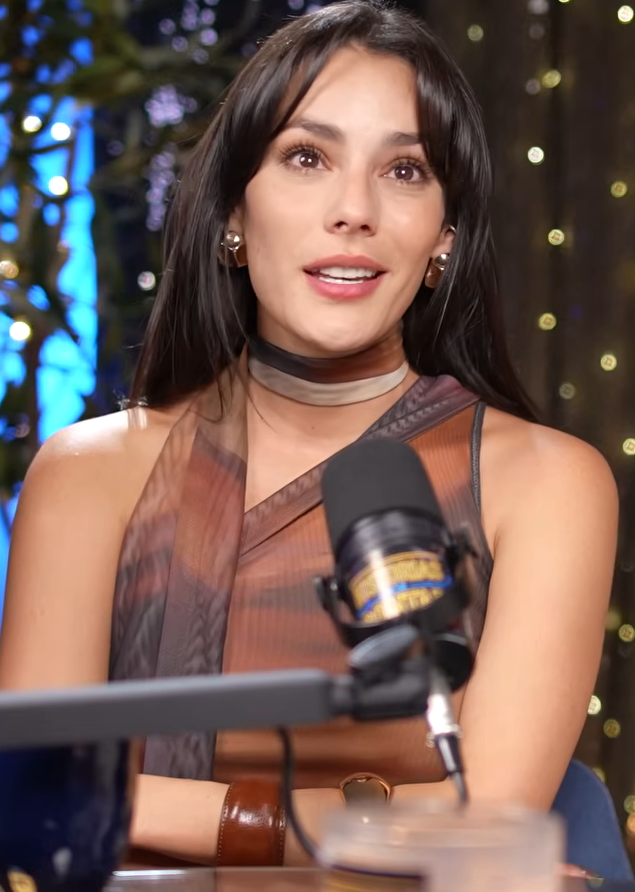
- Giner in 2025
- Born: Okairy Alejandra Giner Arredondo; November 30, 1992 (age 33); Camargo, Chihuahua, Mexico
- Other name: Oka Giner
- Occupation: Actress
- Years active: 2013–present
- Spouse: Nacho Redondo (m. 2022)

Okairy Alejandra Giner Arredondo (born November 30, 1992), known professionally as Oka Giner, is a Mexican actress who gained popularity for her debut role as Bárbara Fuenmayor in the 2013 Mexican television series, Gossip Girl: Acapulco. Giner has also starred on the telenovelas Bajo el mismo cielo, Señora Acero: La Coyote, Corazón guerrero and Perdona nuestros pecados.

== Early life ==
Giner was born in Camargo, Chihuahua. As a child, she participated in beauty pageants. When she was 17 years old, she modeled locally, appearing in photo shoot for the online newspaper El Diario de Chihuahua in 2010. She also studied Polynesian dances such as Hawaiian and Tahitian for 11 years. Giner showed an interest in performing from an early age, directing and acting in plays with her cousins during family gatherings. Later, she enrolled at Autonomous University of Chihuahua, where she majored in communication sciences.

== Acting career ==
Giner studied briefly at university, but soon left and successfully auditioned for the Centro de Educación Artística, the free drama school run by Televisa. In January 2012, she moved from Camargo to Mexico City to attend school. While attending CEA, Giner gained acting experience by performing various in student-run productions. During her first year at CEA, she heard about an audition for producer Pedro Torres' latest project, Gossip Girl: Acapulco, a Spanish-language remake of the hit American series. Actress Mariana Van Rankin was originally cast as Bárbara Fuenmayor and filmed a short pilot episode. When she later dropped out, producers recast the role. Giner originally attended the casting call hoping to gain experience for future auditions. Although she had little professional training and no professional acting experience, she was cast in one of two lead roles. Giner was the last actor to audition and be cast in the series. The entire cast was officially announced in January 2013. Gossip Girl: Acapulco began filming in various locations in Acapulco, Mexico on January 21, 2013 and ended in May of that year. The show premiered exclusively on the subscription service channel, Golden Premier, on August 5, 2013. In spite of the show's success in Mexico, it was not renewed for a second season and was officially cancelled on January 14, 2014.

Following the completion of filming and promotion for Gossip Girl: Acapulco, Giner returned to CEA to begin her second year of school in July 2013. In March 2014, she auditioned for a lead role in the Televisa telenovela, Hasta el fin del mundo, but did not receive a part. She was instead cast in a recurring role in another series, Señorita Pólvora, in July 2014.

In September 2013, she was announced as a new celebrity spokesmodel for "Always Platinum", appearing in commercials for the brand in Mexico. Her short film, M de iMportante, was released on her official Twitter account via Vimeo in July 2014.

Giner then appeared in the Telemundo telenovela Bajo el mismo cielo which premiered on July 28, 2015. The first episode garnered one of the highest-rated telenovela on Telemundo in three years. On August 8, 2015, she began filming another Telemundo telenovela ¿Quién es quién?, moving to Miami for the show's production. The telenovela premiered on October 26, 2015 on Gala TV in Mexico.

== Personal life ==
On December 10, 2022, Giner married Venezuelan comedian Nacho Redondo after three years of dating.

== Filmography ==
=== Films ===
Year	Title	Role	Notes
2014	M de iMportante	Alejandra	Short film
2015	Hagamos un corto	Oka	Short film. writer/producer/director
2020	Escuela de Nada Salva La Navidad	Novia	

=== Television ===
Year	Title	Role	Notes
2013	Gossip Girl: Acapulco	Bárbara Fuenmayor	Lead role; 26 episodes
2015	Señorita Pólvora	Emilia Marín	Recurring role; 55 episodes
2015–2016	Bajo el mismo cielo	Susana "Susy" Sanders	Supporting role
2015–2016	¿Quién es quién?	Yesenia Pérez	Supporting role
2016–2018	Señora Acero	Rosario Franco	Main role (seasons 3–4); 266 episodes
2018	La Piloto	Olivia Nieves	Main role (season 2)
2019	Cita a ciegas	Marina Salazar Fuentes	Main role
2021–2022	Madre sólo hay dos	Elena	Main role
2021	La venganza de las Juanas	Juana Caridad	Main role
2022	Corazón guerrero	Doménica Ruiz-Montalvo	Main role
2022	Donde hubo fuego	Leonara Robledo	Main role
2023	Perdona nuestros pecados	Elsa Quiroga	Lead role
2024	Marea de pasiones	Luisa	Lead role
2024	Las hijas de la señora García	Valeria García	Main role
2025	¿Quién es la máscara?	Hieny Fer	Contestant (season 7)
2026	Tan cerca de ti, nace el amor	Verónica Arellano / Consuelo	Lead role
2026	Una familia complicada	Layla Navarro	Main cast

=== Music video appearances ===
Year	Artist (s)	Song
2011	Francisco Rey	"Si tú te vas"
2013	Paty Cantú	"Dicen por ahí"
2013	Carla Mauri	"Tengo que olvidarme de ti"
2015	Diego Amozurrutia	"Cada noche"

== Awards and nominations ==
Year	Award	Category	Nominated work	Result
2016	Premios Tu Mundo	Revelation of the Year	Bajo el mismo cielo	Nominated
