= Reign season 1 =

Reign
- Season 1
- Season 1 DVD Cover
- Starring: Adelaide Kane; Toby Regbo; Megan Follows; Torrance Coombs; Jenessa Grant; Celina Sinden; Caitlin Stasey; Anna Popplewell; Alan Van Sprang
- No. of episodes: 22

Release
- Original network: The CW
- Original release: October 17, 2013 – May 15, 2014

Season chronology
- Next → Season 2

The first season of Reign, an American historical romantic drama television series, consists of 22 episodes that aired on The CW between October 17, 2013, and May 15, 2014. The series follows the early exploits of Mary, Queen of Scots, and was created by Stephanie SenGupta and Laurie McCarthy.

== Cast and characters ==
=== Main ===
- Adelaide Kane as Mary, Queen of Scots
- Toby Regbo as Francis II of France
- Megan Follows as Catherine de' Medici
- Torrance Coombs as Sebastian "Bash" de Poitiers
- Jenessa Grant as Lady Aylee
- Celina Sinden as Lady Greer
- Caitlin Stasey as Lady Kenna
- Anna Popplewell as Lady Lola
- Alan van Sprang as King Henry II of France

=== Recurring ===
- Rossif Sutherland as Nostradamus
- Jonathan Keltz as Leith Bayard
- Amy Brenneman as Marie de Guise
- Michael Therriault as Aloysius Castleroy
- Anna Walton as Diane de Poitiers
- Gil Darnell as Christian, Duke of Guise
- Yael Grobglas as Olivia D'Amencourt
- Kathryn Prescott as Penelope
- Giacomo Gianniotti as "Lord Julien"/Remy
- Luke Roberts as Simon Westbrook

=== Guest ===
- Manolo Cardona as Prince Tomas of Portugal, bastard son of John III of Portugal
- Michael Aronov as Count Vincent of Italy
- Ted Atherton as Lord Hugo
- Daniel Fathers as Alec
- Greg Bryk as Richard Delacroix
- Jonathan Higgins as Archduke Ferdinand of Bohemia
- Hannah Anderson as Rowan
- Kristian Hodko as Carrick
- Andrew Airlie as Lord MacKenzie
- Joe Doyle as James Stewart, Earl of Moray
- Tahmoh Penikett as Johnathon "John"
- Shauna MacDonald as Hortenza
- Lucius Hoyos as Pascal
- Sarah Winter as Yvette Castleroy

== Episodes ==
| No. overall | No. in season | Title | Directed by | Written by | Original release date | US viewers (millions) |
|---|---|---|---|---|---|---|
| 1 | 1 | "Pilot" | Brad Silberling | Laurie McCarthy & Stephanie Sengupta | October 17, 2013 | 1.98 |
In 1557, fifteen-year-old Queen Mary Stuart of Scotland has been living in a convent in France since the age of nine in anticipation of her marriage to Prince Francis, heir to the throne of France. After a failed attempt to poison her, Mary is brought to French court for safety, where she is reunited with her Scottish handmaidens and childhood companions Greer, Kenna, Lola and Aylee. Queen Mary discovers that her marriage isn't assured, due to ever-changing politics and Francis's doubts over the wisdom of a Scottish alliance. Queen Mary also catches the eye of Prince Francis's older half-brother Bash, illegitimate son of King Henry with his mistress, Duchess Diane de Poitiers. When Queen Catherine's adviser, Nostradamus (Rossif Sutherland), has a vision that Francis's impending marriage will cost him his life, she arranges for Queen Mary to be drugged and raped by Colin (Ashley Charles), a Scot betrothed to Lola. Queen Mary is warned ahead of time by an unknown figure to not drink the drugged wine, and so manages to stop Colin. Before she can question him, Colin is executed by order of the King and Queen.
| 2 | 2 | "Snakes in the Garden" | Matt Hastings | Laurie McCarthy | October 24, 2013 | 1.83 |
Prince Francis's younger brother, Prince Charles (Peter DaCunha), is to be betrothed to Madeleine (Vanessa Carter), a French noblewoman. Madeleine arrives by ship, escorted by an unexpected English envoy led by Simon Westbrook (Luke Roberts), who are welcomed at court for helping Madeleine arrive safely. Mary learns from Charles that a girl named Clarissa (Katie Boland) lives in the secret passageways of the castle; Mary suspects she's the one who warned her of the rape plot. When Queen Mary avoids what appears to be another poisoning attempt, she asks Clarissa for information. She is led to Simon, learning that he feigned the poisoning to scare her out of the alliance with France. Simon points out that Queen Mary already has enemies in French court and will not be safe, but Mary declares her intent to stay and stand against the English. Queen Mary suspects Catherine as responsible for the various plots and shares this with Francis, who believes her and warns his mother to leave his fiancee alone. Queen Mary and Prince Francis are for now determined to be a united front against their mutual enemies.
| 3 | 3 | "Kissed" | Holly Dale | Doris Egan | October 31, 2013 | 1.57 |
When news arrives that English soldiers are amassing near the Scottish border, Queen Mary asks King Henry for military aid but is refused. She tries to negotiate a deal for troops with the visiting Prince Tomas (Manolo Cardona) of Portugal. Tomas proposes to Mary, promising military aid and an immediate wedding, which Francis cannot give her. Queen Mary tells Prince Francis of Prince Tomas's proposal, which prompts Prince Francis to blackmail King Henry, threatening to tell Queen Catherine and Lady Diane of his new affair with Kenna. King Henry is pleased by Francis's initiative and agrees to send six companies of troops to Scotland. Bash rides out to deliver the orders to the troops but returns gravely wounded; someone warned the English, who ambushed the French troops before they could set sail. A distraught Francis kisses Mary for the first time and tells her to marry Prince Tomas for the sake of Scotland. Queen Mary accepts the Prince's proposal, and he sends a ship of his men immediately to Scotland.
| 4 | 4 | "Hearts and Minds" | Scott Peters | P. K. Simonds | November 7, 2013 | 1.64 |
Simon Westbrook is arrested for causing the deaths of the French troops, based on the testimony of a prostitute who claims she saw him bragging about it. Prince Tomas shows his true colours to Queen Mary by threatening her and hitting a whipping boy when she talks back to him. After receiving a hint from Clarissa, Queen Mary, Prince Francis and Bash realize that Prince Tomas had the most to gain by warning the English. She questions the prostitute, who admits she was paid for her testimony. Prince Francis and Bash find Prince Tomas when he's about to kill his whipping boy to cover his tracks in the plot; a fight ensues and Prince Francis kills Prince Tomas. Queen Mary, Prince Francis, and Bash return to court in time to prevent Simon's execution. Henry and Catherine, with the King of Portugal's agreement, agree to cover up Tomas's treachery - the official story is that his death was an accident. Simon leaves France as the new English envoy to Portugal. Due to her role in protecting France's ties with Portugal, Mary is able to reopen negotiations for her marriage to Prince Francis, this time pressuring King Henry and Queen Catherine for better terms for herself and Scotland.
| 5 | 5 | "A Chill in the Air" | Bruce McDonald | Jennie Snyder Urman | November 14, 2013 | 1.73 |
In hopes of ousting Queen Mary, Queen Catherine arranges for her son's former lover, Lady Olivia (Yael Grobglas), to return to court and profess her romantic feelings for him. When Francis refuses to send Olivia away, Queen Mary vents her frustrations to Bash and the two kiss, witnessed by Prince Francis. Aylee is caught stealing Queen Mary's ring by Queen Catherine, whom she blackmails into letting her read Queen Mary's letters before they are posted. Queen Mary is aware of this arrangement, as she deliberately planted Aylee as her spy for Queen Catherine. Pagans are practicing human sacrifice to appease a creature in the woods; one of the pagans tells Bash he has to kill someone to replace the victim he had removed before the ritual was complete. Queen Mary learns that Kenna is having an affair with King Henry and advises her to end it, but Kenna refuses; claiming that King Henry is planning to make her his new mistress to replace Lady Diane.
| 6 | 6 | "Chosen" | Bradley Walsh | Wendy Riss Gatsiounis | November 21, 2013 | 1.81 |
The pagans mark Queen Mary as their next sacrifice, planting a necklace with a stag's head in her room. One of Queen Catherine's guards and one of Queen Mary's servants are revealed as the culprits, and they are captured and burned to death. Lady Diane (Anna Walton), who secretly practised the pagan religion in her past, advises Bash to sacrifice someone else in Queen Mary's stead. Bash prepares to sacrifice a thief. But when a pagan priest arrives, Bash reveals it as a trap and kills the pagan instead. Bash almost lets the thief free, but when the thief identifies him as the King's bastard son, Bash pushes him off a cliff. King Henry publicly declares that Kenna is his mistress. But unknown to her, King Henry is still keeping Lady Diane. Prince Francis tells Queen Mary that in order to prevent other people from using their feelings against them, they should be free to be with other people; the only exception is that Queen Mary cannot be with Bash. Prince Francis has sex with Lady Olivia, who is hoping to get pregnant and become his wife and, in time, Queen of France at the urging of Queen Catherine.
| 7 | 7 | "Left Behind" | Jeremiah Chechik | Drew Lindo | December 5, 2013 | 1.66 |
While King Henry and his troops are away, the castle is taken hostage by Count Vincent (Michael Aronov) of Italy, who seeks vengeance for the death of his son Roberto. Queen Mary and Queen Catherine form a plan together to get everyone out of the castle. While Queen Catherine, Queen Mary and Mary's ladies are feasting with the Italians, Prince Francis sneaks everyone else out through the castle's secret passageways that have been marked for safety by Clarissa. Lady Olivia is left behind to open the passage door for Queen Mary but leaves her post; she gets lost in the tunnels and is not seen again. Queen Mary and her ladies are unable to escape, but Queen Catherine successfully poisons the Count's men, who die before they can rape the four ladies. Count Vincent dies when Queen Mary stabs him, with his hand sliced off by Prince Francis. Queen Mary and Prince Francis reconcile, and they have sex. Bash learns that Lady Diane was working with Count Vincent, as part of her plan to remove King Henry's other sons, and have Bash legitimized and become King Henry's heir to the French throne in his elder half-brother's stead, much to his chagrin.
| 8 | 8 | "Fated" | Fred Gerber | Laurie McCarthy | December 12, 2013 | 1.86 |
News arrives that the Queen of England is dying and has not yet named her heir. King Henry announces that it's time for Queen Mary and Prince Francis to finally wed, because Mary is a strong claimant to the English throne and King Henry wants to take England for France. Henry II contends that Elizabeth I is illegitimate because her mother's marriage to Henry VIII was annulled and never recognized by the Catholic Church. Queen Catherine tells Queen Mary about Nostradamus' prophetic vision that her marriage will cost Prince Francis his life, asking her to leave him for his sake. Queen Mary confronts Nostradamus, who adds that one of her devoted ladies will die soon. Queen Catherine learns through Kenna of Lady Diane's plot to legitimize Bash. Furious, Queen Catherine blackmails Lady Diane, with the order her to poison Kenna and leave King Henry for good. Lady Diane refuses to poison Kenna but leaves the castle. Clarissa poisons Aylee and pushes her down the stairs, killing her in order to make Queen Mary believe Nostradamus's prophecy of misfortune and death. Queen Mary declares she will not claim the English throne instead of her second cousin Princess Elizabeth Tudor, and flees the castle with Bash.
| 9 | 9 | "For King and Country" | Helen Shaver | Story by : Alan McCullough; Teleplay by : Alan McCullough & Edgar Lyall | January 23, 2014 | 1.74 |
Queen Mary and Bash are captured by King Henry's men after a week of being on the run together. They are brought back to the castle, where Queen Mary tells a disbelieving Prince Francis about Nostradamus's prophecy. King Henry threatens to execute Bash if Queen Mary won't marry Francis. Queen Mary counter-proposes that Bash be legitimized as King Henry's new heir and she marry him instead; if King Henry agrees, Queen Mary will claim the English throne as King Henry wants. As this would require an annulment of King Henry and Queen Catherine's marriage, and would turn Prince Francis and his two younger brothers into bastards. Queen Catherine sends an assassin to kill both Queen Mary and Bash. King Henry II has the assassin killed before he can complete his task, and Queen Catherine is imprisoned. King Henry II agrees to Queen Mary's terms and leaves for Rome to seek the Pope's approval for Bash's legitimization. Clarissa is chained in a cell by Nostradamus as punishment for killing Aylee, but she stabs him and escapes.
| 10 | 10 | "Sacrifice" | Rachel Talalay | P. K. Simonds & Daniel Sinclair | January 30, 2014 | 1.62 |
Queen Catherine conspires with nobleman Lord Hugo (Ted Atherton) to remove Bash, who is acting as regent in King Henry's absence. Their poisoning attempt fails when Bash is protected by his new bodyguard, Alec (Daniel Fathers). Their second attempt involves trying to expose Bash's connection to a pregnant peasant named Isobel (Amy Forsyth), Bash's cousin, whose father was executed for being a pagan. Bash, Alec and Queen Mary sneak Isobel out of the castle but make camp in the woods when Isobel goes into labor. A group of pagans surround their tent, but leave them unharmed when Bash, Alec and Isobel perform a pagan chant. Bash explains to Queen Mary about his pagan heritage, and that the blood pagans of the wood are a different sect. Isobel dies giving birth to a daughter, and the group return to the castle, where the baby is secretly given to the castle's communal wet nurse. Lady Lola, Lady Kenna and Lady Greer are unable to find evidence of Catherine's involvement in the plots, but forge letters in Queen Catherine's handwriting to blackmail her to stop. Bash declares his feelings for Queen Mary; the pair kiss and privately honor Isobel's grave with a pagan ceremony.
| 11 | 11 | "Inquisition" | Mike Rohl | Doris Egan | February 6, 2014 | 1.64 |
King Henry returns from Rome having failed, and accuses Queen Catherine of adultery with Nostradamus so that he can execute her. Queen Catherine learns about Isobel's infant daughter, but the pagan mark on her foot has disappeared so she is unable to be used as evidence against Bash. Queen Mary and Bash discover that in the past Queen Catherine had an affair and gave birth to a child before Prince Francis was born. They tell King Henry, who realizes that the father is his friend, Richard Delacroix (Greg Bryk), and imprisons him. King Henry also dismisses Queen Catherine's efforts to reveal Bash and Diane as pagans, as he was already in full knowledge of their heritage. Queen Catherine learns that Clarissa is a foundling who was disfigured by Nostradamus's father in his efforts to remove a birthmark on her face; Clarissa is none other than Queen Catherine's secret illegitimate daughter. Bash tells Queen Mary of his fear she will never reciprocate his love for her but she manages to persuade him otherwise. Queen Catherine attempts a combined murder-suicide with Queen Mary, but Clarissa saves both of them. And Queen Catherine is again imprisoned in the tower awaiting her execution.
| 12 | 12 | "Royal Blood" | Holly Dale | Story by : Wendy Riss Gatsiounis; Teleplay by : Alan McCullough | February 27, 2014 | 1.32 |
Queen Mary and Bash disagree on what is to be done with Catherine's younger sons, Charles and Henry. Going against Queen Mary's wishes, Bash arranges for the boys to be taken out of France under the guise of an abduction, but Clarissa intercedes and abducts the young Princes' for real. Nostradamus helps Queen Catherine escape the tower, but she refuses to leave when she learns her sons are missing. Queen Catherine joins Queen Mary and Bash to find Clarissa, who wants to kill the boys in bitter vengeance for their mother abandoning her as a newborn infant due the birthmark across her left cheek. Queen Mary hits Clarissa with a rock, apparently killing her. Queen Mary and Bash reconcile, Bash agreeing to care for the boys. Queen Mary asks Bash to marry her immediately and he accepts. Lola goes to Paris to see her brother and happens to meets Francis, who helps her settle her brother's debt. Lady Lola and Prince Francis bond over their similar situation and have sex. Francis learns that Queen Catherine is to be executed and decides to return to court.
| 13 | 13 | "The Consummation" | Fred Gerber | Laurie McCarthy | March 6, 2014 | 1.75 |
Queen Mary's mother, Queen Marie de Guise (Amy Brenneman), arrives and advises her daughter against marrying Bash. Nostradamus tells Queen Catherine that he stopped having visions of Francis's death after Clarissa died, and had a new vision of Mary and Prince Francis's happy future together. When Prince Francis returns to the castle, Queen Catherine advises him to pursue Queen Mary and promises never to harm her again. King Francis and Bash fight over Queen Mary, and Prince Francis tells her of the change in Nostradamus's visions- News arrives that the Queen of England is dead, and King Henry pressures Mary to choose one of his sons. Queen Mary ultimately chooses Prince Francis and they are wed; King Henry pardons Queen Catherine for the occasion. Nostradamus discovers that Clarissa is still alive. Meanwhile, the castle, Queen Mary is angered to learn that her own mother had fabricated the news from England to push her into making a choice, and orders her to leave. Nostradamus has a deeper vision of Queen Mary and Prince Francis's future: They will indeed be happy but Prince Francis shall perish just one year into their marriage from a bleeding ear. King Henry makes Bash watch Queen Mary and Prince Francis's consummation before he is escorted from the castle. Believing the royal guards were ordered to kill him, Bash finishes them off first and escapes.
| 14 | 14 | "Dirty Laundry" | Norma Bailey | Story by : Drew Lindo; Teleplay by : Edgar Lyall | March 13, 2014 | 1.48 |
Queen Mary and Prince Francis return to court after their two-month honeymoon, arriving while the Archduke Ferdinand of Bohemia (Jonathan Higgins) is visiting. King Henry is having an affair with the Archduke's sister, and while they're having sex she accidentally falls out a window. King Henry and Queen Catherine work together to successfully make the Duchess's death look like a suicide. Bash is hunting in the woods where he meets Rowan (Hannah Anderson) and her brother Carrick (Kristian Hodko) who live there. Bash stumbles upon Lady Olivia, who is traumatized and has bite marks on her arms, and takes her to Nostradamus to be healed. Bash visits Queen Mary to tell of his suspicions that Prince Francis tried to have him killed, who firmly denies this when Queen Mary confronts him. Queen Mary learns that Lady Lola is pregnant with Prince Francis's illegitimate child, and stops her from getting an abortion that could kill her. Queen Mary reluctantly agrees to keep Lady Lola's pregnancy a secret, and promises to help her find a husband. Queen Mary tells Bash to stop caring for her but he refuses. Bash goes to Rowan, who convinces him to stay in France, and they kiss.
| 15 | 15 | "The Darkness" | Steve DiMarco | Charlie Craig | March 20, 2014 | 1.61 |
Lady Lola, Lady Kenna and Lady Greer search for husbands at a matchmaking festival. Queen Mary fears that Lady Lola will usurp her position the way that Diane usurped Catherine, and pressures Lola to accept the first interested suitor. She later changes her mind and tells Lola to make her own choice, even if it means waiting. Greer accepts the suit of Lord Castleroy (Michael Therriault) despite having feelings for Leith, the castle servant (Jonathan Keltz). Lady Greer has Lord Castleroy arrange for Leith to be sent to Spain for an apprenticeship, though she later rejects Castleroy and waits for a new suitor her parents have arranged for her. Lady Kenna has a threesome with a prostitute at King Henry's request, and later finds the prostitute choked to death. Queen Catherine helps cover up the incident, but worries that King Henry is ill and killed two of his lovers on purpose. Lady Olivia tells Nostradamus how she was sacrificed by peasants to "the Darkness", a fierce bloodthirsty creature in the woods that fed on her flesh and blood until she escaped. The blood pagans take Rowan as their next sacrifice.
| 16 | 16 | "Monsters" | Jeff Renfroe | Drew Lindo & Wendy Riss Gatsiounis | March 27, 2014 | 1.40 |
King Henry continues to behave erratically, much to everyone's concern. A servant named Penelope (Kathryn Prescott) wins "the Queen of the Bean" contest and becomes queen for a day. She is able to sexually satisfy Henry and becomes his new mistress, deliberately undermining Queen Catherine. Bash asks Prince Francis for help hunting "the Darkness", though they are unable to find any trace of it. The paternal half-brothers reconcile when Bash saves Prince Francis's life, and they learn that it was King Henry himself who ordered the guards to kill Bash, claiming that a "sacrifice had to be made", which concerns his grown sons. Lady Greer's new fiancé, Lord Julien (Giacomo Gianniotti), catches her kissing Leith and calls off the engagement. Castleroy intervenes when Leith is sent to prison, arranging that Leith be allowed to become a soldier. Castleroy proposes to Greer again, and she accepts. At Queen Mary and Lady Greer's urging, Lady Lola approaches Julien as a potential suitor. Lady Olivia and Nostradamus grow close and kiss. In order to ensure that Bash will no longer threaten Prince Francis's marriage, King Henry has Bash immediately wed to Lady Kenna.
| 17 | 17 | "Liege Lord" | Allan Kroeker | Doris Egan | April 10, 2014 | 1.23 |
Queen Mary discovers that her marriage contract has a secret clause stating that if she dies without an heir, Scotland will be given to France. Queen Mary and Prince Francis secretly meet Scottish Lord MacKenzie (Andrew Airlie) to tell him of the contract so he can return to Scotland and protest. Queen Catherine learns of Queen Mary's actions and has all the Scots who know of the contract killed. Queen Mary threatens to reveal to all that King Henry is mad, which forces Queen Catherine to burn the original marriage contract. Prince Francis is disconcerted by Queen Mary's willingness to start a French civil war to protect Scotland. Bash and Lady Kenna's marriage has a rocky start but Bash later saves Lady Kenna from King Henry's harassment and promises to always defend her. Lady Lola confesses to Julien about her pregnancy but not the father; Julien accepts this and still wants to marry her.
| 18 | 18 | "No Exit" | Mike Rohl | Hannah Schneider | April 17, 2014 | 1.39 |
Queen Mary's younger half-brother James Stewart, Earl of Moray (Joe Doyle) arrives to tell her that the Scots are chafing under Marie de Guise's rule and advises her to return to Scotland. Queen Mary wants to go immediately, but Prince Francis is reluctant. He discovers Prince James's footman was paid by the English to kill Queen Mary during her voyage so that James can be King of Scotland. When Queen Mary still insists on going, Prince Francis locks her in the tower. Queen Catherine and Lady Kenna work together, staging an intervention where a false "Bishop" condemns King Henry's sexual activities and scares the King into humility and dismissing Penelope. When this succeeds, Queen Catherine gives Penelope's estate and jewels to Lady Kenna and Bash, who celebrate with a kiss. Lady Lola and Julien are married, but Lady Lola starts to suspect that Julien has financial difficulties. Nostradamus and Lady Olivia have started a romantic relationship. But when Nostradamus has a vision of Lady Olivia's death, he sends her away to Trinidad alone, knowing that Queen Catherine will never let him go.
| 19 | 19 | "Toy Soldiers" | Chris Grismer | Mike Herro & David Strauss | April 24, 2014 | 1.35 |
One month later, news arrives that Queen Marie de Guise's castle is under siege by Scottish Protestants. Queen Mary asks for help from her war-mongering uncle Christian, Duke of Guise (Gil Darnell), who wants to become Lord Magistrate to Prince Francis as reward. To Queen Mary's disappointment, Prince Francis decides to use Christian's army to help Henry take Calais from the English. Penelope pretends to be pregnant but the ruse is uncovered by Queen Catherine; Penelope agrees to be sent to Italy to be trained to be one of Queen Catherine's spies. Castleroy meets Lady Greer's family and disapproves of the way her father treats his daughters. Castleroy gives the marriage contract to Lady Greer to review, and arranges for her to oversee her sisters' dowries and future husbands. Lady Greer is grateful, and the pair kiss. Bash still has romantic feelings for Queen Mary, but consummates his marriage with Lady Kenna. Prince Francis leaves with Christian and his army to invade Calais.
| 20 | 20 | "Higher Ground" | Sudz Sutherland | Story by : David Babcock & Daniel Sinclair; Teleplay by : Alan McCullough | May 1, 2014 | 1.42 |
Queen Mary hires John (Tahmoh Penikett), a mercenary, to steal Queen Catherine's money to help Queen Marie de Guise. John abducts Queen Catherine, tricking her into paying him twice his fee to betray the person who hired him. John asks Queen Mary to pick a scapegoat for the kidnapping, and Queen Mary chooses Queen Catherine's unscrupulous cousin, Hortensia (Shauna MacDonald), whose head is given to Queen Catherine. Queen Mary then takes control of Hortensia's guards and pays John to lead them to rescue Marie de Guise in Scotland. Prince Francis leads a company of twelve men, including Leith, towards Calais. They successfully take a castle from the English en route. While injured, Leith confesses his love for a woman above his station, and Prince Francis promises to award him lands and title to pursue that love. Lady Lola learns that Julien has secretly received her dowry and is about to abandon her. Julien changes his mind and confesses that he is almost penniless, but that he has truly fallen in love with her. The pair agree to work it out.
| 21 | 21 | "Long Live the King" | Jeremiah Chechik | Wendy Riss Gatsiounis & Drew Lindo | May 8, 2014 | 1.34 |
Buoyed by Prince Francis' successful taking of Calais and Queen Mary Tudor I's death at 42, King Henry wants to immediately invade England despite their forces being depleted. Queen Catherine and Queen Mary plot to poison King Henry, angering Prince Francis, but they call it off when King Francis convinces his father to delay the invasion. King Henry decides that Prince Francis is unsuited for conquest and must be killed so that King Henry can wed Queen Mary himself. While searching for "the Darkness", Bash rescues a boy named Pascal (Lucius Hoyos), not realizing he is the son of the pagan priest Bash had killed months earlier. Lady Kenna cares for Pascal while Bash and Nostradamus head into the mountains to continue the search. Lady Lola learns that Julien is actually Remy, the real Lord Julien's personal secretary, who took his identity when Julien died in an accident. Remy's ruse is revealed by Julien's uncle Bartos (Geordie Johnson), whom Lady Lola accidentally kills when Bartos attacks Remy. She and Remy burn down the house with Bartos's body in it to make it look like Julien died, so that Remy can escape and Lady Lola can return as a widow to court.
| 22 | 22 | "Slaughter of Innocence" | David Frazee | Doris Egan & Laurie McCarthy | May 15, 2014 | 1.24 |
Due to King Henry's increasing madness, Prince Francis, Queen Mary and Queen Catherine all devise a coup. Christian advises Queen Mary to lay claim to England in order to inspire the French to rally around her. At the jousting match celebrating the victory at Calais, Queen Mary wears the English coat of arms. King Henry, jealous of the response Queen Mary gets, decides to participate in the joust himself. It is revealed that Prince Francis secretly switched with the opposing knight, Sir Montgomery, and mortally wounds his father for to sake and stability of the realm of France. On his deathbed, the King's sanity returns; he makes Queen Catherine promise to befriend Lady Diane, and confesses to Prince Francis that he poisoned his own elder brother to become king, therefore warning Prince Francis not to betray those he loves most. King Henry dies and Francis is proclaimed king. Leith returns with rewards but Greer, though she still loves him, refuses to marry him, saying it is not enough. Profoundly heartbroken, Leith declares he will become more successful but will never return to her. Leith flirts with a woman named Yvette (Sarah Winter), not knowing that she is Castleroy's daughter. Bash saves Lady Kenna and Pascal from "the Darkness", revealing it to be a nothing but a mere human man, whom claims that blood sacrifices are necessary to appease the gods and keep the plague at bay, but Bash kills him. Queen Mary receives a letter from Lady Lola that she is in labour and possibly dying. Queen Mary finally tells King Francis he is the father of Lola's illegitimate child, just as news arrives that the plague has risen just as the Darkness predicted. Queen Mary tries to convince King Francis to stay, but he insists on going to Lola. Queen Mary closes the gate behind him when he leaves.
