= Reign season 2 =

Reign
- Season 2
- Season 2 DVD Cover
- Starring: Adelaide Kane; Toby Regbo; Megan Follows; Torrance Coombs; Celina Sinden; Caitlin Stasey; Anna Popplewell; Jonathan Keltz; Sean Teale; Craig Parker; Rose Williams
- No. of episodes: 22

Release
- Original network: The CW
- Original release: October 2, 2014 – May 14, 2015

Season chronology
- ← Previous; Season 1 Next → Season 3

The second season of Reign, an American historical romantic drama, consisted of 22 episodes which aired between October 2, 2014, and May 14, 2015. The series, created by Stephanie SenGupta and Laurie McCarthy, aired on The CW.

== Season overview ==
The season opens after the death of King Henry II, and follows the rise of Francis and Mary as King and Queen of France and Scotland. Together they have to balance their marriage with their roles as monarchs, and deal with the rising religious conflict between Catholics and Protestants, as well as the ambitions of the rival House of Bourbon for the throne of France.

== Cast and characters ==
=== Main ===
- Adelaide Kane as Mary, Queen of Scots
- Toby Regbo as Francis II of France
- Megan Follows as Catherine de' Medici
- Torrance Coombs as Sebastian "Bash" de Poitiers
- Celina Sinden as Lady Greer
- Caitlin Stasey as Lady Kenna
- Anna Popplewell as Lady Lola
- Jonathan Keltz as Leith Bayard
- Sean Teale as Prince Louis of Condé
- Craig Parker as Stéphane Narcisse
- Rose Williams as Princess Claude of France

=== Recurring ===
- Rossif Sutherland as Nostradamus
- Amy Brenneman as Marie de Guise
- Michael Therriault as Aloysius Castleroy
- Alexandra Ordolis as Delphine
- Ben Aldridge as Antoine of Navarre
- Vince Nappo as Renaude
- Jane Spidell as Caroline
- Linzee Barclay as Sharlene

=== Guest ===
- Alan van Sprang as Henry II of France
- Rachel Skarsten as Queen Elizabeth I
- Anna Walton as Lady Diane de Poitiers
- Katie Boland as Clarissa de Medici
- Gil Darnell as Christian, Duke of Guise
- Kjartan Hewitt as Eduard Narcisse
- Ella Ballentine as Voland girl
- Ari Millen as Roger
- Charlotte Hegele as Jenny
- Noam Jenkins as Lord Gifford
- Salvatore Antonio as Cardinal Vasari
- Siobhan Williams as Amelie
- Rob Stewart as Lord Burgess
- Jonathan Watton as Ridley
- Pascal Langdale as a Cardinal
- Vincent Gale as Lord Akers

== Episodes ==
No. overall	No. in season	Title	Directed by	Written by	Original release date	US viewers (millions)
23	1	"The Plague"	Fred Gerber	Laurie McCarthy	October 2, 2014	1.01
Queen Mary and Queen Catherine have the castle locked down, but "the plague" manages to enter. Mary and Catherine clash when powerful noble Eduard Narcisse (Kjartan Hewitt) demands they throw his rival Pierre Voland in with the sick. Queen Mary refuses, so Eduard has Voland's entire family poisoned with diseased water; Yvette dies as well since she was staying with the Volands. In response, Queen Mary has Eduard thrown in the dungeon with plague victim bodies. Outside the castle, King Francis II finds Lola and their newly-born son, and they are aided by Francis's cousin, Louis of Condé (Sean Teale). Louis offers to send Lola and her baby away on a boat, headed for the Netherlands, but King Francis refuses, as he wants to keep his son close to him. Bash is exposed to the plague, and although he doesn't fall sick, he sees the ghost of a young Voland girl (Ella Ballentine), who warns him that the others who have died are angry and that there will be a "reckoning". Lady Kenna tries to protect Pascal, but he is exposed to the Black Death and is claimed by it.
24	2	"Drawn and Quartered"	Fred Gerber	Wendy Riss Gatsiounis & Drew Lindo	October 9, 2014	1.09
King Francis, Louis, Lady Lola and her illegitimate child arrive safely at the castle. Queen Mary is discomfited by the baby, but gives King Francis her blessing to claim him. Eduard's father, Stéphane Narcisse (Craig Parker), arrives to investigate his son's death, and arrests Nostradamus to take the fall for Mary's decision. Catherine and Nostradamus have a falling out when she refuses to help him escape, and Nostradamus hints that Clarissa is very much alive, meaning that King Francis is still destined to die young by Queen Mary's unintentional hand. Working together, Queen Mary and King Francis discover that Eduard and his father Narcisse killed Voland to cover up their crimes. In order to get Narcisse to drop the charges, King Francis gives him the lands he had previously bestowed to Leith. Queen Mary helps Nostradamus leave the castle, avoiding Queen Catherine. King Francis has an encounter with a servant named Caroline (Jane Spidell) who is seemingly possessed by the spirit of the late King Henry. Castleroy blames Leith for Yvette's death and, furious and heartbroken, abandons Lady Greer at court.
25	3	"Coronation"	Holly Dale	Harley Peyton	October 16, 2014	1.27
Preparations are underway for Francis and Mary's coronation, but the pair are preoccupied with a food shortage manufactured by Narcisse. Francis has a summoner (Romano Orzari) confirm that Caroline is possessed by the restless spirit of King Henry, who accuses King Francis of killing him. While King Francis is busy, Queen Mary makes a deal with Herr Schuler (David Jansen), a German duke, who offers grain in return for the release of Protestant prisoners. King Francis is angered by Queen Mary's move, as it undermines his authority in front of the nobility, but they later reconcile and present a united front when the plan is a success, forcing Lord Narcisse to concede defeat. Queen Mary convinces Prince Louis to help them in this conflict, gaining his respect. Bash, now Prince Francis's deputy, investigates a possible murder but is thwarted when Kenna, fearful for his life, burns the evidence. The coronation takes place successfully.
26	4	"The Lamb and the Slaughter"	Sudz Sutherland	Laurie McCarthy & Adele Lim	October 23, 2014	1.26
A grand christening is held for King Francis and Lady Lola's illegitimate son. Because King Francis wanted to publicly claim his son, he is named John Phillip Valois- Angouleme. Previous to the ceremony, Queen Mary tells King Francis that she's pregnant. Estelle (Camille Stopps), the young village girl who helped Lady Lola give birth, goes to Lady Lola for help because she wants to be freed of her new marriage to Lord Narcisse. Believing the Lord to be abusive, Lady Lola and Queen Mary sneak Estelle out of the castle, but Estelle later jumps off a cliff to her death. Lord Narcisse tells Lady Lola that the stories of abuse were untrue and that he was overprotective of Estelle because she was suicidal. Bash and Prince Louis investigate stories of three cloaked riders who are branding people in order to claim their souls. A shepherd (Steven McCarthy) who was marked by the riders goes crazy and kills his family. Prince Louis is skeptical, but Bash believes that restless and raging spirits of the departed are staying behind to exact either justice or vengeance, which secretly worries King Francis. After bleeding severely at John's christening, Queen Mary tragically loses her newborn child. Leith returns to court, which triggers Greer into seeking Castleroy out to tell him that he's a better match for her than Leith will ever be; Lady Greer and Lord Castleroy then end up having sex.
27	5	"Blood for Blood"	Norma Bailey	P.K. Simonds & Nancy Won	October 30, 2014	1.23
Strong discord and hatred are rising between Catholics and Protestants, and in one confrontation Prince Louis's Protestant nephew Emile is killed. The revelation is that Caroline has been in the pay of Lord Narcisse; that she had fabricated being possessed by Henry II of France's spiritual essence in order to get the King into confessing to his father's murder. Lord Narcisse hears this confession and blackmails King Francis into letting the Catholic murderers of Emile go free. When Queen Mary questions him, King Francis lies that he believes she will never give him an heir, which deeply hurts her. Lady Greer learns that Lord Castleroy is close to converting to Protestantism, but she accepts it and the pair are wed. Lady Lola is surprised when she's approached by none other than Lord Narcisse, with the intent of pursuing her as a sexual partner.
28	6	"Three Queens"	Steve DiMarco	Doris Egan	November 6, 2014	1.33
Queen Mary joins Queen Catherine on a trip away from the castle, but their carriage is attacked, forcing them to escape disguised as commoners. They encounter a pair of actors, Roger (Ari Millen) and Jenny (Charlotte Hegele), who are pretending to be the King Francis and Queen Mary. Roger and Jenny have been terrorizing the locals, thus ruining the reputation of the King and Queen. The two queens are eventually caught by Gifford (Noam Jenkins), the mastermind of the plot, who reveals that he was sent by Queen Elizabeth as retaliation for her distant cousin's publicly staking claim to the English throne. Roger and Jenny are killed by Gifford, but Queen Mary overpowers Gifford just as King Francis arrives to rescue them. Queen Catherine learns that Queen Mary wanted to go to Beauvais, because of her recent miscarriage, decides to see a fertility doctor. Lady Lola is disowned by her family after they learn of her having King Francis's illegitimate child. Lady Lola resolves to become independent and tries to recover her dowry, but is only successful when Narcisse helps her. The pair grow closer through flirtation and court games, though Lady Lola is still cautious of his reputation.
29	7	"The Prince of the Blood"	Deborah Chow	Drew Lindo & Wendy Riss Gatsiounis	November 13, 2014	1.19
Lord Narcisse demands that King Francis sign an edict that will force everyone in France to openly declare their religion. King Francis turns to Bash for help, confessing the truth that it was he who had murdered their father. Lady Lola is tasked by King Francis to plant false evidence that would get Narcisse arrested as a traitor but she claims she was unable to go through with it. Queen Mary, who is kept out of the loop, goes to Louis for help. Inspired by Queen Mary's bravery, Prince Louis protests the edict by falsely claiming to be Protestant, though his protest causes other real Protestant nobles to speak up. King Francis is fearful for the lives of his dearest loved ones and signs the edict anyway, inciting the disappointment and fury of his wife and queen. King Francis's younger sister, Princess Claude (Rose Williams) returns to court. Lady Kenna tries to befriend Princess Claude but is rebuffed, because Princess Claude wants Bash for herself. Queen Catherine sees the spirits of her two daughters, Princess Henriette and Princess Emone, who threaten to hurt their elder sister.
30	8	"Terror of the Faithful"	Charles Binamé	Adele Lim & Melody Fox	November 20, 2014	1.10
Queen Mary and King Francis's relationship continues to be strained. As a result of Francis' Edict of Romorantin, Cardinal Vasari (Salvatore Antonio) from Rome is torturing suspected Protestants. A Protestant Minister (Douglas Nyback) threatens Francis with a fake claim that he has set explosives somewhere to kill Catholics, so King Francis has him arrested. While in royal custody, the Minister is killed by his fellow Protestants to make him a martyr for the Protestant cause, and this ignites open fighting. Lady Lola reveals to King Francis that she did plant the evidence on Lord Narcisse. However, it had been removed and Lord Narcisse is aware of her treachery. Queen Catherine tries to send her surviving daughter away by marrying her off to the son of a Bavarian count, but the Princess sabotages this by making public sexual overtures on Lord Narcisse.: One of Queen Catherine's suppressed memories reveal that royal fraternal twins, Henriette and Emone, had mysteriously perished as infants. And that she believed that the young Princess Claude was responsible.
31	9	"Acts of War"	Fred Gerber	Laurie McCarthy & Nancy Won	December 4, 2014	1.22
Queen Mary suggests that Princess Claude, who is Catholic, and Prince Louis, who has converted to Protestantism, be wed as a symbol of interfaith relations. King Francis accepts this suggestion, but only so that it will distress Lord Narcisse and trick him into revealing where he's hiding Montgomery, the last witness who knows that King Francis had killed his own father of his own will. Prince Louis seemingly agrees to the engagement with Princess Claude, but leaves a letter for Mary and quits the castle. While King Francis and Bash are away in an attempt to destroy Sir Montgomery, a group of Protestant assassins sneak into the castle. Frustrated at being unable to find King Francis, one of the assassins rapes Queen Mary. After she is comforted by her mother-in-law, who helps her hide the evidence and present a strong front to the people of France. King Francis, when he returns, is distraught and blames himself. Castleroy and Lady Greer discover that their charity donations were used to fund the assassination attempt. Lord Narcisse confides to Lady Lola that he is appalled at the Protestants' desperation and regrets to have brought things this far.
32	10	"Mercy"	Rich Newey	Wendy Riss Gatsiounis & Drew Lindo	December 11, 2014	1.42
In the search for Queen Mary's attackers, numerous Protestants, including Castleroy, are imprisoned. King Francis has a dozen Protestants publicly hanged, throws Narcisse into the dungeon, and finally confesses to Queen Mary that Lord Narcisse has been blackmailing him over his regicide. Mary and Louis follow a lead to her attackers, eventually finding them and burning them to death. Mary remains shaken from recent events and asks Francis that they be husband and wife in name only. Castleroy is released due to Leith's petitioning, and Lady Greer tells him to leave court without her. In addition to seeing her twin daughters as nine-year-olds, as she had imagined them many times before, Queen Catherine starts seeing the spirit of her husband, who advises her to kill their living daughter to appease the two who had perished as mere infants. Prince Louis receives a visit from his brother Antoine (Ben Aldridge), King of Navarre, who reminds him not to sympathize with Queen Mary because they have their own agenda. Queen Mary receives Prince Louis's delayed letter where he confesses his love for her.
33	11	"Getaway"	Lynne Stopkewich	Daniel Sinclair	January 22, 2015	1.16
The bodies of the recently-executed Protestants bear the marks of the dark riders, so Cardinal Perazzo (Bruce Ramsay) concludes that Protestants have this mark to declare their extremism. He orders Louis's arrest since he has the mark, so Queen Mary helps the Prince escape to Antoine's estate. Antoine tells Prince Louis that their agenda is best served if Prince Louis seduces Queen Mary, but he refuses. When the Cardinal's men arrive to arrest Prince Louis, Queen Mary and Leith have the mark burned away. King Francis and Bash work together to undermine Cardinal Perazzo by putting the mark on his lover, forcing the Cardinal to recant his stance on the mark's meaning. Lady Kenna investigates her suspicion that Queen Catherine is poisoning Princess Claude, and learns that the Princess and Bash were once lovers. Princess Claude confronts her mother, who confesses to the poisoning because she believes that Claude killed her infant younger sisters, but Princess Claude claims that she did no such thing. Queen Mary remains distant from King Francis, despite his efforts to offer comfort and peace.
34	12	"Banished"	Larysa Kondracki	Chelsey Lora	January 29, 2015	1.02
King Francis and Prince Louis come to blows over Mary — Francis is jealous of Louis's closeness with Queen Mary, while Louis blames Francis for Mary's rape. Lola accepts Mary's request that she offer herself as a companion for Louis, so to deflect court gossip over Louis's obvious feelings for Queen Mary. When Greer and Castleroy's connection to the radical Protestants is revealed, Greer is stripped of her title and wealth, and sent away from court. Bash investigates the late Princess Emone and Princess Henriette's very premature demise, discovering that they were killed when his own mother, Lady Diane, had left the nursery window open by shattering it in sheer outrage she had felt towards King Henry II. Queen Catherine almost freezes to death when the restless spirits of King Henry, and nine-year-old Princess Henriette and Princess Emone encourage her to leave her earthly family for her "real one", but she is saved by Bash. The Queen Mother finally confronts the spirits, telling her twin daughters' to leave and wait for her when her time finally does come, and banishing King Henry's essence away for all of the harm and suffering he has caused during his reign. She then takes out her bitter vengeance on them by striking her lifelong rival with a fireplace poker and strangling her to death.
35	13	"Sins of the Past"	Deborah Chow	Doris Egan & Melody Fox	February 5, 2015	0.97
King Francis and Queen Mary learn that King Antoine is thinking of allying with their enemy, Queen Elizabeth of England as he believes that Bash had killed his and Prince Louis's elder brother, Prince Marcus, during the Italian Wars, and wants vengeance, either by killing Bash or seducing Lady Kenna. Bash investigates a man (Greg Calderone) who had supposedly returned to the Underworld by a mysteriously woman in white. Queen Catherine has a prophetic vision of her eldest son's death. However, King Francis, Queen Mary and the royal doctors attribute this to syphilis, which she has symptoms of. Queen Catherine, with Lord Narcisse's help, discovers that she is actually being slowly poisoned by the pages of the late King Henry's old Bible, which they conclude was directly responsible for gradually turning King Henry insane. Queen Mary attempts to renew her relationship with King Francis but finds it too difficult, so she gives him permission to find someone new to love.
36	14	"The End of the Mourning"	Nathaniel Goodman	Laurie McCarthy & Nancy Won	February 12, 2015	1.03
Queen Catherine informs King Francis, Queen Mary and Bash about King Henry II's poisoned Bible, which kicks off an investigation into who was truly responsible for the madness of the late king, and all of the extremely difficult problems that had followed. King Francis, Bash and Queen Mary find evidence implicating Prince Louis, but Lord Narcisse finds stronger evidence that it was the doing of Queen Mary's maternal uncle, François, Duke of Guise. However, King Antoine really was behind the poisoning, and he had bribed Lord Narcisse into framing and killing the Duke of Guise before he could be questioned. King Francis still wishes to reconcile with Queen Mary, but she has secretly grown attached to Prince Louis. Lady Greer struggles to find a livelihood for herself as an exile, and befriends Sharlene (Linzee Barclay), a prostitute, and helps set her up with a customer.
37	15	"Forbidden"	Charles Binamé	Laurie McCarthy & Nancy Won	February 19, 2015	1.03
Queen Marie de Guise visits French court to attend the funeral of her brother. While there, she pressures Mary to conceive an heir and gives her opiates to help her relax. Mary agrees, but she and Francis are still unable to have sex, and Francis learns about Mary's tentative feelings for Louis. Queen Marie de Guise reveals to her daughter that she is dying, so Queen Mary decides she should return to Scotland soon, and asks Prince Louis to join her. Prince Louis is conflicted because his elder brother has obtained a secret marriage proposal for Prince Louis with Queen Elizabeth I. Lady Kenna feels neglected by Bash, and this gives King Antoine the opportunity to try to seduce her. Bash investigates the woman in white, Sister Delphine (Alexandra Ordolis), after hearing more of her "healing miracles" that come with a high price. King Francis arranges a marriage for his and Lady Lola's illegitimate son with the Habsburgs, but it's sabotaged when Lady Lola meets them while high on Queen Marie's opiates. Greer helps Sharlene and her other new prostitute friends by teaching them how to act like ladies and sending them to a party at French court.
38	16	"Tasting Revenge"	Lee Rose	P. K. Simonds & Drew Lindo	March 12, 2015	0.96
News is out that Queen Mary and King Francis are estranged, so various nobles parade their daughters at court in the hopes of Francis taking one as his mistress. When Queen Mary turns down another of King Francis's attempts to reconcile, he has sex with Narcisse's niece, Amelie (Siobhan Williams). King Francis, as advised by Lady Lola, tells Queen Mary that she can be with Prince Louis as long as she is discreet. Queen Mary and Prince Louis sneak out of the castle on their way to Scotland, but are seen by King Antoine and turn back. King Antoine, believing an alliance with England is better, successfully gets Louis to a secret meeting with Queen Elizabeth I's envoy, Lord Burgess (Rob Stewart). King Antoine pressures Kenna to leave Bash for him, but she turns him down when she uncovers his true intentions. Bash is still hurt when he learns that Lady Kenna considered Prince Antoine's proposal. Leith finds Greer to tell her that Castleroy is in prison for his connection to the radicals, and discovers that she has become a madam. When he accepts this, the pair renew their relationship and have sex.
39	17	"Tempting Fate"	Sudz Sutherland	Lisa Randolph	March 19, 2015	1.09
Queen Mary's agent, Ridley (Jonathan Watton), is killed while preparing her route to Scotland, and his letters from Queen Mary are stolen. Prince Louis confesses to Mary about his meetings with Burgess. Although angered at first, Queen Mary works with Louis to manipulate Burgess into giving them information they need on the safe routes to Scotland. Queen Mary demands that Louis choose between her and Queen Elizabeth; Louis chooses Queen Mary, and they have sex. Bash and Lady Kenna separate. While investigating a case, Bash is mortally wounded, but is saved by Delphine when he begs her to, despite her reminder that her miracles come with a price. Unknown to Mary, her letters outlining her plans to abandon France were taken by General Renaude (Vince Nappo), who passes them to Narcisse, who informs Catherine. When Catherine tells Francis, he collapses, and blood drips from his ear. Catherine fears that this means Nostradamous's prophecy is coming true; Narcisse comforts her and they have sex. When Catherine learns that Claude is trying to seduce Narcisse, she orders Leith to become Claude's bodyguard. Leith attempts to get an annulment for Greer, and meets a cardinal (Pascal Langdale) who is intrigued by his case.
40	18	"Reversal of Fortune"	Anne Wheeler	Drew Lindo & Wendy Riss Gatsiounis	April 16, 2015	1.01
Francis remains unconscious and is feared to be dying. In 1560, Mary receives news that her loyalists in Scotland are under attack by Protestants in the Siege of Leith. She tries to send French soldiers to the cause but is blocked by Queen Catherine and Lord Narcisse. Bash fears that King Francis's sickness is the cost of his being revived by Delphine. He discovers Clarissa alive in a village and poisons her, hoping her death will save King Francis. Soon after, King Francis wakes up while his wife is by his side. Despite his mother's protests, King Francis gives Queen Mary the soldiers she needs, citing France's alliance with Scotland. However, King Francis tells Queen Mary that he can never trust her again. Kenna meets Renaude, who is drawn to her until he learns that she's married. Greer's prostitution business continues to grow, and Leith secretly performs acts of thuggery for the cardinal to obtain Greer's annulment. Prince Louis is frustrated when Queen Mary gives up on their plan to leave for Scotland.
41	19	"Abandoned"	Deborah Chow	Nancy Won & Robert Doty	April 23, 2015	0.82
Protestant radicals take a monastery hostage in retaliation for Francis's sending troops to Scotland, but Bash and Renaude recover it successfully. When Catherine and Narcisse try to frame Louis for the hostage situation, Louis asks Mary to leave France with him, but she refuses. Louis fears he's no longer safe in France, so when he's approached by another English envoy, Lord Akers (Vincent Gale), he accepts Elizabeth's proposal. Louis immediately takes part in a secret proxy wedding, making him King consort of England and a traitor to France. The day after, all participants in the ceremony aside from Louis and Akers are mysteriously killed and evidence of the wedding destroyed. Akers, uncertain whether the marriage is still valid, abandons Louis to return to England. Mary learns about the wedding and is heartbroken. Lola and Kenna visit Greer's brothel and are surprised by her success. Bash has seemingly moved on to another woman, enabling Kenna and Renaude to grow closer. Catherine and Narcisse's sexual relationship continues, though Catherine is concerned when she learns that Lord Narcisse still flirts with Lady Lola.
42	20	"Fugitive"	Norma Bailey	Doris Egan & Daniel Sinclair	April 30, 2015	0.84
Prince Louis is captured by Renaude while trying to flee France with travel papers given by Mary. Akers returns to rescue Prince Louis, informing him that Elizabeth still wishes to marry him, and wants him to take the crown of France for her. Prince Louis, with Akers's encouragement, starts gathering a Protestant army in readiness to attack King Francis. Queen Mary realizes the ramifications of her helping Prince Louis and tries to reconcile with King Francis. Queen Catherine tells Lord Narcisse to prove his loyalty by hurting Lady Lola deeply; he is successful, but is angered at being forced to do it. Lady Kenna pursues Renaude, and they have sex. Princess Claude catches Leith trying to steal for the cardinal, but when she sees how much Leith loves Lady Greer, she gives him her diamond earrings. Leith proposes to Lady Greer, but she refuses, saying she wants to keep her new independence.
43	21	"The Siege"	Andy Mikita	Adele Lim & Lisa Randolph	May 7, 2015	0.97
Louis's army continues to grow, and he coerces Renaude into joining his side by using Renaude's son as leverage. Renaude and his men attack Francis's castle in a first wave but are defeated, and Renaude is captured. After the rest of Louis's army surrounds the castle, Louis asks Francis to surrender — promising that in doing so, Louis will protect Mary from Elizabeth. Francis refuses and decides to make a stand. In anticipation for the oncoming battle, Narcisse kisses Lola; Catherine hears about it and in retaliation tricks Narcisse into eating steak made from his beloved horse. Leith protects Princess Claude from Prince Louis's soldiers by hiding in the castle tunnels, where Claude sees a mysterious figure in the shadows. Princess Claude is touched by Leith's commitment to protecting her, and Leith tells her that his relationship with Greer has ended. Bash starts a romantic relationship with Delphine and brings her to the castle, hoping that she can replace Nostradamus as a court seer. On the eve of the attack, Delphine performs a sexual pagan ritual with a servant boy. Queen Mary sneaks out of the castle to go to Prince Louis, asking that he protect her because she's pregnant with his love child.
44	22	"Burn"	Fred Gerber	Laurie McCarthy & Nancy Won	May 14, 2015	0.83
Queen Mary's going to Prince Louis is a ruse; she has Lady Greer's prostitutes poison Louis's soldiers, and stabs Louis in the stomach. King Francis rides out with his soldiers to capture Louis and clear the rest of Louis's scattered army, ending the coup. Catherine wants Louis to be executed but Francis refuses, not wanting to make Louis a Protestant martyr. Frustrated, Catherine has Lola kidnapped and her son seemingly murdered, so to frame Louis. Louis is to be executed but escapes thanks to Elizabeth's agents. Narcisse uncovers Catherine's plot and saves Lola and her son; Francis is angered at his mother's actions and has Catherine exiled from court. Renaude is executed for treason. Kenna tries to reconcile with Bash, but is rejected when Bash learns that she's pregnant with Renaude's child. Kenna leaves court to have her child outside France, and on her journey meets the young King of Imereti. Queen Mary and King Francis renew their relationship and make love. Afterward, the King meets Nostradamus, whom he has been seeing in secret; Francis is still dying and Nostradamus has been giving him medicine to stave off the symptoms. Delphine is blamed for the presence of a "monster" in the castle, and is arrested after being found with the bloodied corpse of the servant she had sex with. Bash learns that his and Delphine's souls are bound together due to the ritual Delphine performed. Delphine is tied to a burning stake for her execution as a witch, but she escapes. Catherine blames Mary for her situation and travels to England, where she offers Queen Elizabeth (Rachel Skarsten) her help in destroying Queen Mary for good.
