= Reign season 3 =

Reign
- Season 3
- Season 3 DVD Cover
- Starring: Adelaide Kane; Toby Regbo; Megan Follows; Rachel Skarsten; Torrance Coombs; Celina Sinden; Anna Popplewell; Jonathan Keltz; Craig Parker; Rose Williams; Charlie Carrick; Ben Geurens
- No. of episodes: 18

Release
- Original network: The CW
- Original release: October 9, 2015 – June 20, 2016

Season chronology
- ← Previous; Season 2 Next → Season 4

The third season of Reign, an American historical romantic drama, consisted of 18 episodes which aired between October 9, 2015, and June 20, 2016. The series, created by Stephanie SenGupta and Laurie McCarthy, aired on The CW.

On January 11, 2015, The CW renewed the series for a third season. At The CW's 2015-16 Upfront, it was announced that the series would be moving to a different night, airing on Fridays at 8/7c, instead of Thursdays at 9/8c. The latter half of the season, from episode 11 onward, returned on April 25 in a new Monday timeslot before Jane the Virgin.

== Season overview ==
The season follows King Francis' declining health and death partway through the season, leaving Mary a widow and struggling to find new footing since she's no longer bound to France as its queen. Francis' younger brother Charles is crowned the new underage king, with Catherine as regent. Also introduces the court of Queen Elizabeth Tudor of England who plots against Queen Mary, fends off marital prospects, and deals with her secret love affair with Lord Robert Dudley.

== Cast and characters ==
=== Main ===
- Adelaide Kane as Queen Mary Stuart
- Toby Regbo as King Francis II
- Megan Follows as Queen Catherine
- Rachel Skarsten as Queen Elizabeth I of England
- Torrance Coombs as Sebastian "Bash" de Poitiers
- Celina Sinden as Greer
- Anna Popplewell as Lady Lola
- Jonathan Keltz as Leith Bayard
- Craig Parker as Stéphane Narcisse
- Rose Williams as Claude of France
- Charlie Carrick as Robert Dudley
- Ben Geurens as Gideon Blackburn

=== Recurring ===
- Alexandra Ordolis as Delphine
- Spencer MacPherson as Charles IX of France
- Clara Pasieka as Amy Dudley
- Tom Everett Scott as William
- Nick Lee as Nicholas
- Mark Ghanimé as Don Carlos of Spain
- Nathaniel Middleton as Christophe
- Dan Jeannotte as James Stewart

=== Guest ===
- Rossif Sutherland as Nostradamus
- Amy Brenneman as Queen Marie de Guise
- Michael Therriault as Aloysius Castleroy
- Ben Aldridge as King Antoine
- John Barrowman as Munro, leader of the McFee

== Episodes ==
| No. overall | No. in season | Title | Directed by | Written by | Original release date | US viewers (millions) |
|---|---|---|---|---|---|---|
| 45 | 1 | "Three Queens, Two Tigers" | Holly Dale | Laurie McCarthy | October 9, 2015 | 0.95 |
In England, Catherine and Queen Elizabeth send messengers to Rome to expose Queen Mary's affair with Prince Louis, but the messengers are quietly assassinated by the Vatican. Queen Mary and King Francis are in need of resources, and engage a privateer named Martin (Sameer Usmani) to steal for them. Martin tricks Greer, who has returned to court, into having sex with him. Queen Elizabeth, as advised by Queen Catherine, sends a proposal to France for her marriage to King Francis's younger brother Prince Charles (Spencer MacPherson). King Francis refuses and reveals to queen Mary that he is surely dying gradually. However, Queen Mary and King Francis pretend to accept the proposal, providing a diversion so their spies can kidnap Queen Catherine and bring her back to France for imprisonment. Queen Elizabeth is having an affair with her subject, commoner Robert Dudley (Charlie Carrick), while Lord Robert's wife, Amy (Clara Pasieka) starts an affair with Queen Elizabeth's adviser William (Tom Everett Scott) as part of a plan to get her husband back. Lord Narcisse wants to court Lady Lola but is forbidden by King Francis. Delphine, still a fugitive, tells Bash that she is innocent of the murder she's accused of, and that the true murderer is still in the castle.
| 46 | 2 | "Betrothed" | Fred Gerber | Lisa Randolph | October 16, 2015 | 1.00 |
Queen Mary and King Francis prepare for the transition of power by telling Princess Claude, Crown Prince Charles and Bash that King Francis is slowly dying, and asking Charles to marry his wife after his death. Charles initially refuses and sides with Catherine, but changes his mind when Catherine uses him in an attempt to assassinate the Bourbons. Under pressure from the Privy Council, Elizabeth sacrifices her friend Donatella (Cristina Rosato) to take the blame for Catherine's machinations in England, and insults Robert Dudley in front of the Council so he will not be made ambassador. Queen Elizabeth chooses her "retired" spy, Nicholas Throckmorton (Nick Lee) to be her new ambassador to France. Princess Claude and Leith grow close, and Leith learns that Francis is dying. Mary tells Lady Lola that King Francis is dying, and warns her to be wary of Narcisse. Narcisse tricks Lola into believing that Catherine wants to destroy her; Lady Lola, thinking Lord Narcisse can truly protect her now, starts an affair with him. Bash continues to investigate Delphine and mysterious murders in the village.
| 47 | 3 | "Extreme Measures" | Holly Dale | Drew Lindo & Wendy Riss Gatsiounis | October 23, 2015 | 0.90 |
King Francis has another collapse, and the news spreads to various parties, including King Antoine of Navarre and Nicholas, newly-arrived ambassador of England. King Antoine has come to King Francis to ask for help, and is told to sign away his claim to the French throne in return. Queen Mary releases her mother-in-law from prison to help block Nicholas's attempts to interfere; they are successful and King Antoine signs away his claim. Prince Charles accidentally causes his friend, Constance (Jordan Monaghan), to overdose on opium, but she is saved with Princess Claude and Lord Narcisse's help. King Francis learns of Narcisse's helping Charles and gives his blessing for Narcisse and Lola to wed immediately. Leith lets it slip to Claude that he is afraid of developing feelings for her. Mary realizes that the alliance with Scotland is too damaging to France, so she decides not to marry Prince Charles after King Francis dies, but sets her sights on Don Carlos of Spain. King Francis and Queen Mary decide it is best that Queen Catherine be the regent after King Francis's death.
| 48 | 4 | "The Price" | Nathaniel Goodman | April Blair & Robert Doty | November 6, 2015 | 0.94 |
The ailing Queen Marie de Guise needs help evading the English-backed Protestants in Scotland, so Mary and Francis manipulate Nicholas into giving false intelligence to Elizabeth, ultimately enraging the English queen and saving Queen Marie. Don Carlos of Spain (Mark Ghanimé) visits England to court Queen Elizabeth, but is rejected when he demands she disprove a rumour that she's secretly a man. Queen Elizabeth tells Robert her suspicion that Amy is responsible for the rumour; Robert assaults Amy but is quickly remorseful and promises to end his affair with Queen Elizabeth. Bash tracks down and saves Delphine from being tortured by nuns. Prince Charles, having learned of Delphine's extraordinary abilities in healing, orders her to revive his half-brother, who has died in Queen Mary's arms. Queen Mary agrees to Delphine's price of a life for a life, but when King Francis awakens, Queen Marie de Guise simultaneously dies in Scotland. Queen Catherine figures out that Lord Narcisse tricked Lola into marrying him. Lady Lola is suspicious that Lord Narcisse is still keeping secrets from her.
| 49 | 5 | "In a Clearing" | Deborah Chow | Shannon Goss | November 13, 2015 | 1.03 |
March 1560: Queen Catherine reads the letter from the embalmer that states the date when he received Francis's body. The note reads "March 29th, 1560" as when Francis's body was received; Sebastian also mentions that Francis was put in his coffin just "two days" later, meaning Francis's death is around the end of March 1560. Francis has been seemingly cured of all ills thanks to Delphine. Mary agrees to a new proposal of peace from Elizabeth and signs an accord to give up her claim to the English throne. However, Nostradamus returns to warn Catherine and Francis that he has had another vision of Francis's death. Francis agrees to take precautions, but leaves the castle with Mary on a trip to Paris. Along the way they stop to swim in a lake, and Queen Mary is kidnapped by bandits. Francis comes to her rescue but is hurt in the melee. King Francis, dying, asks Queen Mary to stay in France until Charles is king and the regency is secured, and professes his wish that Mary fall in love again one day. Francis then dies in Queen Mary's arms. Queen Mary, suspecting that Elizabeth was behind the bandits, confronts Nicholas in a sheer fury and burns the accord. Later Mary learns that the bandits were Scottish Protestants hoping to assassinate her. Bash and Delphine break the spell that was binding them together, and investigate the mysterious murders, tracking them down to a man that rips out people's hearts.
| 50 | 6 | "Fight or Flight" | Charles Binamé | Lisa Randolph | November 20, 2015 | 1.09 |
Late April, 1560: Three weeks have passed since Francis's death, but Catherine has been unable to rally support from the Privy Council to be voted regent. Lord Grenier (Ted Whittall), a war profiteer, attempts to manipulate the council and become regent, but is blocked by Queen Mary and Queen Catherine. For the sake of inspiring support for Queen Catherine, Queen Mary dissolves the costly French-Scottish alliance in Catherine's name and prepares to return to Scotland. At Charles's urging, Mary decides to stay in France until she has made a new alliance, and sends word to Don Carlos for a possible new marriage. Catherine seduces Narcisse, with the double goals of destroying his marriage with Lola, and getting his possibly crucial vote for the regency. Elizabeth, disappointed with Nicholas's failures, replaces him as ambassador to France with Gideon Blackburn (Ben Geurens), whom Elizabeth instructs to seduce Mary and sabotage her marriage prospects. Elizabeth summons Robert and Amy back to court, but Amy fakes an illness so that she and Robert can move to Cornwall for her "health". Claude and Leith spend more time together, despite Leith's wariness of their difference in status.
| 51 | 7 | "The Hound and the Hare" | Anne Wheeler | Bo Yeon Kim & Erika Lippoldt | December 4, 2015 | 1.04 |
Queen Catherine believes that Narcisse will help her become regent, especially when he makes her leave her servant lover, Christophe (Nathaniel Middleton), for him. However on the day of the vote, Cardinal Morel (Blair Williams) presents a blackened liver that supposedly belonged to Francis, "proving" that the king was poisoned and Catherine the likely culprit. Narcisse, with the council's support, is declared regent. Bash and Delphine expect the killer they are investigating to attack Greer next, but the killer attacks Delphine instead. Delphine is spared when she temporarily absorbs the killer's murderous instinct, but is unable to identify him. Mary and Don Carlos are close to an engagement, but are stalled by Gideon Blackburn, who claims that Don Carlos has a "dark secret". Upon investigation, Queen Mary learns that Don Carlos is a masochist who desires to be flogged. Mary is reluctant, but she and Catherine stage a secret flogging session for Don Carlos which ends badly — Don Carlos falls and cracks his skull, but survives and wanders out of the room.
| 52 | 8 | "Our Undoing" | Lee Rose | Gretchen J. Berg & Aaron Harberts | January 8, 2016 | 1.10 |
Don Carlos survives his injury but is brain-damaged. Fadrique, Duke of Alba (Richard De Klerk) investigates the accident, but Mary and Catherine escape being implicated. Narcisse holds an inquest into Catherine's possible poisoning of Francis, but with Bash's help, Catherine exhumes Francis's intact corpse, proving that the blackened liver was from someone else. Unknown to all, Cardinal Morel was behind the attempt to frame Queen Catherine at the urging of a secret party; upon his failure, he is killed. Lord Cunningham (Giles Panton), a Scottish Lord, brings Mary news of famine in Scotland, and that Elizabeth has taken Lola's family hostage and wants Lola to travel to her court in exchange for their freedom. At Catherine's advice, Mary gets engaged to the child-like Don Carlos, who is smitten with Mary and sends grain to Scotland at her urging. Lady Lola discovers the truth of how Narcisse manipulated her into marrying him; she leaves him and goes to Queen Elizabeth's court to save her family.
| 53 | 9 | "Wedlock" | Norma Bailey | Wendy Riss Gatsiounis & Drew Lindo | January 15, 2016 | 1.10 |
Queen Mary's wedding to Don Carlos approaches. Don Carlos secretly regains his memory, and seeks his revenge on Mary by asking for the crown matrimonial of Scotland. Mary is suspicious and asks Gideon for help; he learns that Don Carlos plans to assassinate Mary after the wedding. Queen Mary tricks Don Carlos into confessing his intentions to all, and the wedding is cancelled. Queen Mary also learns that Gideon is being blackmailed by Queen Elizabeth, who is holding Lord Gideon's daughter hostage. Queen Elizabeth is pregnant with Robert's child, so she pressures Robert to divorce Amy and marry her. When Lady Amy learns of this, she goes stark mad and frames Robert for murder by killing herself. Queen Catherine continues her affair with Christophe and has him elevated to a member of the King's Guard. Princess Claude and Leith consummate their relationship. Soon afterward Narcisse announces that Claude will be married off to a wealthy Duke, so her dowry can be used to pay some of the French crown's debts. Delphine fears that the murderer's killing instinct is inside her, and the murderer kills again.
| 54 | 10 | "Bruises that Lie" | Megan Follows | P.K. Simmons | January 22, 2016 | 1.24 |
Queen Mary allies with Gideon against Elizabeth; together they fool Elizabeth's spies by making it appear that Gideon has seduced Mary, thus securing the release of Gideon's daughter, Agatha. However, Gideon has developed real feelings for Mary. Claude is married to Duke Boinel, who hits her on their wedding night, but she hits him back and runs away. Angered by what happened to Princess Claude, Prince Charles forces the Privy Council to remove Lord Narcisse as regent and appoint Queen Catherine instead. Unbeknownst to them, Queen Catherine had secretly bribed Duke Boinel to strike Claude, setting those events in motion. Princess Claude's marriage is annulled, and Leith promises to rise in station until he is worthy of marrying her. Lady Lola arrives at English court and learns that Queen Elizabeth has no intention of releasing her family. Queen Elizabeth is poisoned and miscarries her baby. Martin returns to France and learns that Greer is pregnant with his illegitimate child, and that she's planning to give it away to her married sister, Lady Ellen (Lyla Porter-Follows).
| 55 | 11 | "Succession" | Charles Binamé | April Blair | April 25, 2016 | 0.92 |
Prince Charles's coronation is marred by the discovery of dead bodies in the castle, victims of the same murderer Bash has been tracking. With Christophe's help, Bash finds evidence that the castle butcher (Christopher Jacot) is responsible, and he is hanged. However, Catherine learns that Christophe is the true murderer, but he blackmails her into keeping his secret. Mary spends time with Gideon and his young daughter Agatha. There is some discussion of the proposal of Eric XIV of Sweden to marry Mary. Queen Mary learns that the Protestant preacher John Knox is leading the persecution of Catholics in Scotland, and calls upon the Vatican for help raising an army against him. Elizabeth presses Lola for information on Queen Mary, but Lola refuses to comply. Instead Lola tells Elizabeth her new discovery that William has been paying courtesans to dress up as Elizabeth for his pleasure. Elizabeth uses this lead to uncover that William is in love with her and poisoned her, causing her miscarriage; she banishes him from court for good.
| 56 | 12 | "No Way Out" | Fred Gerber | Wendy Riss Gatsiounis | May 2, 2016 | 0.96 |
Queen Elizabeth publicly names Mary as her successor, on the condition that Elizabeth choose Mary's next husband. Mary has Rome's approval to raise an army, and is ordered by Archbishop Ridolfi (Juan Chioran) to accept Elizabeth's terms, as they plan to assassinate Elizabeth and have Mary become queen of England. Mary asks Gideon for help finding a way to protect Elizabeth, and has sex with him; soon after, Gideon kills his servant to protect Queen Mary. When Queen Elizabeth sees how much Robert is hated in England, she makes him Earl of Leicester and commands him to sail to France and wed Queen Mary, hoping to save his life. Lola reaches out to the heartbroken Queen Elizabeth. Queen Mary asks if Greer will return with her to Scotland, but Greer declines. Queen Catherine is threatened by the mysterious thirteen Red Knights who seek vengeance for the wrongful execution of thirteen knights by King Henry II (actually it was Philip IV) many years ago for allegedly worshipping Baphomet.
| 57 | 13 | "Strange Bedfellows" | Norma Bailey | Shannon Goss | May 9, 2016 | 0.78 |
Robert arrives in France and Queen Mary agrees to marry him. She and Gideon discover that although the Vatican wish to put Queen Mary on the English throne, they are going to replace her with a distant Catholic cousin, Joseph Tudor. Gideon kidnaps Joseph but is arrested by Archbishop Ridolfi before he can expose the plot, so he passes the task of warning Elizabeth to Robert. Robert returns to England with Joseph and is hailed a hero. Queen Elizabeth executes Joseph and declares that she will have no successor; Robert and Queen Mary's engagement is cancelled as well. Queen Mary arranges for Gideon to return to England to save him from the Vatican's retribution, and the pair bid their goodbyes. Queen Catherine, with Bash and Christophe's help, learns that the Red Knights are a movement to destroy the House of Valois, and were behind the attempt to frame her for poisoning King Francis. Queen Catherine reconciles with Lord Narcisse in her preparation to fight back. Greer breaks ties with Ellen and her husband because of their duplicity. Princess Claude offers to financially help Leith start a new business, and he accepts.
| 58 | 14 | "To the Death" | Michael McGowan | Lily Sparks | May 16, 2016 | 0.76 |
Queen Mary discovers that Greer is pregnant, and uses her new Vatican-funded army to free Aloysius Castleroy, Greer's husband, from prison. Greer and Aloysius reconcile, and leave to start a new life elsewhere. Bash confesses to Queen Mary that his feelings for her never fully went away, and promises to go to Scotland with her. Charles and Narcisse secretly go to a high-stakes casino to win money to pay the royal soldiers. However, the Red Knights poison all the royal generals just before they are paid, so to frame Catherine and Charles for the massacre. Queen Elizabeth conspires with Lola to punish Beatrice Somerset, a lady who testified against Elizabeth's mother, Anne Boleyn, which led to Anne's execution. Queen Elizabeth learns that the accusation of incest against Anne was true, but Anne only resorted to it because she feared her husband King Henry VIII would kill her if she did not give him a son. Elizabeth pardons Beatrice and rewards Lola's loyalty by bringing Jean-Philippe to her.
| 59 | 15 | "Safe Passage" | Stuart Gillard | Drew Lindo | May 23, 2016 | 0.95 |
News of the massacre gets out and defenders of the generals rise up against Catherine and Charles. Delphine is brought back to court by Charles to help flush out the Red Knights, but is killed by Christophe when she recognizes him. Bash figures out that Christophe killed Delphine and kills him. Bash also learns of Catherine's other misdeeds — protecting Christophe, killing Bash's mother, and having Claude beaten to win the Regency — and resigns as Deputy of France. Queen Mary uses her mercenary army to protect Catherine and Charles from an uprising of their soldiers, and then leaves for Scotland for good. Narcisse and Bash join Mary on her ship; Narcisse wants to save Lola, and Bash wants to protect Mary. Catherine falls out with Charles and Claude when they learn what she did to earn the Regency. Lola meets with Gideon, who is searching for a way to free her.
| 60 | 16 | "Clans" | Fred Gerber | Gretchen J. Berg & Aaron Harberts | June 6, 2016 | 0.96 |
Queen Mary's ship sinks in a storm, though she, Narcisse and Bash are washed ashore in northern Scotland. Mary and Narcisse narrowly escape being killed by a local clan, the McFee, while Bash is taken by druids to be healed. Narcisse leaves for England after helping reunite Queen Mary with Bash. The McFee attack and slaughter the druids, so Mary and Bash pretend to be sibling merchants in order to survive. Queen Mary and Bash also agree to travel with the McFee — this clan was behind the attack that killed King Francis, so Mary hopes to meet their leader and exact revenge. Mary is confounded with the Wulvers. Queen Elizabeth and Lady Lola entertain the Prince Magnus, Duke of Holstein of Denmark (Kyle Gatehouse), a potential suitor for Elizabeth, and avoid an international mishap due to Lola's quick thinking. Elizabeth learns of Queen Mary's ship sinking and, believing that Queen Mary is dead, invites Lady Lola to join English court permanently. King Charles, hoping to assert his power and be granted full kingship, pursues his own plan to stop the Red Knights in Orsay, but is betrayed by one of his friends and captured.
| 61 | 17 | "Intruders" | Lee Rose | April Blair & Drew Lindo | June 13, 2016 | 0.81 |
Queen Mother Catherine, working with Leith, traps and kills most of the Red Knights, but is unable to find King Charles, who has fled captivity on his own. John Knox (Jonathan Goad) learns of Queen Mary's presumed death, and pressures Queen Mary's bastard younger half-brother James Stewart (Dan Jeannotte) to dissolve the Scottish monarchy. Queen Mary and Bash are brought to Munro (John Barrowman), leader of the McFee; Munro figures out who Mary is, but she kills him. Queen Mary and Bash flee to Edinburgh, where she makes a triumphant entrance before the Scottish nobles. Queen Elizabeth sends her troops to invade Scotland and take the throne, and refuses to recall them even when she hears Mary may be alive. Narcisse manages to sneak into Elizabeth's palace to reconcile with Lady Lola, but before Lady Lola can escape with him, she receives a coded letter supposedly from Queen Mary ordering her to assassinate Queen Elizabeth.
| 62 | 18 | "Spiders in a Jar" | Deborah Chow | Laurie McCarthy | June 20, 2016 | 0.93 |
Lady Lola conspires with a Scottish assassin to kill Queen Elizabeth Tudor, but the assassination attempt fails and both are captured. Queen Elizabeth has Lola executed by public beheading, which Narcisse is there to witness. Mary consolidates her power in Scotland, and successfully uses the suicide of a Catholic priest as propaganda in gaining support. Gideon arrives in Scotland as part of an English delegation, and he and Mary resume their affair. When Queen Mary learns of Lady Lola's execution, she vows to take Queen Elizabeth's throne, and asks Gideon to help her. James figures out that John Knox was behind the order to assassinate Elizabeth, but he has no evidence. Bash leaves Queen Mary in order to join the druids and hone his own supernatural gifts, as Nostradamus and Delphine had with theirs. King Charles safely returns to French court and ousts Catherine as regent. Catherine retaliates by parading her third son, Henry, who is next in line to the throne. Catherine gives her blessing to Princess Claude and Leith to get married, but Leith is betrayed and killed by the machinations of Martel de Guise (Lewis Kirk), a jealous former lover of Princess Claude's. Queen Elizabeth asks Robert to marry her, but she is dismayed to learn that he has married Lettice Knollys.
