= Reign season 4 =

Reign
- Season 4
- Season 4 DVD cover
- Starring: Adelaide Kane; Toby Regbo; Megan Follows; Rachel Skarsten; Celina Sinden; Craig Parker; Rose Williams; Jonathan Keltz; Ben Geurens; Dan Jeannotte; Jonathan Goad; Spencer MacPherson; Will Kemp
- No. of episodes: 16

Release
- Original network: The CW
- Original release: February 10 – June 17, 2017

Season chronology
- ← Previous; Season 3

The fourth season of Reign, an American historical romantic drama, premiered on February 10, 2017. The series, created by Stephanie SenGupta and Laurie McCarthy, airs on The CW. On December 7, 2016 the CW announced that this would be the final season and would consist of 16 episodes.

== Season overview ==
The season has Queen Mary Stuart returned to Scotland and trying to regain power in her torn homeland. She has to manage her allies, such as her bastard half-brother James and the outspoken Lord Bothwell, as well as her enemies, such as the Protestant preacher John Knox. Tensions mount between Queen Mary and Queen Elizabeth, with Queen Mary marrying her distant cousin Lord Darnley, an English Catholic claimant to the English throne, in the hopes of taking England. In France, Queen Mother Catherine has to protect her second son, King Charles IX, from the ambitions of her daughter Queen Leeza of Spain and her youngest son, Prince Henry from inciting further wars.

== Cast and characters ==
=== Main ===
- Adelaide Kane as Mary, Queen of Scots
- Toby Regbo as Francis II of France (Note: Toby Regbo appears and is credited as a series regular in the finale only)
- Megan Follows as Catherine de' Medici
- Rachel Skarsten as Queen Elizabeth I of England
- Celina Sinden as Greer
- Craig Parker as Stephan Narcisse
- Rose Williams as Princess Claude of France
- Jonathan Keltz as Leith Bayard
- Ben Geurens as Gideon Blackburn
- Dan Jeannotte as James Stewart, Lord Moray
- Jonathan Goad as John Knox
- Spencer MacPherson as King Charles IX of France
- Will Kemp as Henry Stuart, Lord Darnley

=== Recurring ===
- Anastasia Phillips as Queen Leeza of Spain
- Nola Augustson as Lady Lennox
- Claire Hunter as Emily Knox
- Steve Lund as Luc Narcisse
- Sara Garcia as Keira
- Philip Riccio as Ambassador Richards
- Adam Croasdell as Lord Bothwell
- Andrew Shaver as David Rizzio
- Ann Pirvu as Nicole
- Nick Slater as Prince Henry of Valois
- Steve Byers as Archduke Ferdinand of Austria
- Megan Hutchings as Jane
- John Ralston as Lord Ruthven

=== Guest ===
- Mark Ghanimé as Don Carlos of Spain
- Lewis Kirk as Martel de Guise
- Chad Connell as Lord Taylor
- Max Lloyd-Jones as John Hawkins
- James Gilbert as Lord Barrett
- Tyrone Savage as Lord Hamilton
- Richard Fleeshman as Francis Drake
- Rebecca Liddiard as Margot of France
- Jake Foy as James VI of Scotland

== Episodes ==
No. overall	No. in season	Title	Directed by	Written by	Original release date	US viewers (millions)
63	1	"With Friends Like These..."	Stuart Gillard	Wendy Riss Gatsiounis & Drew Lindo	February 10, 2017	0.78
The Earl of Clan Gordon (Stewart Arnott) kidnaps Queen Mary in the hopes of forcing her to marry his son George Gordon, 5th Earl of Huntly. Mary escapes, and foils John Knox's attempts to manipulate the situation. Queen Leeza (Anastasia Phillips), eldest daughter of Catherine and wife of Philip II of Spain, arrives at French court, where her pro-Spain policies cause her to clash with Queen Mother Catherine and Princess Claude. Princess Claude discovers that Martel was behind Leith's death, and works with her mother to stage Martel's "suicide". Gideon discovers that John Knox was behind the assassination attempt on Queen Elizabeth, and informs both Queen Elizabeth and Queen Mary. Despite James's concerns, Queen Mary wants to marry Darnley (Will Kemp), an English Catholic with a claim on the English throne. Darnley's mother, Lady Lennox (Nola Augustson), has been working behind Elizabeth's back for the match, but Darnley promises Queen Elizabeth that he will stay away from Scotland if she arranges for him to marry Keira (Sara Garcia), the woman he loves. Greer arrives in Scotland to comfort Queen Mary over Lady Lola's death.
64	2	"A Grain of Deception"	Fred Gerber	Patti Carr & Lara Olsen	February 17, 2017	0.67
Mary and James clash when they disagree over how to handle a leak among her advisors. Mary orders James to seduce John Knox's wife, Emily (Claire Hunter), for information but he refuses. John Knox visits English court, where he narrowly escapes being entrapped by Elizabeth, Gideon and Narcisse. Narcisse, angered at being unable to avenge Lola, sabotages Elizabeth's attempt to allow Darnley to marry Keira. At French court, Charles is increasingly absent from his royal duties, forcing Catherine to block Leeza's attempts to bring Spanish influence there. Unknown to all, Charles is suffering from an illness. Mary asks Greer to move to Scotland permanently, and to manage Lola's family's estates.
65	3	"Leaps of Faith"	Charles Binamé	April Blair & Laurie McCarthy	February 24, 2017	0.59
Elizabeth is scared that if Darnley, a Stuart cousin of Mary, marries Mary, then their offspring would have an undeniable claim to the throne of England since both Mary and Darnley have the same paternal grandmother of the House of Tudor and both of the child's parents would be Tudor/Stuart royals. Gideon, with Elizabeth's blessing, goes to Mary with a proposal: if Mary marries him and abdicates, Elizabeth will make their firstborn son heir to the throne of a united England and Scotland. (However, Gideon has secretly promised to Elizabeth that his marriage to Mary would attenuate her claim to the English throne since Gideon is a commoner.) Mary is ready to accept, but changes her mind after meeting Lady Lennox, who shares her past experience of being Elizabeth's prisoner. Lady Lennox (daughter of Margaret Tudor) also sabotages Darnley's attempts to be with Keira, who is married off to someone else. Narcisse returns to French court and works with Catherine to remove Leeza's Spanish choice for Chancellor of France. Catherine and Narcisse send a young woman, Bianca (Sofia Banzhaf), to Charles in the hopes of rejuvenating him, but she disappears. Claude finds solace in religion in the wake of Leith's death. James pursues an affair with Emily Knox (based on Margaret Knox).
66	4	"Playing with Fire"	Fred Gerber	John J. Sakmar & Kenny Lenhart	March 3, 2017	0.64
Queen Mary and Darnley meet; Darnley is openly ambitious and accepts Mary's terms of marriage. Mary is impressed when Darnley rescues a child from a fire, though she later receives a letter from a "Loyal Watchman" claiming that Darnley staged the rescue. Leeza tries to have Claude sent to a nunnery for adultery but Catherine intervenes, arranging for Claude's marriage to Narcisse's son, Luc (Steve Lund) instead. On Claude's wedding night, Leith returns to French court, still alive, but is arrested by Narcisse before he can announce his presence. Bianca is found alive, but Charles continues to act erratically. Elizabeth works to get Lord Maxford (Ted Dykstra) on her side, so to gain lumber for ships to protect England from a rumored Spanish fleet. Greer confesses to Mary that her marriage with Castleroy is troubled.
67	5	"Highland Games"	Michael McGowan	Robert Doty	March 17, 2017	0.76
Queen Mary and Darnley's engagement is announced, but Scottish noble Lord Taylor (Chad Connell) accuses Darnley of being as dishonorable as his father and challenges him to a boxing match. Mary confronts Darnley about the fire rescue, and he admits that he staged it. Mary and Darnley reach an understanding, and work together to win the match and gain the nobles' support. James investigates the identity of the "Loyal Watchman". Leith's return is revealed to all, but Luc is unable to annul his marriage due to Narcisse's manipulations, and so offers Claude an open marriage instead. Catherine learns that Charles's behaviour is due to his trauma from his time fleeing from the Red Knights. Castleroy and Rose arrive in Scotland, but Castleroy tells Greer that he's fallen in love with another.
68	6	"Love & Death"	Megan Follows	Drew Lindo & Wendy Riss Gatsiounis	March 24, 2017	0.75
Queen Elizabeth I sends Ambassador Richards (Philip Riccio) to bring Darnley back to England, but he is rebuffed by Mary and Darnley. Mary is warned by the "Loyal Watchman" that an assassin has been sent to kill Darnley, but Darnley successfully defends himself against the assassin. Mary and Darnley's relationship deepens, and they have sex, but Keira arrives in Scotland soon after, hoping to reunite with Darnley. Leith is unable to cope with Claude and Luc being married, so he demands payment from Narcisse to leave for good. Claude tells Leith to meet her a year in the future, after she has given Luc the heir he needs. Elizabeth brings in a physician to treat Gideon's daughter, but he is unable to help her. Leeza discovers that Charles has fled, and vows that Spain will take control of France.
69	7	"Hanging Swords"	Lee Rose	Chris Atwood & Kamran Pasha	March 31, 2017	0.66
Mary struggles to mediate between Darnley and James, whose dislike of each other deepens. Mary learns from the "Loyal Watchman" that Darnley has resumed his affair with Keira and confronts him — heartbroken, she vows that their marriage will never be more than political. Mary meets and has a battle of wits with Lord Bothwell (Adam Croasdell). Catherine and Narcisse find Charles living happily with a peasant family and having grown attached to the family's daughter, Nicole (Ann Pirvu). Charles returns to court with Nicole by his side, and reveals to Catherine, Narcisse and Leeza that he has found purpose in Protestantism. Leeza leaves for Spain after extracting a promise from Catherine to replace Charles with his devoutly Catholic younger brother, Henry. Narcisse warns Catherine that Nicole is power-hungry. Elizabeth prepares to invade Scotland, but changes her mind after spending time with Gideon's daughter before she dies.
70	8	"Uncharted Waters"	Fred Gerber	Bo Yeon Kim & Erika Lippoldt	April 7, 2017	0.71
Preparations are underway for Mary and Darnley's wedding, but Darnley's careless behavior causes a minor crisis with Lucrezia de Medici. Bothwell helps Mary manage the crisis, and tries to convince her not to wed Darnley; Bothwell is the "Loyal Watchman" and promised Marie de Guise to protect Mary. Mary meets David Rizzio (Andrew Shaver), who relays a prophecy from Bash: Mary may have love, or an heir to a united Scotland and England, but not both. James, on Mary's orders, tries to have Keira thrown out, but Keira is fatally injured in an accident, and Darnley blames Mary. Catherine arrives in Scotland for the wedding, and comforts a distraught Mary. Elizabeth meets John Hawkins (Max Lloyd-Jones), and commissions him to explore the New World for England. Luc gains King Charles's ear and manages to convince him to re-embrace Catholicism, but King Charles's behavior is still erratic.
71	9	"Pulling Strings"	Andy Mikita	April Blair & Laurie McCarthy	April 14, 2017	0.63
Bothwell kisses Mary and tries to convince her to marry him instead, but she refuses because she's already pregnant with Darnley's child. Darnley conspires with Cardinal Odomo (Paulino Nunes) to usurp Mary's power, but is caught by Mary thanks to the help of Catherine, David, and James. Martin arrives in Scotland for the wedding and spends time with Rose. James grows close to Greer and learns that Martin is Rose's father. John Knox confronts Emily about her affair with James, and reduces her to a servant. Mary and Darnley are successfully wed despite their mutual animosity. Elizabeth is angered when a number of Catholic border towns switch from English to Scottish in support of Queen Mary and Darnley; Gideon comforts her and they have sex.
72	10	"A Better Man"	Dawn Wilkinson	John J. Sakmar & Kenny Lenhart	April 28, 2017	0.68
Queen Mary and Lord Darnley clash over her attempt to ally with Lord Hamilton (Tyrone Savage), Darnley's family enemy, but they tentatively reconcile when Mary tells him that she's pregnant. Greer and James kiss. Emily feeds James false information from John Knox, causing a misunderstanding that leads to Hamilton's death and James's willing exile from Scotland to protect Mary's reputation. Elizabeth seeks a husband and shows interest in Archduke Ferdinand of Austria (Steve Byers); at the same time, Gideon accepts Elizabeth's request to try to get her pregnant, testing her fertility before any potential marriage. Queen Catherine successfully pressures Narcisse into starting an affair with Nicole, so to better control her and King Charles. Charles finally accepts responsibility of being king, just when his younger brother, Henry (Nick Slater), returns to court.
73	11	"Dead of Night"	Deborah Chow	Wendy Riss Gatsiounis & Drew Lindo	May 5, 2017	0.69
Queen Mary and Lord Darnley send loyalist Lord Barrett (James Gilbert) on a secret mission to invade England and capture Queen Elizabeth. Darnley asks Mary for the crown matrimonial; when she refuses, he threatens to tell Queen Elizabeth of the plot. Queen Mary sends Bothwell and Rizzio to meet with Gideon and stop the mission entirely, and they are successful. Mary swears to Gideon that she'll not threaten Elizabeth's throne ever again. Gideon tells Queen Elizabeth of the failed coup, in the hopes of encouraging her to marry Ferdinand and protect England. Mary appoints Bothwell her bodyguard and Rizzio her advisor, so to shut Darnley out from power. Henry purposely antagonizes King Charles, though his behaviour causes Narcisse to switch allegiances to him. Queen Catherine casts a spell in the hopes of helping King Charles.
74	12	"The Shakedown"	Norma Bailey	Patti Carr & Lara Olsen	May 12, 2017	0.76
Mary and Darnley's relationship deteriorates further. Mary learns of Darnley's underhanded attempts to gain support from the Scottish nobles against her; she shares this with Bothwell, who advises her to consider killing Darnley. Darnley's tactics gain the attention of John Knox, who offers a secret alliance to depose Mary as queen. Gideon takes Elizabeth to a secret getaway, but they are caught by Elizabeth's servant Jane (Megan Hutchings); Elizabeth spares Jane, but Jane secretly writes a letter of her discovery to an unknown person. Charles grows more aggressive, but confesses to Catherine that his actions are due to his fear of his weakness as king. Claude realizes she's developed feelings for Luc, but Luc discovers Claude's promise to reunite with Leith and says that their marriage will be purely a political one.
75	13	"Coup de Grace"	Megan Follows	John J. Sakmar & Kerry Lenhart	May 19, 2017	0.71
Darnley and John Knox conspire to depose Mary by accusing her of adultery with Bothwell. Darnley leads his anti-Queen Mary allies in storming Queen Mary's chambers, but find her with Rizzio instead of Lord Bothwell; Lord Darnley loses control of the situation and Lord Ruthven (John Ralston) incites the others to collectively stab Rizzio to death. They put Queen Mary under house arrest, but she convinces Darnley that he's being used, and they escape the castle together. After Lord Darnley flees to save himself, Mary meets up with Bothwell and their pro-Mary allies, and vows to take back Edinburgh castle by force. Gideon travels to French court to settle a diplomatic issue; while he is away, Ferdinand confronts Queen Elizabeth about her affair with Gideon and gets her to promise to end it. Lord Henry shows Nicole that Narcisse has only been using her, and the pair have sex. Narcisse resumes his affair with Queen Mother Catherine.
76	14	"A Bride, A Box, A Body"	Andy Mikita	April Blair & Robert D. Doty	June 2, 2017	0.74
Mary, Bothwell, and their allies take back Edinburgh castle, but are only able to capture Lord Ruthven, who is hanged. Darnley returns to Mary, and helps her track down the other anti-Mary nobles, but the nobles are killed in a fire before they can be arrested. Although Bothwell suspects Darnley caused the fire to save himself, Mary decides to reconcile with Darnley for the sake of peace. Lady Lennox learns that Darnley did cause fire, at the urging of "Keira". Catherine, Claude and Luc try to convince Henry to end his affair with Nicole, but are unsuccessful. Charles is supposed to choose a Spanish bride, but announces that he'll marry Nicole instead. Luc asks Charles to support the annulment of his marriage to Claude. Narcisse pursues his revenge for Lola's death — he castrates John Knox, and has Gideon poisoned to hurt Queen Elizabeth I. Gideon suddenly dies in her arms.
77	15	"Blood in the Water"	Charles Binamé	Drew Lindo & Wendy Riss Gatsiounis	June 9, 2017	0.67
Queen Mary survives a difficult birth to a son, thanks to the help of Bothwell and Greer. While Queen Mary is in labour, Lady Lennox manipulates Darnley into taking over the Privy Council and ousting Queen Mary from power. Mary writes to Elizabeth in kinship, asking her to protect her son and accept him as heir to a united Scotland and England. Darnley is mentally unstable due to syphilis; he hallucinates Keira, and flees the castle with his son. Leeza visits French court and revives the conflict between Charles and Henry. Although Catherine finds a resolution, Charles is determined to kill Henry over Nicole. Queen Elizabeth believes that Ferdinand killed Gideon, and has naval commander Francis Drake (Richard Fleeshman) steal a cargo ship heading for Austria. Drake is successful, but is forced to engage Spanish warships, triggering a potential war with Spain. Elizabeth eventually suspects Jane and has her arrested; Jane is Narcisse's spy, and was the one who poisoned Gideon. Luc gives Claude permission to go to Leith, but she returns to court when she discovers that Leith is engaged to someone else.
78	16	"All it Cost Her..."	Holly Dale	April Blair & Laurie McCarthy	June 16, 2017	0.75
Darnley abandons his son at the urging of "Keira". James returns to Scottish court and helps recover the baby; in commemoration, Mary names her son James after her brother. Mary finally allows Bothwell to assassinate Darnley. Bothwell and his allies blow up Darnley's house with gunpowder, but Darnley escapes, necessitating Bothwell's strangling Darnley to death. John Knox leads the accusation of regicide on Mary and Bothwell, and they are arrested. Elizabeth has Jane killed, breaks her engagement with Ferdinand, and vows to withstand any Spanish attack. Catherine engages a witch, Emmanuelle (Catherine Bérubé) to murder Nicole. They are successful, and with the murder blamed on Spain, Charles and Henry reconcile. However, Emmanuelle warns Catherine that her sons will be the downfall of the Valois house, and that Catherine is to keep her youngest daughter Margot (Rebecca Liddiard) close by her side. Twenty-one years later, Mary is under house arrest in England, having fled her enemies in Scotland following a broken promise from Elizabeth to protect her. Mary's son, King James VI of Scotland (Jake Foy), begs Elizabeth to spare Mary's life, but ultimately concedes that England and Scotland can never be united as long as Mary is alive, and accepts Elizabeth's offer to be her heir. Queen Mary is executed via axe, and awakens in the afterlife with King Francis by her side.

== Ratings ==
Viewership and ratings per episode of Reign season 4
No.	Title	Air date	Rating/share (18–49)	Viewers (millions)	DVR (18–49)	DVR viewers (millions)	Total (18–49)	Total viewers (millions)
1	"With Friends Like These"	February 10, 2017	0.2/1	0.78	TBD	TBD	TBD	TBD
2	"A Grain of Deception"	February 17, 2017	0.2/1	0.67	0.2	0.50	0.4	1.17
3	"Leaps of Faith"	February 24, 2017	0.2/1	0.59	TBD	TBD	TBD	TBD
4	"Playing with Fire"	March 3, 2017	0.2/1	0.68	TBD	TBD	TBD	TBD
5	"Highland Games"	March 17, 2017	0.2/1	0.76	TBD	TBD	TBD	TBD
6	"Love & Death"	March 24, 2017	0.2/1	0.75	TBD	TBD	TBD	TBD
7	"Hanging Swords"	March 31, 2017	0.2/1	0.66	TBD	TBD	TBD	TBD
8	"Uncharted Waters"	April 7, 2017	0.2/1	0.71	TBD	TBD	TBD	TBD
9	"Pulling Strings"	April 14, 2017	0.2/1	0.63	TBD	TBD	TBD	TBD
10	"A Better Man"	April 28, 2017	0.2/1	0.68	TBD	TBD	TBD	TBD
11	"Dead of Night"	May 5, 2017	0.2/1	0.69	TBD	TBD	TBD	TBD
12	"The Shakedown"	May 12, 2017	0.2/1	0.76	TBD	TBD	TBD	TBD
13	"Coup de Grace"	May 19, 2017	0.2/1	0.71	TBD	TBD	TBD	TBD
14	"A Bride. A Box. A Body."	June 2, 2017	0.2/1	0.74	TBD	TBD	TBD	TBD
15	"Blood in the Water"	June 9, 2017	0.2/1	0.67	TBD	TBD	TBD	TBD
16	"All It Cost Her..."	June 16, 2017	0.2/1	0.75	0.2	1.26	0.4	2.01
