= List of Reign episodes =

Reign is a historical romantic drama television series created by Laurie McCarthy and Stephanie Sengupta which premiered on July 18, 2013 on The CW. The series stars Adelaide Kane in the role of Mary, Queen of Scots, depicting her early life in France until her return to Scotland. During the course of the series, 78 episodes of Reign aired over four seasons. The series finale aired on June 16, 2017.

== Series overview ==
Season	Episodes	Originally released	
Season	Episodes	First released	Last released
1	22	October 17, 2013	May 15, 2014
2	22	October 2, 2014	May 14, 2015
3	18	October 9, 2015	June 20, 2016
4	16	February 10, 2017	June 16, 2017

== Episodes ==
=== Season 1 (2013–14) ===
No. overall	No. in season	Title	Directed by	Written by	Original release date	US viewers (millions)
1	1	"Pilot"	Brad Silberling	Laurie McCarthy & Stephanie Sengupta	October 17, 2013	1.98
2	2	"Snakes in the Garden"	Matt Hastings	Laurie McCarthy	October 24, 2013	1.83
3	3	"Kissed"	Holly Dale	Doris Egan	October 31, 2013	1.57
4	4	"Hearts and Minds"	Scott Peters	P. K. Simonds	November 7, 2013	1.64
5	5	"A Chill in the Air"	Bruce McDonald	Jennie Snyder Urman	November 14, 2013	1.73
6	6	"Chosen"	Bradley Walsh	Wendy Riss Gatsiounis	November 21, 2013	1.81
7	7	"Left Behind"	Jeremiah Chechik	Drew Lindo	December 5, 2013	1.66
8	8	"Fated"	Fred Gerber	Laurie McCarthy	December 12, 2013	1.86
9	9	"For King and Country"	Helen Shaver	Story by : Alan McCullough; Teleplay by : Alan McCullough & Edgar Lyall	January 23, 2014	1.74
10	10	"Sacrifice"	Rachel Talalay	P. K. Simonds & Daniel Sinclair	January 30, 2014	1.62
11	11	"Inquisition"	Mike Rohl	Doris Egan	February 6, 2014	1.64
12	12	"Royal Blood"	Holly Dale	Story by : Wendy Riss Gatsiounis; Teleplay by : Alan McCullough	February 27, 2014	1.32
13	13	"The Consummation"	Fred Gerber	Laurie McCarthy	March 6, 2014	1.75
14	14	"Dirty Laundry"	Norma Bailey	Story by : Drew Lindo; Teleplay by : Edgar Lyall	March 13, 2014	1.48
15	15	"The Darkness"	Steve DiMarco	Charlie Craig	March 20, 2014	1.61
16	16	"Monsters"	Jeff Renfroe	Drew Lindo & Wendy Riss Gatsiounis	March 27, 2014	1.40
17	17	"Liege Lord"	Allan Kroeker	Doris Egan	April 10, 2014	1.23
18	18	"No Exit"	Mike Rohl	Hannah Schneider	April 17, 2014	1.39
19	19	"Toy Soldiers"	Chris Grismer	Mike Herro & David Strauss	April 24, 2014	1.35
20	20	"Higher Ground"	Sudz Sutherland	Story by : David Babcock & Daniel Sinclair; Teleplay by : Alan McCullough	May 1, 2014	1.42
21	21	"Long Live the King"	Jeremiah Chechik	Wendy Riss Gatsiounis & Drew Lindo	May 8, 2014	1.34
22	22	"Slaughter of Innocence"	David Frazee	Doris Egan & Laurie McCarthy	May 15, 2014	1.24

=== Season 2 (2014–15) ===
No. overall	No. in season	Title	Directed by	Written by	Original release date	US viewers (millions)
23	1	"The Plague"	Fred Gerber	Laurie McCarthy	October 2, 2014	1.01
24	2	"Drawn and Quartered"	Fred Gerber	Wendy Riss Gatsiounis & Drew Lindo	October 9, 2014	1.09
25	3	"Coronation"	Holly Dale	Harley Peyton	October 16, 2014	1.27
26	4	"The Lamb and the Slaughter"	Sudz Sutherland	Laurie McCarthy & Adele Lim	October 23, 2014	1.26
27	5	"Blood for Blood"	Norma Bailey	P.K. Simonds & Nancy Won	October 30, 2014	1.23
28	6	"Three Queens"	Steve DiMarco	Doris Egan	November 6, 2014	1.33
29	7	"The Prince of the Blood"	Deborah Chow	Drew Lindo & Wendy Riss Gatsiounis	November 13, 2014	1.19
30	8	"Terror of the Faithful"	Charles Binamé	Adele Lim & Melody Fox	November 20, 2014	1.10
31	9	"Acts of War"	Fred Gerber	Laurie McCarthy & Nancy Won	December 4, 2014	1.22
32	10	"Mercy"	Rich Newey	Wendy Riss Gatsiounis & Drew Lindo	December 11, 2014	1.42
33	11	"Getaway"	Lynne Stopkewich	Daniel Sinclair	January 22, 2015	1.16
34	12	"Banished"	Larysa Kondracki	Chelsey Lora	January 29, 2015	1.02
35	13	"Sins of the Past"	Deborah Chow	Doris Egan & Melody Fox	February 5, 2015	0.97
36	14	"The End of the Mourning"	Nathaniel Goodman	Laurie McCarthy & Nancy Won	February 12, 2015	1.03
37	15	"Forbidden"	Charles Binamé	Laurie McCarthy & Nancy Won	February 19, 2015	1.03
38	16	"Tasting Revenge"	Lee Rose	P. K. Simonds & Drew Lindo	March 12, 2015	0.96
39	17	"Tempting Fate"	Sudz Sutherland	Lisa Randolph	March 19, 2015	1.09
40	18	"Reversal of Fortune"	Anne Wheeler	Drew Lindo & Wendy Riss Gatsiounis	April 16, 2015	1.01
41	19	"Abandoned"	Deborah Chow	Nancy Won & Robert Doty	April 23, 2015	0.82
42	20	"Fugitive"	Norma Bailey	Doris Egan & Daniel Sinclair	April 30, 2015	0.84
43	21	"The Siege"	Andy Mikita	Adele Lim & Lisa Randolph	May 7, 2015	0.97
44	22	"Burn"	Fred Gerber	Laurie McCarthy & Nancy Won	May 14, 2015	0.83

=== Season 3 (2015–16) ===
No. overall	No. in season	Title	Directed by	Written by	Original release date	US viewers (millions)
45	1	"Three Queens, Two Tigers"	Holly Dale	Laurie McCarthy	October 9, 2015	0.95
46	2	"Betrothed"	Fred Gerber	Lisa Randolph	October 16, 2015	1.00
47	3	"Extreme Measures"	Holly Dale	Drew Lindo & Wendy Riss	October 23, 2015	0.90
48	4	"The Price"	Nathaniel Goodman	April Blair & Robert Doty	November 6, 2015	0.94
49	5	"In a Clearing"	Deborah Chow	Shannon Goss	November 13, 2015	1.03
50	6	"Fight or Flight"	Charles Binamé	Lisa Randolph	November 20, 2015	1.09
51	7	"The Hound and the Hare"	Anne Wheeler	Bo Yeon Kim & Erika Lippoldt	December 4, 2015	1.04
52	8	"Our Undoing"	Lee Rose	Gretchen J. Berg & Aaron Harberts	January 8, 2016	1.10
53	9	"Wedlock"	Norma Bailey	Wendy Riss & Drew Lindo	January 15, 2016	1.10
54	10	"Bruises that Lie"	Megan Follows	P.K. Simmons	January 22, 2016	1.24
55	11	"Succession"	Charles Binamé	April Blair	April 25, 2016	0.92
56	12	"No Way Out"	Fred Gerber	Wendy Riss Gatsiounis	May 2, 2016	0.96
57	13	"Strange Bedfellows"	Norma Bailey	Shannon Goss	May 9, 2016	0.78
58	14	"To the Death"	Michael McGowan	Lily Sparks	May 16, 2016	0.76
59	15	"Safe Passage"	Stuart Gillard	Drew Lindo	May 23, 2016	0.95
60	16	"Clans"	Fred Gerber	Gretchen J. Berg & Aaron Harberts	June 6, 2016	0.96
61	17	"Intruders"	Lee Rose	April Blair & Drew Lindo	June 13, 2016	0.81
62	18	"Spiders in a Jar"	Deborah Chow	Laurie McCarthy	June 20, 2016	0.93

=== Season 4 (2017) ===
No. overall	No. in season	Title	Directed by	Written by	Original release date	US viewers (millions)
63	1	"With Friends Like These..."	Stuart Gillard	Wendy Riss Gatsiounis & Drew Lindo	February 10, 2017	0.78
64	2	"A Grain of Deception"	Fred Gerber	Patti Carr & Lara Olsen	February 17, 2017	0.67
65	3	"Leaps of Faith"	Charles Binamé	April Blair & Laurie McCarthy	February 24, 2017	0.59
66	4	"Playing with Fire"	Fred Gerber	John J. Sakmar & Kenny Lenhart	March 3, 2017	0.64
67	5	"Highland Games"	Michael McGowan	Robert Doty	March 17, 2017	0.76
68	6	"Love & Death"	Megan Follows	Drew Lindo & Wendy Riss Gatsiounis	March 24, 2017	0.75
69	7	"Hanging Swords"	Lee Rose	Chris Atwood & Kamran Pasha	March 31, 2017	0.66
70	8	"Uncharted Waters"	Fred Gerber	Bo Yeon Kim & Erika Lippoldt	April 7, 2017	0.71
71	9	"Pulling Strings"	Andy Mikita	April Blair & Laurie McCarthy	April 14, 2017	0.63
72	10	"A Better Man"	Dawn Wilkinson	John J. Sakmar & Kenny Lenhart	April 28, 2017	0.68
73	11	"Dead of Night"	Deborah Chow	Wendy Riss Gatsiounis & Drew Lindo	May 5, 2017	0.69
74	12	"The Shakedown"	Norma Bailey	Patti Carr & Lara Olsen	May 12, 2017	0.76
75	13	"Coup de Grace"	Megan Follows	John J. Sakmar & Kerry Lenhart	May 19, 2017	0.71
76	14	"A Bride, A Box, A Body"	Andy Mikita	April Blair & Robert D. Doty	June 2, 2017	0.74
77	15	"Blood in the Water"	Charles Binamé	Drew Lindo & Wendy Riss Gatsiounis	June 9, 2017	0.67
78	16	"All it Cost Her..."	Holly Dale	April Blair & Laurie McCarthy	June 16, 2017	0.75

== Ratings ==
Reign : U.S. viewers per episode (millions)

Season	Episode number																					
Season	1	2	3	4	5	6	7	8	9	10	11	12	13	14	15	16	17	18	19	20	21	22
1	1.98	1.83	1.57	1.64	1.73	1.81	1.66	1.86	1.74	1.62	1.64	1.32	1.75	1.48	1.61	1.40	1.23	1.39	1.35	1.42	1.34	1.24
2	1.01	1.09	1.27	1.26	1.23	1.33	1.19	1.10	1.22	1.42	1.16	1.02	0.97	1.03	1.03	0.96	1.09	1.01	0.82	0.84	0.97	0.83
3	0.95	1.00	0.90	0.94	1.03	1.09	1.04	1.10	1.10	1.24	0.92	0.96	0.78	0.76	0.95	0.96	0.81	0.93	–			
4	0.78	0.67	0.59	0.64	0.76	0.75	0.66	0.71	0.63	0.68	0.69	0.76	0.71	0.74	0.67	0.75	–					

Audience measurement performed by Nielsen Media Research
