= Janessa =

Janessa, Janesa or Jenessa may refer to:

- Janesa Barrett, American musician
- Janessa a synonym of the beetle genus Languria
- Jenessa Grant, Canadian actress
