= Golden Maple Awards =

Canadian acting award

- Presented by: ACISE-LA
- First award: July 1, 2015

The Golden Maple Awards were a short-lived annual award presentation coordinated by the Academy of Canadians in Sports and Entertainment – Los Angeles (ACISE-LA) to recognize Canadian actors performing in television shows broadcast in the United States. The ACISE-LA was a non-profit organisation, with members consisting of acting and directing talent, Canadian Olympians, and Canadian athletes who played for established sports franchises. The first awards ceremony was held on July 1, 2015. The final award ceremony was held on July 1, 2016.

== 2015 Awards ==
References: Winners highlighted in bold

=== Best Actor in a TV Series Broadcast in the U.S. ===
- **Brandon Jay McLaren** – Graceland
- Adam Copeland – Haven
- Alexander Ludwig – Vikings
- Greyston Holt – Bitten
- Jonathan Keltz – Reign
- Lyriq Bent – The Book of Negroes
- Torrance Coombs – Reign

=== Best Actress in a TV Series Broadcast in the U.S. ===
- **Amanda Crew** – Silicon Valley
- Anna Silk – Lost Girl
- Caroline Dhavernas – Hannibal
- Jessalyn Gilsig – Vikings
- Katheryn Winnick – Vikings
- Kathleen Robertson – Murder in the First
- Missy Peregrym – Rookie Blue

=== Newcomer of the Year in a TV Series Broadcast in the U.S. ===
- **Emily Hampshire** – 12 Monkeys and Schitt's Creek
- **Meaghan Rath** – New Girl
- Brooke Wexler – Richie Rich
- Italia Ricci – Chasing Life
- Shailyn Pierre-Dixon – The Book of Negroes

== 2016 Awards ==
References: Winners highlighted in bold

=== Best Actor in a TV Series Broadcast in the U.S. ===
- **Ricky Mabe** – Gigi Does It
- Ben Hollingsworth – Code Black
- Brandon Jay McLaren – Graceland
- Byron Mann –Hell on Wheels
- Christopher Heyerdahl – Hell on Wheels
- David Sutcliffe – Proof
- Giacomo Gianniotti – Grey's Anatomy
- Jonathan Keltz – Reign

=== Best Actress in a TV Series Broadcast in the U.S. ===
- **Natalie Brown** – The Strain
- Amanda Crew – Silicon Valley
- Britne Oldford – Hunters
- Emily Hampshire – 12 Monkeys
- Emily Hampshire – Schitt's Creek
- Erin Karpluk – The Riftworld Chronicles
- Laura Vandervoort – Bitten
- Lindy Booth – The Librarians

=== Newcomer of the Year in a TV Series Broadcast in the U.S. ===
- **Amanda Crew** – Silicon Valley
- Ennis Esmer – Red Oaks
- Christopher Heyerdahl – Hell on Wheels
- Giacomo Gianniotti – Grey's Anatomy
- Gregory Smith – Rookie Blue

== See also ==
- Canadian television awards
