= Alexandra Ordolis =

Greek-Canadian actress

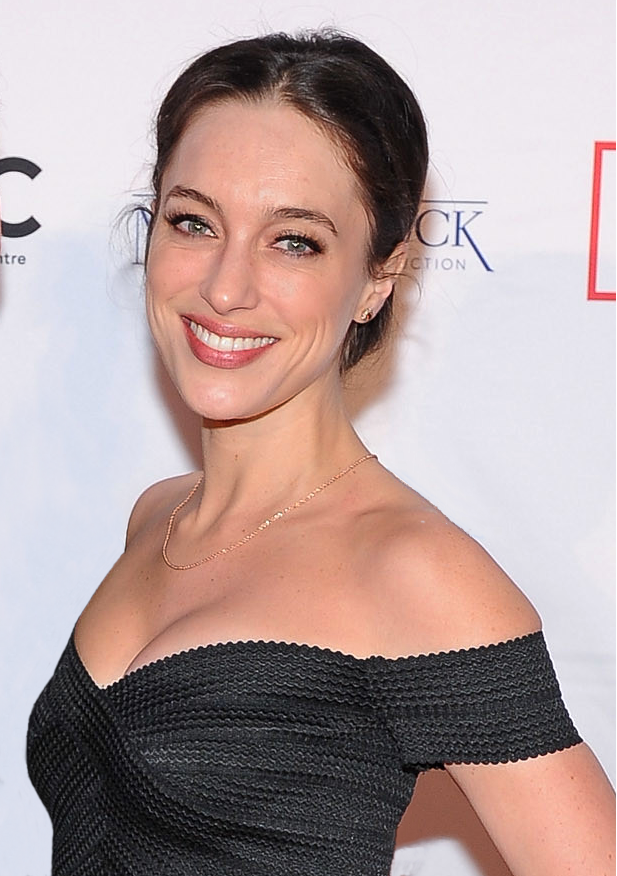
- Actors Conservatory alumni Alexandra Ordolis at the 2016 CFC Annual Gala & Auction
- Born: July 9, 1986 (age 38); Athens, Greece
- Occupation: Actress
- Years active: 2009–present

Alexandra Ordolis (born July 9, 1986) is a Greek-Canadian actress having had roles as Sister Delphine on the 2015 TV series Reign, Shelly in The Mist (2017), Ollie in Shadowhunters: The Mortal Instruments (2018) and Caro in Nurses (Canadian TV series) 2020.

== Early life ==
Ordolis was born in Athens, Greece to a Greek father and a British mother. She lived in Athens for her first few years, then moved to Montreal and spent most of her childhood there. She attended McGill University, graduating in 2007 with a degree in English and philosophy. She then attended the National Theatre School of Canada in Montreal between 2008 and 2011, then the CFC Actors Conservatory from 2012 to 2013. She achieved Level 8 in ballet at the Royal Academy Of Dancing.

== Career ==
Ordolis first appeared on screen in 2009 in the movie Recon 2023: The Gauda Prime Conspiracy as a cute army girl. In 2010 she played Anna Bell Johnson in The Will: Family Secrets Revealed, then in Blue Mountain State in 2011. In 2012 Alexandra made an appearance in the documentary Flight of the Butterflies as a female volunteer.

Ordolis secured many brief appearances in short films and TV series episodes during 2014 before landing a reoccurring role as Delphine in Reign, opposite Adelaide Kane and Megan Follows, and Justine in 19-2 in 2015. She became a regular cast member of Shadowhunters: The Mortal Instruments in 2017, as well as starring alongside Alyssa Sutherland in The Mist as Shelley DeWitt for 7 episodes. In 2020, Ordolis played the lesbian lover Caro in Nurses (Canadian TV series).

== Personal life ==
Ordolis does yoga, and enjoys sports such as downhill skiing, cycling, and swimming.

== Filmography ==
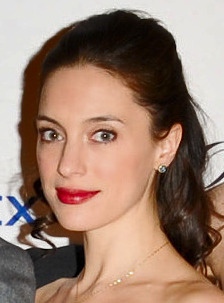
Alexandra Ordolis at the CFC Gala 2013

=== Film ===
Year	Title	Role	Notes
2009	Recon 2023: The Gauda Prime Conspiracy	Cute Army Girl	
2014	Collisions	Sarah	Short Film
2014	Stay with Me	Nurse Tanya	Short Film
2015	Showtime	?	Short Film
2016	Hard Close	Melissa	Short Film

=== Television ===
Year	Title	Role	Notes
2010	The Will: Family Secrets Revealed	Anna Bell Johnson	1 episode
2011	Blue Mountain State	Hot Girl	1 episode
2014	Being Human	Aidan's Girl	1 episode
2014	Helix	Blake	3 episodes
2014	Rookie Blue	Jen Luck	1 episode
2015	Reign	Delphine	12 episodes
2017	Dark Matter	Alicia Reynaud / Android AD	2 episodes
2017	Ransom	Jessica Ford	1 episode
2014 - 2017	19-2	Justine	9 episodes
2017	The Mist	Shelley DeWitt	7 episodes
2017-2018	Shadowhunters	Olivia 'Ollie' Wilson	11 episodes
2019	First Person	Diana	1 episode
2020	Nurses	Caro	7 episodes
