= An American Dream: The Education of William Bowman =

- Film poster
- Directed by: Ken Finkleman
- Written by: Ken Finkleman
- Produced by: Jason Tan
- Starring: Jake Croker
- Cinematography: Jason Tan
- Edited by: Susan Kramer
- Music by: Robert Carli
- Production company: Shaftesbury Films
- Distributed by: A71 Entertainment
- Release date: December 1, 2016 (Whistler)
- Running time: 90 minutes
- Country: Canada
- Language: English

An American Dream: The Education of William Bowman is a 2016 Canadian satirical film, written and directed by Ken Finkleman. Based on Candide, the film stars Jake Croker as William Bowman, a young man who tries his hand at various aspects of American life in the hopes of achieving the mythical American Dream.

The cast includes Diana Bentley, Shiloh Blondel, Jan Caruana, Precious Chong, Noah Davis, Laura de Carteret, Julian De Zotti, Lesley Faulkner, Eddie Guillaume, Jenessa Grant, David Huband, Karen Ivany, Dylan Kamm, Charlie Kerr, Jameson Kraemer, Ron Lea, James McDougall, Derek McGrath, Adrian Nguyen, Joe Pingue, William Poulin, John Ralston, Jessica Rose, Bea Santos, Elias Scoufaras, Teagan Vincze, Jason Weinberg, Lorna Wright and Kate Ziegler in supporting roles.

The film premiered in the Borsos Competition program at the 2016 Whistler Film Festival.

== Critical response ==
Norman Wilner of Now panned the film, writing that "It's smug and insufferable calculated jokes aimed at obvious targets, with one lazy idea piled on top of the last. This is the sort of movie that thinks scoring a gunfight with wacky banjo music will be hailed as original, or even daring." He concluded that "Finkleman's always been self-congratulatory, but with this one set up as the delirious fantasy of a heartland naif (Jake Croker) after he's laid out during a high school football game he's patting himself on the back so hard I'm surprised he didn't break both arms."

Barry Hertz of The Globe and Mail opined that "thanks to dead-in-the-water gags (the big, bad Wall Street firm is named World Domination Finance) and juvenile delivery, An American Dream makes a great case for why Canadians should be barred from even gently poking fun at our neighbour to the south."
