= Jenessa Grant =

Canadian actress

- Born: Felicity Jenessa Grant; Canada
- Occupation: Actress
- Years active: 2010–present

Jenessa Grant is a Canadian actress. She has played the characters Mud in Orphan Black, Ofsamuel in The Handmaid's Tale and Aylee in Reign. She also portrays Faith Seed in the video game Far Cry 5.

== Selected filmography ==
=== Film ===
Year	Title	Role	Notes
2016	An American Dream: The Education of William Bowman	Tally Pepper	

=== Television ===
Year	Title	Role	Notes
2013	Cracked	Isabelle Saunders	2 episodes
2013	Reign	Aylee	Main role; 8 episodes
2015	Grimm	Chloe Bennett	1 episode
2017	Ransom	Evie	Recurring role; 5 episodes
2017	Orphan Black	Mud	Recurring role; 5 episodes
2017-2019	The Handmaid's Tale	Ofsamuel/Dolores	Recurring role; 11 episodes
2019	Tin Star	Rosa	Recurring role; Season 2

=== Video games ===
Year	Title	Role	Notes
2018	Far Cry 5	Faith Seed	Voice and performance capture
