= Reign (TV series) =

American TV series

- Genre: Historical drama; Romantic drama
- Created by: Laurie McCarthy; Stephanie SenGupta
- Starring: Rossif Sutherland: Adelaide Kane; Megan Follows; Torrance Coombs; Toby Regbo; Jenessa Grant; Celina Sinden; Caitlin Stasey; Anna Popplewell; Alan van Sprang; Jonathan Keltz; Sean Teale; Craig Parker; Rose Williams; Rachel Skarsten; Charlie Carrick; Ben Geurens; Spencer MacPherson; Dan Jeannotte; Jonathan Goad; Will Kemp
- Opening theme: "Scotland" by The Lumineers
- Composer: Trevor Morris
- Countries of origin: United States; Canada (Note: The series was produced by a Toronto-based studio Whizbang Films.)
- Original language: English
- No. of seasons: 4
- No. of episodes: 78 (list of episodes)

Production
- Executive producers: Laurie McCarthy; Stephanie SenGupta; Brad Silberling; John Weber; Frank Siracusa
- Running time: 42 minutes
- Production companies: Joyful Girl Productions; Take 5 Productions; Whizbang Films; Warner Bros. Television; CBS Television Studios

Original release
- Network: The CW
- Release: October 17, 2013 – June 16, 2017

Reign is an historical romantic drama television series created by Laurie McCarthy and Stephanie SenGupta for The CW. Set in the late 16th century, the series revolves around the life of Mary, Queen of Scots, and her rise to power in the French court. The series stars Adelaide Kane as Queen Mary Stuart, alongside an ensemble cast. The series premiered on October 17, 2013, on The CW and concluded after four seasons on June 16, 2017.

The series was produced by Warner Bros. Television and CBS Television Studios, in association with Joyful Girl Productions, Take 5 Productions, and Toronto-based Whizbang Films. In February 2013, The CW ordered a pilot for a television series loosely based on Mary Stuart's life and largely favored fictionalized storylines than historical accuracy; Kane was cast in the lead role that same month. Filming primarily took place between Toronto and the Republic of Ireland.

== Premise ==
The first season opens in 1557, with fifteen-year-old Queen Mary Stuart living in a convent in France, but she is quickly returned to the castle where we learn she is awaiting her marriage to fifteen-year-old Crown Prince Francis, to whom she has been engaged since they were six. Mary has to contend with changing politics and power plays, as well as her burgeoning feelings for and the romantic attentions of Francis' bastard half-brother, Bash. Francis' mother, Catherine de' Medici, secretly tries to prevent the marriage following Nostradamus’ confidential prediction that the marriage will lead to Francis' death. The series also follows the affairs of Mary's Scottish handmaidens Lady Kenna Livingston, Lady Aylee Seton, Lady Lola Fleming and Lady Greer Norwood (based on "the Four Lady Marys"), who are searching for noble husbands of their own at French Court.

The second season opens after the death of King Henry II and follows the rise of Francis and Mary as King and Queen of France and Scotland. Together they have to balance their marriage with their roles as monarchs, and deal with the rising religious conflict between Catholics and Protestants, as well as the ambitions of the rival House of Bourbon for the throne of France.

The third season follows King Francis' declining health and his death partway through the season, leaving Queen Mary a widow and struggling to find new footing since she's no longer bound to France as its ruler. Francis' brother Charles is crowned the new under-aged king, with Queen Catherine as regent. The third season also introduces the court of Queen Elizabeth I of England, who plots against her own distant cousin Queen Mary, fends off marital prospects, and deals with her secret love affair with Lord Robert Dudley.

The fourth and final season, opening in 1563 and ending in 1587, has Queen Mary returned to Scotland as its rightful ruler and trying to regain power in her homeland. She has to manage her allies, such as her bastard older half-brother James Stewart and the outspoken Lord Bothwell, as well as her enemies such as the Protestant preacher John Knox. Tensions mount between Queen Mary and her own cousin Queen Elizabeth I, with Queen Mary marrying Lord Darnley, an English Catholic claimant to the English throne, in the hopes of taking England. In France, Catherine has to protect her mentally damaged son, King Charles IX, from the ambitions of her eldest daughter Queen Leeza of Spain, and their cunning teenage youngest brother, Crown Prince Henry.

== Series overview ==
Season	Episodes	Originally released	
Season	Episodes	First released	Last released
1	22	October 17, 2013	May 15, 2014
2	22	October 2, 2014	May 14, 2015
3	18	October 9, 2015	June 20, 2016
4	16	February 10, 2017	June 16, 2017

== Cast and characters ==
=== Main ===
Actor	Character	Seasons			
Actor	Character	1	2	3	4
Adelaide Kane	Mary, Queen of Scots	Main	Main	Main	Main
Megan Follows	Catherine de' Medici	Main	Main	Main	Main
Torrance Coombs	Sebastian "Bash" de Poiters	Main	Main	Main	
Toby Regbo	Francis II of France	Main	Main	Main	Guest
Jenessa Grant	Lady Aylee	Main			
Caitlin Stasey	Lady Kenna	Main	Main		
Anna Popplewell	Lady Lola	Main	Main	Main	
Celina Sinden	Lady Greer	Main	Main	Main	Main
Alan van Sprang	Henry II of France	Main	Recurring		
Jonathan Keltz	Leith Bayard	Recurring	Main	Main	Main
Sean Teale	Louis, Prince of Condé		Main		
Craig Parker	Stéphane Narcisse		Main	Main	Main
Rose Williams	Claude of France		Main	Main	Main
Rachel Skarsten	Elizabeth I of England		Guest	Main	Main
Charlie Carrick	Robert Dudley			Main	
Ben Geurens	Gideon Blackburn			Main	Main
Peter DaCunha	Charles IX of France	Recurring	Recurring		
Spencer MacPherson	Charles IX of France			Recurring	Main
Joe Doyle	James Stewart	Guest			
Dan Jeannotte	James Stewart			Recurring	Main
Jonathan Goad	John Knox			Recurring	Main
Will Kemp	Henry Stuart, Lord Darnley				Main

== Production ==
=== Conception ===
In February 2013, The CW announced its order of a pilot for a TV series based on the life of Mary, Queen of Scots, created by Stephanie Sengupta and Laurie McCarthy, and produced by CBS Studios. Part of the reason McCarthy chose Mary Stuart as the subject is because of her life history and multiple husbands, which makes her story "sexier". The pilot was directed by Brad Silberling, with Sengupta and McCarthy as the writers and executive directors; Sengupta left the team in May 2013, leaving Laurie McCarthy as the sole showrunner. On February 9, 2013, it was announced that Australian actress Adelaide Kane would be playing the main character.

In interviews preceding the premiere, showrunner McCarthy described the show as deliberately taking liberties with history, and that it's more "entertainment" than history, while actress Anna Popplewell referred to the show as "fantasy history", exploring the characters in hypothetical situations. Actress Megan Follows described the show as "24 for the pre-Renaissance", as the show tends to extend historical events over a longer period of time. McCarthy added that the show is designed to be interesting to a contemporary audience, so viewers who aren't familiar with history will be able to watch and relate to the characters. Among the creative choices is the use of modern music in the show soundtrack, and its costumes. The show's costumes are designed by Meredith Markworth-Pollack, who worked on the CW's other shows Hart of Dixie and Gossip Girl, who created different looks for Mary and her ladies, each to complement their differing personalities. The ladies: Lola, Kenna, Greer, and Aylee, are loosely based on Mary Beaton, Mary Seton, Mary Fleming, and Mary Livingston who were ladies-in-waiting to Mary, Queen of Scots.

=== Casting ===
Kane auditioned when she was filming a recurring role on the third season of MTV TV series Teen Wolf. When Kane got the part, the Teen Wolf writers wrote her character off the show. Kane is part Scottish on both her mother and father's sides, and is possibly a descendant of the real Mary, Queen of Scots, through her mother. Kane did research on the historical Mary Stuart in preparing for the role. Toby Regbo was cast as Dauphin Francis before March 1, 2013, and British newcomer Celina Sinden was cast as Mary's lady-in-waiting Greer on that date. Torrance Coombs was announced as having been cast as Sebastian, one of the leading characters, in March 2013. Sebastian is an original character created for the show, so Coombs didn't have as much research in preparation for the role, though he faced the challenge of changing his performance from that in The Tudors, another historical TV series he'd been involved in. Alan Van Sprang, who was cast as Henry II of France, modeled his performance after Bill Clinton. In November 2013, Amy Brenneman was announced as having been cast as Mary Stuart's mother, Mary de Guise, a role that initially went to Brenneman's Private Practice co-star Kate Walsh, who was unable to commit due to conflicting filming commitments. On March 10, 2015, it was announced that Rachel Skarsten has been cast as Queen Elizabeth, a role that debuted in finale of season two and become a regular in season three. Showrunner McCarthy described the addition of Elizabeth as expanding the scope of the series, and that she would be part of season three's focus on the show's three queens.

=== Filming ===
A large part of the filming for the first season took place in Toronto and the Republic of Ireland. The third and fourth seasons were also largely filmed in Toronto. Rockwood Conservation Area near Guelph, Ontario, and Parkwood Estate in Oshawa, Ontario, have also been used to mimic 16th-century Scotland for the show's production.

Most of the other interior scenes, including bedchambers, the Great Hall, and the Throne Room, were filmed in vast sets primarily at Cinespace Film Studios' Kipling Avenue facility.

=== Costumes ===
Reign's lead costume designer is Meredith Markworth-Pollack. According to the Observer, Reign's custom blend of contemporary and historical fashion had mixed reviews from the show's audience. The show did not feature historically accurate clothing, however, was well-received amongst younger audience members—particularly young fashion bloggers—who found the aesthetics of the show's costume-line pleasing. In the same article, Markworth-Pollack explains that there was a correspondence to the show's overall tone as seasons progressed. The costumes went from pretty, light fabrics befitting of young ladies to dark, more mature designs as Mary got older. Most of the costumes at the beginning of Reign's production were rentals found from different places in Europe, Los Angeles, and off-the-rack thrift stores. Once the show gained more traction, Markworth-Pollack was receiving vintage fabrics to work with from all over the world.

=== Music ===
Executive producer Brad Silberling knew someone who worked with the American folk rock band The Lumineers during the development period of "Scotland", the series opening theme song. In an interview about the song, the lead singer of the band, Wesley Schultz, commented, "The song also was special to us because it had this beautiful driving rhythm that Jer [Jeremiah Fraites] played that reminded us of battle drums, like something out of Braveheart – hence the strange name – Scotland,". Aside from the show's theme song which is aired for all four seasons, The Lumineers' have a second song called "Charlie Boy" which is also featured in the pilot of the first season.

In an exclusive interview with the show's music supervisor, Madonna Wade Reed, she discusses how The Lumineers set the music tone of the show. Although the band did not create an original score for the show, Wade Reed explains that they used pre-existing songs throughout the show like the Vitamin String Quartet's cover of “Stubborn Love" in order to maintain that connection.

=== Editing for sexual content ===
The show's pilot was distributed on May 20, 2013, to advertisers and critics for promotion and to generate hype. The pilot was edited before its final airing on October 13, trimming the sexual content of the scene where Kenna masturbates after witnessing a bedding ceremony. A later episode of the season, 1.13 "The Consummation", has two versions: an on-air cut for television broadcast, and an online streaming version with additional sexual content that was made available on the CW's website a few hours later. This action was criticized by the Parents Television Council for putting sexual content online "where presumably children will be able to watch them with no rating or blocking capability".

== Broadcasts ==
Reign was announced on The CW's 2013 autumn line-up on May 10, 2013, placing it in the Thursday timeslot following The Vampire Diaries, its biggest hit in young women demographic. The show had its series premiere on October 17, 2013, in the U.S. In Canada, the series airs a day earlier on M3, in simulcast with The CW on CTV Two, and in reruns on E! Canada. Beginning with season three, the show moved to the latter network. On December 7, 2016, it was announced that Reign would end after its fourth and final season.

In New Zealand, Prime premiered the show Thursdays at 9:30 pm, starting November 21, 2013. In Australia, Reign was originally scheduled to premiere on Eleven, but premiered on Fox8 on August 5, 2014. In Ireland the show broadcasts in the early mornings on RTÉ2 each Thursday at 02:15. The first two seasons of Reign are available for online streaming on Netflix in the UK and Ireland. New episodes from Season 3 onwards are uploaded weekly to Netflix in the United Kingdom as the exclusive broadcaster hours after they air in the US, but not Ireland where they are exclusive to RTÉ until the season finishes airing.

All four seasons are available for streaming on Netflix in the Middle East and a great part of Europe, and on Amazon Prime in the US. All four seasons are no longer available on Netflix in the UK and departed Netflix US on September 5, 2022.

== Critical response ==
=== Reception ===
Response to the show was mixed, with various critics highlighting the show's focus on romance and teenage drama instead of historical accuracy. A number of reviewers compared it to Gossip Girl, with similar emphasis on fashion, drama, and soap opera antics. The review of the pilot by The New York Times described Reign a strong candidate as a "camp classic", calling it fun and acknowledging its historical inaccuracies. The reviewer of The A.V. Club described the show as more "an alternate-universe fanfiction than anything pretending to approach history", calling the show camp and fun. The Miami Herald described the show's opening episodes as "surprisingly entertaining", with Adelaide Kane's portrayal of Mary as "a teenager with a dawning realization that her royal caprices can have unexpectedly grim consequences offers an interesting take on the traditional coming-of-age story". The review of Flavorwire described the show as "fantastical princess wish-fulfilment", a guilty pleasure that is relaxing to watch, and that its historical inaccuracy is to its advantage: "There is something about abandoning all pretense of authenticity that gives this story a lightness it badly needs; dead-seriousness just isn't something that plays all that well at the moment." Community Voices highlighted Reign as an interesting departure from The CW's other shows, but described it as stuck in a rut, making it difficult to sustain a show that's "built on a binary premise: either Mary and Francis are coming together or they are drifting apart." A review by a The Los Angeles Times critic was more critical, saying that the "sexed-up version of high school with horses" show "does not deserve" its main character, who is described as a "The Princess Diaries knock-off", but acknowledged that the show is self-aware of its position as a guilty pleasure. USA Today is also critical, describing the show as anachronistic and "dumbing down" history for the sake of entertainment.

=== Themes in Gender ===
Women in Power

While Reign mainly focuses on six female characters throughout the series, the show primarily hones in on three particular monarch figures that existed in real life. Reign follows the fictional journey of young Mary Stuart, based on the real reigning monarch, Mary, Queen of Scots, who ruled Scotland for 25 years in the mid 16th century. Throughout the course of the series, Mary is seen in and out of conflict with Catherine de Medici, the Dowager Queen of France who is also Mary's mother-in-law; they act as the driving source of conflict for the majority of the show up until season 3 when the show features an additional rendition of Queen Elizabeth I played by Rachel Skarsten. Both Queen Mary and Queen Elizabeth take center stage for the narrative during the latter half of the series up until its cancellation in 2017--facing each other as rivals in a political setting.
The show illustrates these characters struggling to balance personal and political endeavors when in a position of power. It is praised by some entertainment media outlets for depicting powerful, three-dimensional women as they barrel head first into a world typically run by men.

Women's Sexuality

In light of Kenna's masturbation scene in Reign's pilot, many entertainment media outlets and critics were quick to pick up a stance on whether it was appropriate to illustrate a young woman exploring her sexuality on network television. There were two different versions of the pilot released during Reign's first week of airing--an on-air cut that met broadcast standards which premiered Thursday, October 17, 2013, and a director's cut published on CW's website the morning after on Friday, October 18, 2013. The same day of the television release, an interview with the showrunner, Laurie McCarthy, was published discussing the conception, production, and reception of the masturbation scene. She comments that masturbation is commonplace and a healthy conversation for parents to have with their young adults. In 2014, an interview with Kenna's actress, Caitlin Stasey, was published regarding the importance of depicting female sexuality on television and a woman's sexual independence.

=== Awards and nominations ===
Year	Award	Category	Recipient(s)	Result	Refs
2014	Hollywood Post Alliance Awards	Outstanding Color Grading – Television	"Pilot"; David Cole – Modern VideoFilm	Won	
2014	The Joey Awards	Young Actress age 9 or younger in a TV Series Drama or Comedy Guest Starring or Principal Role	Vanessa Carter	Nominated	
2014	Teen Choice Awards	Choice TV: Breakout Show	Reign	Nominated	
2014	Teen Choice Awards	Choice TV: Female Breakout Star	Adelaide Kane	Nominated	
2014	Teen Choice Awards	Choice TV: Male Breakout Star	Toby Regbo	Nominated	
2014	Monte-Carlo Television Festival	Outstanding Actor in a Drama Series	Torrance Coombs	Nominated	
2014	Monte-Carlo Television Festival	Outstanding Actress in a Drama Series	Adelaide Kane	Nominated	
2014	People's Choice Awards	Favorite New TV Drama	Reign	Won	
2015	Golden Maple Awards	Best Actor in a TV series broadcast in US	Torrance Coombs & Jonathan Keltz	Nominated	
2015	Canadian Screen Awards	Best Achievement in Make-Up	"Consummation"; Jenny Arbour, Linda Preston	Nominated	
2015	Canadian Screen Awards	Shaw Media Award for Best Performance by an Actress in a Continuing Leading Dramatic Role	Megan Follows	Nominated	
2016	Canadian Screen Awards	Best Production Design or Art Direction in a Fiction Program or Series	"Acts of War"; Phillip Barker, Robert Hepburn, Brad Milburn	Nominated	
2016	Canadian Screen Awards	Shaw Media Award for Best Performance by an Actress in a Continuing Leading Dramatic Role	"Three Queens"; Megan Follows	Nominated	

=== Ratings ===
Viewership and ratings per season of Reign
Season	Timeslot (ET)	Episodes	First aired		Last aired		TV season	Viewership rank	Avg. viewers (millions)	18–49 rank	Avg. 18–49 rating
Season	Timeslot (ET)	Episodes	Date	Viewers (millions)	Date	Viewers (millions)	TV season	Viewership rank	Avg. viewers (millions)	18–49 rank	Avg. 18–49 rating
1	Thursday 9:00 pm	22	October 17, 2013	1.98	May 15, 2014	1.24	2013–14	158	1.94	TBD	0.9/3
2	Thursday 9:00 pm	22	October 2, 2014	1.01	May 14, 2015	0.83	2014–15	164	1.72	TBD	0.7/2
3	Friday 8:00 pm (1–10); Monday 8:00 pm (11–18)	18	October 9, 2015	0.95	June 20, 2016	0.93	2015–16	186	0.97	TBD	0.5/2
4	Friday 9:00 pm	16	February 10, 2017	0.78	June 16, 2017	0.75	2016–17	161	1.10	TBD	TBD

== Home media releases ==
Complete season	DVD/Blu-ray release dates			Additional info
Complete season	Region 1/A	Region 2/B	Region 4/C	Additional info
1	September 23, 2014	—N/a	January 14, 2015	Deleted scenes Two featurettes: – The Making of a Queen – The Authenticity of Reign: Recreating the 16th Century
2	October 6, 2015	—N/a	October 7, 2015	Deleted scenes Featurette: Playing by Her Rules: A Day on Set with a Queen and Her Court
3	September 27, 2016	—N/a	TBA	4-disc set No additional featurette
4	October 10, 2017	TBA	TBA	No special features

== Other media ==
=== Novels ===
Novels based on the series authored by Lily Blake have been published by Little, Brown Books for Young Readers.

Title	Published	Type	ISBN
Darkness Rises	May 20, 2014	Digital Short Story	ISBN 978-0-316-29611-3
The Prophecy	September 23, 2014	Novel	ISBN 978-0-316-33459-4
The Haunting	December 9, 2014	E-Novella	ISBN 978-0-316-33455-6
Hysteria	May 12, 2015	Novel	ISBN 978-0-316-33462-4
