= Torrance Coombs =

Canadian actor (born 1983)

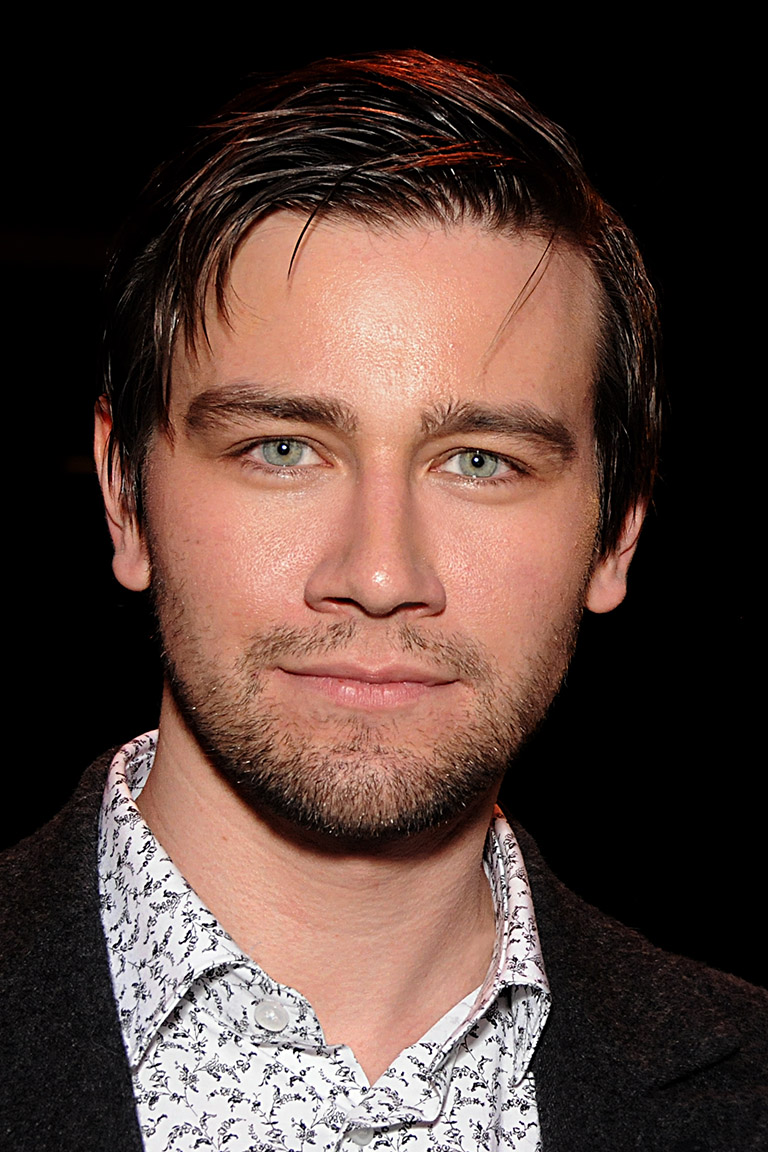
- Coombs in 2014
- Born: June 14, 1983 (age 43); Vancouver, British Columbia, Canada
- Occupation: Actor
- Years active: 2005–present
- Spouse: Alyssa Campanella (m. 2016; div. 2019)
- Website: www.torrancecoombs.com

Torrance Coombs (born June 14, 1983) is a Canadian actor. He is perhaps best known for his roles as Thomas Culpepper in The Tudors (2007–2010), Sebastian "Bash" de Poitiers - the illegitimate son of King Henry II of France and his chief mistress Diane de Poitiers - in Reign (2013–2017), and Declan in The Originals.

== Early life and education ==
Coombs was born and raised in Vancouver, British Columbia, Canada. He joined the school choir to better express himself and was soon cast in the role of Rum Tum Tugger in the musical play Cats. He rented a video of Elvis Presley in concert to help prepare for the role. Coombs holds a dual citizenship to both Canada and the United States.

He continued to do theatre roles throughout high school at University Hill Secondary School and eventually enrolled in the acting program at the University of British Columbia in Vancouver.

== Career ==
=== Theatre ===
Coombs has appeared in productions at Bard on the Beach, an annual professional Shakespeare festival held in Vancouver; he has also appeared in the musical A Little Night Music.

=== Television ===
His first starring role on television was as John Doe in the 2008 CBC comedy series jPod, based on the novel of the same name by Douglas Coupland. Coombs also appeared as Lance Corporal C. Sellers in a 2009 episode of the television series Battlestar Galactica.

In 2010, Coombs appeared in a recurring role as Thomas Culpeper in the television series The Tudors, and in CBC's Heartland as Chase Powers. In 2011, he co-starred as Sam Besht as in the Hulu drama series Endgame.

On March 11, 2013, it was announced that Coombs had been cast in a lead role as Sebastian in the CW period drama series Reign. He was nominated for Outstanding Actor in a Drama TV Series at the 2014 Monte-Carlo Television Festival for his role in Reign. In early 2016, Coombs chose to depart from Reign as a series regular at the end of the third season, with the possibility to return as a guest star in future episodes.

In March 2016, it was announced that Coombs would star as a series regular for Shonda Rimes' new series Still Star-Crossed on ABC.

In August 2017, it was announced that Coombs would star in a recurring role in the final season of The Originals.

=== Film ===
In 2009 he starred as Sam Matheson in the short film The Familiar, and appeared as PJ in the short film Good Image Media. In 2012, he starred in the psychological thriller Liars All.

== Personal life ==
Coombs began dating Miss USA 2011 Alyssa Campanella in 2010. On June 12, 2015 it was announced that they were engaged. On 2 April 2016, the couple got married in Santa Ynez, California. In April 2019, the couple announced their separation and got divorced that same year.

== Filmography ==
=== Film ===
Year	Film	Role	Notes
2005	Judy's Comeuppance	Paramedic #2	Short film
2009	The Familiar	Sam Matheson	Short film Nominated—Leo Award for Best Performance by a Male in a Short Drama
2009	Good Image Media	PJ	Short film
2011	Afghan Luke	Private Davey	
2013	Kill for Me	Cameron	Direct-to-video
2013	Liars All	Dennis	
2014	Drawing Home	Kit Paley	
2015	Eadweard	Bell	
2016	The Last Heist	Paul	
2025	Little Angels	Richard Dragon	
2025	The Wrong Paris	Carl	

=== Television ===
Year	Title	Role	Notes
2007	Supernatural	Mitch	Episode: "Hollywood Babylon"
2008	jPod	John Doe	Main role; 13 episodes
2009	Battlestar Galactica	Lance Corporal C. Sellers	Episode: "Someone to Watch Over Me"
2010–2012	Heartland	Chase Powers	Recurring role; 10 episodes
2010	The Tudors	Thomas Culpeper	5 episodes
2011	Endgame	Sam Besht	Main role; 13 episodes
2011	Haven	Kyle Hopkins	Episode: "Sins of the Fathers"
2011	Killer Mountain	Chance	Television film
2013–2016	Reign	Sebastian "Bash" de Poitiers	Main role (seasons 1–3; 62 episodes); Nominated – 2014 Monte-Carlo Television Festival for Outstanding Actor in a Drama TV Series; Nominated – 2014 Teen Choice Awards for Breakout Show; Nominated – 2015 Golden Maple Award for Best Actor in a TV series broadcasted in the U.S.
2017	Still Star-Crossed	Count Paris	Main role; 7 episodes
2018	The Originals	Declan	Recurring role (Season 5)
2018	Royally Ever After	Danny	Hallmark Movie
2020	Romance in the Air	Riley	Hallmark Movie
2021	Much Ado About Christmas	Claud	GAC Movie
2024	Unwrapping Christmas: Tina's Miracle	Sean Whitlock	Hallmark Movie
2024	Unwrapping Christmas: Mia's Prince	Sean Whitlock	Hallmark Movie
2024	Unwrapping Christmas: Lily's Destiny	Sean Whitlock	Hallmark Movie
2024	Unwrapping Christmas: Oilvia's Reunion	Sean Whitlock	Hallmark Movie
2025	Hearts Around the Table: Kiki's Fourth Ingredient	Clay Rutherford	Hallmark Movie
