= Jonathan Keltz =

American actor (born 1988)

- Born: Jonathan Lippert Keltz; January 17, 1988 (age 38); New York City, New York, U.S.
- Occupation: Actor
- Years active: 2004–present
- Spouse: Laysla De Oliveira (m. 2025)

Jonathan Lippert Keltz (born January 17, 1988) is an American-Canadian actor known for his role as Jake Steinberg in the HBO series Entourage, and his work in the films Prom (2011) and 21 & Over (2013). He starred as Leith Bayard in The CW's series Reign. In May 2014, Keltz was promoted to series regular for the show's second season, which premiered in October 2014.

== Early life ==
Keltz was born in New York City, the son of Karin Lippert, who worked in public relations, and Martin Keltz, who is a co-founder of Scholastic Productions.

After moving to Canada with his family, he attended high school at the Northern Secondary School in Toronto, Ontario. His father is of Polish Jewish descent, while his mother is German (born in Hamburg). Keltz was raised in his father's Jewish religion.

Keltz began taking acting classes when he was 10 years old and began working as an actor when he was 16. In Toronto, he lived in an apartment once occupied by Keanu Reeves.

By 2011, in pursuit of his career, Keltz had moved from his parents' home in Toronto to a residence in Los Angeles, He returned to Toronto for numerous roles, including his five years of work on the locally produced series Reign, during which time he became a Canadian-American dual citizen.

== Career ==
June 1, 2011, Keltz was reported as wrapping filming of the final season of Entourage. His new projects at that time included the 2011 films Prom, released in April 2011 by Disney, in which he played the role of Brandon Roberts, an oblivious but self-confident teen preparing for his school's prom night, the completed horror film Playback, in which a group of high school students unwittingly unleash an evil spirit that destroys its victims through video playback, and the film Transgression.

== Personal life ==
Keltz met actress Laysla De Oliveira in 2012 and the two began dating. After 10 years the couple became engaged in Malibu, California, in December 2021. They married in 2024.

== Filmography ==
Film
Year	Title	Role	Notes
2005	Cake	Valet	
2006	Silver Road	Mark	Short film
2007	Breach	Greg Hanssen	
2007	American Pie Presents: Beta House	Wesley	Direct-to-DVD
2011	Prom	Brandon Roberts	
2011	Transgression	David	
2012	Playback	Nate	
2012	Operation: CTF	Panther	Short film
2013	21 & Over	Randy	
2013	The Privileged	Jeff Lynley	
2017	White Night	Sully	
2018	Acquainted	Allan	
2019	The Cuban	Ethan	

Television
Year	Title	Role	Notes
2004	Degrassi: The Next Generation	Nate	4 episodes
2004	Radio Free Roscoe	Mark	Episode: "Lil' and Grace"
2005	Mayday	Dough Berry	TV movie
2005	Queer as Folk	Lucas	Season 5, episode 4
2005	Missing	Joe Johnstone	Episode: "Patient X"
2006	Dark Oracle	Harvey	Episode: "Trail Blaze"
2007	ReGenesis	Jeff Riddlemeyer	2 episodes
2007	Cold Case	Dom Barron '63	Episode: "Boy Crazy"
2008	The Cleaner	Jeff	Episode: "House of Pain"
2009–2011	Entourage	Jake Steinberg	15 episodes
2009	Heartland	Cody Dawson	Episode: "The Fix"
2009	Dadnapped	Tripp Zoome	TV movie
2009	Acceptance	Harry Burton	TV movie
2010	CSI: Miami	Ben Wilcox	Episode: "See No Evil"
2011	Breakout Kings	Oliver Day	Episode: "Steaks"
2011	The Listener	Tyler Rooker	Episode: "Eye of the Storm"
2011	Combat Hospital	Private Henry Flax	Episode: "Inner Truth"
2011	Leverage	Travis Zilgram	Episode: "The Experimental Job"
2012	Fairly Legal	Jacob Mathews	Episode: "Borderline"
2012	Flashpoint	Luke	Episode: "Below the Surface"
2013	Transporter: The Series	Clyde	Episode: "Give the Guy a Hand"
2013	Murdoch Mysteries	Ralph Bridgewater	Episode: "Twisted Sisters"
2013–2014	Republic of Doyle	Grayson Mann	9 episodes
2013	Necessary Roughness	Darryl "Hutch" Hutchinson	3 episodes
2017	Cardinal	Kevin Tate	Season 2
2017	Brimming with Love	Sam Jensen	TV movie
2013–2017	Reign	Leith Bayard	Recurring role (Season 1); Main role (Season 2-4); Nominated – Golden Maple Award for Best Actor in a TV series broadcasted in the U.S. (2015); Nominated – Golden Maple Award for Best Actor in a TV series broadcast in the U.S. (2016)
2018	Once Upon A Prince	Prince Nathaniel (Nate)	TV movie
2020	Falling for Look Lodge	Noah	TV movie
2021	Fit for a Prince	Prince Ronan	TV movie
2022	Stalked by a Prince	Prince Jack	TV movie
2023	Wilderness	Detective Wiseman	Recurring role
2023	Christmas by Design		TV movie
