= Stephanie Sengupta =

American television producer and writer

- Education: Carleton College (BA); Washington and Lee University (JD); New York University (MFA)
- Occupations: Television producer, writer
- Years active: 2002–present
- Known for: Law & Order (franchise), Reign

Stephanie Sengupta (also credited as Stephanie SenGupta or Stéphanie Sengupta) is an American television producer and writer. She is a co-creator of the series Reign and known for writing and co-producing episodes of the police procedural dramas Hawaii Five-0, Law & Order and Law & Order: Criminal Intent, and for foreign adaptations of the Law & Order franchise.

== Biography ==
She is of mixed Bengali Indian and French-American descent. Her father is from Kolkata, West Bengal, India, while her mother is American, with French ancestry.

== Filmography ==
Year	Film	Credited as				
Year	Film	Created by	Executive producer (episodes)	Producer (episodes)	Writer/screenwriter (episodes)	Editor (episodes)
2002–2007	Law & Order: Criminal Intent			Yes (88)	Yes (19)	Yes (22)
2007	Paris enquêtes criminelles				Yes (3)	
2007–2009	Law & Order: Criminal Mind (Russia)				Yes (9)	
2008–2009	Law & Order			Yes (22)	Yes (7)	
2009–2010	Ghost Whisperer			Yes (20)	Yes (4)	
2010	Outlaw			Yes (2)	Yes (1)	
2011	Chase			Yes (4)	Yes (1)	
2011–2013	Hawaii Five-0			Yes (16)	Yes (6)	
2013–2014	Reign	Yes	Yes (7)		Yes (42)	
2014	Resurrection				Yes (1)	
2015	The Good Wife			Yes (22)	Yes (3)	
2016–2020	Criminal Minds			Yes (69)	Yes (7)	
