= List of Chasing Life episodes =

Chasing Life is an American drama series on ABC Family that premiered on June 10, 2014. The series follows 24-year-old April (Italia Ricci), a smart and quick-witted aspiring journalist who is diagnosed with leukemia by her estranged uncle George (Steven Weber). April must deal with the impact of her diagnosis on her career as well as her family and friends - her best friend and confidant Beth (Aisha Dee), widowed mom Sara (Mary Page Keller), rebellious little sister Brenna (Haley Ramm), and her sweet grandmother Emma (Rebecca Schull) - and her budding relationship with her coworker Dominic (Richard Brancatisano). On November 27, 2013, ahead of its premiere, Chasing Life was picked up for a full season, and later an additional episode functioning as a Christmas special. On November 6, 2014, Chasing Life was renewed for a second season. The second season premiered on July 6, 2015, and ended on September 28, 2015. On October 2, 2015, Chasing Life was officially canceled after two seasons, with a total of 34 episodes produced.

== Series overview ==
Season	Episodes	Originally released	
Season	Episodes	First released	Last released
1	21	June 10, 2014	March 23, 2015
2	13	July 6, 2015	September 28, 2015

== Episodes ==
=== Season 1 (2014–15) ===
No. overall	No. in season	Title	Directed by	Written by	Original release date	U.S. viewers (millions)
1	1	"Pilot"	Steve Miner	Teleplay by : Susanna Fogel & Joni Lefkowitz	June 10, 2014	1.34
April Carver is a young up-and-coming newspaper reporter, whose life turns upside down after discovering that she has cancer. Along with building her journalism career, she falls for Dominic, a handsome co-worker, dealing with her rebellious younger sister Brenna, and her widowed mother getting back on the dating scene.
2	2	"Help Wanted"	Steve Miner	Susanna Fogel & Joni Lefkowitz	June 17, 2014	1.11
Despite having cancer, April refuses to let it affect her career and family. April later tells Beth about it, with Beth becoming overly worried about her health. April discovers that her dad may have fathered another daughter, who is close to her age. April is given a supervisor named Raquel (Shi Ne Nielson) to report a story on gubernatorial candidate Bruce Hendrie (Todd Waring), she later ends up running into his son Leo (Scott Michael Foster). Sara wants Brenna to get a job, to be more responsible, after catching her in a lie.
3	3	"Blood Cancer Sex Carrots"	Joanna Kerns	Patrick Sean Smith	June 24, 2014	1.11
April does a blog piece on Gerald (Sam Anderson), a juice maker who claims that his carrot juice can reduce cancer symptoms. April starts to question whether she should be sexually active with Dominic. Brenna invites Kieran to dinner with the family. Sara learns that the new guy she is dating is also the ex-husband of a new patient.
4	4	"I'll Sleep When I'm Dead"	Steve Miner	Josh Senter	July 1, 2014	1.12
April discovers that Leo also has cancer, and makes a deal with him to get a good story. April's cancer continues to intensify with her oversleeping. Brenna must do a class project with Greer (Gracie Dzienny), a popular girl at her school, who is a lesbian and realizes they have a lot in common. Sara begins taking tango classes.
5	5	"The Family That Lies Together"	Andy Wolk	Linda Burstyn	July 8, 2014	1.21
April with Dominic's help begins to investigate her father Thomas' (Tom Irwin) past. Sara confronts April about her secretive behavior. Now knowing that April has cancer, Brenna's mind is plagued with concern for April, and Beth gives Brenna advice about her love triangle between Kieran and Greer.
6	6	"Clear Minds, Full Lives, Can't Eat"	Steve Miner	Ann Cherkis	July 15, 2014	1.19
April's cancer symptoms causes her to lose her appetite. Leo encourages April to live her life more carefree. Now knowing about April's cancer, Sara becomes overprotective of April. Greer invites Brenna to a save the whales party. Brenna starts to feel conflicted about her relationship with Kieran, due to her close friendship with Greer. Just as Greer was going to tell her something important, Kieran shows up to Greer's party after Ford sends a text to him from Brenna's phone, causing Greer to become jealous.
7	7	"Unplanned Parenthood"	Melanie Mayron	Benjamin C. Jones	July 22, 2014	1.13
April sees a fertility doctor before deciding to start chemotherapy. Dominic is offered a traveling music journalist job that may cause him to be away from April for four months. Brenna starts give in to her romantic feelings for Greer. Sara starts to feel isolated, when her overprotectiveness becomes too much for April.
8	8	"Death Becomes Her"	Steve Miner	Jeanne Leitenberg	July 29, 2014	1.08
April and Leo help Jackson (Andy Mientus), a fellow cancer patient from their support group, live on what could be his last days of life. On a class field trip to Miami, Brenna along with Greer try to get to know Natalie. Sara spends the day with a group of other parents of cancer patients, and gets to know George a lot more.
9	9	"What to Expect When You're Expecting Chemo"	Melanie Mayron	Lisa Melamed	August 5, 2014	1.11
April makes the preparations to begin chemotherapy. Leo is admitted to the hospital after having a tumor-related episode on live television. Everyone at The Boston Post finds out about April's condition. Kieran finds out about Brenna and Greer's romantic relationship and has conflicted feelings about it.
10	10	"Finding Chemo"	Michael Grossman	Susanna Fogel & Joni Lefkowitz	August 12, 2014	1.30
After April starts chemotherapy, she begins to struggle with her new situation. Dominic is back in Boston to support April but later breaks up with her after he sees her with Leo. Brenna gets in trouble at school and Greer's parents won't allow her to see Brenna anymore. George confesses his feelings for Sarah. At the end, April is left wondering whether something happened to Leo after receiving a voicemail from him and seeing his parents in the hospital.
11	11	"Locks of Love"	Lee Rose	Susanna Fogel & Joni Lefkowitz	December 9, 2014	1.22
April plays Leo's voicemail and is relieved to know that he had decided to go ahead with the surgery to try to remove his brain tumor. Meanwhile, her paternal grandparents (Ed Asner and Marion Ross) are in town, causing friction and awkwardness in the Carver household. Brenna struggles with telling her grandparents about her sexual orientation, while Sara and George don't know where they stand after their kiss. Also, April starts losing her hair and finds comfort with Leo. During his risky surgery the next day, it is shown that Leo has flatlined.
12	12	"Next April"	Janice Cooke	Ann Cherkis	January 19, 2015	1.02
Four months later, April is officially in remission, and Leo has survived his surgery and has been in a comatose state. Facing her first day back at work, she has to deal with being around Dominic again after their breakup, as well as new challenges caused by Aaron, a young, new, ambitious boss and the side-effects of her chemo. Meanwhile, Sara and Brenna are uncertain about each of their relationships, and an ideal bone marrow donor has yet to be found, so Sara decides to reach out to Natalie and her mother Olivia (Laura Harring).
13	13	"Guess Who's Coming to Donate?"	Norman Buckley	Josh Senter	January 26, 2015	0.782
Leo fully awakens from his coma and tries pushing April away with him regretting that he went through his surgery. Natalie is discovered to be a half-match for bone marrow for April, but has second thoughts about going through the procedure. Brenna hopes to change Natalie's mind by accepting her invitation to a college football tailgate party. George feels that Sara is purposely being hesitant on telling April and Brenna about their relationship. April tries regain the trust of her new boss Aaron, while Beth and Dominic try to redefine their friendship.
14	14	"Cancer Friends with Benefits"	Steve Miner	Linda Burstyn	February 2, 2015	0.775
Leo and April try their hands at a relationship while April and Dominic have to awkwardly work the same event together with the pain of their breakup still lingering. Natalie decides to stay in Boston, citing that Florida was "boring" and becomes Beth's new roommate. Meanwhile, George announces that he's leaving for a job opportunity in San Francisco so Sara and the family host a final dinner for him.
15	15	"April Just Wants to Have Fun"	Joanna Kerns	Jeanne Leitenberg	February 9, 2015	0.916
April is feeling pressured between her previous relationship with Dominic and her friendship with Beth, with both relationships being altered by Natalie. So to compensate, April spends her late night partying. Meanwhile, Brenna is feeling alone at the start of the school year and reunites with Ford, after a meme about her goes around school, causing her to be bullied.
16	16	"The Big Leagues"	Patrick Norris	Susanna Fogel & Joni Lefkowitz	February 16, 2015	0.813
April gets a chance for a big story with Richie Miranda, a famous baseball player after receiving news that she is still in remission. However, the story will end up giving her a tough moral choice. April and Leo get some good news in their relationship following April's trip to the doctor while Leo is tired of living in the shadow of his family. Meanwhile, Brenna becomes concerned about Greer when she begins acting up at school. Greer and Brenna then reveal things that shock both of them. Also, Sara butts heads with an immigration lawyer she is sharing her office building with.
17	17	"Model Behavior"	Steve Miner	Allison Rymer	February 23, 2015	0.806
April faces backlash from the Boston public after the release of her article on Richie Miranda's drug use. She is forced to do an on-air interview, which she prepares for with Raquel's help. She also doesn't know what to do about Leo, whom she's reluctant to involve in the Miranda scandal. Beth gets Brenna and Greer to agree to be models for her fashion house's new line, but problems arise on the big night as the girls try to define their relationship. Also, Sara is shocked to find out that Emma is dating, which makes her think about her own love life.
18	18	"Rest in Peace"	Melanie Mayron	Linda Burstyn	March 2, 2015	0.733
After getting a nose bleed, April is worried that her cancer is back. Sara is worried about Brenna's post-high school life and that Natalie is a bad influence on Brenna. Beth's work schedule leaves her with hardly any time to spend with Graham.
19	19	"Life, Actually"	Janice Cooke	Ann Cherkis	March 9, 2015	0.635
Leo tells April that he no longer wants to attend cancer support group, wanting to put his cancer behind him. Beth and Graham agree to find an apartment to live in together, however Beth has conflicting feelings about it. With the support of Brenna, Greer finally finds the courage to stand up to her parents. Natalie and Dominic sleep together.
20	20	"No News Is Bad News"	Joe Lazarov	Susanna Fogel & Joni Lefkowitz	March 16, 2015	0.694
Raquel is promoted to editor-in-chief of The Boston Post, which intensifies competition between April and Danny. Greer's parents are divorcing, with Brenna wanting Greer to move in with the family. Sara cleans out the storage unit that belonged to Thomas, and visits George who is in a medical seminar in Cleveland. April is not happy after learning that Natalie and Dominic slept together.
21	21	"One Day"	Wendey Stanzler	Patrick Sean Smith	March 23, 2015	0.934
April's cancer relapses, just as The Boston Post is firing numerous employees. Brenna is a bone marrow match for Finn, a male student with one leg. Sara and George try to make it back to Boston in time for April to begin her chemotherapy. Leo proposes to April, and she says yes.

=== Season 2 (2015) ===
No. overall	No. in season	Title	Directed by	Written by	Original release date	U.S. viewers (millions)
22	1	"A View from the Ledge"	Steve Miner	Patrick Sean Smith	July 6, 2015	0.723
April and Leo leave the hospital one month after their proposal, and they begin plans on an engagement party. After quitting The Boston Post, April tries to get another journalism job. Natalie continues to question whether Dominic still has feelings for April.
23	2	"The Age of Consent"	Charlie Stratton	Susanna Fogel	July 13, 2015	0.785
April and Beth take an impromptu vacation to Bermuda as April mulls over which clinical trial she needs to take. Financial issues forces Sara to decide whether to continue paying for April's treatment or Brenna's private school, just as Brenna is starting to fit in.
24	3	"Life of Brenna"	Michael Grossman	Joni Lefkowitz	July 20, 2015	0.719
Brenna continually feels neglected by her family, with her needs coming second to April's. Brenna's bonding with Natalie makes April feel left out. Dominic and his mom bond, with her getting a new job as a real estate agent.
25	4	"Truly Madly Deeply"	Patrick Norris	Jeanne Leitenberg	July 27, 2015	0.601
April meets with an old friend (John Billingsley) of her father's to find out more information on her father's unpublished novel. Brenna and Margo's relationship is intruded upon by Margo's jealous ex Juliet (Leisha Hailey). Sara reunites with her old high school boyfriend William (Greg Germann), who is now gay.
26	5	"The Domino Effect"	Wendey Stanzler	Carrie Rosen	August 3, 2015	0.611
April has her bachelorette party and soon decides to act wild knowing that she will be spending the rest of her life with Leo. April also decides she wants to write a novel, with the possibility of it being published in two years, which she may not be alive to see. Leo's ex-girlfriend and "best man" Frankie (Amber West) helps Leo prepare for the wedding. Brenna and Ford invite Finn to Brenna's house to hang out.
27	6	"The Last W"	Janice Cooke	Aaron Fullerton	August 10, 2015	0.752
April and Leo's wedding day finally arrives and April begins to suspect that Leo is only marrying her out of pity. Dominic is hesitant to go the wedding, due to him still having feelings for April.
28	7	"As Long As We Both Shall Live"	Susanna Fogel	Joni Lefkowitz	August 17, 2015	0.754
April and Leo get accustomed to their new married life and soon decide to get a new place so April can fully focus on writing her novel. They also disagree about wanting to have children, with Leo wanting to have kids, and April not seeing that happen in her future. As a bisexual, Brenna feels ostracized at the LGBT support group in her school and offends Finn by saying that she is not interested in dating him. Sara pretends that she and William are dating to show George that she is not lonely. Beth agrees to date a pharmaceutical sales representative so April can get easier access to a cancer drug. April and Leo have an Italian-themed date to make up for missing their honeymoon. The next morning, Leo dies in his sleep.
29	8	"The Ghost in You"	Lee Rose	Aaron Fullerton	August 24, 2015	0.772
After having Leo's funeral, April and Beth find a letter that Leo wanted opened after he died, with the letter leading to a scavenger hunt. Finn trains for a track and field race with Brenna's help.
30	9	"Wild Thing"	Joe Lazarov	Jeanne Leitenberg	August 31, 2015	0.642
April receives her inheritance from Leo's death and looks to spend her way out of her grief, to the worries of her family and friends. She also starts on the new clinical trial. Meanwhile, Brenna premieres her short film with George showing his support.
31	10	"A Bottle of Secrets"	Norman Buckley	Jeffrey Stepakoff	September 7, 2015	0.591
Everyone is snowed in at the Carver home. April and Natalie have some burning questions for George in regards to their father Thomas, while Brenna is more reluctant to jump to conclusions. George is having relationship issues with Mae, partly because of Sara. April and Beth make up. It is revealed that George had assisted Thomas in committing suicide after finding out that he had ALS. Soon after, Beth arrives home one day to find that Natalie has skipped town.
32	11	"First Person"	Brandon Mastrippolito	Aaron Fulerton	September 14, 2015	0.679
Natalie leaves Boston upon finding out the truth about George and Thomas, and the rest of the family fears that she will tell the authorities about what really happened concerning Thomas' death. A summer camp is opening in Leo's honor and April is asked to be at the ribbon cutting ceremony and speak on Leo's behalf. Dominic also accompanies April to the camp. Still writing her autobiography, April shops it to different literary agents. Brenna is reluctant to accept the truth about George and Thomas and is concerned about the attention Finn is receiving for a school charity. One of Beth's designs is featured in a fashion blog, giving her much exposure. Beth then uses the opportunity to get a promotion at her job but after reading her contract and realizing she can't take ownership for her designs, she quits. Natalie's mother Olivia reveals she has the entire manuscript of Thomas' spy novel. April and Beth decide to live together.
33	12	"Ready or Not"	Michael Lange	Joni Lefkowitz	September 21, 2015	0.538
April and her agent come across a potential publisher, but find out that a former rival from her college days is her direct competition and things get heated. April also finds out about Dominic's lingering feelings for her in the midst of still mourning Leo. Brenna and Finn go to the winter ball together. Meanwhile, Beth is stressing over her new change in career plans. She also finds out that she's pregnant. With the help of Raquel, April ends up winning over the publisher, however, she is shocked to find that Natalie's mother Olivia is shopping around her father's "Chasing Life" novel for publication.
34	13	"La Dolce Vita"	Steve Miner	Patrick Sean Smith & Jared Frieder	September 28, 2015	0.486
The Carvers meet up with Natalie and Olivia, who blackmail them by saying that if George doesn't sign off the rights to publish Thomas' novel, they will turn him into the police for assisting in the accident. Natalie insists that she still wants a relationship with her sisters, but they're not receptive. When Finn gets really sick, he breaks up with Brenna to focus on his recovery. Greer comes back to town. Beth tries to find the nerve to tell Josh about the baby. April receives news that her clinical trial isn't working, which leads her to a conversation with Dominic about their feelings. In the end, Natalie gets her mother to drop everything, but the authorities still show up to question George. Brenna figures out that her stem cell match is most likely Finn. Meanwhile, April takes Beth and Dominic with her to Italy to find inspiration for the ending of her memoir, where she also decides to forgo any more trials or transplants and live out her days contently.
