= Unjaded Jade =

English YouTuber (born 2000)

Jade Bowler
- Born: 17 March 2000 (age 26); Slough, England
- Occupations: YouTuber; author

YouTube information
- Channel: UnJaded Jade
- Years active: 2017–present
- Genre: Education
- Subscribers: 1 million
- Views: 133 million
- Last updated: 25 April 2026
- Website: jade-bowler.squarespace.com

Jade Esmee Bowler (born 17 March 2000), more commonly known by her YouTube handle, Unjaded Jade, is a YouTuber and author. She has been referred to as one of the first "StudyTubers".

== Early life and education ==
Bowler is from Berkshire. She is the daughter of Simon Bowler and Annet Venema. She is half Dutch. Her mother is a yoga instructor. She achieved A* grades in A-level biology, chemistry and maths, which earned her a place to study a biology course at Bristol University, although she had initially hoped to go to Oxford but did not get a place. However, Bowler ended up attending Minerva University instead. She began studying there in 2019 after traveling and taking a gap year, and graduated in 2023.

== Career ==
Bowler started her channel in February 2017. Bowler's content focuses on school and studying and she has been referred to as an originator of what is known as "StudyTube". She is signed by Sixteenth, a talent agency. With fellow StudyTubers Ruby Granger, Eve Cornwell, and Jack Edwards, Bowler co-created the podcast, The Wooden Spoon.

In 2021, she published a book, The Only Study Guide You'll Ever Need, with Blink Publishing.

In 2022, she launched a Kickstarter for a mindfulness app Tend which was later cancelled.

== Personal life ==
Bowler is part of the LGBTQ community; in 2025, she spoke to Hinge about the impact of social media on her sexuality, explaining, "Social media has also left me worrying I wasn't 'gay enough'. If I wasn't sporting a carabiner to signal my queerness, would any girl fancy me? I ended up wearing markers of queerness that didn't match my style, just to fit an online idea of what gay should look like."
