= OwlCrate =

Book subscription service company

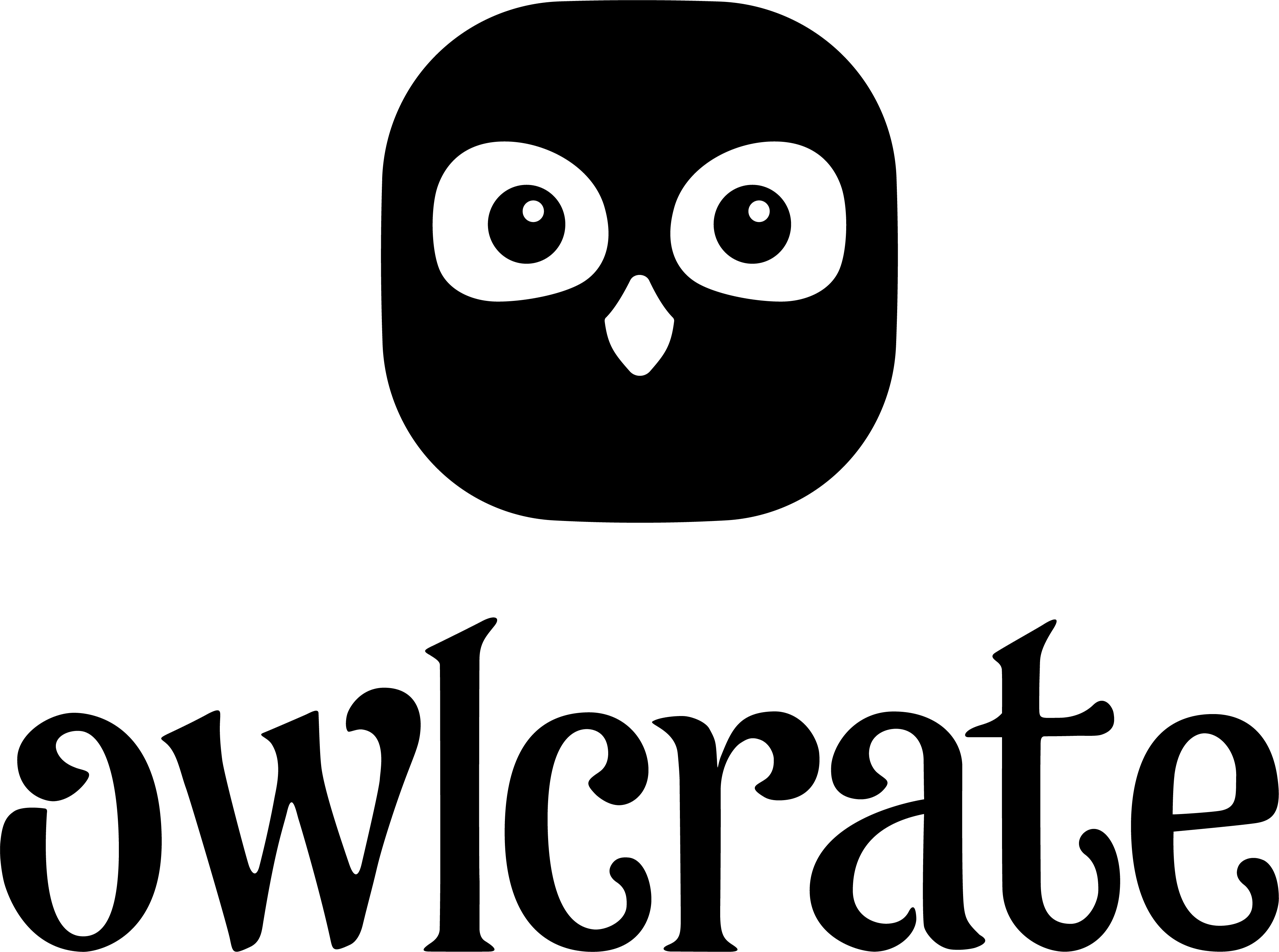
- Type: Subscription service
- Founded: 2015; 11 years ago
- Key people: Korrina Ede (founder); Robert Madden (co-founder)
- Website: www.owlcrate.com

OwlCrate is a web-based subscription service business specializing in monthly boxes shipped out internationally by mail, themed around books and book collecting. While OwlCrate is largely popular with book reviewers on social media, the service ships books to anybody within select available countries who places an order. Subscription boxes are largely themed around the fiction genres of science fiction and fantasy, with boxes designed both for young children and adolescent readers. Subscription boxes typically contain an exclusive (rare design) book cover with an author autograph, and a variety of surprise items associated with the book, including coffee mugs, t-shirts, pillow cases, lip balm, stickers, pinback buttons, jewellery and other paraphernalia.

== History ==
OwlCrate was officially launched in 2015 after months of development by its founders, Robert Madden and Korrina Ede. It began as a small home-based business, with the first book title included in the OwlCrate shipments being V. E. Schwab's fantasy novel A Darker Shade of Magic. Since 2015, OwlCrate has reportedly amassed thousands of subscribers, many of whom include Goodreads book reviewers, social media gurus, authors and book collectors.

In comparison, OwlCrate orders most of its non-book stock from independent artists, and continues to sell remaining stock from previous monthly boxes at a reduced price until the stock eventually runs out. One of the biggest assets that initially drew fans to the subscription service was that the OwlCrate versions of shipped books always have an exclusive cover and are autographed by the author, with most of these authors being traditionally-published by large publishing houses. According to a thesis study done through the Faculty of Communication, Art and Technology at Simon Fraser University, "exclusive covers vary book to book — some books will have a slight change in colour or font, some will have significant changes, and some will have a totally different and unique cover. Sometimes OwlCrate edition books will have sprayed or foiled edges as well. Having these extra details allows subscribers to see the value in OwlCrate books versus buying the book in the traditional bookstore or online."

== Harry Potter controversy ==
In 2020, OwlCrate began facing criticism for selling items related to the children's fantasy book series Harry Potter, owing to the author's views on transgender people. The book subscription service also faced criticism for its official logo, featuring an image of a cartoon owl delivering a small bundle of books, a symbol based on Harry Potter's fictional pet owl, Hedwig, delivering mail (also the namesake of OwlCrate itself). This sparked a debate about cancel culture, the limits of corporate responsibility, and transphobia in the online reading community. OwlCrate responded by arguing that the company had been created originally with a love of Harry Potter for its inspiration, and that an admiration for the Harry Potter franchise did not equate to support of Rowling's remarks about transgender people. The company discontinued the sale of any Harry Potter-themed merchandise for 1 year, before resuming the sale of Harry Potter merchandise in 2021. This decision was controversial, with writer Danika Ellis of BookRiot stating, "while [Harry Potter] always had flaws — including its fatphobia, overwhelming whiteness and racism, and antisemitism — the author deciding to use her platform primarily to endanger one of the most vulnerable groups in society is on another level. It’s targeted and deliberate. Other comments on Instagram and Twitter reacting to OwlCrate’s statement echo this disappointment, with many people expressing that they will be cancelling their subscription. [...] [Harry Potter has] become a dogwhistle for transphobia. Harry Potter mentions [...] now signal that this space is not trans-friendly, regardless of intention."

OwlCrate formally decided to cease the sale of all Harry Potter products in the late summer of 2021. The Mary Sue criticized OwlCrate's initial decision to reinstate Harry Potter merchandise beforehand, arguing that the company was transphobic, and also accusing OwlCrate of allowing transphobic social media influencers to have a "field day" in the comments sections of the OwlCrate Instagram page where the company had posted an apologetic announcement about the Harry Potter decision. The company has not sold any Harry Potter items or J.K. Rowling items since 2021.

== OwlCrate Jr. ==
OwlCrate Jr. was the secondary branch of OwlCrate, targeted towards young children as its demographic. OwlCrate Jr. was discontinued after December 2023. Subscription boxes included toys, games, books, author letters, activity pads, stickers and other items related to the box's main book. OwlCrate Jr. was picked as one of the winners of the National Parenting Product Awards (N.P.P.A.) in November 2021.

== See also ==
- Loot Crate
- Literati (book club)
- Politics of J.K. Rowling
