= StudyTube =

YouTube community and genre

StudyTube, sometimes referred to as EduTube, is an informal group of content creators on YouTube whose content focuses on studying, test and exam preparation, and school. These types of YouTubers are known as StudyTubers. The term can also refer to the genre of YouTube video characterized by its focus on the same topics.

== Origins ==
Some have claimed StudyTube began as early as 2015. YouTubers Derin Adetosoye and Ruby Granger cite 2018 as the year StudyTube came about. However, StudyTube channels, including Granger's, existed and created StudyTube content in 2017. The Times popularized the term StudyTuber in 2018. The genre was repopularized during the COVID-19 pandemic.

StudyTube has counterpart communities on other platforms, including Studyblr (Tumblr), Studygram (Instagram), and Studytok (TikTok). Studyblr predates StudyTube and has been referred to as an origin point for StudyTube.

== Format ==
The most common video format on StudyTube is real-time, often hours long, "study with me" style videos and livestreams featuring someone studying on camera. StudyTubers often give advice for GCSEs and A-Levels. StudyTube videos can also include grade or results-reaction videos and Q&As about university life. It is also common for StudyTube videos to be vlogs of the content creator's university experience. StudyTube videos often focus on productivity, though some have criticized StudyTube for promoting a culture of so-called 'toxic productivity.'

== Notable channels ==
Most prominent StudyTubers are British. Prominent British StudyTube channels include Jack Edwards, Eve Bennett, Eve Cornwell, UnJaded Jade, Ruby Granger, and Vee Kativhu.

== See also ==
- BookTube
