= Bury Our Bones in the Midnight Soil =

2025 fantasy novel by V. E. Schwab

- First edition cover
- Author: V. E. Schwab
- Cover artist: Peter Lutjen
- Language: English
- Genre: Dark fantasy
- Publisher: Tor Books
- Publication date: June 10, 2025
- Publication place: United States
- Pages: 535
- ISBN: 9781035064649
- Dewey Decimal: 813.6 23

Bury Our Bones in the Midnight Soil is a 2025 LGBTQ dark fantasy novel by American author V. E. Schwab. It was published by Tor Books on June 10, 2025. The novel intertwines the storylines of three lesbian vampires from different countries and periods. It won a Goodreads Choice Award in the Readers' Favorite Fantasy category. The unabridged audiobook is narrated by Marisa Calin, Katie Leung, and Julia Whelan.

== Development ==
V. E. Schwab has stated that she considers Bury Our Bones in the Midnight Soil to be her most autobiographical book. She was inspired by classic vampire lore, including Carmilla and Anne Rice's work. She considers classic vampires to be inherently queer and has a lifelong love of vampires. The novel takes place in the same universe as one of her previous novels, The Invisible Life of Addie LaRue. She has stated the three storylines represent the three eras of her own coming out journey. She wrote the three storylines in their entirety before linking them together.

== Synopsis ==
In 1532, María, a peasant from Santo Domingo de la Calzada, marries a wealthy viscount in an attempt to gain control over her life, but after finding herself stifled by her domineering husband and desperate to avoid pregnancy, she escapes with the help of a herbalist widow she had known as a child, who turns her into a vampire.

In 1827, Charlotte is sent from her home in rural England to live with her aunt in London and find a husband after her brother finds her kissing her best friend Jocelyn. There, she encounters a widow named Sabine, who turns her into a vampire as the two enter into a relationship.

In 2019, Alice has recently left her small town in Scotland to study at Harvard and to escape from the shadow of her more outgoing sister, Catty. After waking up after a one-night stand having turned into a vampire, she searches Boston for a stranger named Lottie, whom she hooked up with the night before her transformation.

== Plot ==
In 1521 María, a peasant from Santo Domingo de la Calzada, meets a strange widow, who her brother thinks may be a witch. María encounters the woman at a copse of trees, gathering herbs for a tonic. The widow warns her that "in nature, beauty is a warning", when Maria attempts to pick a poisonous mushroom.

Ten years later, at nearly 18, María meets Andres de Guzman, Viscount of Olivares, and despite her reluctance, the two are married. Andres is determined to have a son, and Maria is determined not to bear him any children, so to that end she gathers herbs for a tonic. Andres begins restricting her movements, growing angry after she has left to explore the olive orchard that belongs to their estate. Soon, he orders that she not leave the house, leaving her to solace in the company of her servants, particularly her maid, Ysabel, who teaches Maria to play cards. After some time, angered at his wife's inability to produce an heir, Andres sends Maria to live with his parents, where she is kept under watch night and day, without any friends, separated from Ysabel, and Maria is plunged into deeper and deeper isolation.

Her only solace comes from the visits that she takes with her mother-in-law at the market - and it is there that she sees The Widow again. She manages to slip away from her mother-in-law and visits the widow, who now owns an apothecary. Despite not seeing each other for 10 years, the Widow has not changed. She tells Maria her name is Sabine; and they meet every time Maria can sneak away on her trips to the market. The two grow closer, and Maria confides in her that she is searching for a tonic to prevent pregnancy, and more than anything else - freedom. Sabine tells her that they could leave together if she so desired. Maria returns home where Andres forbids her from visiting The Widow, despite Maria telling him that she has gone to get a tonic to encourage pregnancy. That night, she slips out the window and goes back to Sabine, intent on taking her up on her offer.

The Widow/Sabine leans in, and Maria expects they are going to kiss, but instead, The Widow/Sabine sinks her teeth into Maria's neck. Sabine allows Maria to feed - but Maria is insatiable, and instead of stopping, drains The Widow/Sabine completely dry, killing her. Maria returns home where Andres confronts her and drags her to the bed, but Maria sinks her teeth into his throat, whispering to him that she is now Sabine. She sets the estate aflame, and vanishes into the night.

Sabine wanders for years, eventually meeting Renata and Hector, who are fellow vampires. Renata binds Sabine to her, and the three travel together for decades, until they grow too bold in their hunting, and Hector and Renata are caught and buried alive by an angry mob, Sabine only just managing to escape.

After this she travels to Venice, where in 1679 she feeds on a woman, and is found by an ancient vampire - Matteo. Matteo is able to force her out of the city, as if it is a room with a door shut in her face. He promises to show her how if she can win a game - which she does. She stays with Matteo and his human lover, Alessandro, for years, until Alessandro grows old and dies, having refused to allow Matteo to turn him. In his grief, Matteo turns another young, reckless man, who is eventually caught and killed. Sabine, who has grown angry and impatient with Matteo for not turning Alessandro when he had the chance, and his own recklessness with love, leaves. Sabine begins to recognise that as time goes on, she is losing more and more parts of herself, and forgetting her humanity, which, ultimately, she is grateful for.

2019 - Alice, an 18 year old from Scotland, is studying in Boston, where she gets dragged to a party by her flatmates. Quiet, shy, she catches the eye of a dark, curly haired girl named Lottie, and they go back to Alice's room together, where they have sex. Alice wakes the next day feeling dreadful, and discovers small bite marks, and only a post it note from Lottie, with no contact information. Slowly, Alice realises what's happened, and is determined to find Lottie. She is forced to kill several people in order to assuage her terrible hunger, and eventually makes her way to a coffee shop run by Ezra, who takes her to the hotel where Lottie is staying.

When Alice confronts Lottie, Lottie protests and says that it must have been Sabine who turned Alice, not her.

London - 1827. Charlotte is 18, and has been sent away from her childhood home to her aunt's, after her brother found her and her best friend Jocelyn, kissing for the first time. Charlotte attends several balls, but has no interest in any men. She is at the top of the staircase when she catches the eye of a beautiful woman, and the two are immediately drawn to each other. The woman reveals her name is Sabine (formerly Maria), and that she is a widow. Charlotte and Sabine's friendship and attraction grows, with Sabine showing Charlotte how to dance. A young man also shows interest in Charlotte, and arrives at her aunt's unexpectedly, to propose. Charlotte flees to Sabine's house, where Sabine turns her.

They spend many happy decades together, although Charlotte notices slowly Sabine losing herself, and becoming increasingly possessive and controlling of her - growing angry when - after teaching Charlotte how to make a space hers and hers alone - Charlotte refuses to let Sabine entry, only capitulating when she sees Sabine's anger. After one such episode, Sabine makes Charlotte promise to never harm her, which Charlotte agrees to.

On their anniversary in London, 1927, they meet fellow vampires Jack and Antonia, who run a nightclub called The Way Down. Sabine is angry and jealous that Charlotte wants to spend time with them, and when Charlotte returns home she finds that Sabine has murdered an entire family, including a 13 year old girl. Horrified at what Sabine has become, Charlotte attempts to stab her through the heart, but finds she is unable to, due to her promise not to harm Sabine.

Charlotte is forced to run away, and spends the next decades keeping a watchful eye for Sabine, but not finding her. Eventually she makes her way to Rome, in 1953, where she meets and falls in love with Giada, a young artists model. The two spend years together, and Charlotte drops her guard, hoping that enough time has passed that Sabine will not track her down. She tells Giada what she is, and Giada allows her to drink from her, but Charlotte refuses to turn Giada.

Charlotte is cooking a meal for them when Giada returns with someone she says is a friend of Charlotte's - Sabine. Giada realises too late what she's done, and Sabine plays with Charlotte, saying if she loves Giada, Charlotte will save her. Before Charlotte can make a move, Sabine snaps Giada's neck, but can't hurt Charlotte, and she has not been invited across the threshold.

Charlotte wanders for many more years, but every relationship ends in the same way - with Sabine finding and killing them. Eventually, she stops trying to find love altogether, only allowing herself short dalliances/one night stands which she records in a notebook. For a long time she keeps an eye on these young woman to make sure that they're okay, but after a while, she stops checking up on them, until Alice knocks on her door.

Alice is furious that Lottie allowed her to get turned into a vampire, but Lottie convinces Alice that if she kills Sabine she will be freed and returned to her life. Alice and Lottie go to a club where Sabine finds Alice, who Lottie assumes has been tracking them, and takes her back to her apartment. Alice attempts to poison a cup of blood with grave dirt, but Sabine says she does not drink from anything that is not fresh.

Alice is able to kill Sabine, and realises that Lottie has lied to her about re-gaining her humanity. Understanding that both Lottie and Sabine used her for her own ends, she allows Lottie to drink the poisoned blood and die as well.

Alice calls her father back in Scotland as she walks away, pondering her new life.

== Reception ==
=== Critical reviews ===
Bury Our Bones in the Midnight Soil received positive reviews upon its release. It was praised for its compelling plot, its prose, and its feminist themes, but Alice's storyline was criticized as being less interesting than the other two.

In her review for the British Fantasy Society, Melody Bowles praised the novel's "compelling plot" and its ability to jump between settings and characters, but criticized it for its bleakness and its ending. Everdeen Mason also called the novel "compelling" in her review for the New York Times. She called the novel an "apt story for our current culture", drawing parallels between the novel's themes of expectations and constraints placed on women with the rollback of women's rights in the 2020s. However, she criticized Alice's storyline for being less enticing than the other two. Greer Macallister for the Chicago Review of Books also felt that Alice's storyline was the least appealing of the three, but recommended it to those who enjoyed Schwab's The Invisible Life of Addie LaRue for its "inventiveness, complexity, era-spanning scope, historical detail, and gorgeous writing".

In a starred review, Kirkus Reviews called the novel a "beautiful meditation on queer identity", and praised it for its subtle portrayal of grief and loneliness. Maura Krause of Reactor also commented on its queer themes, comparing it to the 1872 sapphic vampire novella Carmilla and recommending it to "readers that crave canonical vampire fiction with a queer sensibility".

In a starred review, Publishers Weekly called the novel a "haunting and worthwhile story", and praised it for the three leads' intricate backstories and Schwab's ability to balance their humanity and monstrosity.

In his review for SFF Insiders, Noah Isaacs recommended it for people who "like vampires and being emotionally devastated", and praised the novel's prose and atmosphere.

Adrienne Martini of Locus called the story a "well-tuned engine" and praised its "small moments that illuminate each character".

=== Awards ===
The novel won a Goodreads Choice Award in the Reader's Favorite Fantasy category and a Libby Book Award for Best Fantasy. It was also nominated for an Audie Award for Fantasy. It was the Indie Next List's #1 pick of June 2025.

=== Sales ===
Upon its release, Bury Our Bones in the Midnight Soil topped the USA Today Bestseller List and The New York Times Hardcover Fiction Best Seller List.
