= First Kill (TV series) =

American supernatural teen drama series

- Genre: Supernatural; Teen drama
- Created by: Victoria Schwab
- Based on: "First Kill" by V. E. Schwab
- Starring: Sarah Catherine Hook; Imani Lewis; Elizabeth Mitchell; Aubin Wise; Gracie Dzienny; Dominic Goodman; Phillip Mullings, Jr.; Jason R. Moore
- Music by: Kurt Farquhar
- Country of origin: United States
- Original language: English
- No. of seasons: 1
- No. of episodes: 8

Production
- Executive producers: Victoria Schwab; Emma Roberts; Karah Preiss; Jet Wilkinson; Felicia D. Henderson
- Producers: James Bigwood; Matt Matruski
- Cinematography: Amy Vincent; Keith L. Smith; Cliff Charles
- Editors: Bjørn T. Myrholt; Karen Castañeda; Angela Latimer; Marc Pollon
- Running time: 42–59 minutes
- Production companies: WaterWalk Entertainment, Inc.; Belletrist Productions

Original release
- Network: Netflix
- Release: June 10, 2022

First Kill is an American supernatural teen drama television series created by Victoria Schwab that premiered on Netflix on June 10, 2022. The series is based on Schwab's short story of the same name. In August 2022, the series was canceled after one season.

== Premise ==
Teenage vampire Juliette Fairmont, having celebrated her sixteenth birthday, needs to make her first kill in order to enter adulthood and take her place among her powerful family of Legacy vampires, matrilineal direct descendants of Lilith who chose to be bitten by the Serpent in the Garden of Eden. Juliette has difficulty choosing someone to feed on and struggles with her growing blood lust as she believes draining humans is wrong. She instead sets her sights romantically on the new girl Calliope Burns. Calliope, who belongs to a monster-hunting family from The Guardian Guild, needs to slay her first monster in order to gain her family's approval and officially become a Hunter herself. As both families become unavoidably involved, and Juliette and Calliope's relationship develops, the girls realize that killing each other is not so simple.

== Cast and characters ==
=== Main ===
- Sarah Catherine Hook as Juliette Fairmont
- Imani Lewis as Calliope "Cal" Burns
- Elizabeth Mitchell as Margot, Juliette's mother
- Aubin Wise as Talia, Cal's mother
- Gracie Dzienny as Elinor, Juliette's older sister
- Dominic Goodman as Apollo, Cal's older brother
- Phillip Mullings, Jr. as Theo, Cal's eldest half-brother
- Jason R. Moore as Jack, Cal's father

=== Recurring ===
- Will Swenson as Sebastian, Margot's formerly human husband
- Jonas Dylan Allen as Ben Wheeler, Juliette's best friend
- MK xyz as Tess Franklin, Cal's best friend
- Joseph D. Reitman as Clayton Cook
- Christopher B. Duncan as Principal Waters
- Walnette Santiago as Carmen
- Polly Draper as Davina Atwood, Margot's mother and ruler of the Legacy vampires
- Dylan McNamara as Oliver, Juliette's older brother and Elinor's twin brother

In addition, Roberto Méndez co-stars as Noah Harrington.

== Episodes ==
No.	Title	Directed by	Written by	Original release date
1	"First Kiss"	Jet Wilkinson	Teleplay by : Victoria Schwab	June 10, 2022
2	"First Blood"	Jet Wilkinson	Victoria Schwab & Mark Hudis	June 10, 2022
3	"First Fight"	Eriq La Salle	Bryce Ahart & Stephanie McFarlane	June 10, 2022
4	"First Date"	Eriq La Salle	Joy Blake & Italome Ohikhuare	June 10, 2022
5	"First Love"	Amanda Tapping	Miguel Nolla	June 10, 2022
6	"First Severing"	Amanda Tapping	Mark Hudis	June 10, 2022
7	"First Goodbye"	John T. Kretchmer	Joy Blake	June 10, 2022
8	"First Betrayal"	Salim Akil	Felicia D. Henderson	June 10, 2022

== Production ==
=== Development ===
Official release poster.

On October 15, 2020, Netflix gave the production a series order consisting of eight one-hour long episodes. The series is created by Victoria Schwab who also executive produced alongside Felicia D. Henderson, Emma Roberts and Karah Preiss. First Kill is based on Schwab's short story of the same name. Schwab and Henderson co-wrote the episodes. It is the first production from Roberts and Preiss's Belletrist Productions company. On April 21, 2021, it was reported that Jet Wilkinson is set to direct the first two episodes of the series. The series was released on June 10, 2022. On August 2, 2022, Netflix canceled the series after one season.

=== Casting ===
On March 10, 2021, Sarah Catherine Hook and Imani Lewis were cast to star. On May 27, 2021, Elizabeth Mitchell, Aubin Wise, Jason R. Moore, Gracie Dzienny, Will Swenson, Phillip Mullings, Jr., Dominic Goodman, Dylan McNamara, MK xyz, Jonas Dylan Allen and Roberto Mendez joined the main cast.

=== Filming ===
Production was scheduled to begin in late 2021 in Savannah, Georgia.

== Reception ==
The review aggregator website Rotten Tomatoes reports a 61% approval rating and an average rating of 5.8/10 based on 21 critic reviews. The website's critics consensus reads: "This sapphic soap about vampiric love is earnest enough to put a stake through the hearts of the genre faithful, but its clumsy execution leaves an aftertaste that's more garlicky than sweet." Metacritic, which uses a weighted average, assigned a score of 45 out of 100 based on 8 critics, indicating "mixed or average reviews".

In its first three days on Netflix, the show was watched globally for 30.34 million hours. After a month the show was watched upwards of over 100 million viewing hours peaking at number 3 in the Top 10 list for English speaking TV Shows.

IndieWire listed it as one of the 31 best vampire TV shows and called it schlocky and predictable but "fun if you let it be". Essence described it as a mash-up of Romeo and Juliet, The Vampire Diaries and "a relatable coming-of-age love story".

== Renewal efforts ==
A month after cancellation by Netflix, fans around the world have continued efforts to get the series renewed or moved to a different streaming service. The social media outcry was taken by observers as proof that there is a popular market for LGBTQ+ TV shows with queer characters and their stories in the same style as Riverdale. First Kill resonated with some fans because it is a queer storyline with Black representation and is on a list of fan favorites that Netflix cancelled. The show has been compared on a must watch list to other fan favorite shows like Fate: The Winx Saga because the focus is on young girls with mystical capabilities. In 2022, First Kill's showrunner expressed hope that the series will get renewed because of fans' efforts. Us Weekly included First Kill in a list of shows canceled too soon in November 2022.
