= Chasing Life =

American television drama series

- Genre: Drama
- Based on: Terminales by Miguel Angel Fox
- Developed by: Susanna Fogel; Joni Lefkowitz
- Starring: Italia Ricci; Mary Page Keller; Richard Brancatisano; Haley Ramm; Aisha Dee
- Opening theme: "Can't Stop Won't Stop" by Harper Blynn
- Composer: Stephen Endelman
- Country of origin: United States
- Original language: English
- No. of seasons: 2
- No. of episodes: 34 (list of episodes)

Production
- Executive producers: Susanna Fogel; Joni Lefkowitz; Patrick Sean Smith; Aaron Kaplan; Michael A. Garcia; John Ziffren
- Producers: David Hartle; Salli Newman
- Production locations: Boston, Massachusetts
- Running time: 43 minutes
- Production companies: Kapital Entertainment; Televisa International; Lionsgate Television

Original release
- Network: ABC Family
- Release: June 10, 2014 – September 28, 2015

Chasing Life is an American drama television series that aired on ABC Family from June 10, 2014, to September 28, 2015. The series is adapted from the Televisa Spanish-language Mexican television series Terminales. Ordered for 13 episodes, on November 27, 2013, an additional seven episodes were added to the series order, bringing the season to 20 episodes. On July 15, 2014, ABC Family ordered another episode to air as a Christmas special, bringing the episode order to 21.

On November 6, 2014, the series was renewed for a second season. Slated to premiere on August 17, 2015, the season two premiere was moved up to July 6.

Chasing Life was canceled on October 2, 2015.

== Premise ==
Chasing Life follows 24-year-old April, who is a smart and quick-witted aspiring journalist trying to advance her career at a Boston newspaper by impressing her hard-nosed editor. When not pursuing the latest scoop, April tries to balance her ambitious career with her family – her widowed mom Sara, rebellious little sister Brenna, and her sweet grandmother. Just as things start to look up at work, home, and on the romance front with co-worker Dominic, April finds out from an estranged uncle that she has leukemia.

== Cast and characters ==
=== Main ===
- Italia Ricci as April Carver, a junior reporter at (the fictional) The Boston Post newspaper whose life takes a turn when she is diagnosed with leukemia.
- Mary Page Keller as Sara Carver, April and Brenna's mother. She works as a therapist but her training has not helped her better relate to people outside the office.
- Richard Brancatisano as Dominic Russo, an arts reporter at The Boston Post and April's love interest. Breaks up with April after finding out she hadn't told him about cancer. Then, begins to date April's half-sister, Natalie but he doesn't commit to it, because he's clearly still in love with April.
- Haley Ramm as Brenna Carver, April's rebellious teenage sister, who went into a bad place after her father's death. In the midst of struggling with the changes in April's life, she starts dating popular classmate Greer, whose parents disapprove of her and forbid them from seeing each other. They date again briefly before breaking up due to Greer moving. In the Christmas special, Brenna came out as bisexual.
- Aisha Dee as Beth Kingston, April's best friend, who is the first person April tells about her cancer and April's most steadfast supporter.

=== Recurring ===
- Scott Michael Foster as Leo Hendrie, the son of a famous politician, who also has cancer. Also a love interest of April. Eventually asks April to marry him, and she says yes and they get married. Shortly after, he passes away in his sleep.
- Rebecca Schull as Emma, Sara's mother and April and Brenna's grandmother.
- Jessica Meraz as Natalie Ortiz, April and Brenna's paternal half-sister. She is younger than April, but older than Brenna. Thomas had an affair resulting with Natalie's birth many years ago, which only Sara and George knew about.
- Abhi Sinha as Danny Gupta, April's former co-worker turned friend.
- Steven Weber as Dr. George Carver, April and Brenna's paternal uncle, who has a romantic interest in Sara.
- Gracie Dzienny as Greer Danville, a popular girl from Brenna's school, who is Brenna's ex-girlfriend. She briefly lived with Brenna after a fallout with her parents before moving with her dad.
- Dylan Gelula as Ford, Brenna's best friend. They go through a rough patch when Brenna gets involved with Greer, but she is shown to be fiercely loyal.
- Merrin Dungey as Dr. Susan Hamburg, April's doctor.
- Shi Ne Nielson as Raquel Avila, April's supervisor turned rival
- Rob Kerkovich as Graham, Dominic's roommate and Beth's ex-boyfriend, whom she broke up with due to commitment issues.
- Augusto Aguilera as Kieran, Brenna's older ex-boyfriend who is also her boss at an art gallery/tattoo parlor.
- Alycia Grant as Meg, April's friend from her cancer support group.
- Todd Waring as Bruce Hendrie, Leo's father and Massachusetts gubernatorial candidate.
- Andy Mientus as Jackson, a fellow cancer patient from April and Leo's cancer support group.
- Aurora Perrineau as Margo, Brenna's film club advisor, whom she briefly got romantically involved with
- Parker Mack as Finn Madill, a cancer patient who attends Brenna's new public school. Unbeknownst to the two of them, Brenna happens to also be Finn's bone marrow donor.
- Vondie Curtis-Hall as Lawrence, April and Danny's boss at The Boston Post.
- Tom Irwin as Thomas Carver, April, Brenna and Natalie's father and George's brother. Known to the world as a famous novelist, his personal life remains a mystery that his daughters are trying to sort through.
- Stephen Schneider as Aaron Phillips, April and Danny's boss at The Boston Post, who replaced Lawrence.
- Bob Gebert as Dr. Stibler, Leo's doctor.

== Episodes ==
Season	Episodes	Originally released	
Season	Episodes	First released	Last released
1	21	June 10, 2014	March 23, 2015
2	13	July 6, 2015	September 28, 2015

== Broadcast ==
Promotional poster of the series' premiere.

Chasing Life premiered on June 10, 2014, running ten episodes out of an already ordered twenty. On July 15, 2014, an additional episode for the first season functioning as a Christmas special was ordered, and aired on December 9, 2014. The season returned on January 19, 2015. On November 6, 2014, Chasing Life was renewed for a second season. The second-season premiere in July 2015 and concluded in September 2015.

In Canada, the series premiered on ABC Spark on June 10, 2014.

In Australia, the series premiered on Fox8 on July 21, 2014, and returned for the second half of season one on February 3, 2015.

=== International broadcasting ===
Country/Region	Channel	Premiere	Title	Ref.
United States	Freeform	June 10, 2014	Chasing Life	
Canada	ABC Spark	June 10, 2014	Chasing Life	
Australia	Fox8	July 21, 2014	Chasing Life	
Latin America	Fox Life	October 14, 2014	Chasing Life	
Turkey	Dizimax Drama	October 22, 2014	Chasing Life	
Germany; Austria; Liechtenstein; Switzerland	Disney Channel	January 13, 2015	Chasing Life	
Poland	Lifetime	April 8, 2015	Pojedynek na życie	
Bulgaria	Fox Life	August 14, 2015	Борба за живот	
Italy	Premium Stories	September 4, 2015	Chasing Life	
India	Colors Infinity	September 10, 2015	Chasing Life	
Mexico	Canal 5*	November 12, 2016	Apreciando la vida	
United Kingdom	Sony Channel	October 17, 2017	Chasing Life	

== Reception ==
=== Critical reception ===
On the review aggregator website Rotten Tomatoes, the first season holds an approval rating of 75% based on 16 reviews, with an average rating of 7.30/10. The site's critics consensus reads, "Though the show would benefit from a sharper focus on its overall theme, Italia Ricci's believable leading performance makes Chasing Life worth following." On Metacritic, the first season of the show holds a score 59 out of 100 based on reviews from 12 critics, indicating "mixed or average reviews".

=== Ratings ===
No. in series	No. in season	Episode	Air date	Time slot (ET)	Rating/Share (18–49)	Viewers (million)
1	1	"Pilot"	June 10, 2014	Tuesdays; 9:00 p.m.	0.5	1.34
2	2	"Help Wanted"	June 17, 2014	Tuesdays; 9:00 p.m.	0.5	1.11
3	3	"Blood Cancer Sex Carrots"	June 24, 2014	Tuesdays; 9:00 p.m.	0.5	1.11
4	4	"I'll Sleep When I'm Dead"	July 1, 2014	Tuesdays; 9:00 p.m.	0.5	1.12
5	5	"The Family That Lies Together"	July 8, 2014	Tuesdays; 9:00 p.m.	0.5	1.21
6	6	"Clear Minds, Full Lives, Can't Eat"	July 15, 2014	Tuesdays; 9:00 p.m.	0.5	1.19
7	7	"Unplanned Parenthood"	July 22, 2014	Tuesdays; 9:00 p.m.	0.5	1.13
8	8	"Death Becomes Her"	July 29, 2014	Tuesdays; 9:00 p.m.	0.4	1.08
9	9	"What to Expect When You're Expecting Chemo"	August 5, 2014	Tuesdays; 9:00 p.m.	0.5	1.11
10	10	"Finding Chemo"	August 12, 2014	Tuesdays; 9:00 p.m.	0.6	1.30
11	11	"Locks of Love"	December 9, 2014	Tuesdays; 9:00 p.m.	0.5	1.22
12	12	"Next April"	January 19, 2015	Mondays; 9:00 p.m.	0.4	1.02
13	13	"Guess Who's Coming to Donate?"	January 26, 2015	Mondays; 9:00 p.m.	0.3	0.78
14	14	"Cancer Friends with Benefits"	February 2, 2015	Mondays; 9:00 p.m.	0.3	0.78
15	15	"April Just Wants to Have Fun"	February 9, 2015	Mondays; 9:00 p.m.	0.4	0.91
16	16	"The Big Leagues"	February 16, 2015	Mondays; 9:00 p.m.	0.3	0.81
17	17	"Model Behavior"	February 23, 2015	Mondays; 9:00 p.m.	0.2	0.80
18	18	"Rest in Peace"	March 2, 2015	Mondays; 9:00 p.m.	0.2	0.73
19	19	"Life, Actually"	March 9, 2015	Mondays; 9:00 p.m.	0.2	0.64
20	20	"No News Is Bad News"	March 16, 2015	Mondays; 9:00 p.m.	0.2	0.69
21	21	"One Day"	March 23, 2015	Mondays; 9:00 p.m.	0.4	0.93
22	1	"A View from the Ledge"	July 6, 2015	Mondays; 9:00 p.m.	0.3	0.72
23	2	"The Age of Consent"	July 13, 2015	Mondays; 9:00 p.m.	0.3	0.79
24	3	"Life of Brenna"	July 20, 2015	Mondays; 9:00 p.m.	0.3	0.72
25	4	"Truly Madly Deeply"	July 27, 2015	Mondays; 9:00 p.m.	0.2	0.60
26	5	"The Domino Effect"	August 3, 2015	Mondays; 9:00 p.m.	0.2	0.61
27	6	"The Last W"	August 10, 2015	Mondays; 9:00 p.m.	0.3	0.75
28	7	"As Long As We Both Shall Live"	August 17, 2015	Mondays; 9:00 p.m.	0.3	0.75
29	8	"The Ghost in You"	August 24, 2015	Mondays; 9:00 p.m.	0.3	0.77
30	9	"Wild Thing"	August 31, 2015	Mondays; 9:00 p.m.	0.3	0.64
31	10	"A Bottle of Secrets"	September 7, 2015	Mondays; 9:00 p.m.	0.2	0.59
32	11	"First Person"	September 14, 2015	Mondays; 9:00 p.m.	0.3	0.68
33	12	"Ready or Not"	September 21, 2015	Mondays; 9:00 p.m.	0.2	0.54
34	13	"La Dolce Vita"	September 28, 2015	Mondays; 9:00 p.m.	0.2	0.49

=== Accolades ===
Year	Award	Category	Nominee(s)	Result	Ref.
2014	Teen Choice Award	Choice TV Breakout Show	Chasing Life	Nominated	
2014	Teen Choice Award	Choice Summer TV Star: Female	Italia Ricci	Nominated	
2015	Golden Maple Awards	Newcomer of the Year in a TV Series Broadcast in the US	Italia Ricci	Nominated	
2015	Teen Choice Awards	Choice Summer TV Show	Chasing Life	Nominated	
2015	Teen Choice Awards	Choice Summer TV Star: Female	Italia Ricci	Nominated	
