= Among the Beasts =

- Theatrical release poster
- Directed by: Matthew Newton
- Written by: Matthew Newton
- Produced by: Ally Beans; Tory Kittles
- Starring: Tory Kittles; Libe Barer; Sarunas J. Jackson; Jon Bass; Jim Norton; Imani Lewis
- Cinematography: Carmen Cabana
- Edited by: Betsy Kagen
- Music by: Ben Cura
- Production companies: Menagerie Films; Cavalry Independent; Cubby House Pictures
- Distributed by: Gravitas Ventures
- Release date: 10 February 2023 (United States)
- Running time: 93 minutes
- Country: United States
- Language: English

Among the Beasts is a 2023 American mystery thriller written and directed by Matthew Newton. The film was released in the United States by Gravitas Ventures on February 10, 2023. The cast includes Tory Kittles, Libe Barer, Sarunas J. Jackson, Jon Bass, Jim Norton, and Imani Lewis.

Set in New York City, the film follows a former Marine who teams up with Lola, the daughter of a drug lord, to rescue her kidnapped cousin, drawing him into a world of human trafficking and organized crime.

== Plot ==
Former U.S. Marine LT is haunted by a past failure involving the disappearance of a young girl. Living a solitary life, he is approached by Lola, the daughter of a jailed gangster, whose cousin has been kidnapped. Because of her family's criminal ties, she is unwilling to contact the police.

Though reluctant at first, LT agrees to help Lola track down the kidnappers. The pair form an uneasy alliance and begin to piece together clues, navigating the dangerous underworld of organized crime and trafficking. As they delve deeper, LT must confront his personal demons and use his combat experience to protect Lola and pursue justice for the missing girl. Their search tests both their resolve and trust in one another while forcing LT to reckon with his own sense of redemption and purpose.

== Cast ==
- Tory Kittles as LT
- Libe Barer as Lola
- Sarunas J. Jackson as AJ
- Jon Bass as Nathan
- Jim Norton as Jordy
- Imani Lewis as Bella
- Grant Shaud as Detective Mulberry
- Jeff Imada as Bo
- Alex Huynh as Al

== Release ==
Among The Beasts distributed by Gravitas Ventures on February 10, 2023, via limited theatrical release and VOD. The film was subsequently made available to stream on Starz.

== Reception ==
Among The Beasts received mixed to positive reviews from film critics. Jake Sokolsky in a review for Punch Drunk Critics awarded the film 3/5 stars, noting "the performances, pacing, and the script leave Among The Beasts an uneven experience. Kittles shines as LT, showing his range. His mannerisms and demeanor just simply work. Other performances left a lot to be desired. The script certainly has its moments weaving a mix of pain and anguish with genuine comedic moments. However numerous scenes feature dialogue that comes off as unnatural, which takes the audience out of a scene and hinders certain performances." However, Sokolsky observes that "Overall, the good outweighs the bad."

Julian Roman of MovieWeb offered a similarly mixed review, criticizing Newton's writing and direction while praising Kittles performance, noting "Among the Beasts has LT coming out of darkness. This thematic progression stumbles. Parts of the film are poorly lit and lack definition. This would normally be a fatal blow. Kittles strong performance holds your interest to an unexpected conclusion. I'm on board for further missions with LT."

Mark Dujsik of Mark Reviews Movies was more enthusiastic, awarding the film 3/4 stars, noting "The film is spare and considered in a way that emphasizes both the moral morass of this situation and the desperation of its characters—for answers and for some sense of redemption. Among the Beasts does move toward a standard standoff (although it's played as a battle of wits and a stealthy rescue, which is mostly jeopardized by the heightened emotions of the scenario), but because of Newton's expectation-breaking storytelling and Kittles' committed performance, the film earns it."
