= BookTube =

YouTube book community

BookTube is a subcommunity on YouTube that focuses on books and literature. The BookTube community has, to date, reached hundreds of thousands of viewers worldwide. While the majority of BookTubers focus on Young Adult literature, many address other genres. BookTube videos also generally follow a set of formats, often drawing upon the wider "bookish" culture and lexicon. There is a distinct set of recognizable faces within BookTube as well as some content created by the publishing community. BookTube is often used to advertise new publications and is cited as a source of growth for the publishing industry.

== Background ==
Though it lacks an exact origin, the BookTube community began around 2010 and grew exponentially throughout the 2010s. Christine Riccio (PolandBananasBooks) is often known as a pioneer of BookTube and became one of the first BookTubers to gain a large following. Today, many channels have thousands (and sometimes hundreds of thousands) of subscribers. BookTube channels exist globally in English, Portuguese, Italian, French, and Spanish, among other languages.

BookTubers often create videos reviewing and discussing young adult literature, but other genres, such as classics, science fiction, fantasy, Superhero, Horror, Supernatural, Paranormal Romance, literary fiction, children's literature, comics, romance, and non-fiction, are also represented.

Currently, the most subscribed BookTubers include Jack Edwards, Isabella Lubrano (Ler Antes de Morrer), Tatiana Feltrin, Cindy Pham (withcindy), Hannah Azerang (A Clockwork Reader), Pam Gonçalves, Ariel Bissett, Christine Riccio (PolandBananasBooks), Kat O'Keefe (katytastic), Clau R. (ClauReadsBooks), Dakota Warren, Carley Thorne (uncarley), Jesse George (Jesse the Reader), and Daniel Greene.

== BookTube and the publishing industry ==
The BookTube community has been noted by social media consultants as a potential source of revenue growth for publishing houses. Publishers themselves began to break into the BookTube community around the time of its inception. Since then, they have advertised using book trailers, contracts with existing BookTubers, and their own BookTube web series, such as PaperCuts or Book Studio 16. Still, publishers often utilize independent BookTubers to advertise their books through word of mouth, usually by providing ARCs (Advanced Reader Copies). These ARCs will often be shipped with other merchandise designed to increase the hype surrounding the release. Most of these ARCs are sent from the "Big Five" publishers: Hachette, Harper-Collins, MacMillan, Penguin Random House, and Simon-Schuster. This means that one book will often be reviewed many times by the BookTube community.

== Types of videos ==
There are several different types of videos that BookTubers film. Some are reviews, with or without spoilers, which detail what BookTubers have liked or disliked about specific books. BookTubers often review Advanced Reader Copies (ARCs) that are provided by book publishers who may wish to advertise using word of mouth. BookTubers also make "haul" videos where they discuss their purchases from a trip to the bookstore or give an overview of the books that they've bought within a period of time. Conversely, "unhaul" videos are videos where BookTubers talk about any books that they are removing from their collection.

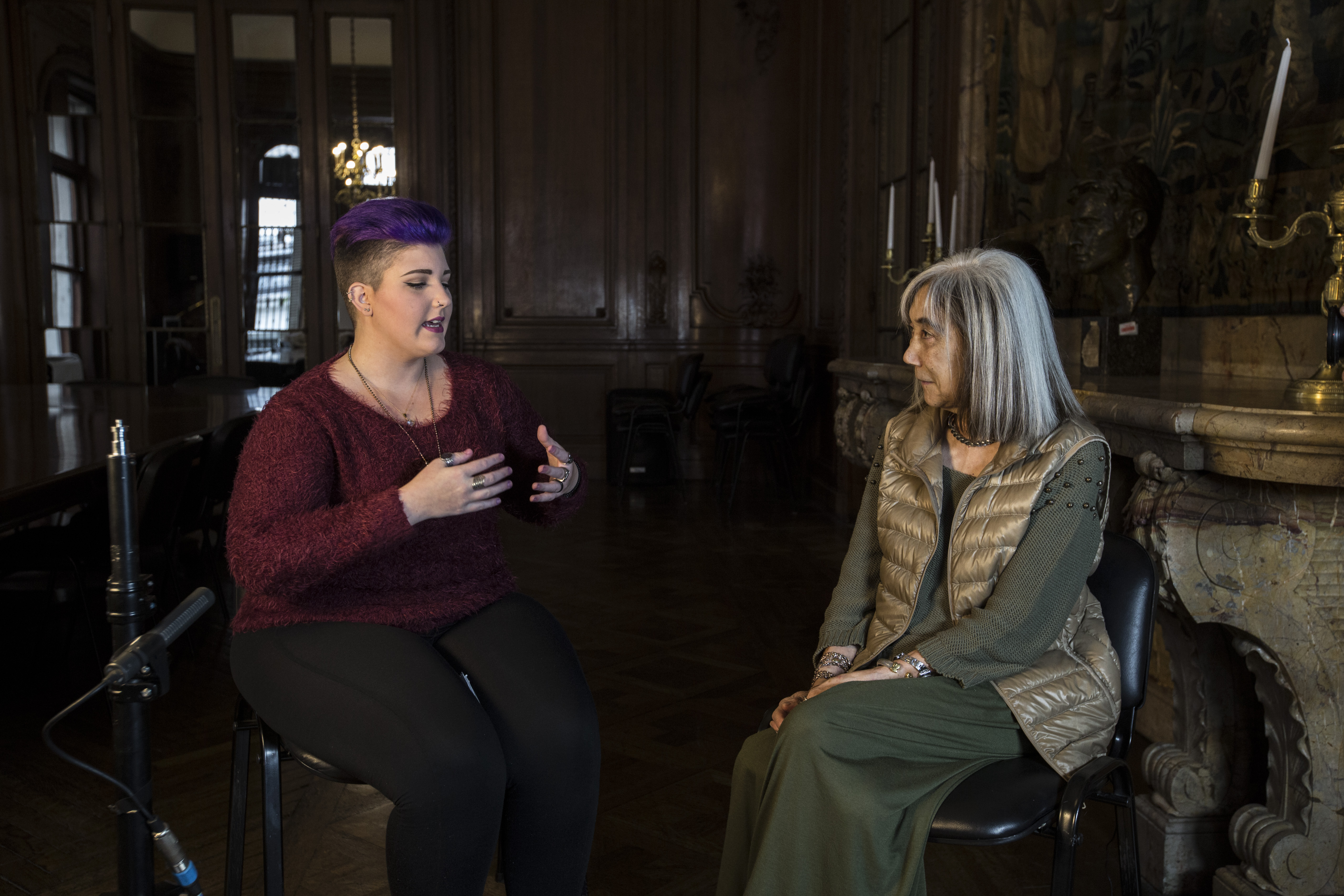
BookTuber Juli Ferraro interviews María Kodama, wife of writer Jorge Luis Borges, in a celebration of Reader's Day.

Other common types of videos include:

- Bookshelf tours, in which BookTubers show the viewer their bookshelves, usually describing each book as they go along.
- Readalongs, in which BookTubers choose a book and encourage their audience to follow along.
- TBR (to be read) videos, in which BookTubers list what they intend to read in the immediate future.
- Wrap-up videos, which list books the BookTuber has read in a particular period of time, typically a week, month, or year.
- Tag videos, which consist of a series of questions or challenges around a theme which the BookTuber answers, then tags other BookTubers to answer.
- Discussion videos, which address themes across books or issues that arise in the BookTube community.
- Collaborations, in which two or more BookTubers will join in a video, often playing a game or doing a tag.
- Interviews with authors.
- Unboxings of book subscription boxes such as, Book of the Month, OwlCrate, FairyLoot, or LitJoy.
- Book recommendations

== Traditions and culture ==
BookTube, rather than a collection of disparate videos, is often considered a community of video makers and watchers with its own culture. There is a shared vocabulary (largely drawn from the wider bookish community), intertextuality (whereby BookTubers react and respond to other BookTubers), common traditions, and some broadly shared values.

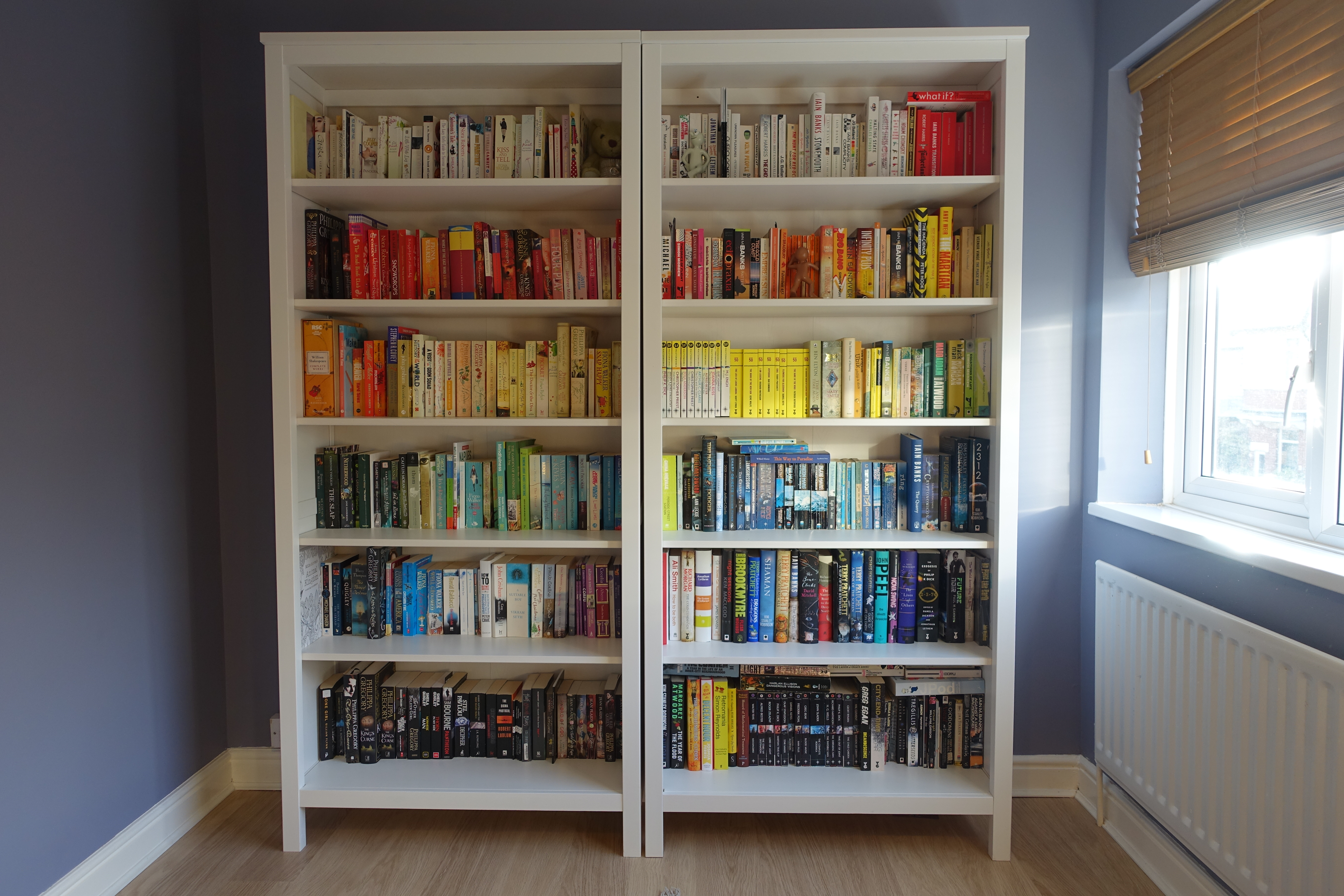
A classic rainbow shelfie is a staple of the bookish community, and is also a favorite BookTube backdrop.

=== Vocabulary ===
- Bookternet: the network of book and reading related internet enclaves, including book bloggers, book podcasts, BookTube, Bookstagram, BookTok, Goodreads, and Reblog Bookclub. Content creators in this space are sometimes referred to as "Bookfluencers".
- TBR: to be read. These books can be: the next book a BookTuber will read, all unread books owned by a BookTuber, or books, not necessarily owned, that a BookTuber wants to read.
- DNF: did not finish. A book that a BookTuber chose not to complete
- Shelfie: a "selfie", or picture, of a bookshelf. Usually shelfies are specifically organized in some theme.
- ARC: advanced reader copy. A not-for-sale copy of a yet-to-be-published book provided free by the publisher for publicity purposes. The aim of these is to promote a book through word of mouth prior to release. Also known as an advance reader edition or ARE.
- Reading Slump: a period of time in which a BookTuber lacks the inspiration to read, or when reading is much slower than usual
- Shipping: to support/endorse a relationship between fictional characters

=== Traditions ===
- Readathon: an event during which participants read together over a defined period of time.
- Shout outs: where BookTubers recommend other BookTube channels in their videos.
- NaNoWriMo: Many BookTubers, who are also avid writers, tend to participate in this challenge during which one attempts to write a 50,000 word novel in the month of November.
- Read-alongs: where a BookTuber will read a certain amount of a book per week so that viewers can follow along and add discussion.

Much of BookTube and its culture overlaps with the broader YouTube writing community. It is common for BookTubers to also be writers, and their videos can include writing advice or author logs. Individual BookTubers have had an impact on the community as they write, publish, and promote their own books on their channel.

Outside of YouTube, BookTubers can be found at book and YouTube conventions like YallFest, BookCon, and VidCon.

== Financial aspects ==
BookTubers with a large following earn revenue off of the videos they make. Through monetization, affiliate links and sponsorships, BookTubers earn money directly from their views and subscribers. While there is money being brought in, it has also been cited that there is consumerism that goes alongside BookTube. Popular creators have been credited with saying that there is pressure to have full, gorgeous bookshelves with little concern regarding the number of books actually being read.

== Diversity on BookTube ==
The lack of diverse BookTubers is considered a problem in the community. Black creators rack up less views and have fewer subscribers compared to their White counterparts. As a way to call out this lack of diversity, outspoken BookTubers create videos highlighting the issue where they discuss ways to combat it. Creators also call out this lack of diversity within the publishing industry by centering videos around, or only reading books that represent marginalized groups.

== See also ==
- BookTok
- Twitterature
