= Silver Banshee =

DC Comics villain

- The Siobhan McDougal incarnation of Silver Banshee as depicted in Superman #17 (March 1988). Art by John Byrne.

Publication information
- Publisher: DC Comics
- First appearance: Action Comics #595 (December 1987)
- Created by: John Byrne

In-story information
- Alter ego: Siobhan McDougal; Siobhan Smythe
- Species: Metahuman
- Team affiliations: Secret Society of Super Villains
- Abilities: Banshee curse empowerment granting: Superhuman strength, durability, and speed; Spirit possession; Death stare; Flight; Fear projection; Pyrokinesis; Sound manipulation granting: Death wail; Sound immunity; Accelerated healing; Teleportation; Multilingualism

Silver Banshee is the name of two supervillains appearing in American comic books published by DC Comics, with both primarily as opponents of Superman. The first, Siobhan McDougal, made her debut in Action Comics #595 while the second, Siobhan Smythe, debuted during the New 52 in Supergirl vol. 6 #7.

Both McDougal and Smythe have appeared in DC Comics media outside of comics, with Odessa Rae portraying McDougal in Smallville and Italia Ricci portraying Smythe in Supergirl.

== Publication history ==
Silver Banshee's debut in Action Comics #595 (December 1987), cover by Byrne.

Silver Banshee first appeared in Action Comics #595 and was created by John Byrne.

== Fictional character biography ==
=== Siobhan McDougal ===
Siobhan McDougal was the first-born child of Garrett McDougal, the patriarch of an old Gaelic clan that has occupied an island midway between Scotland and Ireland for a thousand generations. On that island is Castle Broen, where first-born McDougals undergo a ritual to prove themselves worthy to lead the clan. When Siobhan was young, she traveled the world, only returning to Castle Broen after her father's death. Her uncle Seamus determined that no woman would lead the clan and intended her brother Bevan to become the new patriarch. She went ahead with the family ritual by herself, which involved calling on supernatural forces for power. She was interrupted by Bevan, and the distraction proved disastrous as she was dragged into an infernal netherworld. An entity called the Crone granted her powers and the ability to return to Earth as Silver Banshee, but demanded payment in the form of an occult book that belonged to her father. She found that her father's book collection had been shipped off for sale in the United States. Banshee's quest brought her to Metropolis. Killing anyone that stood in the way of her search attracted the attention of Superman, who was able to defeat her when he realised that Banshee could only kill a person that she believed to be alive; Banshee was unable to affect a potential victim that she mistook for a previous victim. By faking his death, Superman was able to enlist Martian Manhunter to attack Banshee by posing as Superman's ghost. Unable to defeat Superman, she chose to retreat and continue her mission at a later date.

Silver Banshee returned to Metropolis twice more, but was halted both times by Superman. It was Batman who finally found the book among some stolen goods in Gotham City. Superman brought the book to Castle Broen where he was confronted by Silver Banshee. The Crone appeared at the castle, and after an enigmatic warning to Superman, dragged the Banshee, Bevan, and Seamus off to her Netherworld.

In Leesburg, Supergirl rescued Silver Banshee from Satanus' Netherworld when the chaos flow brought the river Styx to the town. Silver Banshee was left in a confused state, eventually going back to her psychotic persona and using Supergirl's friend Mattie as a host while rampaging on the streets. Mattie and Silver Banshee thus proceeded to nearby Schnaffenburg where Mattie tried to get revenge on Gerald McFee, who killed her brother during "Final Night" while in thrall to Gorilla Grodd. Supergirl calmed Silver Banshee, separating Mattie from her, which led to Silver Banshee temporarily vanishing.

Silver Banshee was one of the final four villains - along with Bizarro, Mongul, and the Master Jailer - to be sent against Superman by Manchester Black, the latter using his powers to make Banshee and Bizarro sane enough to tactically outthink Superman, also granting Banshee awareness of his Kryptonian name so that she could use her magic against him more effectively. Despite this, Superman was able to defeat the four, forcing Mongul to expend his energy.

Silver Banshee later joined the Secret Society headed by Alexander Luthor Jr. She was one of the members who turned on Black Adam when Luthor needed him for his machine. She also took part in the Battle of Metropolis.

Inspector Henderson begins investigating a case his old mentor was never able to close, and thinks it has to do with items Silver Banshee needs to lift her curse. Henderson finds his mentor had the item, but it imbeds itself in Henderson's hand, allowing Silver Banshee to track him. Silver Banshee shows up and fights Supergirl, but Supergirl opens a package from Henderson and is possessed by a Banshee hybrid. Supergirl tells Silver Banshee they hid the artifacts in people, to keep them hidden from her. Apparently all the items were hidden not as a curse, but as a test for prospective clan leaders. Henderson punches Banshee-Supergirl, which is effective because of the artifact in his hand. Supergirl tries to exorcise the spirits possessing her but fails. Henderson realizes the spirits are tied to the artifacts and can be used against them. He then stabs his hand and breaks Supergirl free from her spirits. Silver Banshee disperse the spirits and removes the artifacts from Henderson's hand, stating that she is indebted to him.

=== Siobhan Smythe ===
In 2011, The New 52 rebooted the DC universe. Siobhan Smythe first appears in Supergirl vol. 6 #7 as a girl from Dublin who had immigrated to the United States to start a new life after her mother died, and to escape her father (the also-dead Black Banshee). She befriends Supergirl, and stands up to the National Guard when they attack her. Siobhan invites Kara to live with her, and brings her along to a cafe where she performs music when the Black Banshee attacks, prompting her to transform into Silver Banshee. The two fight Black Banshee only for Supergirl to be absorbed into the villain's body. While inside, Supergirl relives nightmarish versions of her own memories and encounters Tom Smythe, Siobhan's brother. He explains how the Banshee is a curse passed down along his family line and how Black Banshee had plans for his daughter to join him in conquering the world. Tom sacrificed himself in Siobhan's place, hoping it would end the curse, but only managed to delay it. Supergirl escapes and defeats Black Banshee; afterwards, Siohan reverts to normal and is reunited with her brother.

In Dawn of DC, Silver Banshee begins dating Jimmy Olsen.

== Powers and abilities ==
Both incarnations of Silver Banshee possess preternatural levels of strength and resistance to injury powerful enough to prove physically challenging for super-powered Kryptonians like Superman and Supergirl. While not completely invulnerable, they are able to wound Kryptonians to a limited degree when they exert their full strength. While physically powerful, a Banshee's signature weapon is her sonic scream or "death wail". Her cry kills anyone who hears it, provided she knows their full name, reducing them to desiccated husks as the scream drains their life-force to strengthen the Banshee, akin to a succubus or psychic vampire.

As Siobhan Smythe of The New 52 continuity, Silver Banshee has exhibited an affinity for "omnilingualism" - able to instinctively speak any language fluently from the first moment she hears it, including being able to commune with animals.

== Other versions ==
- Silver Banshee makes a cameo appearance in JLA: The Nail as a prisoner of Cadmus Labs.
- Silver Banshee appears in JLA/Avengers.

== In other media ==
=== Television ===
Italia Ricci as Siobhan Smythe / Silver Banshee as depicted in Supergirl.

- Siobhan McDougal appears in the Smallville episode "Escape", portrayed by Odessa Rae. This version is a deceased Gaelic heroine who was cursed, placed in the underworld, and needs to possess a host.
- The Siobhan McDougal incarnation of Silver Banshee appears in Justice League Unlimited, voiced by Kim Mai Guest. This version is a member of Gorilla Grodd's Secret Society. Prior to and during the episode "Alive!", Lex Luthor takes control of the Society, but Grodd mounts a mutiny. Silver Banshee sides with the latter, but is knocked out by Star Sapphire and killed off-screen by Darkseid along with Grodd's other loyalists.
- A character based on Silver Banshee named Scream Queen appears in the teaser for the Batman: The Brave and the Bold episode "Trials of the Demon!".
- The Siobhan Smythe incarnation of Silver Banshee appears in Supergirl, portrayed by Italia Ricci. This version's abilities are derived from a familial curse tied to a banshee spirit that can only be quelled if she kills the source of her rage. She joins forces with Livewire in an attempt to kill Supergirl and Cat Grant, only to be defeated and incarcerated in National City Prison's metahuman wing.
- The Siobhan McDougal incarnation of Silver Banshee appears in the DC Super Hero Girls (2019) episode "#SchoolGhoul", voiced by Cristina Milizia. This version was chosen to lead her family's clan centuries ago in medieval Scotland before her jealous brother stole their family heirloom and killed her. Centuries later, his descendant became headmaster of the McDougal Academy, a Metropolis girls' boarding school, which Siobhan haunts in search of the heirloom. While fighting Katana in the present, Siobhan ends up in the latter's sword, where she reveals her history and quest. After she confronts the headmaster, he returns the heirloom and apologizes, allowing Siobhan to leave McDougal Academy in peace.
- The Siobhan McDougal incarnation of Silver Banshee appears in My Adventures with Superman, voiced by Catherine Taber. This version is a leading member of Intergang and sister of fellow member Mist whose abilities are derived from a sound-amplifying helmet.

=== Film ===
- The Siobhan McDougal incarnation of Silver Banshee makes a non-speaking appearance in Superman/Batman: Public Enemies.
- The Siobhan McDougal incarnation of Silver Banshee appears in Batman Unlimited: Monster Mayhem, voiced by Kari Wuhrer.
- According to concept art, Silver Banshee was originally planned to appear in The Lego Batman Movie.
- The Siobhan Smythe incarnation of Silver Banshee appears in Suicide Squad: Hell to Pay, voiced by Julie Nathanson. She was hired by Professor Zoom to help him retrieve a "Get Out of Hell Free" card in exchange for his help in getting revenge on her former clan for banishing her, only to be killed by Killer Frost.

=== Video games ===
- The Siobhan Smythe incarnation of Silver Banshee appears as a playable character in DC Unchained.
- The Siobhan McDougal incarnation of Silver Banshee appears as a playable character in DC Legends.
- The Siobhan McDougal incarnation of Silver Banshee appears as a character summon in Scribblenauts Unmasked: A DC Comics Adventure.
- An unidentified incarnation of Silver Banshee appears as a playable character in the mobile version of Injustice 2.
- The Siobhan McDougal incarnation of Silver Banshee appears as a playable character in Lego DC Super-Villains, voiced again by Julie Nathanson.

=== Miscellaneous ===
The Siobhan McDougal incarnation of Silver Banshee appears in DC Super Hero Girls (2015) as a member of Super Hero High School's debate team and a rock vocalist in the school's band club.

== See also ==
- List of Superman enemies
