= Imani Lewis =

American actress

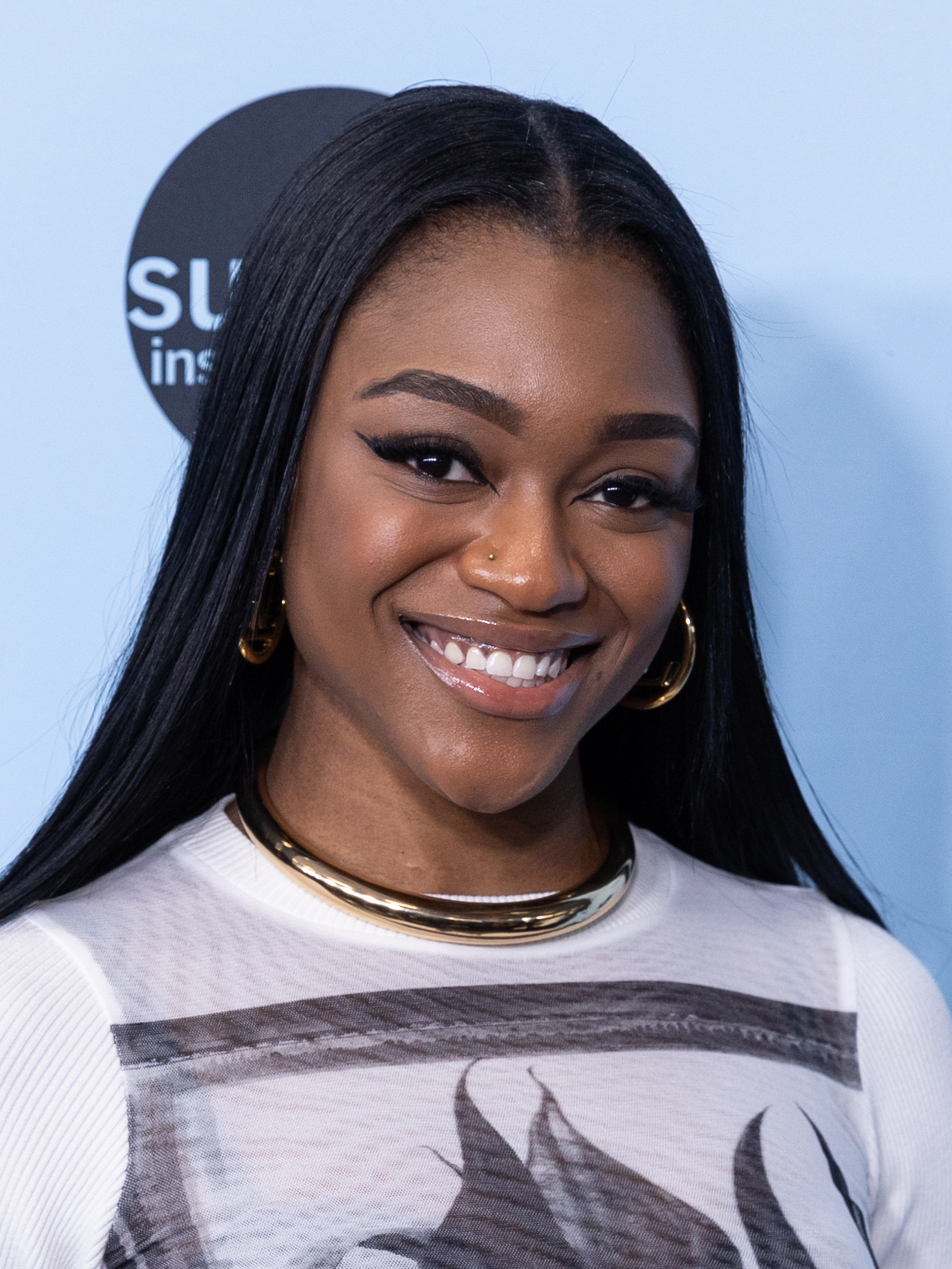
- Lewis at the 2025 Sundance Film Festival
- Born: April 12, 1999 (age 27); New York City, New York
- Occupation: Actress
- Years active: 2017–present

Imani Lewis (born April 12, 1999) is an American actress. She is best known for playing Calliope Burns in the supernatural teen series First Kill and Charmaine in the crime drama series Hightown.

== Early life ==
Lewis was born in New York City on April 12 1999.

== Career ==
Lewis made her on-screen debut in the musical drama series The Get Down. She also appeared in Alternatino with Arturo Castro, and Wu-Tang: An American Saga early on in her career Her first recurring role came playing Karen in the music drama series Star. Her first big role came playing Calliope Burns in the supernatural teen series First Kill. Her character is a lesbian who gets into a relationship with Sarah Catherine Hook. She played a lead role in the crime drama series Hightown.

== Personal life ==
She cites Wesley Snipes character Blade as a major influence. She took kickboxing lessons for a couple of years. Her favourite TV show growing up was Sabrina the Teenage Witch.

== Filmography ==
=== Film ===
Year	Title	Role	Notes
2017	Hearsay	Alex	Short
2018	Eighth Grade	Aniyah	
2019	Premature	Shonte	
2020	The Forty-Year-Old Version	Elaine	
2020	Farewell Amor	Michelle	
2020	Vampires vs. the Bronx	Gloria	
2021	Shoplifters of the World	Babs	
2021	Killer Among Us	Ricki Fennel	
2023	Among the Beasts	Bella	
2023	Miguel Wants to Fight	Cass	
2025	Ricky	Jaz	
2025	Haint	Kassie	Short

=== Television ===
Year	Title	Role	Notes
2017	The Get Down	Zulu Girl Tanya	3 episodes
2017-2018	Star	Karen	8 episodes
2019	Alternatino with Arturo Castro	Girl	Episode; The Dreamer
2019	Wu-Tang: An American Saga	Roxanne Shante	Episode; Box in Hand
2021-2022	The Equalizer	Kisha Griffin	2 episodes
2022	First Kill	Calliope Burns	8 episodes
2022	Flatbush Misdemeanors	Honor	Episode; Obigeli
2023	Blue Bloods	Shayla Alexander	Episode; Close to Home
2020-2024	Hightown	Charmaine	16 episodes
