= Aubin Wise =

American actress

- Born: May 8, 1988 (age 37)
- Occupation: Actress
- Years active: 2015–present

Aubin Wise is an American actress. She is best known for playing Talia in the drama series First Kill.

== Early life ==
Wise grew up in Vacaville, California. While growing up she took private dance lessons. She became interested in acting after seeing a friend perform in a Solano Youth Theatre production of Oliver!.

== Career ==
One of Wise' first career appearances was in the FX comedy drama series Atlanta. Her biggest role of her career has been playing Talia in the drama series First Kill. She made an appearance in two episodes of the mystery drama series Harlan Coben's Shelter. She made her broadway debut in 2022 as Peggy Schuyler and Maria Reynolds in Hamilton.

== Personal life ==
She has a son named Kai James.

== Filmography ==
=== Film ===
Year	Title	Role	Notes
2018	Summer Vacation	Church Lady	Short
2018	The Finest	Serena Kendrick-Archer	Short
2021	Dimland	Vera	

=== Television ===
Year	Title	Role	Notes
2015	The Under 5ers	Hostess	Episode; Brunch
2016	Atlanta	Jayde	Episode; Value
2022	First Kill	Talia	8 episodes
2023	Harlan Coben's Shelter	Girl	2 episodes
