= Vicious (novel) =

Novel by V. E. Schwab

- First US edition cover
- Author: V. E. Schwab
- Cover artist: Victo Ngai
- Language: English
- Genre: Fantasy
- Publisher: Tor Books
- Publication date: September 24, 2013
- Publication place: United States
- Media type: Print (hardback & paperback)
- Pages: 368
- ISBN: 0-765-335344

Vicious is the first novel in the Villains Trilogy by American author V. E. Schwab. Published by Tor Books in 2013, Vicious follows two college roommates who learn how to create superhuman abilities but later become archenemies.

== Plot summary ==
Victor Vale and Eli Cardale begin as college roommates and discover that near-death experiences, under the right conditions, can create extraordinaries (EOs): superhuman abilities. Eli and Victor decide to become EO's themselves. After Victor fails the first attempt, Eli is successful in turning himself into an EO. When Victor tries to create his abilities, things go wrong and Angie, Eli's girlfriend, dies. Victor is thrown under the bus by his friend and is sent to prison. 10 years later, Eli, now under the name Eli Ever, has become convinced EO's are no longer human and has started a crusade to kill every EO he can find. Victor has broken out of jail, with fellow inmate Mitch, with the plan to get revenge on Eli.

== Reception ==
The Guardian called Vicious "a brilliant exploration of the superhero mythos and a riveting revenge thriller". It received a starred review from Publishers Weekly, which called Schwab's characters "vital and real, never reduced to simple archetypes" and praised the book as "a rare superhero novel as epic and gripping as any classic comic". Publishers Weekly also named Vicious one of its best books of 2013 for SF/Fantasy/Horror. The American Library Association's Reference and User Services Association likewise awarded it the top fantasy book in their 2014 Reading List.

In late 2013, the rights for a film adaptation of Vicious were bought jointly by Story Mining & Supply Co and Ridley Scott's Scott Free Productions. In May 2014, Alexander Felix was hired to write the screenplay.

== Sequels ==
The sequel to Vicious, titled Vengeful, was released on September 25, 2018. A third book to the series, Victorious, was released on October 6, 2026.
