= Jack Edwards (internet personality) =

English YouTuber (born 1998)

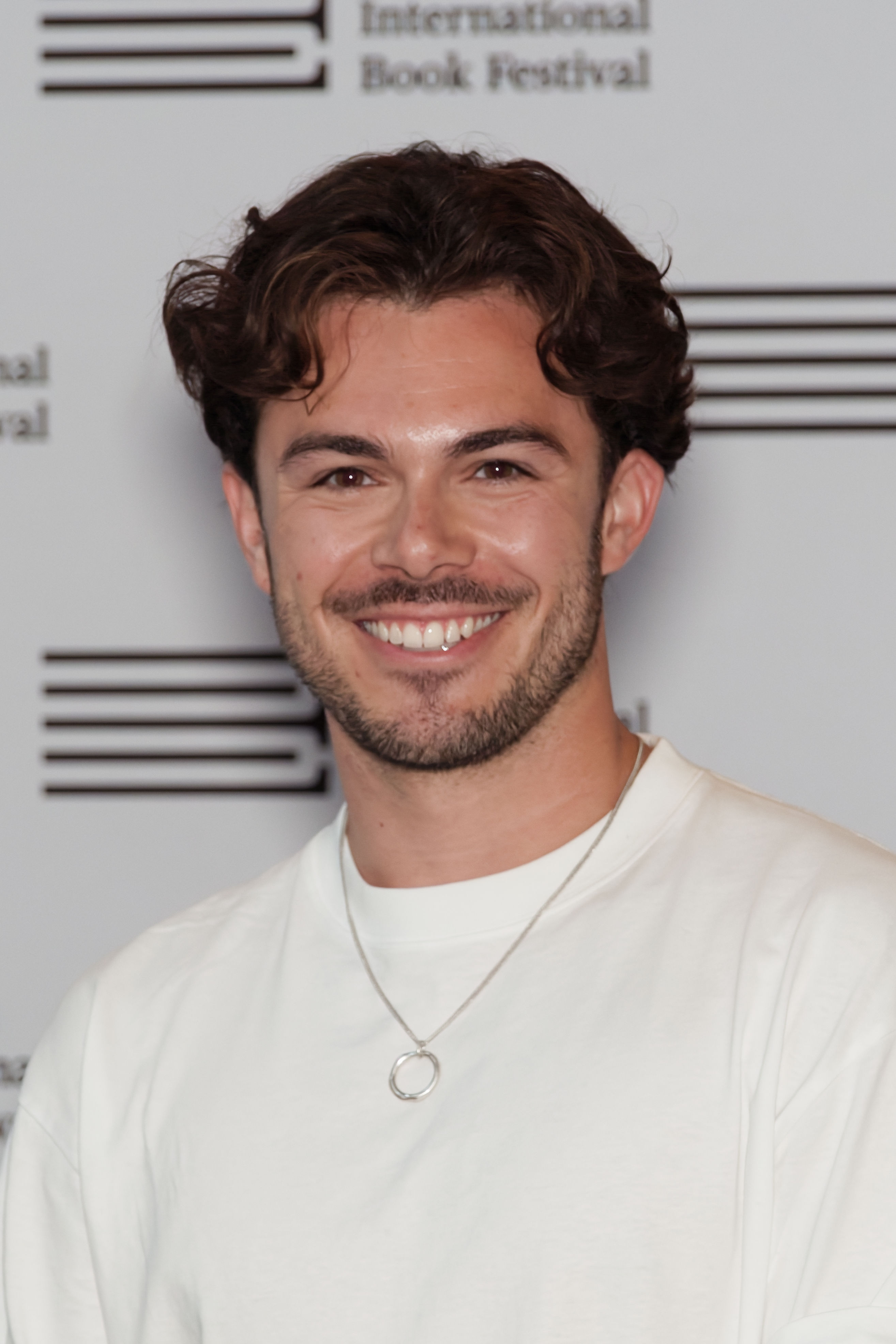
- Edwards in 2026
- Born: 18 October 1998 (age 28); Brighton, England
- Education: St Cuthbert's Society, Durham (BA)
- Occupations: YouTuber; author

YouTube information
- Channel: Jack Edwards
- Years active: 2016–present
- Genre: Books
- Subscribers: 2.1 million
- Views: 177 million
- Last updated: 14 July 2026
- Website: www.thejackexperience.co.uk

Jack Benjamin Edwards (born 18 October 1998) is an English YouTuber, social media influencer and author. He has built an online following posting videos about books, popular culture and university life since 2016, and is associated with the internet sub-communities of BookTube, BookTok and EduTube. As of July 2026, he has over 2.1 million subscribers on YouTube and over 2 million followers across TikTok, Goodreads and Instagram.

== Early life and education ==
Jack Benjamin Edwards was born on 18 October 1998 in Brighton, England. He attended the University of Durham (St Cuthbert's Society), where he earned a First Class BA in English literature. He was the first member of his family to attend university.

== Career ==
Edwards registered his YouTube account @jack_edwards in 2014, gaining prominence in 2017 for documenting his experiences at St Cuthbert's. Then-Principal, Elizabeth Archibald, would attribute the popularity of Edwards' vlogs to St Cuthbert's first oversubscription, referring to it as "the Jack Edwards effect".

As of 2026, Edwards' main YouTube channel has 1.7 million subscribers and 196 million views, where his content focuses on activities such as reading the book recommendations of popular actors, musicians, and reality stars,.

In 2020, Edwards published The Uni-Verse: The Ultimate Guide to Surviving University with Harper Collins, while in 2021 he launched the stationery company Ink Outside the Box. In 2023, Edwards announced that he would be closing down the company.

In 2023, Edwards was announced as a "thinker in residence" for that year's Hay Festival, focusing on digital storytelling and online media. As part of his role, he interviewed Alice Oseman. That year, he also hosted the 2023 Booker Prize official livestream at Old Billingsgate and the 2024 International Booker Prize at Tate Modern.

In 2025, Edwards launched an online book club called 'Inklings'. In the same year, he was also appointed as a Contributory Literary Editor for Esquire (UK Edition), and was included in the European Forbes 30 Under 30 Media and Marketing list.
