= V. E. Schwab =

American writer (born 1987)

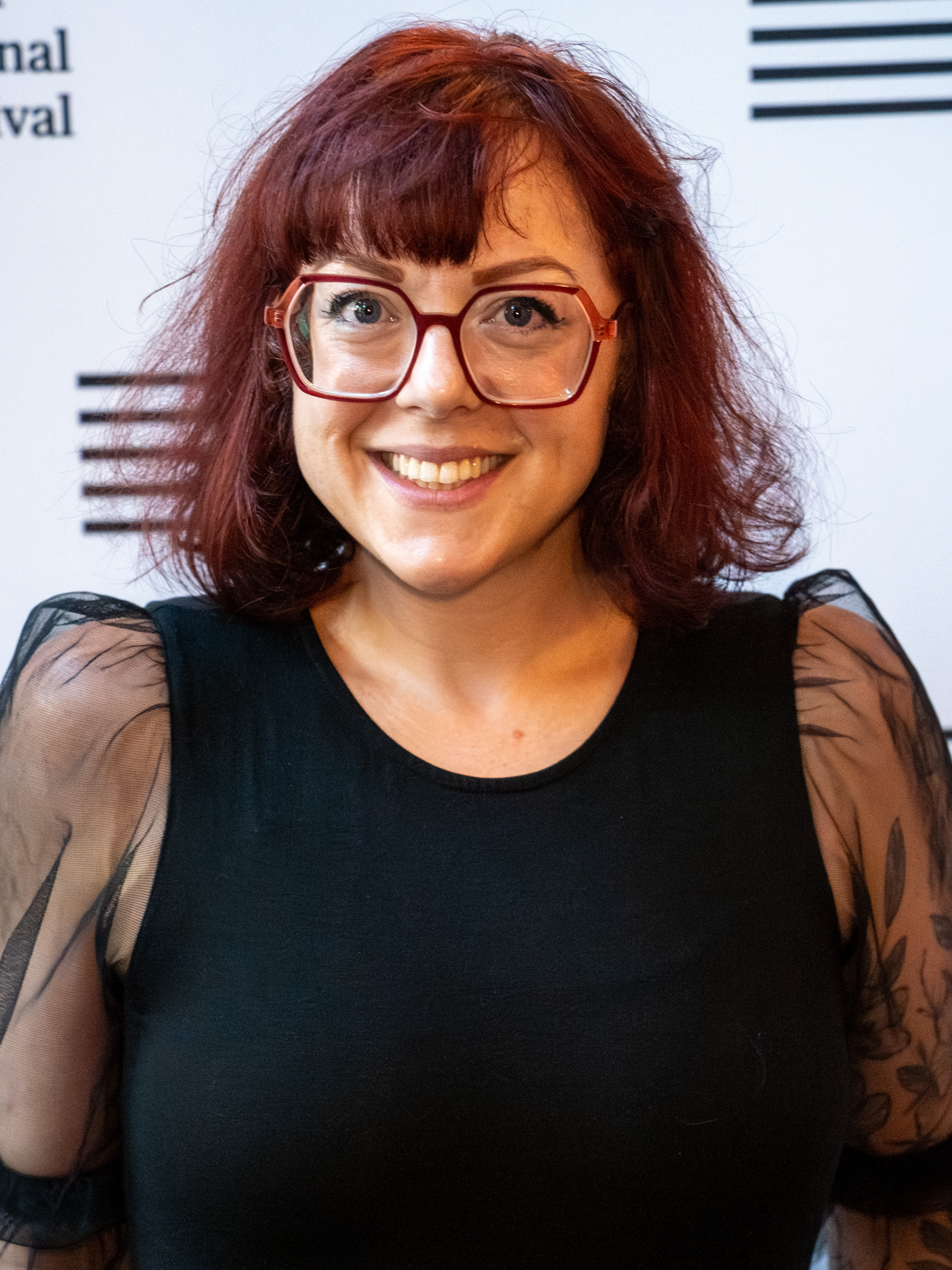
- V. E. Schwab in 2025
- Born: Victoria Elizabeth Schwab; July 7, 1987 (age 39); California, US
- Education: Washington University in St. Louis (BFA); University of Edinburgh (MSc)
- Occupation: Novelist
- Writing career
- Pen name: Victoria Schwab
- Period: 2010–present
- Genres: fantasy, science fiction, young adult, adult and middle grade fantasy
- Notable works: The Invisible Life of Addie LaRue; Shades of Magic series Villains series
- Website: www.veschwab.com

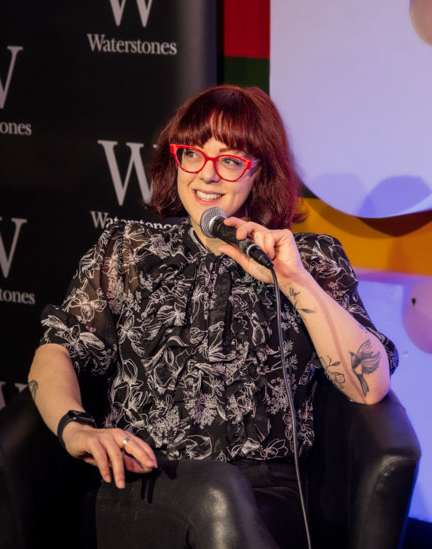
Victoria "V.E." Schwab on tour in 2022

Victoria Elizabeth Schwab (born July 7, 1987) is an American writer. She is known for the 2013 novel Vicious, the Shades of Magic series, and The Invisible Life of Addie LaRue, which was nominated for the 2020 Locus Award for Best Fantasy Novel. She publishes children's and young adult fiction books under the name Victoria Schwab. She is the creator of the supernatural teen drama series First Kill, based on her short story of the same name originally published in the 2020 anthology Vampires Never Get Old: Tales with Fresh Bite.

== Early life and education ==
Schwab was born in California. She was raised in both California and Nashville, Tennessee. Daughter of a British mother and American father, she has cited her bicultural upbringing as the source of her creative inspiration. Schwab attended Harpeth Hall School, an all-girls Southern preparatory school.

She graduated from Washington University in St. Louis with a Bachelor of Fine Arts in book design in 2009. Schwab had completed her first novel manuscript (unpublished) during her sophomore year. She sold her debut novel, The Near Witch, to Disney before graduating.

Schwab later received a Master of Science in Medieval Art History, with a specialty in depictions of monstrosity in medieval art, from the University of Edinburgh.

== Career ==
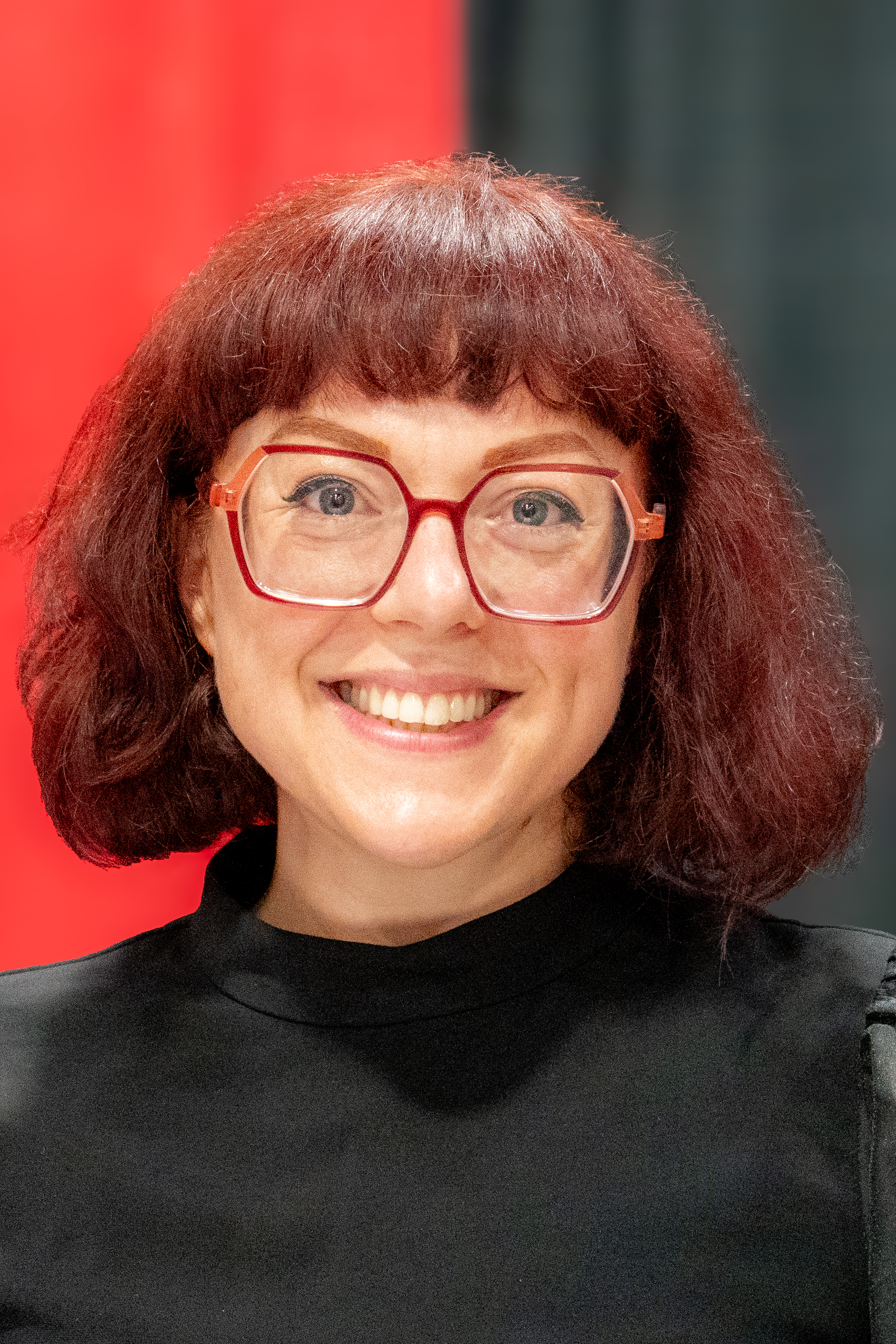
Schwab in 2025

Schwab's debut novel, The Near Witch, was published by Disney in 2011. It is a fairy tale romance following the main character, Lexi, in a small town where children start vanishing. It went out of print in less than two years, but was reissued in 2019 by Titan Books.

The Guardian called Vicious "a brilliant exploration of the superhero mythos, and a riveting revenge thriller". It received a starred review from Publishers Weekly. The American Library Association's Reference and User Services Association likewise awarded it the top fantasy book in their 2014 Reading List. In late 2013, the rights for a film adaptation of Vicious were bought jointly by Story Mining & Supply Co and Ridley Scott's Scott Free Productions.

In 2014, Schwab signed a two-book deal with Tor Books, which included A Darker Shade of Magic and its sequel. Following main character Kell and exploring inter-dimensional travel, A Darker Shade of Magic was published in February 2015. It was widely well-received and earned a starred review from Publishers Weekly. In 2017, she signed another book deal with Tor for Vengeful, the sequel to Vicious, as well as for a new trilogy set called Threads of Power, which takes place in the same world as the Shades of Magic series; and Black Tabs, a standalone novel described as an "homage to Blade Runner".

In May 2018, Schwab gave the sixth annual Tolkien Lecture at Pembroke College, Oxford. In her lecture, she reflected on her first introduction to the genre, describing how she first encountered fantasy at age 11 through the work of J.K. Rowling. She described this experience as her "door" into imaginative and immersive literature, marking the moment she first fell in love with the other-worldliness and creative possibility of fantasy. Schwab views fantasy as a powerful tool that allows both writers and readers to step beyond the boundaries of the ordinary world and to explore alternate realities, perspectives, and social structures. In her remarks, Schwab argues that fantasy writers "possess a special kind of magic" and the "ability to change the world." They have the capacity to influence how readers view the world through the craft of imaginative writing, which can become a form of emotional transformation. In her writing she aims to use fantasy to subvert traditional conventions as well as challenge readers' assumptions and beliefs, and she encourages other writers to do so as well. Schwab stated that one of her central goals is to create a narrative "door" into a new world for her readers, the same way that J.K. Rowling did for her.

In 2020, Schwab joined the panel of Podcast Writing Excuses to discuss book themes and other topics.

The Invisible Life of Addie LaRue was published by Tor Books on October 6, 2020. It was heavily praised and nominated for the 2020 Locus Award for Best Fantasy Novel. Exploring themes of memory and identity, the novel has sold over 2 million copies in the U.S.

Schwab has been the host of the podcast No Write Way with V. E. Schwab, in which she discusses the craft of writing with successful authors, since 2023. She offers deep dives into both her own process as well as those of her guests. Notable guests she has hosted include: Brandon Sanderson, Christina Lauren and Sarah Gailey.

In June 2025, Schwab published Bury Our Bones in the Midnight Soil, which topped the USA Today Bestseller List and The New York Times Bestseller List. The Chicago Review of Books stated that "In Schwab’s hands, even the well-trod territory of immortal bloodsuckers turns fresh and new."

== Films and television ==
Film and Television adaptations of Schwab's work have gained increasing attention in recent years, with various projects in several different stages of production.

=== Invisible Life of Addie LaRue (film) ===
A feature-film adaptation of The Invisible Life of Addie LaRue is currently in development, directed by Augustine Frizzell and produced by eOne. The film will be written by David Lowery, with Schwab as a producer on the project. Coverage from Elle confirms Schwab’s active involvement, highlighting her praise for the screenplay as "love letter to the book".

=== First Kill (television) ===
Schwab's short story "First Kill" was published in the 2020 anthology Vampires Never Get Old: Tales With Fresh Bite. On October 15, 2020, Netflix gave a series order to the production First Kill. Schwab served at the creator and an executive producer of the series and as a writer for a number of episodes. The first season of the series premiered on June 10, 2022, on Netflix. The show was cancelled in August 2022, despite having a "decent run" in terms of viewing figures. Gay Times, along with many LGBTQ fans, speculated that the cancellation was due to homophobic bias at the highest levels of TV decision making, as the show centered on a lesbian love story.

== Bibliography ==
=== As Victoria Schwab ===
==== The Dark Vault series ====
- The Archived (2013)
- The Unbound (2014)
- "Leave the Window Open" (2015; short story)
- The Returned (TBD)

==== Everyday Angel series ====
- New Beginnings (2014)
- Second Chances (2014)
- Last Wishes (2014)

==== Monsters of Verity series ====
- This Savage Song (2016)
- Our Dark Duet (2017)

==== Cassidy Blake series ====
- City of Ghosts (2018)
- Tunnel of Bones (2019)
- Bridge of Souls (2021)

==== Standalone works ====
- Spirit Animals: Fall of the Beasts - Broken Ground (2015; Book 2 of a series by various authors)
- Because You Love to Hate Me: 13 Tales of Villainy (2017; contributing writer)
- (Don't) Call Me Crazy (2018; contributing writer)

=== As V. E. Schwab ===
==== Villains Series ====
- "Warm Up" (2013; short story)
- Vicious (2013)
- Vengeful (2018)
- "Common Ground" (2018; short story)
- Victorious (2026)

==== Villains Graphic Novels ====
- ExtraOrdinary (2021)

==== Shades of Magic series ====
- A Darker Shade of Magic (2015)
- A Gathering of Shadows (2016)
- A Conjuring of Light (2017)

==== Threads of Power series ====
(spin off to Shades of Magic)

- The Fragile Threads of Power (2023)

==== Shades of Magic Graphic Novels series ====
- Shades of Magic Vol. 1: The Steel Prince (2019)
- Shades of Magic Vol. 2: Night of Knives (2019)
- Shades of Magic Vol. 3: The Rebel Army (2020)

==== The Near Witch series ====
- The Ash-Born Boy (2012; novella)
- The Near Witch (2011; republished in 2019 under V. E. Schwab)

==== Standalone works ====
- First Kill, a short story within the anthology Vampires Never Get Old: Tales With Fresh Bite (2020)
- The Invisible Life of Addie LaRue (2020)
- Gallant (2022)
- Bury Our Bones in the Midnight Soil (2025)
- The Ending Writes Itself (co-written with Cat Clarke under the pseudonym Evelyn Clarke) (2026)
- Black Tabs (announced)

=== As Evelyn Clarke, with Cat Clarke ===
- The Ending Writes Itself, (2025) ISBN 9780063444614

== Personal life ==
Schwab came out as gay at age 28, a milestone which she has described as both "personally and creatively formative."

== Awards ==
Work	Year	Award	Category	Result	Ref.
Vicious	2013	Goodreads Choice Awards	Fantasy	Nominated	
Vengeful	2018	Goodreads Choice Awards	Science fiction	Won	
A Darker Shade of Magic	2015	Goodreads Choice Awards	Fantasy	Nominated	
A Darker Shade of Magic	2020	Tähtifantasia Award		Nominated	
A Gathering of Shadows	2016	Goodreads Choice Awards	Fantasy	Nominated	
A Conjuring of Light	2017	Goodreads Choice Awards	Fantasy	Nominated	
Shades of Magic (series, book 1-3)	2019	Grand prix de l'Imaginaire	Foreign-Language Youth novel	Nominated	
Gallant	2022	Goodreads Choice Awards	Young Adults Fantasy & Science Fiction	Won	
Gallant	2022	Bram Stoker Award	Young Adult Novel	Nominated	
The Invisible Life of Addie LaRue	2020	Goodreads Choice Awards	Fantasy	Nominated	
The Invisible Life of Addie LaRue	2020	Book of the Month Award	Book of the Year	Nominated	
The Invisible Life of Addie LaRue	2021	Locus Award	Fantasy novel	Nominated	
The Fragile Threads of Power	2023	Goodreads Choice Awards	Fantasy	Nominated	
The Fragile Threads of Power	2023	Los Angeles Times Book Prize	Science Fiction, Fantasy & Speculative Fiction	Nominated	
Bury Our Bones in the Midnight Soil	2025	Goodreads Choice Awards	Fantasy	Won	
