= Italia Ricci =

Canadian-American actress (born 1986)

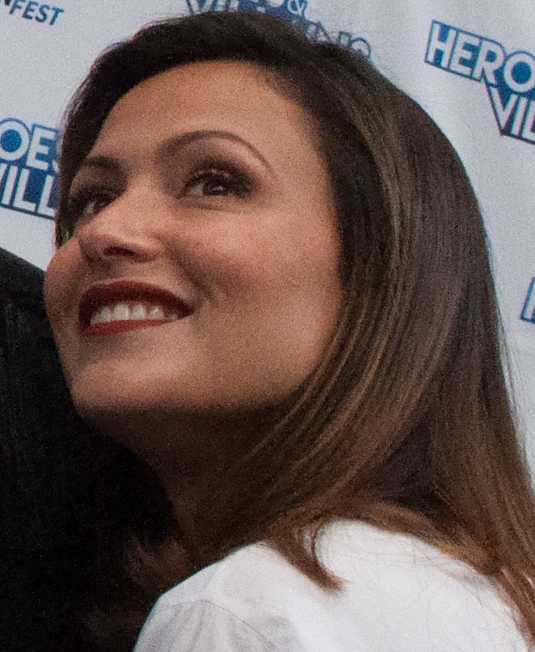
- Ricci at the 2017 Heroes & Villains FanFest
- Born: October 29, 1986 (age 39); Richmond Hill, Ontario, Canada
- Citizenship: Canada; United States
- Education: Queen's University (Kingston, Ontario) B.Arts Sci.
- Occupation: Actress
- Years active: 2007–present
- Spouse: Robbie Amell (m. 2016)
- Children: 1

Italia Ricci (Italian: [iˈtaːlja ˈrittʃi]; born October 29, 1986) is a Canadian-American actress. She is known for starring as April Carver in the 2014–2015 ABC Family television series Chasing Life, for playing Siobhan Smythe / Silver Banshee in Supergirl from 2015 to 2016 and for playing White House Chief of Staff and Special Advisor Emily Rhodes in the television drama series Designated Survivor from 2016 to 2019.

== Early life and education ==
Italia Ricci was born Stephanie-Italia Ricci in Richmond Hill, Ontario, and is of Italian descent. She graduated with her Bachelor of Arts and Science in 2008 from Queen's University (Kingston, Ontario), where she undertook charitable work for causes such as Water Can, a non-profit organization creating waterholes in Africa. Ricci was a Stand Up To Cancer ambassador and supporter of the Ovarian Cancer Research Fund.

== Career ==
Ricci made her major acting debut in 2007, in the American Pie direct-to-video film, Beta House. She then went on to have a recurring role on the Disney XD series Aaron Stone. In 2006, Ricci also appeared in the music video Hate (I Really Don't Like You) by Plain White T's as the ex-girlfriend.

During 2009, Ricci began appearing in American productions with minor roles in How I Met Your Mother, House, and Greek. During that same year, she had a recurring role in the Comedy Central series Secret Girlfriend as Sasha. In 2010, she co-starred in the Cartoon Network live-action series Unnatural History as Maggie Winnock. She also appeared in a Clean & Clear commercial as herself. In 2011, she appeared in the short film Valediction. In 2013, Ricci appeared in a small role in Joseph Gordon-Levitt's directorial debut film Don Jon.

From 2014 to 2015, she starred as April Carver in the ABC Family series Chasing Life. Ricci joined the cast of Supergirl in December 2015 as Siobhan Smythe / Silver Banshee. In September 2016, Ricci joined the ABC political drama Designated Survivor, as Emily Rhodes. The show was renewed by Netflix for a third season which was released on June 7, 2019 but was not renewed by Netflix for a fourth season.

She has also appeared in films for the Hallmark Channel, including Rome in Love and Love in Winterland.

In 2022, Ricci starred in The Imperfects as Dr. Sydney Burke. The ten-episode first season premiered on Netflix on September 8 in the United States.

In 2023, Ricci starred in the Hallmark Channel film Catch Me If You Claus.

== Personal life ==
Ricci began dating Canadian actor Robbie Amell in July 2008 after meeting whilst filming American Pie Presents: Beta House. They became engaged on August 19, 2014, and were married on October 15, 2016. Their first child, a son, was born in September 2019. Ricci and Amell both became citizens of the United States in January 2020.

== Filmography ==
=== Film ===
Year	Title	Role	Notes
2007	American Pie Presents: Beta House	Laura Johnson	Direct-to-video film
2008	The Death of Indie Rock	Diane	
2012	Valediction	Erica	Short film
2013	Don Jon	Gina	
2013	Dean Slater: Resident Advisor	Samantha Montaigne	
2014	The Remaining	Allison	
2026	The Confession	Naomi Riley	

=== Television ===
Year	Title	Role	Notes
2009	Aaron Stone	Chase Ravenwood	Recurring role (season 1); 5 episodes
2009	How I Met Your Mother	Hot Woman #1	Episode: "The Front Porch"
2009	House	Immigration Officer #2	Episode: "House Divided"
2009	Greek	Delia	Episode: "Social Studies"
2009	Secret Girlfriend	Sasha	Recurring role (season 1); 6 episodes
2010	True Jackson, VP	Herself	Episode: "Pajama Party"
2010	Unnatural History	Maggie Winnock	Main role
2012	CSI: Crime Scene Investigation	Vanessa Drake	Episode: "Pick and Roll"
2014–2015	Chasing Life	April Carver	Main role; 34 episodes Nominated – Golden Maple Award for Newcomer of the Year in a TV series broadcast in the U.S. (2015)
2015	Fatal Memories	Sutton Roberts	Television film (Lifetime)
2016	Supergirl	Siobhan Smythe / Silver Banshee	Recurring role (season 1); 5 episodes
2016	Late Bloomer	Jenny Taft	Television film (Hallmark)
2016–2019	Designated Survivor	Emily Rhodes	Main role; 53 episodes
2019	Rome in Love	Amelia Tate	Television film (Hallmark)
2020	Love in Winterland	Alice 'Ally' Wilson	Television film (Hallmark)
2021	The Good Doctor	Taryn Wilkie	Episode: "Waiting"
2021	Don't Go Breaking My Heart	Miranda Faraday	Television film (Hallmark)
2022	The Imperfects	Dr. Sydney Burke	Main role; 10 episodes
2023	Catch Me If You Claus	Avery Quinn	Television film (Hallmark)
2024	Trading Up Christmas	Michelle Kostka	Television film (Hallmark)
2025	Tracker	MC	Episode: "Eat the Rich"
