= The Invisible Life of Addie LaRue =

2020 fantasy novel by V. E. Schwab

- First edition cover
- Author: V. E. Schwab
- Cover artist: Will Staehle
- Language: English
- Genre: Fantasy novel
- Publisher: Tor Books
- Publication date: October 6, 2020
- Pages: 448
- ISBN: 978-0765387561
- Dewey Decimal: 813/.6 23

The Invisible Life of Addie LaRue is a fantasy novel by the American author V. E. Schwab. It was published by Tor Books on October 6, 2020. The story follows a young French woman who in 1714 makes a bargain with the Dark that makes her immortal, but curses her to be forgotten by everyone she meets. It was nominated for the 2021 Locus Award for Best Fantasy Novel.

== Plot ==
The story is balanced between a narrative in present day New York City and flashbacks starting from Addie's childhood in France to her experiences traveling the world and witnessing major historical events.

It begins in the early 1700s, following Addie as a young woman burdened by a forced marriage and praying to the gods for her freedom. On her wedding night, as she prays for the marriage to fail, she accidentally catches the attention of a god of the night, who she would later name Luc, who promises her the time she wants with the caveat being nobody will ever remember her after one encounter.

Over time she subtly influences many people, making marks in history and inspiring the creation of songs and art about her, some of which include a sculpture using a wooden bird, an abstract painting of the sky, and a song called "Dream Girl", by Toby Marsh.

Luc visits her every year after they make their deal, asking for her soul, but she refuses every time. The pair develop a relationship over time that carries on for about two decades. It ends abruptly when Luc asks again for her to surrender her soul, as Addie believes their relationship was just a gambit.

In 2014, Addie meets a man named Henry Strauss who can somehow remember her and speak her name. The pair become romantically involved until the day that Addie realizes that Henry only has 35 days left to live per conditions of his deal with Luc.

Due to heavy familial pressures placed on him, Henry had felt bogged down in his life, and a failed proposal made him attempt suicide. Luc visited him and granted his wish: whenever someone would see him, they would see what they desire the most. This allowed Henry to remember Addie, fulfilling her wish that somebody would remember her.

When the time came for Henry's death, Addie struck a new deal with Luc, who had developed genuine feelings for her: she would go with him if he allowed Henry to live. Luc accepts and, a few days later, takes her away, leaving Henry devastated.

Two years later, Addie spots a book while in a London bookstore. The name of the book is The Invisible Life of Addie LaRue, and there is no trace of the author anywhere. Despite this, Addie knows it is Henry when she reads the dedication, which simply states "I remember you." Luc states that he does not mind everyone knowing Addie's story so long as she is still in his possession.

The pair leave the bookstore, and Addie vows to herself that no matter how long it takes her, she will make Luc hate her again as he once did so he can cast her away and she can regain freedom once again.

== Characters ==
- Adeline "Addie" LaRue was born in Villon-sur-Sarthe, and flees her village in 1714 to escape an arranged marriage. She strikes a deal with Luc that grants her freedom and immortality, but no one will ever remember her, and once she gets tired of her life, she must surrender her soul to Luc. One day, when she visits a New York bookstore, she meets Henry Strauss, who remembers her.
- Luc is one of "the gods who answer after dark", who answers Addie's prayers. He is portrayed as a demonic entity or a trickster spirit who presents himself as a handsome man. Luc and Addie have an on and off romance that is broken off when Addie suspects that Luc's intentions are impure. After this, Luc goes out of his way to disrupt Addie's life in an effort to get her to surrender her soul.
- Henry Strauss is a worker at a bookstore in his mid-twenties who is the first person to remember her, aside from Luc. Luc had intercepted Henry's suicide attempt and struck a deal with him where he would be loved by all, would die after a year, with his soul belonging to Luc. In the book, people begin to see the version of Henry that they desire after he makes the deal. As Henry and Addie had both made deals with Luc, neither of them were impacted by the terms of the arrangements.

== Reception ==
The Invisible Life of Addie LaRue was on The New York Times Best Seller list for 37 consecutive weeks through July 2021.

Caitlyn Paxson at NPR praised the novel, particularly the attention to art: "her seven signature freckles ... she has attempted to imprint herself in an artist's mind ... fleeting impressions of a forgotten immortal. Together, they give us a sweeping feeling of urgency as we understand Addie's longing to be remembered in such a concrete and visceral way."

Kirkus Reviews labeled the novel a "spellbinding story" that would have readers "stay up all night reading—rich and satisfying and strange and impeccably crafted." Ellen Morton from The Washington Post called it a "tour de force," commending the momentum, contemplative story, and explorations of identity.

Megan Kallstrom of Slate noted the story's careful attention to detail, ending her review by saying: "Much like the seven freckles that sprinkle Addie's face, we create our own constellations, and as we live through these darkened days, I feel brighter for having added Addie to mine."

== Film adaptation ==
In November 2021, it was announced that eOne was planning to produce a film adaptation of the novel. Schwab is reported to have penned the early drafts of the screenplay before handing it off to husband-wife duo Augustine Frizzell and David Lowery; the former of the two also planned to direct the film. Alan Siegel, Danielle Robinson, Gerard Butler, as well as Schwab act as producers on the project.
