= Eve Cornwell =

British YouTuber and lawyer (born 1997)

- Born: June 10, 1997 (age 28)

YouTube information
- Channel: Eve Cornwell
- Years active: 2013–present
- Genres: StudyTube; LawTube
- Subscribers: 350 thousand
- Views: 26.6 million
- Last updated: 2 August 2025

Eve Cornwell (born 10 June 1997) is a British YouTuber and former lawyer. She has been described as both a StudyTuber and a LawTuber. She is married to Lucie Gabriela

== Career ==
Cornwell began her eponymous YouTube channel in 2013, where she originally documented her time studying law at the University of Bristol. In 2019, Cornwell launched the Millennial Coffee Club, which introduced its own blend of coffee in 2020.

After graduating, Cornwell shifted her content to focus on her career in law. She also moved away from YouTube, creating more short-form content on TikTok and Instagram Reels. This led The Times to describe her, among others, as a "lawfluencer." She began working at Linklaters as a trainee in 2019 but left her legal practice position in 2022 to work in legal tech at CreateiQ.

Cornwell is managed by Sixteenth.
