= A Darker Shade of Magic =

Novel by V. E. Schwab

- First US edition cover
- Author: V. E. Schwab
- Cover artist: Will Staehle
- Language: English
- Genre: Fantasy
- Publisher: Tor Books
- Publication date: February 24, 2015
- Publication place: United States
- Media type: Print (hardback & paperback)
- Pages: 400
- ISBN: 0-765-376458
- Followed by: A Gathering of Shadows

A Darker Shade of Magic is a fantasy novel by American author V. E. Schwab published by Tor Books in 2015. It is the first installment of the Shades of Magic trilogy.

== Plot ==
Kell is an Antari—a rare magician with powerful innate magic that sets him apart from others, who have to study hard to master magic. As an Antari, he has the rare ability to travel between parallel Londons, which he calls Red, Grey, White, and Black.

Kell was adopted at a young age by the King and Queen of Maresh Empire of Red London. He works as an ambassador, traveling between worlds to deliver messages between officials in magical and thriving Red London, the magicless Grey London, and White London, which has been ravaged by magic. The royal family treat Kell like a member of their family, and he is close with his brother, the crown prince Rhy, but he suspects that his adoptive parents may not care for him as much as they seem to.

Kell also has a secret life as a smuggler, servicing people willing to pay for even the smallest glimpses of magic.

When the Maresh king and queen receive an enchanted necklace from White London, they send Kell to deliver a message in return. When he returns home, he realizes their king and queen—twins Astrid and Athos—have slipped him a powerful black stone. The stone is a dangerous relic from Black London, which fell centuries ago when its people’s greed for magic exceeded their ability to control it, and all remnants of the lost world were supposedly destroyed.

Kell is pursued by Holland Vosijk—the only other known living Antari. He flees to Grey London, where a thief named Delilah (Lila) Bard steals the stone from him. Kell finds Lila, and the two fight Holland. Kell tries to convince Lila to give him the stone back, but she demands that he allow her to accompany him, and the two come up with a dangerous plan to return the stone to Black London.

Kell learns that Astrid has been controlling Rhy through the enchanted necklace, and she and Athos plan to break down the barriers between Red and White London and conquer it for their own. In a fight with Astrid, she stabs Rhy, and in order to save him, Kell binds his own life to Rhy's.

Kell and Lila return to White London, where they fight Astrid and Athos using the dark stone. The stone nearly overcomes Kell, but Lila helps him dispel the darkness, revealing some of her own magical affinity. Kell banishes Holland and the stone back to Black London, and returns to Red London with Lila. Lila, feeling free for the first time in her life, decides to stay in Red London and seek out magical training.

== Reception ==
The Guardian called A Darker Shade of Magic "a compelling, swashbuckling read reminiscent of Tim Powers’ more gung-ho fantasies". It received a starred review from Publishers Weekly and a Goodreads Choice Award.

== Film adaptation ==
On February 3, 2016, it was announced that Gerard Butler's production company G-BASE have acquired rights to adapt the book as a limited TV series.

However, a year later, on February 24, 2017, it was reported that a movie would be produced instead, and that Sony Pictures won the movie rights, beating Fox 2000, eOne, and Lionsgate. With the format change, Schwab has become one of the producers of the movie alongside Robinson, Alan Siegel, and Neal Moritz. Toby Ascher from Original Productions is the executive producer, and Executive Matthew Milam and Sanford Panitch, the president of Sony Pictures, are set to oversee production.

On October 3, 2019, the movie's screenwriter was announced: Derek Kolstad, the creator of the John Wick franchise.

== Sequels ==
The second installment of the Shades of Magic series, titled A Gathering of Shadows, was released on February 23, 2016. The third book in the series, A Conjuring of Light, was released February 21, 2017.
