= Gracie Dzienny =

American actress

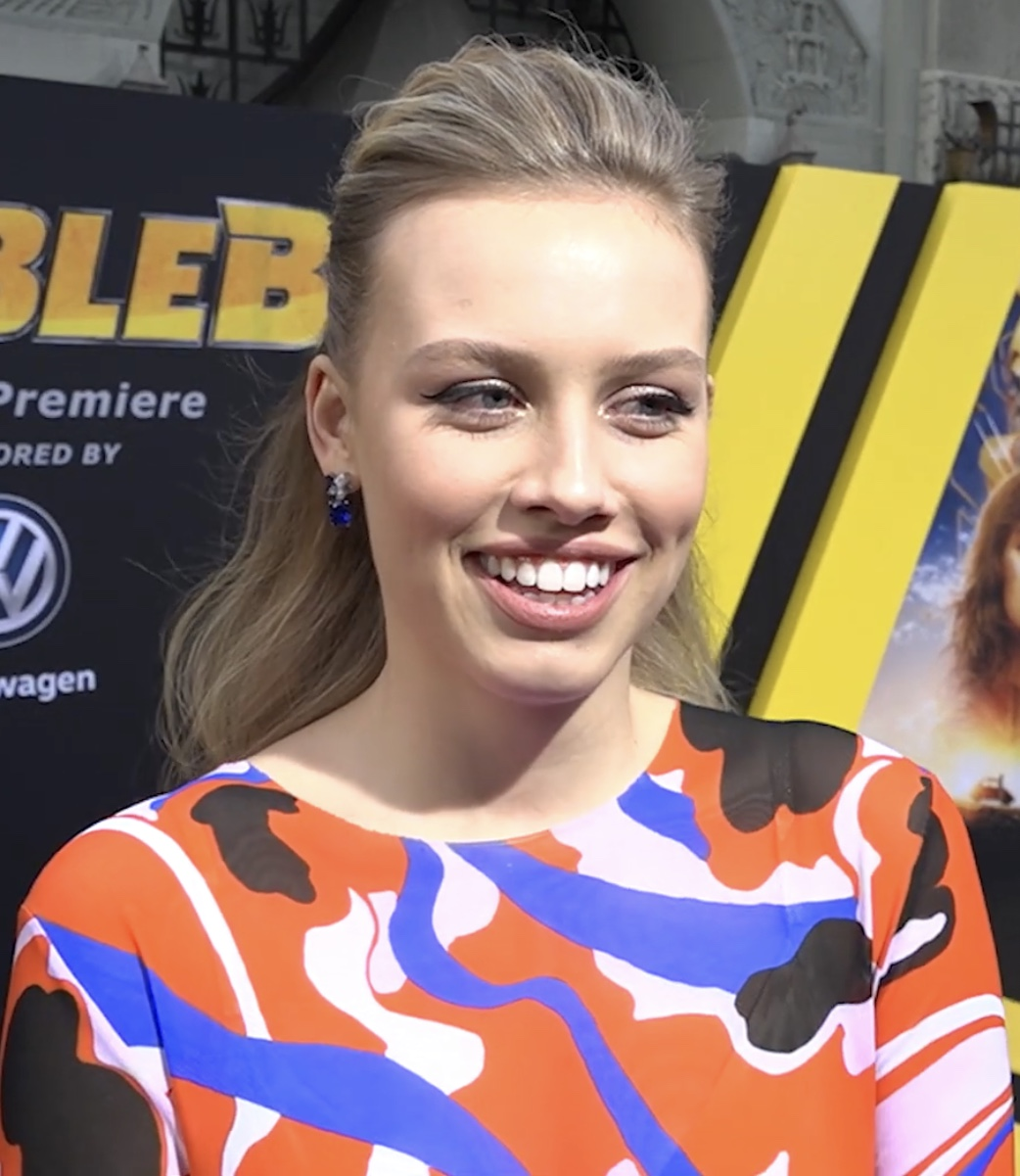
- Dzienny in 2018
- Born: August 26, 1995 (age 31); Toledo, Ohio, U.S.
- Occupation: Actress
- Years active: 2011–present

Gracie Dzienny (/ˌdˈzɛni/; born August 26, 1995) is an American actress. She is known for her roles as Amanda McKay on Nickelodeon's Supah Ninjas, as Greer Danville on ABC Family's Chasing Life, as Clementine Lewis on CBS' Zoo, and as Elinor Fairmont on Netflix's First Kill.

== Early life ==
Dzienny was born on August 26, 1995, in Toledo, Ohio, and is the daughter of Mike and Tara Dzienny. She is the youngest of three children. Dzienny began modeling at the age of five after winning a contest sponsored by L'Oréal, and primarily modeled during summers. Soon after taking up modeling she began studying tap, jazz, ballet, and hip hop dancing. After landing a role in the Supah Ninjas pilot, Dzienny and her mother moved to Los Angeles in November 2010.

Her Supah Ninjas co-star George Takei stated in an interview that Dzienny is a "musical theater fan".

== Career ==
During her freshman year in high school Dzienny auditioned for the part of Amanda on Supah Ninjas, a process that involved approximately half a dozen subsequent auditions.

In 2014, Dzienny began appearing in the ABC Family drama series Chasing Life playing Greer Danville, the love interest of the lead character's younger sister, Brenna (Haley Ramm). In December 2016, she was promoted to a starring role in the third season of the CBS drama series Zoo. In 2017, she joined the cast of the film Bumblebee. In 2021, Dzienny played the supporting role of Ruby Red in the Netflix superhero series Jupiter's Legacy. In May 2021, she was cast in the regular role of the vampire Elinor Fairmont in the Netflix vampire drama series First Kill.

== Filmography ==
Television and film roles
Year	Title	Role	Notes
2011–2013	Supah Ninjas	Amanda McKay	Main role
2012	Up All Night	Kylie	Episode: "Baby Fever"
2012	Fred: The Show	Holly	4 episodes
2013	See Dad Run	Chelsea	Episode: "See Dad Throw a Birthday Party"
2014	Side Effects	Rachel	Episode: "Kiss You"
2014–2015	Chasing Life	Greer Danville	Recurring role, 14 episodes
2015	State of Affairs	Stacey Dover	Episodes: "Ghosts", "Cry Havoc"
2016–2017	Zoo	Clementine	Guest role, episode: "Clementine"; main role (season 3)
2018	Bumblebee	Tina	Film
2019	Ramy	Melanie	Episodes: "A Black Spot on the Heart"
2021	Jupiter's Legacy	Ruby Red	4 episodes
2021	All American	Amber	Episode: "How Come"
2022	First Kill	Elinor Fairmont	Main role
2022	The Sex Lives of College Girls	Tatum	Recurring role (season 2), 5 episodes
2026	Ghosts	Barbara	Episode: "The Others"
