= Roma Roth =

Canadian executive producer

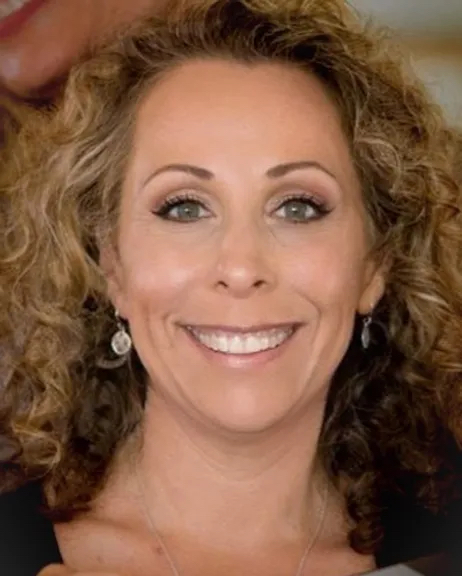
- Born: London, Ontario
- Known for: television, producing
- Movement: television, producing

Roma Roth is an executive producer and showrunner, best known for executive producing the Netflix television series Virgin River, and executive producing and showrunning the CTV and CW television series Sullivan's Crossing. Roth is the President of Reel World Management (RWM), a production and distribution company that develops and finances feature and television productions. Roth runs RWM with her husband and fellow executive producer, Christopher E. Perry.

== Early life ==
Roth is the daughter of the late René Roth, a biology professor, and Hanna Roth, who was the head lab photography tech on the 1960s film, Exodus. She has a twin sister, Rosana, who is a film director based in Montreal. Roth studied anthropology at Western University and the University of Calgary, where she earned a master's degree in primatology. In 1994, she began her career in television on the set of The Return To Lonesome Dove series.

== Career ==
=== Television series ===
Virgin River, 2019–present

In 2019, Roth became an executive producer on the Netflix television series, Virgin River, based on the bestselling Harlequin book series by romance author Robyn Carr. Roth was attracted to the books because of their narrative emphasis on romance, family and hope. The series features actors Alexandra Breckenridge, who plays a nurse named Melinda Monroe who travels to Virgin River to escape her troubled past, and Martin Henderson, who plays former marine and bar owner Jack Sheridan.

Sullivan's Crossing, 2023–present

Roth is an executive producer and showrunner on the series, Sullivan's Crossing, based on The New York Times' bestselling series from author Robyn Carr. Originally a Canadian show, Sullivan's Crossing was developed by RWM, the CTV television network, Bell Media and Fremantle. The series follows neurosurgeon Maggie Sullivan, played by Morgan Kohan, as she reconnects with her small-town past. When Roth was casting the show, she started looking for actors who had a television footprint from the 1980s and 1990s, to amplify the connection audiences made with the characters they played. Roth cast Scott Patterson from Gilmore Girls, as Sullivan's estranged father, Sully, and Chad Michael Murray from One Tree Hill as Cal Jones, Sullivan's love interest. Patterson credits Roth for creating this career defining opportunity for him. Roth decided to shoot the series in Nova Scotia, Canada.

=== Made for television movies ===
In 2012, Roth executive produced Taken Back: Finding Haley, starring Moira Kelly and Amanda Tapping, and the next year she wrote and was the executive producer for Dangerous Intuitions, starring Tricia Helfer and Estella Warren. That same year, Roth wrote the screenplay for The Toyman Killer, starring Magda Apanowicz and Sarah Carter. In 2015, Roth was a producer on The Music in Me, a television romance featuring Debbie Gibson and Gloria Reuben. The following year, Roth made her directorial debut in The Stepchild, a made-for-television movie starring Lauren Holly and Paul Johansson. In addition to directing the film, Roth was also an executive producer and co-writer. In 2017, Roth was an executive producer for The Wrong Bed: Naked Pursuit, a Lifetime original movie starring Stella Williams and Owen Michaels.

=== Forthcoming ===
Roth is attached to executive produce the adaptation of author David Morrell's novel, Testament. In 2020, singer Shania Twain teamed up with Reel World Management, with Roth as an executive producer, to develop a drama based on Debbie Macomber's series of novels, Heart of Texas.
