= Morgan Kohan =

Canadian actress (born 1993)

- Born: December 30, 1993 (age 32); Summerland, British Columbia, Canada
- Occupation: Actress
- Years active: 2014–present

Morgan Kohan (born December 30, 1993) is a Canadian actress. In 2019, Kohan began starring as Lillian in When Hope Calls, a spinoff of When Calls the Heart in which Kohan guest starred in an episode that served as a backdoor pilot for When Hope Calls. In June 2022, it was announced she would star in the lead role of the drama series Sullivan's Crossing.

== Early life ==
Born in Summerland, British Columbia, Kohan was accepted to Randolph College for the Performing Arts in Toronto for their Triple Threat program for acting, singing and dancing. She was initially intending on entering a dancing career before shifting focus toward acting.

== Career ==
In 2014, Kohan began her acting career at the age of 21; she appeared in guest spot roles in series such as Murdoch Mysteries, Kim's Convenience, Star Trek: Discovery and Batwoman. She took on a recurring role in the crime suspense drama series Ransom, where she played the role as Evie Beaumont. In 2018, Kohan appeared in the Lifetime film The Black Widow Killer, directed by Adrian Langley, portraying Abbey Dwyer. In 2019, Kohan starred in the horror fantasy drama movie Demons Inside Me, directed by Alexandre Carrière, who also played the role of Jade Williams.

Kohan was cast to play the lead character in the drama series When Hope Calls, which was a spin-off of Hallmark Channel's When Calls the Heart, which is based on the Canadian West book series by Janette Oke. She played the lead role of Lillian Walsh, the older sister of Grace Bennett, who was adopted at a young age and separated from Grace. In 2020, Kohan co-starred with Marcus Rosner in the Hallmark movie Love on Harbor Island, directed by Lucie Guest. In the same year, Kohan co-starred opposite Paul Sun-Hyung Lee, Janet Porter, Kathryn Kohut and Vienna Hehir in the comedy movie by Dennis Alexander Nicholson titled Kitty Mammas.

In 2021, Kohan worked with real-life partner Drew Nelson in the television movies: A Romance Wedding and A Whirlwind Wedding.

In 2023, Kohan was cast alongside Chad Michael Murray, Tom Jackson, Andrea Menard and Scott Patterson in CTV's Sullivan's Crossing, where she plays the lead role as Maggie Sullivan.

== Filmography ==
=== Television ===
Year	Title	Role	Notes
2017	Murdoch Mysteries	Sarah Glass	1 episode
2017	Kim's Convenience	Jen	1 episode
2018	Star Trek: Discovery	Weapons Trader	1 episode
2018	In Contempt	Random White Woman	1 episode
2018	Ransom	Evie Beaumont	3 episodes
2018	When Calls the Heart	Lillian Walsh	1 episode
2019	The Bold Type	Risa	1 episode
2019	Creeped Out	Faye	1 episode
2019-present	When Hope Calls	Lillian Walsh	Main role, 14 episodes
2021	Batwoman	Stephanie Brown	1 episode
2022	Transplant	Kelsey Grisholm	1 episode
2023–present	Sullivan's Crossing	Dr. Maggie Sullivan	Main role, 34 episodes
