= Jenny Cooper =

Canadian actress

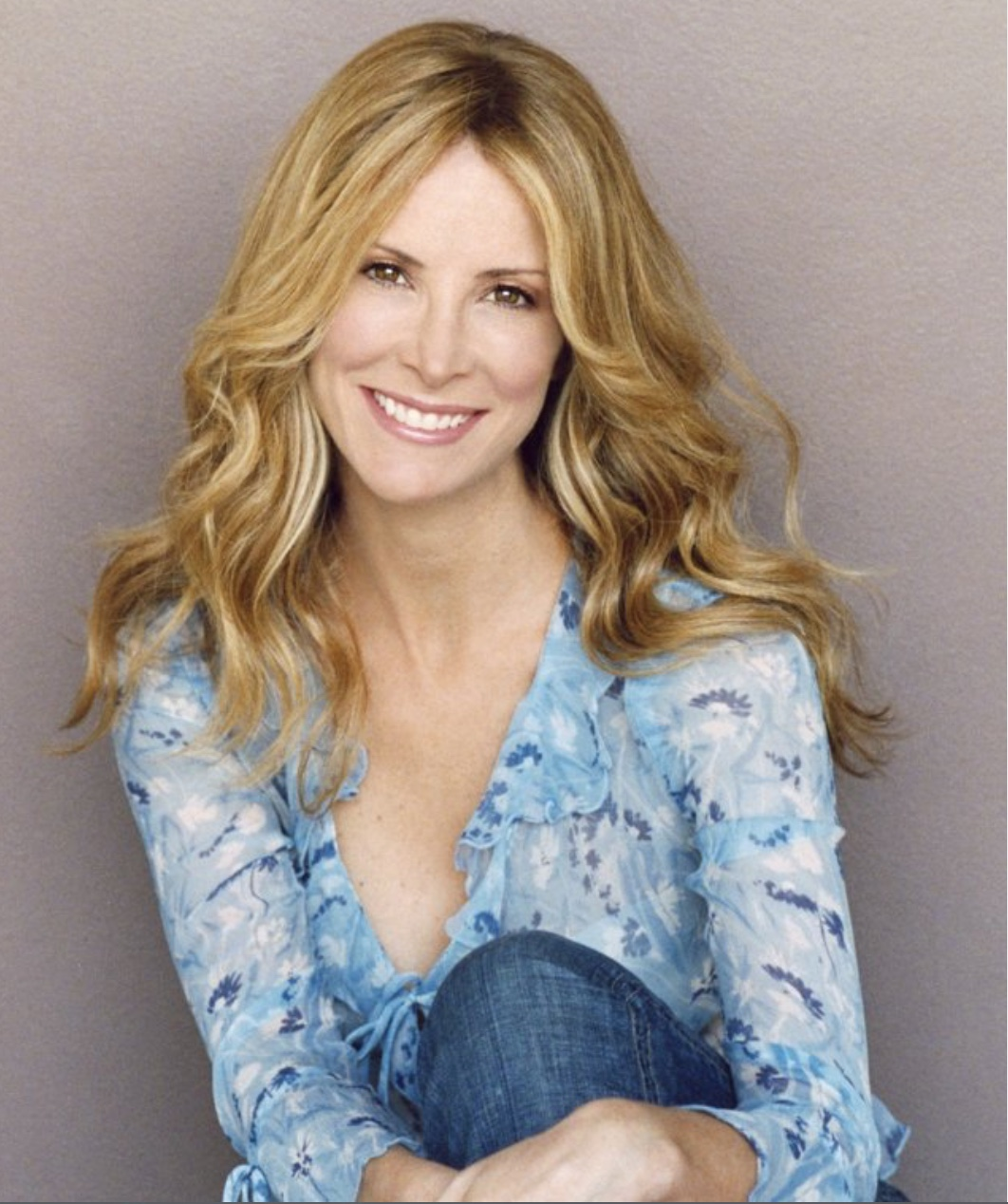
- Born: Jenny Levine; 1975 (age 50–51); Toronto, Ontario, Canada
- Occupation: Actress
- Years active: 1995–present
- Spouse: Daniel Cooper
- Children: 3

Jenny Cooper (born 1975, formerly credited as Jenny Levine) is a Canadian actress. She made her professional debut in 1995 as series star Molly in the Canadian TV series Jake and the Kid as the series regular Molly, went on to star in the Showtime series Fast Track, and has subsequently been a guest star in numerous shows including Monk, Scandal, The Outer Limits and CSI Miami. Cooper also starred in the miniseries The Feast of All Saints. She also played trauma surgeon Jane Blake in the 2015 TV mystery drama Open Heart.

== Acting career ==
Cooper began acting in school plays at age 11. She started her professional career in the TV series Jake and the Kid in 1995 and has starred in dozens of TV series.

She had a recurring role as Valerie Harris on four episodes of the Fox TV series 24, portraying a Homeland Security official who was part of a takeover of the Counter Terrorism Unit.The project reunited her with Jon Cassar, the show's executive producer who had directed her on Jake and the Kid. Because each season of the show takes place on one day, she never had a wardrobe change, but she had multiples of the same outfit.

In 2013, Cooper was the screenwriter, co-producer and one of the lead actors on the Canadian film I Think I Do. The romantic comedy was set in Edmonton and also filmed on location in the city. Cooper portrayed the sister of characters portrayed by Mia Kirshner and Sara Canning, who together run a wedding planning company. Cooper also played a guest role in various TV shows such as Doc, The Outer Limits, Nash Bridges, and Monk.

Since 2019, she has had a main and recurring role in Virgin River (TV series).

== Personal life ==
Cooper was born in 1975 in Toronto, grew up in Key Biscayne, Florida and lives in Los Angeles. She married Daniel Cooper in 2008 and has 3 children.

== Filmography ==
=== Film ===
Year	Title	Role	Notes
2004	Godsend	Sandra Shaw	
2008	Baby Blues	Josie Patterson	
2010	Unconditionally	Alise	Short
2013	I Think I Do	Beth	Also writer and producer
2016	Shovel Buddies	Susan	Video
2016	Bambina	Anne	Short, completed

=== Television ===
Year	Title	Role	Notes
1995–96	Jake and the Kid	Molly Gattenby	Recurring role
1997	When Innocence Is Lost	Darlene	TV film
1997	Psi Factor: Chronicles of the Paranormal	Pvt. Kristin Smythe	"Man of War"
1997–98	Fast Track	Wendy Servine	Main role
1999	Nash Bridges	Julia Clark	"Hide and Seek"
1999	The Outer Limits	Laura White	"Descent"
2000	Foreign Objects	Allison	TV series
2001	Feast of All Saints	Aglae Dazincourt	TV miniseries
2002	Bliss	Laura	"Guys and Dolls"
2002	Monk	Jennifer Zepetelli	"Mr. Monk and the Psychic"
2003	The One	Emily Gardner	TV film
2003	Mutant X	Lisa Larkin	"Inferno"
2003	Soul Food	Wenda Carlton	"Truth's Consequences"
2003	Missing	Ingrid Brodie	"Ties That Bind"
2003–04	Doc	Marcia Rodich	"The Way We Were", "Lights Camera Medicine"
2004	True Crimes: The First 72 Hours	Kathleen Philcox	"Lone Wolf"
2004–06	Strange Days at Blake Holsey High	Sarah Pearson	Recurring role
2006	24	Valerie Harris	Recurring role
2006	The Obsession	Linda Irving	TV film
2007	Close to Home	Rita Lewis	"Fall from Grace"
2007	Ghost Whisperer	Jane Hargrove	"The Gathering"
2007	Las Vegas	Helen	"A Cannon Carol"
2011	CSI: Miami	Suzanne Gramercy	"Crowned"
2012	Scandal	Kendal Parks	"The Trail"
2012	Last Resort	Carol Terman	"Blue on Blue"
2012	NCIS	Connie Martin	"Gone"
2015	Open Heart	Dr. Jane Blake	Main role
2015	Bones	Kim Delson	"The Lost in the Found"
2015	Grey's Anatomy	Bethany Tanner	"Sledgehammer"
2015	CSI: Cyber	Karen Sullivan	"Red Crone"
2016	Rizzoli & Isles	Elizabeth	"Post Mortem"
2019–2024	Virgin River	Joey Barnes	Main role (season 1); Recurring (season 2-season 5) 28 episodes
