= Mark Ghanimé =

Lebanese-Canadian actor and producer (born 1977)

- Born: December 1, 1977 (age 48); Calgary, Alberta, Canada
- Citizenship: Canadian; Lebanese
- Occupation: Actor
- Years active: 2004–present

Mark Ghanimé (born December 1, 1977) is a Canadian actor, with Lebanese origins. He is known for his roles as Major Sergio Balleseros on the Syfy original series Helix, and for recurring as Don Carlos on The CW series Reign.

== Early life ==
Ghanimé was born on December 1, 1977, in Calgary, Alberta, Canada to a Canadian mother and a Lebanese father. He spent time growing up in both Calgary and in Montreal, Quebec, Canada and was trilingual from an early age, speaking French, English, and Arabic due to his diverse heritage.

Ghanimé grew up focusing on academics with the intent of becoming a business man and going into real estate. He obtained a finance degree from the University of Lethbridge in Canada. In his early twenties, Ghanimé began taking vocal lessons and hip-hop dance classes in order to explore his creative side. In 2004, Ghanimé had an uncredited, background role in Chasing Freedom starring Juliette Lewis. While on set, he became passionate about acting and knew he wanted to pursue it as a career.

== Career ==
After starting his career acting in commercials, Ghanimé was cast in his first guest-starring role as Graham in the CBC Television series Wild Roses. He then had small guest starring roles on Smallville and Supernatural in 2010 and The Secret Circle, Fairly Legal, and Arrow in 2012. Starting in 2012, Ghanimé had a recurring role as Dr. Jamie Albagetti on The CW series Emily Owens, M.D. and a starring role as Daniel Goose-Egg in the web series Soldiers of the Apocalypse, for which he also served as associate producer. In 2013, he had supporting roles as Run in the Showcase miniseries Eve of Destruction and as the museum curator in the Hallmark Channel television movie The Hunters.

Ghanimé's most significant role came in 2014 when he was cast as a series regular in the Syfy original series Helix, playing Major Sergio Balleseros who guides a team of CDC scientists to investigate a disease outbreak at a research facility in the arctic. The series was cancelled on April 29, 2015, and aired for two seasons.

In 2015, Ghanimé was cast in the recurring role of Don Carlos in the third season of The CW series Reign. He also recurred as Justin Faysal on the Chiller horror anthology series Slasher in 2016.

in 2017, Ghanimé recurred on the second season of Private Eyes, playing a romantic interest of the main character, Angie Everett, played by Cindy Sampson.

In 2023, Ghanimé plays Sam Calloway in To All a Good Night with Kimberley Sustad.

Ghanimé most recently appeared as Dr. Cameron Hayek on Netflix's Virgin River.

== Personal life ==
He has visited Lebanon numerous times and wishes to portray more Middle-Eastern characters in order to bring positive light to the Middle East and accentuate the beauty of countries such as Lebanon which he says are rarely portrayed positively in the media.

== Filmography ==
=== Film ===
Year	Title	Role	Notes
2006	Take Out	Lebanese Gangster	
2011	Citizen 101	Richard	
2013	One Night in Seattle	Mark Henley	
2013	Cinemanovels	The Man in the Clock Tower	
2015	The Age of Adaline	New Year's Eve Stranger	

=== Television ===
Year	Title	Role	Notes
2004	Chasing Freedom	Villager (Uncredited)	Television film
2009	Wild Roses	Graham	Episode: "Time and Chance"
2010	Smallville	Teddybear Guy	Episode: "Persuasion"; uncredited
2010	Supernatural	Dr. Drake	Episode: "The Devil You Know"
2012	The Secret Circle	Java Brew Man	Episode: "Traitor"
2012	Fairly Legal	CSI Detective	Episode: "Borderline"
2012	Abducted: The Carlina White Story	Photographer	Television film
2012	Arrow	Dr. Douglas Miller	Episode" "Year's End"
2012–2013	Soldiers of the Apocalypse	Daniel Goose-Egg	Main role; also Associate Producer
2012–2013	Emily Owens, M.D.	Dr. Jamie Albagetti	Recurring role, 6 episodes
2013	Eve of Destruction	Run	Miniseries
2013	The True Heroines	Police Officer	Episode: "Pilot Part 2"; uncredited
2013	The Hunters	Museum Curator	Television film
2014–2015	Helix	Major Sergio Balleseros	Main role
2015	Killer Photo	Kurt Miller	Television film; also known as Watch Your Back
2015	Quantico	Danny	Episode: "Quantico"
2015–2017	Reign	Don Carlos	Recurring role, 5 episodes
2016	Slasher	Justin Faysal	3 episodes
2017	iZombie	Devon	Episode: "Eat, Pray, Liv"
2017	Wynonna Earp	Jonas	Episode: "Everybody Knows"
2017–2018	Private Eyes	Dr. Ken Graham	Recurring role, 5 episodes
2018	The Detectives	Detective Mike Cavilla	Episode: "Home"
2018	No Escape Room	Michael	Television film
2018	Christmas with a View	Hugh Peters	Television film
2019	Always and Forever Christmas	Scott Jensen	Television film
2019	Twinkle All the Way	Danny	Television film
2019–2020	The Bold Type	Dev	3 episodes
2020	Candy Cane Christmas	Eric Kelton	Television film
2020–present	The Wedding Planners	Dan Karam	Recurring role
2022–present	Virgin River	Dr. Cameron Hayek	Main role (season 4, 5)
2023	To All a Good Night	Sam Calloway	Lead role, Television film
2024	A Dance in the Snow	Daniel	Hallmark Movie
