= Helix (TV series) =

2014 American science fiction horror series

- Genre: Science fiction; Horror; Drama
- Created by: Cameron Porsandeh
- Starring: Billy Campbell; Hiroyuki Sanada; Kyra Zagorsky; Mark Ghanimé; Matt Long
- Composer: Reinhold Heil
- Country of origin: United States
- Original language: English
- No. of seasons: 2
- No. of episodes: 26

Production
- Executive producers: Ronald D. Moore; Lynda Obst; Steven Maeda; Brad Turner
- Running time: 38–44 minutes
- Production companies: Sony Pictures Television; Muse Entertainment Enterprises; Lynda Obst Productions; Tall Ship Productions; Kaji Productions

Original release
- Network: Syfy
- Release: January 10, 2014 – April 10, 2015

Helix is an American science fiction horror drama television series that aired on Syfy from January 10, 2014, to April 10, 2015. The series follows a team of scientists from the Centers for Disease Control and Prevention (CDC) who travel to a research facility in the Arctic to investigate a potential outbreak of disease. While there, they find themselves stuck in a life-or-death situation that could decide the future of mankind. The executive producers of Helix were Ronald D. Moore, Lynda Obst, Steven Maeda, and Cameron Porsandeh, with Maeda serving as day-to-day showrunner. On April 29, 2015, Syfy announced that the show was canceled after two seasons.

== Plot ==
=== Season 1 ===
Researchers from the CDC, led by Dr. Alan Farragut and Dr. Sarah Jordan investigate a viral outbreak at an Arctic bioresearch station, only to discover that it has disastrous and wider implications for the entire world. Proscribed genetic engineering research is being done by the Ilaria Corporation, the company running the research station, most interested in preventing exposure of their activities, rather than simply resolving the outbreak. Attempts at quarantine result in mutiny and attempted escape, and communication with the outside is mysteriously cut off. It is unclear at first whether the goal is to develop a bioweapon or to transform humans in some way. It is discovered that there are two variants of the virus: the first, Narvik-A, is fatal with no cure; those infected with the second virus, Narvik-B, become dangerous, violent, zombie-like vectors, spreading the infection to others, with a small percentage eventually regaining some normality if treated, as it seems several characters have already been infected and cured. Those cured seem to have the ability to control the infected. The outbreak is revealed to have been a cover story to recruit Julia Walker as an unwitting test subject by deceiving the CDC personnel into creating an antiviral "cure", to benefit the Ilaria Corporation's objectives.

After becoming infected, Julia is cured by the station director, Hiroshi Hatake, who reveals he is her father, quasi-immortal and over 500 years old, as indicated by his bright silver eyes. He had created the Vector virus as a means to activate dormant genes within Julia to give her a similar variation of immortality. Ilaria, which is run by a similar group of immortals, wants the virus in order to exert control over the world. Ilaria's Chief Operating Officer, Constance Sutton, arrives with a mercenary army, and despite a protracted resistance effort by the CDC and base personnel, butchers most of the staff before abducting Julia. A cliffhanger, set almost eight months after the pilot episode (on Day 235), shows Alan meeting with his brother Peter somewhere in France, following a massive outbreak of the virus, to plan a border crossing. Alan is apparently oblivious to the fact that his brother is actively working with Ilaria and that Julia is an active member of Ilaria's immortal Board of Directors.

=== Season 2 ===
Set once more in a remote, isolated place, this time the island of St. Germain, inhabited by members of a religious community going back several generations, the second season takes place approximately fifteen months after the events of the first season, with regular sequences showing events taking place an additional thirty years later on the same island. Alan, who has been interrogating and then killing immortals in his search to rescue Julia, has been discredited by the CDC. Peter leads the three-member team investigating a new outbreak on the island. In the future, Julia is on a quest of her own.

== Cast ==
=== Principal ===
- Billy Campbell as Dr. Alan Farragut
- Hiroyuki Sanada as Dr. Hiroshi Hatake (main season 1; recurring season 2)
- Kyra Zagorsky as Dr. Julia Walker
- Mark Ghanimé as Major Sergio Balleseros
- Matt Long as Dr. Kyle Sommer (season 2)

=== Recurring ===
Seasons 1–2

- Jordan Hayes as Dr. Sarah Jordan
- Neil Napier as Dr. Peter Farragut
- Meegwun Fairbrother as Daniel Aerov/Miksa and Tulok
- Luciana Carro as Anana (credit only in season 2)
- Amber Goldfarb as Jaye and as Jane Walker
- Catherine Lemieux as Dr. Doreen Boyle

Season 1

- Jeri Ryan as Constance Sutton
- Robert Naylor as Spencer Sutton / The Scythe
- Julian Casey as Dr. Victor Adrian
- Patrick Baby as Dr. Philippe Duchamp
- Chimwemwe Miller as Dr. Joel Haven
- Miranda Handford as Dr. Rae Van Eigem
- Leni Parker as Dr. Tracey
- Vitali Makarov as Dr. Dmitri Marin
- Alain Goulem as Dr. Bryce
- Tamara Brown as Dr. Sulemani
- Eric Davis as Dr. Graf
- Alexandra Ordolis as Blake
- Helen Koya as Thea / Willa
- Christian Jadah as Lt. Klein
- Anders Yates as Gunnar

Season 2

- Steven Weber as Brother Michael
- Alison Louder as Sister Amy
- Severn Thompson as Sister Anne
- Clare Coulter as Sister Agnes
- Sean Tucker as Landry
- Jim Thorburn as Caleb
- Sarah Booth as Olivia
- Cameron Brodeur as Soren
- Kayla DiVenere as Lizzie
- Patricia Summersett as Lt. Commander Winger
- Julian Bailey as Lt. Humphries
- Matthew Kabwe as Maxwell
- Cristina Rosato as Leila Weisner

== Development ==
The series pitch idea was developed by Cameron Porsandeh, who then submitted it to Sony Pictures, where Lynda Obst revised the idea along with Porsandeh. Sony then asked if there was a major science fiction television writer he would like attached as executive producer, and he suggested Ronald D. Moore, who joined the production team and pitched several new major concepts. The pilot script was written by Porsandeh, and while Moore pitched several key ideas he did not write the script itself.

As Porsandeh explained:

So I took a stab at it and we sent it over to Sony [Pictures Television] and Lynda Obst, she takes a real interest in science, she did Contact and really sort of prides herself on the subject, and she saw something in it. So I developed it over at Sony for probably about six months. Then they said "if you could work with anyone on this project, who would you want to do it with?" And I said, "Ron Moore" sort of like it's a fantasy, sort of like "who would you want to date if you could date anyone," and I threw his name out the way you would throw a movie star's name out. They sent it over to him and he was interested so he got on board. Then together we came up with an overarching mythology that would extend over the course of the entire series, then he and I together pitched it to Syfy.

Porsandeh stated that a major feature of the series is that each episode represents the events of a single day within the story: thus the entire thirteen episode first season takes place in under two weeks of in-universe time.

According to Porsandeh, Helix did not make use of flashback scenes to give details about character backstories, the way the science fiction series Lost did. Instead, a key point is that viral infection at times made characters feverish and hallucinate (which is a real-life symptom of several infections). Thus certain characters experienced hallucinations, i.e. reliving particularly traumatic past events. The distinction Porsandeh pointed out is that a flashback is presented as objectively true, while the hallucination scenes in Helix are presented from the characters' feverish hallucinatory states, and thus their unreliable narration will contain several errors which do not match events as they actually occurred.

== Episodes ==
=== Season 1 (2014) ===
No. overall	No. in season	Title	Directed by	Written by	Original release date	US viewers (millions)
1	1	"Pilot"	Jeffrey Reiner	Cameron Porsandeh	January 10, 2014	1.82
Drs. Julia Walker, Alan Farragut and his team of CDC scientists, along with an Army Liaison, Major Sergio Balleseros, are called to an ArcTec BioSystems Research Facility above the 83rd parallel, far north of any national jurisdiction, run by the Ilaria Corporation & headed by Dr. Hiroshi Hatake. Dr. Farragut's scientist brother, Peter, was infected there by a deadly and unknown virus. Soon after arriving, Dr. Farragut and his team realize that the knowledge they have been made privy to is only the tip of the proverbial iceberg, and that hidden secrets far outweigh disclosed facts.
2	2	"Vector"	Brad Turner	Keith Huff	January 10, 2014	1.82
The CDC team tries to find a treatment for the infected patients and contain the virus by determining who might have been exposed to it. In the process, group panic begins to set in amongst the scientists & support personnel within the station.
3	3	"274"	Steven A. Adelson	Misha Green	January 17, 2014 (Note: "274" was originally made available on iTunes and Hulu starting on January 11.)	1.34
On day 3, Peter seeks Alan's help before he collapses; young Dr. Sarah Jordan creates a "rapid response" test for infected patients, & Alan's ex-wife Dr. Julia Walker, attacked by Peter in the shower, begins to slowly feel the effects of the pathogen. While this goes on, Major Balleseros helps Dr. Doreen Boyle get another sample of Macaque-blood to replace that which was taken from her.
4	4	"Single Strand"	Duane Clark	Story by : Cameron Porsandeh; Teleplay by : Javier Grillo-Marxuach	January 24, 2014	1.39
On day 4, the people who had tested positive for the virus, and been quarantined/abandoned in the base's lower level, force Dr. Hatake to re-establish communication after they cut off the air supply to the base's upper levels. Meanwhile, Peter's condition worsens quickly, forcing Alan to try a virtually untested universal virus treatment; Sarah comes to question her "rapid response" test's veracity; & Dr. Doreen Boyle gets closer to figuring out more about the virus and Major Balleseros.
5	5	"The White Room"	Duane Clark	Misha Green	January 31, 2014	1.13
On day 5, after Doreen's body shows up dead, and CCTV from the time shows up corrupted, Alan tries to find out what really happened to her. Julia, on quarantine level "R," finds a helpful friend, while Sarah hides more than just an infected patient in her room. At the same time, Balleseros tries to uncover the whereabouts of the missing Dr. Hvit.
6	6	"Aniqatiga"	Mike Rohl	Adam Lash & Cori Uchida	February 7, 2014	1.33
Alan and Dr. Jordan's work on decoding the virus is seeing progress, while Julia is being cured of what ails her by Dr. Hatake.
7	7	"Survivor Zero"	Mike Rohl	Sean Crouch	February 14, 2014	1.17
COO Constance Sutton of Ilaria Corporation arrives with mercenaries; Daniel Aerov, Dr. Hatake's adopted son & head of Security at the installation, makes a discovery; Dr. Julia Walker learns something about herself, and Dr. Hatake protects her from the mercenaries.
8	8	"Bloodline"	Bradley Walsh	Mark Thomas Haslett	February 21, 2014	1.48
Julia, feeling healthy and very hungry, plays a practical joke on Alan and Sarah. A vector breaks into a food storage area and contaminates the base's food supply. Constance tells Hatake that she has learned Julia's secret. Julia escapes into the base's ventilation ducts and Constance sends Ilaria security guards after Julia. As Anana is leaving the base, she finds a cold Balleseros trying to hotwire her snow vehicle. Anana realizes that Balleseros has used her, but he counters that he warned her not to trust him. An Ilaria guard informs Constance that Balleseros helped Anana escape the base. Constance tells Daniel that Hatake "has lost his way"; Daniel assures Constance that he is loyal to Ilaria. Hatake confronts Constance and kills her, taking back control of the base.
9	9	"Level X"	Bradley Walsh	Sean Crouch	February 28, 2014	1.28
Secrets come to the light and unlikely alliances are established; at the same time, Alan and Walker take on a dangerous mission to destroy what's left of the NARVIK viruses. Walker learns something world-shattering about her past.
10	10	"Fushigi"	Jeremiah Chechik	Misha Green	March 7, 2014	1.28
Alan and Julia travel to an abandoned satellite station in a last-ditch effort to call for help. Once there, they come across the truth behind Hatake's plan and Julia's condition. Meanwhile, Dr. Jordan (Sarah) makes a startling discovery of her own, which could mean a cure for cancer.
11	11	"Black Rain"	Jeremiah Chechik	Tiffany Greschler & Javier Grillo-Marxuach	March 14, 2014	1.18
Peter Farragut and vectors attempt to spread the virus in a desperate, final attempt. Meanwhile, the scientists of the CDC create a cure for the virus by working together, just as a threat from deadly mercenaries of the Ilaria Corporation threaten their very lives. The Ilaria assassin, The Scythe, kills the remaining survivors that have not yet made it to the bunker, and is then revealed to be a teenage boy.
12	12	"The Reaping"	Brad Turner	Story by : Adam Lash & Cori Uchida; Teleplay by : Cameron Porsandeh	March 21, 2014	1.24
The Scythe is revealed to be the immortal Spencer Chiswick, who has the outward appearance of a 16-year-old, and is Constance Sutton's son. Alan and Hatake lure Spencer and one of his agents outside where they plan to lay a trap; Hatake throws a canister, allegedly containing the virus, onto the snow and causes one of Spencer's operatives who attempts to retrieve the virus to fall into a chasm. Spencer learns Julia is Hatake's daughter and abducts her. He gives Hatake a choice of lives to save—Julia's or Daniel's, but Daniel sacrifices himself. Julia realizes that a package Spencer brought with him contains her mother.
13	13	"Dans L'ombre"	Brad Turner	Story by : Ed Decter; Teleplay by : Steven Maeda	March 28, 2014	1.38
Day 13: Balleseros agrees to hand over the virus, already reported in Puerto Rico, if Hatake turns over the list of displaced Inuit children. Peter is revealed as Ilaria's mole, and the source of the Narvik in Puerto Rico. Sarah learns she is pregnant. After killing her mother, Spencer "The Scythe" blows up the base, stealing the virus, its cure, and Julia. Alan tries to rescue her, but only succeeds in taking back either the virus or the cure. Day 235: Alan, along with Peter, searches in Paris for Julia, who is shown to now be an Ilaria executive.

=== Season 2 (2015) ===
No. overall	No. in season	Title	Directed by	Written by	Original release date	US viewers (millions)
14	1	"San Jose"	Steven A. Adelson	Steven Maeda	January 16, 2015	1.00
A CDC Rapid-Response team (Dr. Peter Farragut, Dr. Sarah Jordan, and Dr. Kyle Sommer) travels to a dead boat some distance into the Pacific from Seattle, checking for a Narvik outbreak. An immune passenger, hidden away on the boat, traces the non-Narvik pathogen to St. Germain Island, 400 miles from Seattle. The team are dropped there by the US Coast Guard. While trudging through the woods, the survivor runs off. After dark, they find her murdered in a cabin, where they are accosted by members of an island cult; they are brought back to the cult's compound for their "safety." Meanwhile, thirty years later, Julia travels to the same island in search of the source of the TXM-7 pathogen, and is captured by a mysterious environmentally-costumed questioner who repeatedly says to her "Do you know the way to San Jose?" His home is the same cabin in which the CDC team had been found by the cultists earlier. The costumed man, Caleb, shows her Alan's grave in the cemetery attached to the ruins of Brother Michael's compound.
15	2	"Reunion"	Steven A. Adelson	Timothy J. Lea	January 23, 2015	0.70
As the CDC team continues to investigate the island, a sick child appears, and Sarah discovers that Dr. Alan Farragut is posing as a cult member called "Brother Jerome." The child recovers overnight, but soon faces another ordeal. Sarah suspects that not all is right in the abbey; she confronts Alan in private, informs him of her pregnancy, and wants answers — but he will not provide them, and tells her the entire team is in mortal danger & must get off the island. Meanwhile, in the future, Julia and Caleb dig up Alan’s grave, and Julia makes a discovery that furthers the mystery of the island.
16	3	"Scion"	Jeremiah S. Chechik	Allison Miller	January 30, 2015	0.63
Sarah and Peter learn that there are infected people roaming the island. Brother Michael is researching grafting. The children of the abbey are given a plant-based drug, and they attack Kyle while under its influence. Alan investigates a storage room at the abbey. Meanwhile, in the future, Julia discovers Dr. Hatake, living in a cabin on the island, and an atypical family reunion ensues. He drugs her to find out why she's there, and she tells him of the TXM-7 pandemic that is even killing everyone, including immortals, and he discovers she is infected. She discovers he has gone crazy and is out of touch with reality.
17	4	"Densho"	Jeremiah S. Chechik	Tiffany Greshler	February 6, 2015	0.48
A worker is stung by a bee, develops the disease, kills his partner and later dies. Peter reveals he still works for Ilaria, contacting Major Balleseros at HQ, but does not know Alan is listening. Kyle investigates the bees & finds toxic honey. Sarah tries get Soren's mother Olivia to acknowledge he needs to be found, and then Olivia knifes her in the stomach. Meanwhile, in the future, Julia escapes from Hatake and family. A fight ensues and she ends up fatally wounding him in the process; before he dies, Hatake gives Julia his "legacy," his ancient katana named "Densho" — after the immortals.
18	5	"Oubliette"	Grant Harvey	Leigh Dana Jackson	February 13, 2015	0.44
In a flashback to three months ago, Kyle is recruited to the team by the CDC with instructions to gather intelligence on Alan so they can make an arrest. In the present, Peter reveals to Brother Michael that "Jerome" is actually Alan. Michael responds by putting both Peter and Alan in a dungeon. Alan escapes with Peter's help but leaves Peter behind because he overheard his conversation with Ilaria. The beehive is destroyed but two jars of honey are retained. Sarah is nursed back to health by Agnes who discovers she is immortal. Brother Michael is revealed to be immortal and he learns from Agnes that Sarah is as well. He then kills Agnes when she doubts his honesty. In the future, Julia recovers with Caleb's help but he leaves with "Densho" while she sleeps.
19	6	"M. Domestica"	Grant Harvey	Javier Grillo-Marxuach	February 20, 2015	0.47
Episode opens with Jules in bed with Sergio. The Ilaria Board votes to proceed with a plan to release NARVIK-C to reduce the world's population by 75%, with Julia being the lone dissenter. She plans to alert the CDC, but is asked to meet Mademoiselle Durant, who advises her to get help in St. Germain. She reveals to Sergio that she has a single dose of the cure. In the present, the CDC team sees that the disease is spread by fungus that resembles apple fungus, yet the apples themselves are not tainted. Sister Amy suspects that Brother Michael killed Sister Agnes, and is repulsed by the idea of bearing a child for him, so she seduces Landry to infect 83 followers with the tainted honey. She later she frames Sister Anne for the act. Amy visits Olivia in her confinement, and suggests to her that it would be beneficial if "someone" would make the CDC team "go away". When she leaves, she leaves the door open for Olivia to get out. Brother Michael suspects Peter is an immortal and tortures him with rats until he learns from Peter that Sarah is pregnant with an immortal child. He demands to know how she became immortal. Landry uses the plant-based drug on Alan and he attacks Sarah while under its influence.
20	7	"Cross-Pollination"	Steven A. Adelson	Adria Lang	February 27, 2015	0.46
Durant explains that in 1601, Michael married a woman who then bore a child from a different father. He swore it would not happen again and began work on a way to sterilize mortal men. In the present, Alan wakes up with vague memories of taking Sarah to a room where a bloody procedure was carried out. Later he does an ultrasound on her and they find the baby is gone. He tells her that he thinks he took her there and she accuses him of doing it on purpose. Michael expects Amy to bear many children for him despite her protests. He starts to lose control over the followers and decides it is time to "thin the crop", and prepares and administers poison to most of the uninfected followers by making them believe it is a cure to the disease plaguing the island.
21	8	"Vade in Pace"	Steven A. Adelson	Bobak Esfarjani	March 6, 2015	0.52
Amy entombs Michael alive in the dungeon and takes control of the abbey. The Coast Guard arrives to evacuate the CDC team to a neighboring island with an outbreak, but they stay to investigate a red sap that is prolonging the life of the infected. Sarah tells Kyle that she is immortal, and to prove it she eats some of the tainted honey. Amy reveals to Sarah that the baby is being kept alive in a tank, and offers to exchange it for the secret of immortality. In the future, Julia frees Michael and asks him to help find the baby, whose stem cells may hold the key to a cure. Michael tries to kill her, but is beheaded by Caleb with "Densho".
22	9	"Ectogenesis"	Jeremiah S. Chechik	Timothy J. Lea	March 13, 2015	0.55
Kyle is captured by infected who dine on the uninfected. He infects himself to avoid being eaten. Sarah reveals to Amy that a transfusion of spinal fluid from an immortal will grant immortality. Amy does not trust Sarah so Landry volunteers to be the first test subject. Julia and Sergio arrive on the island in the present to find Michael's method of sterilizing mortal men. The apples are the result; they are seedless because they are all grafted from a plant called "Mother". When they go to check on Mother, they find that it is missing.
23	10	"Mother"	Jeremiah S. Chechik	Tiffany Greshler	March 20, 2015	0.57
Kyle's condition worsens, as does the situation on the neighboring island. Soren leads the team to the Bleeding Tree. Amy retrieves Mother from its hiding place in the bell tower, and Landry and Sergio both fall from a great height. Anne shows Peter the full extent of Michael's gruesome breeding program. The test on Landry was a failure, which Sarah feels could be made to work with more research. Julia tells Amy that it would be faster to grant her immortality by implanting the baby in Amy's womb, to Sarah's horror.
24	11	"Plan B"	Jeff Renfroe	Leigh Dana Jackson & Adria Lang	March 27, 2015	0.52
Alan starts analyzing the red sap and Soren's blood, in hopes of finding a cure. Peter declares that nobody will leave the island, especially Alan. Julia and Sarah begin the procedure on Amy, who wakes up with the silvery eyes of an immortal. The Navy implements "Plan B", and sprays the island with an agent that kills on contact. This apparently eliminates the Coast Guard crew as well as damaging Mother. Amy quickly finds that she has been tricked.
25	12	"The Ascendant"	Jeff Renfroe	Javier Grillo-Marxuach & David Goldblum	April 3, 2015	0.54
Alan creates the cure and uses it on Kyle, and asks him to carry a sample of it off the island. Peter is renamed "Eli" and takes control of the abbey. His first order is to eliminate the CDC team. Soren's mother alerts them to the threat. Kyle, Sarah and Soren call in a helicopter to evacuate them, but the attempt is thwarted when Eli opens fire on it. Julia and Alan find that the abbey was built on top of the Mother Tree, and it has sufficient material to carry out the sterilization plan. Alan questions why she is doing it, especially since NARVIK-C may not even exist. They pull guns on each other and as the screen goes black, a shot rings out.
26	13	"O Brave New World"	Steven A. Adelson	Steven Maeda & Tiffany Greschler	April 10, 2015	0.44
Day 13: Julia tends to Alan's gunshot wound to the neck. When she leaves the room, Alan takes the samples from Mother to the Mother Tree, intending to set fire to it all. However, Eli traps him there and sets the fire around him. He is rescued by Julia. A helicopter evacuates everyone as the abbey burns. Day 14: At a hospital in Seattle, Kyle delivers the cure to the government, and convinces his superiors that Peter is the real criminal, who is subsequently arrested instead of Alan. Moments before being arrested, Peter gives the material from Mother to one of the heads of Ilaria, who denies ever saying anything about NARVIK-C. Alan nearly dies, but Sarah saves his life by making him immortal. In the year 2029: Any woman who wants a baby now must come to an Ilaria center. Sarah is seen working there. 30 years in the future: Caleb reveals himself to be Soren. He says that Alan and Hatake created the TXM-7 virus that is infecting the immortals. He offers his blood as a cure.

== Home media ==
The first season of Helix was released in DVD and Blu-ray Disc formats on June 30, 2014, for Region 2 and July 1, 2014, for Region 1. The Blu-ray Disc features two exclusives: Writing the Tension, an inside look at the process of writing a serialized thriller, and Fabricating the Plague, state-of-the-art effects techniques used in conception of the virus' appearance in stages to creating the right amount of gore for the plague. Both media formats contain commentary on the pilot episode with Billy Campbell and Cameron Porsandeh, commentary on "Dans L'Ombre" with Campbell and Steven Maeda, four featurettes, deleted scenes, and outtakes.

The series is currently available on Hulu

== Reception ==
Helix received generally positive reviews from critics. The first season holds a 79% critical approval on Rotten Tomatoes and 67% on Metacritic, while the second season has not been reviewed enough on either platform for a consensus. The critical consensus for season one described the show as "effectively creepy and oozing with chills" and that the show "unexpectedly digs deep into its world and its characters, with a suspenseful plot that continues to pique interest as it advances." Gail Pennington, for St. Louis Post-Dispatch, said of the first season: "you like this kind of thing or you don't, and I don't, particularly, but Helix is very involving." Reviewing the first season for The New York Times, Neil Genzlinger praised the acting. He felt that cast was "led admirably" by Billy Campbell as Dr. Alan Farragut, saying "Mr. Campbell is one of the busiest actors around" and despite the fact that "an abundance of work can sometimes lead to performances that feel phoned in", it doesn't feel that way here.

== See also ==
- Biological warfare in popular culture
- Genetic engineering in science fiction
- Immortality in science fiction
- PEPCK-Cmus mouse
- Global catastrophic risk § Biotechnology
