= Lauren Hammersley =

Canadian actress

Lauren Hammersley (born January 8, 1981) is a Canadian actress. She is best known for her roles as Lisa Mason on the CBC Television sitcom Mr. D and Charmaine on the Netflix romantic drama Virgin River.

== Early life ==
Hammersley was born in Campbell River, British Columbia in 1981.

She was raised in Surrey, British Columbia, Canada.

== Career ==
Hammersley started acting at age 12 in an ad for Fantastic Sand Surprises. In addition to acting, she worked as a photographer until working full time as an actor on Mr. D. in 2012 where she played Lisa Mason: who over the eight seasons, moves from a competent and responsible teacher, to principal, to step mother and PTA member with a vengeance, to guidance counselor.

In 2016, Hammersley played Adele in eight episodes of Orphan Black. She later starred in Virgin River (2019–present) as Charmaine Roberts, and in 2023 portrayed Connie Boyle in Sullivan's Crossing.

== Filmography ==
=== Film ===
Year	Title	Role	Notes
2006	Bloody Mary	Mary	
2009	Child Wild	Carmella Apples	Video
2013	Stag	Sarah	
2023	Christmas Island	Maggie Highes	Hallmark

=== Television ===
Year	Title	Role	Notes
2002	John Doe	Officer Fitzmaurice	Episode: "Idaho"
2011	Single White Spenny	Brooke	Episode: "Open Relationship"
2012–2018	Mr. D	Lisa Mason	Main role
2013	Saving Hope	Ariel	Episode: "Defense"
2016–17	Orphan Black	Adele	Recurring role (seasons 4–5)
2019–2026	Virgin River	Charmaine Roberts	Main role (seasons 1–4); recurring (seasons 5-7)
2023–present	Sullivan's Crossing	Connie Boyle	Recurring role
