= Patrick Sean Smith =

American television show creator, writer, and producer

- Occupations: Show creator, screenwriter, producer
- Years active: 2002–present
- Spouse: Carter Covington (m. 2008)
- Children: 1

Patrick Sean Smith is an American television show creator, writer, and producer.

== Filmography ==
- The Chronicle (2002) writer
- Everwood (2003-2004) writer
- Summerland (2005) writer
- Supernatural (2006) writer
- Greek (2007–2011) creator, writer, producer
- Chasing Life (2014–2015) writer, showrunner, producer
- Dolly Parton's Heartstrings (2019) producer, writer
- Virgin River (TV series) (2023) showrunner, producer, writer
