= Virgin River (TV series) =

2019 American drama television series

- Genre: Romantic drama
- Based on: Virgin River series by Robyn Carr
- Developed by: Sue Tenney
- Showrunners: Sue Tenney; Patrick Sean Smith
- Starring: Alexandra Breckenridge; Martin Henderson; Colin Lawrence; Jenny Cooper; Lauren Hammersley; Annette O'Toole; Tim Matheson; Benjamin Hollingsworth; Grayson Gurnsey; Sarah Dugdale; Zibby Allen; Marco Grazzini; Mark Ghanimé; Kai Bradbury; Kandyse McClure
- Music by: Jeff Garber
- Country of origin: United States
- Original language: English
- No. of seasons: 7
- No. of episodes: 74

Production
- Executive producers: Robyn Carr; Christopher E. Perry; Sue Tenney; Roma Roth; Jocelyn Freid; Amy Palmer Robertson; Patrick Sean Smith; Erin Cardillo; Richard Keith; Mary Page Keller; Thomas Ian Griffith; Jennifer Monroe
- Producer: Ian Hay
- Cinematography: David Pelletier; David J. Frazee; Toby Gorman
- Editors: Daria Ellerman; Nicole Ratcliffe; Lara Mazur; Kirk Hay; Adina Moore; Lianne Oelke
- Running time: 40–54 minutes

Original release
- Network: Netflix
- Release: December 6, 2019 – present

Virgin River is an American romantic drama television series developed by Sue Tenney for Netflix, adapted from the book series of the same name by Robyn Carr. The series centers on nurse practitioner Melinda "Mel" Monroe, who moves from Los Angeles to the remote Northern California town of Virgin River seeking a fresh start, and she discovers a tight-knit community and a budding romance with local bartender Jack Sheridan. The series is produced by Reel World Management and primarily filmed in British Columbia, Canada.

The series premiered on Netflix on December 6, 2019. The seventh season premiered on March 12, 2026, and in July 2025, ahead of the seventh season premiere, the series was renewed for an eighth season. In November 2026, ahead of the eighth season premiere, the series was renewed for an ninth season.

== Premise ==
Virgin River follows Melinda "Mel" Monroe, who answers an ad to work as a midwife and nurse practitioner in the remote Northern California town of Virgin River, thinking it will be the perfect place to start fresh and leave her painful memories behind. But she soon discovers that small-town living is not quite as simple as she expected.

== Cast ==
=== Main ===
Actor	Character	Seasons								
Actor	Character	1	2	3	4	5	6	7	8	9
Alexandra Breckenridge	Melinda "Mel" Monroe Sheridan	Main	Main	Main	Main	Main	Main	Main	Main	TBA
Martin Henderson	Jack Sheridan	Main	Main	Main	Main	Main	Main	Main	Main	TBA
Colin Lawrence	John "Preacher" Middleton	Main	Main	Main	Main	Main	Main	Main	Main	TBA
Jenny Cooper	Joey Barnes	Main	Guest	Recurring	Recurring	Recurring	Recurring	Recurring		
Lauren Hammersley	Charmaine Roberts	Main	Main	Main	Main	Recurring	Recurring	Recurring		
Annette O'Toole	Hope McCrea	Main	Main	Guest	Main	Main	Main	Main	Main	TBA
Tim Matheson	Vernon "Doc" Mullins	Main	Main	Main	Main	Main	Main	Main	Main	TBA
Ben Hollingsworth	Dan Brady	Recurring	Main	Main	Main	Main	Main	Main	Main	TBA
Grayson Gurnsey	Ricky Sudder	Recurring	Main	Main	Main		Guest			
Sarah Dugdale	Elizabeth "Lizzie"		Main	Main	Main	Main	Main	Main	Main	TBA
Zibby Allen	Brie Sheridan			Main	Main	Main	Main	Main	Main	TBA
Marco Grazzini	Mike Valenzuela		Recurring	Main	Main	Main	Main	Main		
Mark Ghanimé	Cameron Hayek				Main	Main	Main			
Kai Bradbury	Denny Cutler			Guest	Main	Main	Main	Main	Main	TBA
Kandyse McClure	Kaia Bryant					Main	Main	Main	Main	TBA

- Alexandra Breckenridge as Melinda "Mel" Monroe Sheridan, a nurse practitioner and midwife who moves to Virgin River from Los Angeles, hoping to leave bad memories behind
- Martin Henderson as Jack Sheridan, a local bar owner and former U.S. Marine, who has PTSD
- Colin Lawrence as John "Preacher" Middleton, a close Marine friend of Jack, who works as the chef at Jack's Bar.
- Jenny Cooper as Joey Barnes (season 1; guest season 2; recurring season 3–present), Mel's older sister who lives in Los Angeles
- Lauren Hammersley as Charmaine Roberts (seasons 1–4; recurring seasons 5–7), Jack's ex-girlfriend
- Annette O'Toole as Hope McCrea, the mayor of Virgin River and Doc's wife (seasons 1–2, 4–present; guest season 3)
- Tim Matheson as Vernon "Doc" Mullins, the local physician and Hope's husband
- Ben Hollingsworth as Dan Brady (season 2–present; also recurring season 1), a younger veteran who served in the Marines with Jack and is struggling to readjust to civilian life
- Grayson Gurnsey as Ricky (seasons 2–4; recurring season 1; guest season 6), a young man who works at Jack's Bar and wants to join the Marines as soon as he graduates from high school
- Sarah Dugdale as Lizzie (season 2–present), Connie's troublemaking niece from Los Angeles
- Zibby Allen as Brie Sheridan (season 3–present), Jack's sister.
- Marco Grazzini as Mike Valenzuela (seasons 3–7; recurring season 2), a Marine friend of Jack's who works as a police detective
- Mark Ghanimé as Dr. Cameron Hayek (seasons 4–6), the new doctor at Doc's clinic
- Kai Bradbury as Denny Cutler (season 4–present; guest season 3), Doc's grandson
- Kandyse McClure as Kaia Bryant (season 5–present), a firefighter who becomes Preacher's new love interest and eventual chief of Virgin River Fire Department

=== Recurring ===
- Daniel Gillies as Mark Monroe (also starring season 1; recurring season 3; guest seasons 2, 4), Mel's late husband, who is shown in flashbacks.
- Lexa Doig as Paige Lassiter (seasons 1, 4; guest seasons 2, 5), the owner of a bakery truck named "Paige's Bakeaway" and mother of Christopher
- Lynda Boyd as Lilly (seasons 1–3; guest season 4), a friend of Connie and Hope
- Nicola Cavendish as Connie, one of Hope's friends who runs the town's general store and a member of Virgin River's knitting circle. She also later takes over and runs Paige's Bakeaway.
- Ian Tracey as Jimmy (seasons 1–2, 6; guest seasons 3–5), Calvin's right-hand man, who ends up in prison
- David Cubitt (seasons 1–2, 4; guest seasons 3, 5) and Josh Blacker (season 6) as Calvin, the man who ran the illegal pot farm on the other side of Virgin River and the father of Charmaine's twins
- Teryl Rothery as Muriel, an actress and a rival of Hope's and a member of Virgin River's knitting circle
- Gwynyth Walsh as Jo Ellen, a member of Virgin River's knitting circle who put Mel up while her cabin is renovated
- Christina Jastrzembska as Lydie, Ricky's grandmother, a member of Virgin River's knitting circle.
- Chase Petriw as Christopher (seasons 1–4; guest season 5), Paige's son who forms a close bond with Preacher
- Trevor Lerner as Bert Gordon (seasons 2–present; guest season 1), Virgin River's resident Tow-Truck Driver
- Steve Bacic as Wes (season 2; guest seasons 3–5), Paige's estranged abusive husband, and Vince, his identical twin. Michael Shanks also portrayed Wes in season 1.
- Keith MacKechnie as Nick (seasons 2–present), Jo Ellen's husband, co-owner of the local BnB and former mayor of Virgin River
- Carmel Amit as Jamie (season 2; guest season 6), a restaurant-owner visiting Virgin River who connects with Preacher
- Chad Rook as Spencer (season 2; guest season 1), one of Calvin's workers
- Patrick Sabongui as Todd Masry (season 3), Charmaine's wealthy fiancé
- Lucia Walters as Julia (seasons 3–5), an Aikido teacher that Preacher dated
- Stacey Farber as Tara Anderson (seasons 3–5; guest season 6), Lilly's daughter
- Clare Filipow as Hannah (seasons 3–present), a server at Jack's Bar
- Barbara Pollard as Melissa Montgomery (seasons 4–5), Jo Ellen's sister-in-law, who runs the lumber company
- Libby Osler as Ava Anderson (season 5; guest season 6), Lilly's daughter, Tara's sister
- Elise Gatien as Lark (seasons 5–6), a woman who befriends Brady
- Gabrielle Rose as Amelia Sheridan (season 5–present), Brie and Jack's mother
- John Allen Nelson as Everett Reid (guest season 5; recurring season 6–present), Mel's biological father
  - Callum Kerr as Everett (season 6), Mel's father in the 1970s flashbacks
- Jessica Rothe as Sarah Jensen (season 6), Mel's mother in the 1970s flashbacks
- Sara Canning as Victoria (season 7), an investigator for the state medical board
- Cody Kearsley as Clay (season 7)
- Mitchell Slaggert as Eddie (season 8)
- Natasha Calis as Dr. Astrid (season 8)

== Episodes ==
Season	Episodes		Originally released
1	10		December 6, 2019
2	10		November 27, 2020
3	10		July 9, 2021
4	12		July 20, 2022
5	12	10	September 7, 2023
5	12	2	November 30, 2023
6	10		December 19, 2024
7	10		March 12, 2026

=== Season 1 (2019) ===
No. overall	No. in season	Title	Directed by	Written by	Original release date
1	1	"Carry On"	Jann Turner	Sue Tenney	December 6, 2019
Nurse practitioner Mel Monroe moves to remote town Virgin River from Los Angeles to start a new job. She was hired for a one-year contract by Hope McCrea, the town's mayor, to assist the town doctor, Vernon Mullins. She is provided lodging at the McCrea Lodge. Mel meets Jack Sheridan, the bartender and owner of Jack's Bar, which he runs with his friend Preacher. The next day, when Mel arrives at Doc Mullins' office, they immediately disagree over how to run the clinic. Jack's fellow Marine, Brady, comes back to town, and Jack gives him a job working at the bar. Hope speaks with Doc regarding Mel, expressing that he needs help, whether he admits it or not. He agrees to give Mel 30 days probation. Mel treats a young pregnant lady at the practice suffering with Braxton Hicks contractions. Doc reacts very strongly to this, causing Mel to give Hope her notice. Later, Jack finds a baby in a laundry basket on Doc's front porch.
2	2	"Lost"	Jann Turner	Debra Fordham	December 6, 2019
Mel gives the baby girl, who she names Chloe after her older sister, a check-up at Doc's office. Chloe will not take a bottle, which frustrates Mel immensely. An indignant Doc Mullins arrives and takes charge. Connie, the town's general store owner and resident gossip, begins calling people in town to try and discover the mother. Doc Mullins is not keen on having Mel around, as per usual. Jack offers to help renovate the McCrea Cabin to convince Mel to stay in Virgin River. Meanwhile, Hope pleads with Doc to give Mel a chance and let her do her job. Mel finally decides to call Child Protective Services against the wishes of Doc, as they are required to by law. When he finds out, Doc fires her. A local woman, Lilly, offers to watch the baby while Mel takes a break. Upon her return, she discovers Lilly in the back room and is shocked to see her breastfeeding the baby.
3	3	"...And Found"	Andy Mikita	Amy Palmer Robertson	December 6, 2019
Lilly admits to being the baby's mother; her husband died recently, and Mel thinks she is suffering from postpartum depression. Hope and Doc continue to fight over Mel's employment at the clinic. Jack takes Mel and Chloe on a picnic, and Chloe finally takes a bottle. The group tries to convince Lilly to keep her baby, but she refuses. Eventually, Mel reveals to her that she had a stillborn baby, and Lilly agrees to keep Chloe, although she will be placed with her daughter for the time being. Hope has a heart attack. Charmaine introduces herself as Jack's girlfriend to Mel, who is evidently confused.
4	4	"A Wounded Heart"	Andy Mikita	Sue Tenney	December 6, 2019
Hope doesn't seem to be taking her heart attack very seriously. Jack comes over with a quiche for her; Mel meets him coldly. Jack is offhand about his relationship with Charmaine, implying that she thinks it's more serious than he does. Hope decides she and Doc should finally get a divorce, after twenty years of separation. Charmaine shows up to surprise Jack. She and Mel exhibit a mutual dislike for each other. Jack attempts to drive Mel to a local farm, but gets a flat tire on the way, and they are left stranded on the road. Paige is mistaken for someone named Michelle by a passerby in the bar. This, along with her lack of any bank accounts, implies something suspicious.
5	5	"Under Fire"	Martin Wood	Debra Fordham	December 6, 2019
Jack and Mel are taken to one of the pot camps so Mel can treat Calvin, the boss, for a bullet wound. She later helps one of the residents, a young woman, give birth. Doc tracks them down and retrieves them after Hope is alerted to their disappearance by a phone call from Mel's sister. Hope is revealed to be treating Charmaine with distaste because her mother was a close friend that had an affair with Doc while they were still together. She later gives Charmaine the benefit of the doubt. Jack offers to sleep in Mel's room, as they are both still shaken from the encounter. She finds him in a night terror about his time in the Marines.
6	6	"Let's Mingle"	Martin Wood	Amy Palmer Robertson	December 6, 2019
Mel's sister Joey comes to visit just as the town is preparing for the Moonlight Mingle, an annual dance. The two argue about Mel's future. Doc sets up a meeting with a lawyer so he and Hope can finalize their divorce but is frustrated by her absence at the appointment. However, he soon realises how much his affair actually hurt her. Mel finds out Joey's husband wants to get a divorce as well and confronts her drunk sister about it. Paige sees a man and becomes erratic when she momentarily can't find her son, Christopher. Jack is truthful to Charmaine about where he stands in their relationship. He later punches Brady after he makes insinuations about him and Mel.
7	7	"If Truth Be Told"	Gail Harvey	Patrick Moss	December 6, 2019
Jack and Mel check on Ricky's diabetic grandmother, Lydie. When taking Lydie to the hospital, Mel flashes back to the circumstances surrounding her husband's death. Hope argues with some other town women while playing cards. While helping Paige with her car, Preacher notices packed bags and a driver's license registered to someone named Michelle Logan. As she has been avoiding his calls, Jack visits Charmaine at work, who suspects his lack of commitment has something to do with Mel's arrival. The two separate. Mel takes off her wedding ring. Jack notices the removed ring, and with difficulty, Mel tells Jack her husband is dead and she believes it's her fault.
8	8	"Into the Light"	Gail Harvey	Debra Fordham	December 6, 2019
Mel wakes from a nightmare about Mark's death. The town gathers at Jack's Bar due to the storm and power outage in town. Preacher searches for information about Paige's situation and finds out that her real name is indeed Michelle Logan and that she is wanted by the FBI. Mel helps the town mechanic with a boxer's fracture. Charmaine asks Hope to give Jack a box of his stuff. Of course, Hope meddles and reads the letter inside the box. Jack shows Mel her newly remodeled cabin, and the two kiss.
9	9	"Everybody Has a Secret"	Tim Matheson	Sue Tenney & Jackson Rock	December 6, 2019
Mel and Jack agree to a date. Mel and Doc argue about her place at the clinic. Hope confronts Charmaine about the letter, which does not go very well. Mel and Doc save a local family whose well is poisoned from the pot growers' fertilizer. Whilst at the hospital, Doc agrees to keep Mel for the rest of her contract, and has a flashback of losing a patient. Jack and Mel go on their date. They kiss again, and she invites him to come over in the morning. Preacher confronts Paige, who becomes agitated but promises to meet him at the bar. Jack finally reads the letter from Charmaine and learns she is pregnant.
10	10	"Unexpected Endings"	Tim Matheson	Sue Tenney & Amy Palmer Robertson	December 6, 2019
Jack and Charmaine meet to discuss her pregnancy. Jack meets Mel, as promised, at her house that morning, but quickly leaves. Brady quits his job at Jack's Bar. Hope carelessly reveals to Mel that Charmaine is pregnant. Paige reveals that she was divorced by her abusive husband and later fled with their son despite not having custody. Hope tells Jack about her mistake, and he angrily forbids her from being involved in his personal life. Charmaine confronts Mel. She flashes back to the automobile collision in which her husband was killed. Hope reveals to Doc she doesn't want to get divorced. Preacher visits Paige's house, finding blood on the floor. Mel tells Jack she can't cope with Charmaine's pregnancy; Jack tells Mel he's falling in love with her. Mel packs her things and calls Joey to say she's going home.

=== Season 2 (2020) ===
No. overall	No. in season	Title	Directed by	Written by	Original release date
11	1	"New Beginnings"	Andy Mikita	Sue Tenney	November 27, 2020
Mel says goodbye to Mark at his gravestone, determined to return to town. Back in Virgin River, Jack is doing his best to take care of a pregnant Charmaine. Hope and Doc are secretly seeing each other again; to throw people off their scent, Hope gives Muriel the go ahead to ask Doc out. Mel bumps into Jack and Charmaine at Doc's office, making Charmaine very upset. Jack tries to convince Mel to give their relationship a chance but Mel won't relent. Doc asks Mel to help with Charmaine's treatment as she may have a high-risk pregnancy. She finally agrees, and talks to Hope about Charmaine staying at her house until she recovers. Brady attempts to get his job back at the bar, but Jack refuses. Paige's ex-husband pays her a visit.
12	2	"Taken by Surprise"	Andy Mikita	Amy Palmer Robertson	November 27, 2020
Jack comes to Mel's rescue during a break-in at the clinic. Charmaine moves into Hope's house. Mel and Jack argue about Jack being too harsh on Hope. Muriel asks Doc on a date. Paige pushes her ex-husband down the stairs in self-defense and calls Preacher when the situation takes a turn. Hope tries to annoy Charmaine out of her house. Doc and Hope continue their secret relationship. Preacher and Paige come up with a plan to hide Wes's body. Mel goes to the bar to clear the air with Jack. Her car breaks down after a heated discussion, so Jack gives her a ride back to the cabin, where they spend the night together.
13	3	"The Morning After"	Gail Harvey	Lisa Marie Petersen	November 27, 2020
Jack and Mel wake up happily together but decide to remain friends. Jack secures the clinic with a deadbolt after a break-in. Charmaine's health worsens, and she refuses an IV, sparking disagreement between Mel and Doc. Connie's troubled niece, Lizzie, arrives, and Hope offers to show her around. Brady becomes the logging company manager. Jack confronts growers about the clinic break-in. Preacher struggles to maintain the story of Paige's sudden absence. Muriel invites Doc to a concert. Charmaine eventually accepts Mel's help with an IV. Lizzie misuses Hope's credit card, and Brady has a tense encounter with Preacher. Mel discusses her feelings for Jack with Joey. An ultrasound reveals that Jack and Charmaine are expecting twins.
14	4	"Rumor Has It"	Gail Harvey	Jackson Rock	November 27, 2020
Jack discusses the challenges of having twins with Mel and teaches her to fish. Charmaine is upset over Jack and Mel's intimate encounter. Doc and Muriel attend a Vivaldi concert together. Lizzie seeks help from Mel, while Ricky develops feelings for her. Mel notices scrutiny at the Virgin River 33rd Community Picnic and Fundraiser, where the town is divided into Team Mel and Team Charmaine. Connie keeps Paige's bakery running, and Brady, representing Emerald Lumber, buys Lilly's farm. Ricky confesses the gossip to Mel, who confronts Charmaine about spreading rumors. Lizzie sets her sights on Brady. Connie discovers a prescription for contraceptives in Lizzie's purse. Doc is disappointed when Hope refuses to run the egg race, leading him to partner with Muriel. Mel and Jack win the race, while Ricky is left partnerless. Jack confronts Brady about Calvin's operation. Stacey, Mel's sister-in-law, visits to retrieve Mark's heirloom engagement ring.
15	5	"Can't Let Go"	Martin Wood	Jackson Sinder	November 27, 2020
While hiking, Stacey lets Mel know how unwanted she was by Mark's family. Mike, an LAPD officer and Jack's army buddy, comes to town, making Calvin suspicious. Connie angrily confronts Mel about the birth control prescription she gave Lizzie. Brady learns Emerald Lumber's and Calvin's real purpose, muling Fentanyl. Calvin tags Brady as his potential successor. Preacher confides in Connie about Paige's situation. Jack and his army buddies have a reunion, without Brady, but it brings back bad memories. Jack brings Charmaine a canine companion. Jamie is impressed with Preacher's culinary skills and refined palate. Doc and Hope go to a dance class with Muriel. Ricky tries to impress Lizzie but compromises his morals. Mel continues to hear more unpleasantness from Stacey and visits Charmaine to give her some blood test results. Stacey leaves Virgin River, upset with Mel's decision to keep the ring.
16	6	"Out of the Past"	Martin Wood	Sue Tenney	November 27, 2020
Mel searches for a tribute to honor Mark. Muriel continues to pursue Doc, who makes it clear he wants Hope. Ricky feels guilty about betraying Jack's trust, while Lilly rejects Brady's contract. Charmaine's health improves, allowing her to leave Hope's house. Jack takes friends kayaking, but concerns arise due to his previous night's drinking. Hope apologizes to Muriel, who is determined not to lose Doc. Mike needs evidence for Calvin's illegal activities. Jack struggles after his friends leave, sharing insecurities with Mel. Mel persuades Jack not to tackle dangerous rapids. Charmaine shows Jack baby items, and he opens up about fatherhood concerns. Ricky and Lizzie are in a car crash, and a body is found in the forest by the sheriff.
17	7	"Breaking Point"	Tim Matheson	Amy Palmer Robertson	November 27, 2020
On the anniversary of Mark's death, Mel tries to get through the day as normally as possible. Doc and Hope plan to go on a public date, which makes Hope freak out. Jack and Charmaine make a birth plan, but they have different opinions on how it should go. Hope talks to Preacher about her date that evening with Doc. Mel shares with Charmaine about the loss of her own baby and encourages Charmaine to take the safest birth option. Doc takes Hope to a restaurant in Arcata instead of the bar, where they run into Muriel. Lizzie and Ricky are goofing around in the bakery truck when things take a romantic turn. Muriel horns in on Doc and Hope's date, and Hope acts to take back control of the evening. Mel finds an unexpected letter in her mail. Brady comes to the bar to talk to Jack; Jack reveals that the body found in the forest is identified as Leo, the man who held up Mel for OxyContin. Jack warns Brady that this is how people who work for Calvin end up. Preacher and Connie meet up, worried about the body. Mel tearfully shows Jack the letter she received—it was an item for Mark that was forwarded to her from her old address.
18	8	"Blindspots"	Tim Matheson	Lisa Marie Petersen	November 27, 2020
A drunken Jack injures himself during demolition for a nursery, and Mel apologizes while patching him up. Connie creates an alibi for Preacher regarding Wes's potential discovery. Hope and Jack tour a house he's considering buying. An epidemic hits town, and Mel and Doc clash while addressing it. Lizzie invites Ricky over in Connie's absence. Jack discusses a potential witness, Spencer, with connections to Calvin's illegal activities. Charmaine considers moving to Portland. Mike plans to use RICO against Calvin. Jack's new server, George, exhibits strange symptoms. Calvin pressures Brady to kill Spencer, who is cooperating with the police. Mel and Jack discover George intentionally poisoned the town's food on Calvin's orders in retaliation for Spencer's cooperation.
19	9	"Hazards Ahead"	Martin Wood	Amy Palmer Robertson	November 27, 2020
Mel receives an early call from Jack, treating a lost hiker he found. Hope grapples with whether to tell Jack about Charmaine's move. Doc heads to a medical conference in Seattle, leaving Preacher anxious about Wes's discovery. Jack's house deal falters amid his search for Spencer and confrontation with Calvin. Hope learns Muriel is also in Seattle. Preacher worries as Wes's vehicle is found. Charmaine and Mel team up to locate Jack, who is captured by Brady and Jimmy. Charmaine reveals her potential move to Portland. The sheriff informs Preacher about Wes being a wanted man. Calvin releases Jack, warning him to stay away from the pot camp. Connie returns to an unexpected scene with Ricky. Doc returns from Seattle to a surprising revelation from Hope. Jack vents at the batting cage after learning about Brady's actions. Mel confesses her love to Jack.
20	10	"Blown Away"	Martin Wood	Sue Tenney	November 27, 2020
Hope realizes her mistake about Doc's answering machine message. Connie confronts Ricky and Lydie, but Lydie defends her grandson. Preacher accepts the San Francisco offer after Jack rejects a partnership. Doc invites Mel to his recommitment ceremony. Charmaine mistakes Jack's house purchase as a sign of commitment, but he clarifies. Ricky thanks Lydie and receives grandmotherly advice. Mel confronts Brady at the lumber yard about Spencer. Charmaine, feeling rejected, asserts control over the twins' future. Lizzie apologizes to Hope. Brady shows Mel Spencer's grave, and Vince, Wes's twin, warns Preacher about Michelle/Paige. Mel shows Jack a video proving Spencer is alive. Jamie bids farewell to Preacher. Mike informs Jack about taking down Emerald Lumber. Preacher receives troubling news about Paige/Michelle. Doc has medical news for Hope, interrupted by friends. Mel finds Jack shot on the bar floor.

=== Season 3 (2021) ===
No. overall	No. in season	Title	Directed by	Written by	Original release date
21	1	"Where There's Smoke..."	Martin Wood	Sue Tenney	July 9, 2021
A recovered Jack hosts a graduation party for Ricky. Hope is stranded due to a hurricane, and Muriel takes care of Doc in her absence. Brie, Jack's sister, visits. Jack and Ricky share a moment, and Mel reflects on her struggles with pregnancy. Charmaine introduces her new fiancé, Todd, and Mel receives birthday flowers from Joey. Preacher takes Christopher to camp. Ricky and Lizzie's relationship is a secret, causing paranoia. Doc considers his replacement. Jack plans a surprise for Mel's birthday. Brady unknowingly flirts with Jack's sister. Doc seeks news from Hope. Jack's house catches fire, but he and Mel escape unharmed.
22	2	"Sticky Feet"	Martin Wood	Amy Palmer Robertson	July 9, 2021
Jack's house is destroyed by the fire, leading him to stay at Mel's cabin, though he's initially hesitant. Doc grows more concerned about Hope's absence and begins interviews for his replacement. Ricky and Lizzie struggle with the secrecy of their relationship. Brie extends her stay in Virgin River. Lilly appears unusually exhausted, and Tara worries about her workload. Brady works for Emerald Lumber, which seems financially strained. Muriel continues to involve herself in Doc's life. Ricky surprises Lizzie with a getaway, still paranoid about getting caught. Brie and Brady have a drink in Clear River. Charmaine apologizes to Jack and shares details about her relationship with Todd. Mel checks on worried Doc. Jack asks Mel to stay at her cabin, and Lilly reveals to Mel that she has cancer.
23	3	"Spare Parts and Broken Hearts"	Monika Mitchell	Sue Tenney	July 9, 2021
Lilly discloses her Stage 4 pancreatic cancer diagnosis and designates Mel as an emergency contact. Mel receives a certified letter from Stacie announcing her pregnancy. Brie spends time with Brady after a night together. The ladies discuss supporting Doc during Hope's absence. Preacher reveals Paige's medical consent letter for Christopher. Parker, Lizzie's ex, arrives in town. Doc books a flight to find Hope in Port Royal. Parker meets Ricky at Jack's bar. Parker proposes a partnership to Lizzie, planning to open a club in L.A. Christopher is upset when Preacher denies a sleepover request. Brie quits her job, sharing the news with Jack. Jack is angered by Todd's influence on Charmaine's birthing decision. Ricky explores a Marine Corps recruitment center. Lilly visits Doc at night, revealing Hope is on the phone. Mike informs Jack of Jimmy's custody.
24	4	"Take My Breath Away"	Monika Mitchell	Amy Palmer Robertson	July 9, 2021
Jack finds Mel sleeping in the back seat of her car, which makes him feel he's imposing on her. Hope tells Doc she's staying in South Carolina a while longer to help her aunt. Mike and Jack discuss Jimmy's involvement in Jack's shooting. Joey's divorce is progressing. Preacher tells Jack that Jamie offered him a job in San Francisco, but then the Christopher situation came up. Brady learns that Emerald Lumber isn't really viable as a legitimate business. Jack wonders why Brie is still there. Tara discusses her concerns about Lilly with Doc. Christopher has a health scare. Mel questions Doc about why she's not involved with the interviews after listening to a voicemail. Jack learns that Jimmy is in custody and approaches him at the station where he learns that Calvin knows he was responsible for the raid. Connie is still behaving controllingly toward Lizzie, and Lizzie takes an abrupt step to stop it. Jack has some romantic surprises for Mel. Brie's past comes back to haunt her. Mel asks Jack an emotionally loaded question.
25	5	"Kindling"	Martin Wood	Lisa Marie Petersen	July 9, 2021
Charmaine tells Jack that Todd wants a meal with him. Lydie isn't happy that Lizzie moved in with her and Ricky. Todd shows off his money to Jack before telling him that he wants to buy Jack off and out of the twins' lives by his legally adopting the twins. This offer upsets Jack and causes him to question Todd's motives. After interviewing a very promising new doctor, Doc tells Mel the real reason he's been interviewing doctors, stunning her. Lilly reveals her cancer and diagnosis to Doc and binds him to a problematic promise not to tell a still-absent Hope before Lilly does. Lilly admits to Tara about her diagnosis. Christopher grows mad with Preacher when he has to bail on plans with them to work an important party. Jack begins to remember pieces of the night he was shot. Brie reveals to Mel that Jack had been married before.
26	6	"Jack and Jill"	Martin Wood	Jackson Sinder	July 9, 2021
Brie survives passing out and Jack and Mel learn of her Xanax usage. Due to the person running the Lumberjack Games being sick, others in town pick up the slack. Lilly learns that Tara told others in town of Lilly's diagnosis. Christopher shows interest in chainsaws much to Preacher's fear. Charmaine is forced to give up the dog to keep Todd. Jack learns that Brady doesn't have an alibi and is the primary suspect in his shooting from Mike. Brie opens up to Mel about her brief and painful past. Lizzie is upset with Ricky for not wanting to live together. Jack and Mel compete in the Jack and Jill contest and they spend the time disagreeing about their relationship and future. Preacher grows unnerved when Christopher briefly goes missing. Doc enjoys a win before the worsening of his visual condition must end a particularly enjoyable part of his life. Lizzie is still upset with Ricky.
27	7	"Split"	Gail Harvey	Jackson Rock	July 9, 2021
Tara suffers a stress-induced seizure, raising concerns about the farm's future. Preacher unintentionally makes Connie feel unneeded in Christopher's life. Jack receives distressing news about his fire-damaged land. Mike questions Brady again about Jack's shooting, causing tension with Brie. Lizzie and Ricky navigate the dynamics of their relationship. Doc puts the search for a new doctor on hold, emphasizing the clinic's importance in his life. Lizzie moves back in with Connie. Doc confides in Mel about a serious eye condition, requesting confidentiality. Preacher reconciles with Connie. Jack recalls Brady's presence during the shooting and angrily confronts him. Seeking legal advice, Jack learns bleak news about custody options, prompting him to break up with Mel to protect her desires for motherhood. He immediately regrets the decision.
28	8	"Life and Death"	Gail Harvey	Sue Tenney & Amy Palmer Robertson	July 9, 2021
Hope calls Doc, but is surprised when Muriel answers his phone. Hope is still in the dark about Lilly's health. Lilly asks her friends to take care of her children after her pending death. A heartbroken Mel goes to L.A. to support Joey during her divorce hearing; while there, Mel makes a sudden decision about the remaining embryos from her IVF journey with Mark. Ricky continues to hide his possible enlistment from Lizzie. Jack decides to fight to keep Mel in his life. Charmaine learns that Todd wants them to move to Eureka instead of staying in Clear River in hopes of derailing Jack. Doc drops in at the farm to check on Lilly, Tara, and Chloe and accepts an invite to stay for dinner. Lilly goes to take a catnap before dinner; when Tara goes to call Lilly for dinner, Tara finds that Lilly has passed away in her sleep.
29	9	"The Sun Also Rises"	Martin Wood	Amy Palmer Robertson	July 9, 2021
The town prepares to bid farewell to Lilly. Brie experiences a surprise miscarriage, and Lilly's funeral is marked by heartfelt recollections of her kindness and love. Tara struggles to speak about her mother during the service, with Mel's assistance. Brady visits Brie, unaware of her miscarriage, expressing his love for her. Jack and Mel have a serious conversation about their relationship at the funeral reception. Hope misses Lilly's funeral, texting Doc that she needs time alone. Lizzie invites Ricky to a wedding, learning he plans to enlist in the Marines. Charmaine confides in Jack about Todd's decision to move without consulting her. Mel comforts Tara after the funeral, and Jack and Mel decide to reconcile. Doc receives news that Hope has been seriously injured in a car accident.
30	10	"A Wedding, No Funeral and a Baby"	Martin Wood	Sue Tenney	July 9, 2021
Mel discovers that her IVF procedure in L.A. was successful, leading to internal debate about when and how to share the pregnancy news with Jack. Doc remains devoted to Hope in the hospital. Jack seeks an update on the partnership offer from Preacher, who decides to join. Mel and Brie have lunch, and Brie reveals plans to leave town for a fresh start. Preacher's meeting with Paige's friend has concerning consequences for him and Christopher. Charmaine informs Jack of her sudden marriage to Todd and clarifies Todd's desire to exclude Jack from the twins' lives. Calvin, now free, pressures Brady to continue running drugs for Emerald Lumber. Lizzie tells Ricky she loved him but suggests they move on. Tara discloses the existence of an anonymous trust for her and Chloe. Brady attempts to convince Brie to stay, interrupted by a sheriff's search warrant. Parker encourages Lizzie to reconsider their relationship. A stranger arrives at Fitch's, claiming to be Doc Mullins' grandson. Muriel visits the exhausted Doc at the hospital. Brady is arrested on suspicion of Jack's attempted murder after a gun is found in his Jeep. As Mel and Jack watch the sunrise, he reflects on their love story. Encouraged by Jack's vulnerability, Mel reveals her pregnancy but admits uncertainty about the father.

=== Season 4 (2022) ===
No. overall	No. in season	Title	Directed by	Written by	Original release date
31	1	"Be My Baby"	Martin Wood	Sue Tenney	July 20, 2022
Jack and Mel are still together preparing for the baby, with Jack not wanting to know who the father is and not telling anyone the news yet. Later, Mel tells Joey about her pregnancy. Brie gets a job offer and decides to stay in Virgin River. Hope is home from hospital after suffering a head injury - not remembering Lilly's death. Dr. Cameron Hayek starts working at the practice and the women of Virgin River are very curious. Preacher is looking for Christopher in secret with only a handful of people really knowing that he was taken by Vince. Doc tells Hope about Lilly's death and then his grandson, Denny arrives at his door. Jack remembers what happened the night he was shot and realizes that it was Vince who shot him. An innocent Brady is stabbed in jail and left for dead.
32	2	"Father Knows Best...?"	Martin Wood	Amy Palmer Robertson	July 20, 2022
33	3	"Grilled"	Nimisha Mukerji	Lisa Marie Petersen	July 20, 2022
Mel arranges a dinner for Jack and the new MD to foster a connection. Jack and Brie discuss family matters, and Brie decides to stay in Virgin River. Mel comforts grieving parents after the loss of a stillborn baby. Connie apologizes to Preacher for Christopher being taken by Vince. Jack and the new Doctor plan a BBQ dinner. Hope grapples with memory issues and apologizes to Tara, viewing her as the closest thing to her mom. Mel advises Doc to tell Hope about his grandson to prevent her hearing it elsewhere. Doc regrets not meeting his son before his death, sharing experiences of heartache. Brie investigates Brady's lumber company, suspecting a frame-up. Ricky attempts to apologize to Lizzie, but she rebuffs him. Preacher spends time with a martial arts instructor who was also Doc's headhunter. An unknown person posts bail for Brady. Mel encounters an elderly man collapsing while looking for his car. Jack and the new MD spend time together, revealing differences in their military views. Hope and Doc discuss Doc having a grandson named Denny, bringing her joy. Jack suspects the new MD's interest in Mel, and he learns that his mom is in love with her art teacher. Brie visits Brady, expressing a desire to help him feel better.
34	4	"Serious As A..."	Nimisha Mukerji	Tesia Joy Walker	July 20, 2022
Jack surprises Mel with a gift while he remodels the bar. Brie discovers Brady's escape plan and tells him Calvin threatened her at the hospital; she convinces him to lay a trap for Calvin. Mel plans a surprise trip for Jack, enlisting Preacher for help. Denny and Ricky meet. Hope admits it's hard for her to leave the house, worrying Doc. Doc and Hope visit the gardens, reminiscing about their first kiss and discussing meeting Denny. Cameron babysits Chloe so Tara can rest. Charmaine tells Jack they're having boys; Jack is upset with the delayed news. Julia and Preacher bond over food, but when questioned by Jack, Preacher says he wants to prioritize finding Chris. Struggling with Hope, he discusses with Mel the lack of improvement seen in Hope. Lizzie and Denny discuss Lizzie's relationship with Ricky, and Lizzie asks Denny to perform with her in place of Ricky at the Renaissance Fair. Muriel visits Hope and Doc with Doc hoping Hope will join them in playing a game, which she denies. Jack tells Mel he can't go with Mel to Eureka, but with last minute help from Preacher & co. they go on a plane ride. During the flight, the pilot, Brad, suffers a heart attack mid air.
35	5	"Mayday"	Martin Wood	Natasha M. Hall	July 20, 2022
Mel cares for Brad while Jack tries to land the plane. After Hope and friends sew the costumes, Lizzie and Ricky rehearse for the Renaissance Fair in front of Connie. Brie and Mike team up to investigate who paid Brady's bond. Jack confronts Brady about the night he was shot and whether he saw anything in the parking lot. Preacher and Julia talk about their lives and kiss. Jack tells Mel about his talk with Brady. Mel continues to push Jack on the paternity test. Jack admits he is worried that the baby may be Mark's and about how he would feel if it were. Hope canceled her MD appt and Doc confronts her about it. Denny moves into the room at the clinic.
36	6	"All's Faire..."	Martin Wood	Jackson Rock	July 20, 2022
Virgin River has its annual Renaissance Faire, this year chaired by Muriel. Chris Lonergan's brother, Tim, stops by to deliver a letter to Jack to help ease his pain over losing Chris. Hope and Doc argue because Hope lied about cancelling her appointment; eventually Hope apologizes for her attitude with a little push from Connie. Hope meets Denny and invites him to stay with her. Nick, Connie, Ricky, and Lizzie perform at the faire. Meanwhile, Mel tries to figure out whether the medicine cabinet was left open overnight without letting Doc know she suspects Denny. Julia brings her niece Maya to the faire, and Preacher teaches her how to shoot an arrow. Mel and Preacher worry that meeting Tim has rattled Jack. Brie tries to have Jack and Brady make peace. Mel comes clean about seeing Denny going through the medicine cabinet. Midway through the knights' duel, Jack has flashbacks to Iraq, further worrying Mel and Preacher. Brady meets with Calvin and makes a deal. Jack reads Chris' letter, and complications arise for Mel.
37	7	"Otherwise Engaged"	Siobhan Devine	Jackson Sinder	July 20, 2022
Mel confronts Jack about being unconscious when she needed help. Joey surprises Mel with news in Virgin River. Mike calls Brady, causing concern for Brie. Hope and Denny bond, while an accident sends Doc and Cameron into the woods. Mel questions Joey about her news. Hope rejoins the knitting circle at the bar, and Denny invites Lizzie to cook dinner for Doc and Hope. The ladies trick Hope back into the group with a purpose. Brady and Mike discuss turning Jimmy and ask for Brady's help. Jack talks to Nick about making money with his house property. Julia and Preacher discuss Paige and Christopher, leading to a cold turn in their conversation. Joey becomes a talk of the town. Doc and Cameron find Bert and Charlie in the woods, and Charlie is injured. Brady and Jimmy reminisce about the past with Emerald Lumber. Ricky receives his Marine contract and has second thoughts. Jimmy takes a deal, and Mike warns Brady about consequences, overheard by Brie. Lizzie finds pills in Denny's room. Hope, driving without clearance, encounters an issue. Doc hikes to get EMTs as night falls. Mel shares her feelings with Jack, and Mel disrupts Joey's plans.
38	8	"Talk to Me"	Siobhan Devine	Amy Palmer Robertson & Lisa Marie Petersen	July 20, 2022
Charlie starts going into shock, and Doc arrives with EMTs just in time. Mel tries to address the problem she created for Joey. Confronting Jack about his drinking, Mel urges him to talk to someone and he offers to stop drinking. Denny discovers financial papers under a bed, raising suspicions. Lizzie talks to Connie about Denny's pills, and Brie uncovers the person who posted bail for Brady. Mike follows up on Jimmy's information. Muriel and Hope create a garden in Lilly's memory. Denny photographs Doc's financial papers. Charmaine, at a dress fitting, continues to provoke Mel as an apology. A bloody knife is found during a bar leak fix, prompting Mike's involvement. Mike instructs Preacher not to tell Jack. Mel provides Joey with something old, blue, and borrowed for her wedding. Doc discovers a financial paper on Denny's bed, revealing questionable motives. Joey's wedding takes place, but Jack is late and reacts strongly to a past photo. Mel becomes worried about Jack's well-being. Lizzie informs Doc about finding Denny's pills. Ricky and Lizzie share a touching moment, and Preacher informs Mel that Jack is missing.
39	9	"Bombshells"	Monika Mitchell	Amy Palmer Robertson	July 20, 2022
Jack is still missing, and the entire town mobilizes in the search. Mel is visibly upset. Brady and Brie discuss the darker aspects of Jack's military past. Hope confides in Doc about missing Lilly. Mel and Jack have a discussion about what's happening with him. Stacie insists on having dinner with Mel. Lizzie and Ricky talk about Denny, while Hope and Tara share tea and discuss Lilly. Doc attempts to reach Denny for a private conversation, and then explains to Mel the challenges veterans face. Brady meets the real owner of Emerald Lumber, the puppeteer behind Calvin. Denny sees Doc, leading to a confrontation about drugs and clinic finances, revealing the truth to Doc. Hope has a difficult vision. Mel has dinner with Stacie, who shares surprising and disturbing news about Mark's mom. Charmaine visits the bar to talk to Jack in a more amicable manner. Jack seeks advice from Preacher's therapist. Preacher surprises Julia by stopping by to discuss Paige. Preacher receives a scared call from Christopher. Jack informs Mel that he is seeing a therapist, acknowledging the awkwardness. Mike and Brie embark on a waterfront sting operation, resulting in a boat explosion.
40	10	"Fire and Rain"	Monika Mitchell	Sue Tenney & Tesia Joy Walker & Natasha M. Hall	July 20, 2022
Charmaine informs Jack that Todd will be out of town during the baby shower and hopes he can assist her. Mel discusses plans with Cassandra, Mark's mom. Brie's mom wants her to host a baby shower for Charmaine. Brady faces another threat from the mysterious woman. Mel meets Cassandra, who admits to the lawsuit. Mike informs Preacher about finding Sally and the reason behind her drugging him. Doc and Bert discuss Shirley's diagnosis while fishing. Lizzie learns why Denny took the drugs. Muriel spends the day with Hope, teaching her backgammon. DNA from the bar's knife points to Vince. Hope confesses her vision to Muriel. Doc receives a disappointing text from Denny. Mel and Brie discuss the overwhelming baby shower plans. Brie gets a disturbing phone call and informs Mel. Ricky sees Lizzie and Denny having lunch and contemplates what could have been. Ricky receives valuable advice from his grandmother. Doc gets a call from his insurance company about Hope's car accident. Charmaine assures Jack that he won't be kept from the twins. Brady comforts Brie. Overwhelmed, Mel confides in Jack, who surprises her with a change of heart about the NIP. Jack sees the therapist again, and Paige returns.
41	11	"Once Again"	Andy Mikita	Sue Tenney & Jackson Sinder & Jackson Rock	July 20, 2022
Paige queries Preacher about Vince and Christopher. Jack has a nightmare about his older brother and breaks down while sharing the story with Mel. Mel and Jack continue discussing Jack's brother. Doc and Hope consult her doctor about her TBI injury. Paige calls Vince, prompting Preacher to go after him. Denny and Lizzie make signs for Ricky's departure. Cameron appears suspicious, and Brady visits Mel to discuss Brie and his rape issues. Mel gives Brady a pamphlet about a rape center to assist Brie. Jack informs Brie that Mel is pregnant. Mel takes Cameron to lunch, and she discovers he knows about her pregnancy. Cameron promises to support her if needed. Hope confides in Doc about her fears, and he reassures her she'll win this battle. Denny is cryptic with Lizzie about their relationship. Hope tells Muriel about Doc's wishes. Cameron expresses care and concern for Mel, but she abruptly stops him. Nick provides Jack with a sizable check, and they start their airstream business. Preacher arrives home, finding Christopher with a note from Paige. Hope agrees to hire an aide. Denny collapses at Hope and Doc's house. A stranger arrives in town looking for Brie. Jack and Mel spend the night at the airstream, where he surprises her with a question.
42	12	"The Long Goodbye"	Andy Mikita	Sue Tenney & Amy Palmer Robertson	July 20, 2022
Mel responds to Jack's question, and she receives paternity test results from the MD, he is the father of the baby girl. Brady struggles to support Brie. Denny learns his test results, and Doc expresses concern about his well-being. Preacher heads to the cabin to find Vince and Paige. Mel shares joyful news with Doc. Cameron resigns with a two-week notice, prompting concern from Mel. Hope asks Lizzie to be her aide, and Lizzie needs time to consider. Ricky bids farewell before leaving for boot camp. Mel discusses Cameron's resignation with him, and he reveals he must leave. Mike brings news for Brady. Ricky says his goodbyes, spending a final moment with Lizzie. While driving Ricky to the bus station, Jack takes a detour, surprising Ricky. The women visit Lydie. Preacher calls Mike for backup at the cabin where Vince and Paige are located. Denny overhears Doc discussing Lizzie's concerns about being Hope's aide, revealing a bombshell. Nick's sister joins Mel, Jack, Nick, and Jo Ellen at dinner, surprising everyone. Jack and Mel leave early due to a text from Charmaine, and the truth about Jack's shooting is revealed. Vince, Paige, and Preacher meet at the cabin. Mel and Jack find Charmaine on the floor, hysterical, sharing a bombshell, Jack is not the father of the twins.

=== Season 5 (2023) ===
No. overall	No. in season	Title	Directed by	Written by	Original release date
Part 1
43	1	"A Second Chance"	Monika Mitchell	Patrick Sean Smith	September 7, 2023
Starting up immediately after the end of the previous season, Lizzie begins to work as Hope's health aid. Mel talks to Doc about keeping Cameron while allowing her to quit so she could focus on her high risk pregnancy. Tara's sister Ava comes to town as Mel decides to join the sewing circle. Paige decides to leave town now that she is free. Brady is told that the new boss, Melissa Montgomery, wants to sell fentanyl out of Emerald Lumber and recycle the drug money through Jack and Nick's airstream business. Hope has Lizzie help her work on town council agenda before the meeting where she learns that she wasn't needed and that they plan to vote her out. Mel and Ava sit together to talk when Ava collapses.
44	2	"Songbird"	Monika Mitchell	Jackson Sinder	September 7, 2023
Jack speaks with Charmaine as he is upset about her lies. Mel begins to reminisce about her mother as she speaks with Ava after Ava's health scare. Hope tries to keep her position as Mayor after learning that the town council wanted to replace her. Cameron isn't happy with more work at the practice from Doc so Muriel offers to help him out. Brie reveals to Jack about her being a rape survivor and how Brady has been there for her. Jack agrees to give Brady a second chance, unknowing that Brady is selling drugs out of Emerald Lumber. Brady is told that he has to be there for a shipment but upon learning of his dinner plans, his friend Jeb offers to take it over for him. Hope is voted out by everyone but Muriel. Brady returns to work to find Jeb dead.
45	3	"Calculated Risk"	Felipe Rodriguez	Talia Gonzalez	September 7, 2023
Jack has a nightmare about his past and discusses it with his therapist, who advises taking a calculated risk. He goes rock climbing with Denny, triggering flashbacks of his brother's death. Brie prepares for her rape case meeting with an attorney, while Brady lies about his relationship with Jeb and attends his funeral. Cameron bumps into Mel during a run, creating awkwardness. A wildfire prompts Lizzie to suggest bringing food to first responders. Her mom visits, revealing that her parents got her into college. Doc, experiencing eyesight issues, lies to Muriel, who suggests taking the day off. Cameron seeks Muriel's advice and receives a call to help a firefighter, Kaia, deliver a baby; Mel assists over FaceTime. Hope learns her car accident details were shared. Hope credits Lizzie for the news interview. Denny discloses his diagnosis to Jack. Preacher and Kaia flirt, and Brie discovers Brady's lies from Jeb's wife. Lizzie faces potential disapproval from her mother if she doesn't attend college.
46	4	"Never Gonna Be the Same"	Felipe Rodriguez	Tesia Joy Walker	September 7, 2023
Preacher starts dating Kaia to later discover she's married. Brady asks Mike to become a CI.
47	5	"Trial By Fire"	Martin Wood	Erin Cardillo & Richard Keith	September 7, 2023
The fire reaches Virgin River, Doc discovers his eyesight is worsening, Brie makes her emotional testimony at the rape trial in Sacramento and accidentally meets Mike. Mel's pregnancy might be at risk. Lizzie and Denny are trapped by the fire but saved by Bert. Brady and Jack save Hazel who lives in the camps with her mother Lark. Mel saves Ava and Chloe from Lilly's house in the fire with Jack's help; the horses are saved but the house is destroyed. Hope, with the help of Jack, convinces Charlie to use his airplane to pull water to Virgin River, saving the majority of the houses.
48	6	"Heroes Rise"	Martin Wood	Thomas Ian Griffith & Mary Page Keller	September 7, 2023
Doc and Cameron save a firefighter injured while fighting the fire. Mel brings Chloe to the clinic to check her oxygen level. Brady leads the team to delay the fire. Mel discloses the miscarriage to Jack. Nick asks the city council to reinstate Hope as Mayor.
49	7	"From the Ashes"	Jem Garrard	Talia Gonzalez and Erin Cardillo & Richard Keith	September 7, 2023
The entire community of Virgin River tries to rebuild what is lost. Tara and Chloe leave the city as Tara received a job offer in San Francisco. Lizzie tells her mother that she won't attend college, and Hope, as Virgin River's Mayor, asks Lizzie to be her Chief of Staff. Cameron accepts Doc's offer to lead the clinic. Denny is looking for a job as well to stay close to Lizzie. Brady is working with Mike to block Melissa Montgomery, Nick's sister, from recycling drug money through Jack's airstream business.
50	8	"Full Moon"	Jem Garrard	John Lowe	September 7, 2023
Brady and Mike have a discussion about Mike's supporting Brie in Sacramento. Brie breaks up with Brady. Mel decides not to try another pregnancy. Hope and Doc agree to meet Rose, Denny's grandmother.
51	9	"Angel's Peak"	Andy Mikita	Ildiko Susany	September 7, 2023
52	10	"Labor Day"	Andy Mikita	Jackson Sinder & Tesia Joy Walker	September 7, 2023
Part 2
53	11	"The More the Merrier"	Gail Harvey	Erin Cardillo & Richard Keith	November 30, 2023
54	12	"Father Christmas"	Gail Harvey	Erin Cardillo & Richard Keith	November 30, 2023

=== Season 6 (2024) ===
No. overall	No. in season	Title	Directed by	Written by	Original release date
55	1	"Hope Springs Eternal"	Martin Wood	Patrick Sean Smith	December 19, 2024
Jack and Mel are preparing for their wedding which hits some dress complications. The whole town is worried about Preacher's upcoming murder trial while he is distracting himself by helping Jack to finish the new Farm for the wedding. Mel gets to know her father, who is still not ready to speak about his time with her mother. After a health scare he slowly opens up. Hope finds Sugar, one of Lilly's horses, which got lost and wounded in the fire and asks Jack to shelter it in his new barn. Brady celebrates the insurance money with Lark, while still being in the dark about Lark's and Jimmy's relationship and plans to get that money. Jack is called as a surprise witness against Preacher.
56	2	"The Broken Places"	Martin Wood	Jackson Sinder	December 19, 2024
In the 70's, Everett meets Mel's mother while she is hitchhiking to a protest. After some car trouble they get stranded in Virgin River. They spend the night together and, as they separate later at the protest, Sarah leaves it up to fate if they see each other again. Jack gets called in for a witness statement and they get surprised with the voicemail from the night of the murder implicating Preach. Afterwards Preacher is offered a plea deal which he refuses to take. Hope calls Doc for help as Sugar's injury gets worse, reminiscing that he is the only thing left from Lilly. The sewing circle is setting Muriel up for a new man and Lark is putting her plans in motion to get the insurance money from Brady.
57	3	"The Jury's Out"	Rama Rau	Erin Cardillo & Richard Keith	December 19, 2024
Hope plans a big wedding for the whole town. Preacher takes the stand and tells the truth about the night in question. After a passionate speech by Brie, the Jury is unable to reach a verdict, so he is only charged with a misdemeanor for burying the body. Everett continues to tell the story of him and Sarah and how Mel came to be. Mel decides to ask him to walk her down the aisle but has to break it to Doc. Muriel has a health scare, just as Denny is starting his internship in the clinic. They get called for an emergency, where Brady saves a boy from a sinkhole. Ricky comes home for a surprise visit. Jack helps him through his fear before his deployment, after Ricky tries to cope with alcohol. Brady offers money to help Lark's mother but later gets suspicious as he is told she is all well and healthy. Charmaine gets sole custody of her twins after Calvin does not back off.
58	4	"Brothers & Sisters"	Rama Rau	Ildiko Susany	December 19, 2024
59	5	"Love Story"	Felipe Rodriguez	Thomas Ian Griffith & Mary Page Keller	December 19, 2024
60	6	"Ghosts"	Felipe Rodriguez	Tesia Joy Walker	December 19, 2024
61	7	"I Climbed a Mountain and I Turned Around"	Martin Wood	Becky Hartman Edwards	December 19, 2024
62	8	"Going Overboard"	Martin Henderson	Erin Cardillo & Richard Keith	December 19, 2024
63	9	"Prelude to a Kiss"	Monika Mitchell	Erin Cardillo & Richard Keith	December 19, 2024
64	10	"The Big Day"	Monika Mitchell	Patrick Sean Smith	December 19, 2024

=== Season 7 (2026) ===
No. overall	No. in season	Title	Directed by	Written by	Original release date
65	1	"The Afterglow"	Andy Mikita	Erin Cardillo & Richard Keith	March 12, 2026
66	2	"Beautiful Child"	Andy Mikita	Tesia Joy Walker	March 12, 2026
67	3	"The Match"	Audrey Cummings	Thomas Ian Griffith & Mary Page Keller	March 12, 2026
68	4	"Pipe Dreams"	Audrey Cummings	Ildiko Susany	March 12, 2026
69	5	"Always Anywhere Forever"	Monika Mitchell	Jackson Sinder	March 12, 2026
70	6	"No Regrets"	Monika Mitchell	Rachel Borders	March 12, 2026
71	7	"It Takes A Village"	Ruba Nadda	Becky Hartman Edwards	March 12, 2026
72	8	"Back In The Saddle"	Ruba Nadda	Thomas Ian Griffith & Mary Page Keller	March 12, 2026
73	9	"La Luna De Miel"	Felipe Rodriguez	Erin Cardillo & Richard Keith	March 12, 2026
74	10	"David and Goliath"	Felipe Rodriguez	Patrick Sean Smith	March 12, 2026

== Production ==
=== Development ===
On September 27, 2018, it was announced that Netflix had given the production a series order for a first season consisting of ten episodes. The series was based on the Virgin River book series by Robyn Carr with executive producers: Sue Tenney, Roma Roth, and Chris Perry. Tenney was also set to serve as the series' showrunner with Reel World Management acting as the Production company involved in the series. On December 20, 2019, Netflix renewed the series for a 10-episode second season. On December 18, 2020, Netflix renewed the series for a 10-episode third season. On September 20, 2021, Netflix renewed the series for a 12-episode fourth and fifth season. On July 26, 2022, it was reported that Patrick Sean Smith replaced Sue Tenney as showrunner. On May 17, 2023, ahead of the fifth-season premiere, Netflix renewed the series for a sixth season. On October 23, 2024, ahead of the sixth season premiere, Netflix renewed the series for a 10-episode seventh season. It was also reported to be Netflix's longest-running English-language drama series and longest-running current original scripted series. On July 10, 2025, ahead of the seventh season premiere, Netflix renewed the series for an eighth season. On November 13, 2026, ahead of the eighth season premiere, Netflix renewed the series for a ninth season.

=== Casting ===
On December 19, 2018, it was reported that Alexandra Breckenridge, Martin Henderson, Tim Matheson, and Annette O'Toole had been cast in series regular roles. Additionally, it was further reported that Jenny Cooper, David Cubitt, Lexa Doig, Daniel Gillies, Lauren Hammersley, Benjamin Hollingsworth, Colin Lawrence, Trevor Lerner, and Ian Tracey had joined the cast in an undisclosed capacity. On May 29, 2020, Sarah Dugdale joined the second season as a series regular while Grayson Gurnsey has been promoted as a series regular for the second season. On June 11, 2020, Benjamin Hollingsworth was promoted to a series regular for the second season. Upon the third season renewal announcement, Zibby Allen was cast a new series regular and Stacey Farber was cast in a recurring role. On October 25, 2021, Mark Ghanimé and Kai Bradbury joined cast as new series regulars for the fourth season. On September 23, 2024, Jessica Rothe and Callum Kerr were cast in recurring capacities for the sixth season. On December 19, 2024, Smith confirmed that Ghanimé is not returning as a series regular for the seventh season. On March 13, 2025, Sara Canning and Cody Kearsley joined the cast in recurring roles for the seventh season. On July 14, 2025, Austin Nichols was cast in an undisclosed role for the seventh season. On March 12, 2026, it was reported that Marco Grazzini and Lauren Hammersley exited the series after the seventh season. In May 2026, Mitchell Slaggert and Natasha Calis were cast in recurring roles for the eighth season.

=== Filming ===
Principal photography for the series' first season commenced on December 3, 2018, in Vancouver, British Columbia and Saltspring Island, BC and ended on March 26, 2019. The series was also filmed on location in Snug Cove, Bowen Island, New Westminster, Squamish, Agassiz, and Port Coquitlam, British Columbia. Filming for the second season began on September 9, 2019, and ended on December 17, 2019. Filming for the fourth season ended on December 7, 2021. Filming for the fifth season began on July 18 and concluded on November 21, 2022. Filming for the sixth season began on February 22, 2024 and concluded on May 31, 2024. Filming for the seventh season began on March 12, 2025 and concluded on June 20, 2025. The eighth season began filming on April 22, 2026 and scheduled end in August.

The community of Virgin River is actually Snug Cove, Bowen Island "with establishing shots including the local library, main streets and Artisan Lane", according to one report. The Watershed Grill, in Brackendale, British Columbia stands in for Jack's Grill; some of the scenes involving Melinda and Jack were filmed in Squamish, near the river. The waterfalls in the show is in the Shannon Falls Provincial Park. Some scenes were filmed in Burnaby at Fraser Foreshore Park and at Port Coquitlam, both near Vancouver. The cabin in the series is the caretaker's house in Murdo Frazer Park, in North Vancouver; this site has been used by other productions as well. Doc Mullins' practice is a Victorian home in New Westminster.

== Release ==
The first season premiered on December 6, 2019. The second season premiered on November 27, 2020. The third season was released on July 9, 2021. The fourth season premiered on July 20, 2022. The fifth season premiered on September 7, 2023. The sixth season was released on December 19, 2024. The seventh season was released on March 12, 2026.

== Reception ==
=== Critical response ===
On the review aggregation website Rotten Tomatoes, the second season holds an approval rating of 90% with an average rating of 6.3/10, based on 10 critic ratings. The website's critics consensus reads, "Gentle as a babbling brook—and just as exciting, for better or worse—Virgin River's sophomore season offers up more of the comfort viewing that fans have come to crave." On Rotten Tomatoes, the third season has an approval rating of 56%, based on 9 critic ratings, with an average rating of 6/10. The fourth season holds a 100% approval rating on Rotten Tomatoes, based on 7 critic reviews, with an average rating of 7/10. On Rotten Tomatoes, the fifth season has an 80% approval rating on Rotten Tomatoes, based on 5 critic reviews, with an average rating of 6.3/10.

=== Accolades ===
Award	Year	Category	Recipients	Episode	Result	Ref.
The ReFrame Stamp	2023	TV			Won	
The ReFrame Stamp	2022	IMDbPro Top 200 Most Popular TV Titles 2021-2022			Won	
The ReFrame Stamp	2021	IMDbPro Top 200 Most Popular TV Titles 2020-2021			Won	
Leo Awards	2022	Best Picture Editing in a Dramatic Series	Daria Ellerman	"Where There's Smoke"	Won	
Leo Awards	2021	Best Lead Performance by a Male in a Dramatic Series	Colin Lawrence	"Taken By Surprise"	Won	
Leo Awards	2021	Best Picture Editing in a Dramatic Series	Nicole Ratcliffe	"Rumour Has It"	Nominated	
Leo Awards	2020	Best Picture Editing in a Dramatic Series	Daria Ellerman	"Carry On"	Won	
Leo Awards	2020	Best Picture Editing in a Dramatic Series	Lara Mazur	"Under Fire"	Nominated	

== Prequel ==
On February 22, 2024, it was announced that a prequel about Mel's parents, Sarah and Everett, is in development. As of March 2026, the series was still in development, having undergone some reworking to no longer focus on Mel's parents.
