= Andrea Menard =

Canadian actress

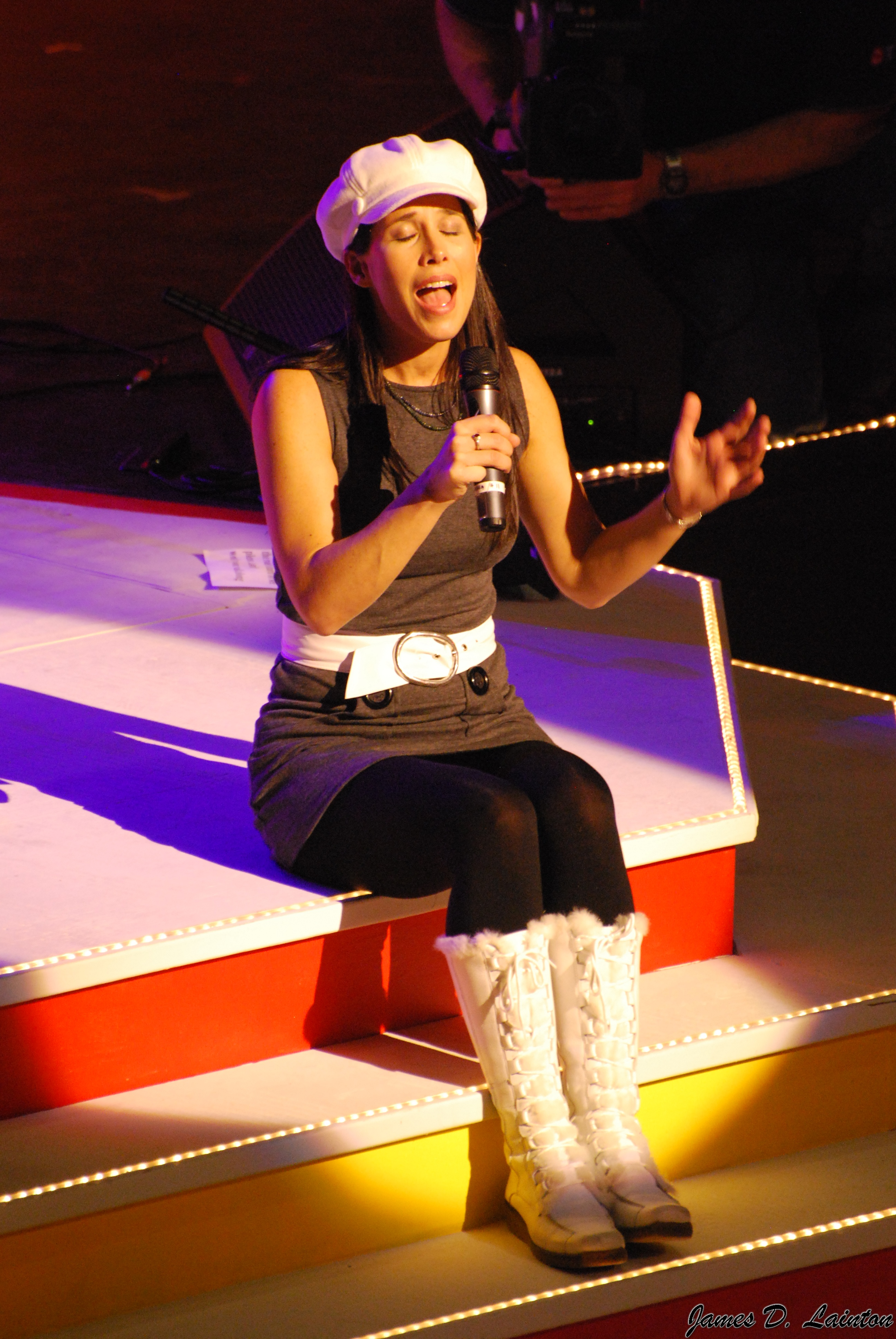
- Photo by James Lainton
- Born: Flin Flon, Manitoba, Canada
- Occupations: Actress, playwright, jazz singer
- Years active: 2000–present

Andrea Menard (born 15 January 1971) is a Canadian actress, playwright, and jazz singer.

== Early life ==
Menard was born in Flin Flon, Manitoba and based in Saskatchewan.

== Career ==
Menard, who is of Métis descent, is best known for her work on the television series Moccasin Flats (2003) (in which she played a police officer with the Regina Police Service) and for her starring role as Constable Tara Wheaton in the television series Rabbit Fall (2007–2008). She was the voice of characters Sarah Merasty and Kohkum on the APTN stop motion animated program Wapos Bay: The Series (2005–2010). Since 2023, she has appeared as a series regular in the CTV series, Sullivan's Crossing.

An accomplished jazz singer, Menard wrote and composed a one-woman, musical one act play entitled The Velvet Devil, which opened to rave reviews in 1998. A soundtrack album featuring 18 songs was released in 2002 and the CBC made a film based upon the play which aired in Canada in April 2006. In 2005, Menard was featured on the compilation album Real Divas - Torch Light Vol. II along with 15 other Canadian jazz vocalists. Menard's music has been used in a number of TV shows internationally, most notably her tongue-in-cheek ode to gender politics, "If I Were a Man", which was featured on an episode of the series Queer as Folk.

In May 2005, Menard was one of the headliners of a special command performance for Queen Elizabeth II to mark the 100th anniversary of Saskatchewan becoming a province of Canada.

Menard's second CD, Simple Steps, was released on December 3, 2005. Her third album, a collection of Christmas/winter songs, entitled Sparkle, was released in 2008.

Menard has written two books, Seeds from the Sacred Feminine (2023), a "wisdom deck" of cards with handbook (illustrated by Leah Dorion) and Reflections on Allyship (2023), co-written with Marc Bhalla.

== Filmography ==
- Skipped Parts (2000) - Dot
- The Impossible Elephant (2001) - Miss Parker
- Betrayed (2003) - Liane
- The Pedestrian (2003) - Laura
- I Accuse (2003) - Heather
- Prairie Giant: The Tommy Douglas Story (2006) - Lead Reporter
- Rabbit Fall (TV movie) (2006) - Tara
- Moccasin Flats (2003–2006) - Detective Amanda Strongeagle
- The Velvet Devil (2006) - Velvet Laurent
- Redemption SK (2007) - Riley
- Juliana and the Medicine Fish (2007) - Maggie Saunders
- Renegadepress.com (2004–2008) - Joanne
- Rabbit Fall (2007–2008) - Officer Tara Wheaton
- Little Mosque on the Prairie (2009) - Helen
- A Windigo Tale (2010) - Lili
- In Redemption (2010) - Ryley
- Wapos Bay: The Series (2005–2010) - Sarah/Kohkum/Woman of the Woods
- Sparkle (2010)
- Blackstone (2011) - Debbie Fraser
- Hard Rock Medical (2013) - Eva Malone
- Two 4 One (2014) - Julia
- Arctic Air (2014) - Rebecca Morlin
- The Switch (2015) - Sandra
- Unser Traum von Kanada - Alles auf Anfang (German TV, 2016)
- Unser Traum von Kanada - Sowas wie Familie (German TV, 2016)
- Supernatural (2017) - Sheriff Christine Barker
- Tribal (2020) - Teresa
- Sullivan's Crossing (2023–present) - Edna Cranebear
- The Great Salish Heist (2024) - Joanne
