= Robyn Carr =

American author

- Occupations: Novelist; short story writer; nonfiction writer
- Writing career
- Period: 1980–present
- Genre: Romance
- Subject: writing tips
- Notable work: By Right of Arms
- Notable awards: Golden Medallion – Historical Romance; 1987 By Right of Arms; RWA Nora Roberts Lifetime Achievement Award; 2016
- Website: www.robyncarr.com

Robyn Carr is an American author. She is the writer of the Virgin River series of books and has written more than fifty novels. Her novels have been on The New York Times Best Seller list, including titles such as The Hero.

She is also an executive producer on the television adaptations of Virgin River and Sullivan's Crossing.

== Biography ==
Carr studied nursing in college. She married her high school sweetheart just before he left for the US Air Force as a helicopter pilot during the Vietnam War. Carr followed her new husband from base to base, and because they did not stay in any one place for very long, she was unable to pursue her nursing career. When a difficult pregnancy required her to be off her feet, Carr turned to romance novels to distract herself. She soon decided to write her own novels.

Carr has since published dozens of historical and contemporary romance novels, a suspense novel, a non-fiction work, short stories, articles, and even wrote several screenplays which have yet to be sold. Carr also hosts monthly "Carr Chats" at the Paseo Verde Library in Henderson, Nevada, where she interviews other authors.

In addition to Virgin River, her Sullivan's Crossing novel series has also been adapted into the television drama series Sullivan's Crossing, which premiered in 2023.

Carr has a son and a daughter.

== Published works ==
=== Stand-alone novels ===
- Chelynne (1980)
- Blue Falcon (1981)
- Bellerose Bar (1982)
- Braeswood Tapestry (1985)
- The Troubadour's Romance (1985)
- By Right of Arms (1986)
- The Bellerose Bargain (1986)
- The Everlasting Covenant (1987)
- Tempted (1987)
- Rogue's Lady (1988)
- Informed Risk (1989)
- Woman's Own (1990)
- Backward Glance (1991)
- The Armstrong Women (1990)
- Mind Tryst (1992)
- The House on Olive Street (2000)
- The Wedding Party (2002)
- Blue Skies (2004)
- Runaway Mistress (2005)
- Never Too Late (2006)
- Four Friends (2014)
- Swept Away (2016) [Originally Published as 'Runaway Mistress']
- The Life She Wants (2016)
- The Summer That Made Us (2017)
- A Summer in Sonoma (2018)
- The Garden Party (2019)
- The View from Alameda Island (April 30, 2019)
- Sunrise on Half Moon Bay 2020
- A Family Affair (2022)

=== Grace Valley ===
1. Deep in the Valley (2001)
2. Just Over the Mountain (2002)
3. Down by the River (2003)

=== Virgin River ===
1. Virgin River (2007)
2. Shelter Mountain (2007)
3. Whispering Rock (2007)
4. A Virgin River Christmas (2008)
5. Second Chance Pass (2009)
6. Temptation Ridge (2009)
7. Paradise Valley (2009)
8. Under the Christmas Tree (In the anthology That Holiday Feeling) (2009)
9. Forbidden Falls (2010)
10. Angel's Peak (2010)
11. Moonlight Road (2010)
12. Sheltering Hearts (2010) [A Virgin River novella]
13. Midnight Confessions (In the anthology Midnight Kiss) (2010)
14. Promise Canyon (2011)
15. Wild Man Creek (2011)
16. Harvest Moon (2011)
17. Bring Me Home for Christmas (2011)
18. Hidden Summit (2012)
19. Redwood Bend (2012)
20. Sunrise Point (2012)
21. My Kind of Christmas (2012)
22. Return to Virgin River (2020)

=== Thunder Point ===
1. The Wanderer (2013)
2. The Newcomer (2013)
3. The Hero (2013)
4. The Chance (2014)
5. The Promise (2014)
6. The Homecoming (2014)
7. One Wish (2015)
8. A New Hope (2015)
9. Wildest Dreams (2015)

=== Sullivan's Crossing ===
1. What We Find (2016)
2. Any Day Now (2017)
3. The Family Gathering (2018)
4. The Best of Us (January 8, 2019)
5. The Country Guesthouse (2020)

=== Omnibus ===
- To Mother with Love: Way Home / Backward Glance / So This Is Love (1993) (with Linda Howard and Cheryl Reavis)
- That Holiday Feeling: Silver Bells / The Perfect Holiday / Under the Christmas Tree (2009) (with Debbie Macomber and Sherryl Woods)
- Midnight Kiss: Midnight Confessions / Midnight Surrender / Midnight Assignment (2010) (with Jean Brashear and Victoria Dahl)
- 'Tis the Season: Under the Christmas Tree / Midnight Confessions (2014)
- Home to You: Virgin River / When Lightning Strikes (2017) (with Brenda Novak)
- All I Want for Christmas: A Virgin River Christmas / Under the Christmas Tree (2018)

=== Non-fiction ===
- Practical Tips for Writing Popular Fiction (1993)

=== Anthologies containing stories by Robyn Carr ===
- David Copperfield's Beyond Imagination (1996)

=== Short stories ===
- "Natasha's Bedroom" (1996)

== Awards and reception ==
Awards for Robyn Carr
Year	Nominated work	Category	Award	Result	Notes	Ref.
1987	By Right of Arms	Historical Romance	Romance Writers of America Golden Medallion	Won		
2016			RWA Nora Roberts Lifetime Achievement Award	Won		
