= Sullivan's Crossing =

2023 Canadian romantic drama series

- Genre: Romantic drama Medical drama
- Created by: Roma Roth
- Based on: Sullivan's Crossing by Robyn Carr
- Starring: Morgan Kohan; Chad Michael Murray; Tom Jackson; Andrea Menard; Scott Patterson
- Music by: Ari Posner; Joel Schwartz; Amin Bhatia
- Opening theme: "Time and Time Again" by WILD
- Country of origin: Canada
- Original language: English
- No. of seasons: 4
- No. of episodes: 40

Production
- Executive producers: Hilary Martin; Michela DiMondo; Robyn Carr; Christopher E. Perry; Roma Roth; Floyd Kane
- Producers: Mark Gingras; Michael Volpe; Ann Bernier; Marc Tetreault; Jason Levangie
- Production location: Halifax, Nova Scotia
- Production companies: Reel World Management; Fremantle; Bell Media; Canada Media Fund; Bell Fund

Original release
- Network: CTV
- Release: March 19, 2023 – present
- Network: The CW
- Release: October 4, 2023 – present

Sullivan's Crossing is a Canadian romantic drama television series, which premiered on March 19, 2023, on CTV. Since the second season, it has been co-produced by The CW which broadcasts it in the United States. In June 2026, the series was renewed for a fifth season.

== Premise ==
Based on the novel series by Robyn Carr, the series follows neurosurgeon Maggie Sullivan who finds herself in legal trouble and returns to her hometown in rural Nova Scotia to reconnect with her estranged father, Sully.

== Cast and characters ==
=== Main ===
- Morgan Kohan as Maggie Sullivan
- Chad Michael Murray as California 'Cal' Jones
- Tom Jackson as Frank Cranebear
- Andrea Menard as Edna Cranebear
- Scott Patterson as Harry 'Sully' Sullivan (seasons 1–3)

=== Recurring ===
- Lynda Boyd as Phoebe Lancaster
- Allan Hawco as Andrew Eric Mathews
- Dakota Taylor as Rafe Vadas
- Amalia Williamson as Lola Gunderson
- Peter Outerbridge as Walter Lancaster
- Lauren Hammersley as Connie Boyle
- Reid Price as Rob Shandon
- Lindura Sappong as Sydney Shandon
- Zayn Maloney as Finn Shandon
- Richard Donat as Roy Gunderson
- Calem MacDonald as Kaleb Meyer
- T. Thomason as Jackson Canaday
- Hugh Thompson as Tom Canaday
- Kate Vernon as Helen Culver
- Steve Lund as Cooper
- John Ralston as Jed Jones
- Joel Oulette as Jacob
- Marcus Rosner as Liam
- Jonathan Silverman as Dr. Quincy Carlson (Season 4)

== Episodes ==
=== Series overview ===
Season	Episodes	Originally released	
Season	Episodes	First released	Last released
1	10	March 19, 2023	May 14, 2023
2	10	April 14, 2024	June 9, 2024
3	10	April 27, 2025	June 22, 2025
4	10	March 22, 2026	May 31, 2026

=== Season 1 (2023) ===
No. overall	No. in season	Title	Directed by	Written by	Original release date
1	1	"Coming Home"	Bradley Walsh	Roma Roth & Kerri MacDonald	March 19, 2023
Maggie Sullivan, a neurosurgeon living in Boston, has some legal trouble; her boss has been indicted for billing fraud and she is being sued for negligence. She decides to go home to her rural hometown of Timberlake, Nova Scotia. Although most of the people there are generally friendly and welcoming, she is stand-offish and her father Sully, who runs a summer camp resort called Sullivan's Crossing, thinks she does not really need him and is wary about how long she will stay.
2	2	"Homewrecker"	Gail Harvey	Adam Pettle	March 26, 2023
Maggie is going over her medical files to figure out if or what she did wrong with her negligence case. Sully says it is not about her, it is about a mother losing her child. Later, Sully looks through old photo albums of Maggie and it is revealed that he is a recovering alcoholic. The elderly Roy, who suffers from dementia, has a fall and Maggie provides first aid. Later that day, Maggie and Sidney are having a few drinks and sing karaoke. Maggie has a beer with Cal after Sidney leaves with a fire fighter and since Maggie is a little drunk, Cal walks her home. When she arrives home, her boyfriend Andrew is waiting for her. He apologises for what he said before she left Boston and they make up.
3	3	"Detours"	T.W. Peacocke	Kerri MacDonald	April 2, 2023
Andrew wants Maggie to come back to Boston with him but she refuses. Andrew is jealous of Cal because he walked Maggie home. Later that day, Sully's camp site celebrates the season opening with food, music and games and by conducting a ceremony to honour the Mi'kmaq people of the native land. A 16-year-old girl, Chelsea, goes missing and the whole town comes together for the search. Frank comes across two college boys, who are visiting the area, drinking and illegally doing target practise in the woods. They have Chelsea with them. Frank tries to get them to leave but then one of the boy's guns goes off and shoots Frank. Chelsea wants to call 911 but the boys are too scared and they run off with the girl.
4	4	"Rock and a Hard Place"	T.W. Peacocke	John Callaghan & T'áncháy Redvers	April 9, 2023
Some of the townspeople start worrying about Frank's absence so Sully, Cal and Maggie go in search of him. Maggie and Cal find him in the woods and Franks tells them he was accidentally shot by one of the college guys from the campsite. Maggie and Cal find the boys and are able to free Chelsea who is being held in their cabin. Meanwhile, Sully has a meeting with his bank asking for another extension on his loan but is told that he has to pay or go into foreclosure by the end of next month. Cal and Maggie are going fishing and he invites her to cook her catch for dinner. Lola admits to Sully that she is overwhelmed with having to care for Roy, and Sully gives her a cheque to make alteration at home and get home care for her grandfather.
5	5	"Pressure Drop"	Gail Harvey	John Callaghan	April 16, 2023
Maggie goes to the diner, where Syd says she has ended her relationship with Rafe and that Finn got kicked out of his baseball tournament for fighting. Frank returns from the hospital. Jackson reads Sully a news article that questions the safety of Sullivan's Crossing, mentioning that this may be the reason people canceled their reservations. Cal helps Maggie prepare for her deposition and mentions his wife, Lynne, which catches Maggie off guard. Maggie tells Rob about Finn's fight, leaving Rob angry at Syd. Walter arrives at the campground unannounced, and he reassures Maggie about the upcoming trial. Sully fails to get another loan to save the family land, so he goes to a bar and almost breaks his vow of sobriety. Cal tells Maggie that his wife died of ALS. Sully confronts Walter. Walter admits that he convinced Phoebe to keep Maggie away when she was young, and Sully breaks Walter's nose. When Walter leaves for Boston, Maggie goes with him. Afterwards, Sully takes a shot of tequila.
6	6	"Boiling Point"	Bradley Walsh	Kerri MacDonald	April 23, 2023
At lunch with Phoebe and Andrew, Maggie learns Andrew has accepted the job in Boston. At Sullivan's Crossing, Cal and Roy discuss Maggie and Lola over a game of chess. Edna confronts Sully about the fight with Walter. Cal has dinner with Roy and Lola. In Boston, Andrew takes Maggie out to celebrate his new job. While she is in the bathroom, he reads and deletes a text from Cal on her phone. Maggie later runs into her old boss and tells him she never wants to hear from him again. Maggie calls Cal before her deposition and tells him she never got his text. During a break in the deposition, the patient's mother confronts Maggie. Meanwhile more campers cancel reservations at Sullivan's Crossing. Maggie calls Sully to tell him the case is going to trial and ends the call angry. Sully drinks again and paints over Maggie's mural, thinking she is never coming back. Andrew proposes to Maggie, but they are interrupted by a phone call before she can answer. Maggie tells him she has to go back to Sullivan's Crossing.
7	7	"Second Chances"	Gail Harvey	Kerri MacDonald & Dee Raffo & Roma Roth	April 30, 2023
Maggie returns to Sullivan's Crossing for Roy's funeral. Finn fights with another kid, and Rob expresses concern over his behavior. Lola accuses Maggie of hurting Sully every time she comes back. Cal has a flashback to his wife's death, in which she encourages him to move on with his life after she passes. At the diner, Rob talks with Finn, and Rafe stops in to ask Syd why she is avoiding him. Rob gives him advice. Lola brings Cal Roy's chess set. They talk about her childhood accident when she was the victim of a hit and run. Edna and Frank plan a vacation to visit family. Maggie takes Andrew to her favorite spot from her childhood. He says he wants to start a family, but she hesitates. Frank asks Sully to go to an AA meeting, but Sully declines. At the bar later, Andrew picks a fight with Cal, and he admits he deleted Cal's texts to Maggie. He punches Cal and breaks up with Maggie. Maggie goes home to Sully's but flees when she sees he has painted over their mural.
8	8	"Aftershock"	Gail Harvey	Roma Roth	May 7, 2023
Sully agrees to give Frank a ride to an AA meeting. Syd visits Maggie, and they discuss why she only came back to the camp once as a teen, as well as the breakup. Frank expresses some concerns about leaving Sully alone when he and Edna go on vacation. Maggie checks on Cal, and they talk about the breakup and the upcoming trial. Rafe stops by the diner, and Rob urges Syd to ask Rafe out. The two go out on a date, but she gets uncomfortable when he brings up her past modeling career. Cal takes Maggie into the forest to relax. While there, she has a flashback to the day her mother took her from Sully, but Cal reassures her. They connect over their past trauma. Kaleb gets sick on the way to a rock climb, but Jackson gets Cal and Maggie for help. Kaleb says Jackson should tell Tom, his father, about his dreams to be an architect. Frank and Edna tell Sully they are leaving on vacation but Jackson and Maggie will stay to help. Cal takes Maggie on a picnic to her favorite spot. Maggie kisses Cal but regrets it. Back at home, Maggie and Sully argue about the past.
9	9	"Can't Help Falling"	Jerry Ciccoritti	John Callaghan	May 14, 2023
Maggie and Syd chat about Cal and Rafe. Lola tries to return Sully's check, but he insists she keep it. She offers to help out at the camp store instead. Maggie apologizes to Lola for misunderstanding her mother's relationship with Sully. Jackson and Kaleb almost kiss on a rock climb, but then Jackson takes a fall and sustains a serious head injury. Kaleb runs for help. Cal helps Maggie try and save Jackson until the rescue crew arrives. At the diner, Syd advises Rob to spend more time with Finn. Rob interviews people for an assistant manager position, and Syd gets angry that he did not discuss it with her first. Jackson's surgery is successful. Back at camp, Maggie and Sully make peace. Sully calls Phoebe to say that Maggie belongs in Boston where she can make a difference. Maggie's lawyer calls to say the trial date has been moved up. Sully gets a foreclosure letter for Sullivan's Crossing.
10	10	"Sins of the Father"	Jerry Ciccoritti	Roma Roth	May 14, 2023
Sully considers taking out a second mortgage. When Rob hires an assistant manager, Syd quits and moves out of Rob's house because she feels unwanted. Kaleb visits the hospital to tell Jackson goodbye. They part with a kiss. Syd moves in with Rafe, insisting it is temporary and that they are not a couple. In Boston, the trial begins, but Maggie speaks to Mrs. Markiff in private. Maggie decides to admit her wrongdoings, and risks losing her licence. But, after the judge implies she will suffer the consequences, Mrs. Markiff admits she has asked the court to dismiss the suit. After the trial, Andrew apologizes to Maggie. She is offered a job at a Boston hospital. Maggie's old boss catches up to her and implies Walter has been involved in illegal activity. Maggie returns to Sullivan's Crossing to consider her future. Cal remembers the day his wife passed away, then spreads her ashes in the ocean. He leaves a note for Maggie before checking out of the cabin, but Lola takes it before Maggie arrives. Back at Sully's house, Maggie takes a pregnancy test. It is positive. She decides to take the job in Boston and asks Sully why he never came after her when Phoebe left him. He does not answer, and she leaves. During a flashback, Sully recalls speeding after Phoebe and Maggie in his truck. He loses control and hits Lola, who was riding her bike, revealing that he was responsible for her childhood accident and that this is why he never came for Maggie. His heart races, and he loses consciousness. Maggie pauses at the gates of Sullivan's Crossing before driving away.

=== Season 2 (2024) ===
No. overall	No. in season	Title	Directed by	Written by	Original release date
11	1	"Guilt Trip"	Chris Grismer	Roma Roth	April 14, 2024
12	2	"A Storm Is Brewing"	Chris Grismer	Leila Basen	April 21, 2024
13	3	"Confessions"	Cal Coons	Mika Collins	April 28, 2024
14	4	"Eye of the Storm"	Cal Coons	Shelley Scarrow	May 5, 2024
15	5	"Secrets"	Melanie Orr	Rosana Roth	May 12, 2024
16	6	"Revelations"	Melanie Orr	Ryan Atimoyoo & Ken Craw	May 19, 2024
17	7	"Reunions"	April Mullen	Roma Roth	May 26, 2024
18	8	"Truth and Consequences"	April Mullen	John Callaghan	June 2, 2024
19	9	"Remorse"	Shamim Sarif	John Callaghan & Rosana Roth	June 9, 2024
20	10	"It's a Wonderful Life"	Shamim Sarif	Roma Roth	June 9, 2024

=== Season 3 (2025) ===
No. overall	No. in season	Title	Directed by	Written by	Original release date
21	1	"New Beginnings"	Jonathan Wright	Roma Roth	April 27, 2025
22	2	"Out of the Blue"	Jonathan Wright	N.T. Grey & Rosana Roth	May 4, 2025
23	3	"The Ties That Bind"	Chris Grismer	John Callaghan	May 11, 2025
24	4	"A Clear Perspective"	Chris Grismer	Roma Roth	May 18, 2025
25	5	"Misunderstandings"	Martin Wood	Rosana Roth	May 25, 2025
26	6	"Bad Timing"	Martin Wood	John Callaghan	June 1, 2025
27	7	"Twists and Turns"	April Mullen	Priscilla M. White & Mark Bacci	June 8, 2025
28	8	"Blindsided"	April Mullen	John Callaghan & Rosana Roth	June 15, 2025
29	9	"First Cut Is the Deepest"	Winnifred Jong	Roma Roth	June 22, 2025
30	10	"Head to the Heart"	Winnifred Jong	John Callaghan & Josh Granovsky & Rosana Roth	June 22, 2025

=== Season 4 (2026) ===
No. overall	No. in season	Title	Directed by	Written by	Original release date
31	1	"Curveballs"	Michael McGowan	Rachel Langer	March 22, 2026
32	2	"Open Wounds"	Michael McGowan	Rosana Roth	March 29, 2026
33	3	"Northern Lights"	Zoe Leigh Hopkins	Sherry White	April 5, 2026
34	4	"Gut Instincts"	Zoe Leigh Hopkins	Anita Kapila	April 12, 2026
35	5	"Abandoning"	April Mullen	John Callaghan	April 19, 2026
36	6	"Falling Through the Cracks"	April Mullen	Lisa Nasson & Katrina Saville	April 26, 2026
37	7	"Face the Music"	Chris Grismer	Karen Kicak	May 3, 2026
38	8	"Let it Go"	Chris Grismer	Sherry White	May 17, 2026
39	9	"We Can Work It Out"	Michael McGowan	John Callaghan	May 24, 2026
40	10	"Healing Hearts"	Michael McGowan	Rosana Roth	May 31, 2026

== Production ==
=== Development ===
The series was produced by Reel World Management in collaboration with Bell Media and Fremantle. Production on the series started in June 2022 in Nova Scotia.

The show is filmed in multiple locations in Nova Scotia. The most prominent filming locations include Shubie Park in Dartmouth, Nova Scotia, 1901 Beaver Bank Road in Beaver Bank, Nova Scotia, and Agricola Street in North End, Halifax. Also filmed at Fishermans Cove in Eastern Passage. Additionally, many aerial shots of famous coastal locations in the province were used as B-roll including Lawrencetown Beach and Peggy's Cove.

In June 2023, the series was renewed by CTV for a second season, with The CW joining as a co-producer. Filming for the second season wrapped in the fall of 2023.

In June 2024, the series was renewed by CTV for a third season. In December 2024, The CW also renewed the series for a third season as well as returned as a co-producer.

In June 2025, the series was renewed by CTV for a fourth season. In July 2025, The CW also renewed the series for a fourth season.

In June 2026, the series was renewed by CTV for a fifth season. Roma Roth exited the series as showrunner and head writer in July 2026, with Floyd Kane replacing her from the fifth season onwards, though Roth remained in her role of executive producer. The CW also renewed the series for a fifth season in July 2026.

=== Casting ===
The cast also includes Chad Michael Murray as Cal, Sully's assistant at the campground that he runs, as well as Tom Jackson, Andrea Menard, Lynda Boyd, Allan Hawco, Amalia Williamson, Peter Outerbridge, Dakota Taylor and Lauren Hammersley in supporting roles.

== International broadcast ==
In the United States, the series premiered on October 4, 2023, on The CW. The second season premiered on October 2, 2024. The third season premiered on May 14, 2025. The fourth season premiered on April 20, 2026. Netflix licensed the series in Canada and the US in April and July 2025 respectively. In Africa, the series airs on M-Net. Voyo broadcasts the series in the Czech Republic and Slovakia. In Sweden, the first two seasons were released in mid-2024 on TV4. In Australia, the series is released exclusively on Stan. On October 4, 2025, the series premiered on bTV Story and it's available to watch online on VOYO Bulgaria.

== Reception ==
On the review aggregator website Rotten Tomatoes, the first season has an approval rating of 67% based on six critic reviews, with an average rating of 6.8/10.

The first two seasons of the show were consistently ranked as first in key demographics on CTV and its viewership was 51% more than CTV's average prime time viewership. The first season was the highest-rated Canadian drama for the year of 2023, with an average viewership of 947,000 on CTV. The second season averaged 827,000 viewers. In 2025, it was the highest-rated Canadian romantic drama with a viewership of 768,000.

The show also performed well on The CW, averaging more than one million viewers combined on broadcast and streaming platforms. It reached an all-time high viewership on broadcast with the May 28, 2025, episode. It was also the most streamed series on The CW app in June 2025. The broadcast of the first season in the US averaged a viewership of 749,000, while the second season averaged 673,000 viewers and the third season averaged 453,000 viewers.

On Netflix, the first season became the third most watched globally and the most watched in the US, with the second season being ranked seventh in the US. The third season was the second most watched show in the US on Netflix. The fourth season became the third most watched show in the US and the sixth most watched English-language series globally upon its Netflix release.
