= Gilmore Girls season 2 =

Gilmore Girls
- Season 2
- Season 2 DVD cover
- Showrunner: Amy Sherman-Palladino
- Starring: Lauren Graham; Alexis Bledel; Melissa McCarthy; Keiko Agena; Yanic Truesdale; Scott Patterson; Liza Weil; Jared Padalecki; Milo Ventimiglia; Kelly Bishop; Edward Herrmann
- No. of episodes: 22

Release
- Original network: The WB
- Original release: October 9, 2001 – May 21, 2002

Season chronology
- ← Previous; Season 1 Next → Season 3

The second season of Gilmore Girls, an American comedy drama television series, began airing on October 9, 2001, on The WB. The season concluded on May 21, 2002, after 22 episodes. The series was moved from Thursday to Tuesday at 8:00 pm, where it aired for the entire season.

On January 15, 2002, The WB announced that the show was renewed for a third season.

== Overview ==
The season opens with Lorelai trying to decide whether or not to accept Max's proposal. At the end of the first episode, she finally does. However, at the end of the third episode, she calls off the wedding just a couple days before. On a road trip with Rory, Lorelai confesses that she didn't really love Max. Christopher returns with a new girlfriend, Sherry, with whom he seems ready to settle down. Both Lorelai and Emily are disappointed that he was not ready to settle down with Lorelai, but they remain in friendly contact.

Rory spends the season in a relationship with Dean, while Tristin, the main rival for her affections from the first season, is sent away to military school. Luke's nephew, Jess, comes to stay with him after getting into trouble at home in New York City and his interest in Rory is plain. This interest causes many ongoing arguments between Rory and Dean, with Dean heavily disliking Jess from the beginning. Despite this, Rory and Jess start a friendship. Soon after, Jess and Rory are involved in a car accident that destroys the car Dean refurbished for Rory and leaves Rory with a fractured wrist. Despite Rory's protests, the whole town (including Lorelai, Emily, Lane, and Dean) blames Jess for fracturing Rory's wrist. Due to the guilt from the car accident, Jess returns to New York. The incident causes a rift between Lorelai and Luke.

Richard feels he is being pushed out at work so he resigns. He struggles with retirement and eventually opens his own insurance consultancy business. Lane joins the cheerleaders, attempts a romance with Henry and decides she wants to become a drummer. Paris becomes editor of the school newspaper giving her yet another reason to order Rory about, but slowly they realize they have become friends. Jackson proposes to Sookie and the two get engaged, while Michel has a visit from his mother. Lorelai finishes her associate degree in business and has a graduation ceremony, which Rory missed because she snuck on a bus to go to New York and see Jess, whom she hadn't seen since the accident.

In the season finale, Paris and Rory are elected as class president and vice-president, meaning they will have to spend the summer in Washington. The night before Sookie and Jackson's wedding, Lorelai sleeps with Christopher, but their attempt at being a family quickly falters hours later when he hears Sherry is pregnant and goes back to her. Right before the wedding, Jess returns to town and Rory kisses him even though she is still dating Dean. The season closes with a stricken Lorelai and Rory walking down the aisle as Sookie's bridesmaids, both confused as to where their romantic lives will now be headed.

== Cast ==
=== Main cast ===
- Lauren Graham as Lorelai Gilmore, Rory's mother.
- Alexis Bledel as Rory Gilmore, Lorelai's daughter.
- Melissa McCarthy as Sookie St. James, Lorelai's best friend and co-worker.
- Keiko Agena as Lane Kim, Rory's best friend.
- Yanic Truesdale as Michel Gerard, Lorelai and Sookie's co-worker.
- Scott Patterson as Luke Danes, the owner of the local diner.
- Liza Weil as Paris Geller, (Note: Only credited in the episodes in which they appear.) Rory's classmate and frenemy.
- Jared Padalecki as Dean Forester, Rory's boyfriend.
- Milo Ventimiglia as Jess Mariano, Luke's nephew and Dean's rival.
- Kelly Bishop as Emily Gilmore, Lorelai's mother and Rory's grandmother.
- Edward Herrmann as Richard Gilmore, Lorelai's father and Rory's grandfather.

=== Recurring cast ===
- Sean Gunn as Kirk Gleason, a resident of Stars Hollow that works many jobs.
- Liz Torres as Miss Patty, the owner of the local dance studio.
- Michael Winters as Taylor Doose, the owner of the local grocery store.
- Jackson Douglas as Jackson Belleville, Sookie's fiance.
- Teal Redmann as Louise Grant, Paris's best friend.
- Shelly Cole as Madeline Lynn, Paris's best friend.
- David Sutcliffe as Christopher Hayden, Rory's father and Lorelai's ex-boyfriend.
- Sally Struthers as Babette Dell, Rory and Lorelai's nextdoor neighbor.
- Emily Kuroda as Mrs. Kim, Lane's religious mother.
- Brian Tarantina as Bootsy, a resident of Stars Hollow.
- Scott Cohen as Max Medina, Lorelai's ex-fiance.
- Grant Lee Phillips as Grant, the town troubadour.
- Mike Gandolfi as Andrew, the owner of the local bookstore.
- Ted Rooney as Morey Dell, Babette's husband and Lorelai and Rory's next door neighbor.
- Adam Wylie as Brad Langford, Rory's classmate.
- Rose Abdoo as Gypsy, the owner of the local auto shop.
- Dakin Matthews as Headmaster Hanlin Charleston, the principal of Chilton.
- Biff Yeager as Tom, a resident of Stars Hollow.
- Mädchen Amick as Sherry Tinsdale, Christopher's girlfriend.
- Emily Bergl as Francie Jarvis, Rory's classmate.

=== Guest ===
- Chad Michael Murray as Tristin Dugray, Rory's classmate and admirer.
- Scout Taylor Compton as Clara Forester, Dean's younger sister.

Cast notes

== Episodes ==
No. overall	No. in season	Title	Directed by	Written by	Original release date	Prod. code	US viewers (millions)
22	1	"Sadie, Sadie"	Amy Sherman-Palladino	Amy Sherman-Palladino	October 9, 2001	227451	6.55
Lane freaks out when her parents buy her a one-way ticket to Korea for the summer. Luke gives Lorelai a lot to think about when she tells him about Max's proposal. Lorelai finally says "yes" to Max and tells everyone except her parents. When Rory brings Dean to a special dinner at her grandparents' house to celebrate making it into the top 3% at Chilton, Richard criticizes Dean for not meeting the Gilmore standards of excellence. Rory springs to Dean's defense and that creates a rift between Richard and his granddaughter. Emily is heartbroken when she finds out about the wedding from Sookie instead of Lorelai and tells Richard to apologize to Rory.
23	2	"Hammers and Veils"	Michael Katleman	Amy Sherman-Palladino	October 9, 2001	227452	6.55
Lorelai avoids telling her parents about her engagement to Max, while Rory urges her to spill. But due to a call from Sookie asking them to come to a surprise wedding shower for the happy couple, they already know, and are appalled that Lorelai did not tell them and so they give her the cold shoulder. Meanwhile, Rory and Dean are having trouble in paradise due to the fact that Rory suddenly becomes obsessed with finding enough extracurricular activities that will set her apart from the hundreds of other Harvard applicants.
24	3	"Red Light on the Wedding Night"	Gail Mancuso	Daniel Palladino	October 16, 2001	227453	5.99
Lorelai, Sookie, Emily, Michel, and Rory go to a drag club for Lorelai's bachelorette party. Emily regales the group with stories about the week before her wedding, some of which give Lorelai pause about her own feelings about marriage. When everyone else leaves to call their sweeties, Lorelai calls Christopher instead of Max. Later that evening at home, Lorelai announces to Rory that she is calling the wedding off because she has realized that Max is not the one for her. Mother and daughter decide to take a road trip to avoid the sympathies of all of Stars Hollow.
25	4	"The Road Trip to Harvard"	Jamie Babbit	Daniel Palladino	October 23, 2001	227454	6.39
To escape everyone's reaction to the news of the broken engagement, Lorelai and Rory hit the road, and stumble upon the bed and breakfast from hell before eventually arriving at Harvard, where Rory gets a taste of college life and Lorelai muses over what might have been. Lane comes home loaded with bootlegs from Seoul. Lorelai breaks into tears when she sees the chuppah that Luke made for her. Luke commiserates with Lorelai even though he is secretly overjoyed to hear that the wedding's off. Lorelai decides to get serious about making her dream of opening an inn a reality.
26	5	"Nick & Nora/Sid & Nancy"	Michael Katleman	Amy Sherman-Palladino	October 30, 2001	227455	5.55
Luke's nephew, Jess, comes to live in Stars Hollow. Lorelai finds out and offers Luke some guidance, but is rebuffed. Jess is sullen and angry with everyone except Rory, and gets accused of stealing money from the market. Luke confronts Jess. Paris is intent on making Rory's life miserable, so she sabotages her participation on "The Franklin", but this backfires when the faculty advisor singles out Rory's article for praise. Undeterred, Paris assigns Rory the job of interviewing Max after she sees him and Rory painfully avoid each other in the hall.
27	6	"Presenting Lorelai Gilmore"	Chris Long	Sheila R. Lawrence	November 6, 2001	227456	6.11
At the urging of her friends, Emily decides that Rory's making her society debut at the Daughters of the American Revolution Annual Debutante Ball will be just the thing to get Richard back into the social swing. To Lorelai's amazement, Rory willingly agrees and Emily goes into high gear shopping in preparation. Christopher agrees to escort Rory and Lorelai becomes entranced by his new responsible side, but gets a shock when she learns about his new relationship.
28	7	"Like Mother, Like Daughter"	Dennis Erdman	Joan Binder Weiss	November 13, 2001	227457	5.88
Headmaster Charleston decrees that both Gilmore girls need to improve their socialization skills at Chilton. Rory's attempt to socialize leads her to ask a group of girls at lunch if she could join them. After lunch, Paris tells her the group that she innocently stumbled into is "The Puffs", Chilton's most elite secret sorority. The Puffs "kidnap" Rory, Paris and the other pledges early one morning under the guise of taking them to breakfast, but instead take them to Headmaster Charleston's office to be initiated into the group. They are discovered by Charleston and the security guards. Lorelai joins the Booster Club and offers to host a fundraising fashion show at the Inn. To her dismay, she discovers that the Booster Club mothers are the models; wanting to exact a little payback, she signs Emily up to model as well.
29	8	"The Ins and Outs of Inns"	Michael Katleman	Daniel Palladino	November 20, 2001	227458	5.49
Lorelai and Sookie gear up their plans to open an inn, but encounter a roadblock when the owner of their dream location refuses to sell the property. Mia, the owner of the Independence Inn unexpectedly visits, and Lorelai begins to experience guilt at leaving the Inn that they call home. But Mia is supportive and enthusiastic, and announces that this was just the opportunity she was waiting for to sell the Inn. Lorelai is saddened at this news and tells Emily how much the Inn means to her, oblivious to the pain she is causing her mother. Lorelai's emotional turmoil culminates with having an argument with Sookie. After a pep talk from Luke, Lorelai apologizes to Sookie. Emily decides to meet Mia, without Lorelai knowing, to ask if she has any pictures of the girls from those days, and Mia eagerly agrees to send them to her. Someone has planted a fake murder scene at the front of Doose's market. After scouring Stars Hollow looking for the culprit, Taylor confronts Luke at the diner and accuses Jess. Luke jumps to Jess's defense and throws Taylor out. Later that evening, Luke, Lorelai, Rory and Mia stumble upon a secret town meeting where Jess is accused. Luke stands behind his nephew again, supported by Lorelai. The next day, Rory tells Jess that she knows he is really the culprit, and that he is being a jerk for letting Luke take all the heat from everyone in Stars Hollow.
30	9	"Run Away, Little Boy"	Danny Leiner	John Stephens	November 27, 2001	227459	5.79
Lorelai receives a late wedding present without a card attached, and insists that it be returned. Sookie tells Lorelai to get some closure on her relationship with Max. Rory, Paris, Madeline and Louise are assigned to present the death scene from "Romeo and Juliet" as part of the Chilton Shakespearean Festival. When a scheduling mix up occurs with the rehearsal hall, the group convene in Stars Hollow to practice. Tristin wastes no time in going to the market and taunting Dean. The next day at school, Rory pleads with Tristin not to mention anything to Dean about their kiss at the party. When Dean shows up to watch the rehearsal, Tristin taunts both Dean and Rory before he finally bails. On the evening of the performance, Tristin is nowhere to be found. He finally shows up to tell Rory that his father has pulled him out of Chilton. Paris storms off, puts on his costume, and takes over as Romeo.
31	10	"The Bracebridge Dinner"	Chris Long	Daniel Palladino	December 11, 2001	227460	5.27
A blizzard prevents a group from attending the historical dinner that Sookie has painstakingly prepared at their request, so she and Lorelai decide to invite all their friends in Stars Hollow to enjoy the feast at the Inn. At Rory's urging, Lorelai also invites Richard and Emily, in an attempt to boost Richard's spirits. During dinner, Emily is hurt and angered when Richard reveals that he has quit his job without consulting her. Jess tries to get between Rory and Dean when Dean is distracted by his little sister.
32	11	"Secrets and Loans"	Nicole Holofcener	Linda Loiselle Guzik	January 22, 2002	227461	5.59
Lorelai and Rory have an argument after Rory goes against her mother's wishes and asks her grandparents to lend Lorelai the money she needs to repair termite damage to their house. Lane's desire to become a cheerleader causes a strain in her relationship with Rory. After an exhaustive and unproductive attempt to raise the funds she needs based on her own credit rating, Lorelai is forced to ask Emily to cosign a loan. Rory drives Paris crazy when she refuses to reveal her PSAT scores.
33	12	"Richard in Stars Hollow"	Steve Gomer	Frank Lombardi	January 29, 2002	227462	5.83
Richard visits Stars Hollow, and drives Lorelai and Rory crazy by passing judgment on every aspect of their lives. Paris visits Stars Hallow searching for a "seedy underbelly" for the front story of the Franklin. Rory gains unexpected praise when she accidentally encourages censorship in the Stars Hollow Video store, which Paris uses as their basis for their assignment.
34	13	"A-Tisket, A-Tasket"	Robert Berlinger	Amy Sherman-Palladino	February 5, 2002	227463	5.48
The annual Stars Hollow charity picnic basket lunch auction sparks controversies among couples throughout town. Jess outbids Dean for Rory's basket, causing Dean and Rory to quarrel when Rory abides by tradition and shares the lunch with Jess. Jackson refuses to bid on Sookie's basket after she leads him to believe that she does not want to move in together. Luke comes to Lorelai's rescue, after Miss Patty sets Lorelai up with a trio of unsuitable bidders. Henry tires of the end runs around Mrs. Kim, and calls it quits with Lane. Rory and Jess hit it off at lunch and Jess leaves with a secret souvenir — the bracelet that Dean gave Rory, which he picks it up and holds on to after Rory drops it. Sookie and Jackson work things out so well that he proposes and she accepts. Lorelai and Rory quarrel when Rory finds out that her mother lent a sympathetic ear to Dean's concerns about Jess. After Emily agrees with her daughter's distrust of Jess, Lorelai realizes that they are both wrong, and apologizes to her daughter.
35	14	"It Should've Been Lorelai"	Lesli Linka Glatter	Daniel Palladino	February 12, 2002	227464	5.34
Christopher comes to town to see Rory do her debate but he brings his girlfriend, Sherry, along. Since Sherry and Christopher's relationship is getting serious, Sherry wants to begin bonding with Rory on Friday night. Without consulting Emily, Lorelai excuses Rory from the Gilmore Friday night dinner, and takes Christopher with her instead. When Emily finds out about Sherry over cocktails, she has a meltdown and rushes off to the kitchen. Lorelai follows her and finds out that Emily has always envisioned that Lorelai and Christopher would end up together. Now that she sees that this is not going to happen, Emily blames Lorelai for always keeping him, and everyone else, at arm's length. After mulling over her mother's words, the next morning Lorelai tells Christopher that she has always thought that they would get back together, too, and that is why she has never had a relationship that lasted, including the one with Max. Christopher gets very angry, refusing to accept the responsibility for the way Lorelai's romantic life has turned out.
36	15	"Lost and Found"	Gail Mancuso	Amy Sherman-Palladino	February 26, 2002	227465	5.52
Rory embarks upon a campaign to improve Lorelai's relationship with Jess, and convinces her to let him clean out their gutters so he can make some extra money. Luke, annoyed by his cramped living quarters, goes apartment hunting. With the help of Lorelai, Luke is able to find a great place, but is shocked when he finds out who owns the building. Meanwhile, Dean notices that Rory is not wearing the bracelet that he made for her. Rory makes up an excuse, but later flips into panic mode when she can not find the bracelet.
37	16	"There's the Rub"	Amy Sherman-Palladino	Sheila R. Lawrence	April 9, 2002	227466	4.24
When Emily and Lorelai go to a spa for a weekend of relaxation, Emily lets her hair down, kicks up her heels and ends up bonding with Lorelai in a way that only her daughter could inspire. Thrilled that she has the house all to herself, Rory hopes to spend a quiet night at home doing laundry and eating Indian food. Her plans are foiled – first by Paris, then by Jess, and finally by Dean. In the process, she discovers that she has a surprising savior, a secret suitor, and a skeptical sweetheart.
38	17	"Dead Uncles and Vegetables"	Jamie Babbit	Daniel Palladino	April 16, 2002	227467	5.06
Lorelai and Rory pitch in at the diner while Luke plans his Uncle Louie's funeral. Taylor is unhinged when a farmer's market opens in the town square and puts a damper on his business. Emily goes completely overboard in helping Sookie plan her wedding. Rory prods Jess into being more of a help. Luke is upset when family and friends cite Louie's unpleasant personality as a reason for not attending his funeral, but is comforted when Stars Hollow comes through for both him and his uncle in the end.
39	18	"Back in the Saddle Again"	Kevin Dowling	Linda Loiselle Guzik	April 23, 2002	227468	4.62
Rory asks Richard for help in creating and marketing a first-aid kit for Chilton's annual Business Fair, which leads him to realize that he is unhappy in retirement and wants to start a second career. Fresh from having underbid on Rory's lunch basket and the loss of the bracelet he made for her, Dean goes overboard in trying to be close to Rory, afraid that she is losing interest in him, and finally becomes resigned to her affection for Jess. At first, Michel is ecstatic when his flamboyant mother Giselle visits, but after Lorelai causes problems for him when she reveals to Giselle that Michel has been holding back from his mother, Michel quickly is driven crazy by his mother's incessant questioning.
40	19	"Teach Me Tonight"	Steve Robman	Amy Sherman-Palladino	April 30, 2002	227469	5.26
Lorelai's complaint about Taylor's choice for "Movie in the Square Night" lands her the responsibility for picking the evening's entertainment, but her enthusiasm for the task is quickly dampened when Taylor informs her that she must make a choice from a list of free movies which does not include any masterpieces. Against her better judgment, Lorelai agrees to Luke's request that Rory tutor an about-to-flunk-out Jess. Rory and Jess decide to take a break from studying to get some ice cream, and with Jess behind the wheel, get into a car accident which leaves Rory with a fractured wrist and a totaled car. A distraught Lorelai blames Luke for the accident, creating a serious rift in their relationship. Christopher arrives in the middle of the night ready to go after Jess, but he has already left Stars Hollow to return home. Kirk's short film premieres at Movie Night.
41	20	"Help Wanted"	Chris Long	Allan Heinberg	May 7, 2002	227470	5.97
Richard opens a new office and hires a secretary, named Karen, with Lorelai's help. Dean comes home with Rory sitting on his porch. She writes a note to Dean explaining what happened with her arm and the car that he made for her. Meanwhile, Lane falls in love with a drum set at the Stars Hollow's new music shop and discovers that becoming a rock drummer is her new dream in life. Rory is dismayed to discover that everyone blames Jess for the accident despite her protestations. To the consternation of all in Stars Hollow, Luke closes the diner and goes fishing.
42	21	"Lorelai's Graduation Day"	Jamie Babbit	Daniel Palladino	May 14, 2002	227471	5.23
Lorelai and Rory have breakfast at Sookie's in an effort to avoid Luke's, but Lorelai can not avoid an awkward encounter with him at Doose's Market, where he fails to pick up on her hints to patch things up. In an effort to help Lorelai through final exam stress, Rory gets her excited about attending her college graduation ceremony and secretly invites Richard and Emily, despite Lorelai's assertion that they would never agree to attend. After a late night phone call from Jess, Rory impulsively cuts school the next day and visits him in Manhattan. Christopher sends Lorelai a graduation gift basket filled with fun goodies and an expensive necklace. Lorelai is shocked to see Emily, Richard, and the film crew accompanying them to her graduation, and must contend with an obnoxious classmate with an attitude about the rich. Rory is furious with herself when she takes the wrong bus home and misses her mother's graduation. When Rory finally arrives home, Lorelai forgives her when she realizes that the trip to New York may indicate that her daughter has fallen in love with Jess, despite her protests to the contrary.
43	22	"I Can't Get Started"	Amy Sherman-Palladino	Amy Sherman-Palladino & John Stephens	May 21, 2002	227472	6.21
Sookie's wedding draws near, while Lorelai finally relents and goes into the diner, where she apologizes profusely to Luke. Christopher comes to town for the removal of Rory's cast and decides to stay for Sookie's wedding. While Lorelai and Chris seem to be getting along, Sherry drops a bomb. Paris is running for student body president, and selects Rory as her vice-presidential running mate. Jess returns to Stars Hollow and asks Luke repeatedly if he can stay even though he is warned about interfering with Rory and Dean.

== DVD release ==
The Complete Second Season
Set details		Special features		
22 episodes; 6-disc set; 1.33:1 aspect ratio; Subtitles: English; English (Dolby Digital 2.0 Surround)		Additional scenes; "Sadie, Sadie"; "Presenting Lorelai Gilmore"; "There's the Rub"; "I Can't Get Started"; "A Film by Kirk"; "International Success" featurette; Gilmore Goodies & Gossip: On-Screen Factoids — "A-Tisket, A-Tasket"; "Who Wants to Argue" shouting matches; "Guide to Gilmorisms" booklet		
Release dates
North America	United Kingdom	Continental Europe	Norway	Australia
December 7, 2004	March 13, 2006	March 15, 2006	March 8, 2006	April 5, 2006
