= Teach Me Tonight (Gilmore Girls) =

- Gilmore Girls episode
- Episode no.: Season 2 Episode 19
- Directed by: Steven Robman
- Written by: Amy Sherman-Palladino
- Production code: 227469
- Original air date: April 30, 2002
- Running time: 44 minutes

Episode chronology
← Previous "Back in the Saddle Again"	Next → "Help Wanted"

"Teach Me Tonight" is the 19th episode of season 2 of Gilmore Girls. First airing on April 30, 2002, the episode features Rory attempting to tutor Jess and ending up in a car accident as a result, while Lorelai chooses a movie for the town's local movie festival. "Teach Me Tonight" explores the character of Jess, his relationship with Rory and Lorelai's opinion of this. The episode has received positive reviews from critics, is ranked reasonably highly on several critics' lists of Gilmore Girls episodes, and originally aired to 5.1 million viewers.

== Plot ==
Luke (Scott Patterson) is called in to Stars Hollow High to see the principal, who tells him that Jess (Milo Ventimiglia) is at risk of being held back a year if he does not improve his attendance and grades. As Luke is not an academic person, he decides that he needs to find Jess a tutor, and settles on Rory (Alexis Bledel) because he knows that Jess is fond of Rory. Lorelai (Lauren Graham) is not happy with this arrangement, distrusting Jess, but Rory agrees. However, she is unable to teach Jess effectively as he distracts himself with magic tricks, making book recommendations to her and convinces her to take a break and go get ice-cream. When he is driving back with Rory, having got ice-cream, he swerves to avoid an animal and crashes her car. Other than Rory's fractured wrist, the two are unharmed, but Lorelai is furious at Jess and gets into a vicious argument with Luke.

Meanwhile, Lorelai had been organising the movie for the annual Stars Hollow Movie Festival after learning Taylor (Michael Winters) planned to show The Yearling for the fourth year in a row. Lorelai is disappointed to learn that she can only choose a movie from a particular store that will give discounts for the festival, and after reviewing each movie on the list, she reluctantly chooses to show The Yearling. Kirk (Sean Gunn) approaches her with a film by kirk, a short black and white movie which he has been working on for five years, which Lorelai plays at the beginning of the festival, to the amusement and delight of many townspeople. Rory's father, Christopher (David Sutcliffe) arrives in town after Lorelai calls and tells him about Rory's injury, and stays for the film festival, where Lorelai and Rory learn from Miss Patty and Babette gossiping to each other that Jess has gone back home to live with his mother.

== Analysis ==
In an essay within Screwball Television: Critical Perspectives on Gilmore Girls, the author writes that "so much of this episode's running time is devoted to the education of its audience", noting "over two dozen" allusions to films. The choices of The Yearling and Babe are said to remind the audience of Rory's youthfulness, in contrast to the mentions of Crimes and Misdemeanors to evoke Jess' personality. In addition, the allusions conflate high and low culture, particularly Kirk's confusion of Asaad Kelada with Akira Kurosawa.

Roberts of Bustle sees Jess crashing the car Dean built for Rory as "foreshadowing for how he'll also help to eventually destroy Dean and Rory's actual relationship"; Bonaime of Paste agrees, saying "there's no better symbol of the Rory/Jess/Dean triangle than Rory's car".

David Sims of The A.V. Club says this episode, along with the following episode "Help Wanted", is the "necessary conclusion" to the show's arc where "Jess annoys everyone" and "Lorelai is weirdly insensitive and unlikable about it", but does not find Jess' "typical bad boy" persona convincing as "the show won't allow him to be truly off the rails, and won't allow his life to be truly miserable". Grady of Vox says that Rory and Jess' discussion of their future in this episode "sets up the dynamic that allows Jess's return in season six to feel earned", as the pair are "both consistently good at seeing what the other person is capable of, and of telling them so in a way the other person can hear".

In the book Gilmore Girls and the Politics of Identity, this episode is used as an example for Lorelai's protectiveness and concern over Rory in both "body and mind", as demonstrated by her "frantic" response to learning of Rory's accident; Lorelai's motives for discouraging Rory interacting with Jess come from her view of her daughter as "an inordinate studier" and "a determined and focused young woman". In a review for The A.V. Club, Sims notes that Lorelai's fury at Luke is "a surprisingly unsympathetic moment for her", though is unsure whether "the show intends it as such".

== Reception ==
=== Ratings ===
"Teach Me Tonight" first aired in the U.S. on April 30, 2002, and received an overnight rating of 5.1 million viewers.

=== Reviews ===
David Sims of The A.V. Club gives the episode a positive review, calling it a "real winner" and "the most dramatic the show has been by far". Though saying that the episode "only partially succeeds at unraveling" Jess, Sims compliments Lauren Graham's display of "complicated feelings with great subtlety" and Scott Patterson's portrayal of panic in the scene where Luke gets angry at Lorelai.

"Teach Me Tonight" appeared highly on rankings of all 153 episodes of Gilmore Girls. In Paste, "Teach Me Tonight" is 11th as it features "some of the most dramatic moments of the series' first two seasons", along with a film by kirk ("the funniest, most absurd moment of the entire series"). In Vox, the episode is 15th; Grady calls Rory and Jess "at their most entertaingly flirty" in this episode.

In 2016, "Teach Me Tonight" appeared on multiple lists of recommended episodes for viewers to rewatch in anticipation of A Year in the Life: the episode is 4th (of 15) on People's Choice's list, 8th (of 28) on Bustle's list, and 14th (of 50) on Revelist's list.

Sean Gunn, who plays Kirk, rated this 6th on his list of 10 favourite Gilmore Girls episodes, due to a film by kirk, which he states is one of the two episodes fans mention most when meeting him. An article in Paste says Kirk is the "surprising star" of the episode, describing a film by kirk as "a David Lynch-style masterpiece so so wonderfully strange that it counts among the series' finest moments". An article in Bustle describes the short film as "hilariously awesome" and the most "impactful" of Kirk's "prolific moments" across the series.

The podcast Gilmore Guys rated the episode an average of 7.13 out of 10 with their guest, Sean Clements.
