= Kat Dennings =

American actress (born 1986)

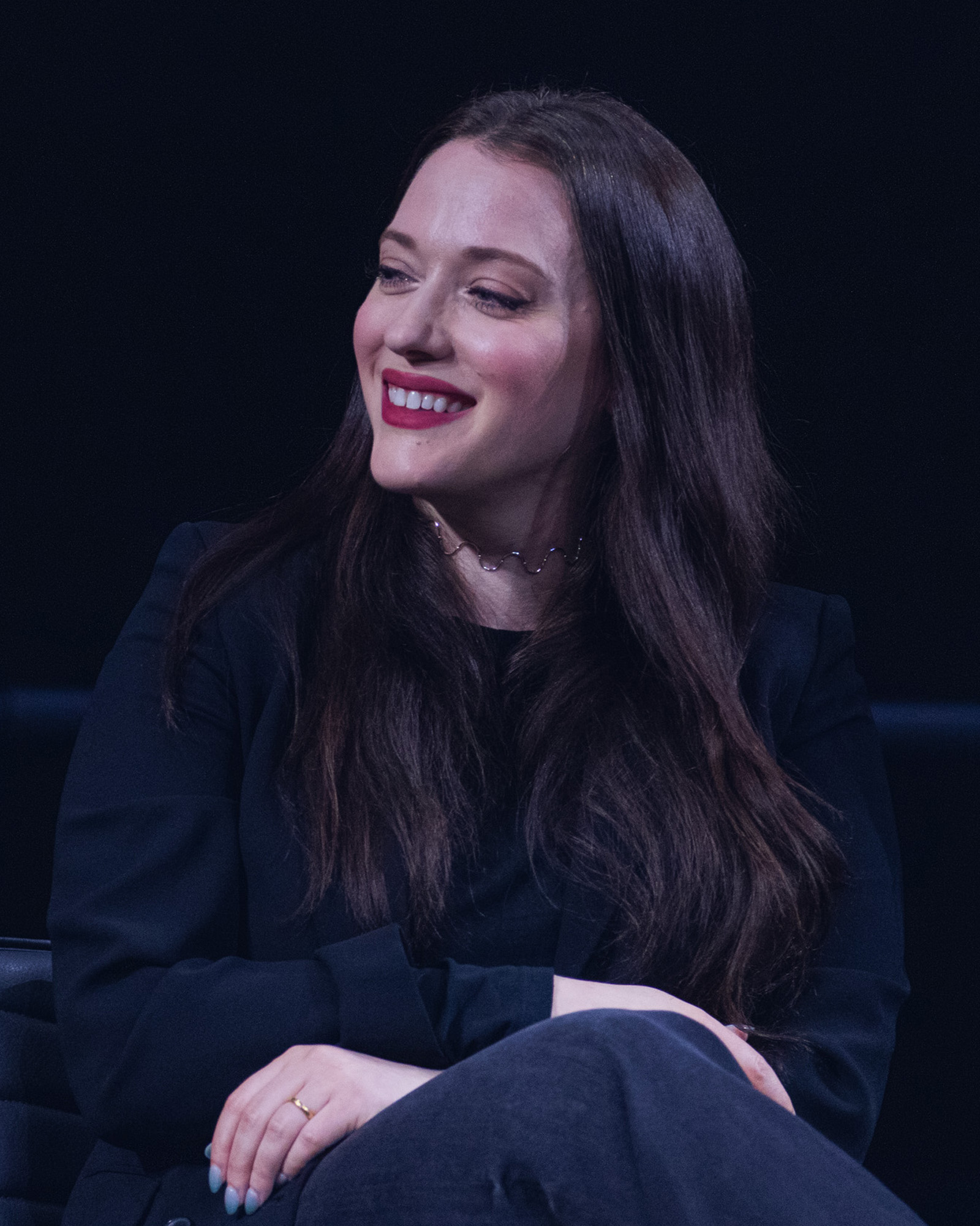
- Dennings in 2025
- Born: Katherine Victoria Litwack; June 13, 1986 (age 40); Bryn Mawr, Pennsylvania, U.S.
- Occupation: Actress
- Years active: 2000–present
- Spouse: Andrew W.K. (m. 2023)

Katherine Victoria Litwack (born June 13, 1986), known professionally as Kat Dennings, is an American actress. She is known for her starring roles as Max Black in the CBS sitcom 2 Broke Girls (2011–2017) and as Darcy Lewis in the Marvel Cinematic Universe (MCU) superhero films and television franchise beginning with Thor (2011).

Since making her acting debut in 2000, Dennings has appeared in films including The 40-Year-Old Virgin (2005), Big Momma's House 2 (2006), Charlie Bartlett (2007), The House Bunny (2008), Nick and Norah's Infinite Playlist (2008), Shorts (2009), Defendor (2009), and Suburban Gothic (2014).

== Early life ==
Katherine Victoria Litwack was born on June 13, 1986, in Bryn Mawr, Pennsylvania, a suburb of Philadelphia. Her mother, Ellen Judith Litwack, is a poet and speech therapist, and her father, Gerald J. Litwack, was a molecular pharmacologist, and college professor and chairman. Dennings is the youngest of five children. Her family is Jewish. Dennings grew up in Penn Cottage, a historic house built in 1694 in Wynnewood, Pennsylvania, which she claims was haunted.

Beginning her career at age 9 by acting in commercials, Dennings said her family never had much money for formal acting training. Her first acting job was an advertisement for potato chips that included a poisonous ingredient and never made it to market. In her early years, she worked as an extra to earn her SAG card.

Dennings was homeschooled; her only enrollment at a traditional school was for a half-day at Friends' Central School. She graduated from high school early at age 14, and moved with her family to Los Angeles to pursue acting full time. In an interview with Philadelphia magazine in 2008, she explained that she chose "Dennings" as her professional last name because she thought her family name was "a little hideous" and she "wanted to know when someone really knew [her] or they didn't." The last name was based on that of Janine Denni, the wife of Lloyd Alexander, a personal friend of her mother.

== Career ==
=== 2000–2003: Early career ===
Dennings made her professional debut with an appearance on HBO's Sex and the City in 2000, in the episode "Hot Child in the City", playing an obnoxious 13-year-old who hires Samantha to handle publicity for her bat mitzvah. She then starred on the short-lived WB sitcom Raising Dad from 2001 to 2002 as Sarah, a 15-year-old raised by her widowed father (Bob Saget), with a pre-teen sister (Brie Larson). In 2002, Dennings appeared in the Disney Channel film The Scream Team as a teenager who stumbles into a group of ghosts. She was cast for a five-episode run on The WB's Everwood, but the role was recast with Nora Zehetner.

=== 2004–2011: Feature film debut and further roles ===
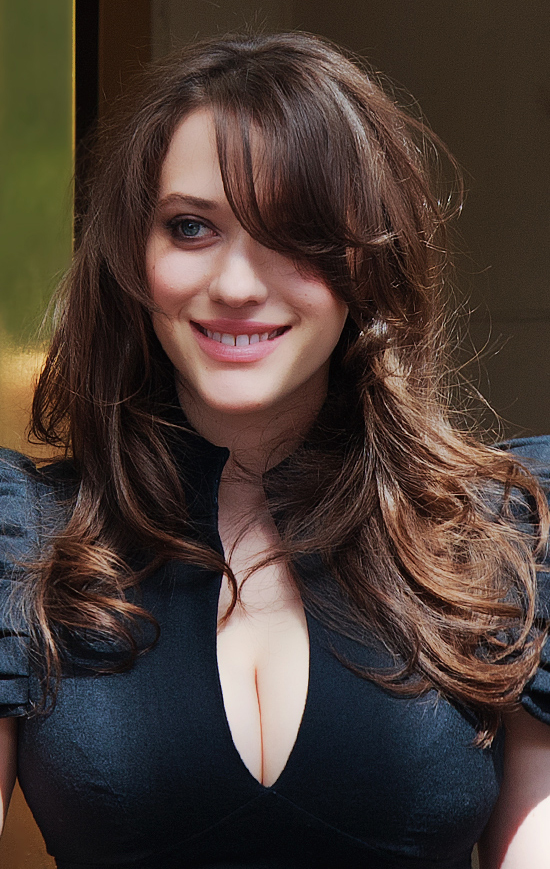
Dennings at the 2010 Toronto International Film Festival

Dennings continued working on television, guest-starring on Without a Trace as a teen whose boyfriend goes missing, and on Less than Perfect in 2003. In February 2004, she was cast in a pilot for CBS titled Sudbury, about a family of modern-day witches, based on the 1998 film Practical Magic, but the series was not picked up. Dennings had a recurring role on ER from 2005 to 2006 as Zoe Butler, and twice guest-starred in the CSI franchise: first on CSI, as Missy Wilson in the 2004 episode "Early Rollout". Secondly, she played Sarah Endecott on CSI: NY, in the 2005 episode "Manhattan Manhunt".

Dennings made her feature film debut in Hilary Duff's Raise Your Voice in 2004 as Sloane, a somber piano student. In 2005, she landed supporting roles as the daughter of Catherine Keener's character in The 40-Year-Old Virgin and as April in Down in the Valley. In 2006, Dennings played a rebellious teenager in the crime comedy film Big Momma's House 2, starring Martin Lawrence.

Dennings starred in Charlie Bartlett in 2008, the story of a wealthy teenager (Anton Yelchin) who acts as a psychiatrist among students at his new public high school. She played Susan Gardner, Bartlett's love interest and the daughter of the school's Principal Gardner, played by Robert Downey Jr. Dennings appeared in The House Bunny that year, as Mona, a pierced feminist sorority girl.

She also starred that year in the teen comedy romance Nick and Norah's Infinite Playlist, with Michael Cera. Dennings played Norah Silverberg, the daughter of a famous record producer. She was nominated for the International Press Academy's Satellite Award for Best Actress for her performance.

In September 2008, Dennings was involved in a project to adapt Don DeLillo's novel End Zone as a film. Actors Sam Rockwell and Josh Hartnett were also involved, but the project was not greenlit because of its subject matter of nuclear war was considered too controversial.

In 2009, Dennings appeared in The Answer Man, a film about a celebrity author whose manifestos become a sort of new Bible. She also co-starred in the Robert Rodriguez-directed dark children's film Shorts that year. She played Stacey Thompson, the teenage older sister of the protagonist Toe (Jimmy Bennett).

Dennings and other rising stars were featured in the August 2009 issue of Vanity Fair, photographed re-enacting scenes from famous Depression-era films. She was shown in a setting from Sydney Pollack's They Shoot Horses, Don't They? (1969).

Dennings was cast in the romantic comedy film Liars (A to E), to be directed by Richard Linklater, but the project was cancelled due to cutbacks at Miramax Films by the studio's parent company, Disney. Dennings appeared in the superhero film Defendor in 2009, starring Woody Harrelson and Sandra Oh, playing a crack-addicted prostitute.

The following year, she starred in the independent feature Daydream Nation, as a girl who moves from the city to a strange rural town, and is caught in a love triangle with her high school teacher (Josh Lucas) and a teenage drug dealer (Reece Thompson). The film began shooting in Vancouver in early 2010, and was written and directed by Michael Golbach. In May 2010, Dennings appeared in a music video for "40 Dogs (Like Romeo and Juliet)", a single by Austin, Texas-based musician Bob Schneider. Robert Rodriguez directed the video, which was filmed in various locations around Austin.

Dennings was part of the cast of the Marvel Studios film Thor, released in May 2011, and directed by Kenneth Branagh. She played Darcy Lewis, a tech-savvy sidekick and assistant to Natalie Portman's character, Jane Foster. The film went into production in January 2010, and was shot in New Mexico for six weeks in early 2010.

=== 2011–present: 2 Broke Girls and other projects ===
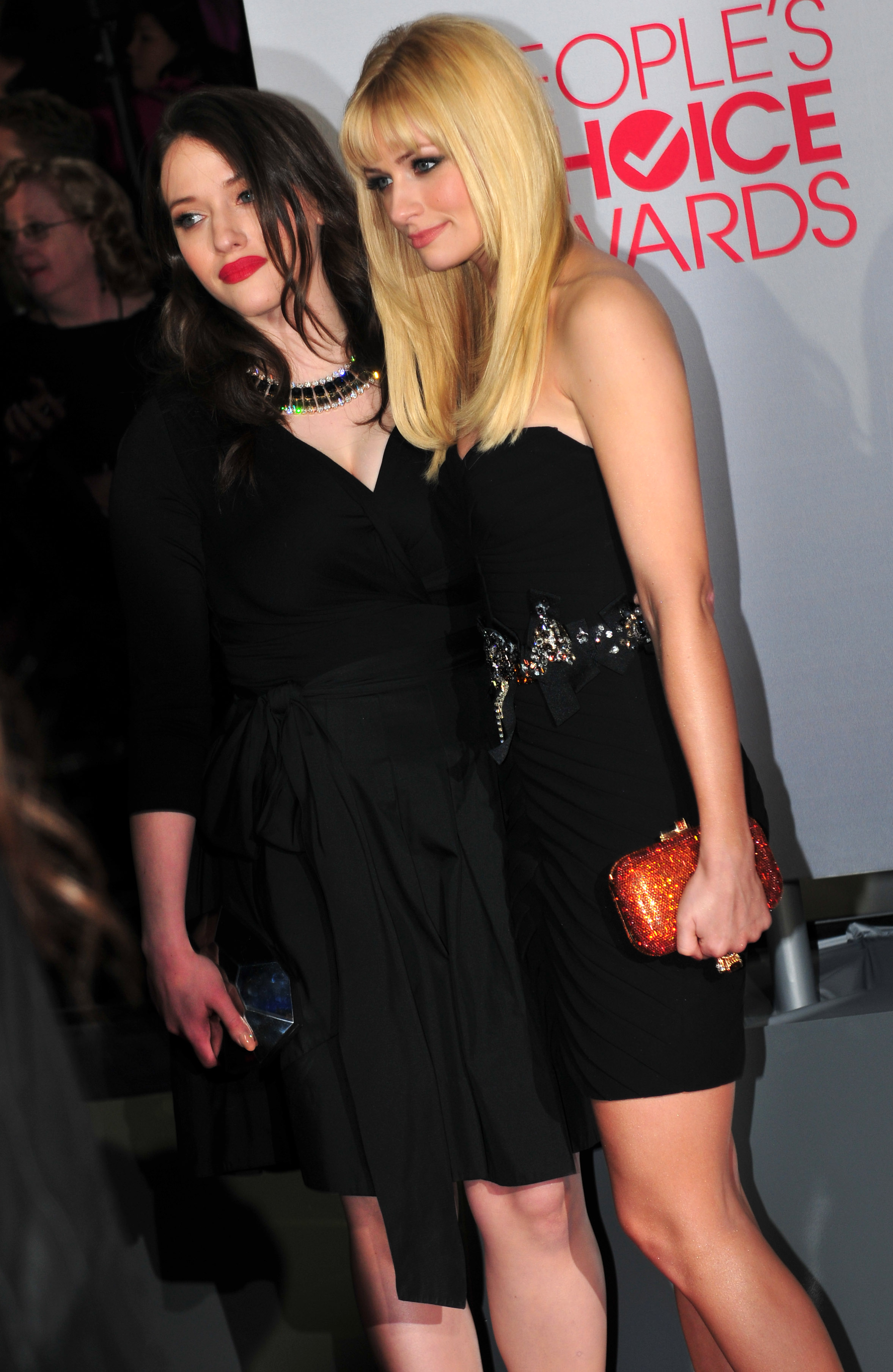
Dennings with her 2 Broke Girls co-star Beth Behrs at the 38th People's Choice Awards in January 2012

In February 2011, Dennings was cast in 2 Broke Girls, a CBS sitcom written and produced by Michael Patrick King and comedian Whitney Cummings. The series debuted on September 19, 2011, and follows the lives of two underemployed girls. Beth Behrs co-stars as a Manhattan heiress who lost her inheritance, while Dennings plays a tough outspoken girl from Brooklyn. Dennings liked the idea of reaching a wider audience with her work, so she accepted the role on the network sitcom. On May 12, 2017, CBS canceled the series after six seasons.

Dennings starred in the drama film To Write Love on Her Arms (originally titled Renee) in 2012, with Chad Michael Murray and Rupert Friend. She played Renee Yohe, a Florida teenager who struggled with substance abuse and self-injury, and who inspired the founding of the nonprofit organization To Write Love on Her Arms. The film began production in Orlando, Florida, in February 2011.

In mid-2012, Dennings filmed the independent feature Suburban Gothic, playing a small-town bartender. The film premiered in 2014.

Dennings introduced The Black Keys at the 55th Grammy Awards on February 10, 2013. She appeared in a music video for the Hanson single "Get the Girl Back", alongside Nikki Reed. The actresses are close friends and are both fans of the pop group.

The video premiered on April 4, 2013. In 2013, Dennings reprised her role as Darcy Lewis in Thor: The Dark World. She worked on the film and 2 Broke Girls at the same time, flying to London to film for six months between breaks on her CBS sitcom.

In 2018, it was announced that Dennings would star as Abby in the comedy film Friendsgiving.

Dennings starred in the Hulu comedy series Dollface, beginning in November 2019. She reprised her role as Darcy Lewis in the Disney+ miniseries WandaVision (2021), and in Thor: Love and Thunder (2022).

== Personal life ==
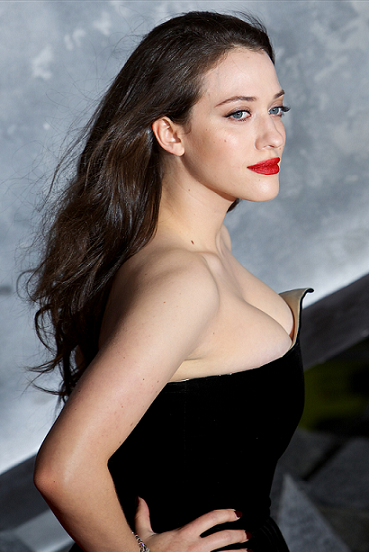
Dennings in 2013

In 2008, Dennings stated that Judaism "is an important part of my history, but, as a whole, religion is not a part of my life." She considers herself more ethnically and culturally affiliated than religiously so.

From 2001 to 2010, Dennings maintained a blog, and also dabbled in video blogging on YouTube.

As of 2021, Dennings lives in Los Angeles with her cat, Millie. She is an animal welfare supporter.

Dennings does not smoke and abstains from drinking alcohol.

=== Relationships ===
From 2011 to 2014, Dennings dated her 2 Broke Girls co-star Nick Zano. From 2014 to 2016, Dennings dated singer Josh Groban.

On May 6, 2021, musician Andrew W.K. confirmed that Dennings was in a relationship with him, which started after they had met in Los Angeles earlier that year. A week later, on May 13, 2021, the couple announced their engagement on Instagram. They married on November 27, 2023, at their Los Angeles home.

== Filmography ==
=== Film ===
Year	Title	Role	Notes
2004	Raise Your Voice	Sloane	
2005	Down in the Valley	April	
2005	The 40-Year-Old Virgin	Marla Piedmont	
2005	London	Lilly	
2006	Big Momma's House 2	Molly Fuller	
2007	Charlie Bartlett	Susan Gardner	
2008	The House Bunny	Mona Rita	
2008	Nick & Norah's Infinite Playlist	Norah Silverberg	
2009	The Answer Man	Dahlia	
2009	Shorts	Stacey Thompson	
2009	Defendor	Katerina "Kat" Debrofkowitz / Angel	
2010	Daydream Nation	Caroline Wexler	
2011	Thor	Darcy Lewis	
2012	To Write Love on Her Arms	Renee Yohe	
2013	Thor: The Dark World	Darcy Lewis	
2014	Suburban Gothic	Becca Thompson	
2015	Hollywood Adventures	Herself	Cameo
2020	Friendsgiving	Abby	
2022	Thor: Love and Thunder	Darcy Lewis	Cameo

=== Television ===
Year	Title	Role	Notes
2000	Sex and the City	Jenny Brier	Episode: "Hot Child in the City"
2001–2002	Raising Dad	Sarah Stewart	Main role
2002	The Scream Team	Claire Carlyle	Television film
2003	Without a Trace	Jennifer Norton	Episode: "Sons and Daughters"
2003	Less than Perfect	Kaitlin	Episode: "The Girl Next Door"
2004	CSI: Crime Scene Investigation	Missy Wilson	Episode: "Early Rollout"
2004	Sudbury	Antonia Owens	Unsold television pilot
2005	Clubhouse	Angela	Episode: "Stealing Home"
2005–2006	ER	Zoe Butler	5 episodes
2005	CSI: NY	Sarah Endecott	Episode: "Manhattan Manhunt"
2009	American Dad!	Tanqueray (voice)	Episode: "G-String Circus"
2010	American Dad!	Female juror (voice)	Episode: "The People vs. Martin Sugar"
2011–2017	2 Broke Girls	Max George Black	Main role
2012	Robot Chicken	Various voices	Episode: "Executed by the State"
2014	40th People's Choice Awards	Herself / Host	Television special
2014	Sesame Street	Herself	Episode: "Bert's Training Wheels"
2014	The Newsroom	Blair Lansing	Episode: "Run"
2015	RuPaul's Drag Race	Herself / Guest judge	Episode: "ShakesQueer"
2015–2018	Drunk History	Various	3 episodes
2017–2020	Big Mouth	Leah Birch (voice)	13 episodes
2017	The Simpsons	Valerie (voice)	Episode: "Mr. Lisa's Opus"
2018	Dallas & Robo	Dallas Moonshiner (voice)	Main role; also producer
2019–2022	Dollface	Jules Wiley	Main role; also executive producer
2021	WandaVision	Darcy Lewis	Main role; 5 episodes
2021	Marvel Studios: Assembled	Herself	Documentary; episode: "Assembled: The Making of WandaVision"
2021–2024	What If...?	Darcy Lewis (voice)	4 episodes
2025–present	Shifting Gears	Riley Parker	Main role; also producer

=== Music video ===
Year	Song	Artist	Role
2010	"40 Dogs"	Bob Schneider	
2013	"Get the Girl Back"	Hanson	Love interest
2021	"Everybody Sins"	Andrew WK	Lover

=== Audiobooks ===
Year	Title	Role	Production company
2020	The Sandman	Death	Audible

== Awards and nominations ==
Year	Award	Category	Work	Result
2008	Satellite Award	Best Actress – Motion Picture Drama	Nick and Norah's Infinite Playlist	Nominated
2009	MTV Movie Award	Breakthrough Performance – Female	Nick and Norah's Infinite Playlist	Nominated
2009	Teen Choice Award	Choice Movie Actress: Music/Dance	Nick and Norah's Infinite Playlist	Nominated
2012	Crystal Reel Awards	Best Actress	To Write Love on Her Arms	Won
2014	People's Choice Award	Favorite TV Gal Pals (with Beth Behrs)	2 Broke Girls	Nominated
2021	Hollywood Critics Association TV Awards	Best Supporting Actress in a Limited Series, Anthology Series, or Television Movie	WandaVision	Nominated
2022	Hollywood Critics Association TV Awards	Best Actress in a Streaming Series, Comedy	Dollface	Nominated
