= To Write Love on Her Arms =

American nonprofit organization

- Abbreviation: TWLOHA
- Formation: March 2006; 20 years ago
- Founder: Jamie Tworkowski
- Tax ID no.: 26-0789229
- Legal status: 501(c)(3) tax-exempt
- Purpose: Mission Statement: "To Write Love On Her Arms is a non-profit movement dedicated to presenting hope and finding help for people struggling with depression, addiction, self-injury, and suicide. TWLOHA exists to encourage, inform, inspire, and also to invest directly into treatment and recovery."
- Headquarters: Melbourne, Florida, U.S.
- Official language: English
- Executive Director: Lindsay Kolsch
- Chief Marketing Officer: Mark Codgen
- Board of directors: Stephan Monteserin (President), Morgan Harper Nichols (Vice President), Drew Rector (Secretary), Joél L. Daniels, Tianna Soto, James Inks
- Website: www.twloha.com

To Write Love on Her Arms (TWLOHA) is an American nonprofit organization that aims to present hope for people struggling with addiction, depression, self-injury and thoughts of suicide, while also investing in treatment and recovery. They are based in Melbourne, Florida, and seek to connect people to mental health treatment resources.

To Write Love On Her Arms was founded in 2006 by Jamie Tworkowski. Its name was taken from the title of a short story Tworkowski wrote about his experience with a young addict who self-harmed by cutting the words "FUCK UP" on her arm with a razor blade. Tworkowski and a group of friends stayed with her after she was denied treatment in order to "be her church, the body of Christ coming alive to meet her needs, to write love on her arms".

== History ==
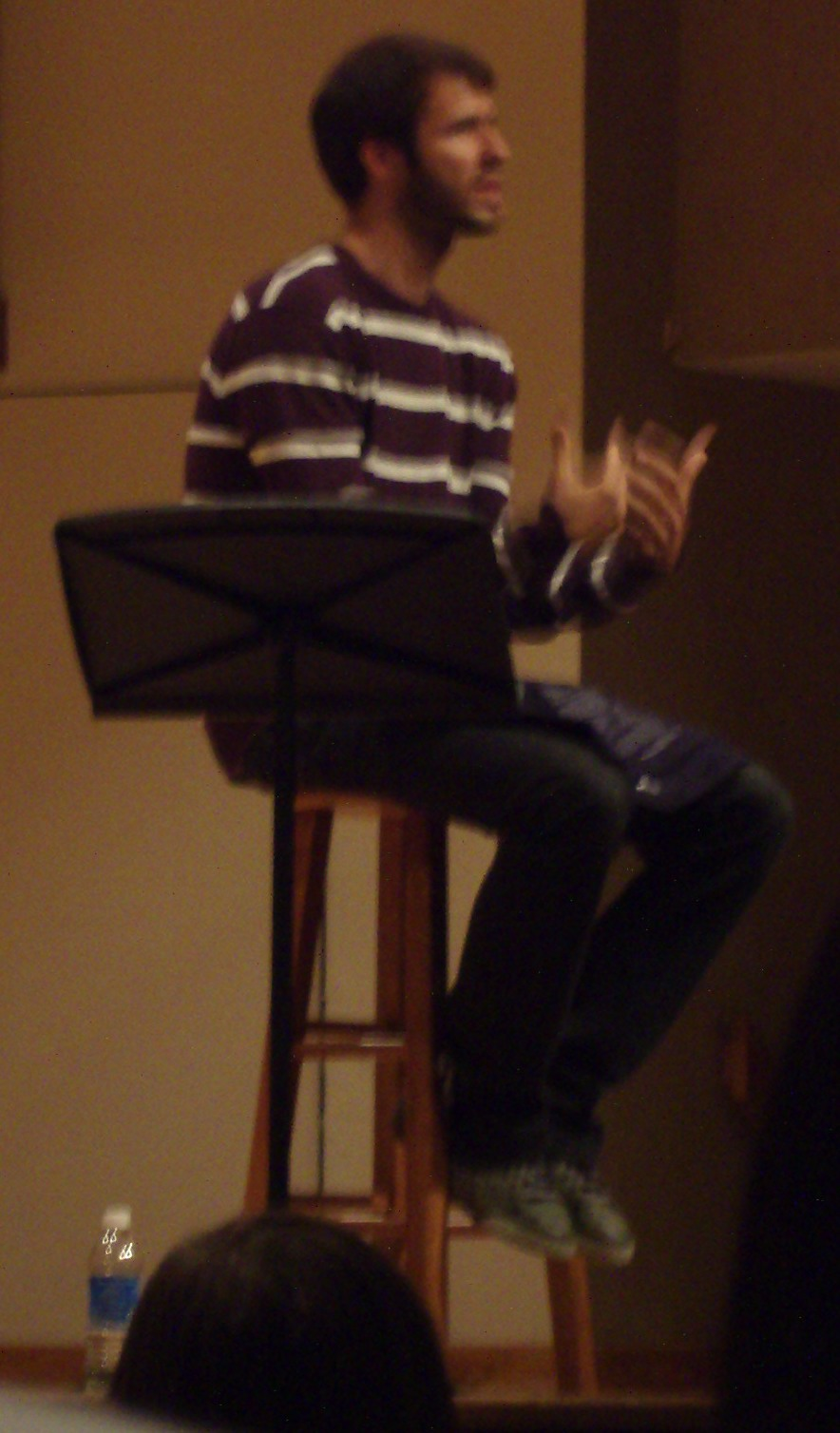
Jamie Tworkowski, the founder of To Write Love on Her Arms, at Taylor University

TWLOHA was founded by Jamie Tworkowski in March 2006. Tworkowski wrote a story titled "To Write Love On Her Arms," about a friend who struggeled with cocaine addiction. The story later inspired him to found the organization.

Yohe's story, and the organization's story, have also been turned to a major motion picture titled To Write Love on Her Arms.

TWLOHA began operating as a non-profit organization in October 2006 under the umbrella of Fireproof Ministries. It became an independent organization in 2007, and it was granted 501(c)(3) tax-exempt status by the IRS in 2009.

Tworkowski stepped down as Executive Director of TWLOHA in 2017 and remained on as an independent contractor until 2021. Lindsay Kolsch and Jessica Haley served as Co-Executive Directors. As of 2025, Jessica Haley is no longer listed as a Co-Executive Director on the TWLOHA website, leaving Lindsay Kolsch as TWLOHA's sole Executive Director.

== Charitable work ==
The organization attempts to provide accessible mental health resources. According to the organization, their Find Help tool has been used for 217,000 searches, and they reach 28 million people every year, with 4.8 million moments of "meaningful connection" and 13,000 connections each day.

TWLOHA also directly assists with mental health treatment through cash grants; according to their website, they have provided $4.3 million of funding for individuals seeking inpatient and outpatient treatment that people otherwise could not afford it.

== Partnerships ==
In early 2009, TWLOHA partnered with Kristin Brooks Hope Center to create IMAlive. IMAlive is the first ever online crisis counseling over instant messenger staffed by people trained and certified in crisis intervention. TWLOHA won $125,000 for IMAlive.

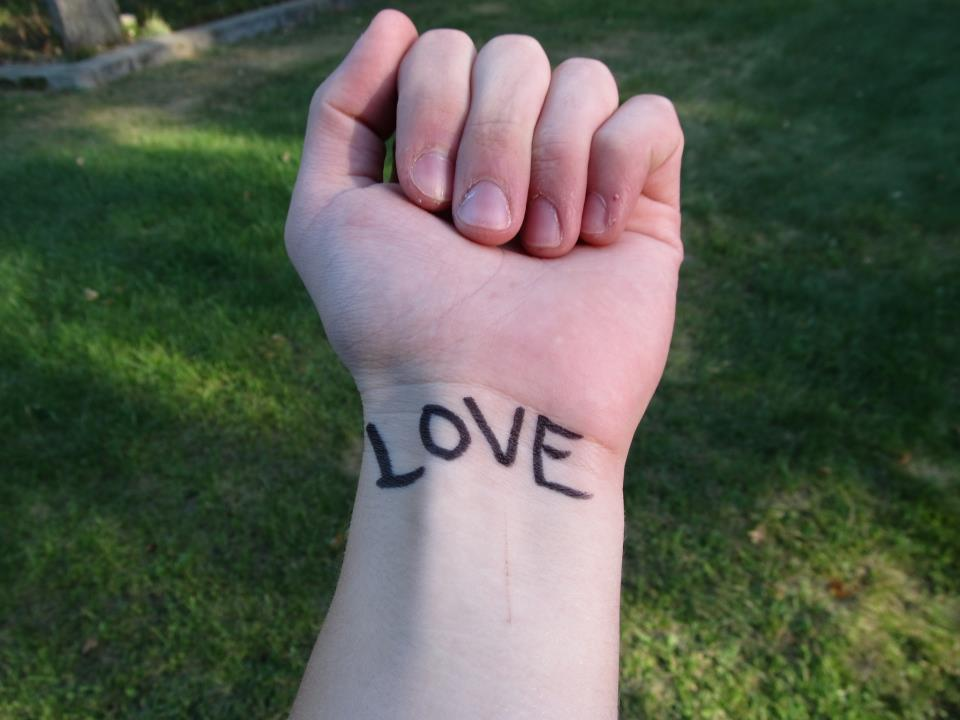
Example of individual participating in TWLOHA

== Awards and media coverage ==
On September 12, 2008, To Write Love on Her Arms was featured on the NBC Nightly News segment "Making a Difference".

In March 2010, TWLOHA won the Best Non-Profit Use of Twitter Award at the 2nd Annual Shorty Awards held in New York City.

On January 6, 2011, TWLOHA won the 2010 "Must-Follow Non-Profit" Award at the 4th Annual Mashable Awards.

== Film adaptations ==
A film dramatization (formerly titled Day One and Renee) of Renee Yohe's story that Tworkowski documented in his original story was released March 3, 2015, by Sony Pictures starring Kat Dennings as Yohe and Chad Michael Murray as Tworkowski.

In 2026, the organization honored its 20th anniversary with a documentary, To Write Love. The documentary commemorated those who have contributed to the company's history and message over the two previous decades.
