= To Write Love on Her Arms (film) =

2012 film by Nathan Frankowski

- DVD cover
- Directed by: Nathan Frankowski
- Screenplay by: Kate King Lynch
- Story by: Nathan Frankowski
- Produced by: David Nixon; David Blair McKenna; Kim Dawson
- Starring: Kat Dennings; Chad Michael Murray; Rupert Friend; Mark Saul; Juliana Harkavy; Corbin Bleu
- Cinematography: Stephen Campbell
- Edited by: Nathan Frankowski; Gordon Grinberg
- Music by: Robbie Bronnimann; Andy Hunter
- Production companies: Two Streets Entertainment; Birchwood Pictures; Noble Pictures; Valencia Motion Pictures
- Distributed by: Sony Pictures Home Entertainment
- Release dates: March 11, 2012 (Omaha Film Festival); March 3, 2015 (United States)
- Running time: 102 minutes
- Country: United States
- Language: English
- Budget: $3.4 million (est.)

To Write Love on Her Arms (also known as Day One; formerly Renee) is a 2012 American biographical drama film directed by Nathan Frankowski and starring Kat Dennings, Chad Michael Murray, Rupert Friend, Mark Saul, Juliana Harkavy, and Corbin Bleu. The film is based on the life of troubled teenager Renee Yohe and the founding of To Write Love on Her Arms by Jamie Tworkowski, after he and others helped Yohe to overcome her challenges enough to be able to enter rehab.

== Plot ==
It is 2006, and 19-year-old Renee Yohe has always loved fairy tales: the idea of a princess, a hero and a happily ever after. However, her life is that of a darker tale. As she battles with drug addiction, bipolar disorder, self-harm and other life issues, she receives love and support from numerous friends and new acquaintances, including Jamie Tworkowski and David McKenna. When Yohe is turned away from drug rehabilitation, with open wounds from self-cutting making her too great a treatment risk, McKenna takes her into his home for five days of detox, while Tworkowski posts an article on Myspace, titled "To Write Love on Her Arms" (in contrast to Yohe having written "Fuck Up" on her arm, with a razor blade), to fundraise the cost of rehab. Their efforts for Yohe are successful, and leads to Tworkowski founding the charity group To Write Love on Her Arms, offering similar support to other people who have depression, suicidal thoughts, addictions, or struggles with self-harm.

== Cast ==
- Kat Dennings as Renee Yohe
  - Lindsey Riesen as young Renee
  - Isabella Iannuzzi as little Renee
- Chad Michael Murray as Jamie Tworkowski
- Rupert Friend as David McKenna
- Juliana Harkavy as Jessie, Renee's best friend
  - Samantha Castro as young Jessie
- Corbin Bleu as Mackey
- Mark Saul as Dylan
  - Drayton Ball as young Dylan
- Rus Blackwell as Conrad Willard
- Sri Charan as Robert
- Brian Patrick Clarke as Tom Yohe
- West DeLarosa as Michael
- Kristi Engelmann as Amanda
- Whitney Goin as Dena Yohe
- Katherine Shepler as April Yohe
- Ryan Kirkland as Kirkland
- Michelle LaBret as Nikki
- J. LaRose as Echo
- Steve Robertson as label rep Stevo
- Brianna McCoy as Lacey
- William Peltz as Sean
- Juan Santos as Michael's father
- Michael Sapp as Trappy
- Chelsea Talmadge as Sarah

== Production ==
=== Pre-production ===
Josh Lujan Loveless, Bob Massey, Jamie Tworkowski, and Renee Yohe all served as story consultants for the film, collaborating with Frankowski for the script. The film is produced by David Blair McKenna, a long time friend of Yohe's who provided her his home as a place to get sober, as depicted in the film, so she could enter rehab.

=== Filming ===
Principal photography started on February 23, 2011, exactly five years after Yohe and Tworkowski first met. Filming went until March 29, 2011, and was shot entirely in Yohe's home town of Orlando, Florida. Various scenes were shot at Valencia Community College, The DAVE School, Full Sail University and Wall Street Plaza.

== Soundtrack ==
The film features a song Dead Man's Bones.

== Release ==
The film opened the 21st Florida Film Festival on April 13, 2012, playing at the Regal Winter Park Village.

=== Piracy ===
On November 27, 2014, the film was leaked onto several peer-to-peer file sharing websites four months ahead of its intended public release; it was one of five Sony Pictures films leaked, in a hack suspected to be conducted by North Korea.

== Awards and accolades ==
Year	Result	Award	Category	Recipients
2012	Won	Omaha Film Festival	Encore Award	Nathan Frankowski, Kim Dawson, David McKenna, Two Streets Entertainment
2012	Nominated	Visual Effects Society Awards	Outstanding Visual Effects in a Student Project	Syrena Edmonds, Zack Heimbegner, Brian Mullen, Nathaniel Skinner
2012	Won	Crystal Reel Awards	Best Actress	Kat Dennings
2012	Won	Crystal Reel Awards	Best Casting	Amy Severson
2012	Won	Crystal Reel Awards	Cinematography	Stephen Campbell
2012	Won	Crystal Reel Awards	Best Sound / Sound Mixing – Feature Film	Michael Orlowski, Dave Chmela
2012	Won	Crystal Reel Awards	Best Special Effects (CGI)	Lee Stringer
2012	Nominated	Crystal Reel Awards	Best Director	Nathan Frankowski
2012	Nominated	Crystal Reel Awards	Best Picture	Kim Dawson
