= Other People's Children (2015 film) =

- Film poster
- Directed by: Liz Hinlein
- Written by: Adrienne Harris
- Produced by: Edward Button; Adrienne Harris; Liz Hinlein; Diane Marshall-Green
- Starring: Diane Marshall-Green; Chad Michael Murray
- Cinematography: Edward Button
- Edited by: Eugenio Richer
- Music by: Mac Quayle
- Production company: OPC Film
- Distributed by: Golden Films
- Release date: December 31, 2015 (San Francisco)
- Running time: 84 minutes 85 minutes
- Country: United States
- Language: English

Other People's Children is a 2015 American romantic drama film directed by Liz Hinlein and starring Diane Marshall-Green and Chad Michael Murray. It is Hinlein's directorial debut.

== Cast ==
- Chad Michael Murray
- Diane Marshall-Green
- Michael Mosley
- Harrison Thomas
- Alexandra Breckenridge
- Alyssa Diaz
- Scott Patterson
- Kate Luyben
- Alex McKenna
- Emily Button
- Gattlin Griffith
- Alison Sudol

== Reception ==
On Rotten Tomatoes it received a 17% rating based on reviews from 6 critics.
