= Chad Michael Murray =

American actor (born 1981)

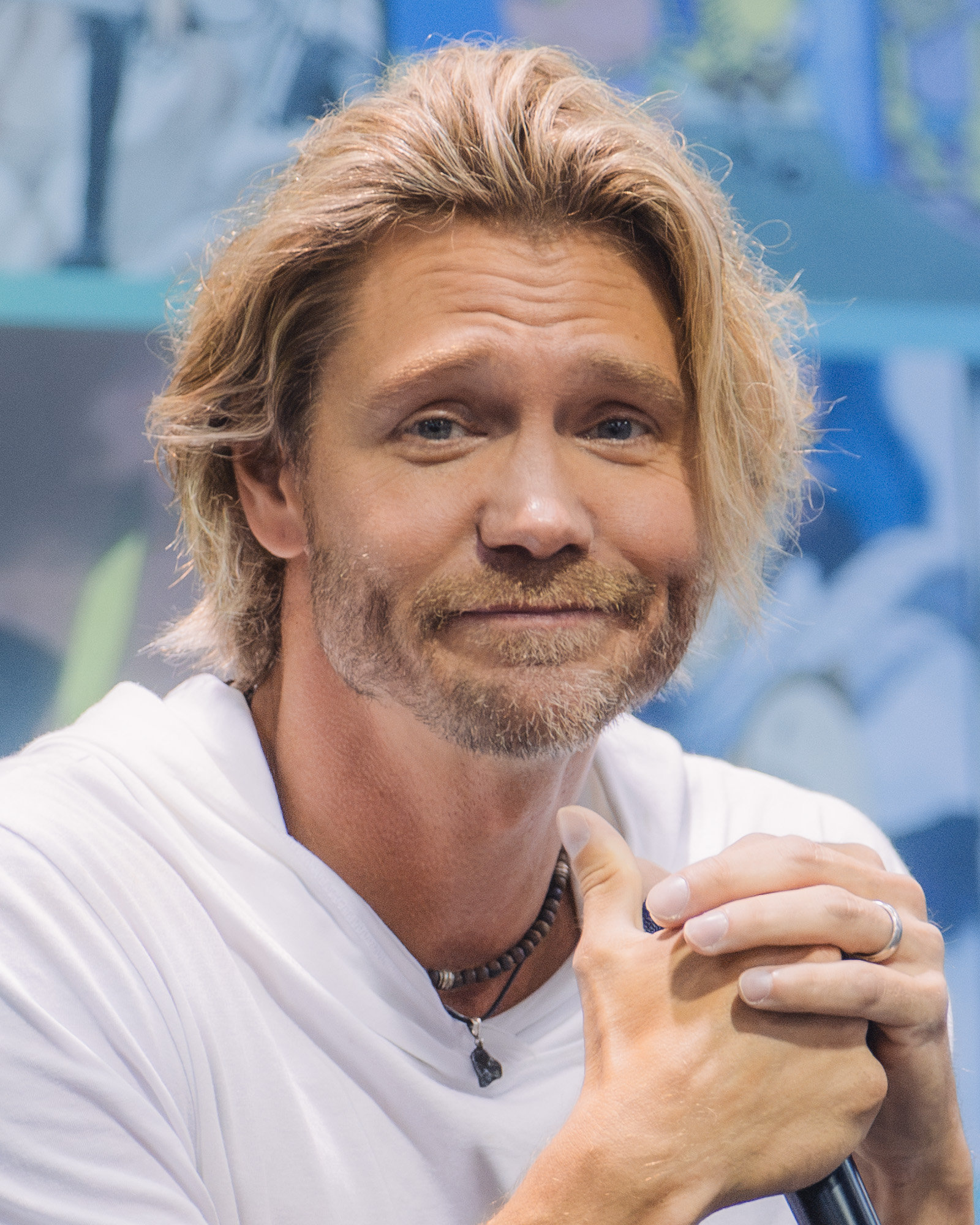
- Murray in 2026
- Born: August 24, 1981 (age 45); Buffalo, New York, U.S.
- Other name: Chad Murray
- Occupations: Actor; writer; model
- Years active: 2000–present
- Spouses: Sophia Bush (m. 2005; div. 2006) Sarah Roemer (m. 2015)
- Children: 3

Chad Michael Murray (born August 24, 1981) is an American actor, writer, and model. He starred as Lucas Scott in The WB/CW drama series One Tree Hill (2003–2009, 2012) and had recurring roles as Tristin DuGray on Gilmore Girls (2000–01), Charlie Todd on Dawson's Creek (2001–02), and Edgar Evernever on Riverdale (2019), all on the same network. He currently stars as Cal Jones in the CTV romantic drama series Sullivan's Crossing (2023–present).

Murray also starred in the film A Cinderella Story (2004) and had supporting roles in Freaky Friday (2003) and Fruitvale Station (2013). He went on to star in Chosen (2013–14), and Sun Records (2017), and appeared as main cast member in Marvel-ABC series Agent Carter (2015–16) and a recurring role in Fox's Star (2018–19). Murray has written a graphic novel with lead illustrator Danijel Žeželj titled Everlast (2011), and a novel co-authored with Heather Graham titled American Drifter (2017).

== Early life ==
Chad Michael Murray was born in Buffalo, New York, and was raised by a single father, Rex Murray, who worked as an air traffic controller. His mother left the family when Murray was 10 years old. He has five siblings, consisting of a younger sister, three younger full brothers, and a younger half-brother from his father's second marriage, and has two step-siblings, consisting of a step-sister and a step-brother.

Murray attended Clarence High School in Clarence, New York. He became a fan of literature and played football. As a teenager, he worked at the Dipson Theatres in Eastern Hills Mall. In his late teens, he broke his nose. This led to reports during his career that he had received a nose job. Murray clarified in a 2004 interview, "I got jumped in a Burger King when I was 18 and had my nose put on the other side of my face. It was three guys [...] The doctors didn't even bother running X-rays. They just reset it. But it wasn't a nose job—I hate the fact that people say it was a nose job!"

== Career ==
=== 1999–2002: Career beginnings ===
Murray won a scholarship to attend a modeling convention in Orlando, Florida, where he met an agent who encouraged him to go to Los Angeles for a week and see what happens. He subsequently got a manager and moved to Hollywood in 1999. Murray began modeling for brands such as Skechers, Tommy Hilfiger and Gucci.

In 2000, he guest starred as Dan on the MTV drama anthology series Undressed on the episode "Scared Stiffy" which aired on March 8 as part of its second season. Later that year, Murray was cast in the role of rich kid Tristin DuGray on The WB television series Gilmore Girls as a recurring character in the first season which debuted on October 5 and in an episode of the second season the next year. The series became a hit and Murray would go onto become a staple actor on the network for the rest of the decade. He ended his debut year on screen appearing on the November 16 episode of the CBS crime drama Diagnosis: Murder during its eighth season.

In 2001, he was cast in a television pilot for The WB, the family drama Murphy's Dozen, which revolved around 12 children and their parents in an Irish American family in New Jersey. The lead actress Kathy Baker signed on in March and the pilot was screened for the network in May but was not picked up for the fall season. Murray portrayed the role of teenage David Alexander in Christian Apocalyptic fiction film Megiddo: The Omega Code 2 which released on September 7. Murray was cast in the role of womanizer Charlie Todd on The WB's hit television series Dawson's Creek as a recurring character in the fifth season which premiered on October 10. He next appeared on an episode of CSI: Crime Scene Investigation which aired on CBS on October 3, 2002, during its third season.

=== 2003–2010: Success with One Tree Hill and mainstream films ===
In 2003, Murray began the year appearing in the family drama television film A Long Way Home, also known as Aftermath, playing the role of Sean in a family trying to reconcile following domestic sexual abuse. He next played the lead role of Luke Hartman on The WB's western television film The Lone Ranger which aired on February 26 and served as a backdoor pilot for a potential series run. Murray was cast in the role of love-interest Jake in the Walt Disney Pictures comedy film Freaky Friday, starring Lindsay Lohan and Jamie Lee Curtis, which released in theaters on August 6. It was Disney's third adaptation of the 1972 children's novel of the same name authored by Mary Rodgers. The film was a critical and a major box office success, earning roughly $161 million worldwide. He also recorded a version of ...Baby One More Time which was featured on the soundtrack to the movie.

Later that year, he was cast in the lead role of Lucas Scott on The WB series One Tree Hill which debuted on September 23, 2003. The first-season finale garnered 4.50 million viewers. The series was one of The WB's most successful programs the year it began and continued with impressive ratings after the network merged with rival UPN to become The CW in 2006. The series earned Murray six Teen Choice Award nominations over the years, including winning Choice TV – Breakout Actor in August 2004 and Choice TV Actor – Drama in August 2008. Stemming from the series' popularity, he and his One Tree Hill co-stars became official endorsers for MasterCard, K-Mart, Cingular Wireless and the Chevy Cobalt.

In 2004, Murray starred as Austin Ames in the romantic comedy film A Cinderella Story alongside Hilary Duff which released in July 16. The film was a box office success, earning $70.1 million worldwide, but was panned by critics. The film earned Murray the award for Choice Movie – Breakout Actor in August 2004 and several more nominations at the 2005 Teen Choice Awards. He is the first person to win their awards for Breakout Actor in both the TV and Movie categories in the same year. Murray was listed as one of "TV's Sexiest Guys" by People magazine in November 2004.

He next co-starred as Nick Jones in the horror film House of Wax which released theatrically on May 6, 2005. The film earned Murray two more Teen Choice Award nominations, including winning Choice Movie Actor – Action/Thriller in August 2005. Murray was listed as one of "Fall TV's Sexiest Guys" by People magazine in September 2005, and was the cover model for Teen People magazine that same month. He played the role of Private Jordan Owens in the Iraq War drama film Home of the Brave, alongside Samuel L. Jackson, Jessica Biel and 50 Cent, which test released in theaters on December 6, 2006, before a limited theatrical release on April 17, 2007.

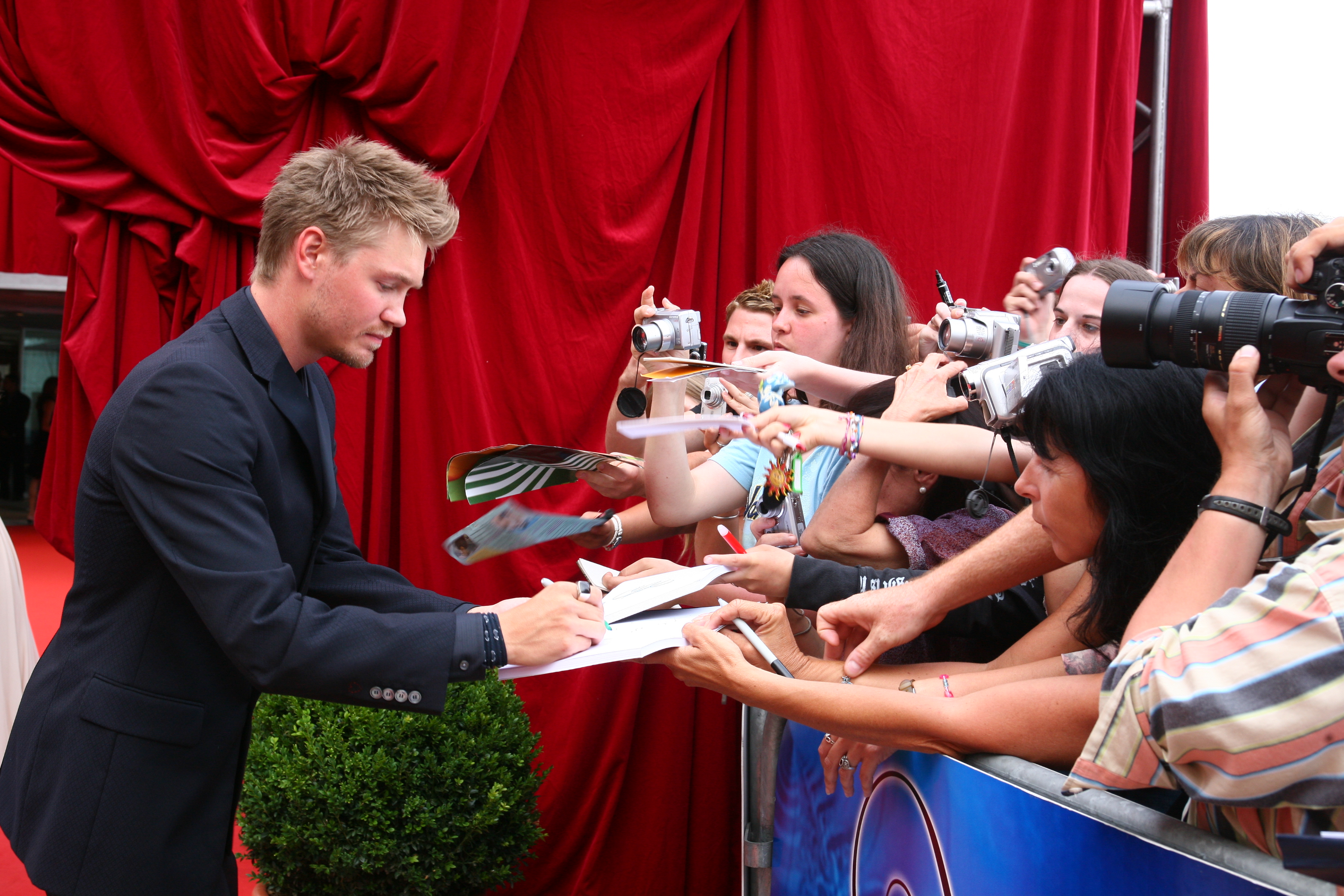
Murray at the 2007 Monte-Carlo Television Festival.

Murray was listed at #12 on AOL Television's list of "TV's 50 Hottest Hunks Ever" on November 4, 2008. In May 2009, it was reported that Murray would not be returning to One Tree Hill for its seventh season. A video of Murray was recorded in which he was telling fans that they did not want him back because they wanted to save money. However, creator Mark Schwahn said in an interview that Murray had been offered "great things" to return to the show.

In 2010, Murray played the love-interest of Alicia Keys in her music video for "Un-Thinkable (I'm Ready)" which premiered on BET's 106 & Park on May 12. The video depicts the burgeoning romance of a young interracial couple reimagined across different eras, from the 1950s through the 2000s. It won Outstanding Music Video at the 42nd NAACP Image Awards in March 2011. Murray played the role of Ethan McAllister in the drama television film Lies in Plain Sight which aired on Lifetime on October 3, 2010. He played the love-interest Patrick Kerns in the television film Christmas Cupid, alongside Christina Milan and Ashley Benson, which premiered on ABC Family on December 12.

=== 2011–2015: Chosen, Agent Carter and independent films ===
On August 29, 2011, The CW announced that Murray would return for a guest appearance as Lucas Scott in the final season of One Tree Hill. The episode aired on February 22, 2012, as part of the concluding ninth season. He then played the male lead Jamie Tworkowski in the biographical drama film To Write Love on Her Arms which premiered on March 11, 2012, at the Omaha Film Festival where it won the Encore Award. The film is based on the true story of Tworkowski's founding of the Florida-based non-profit organization of the same name helping those struggling with addiction, mental illness and self-injury, and received a limited theatrical release on March 3, 2015.

He next played the role of Thatcher in the short film The Carrier which premiered on April 27, 2012, at the USA Film Festival. On March 12, it was reported that he was cast to play the male lead Spider Elliot in a television pilot for ABC, Scruples, with Claire Forlani playing the female lead Billy Orsini and with Natalie Portman serving as an executive producer. The potential series, adapted from Judith Krantz's pioneering 1979 debut bonkbuster novel of the same name, was not picked up by the network. Murray next starred as Dylan in the Funny or Die short First Kiss alongside Rachael Leigh Cook which released on September 11.

In 2013, Murray played the role of Officer Ingram in the biographical drama film Fruitvale Station, which chronicles the last day of Oscar Grant, portrayed by Michael B. Jordan, who was shot and killed by a BART Police officer in Oakland, California. The film premiered at the 2013 Sundance Film Festival on January 19 before releasing theatrically on July 12, becoming a critical and box office success, earning $17.4 million from a budget of under a million. Murray next played male lead Andy Wyrick in the horror film The Haunting in Connecticut 2: Ghosts of Georgia which released on February 1. The film, inspired by the true events surrounding the Wyrick family, is Murray's first role playing a father. He guest starred as Officer Dave Mendoza in the crime drama series Southland on two episodes during its concluding fifth season which premiered on TNT on February 13. It marked his on-screen union with its co-star Ben McKenzie (Officer Ben Sherman), who had played Ryan Atwood on popular teen drama The O.C. that debuted the same year as OTH.

On October 9, 2013, it was reported that Murray was cast to join action-thriller series Chosen on Crackle. He played the lead role of Jacob Orr in the second season which premiered on December 12 that year and in the third season which released on April 15, 2014. Murray played the role of Jay in comedy film Cavemen which premiered on October 26 at the 2013 Austin Film Festival before a limited theatrical release on February 7, 2014. He played the role of Tanner McCoy in comedy film A Madea Christmas which released theatrically on December 13, 2013. Murray next co-starred in the apocalyptic thriller film Left Behind, playing the role of Cameron "Buck" Williams, alongside Nicolas Cage and Jordin Sparks. The film, based on the novel series of the same name authored by Jerry B. Jenkins and Tim LaHaye, was released on October 3, 2014.

On August 29, 2014, it was announced that Murray was cast in the role of Agent Jack Thompson in the ABC spy thriller series Agent Carter, part of the Marvel Cinematic Universe. The first season premiered on January 6, 2015, and the second season premiered on January 19, 2016.

Later in 2015, he guest starred on the Fox black comedy series Scream Queens on a November 24 episode during its first season, playing Chad Radwell's older brother Brad. Murray starred as the male lead "P.K." in the romantic drama film Other People's Children which premiered on August 15 at the Columbia Gorge International Film Festival where it won the Best of Festival award. It received a limited theatrical release on December 25. In order to portray a homeless heroin addict, Murray lost 25 lbs (11.34 kg) of weight, stating that he exercised for three and a half weeks, burning 3,000 calories a day while eating only 1,400 to 1,600 calories a day from a diet consisting of "oatmeal, egg whites, salads, chicken [and] tuna."

=== 2016–2022: Sun Records, Star and Fortress ===
Murray starred as Henry in the western film Outlaws and Angels which premiered on January 25 at the 2016 Sundance Film Festival, before a limited theatrical release on July 15. On March 14, 2016, it was reported that Murray was cast to star as Sam Phillips in the CMT biographical drama series Million Dollar Quartet. On December 14, the eight-episode miniseries was retitled Sun Records, before premiering on February 23, 2017.

In 2018, he played the male lead Brett Beauchamps in the drama television film The Beach House, alongside Minka Kelly and Andie MacDowell, which premiered on the Hallmark Channel on April 28. He next played the male lead Jack in horror film Camp Cold Brook which premiered on August 25 at the HorrorHound Film Festival, before a limited theatrical release on February 14, 2020. On August 27, 2018, it was reported that Murray was cast in a recurring role as Xander McPherson, the toxic love-interest of Cassie Brown as played by Brandy Norwood, in the third season of the musical drama Star which premiered on Fox on September 26.

On February 8, 2019, it was reported that Murray was cast in a recurring role as Edgar Evernever in the third season of The CW drama Riverdale. He starred as Luke Miller on television film Write Before Christmas alongside Torrey DeVitto on Hallmark Channel on November 17.

In 2020, Murray starred as Brett Hollister in the television film Love in Winterland which premiered on the Hallmark Channel on January 11. He next starred as Paul Barnett in the film Too Close for Christmas which received a limited theatrical release on November 13, before premiering on Lifetime on December 4. The film marks the first in a series of on-screen collaborations with Jessica Lowndes.

In 2021, he starred as Joel Sheehan in the film Colors of Love which received a limited theatrical release on February 4, before premiering on GAC Family on October 23 under the title An Autumn Romance as its first original movie. The film, based on the 2014 novel Tycoon's Kiss authored by Jane Porter, is the second with Murray and Lowndes together. He starred as Brody Bradshaw in the television film Sand Dollar Cove which premiered on the Hallmark Channel on June 26. He starred as Gabe on the television film Angel Falls Christmas which premiered on GAC Family on November 26, marking the third film between Murray and Lowndes. He starred as Kevin Vaughn on the television film Toying with the Holidays which premiered on Lifetime on December 18. He played Steve in hotel booking website Hotels.com's commercial.

=== 2023–present: Return to television with Sullivan's Crossing ===
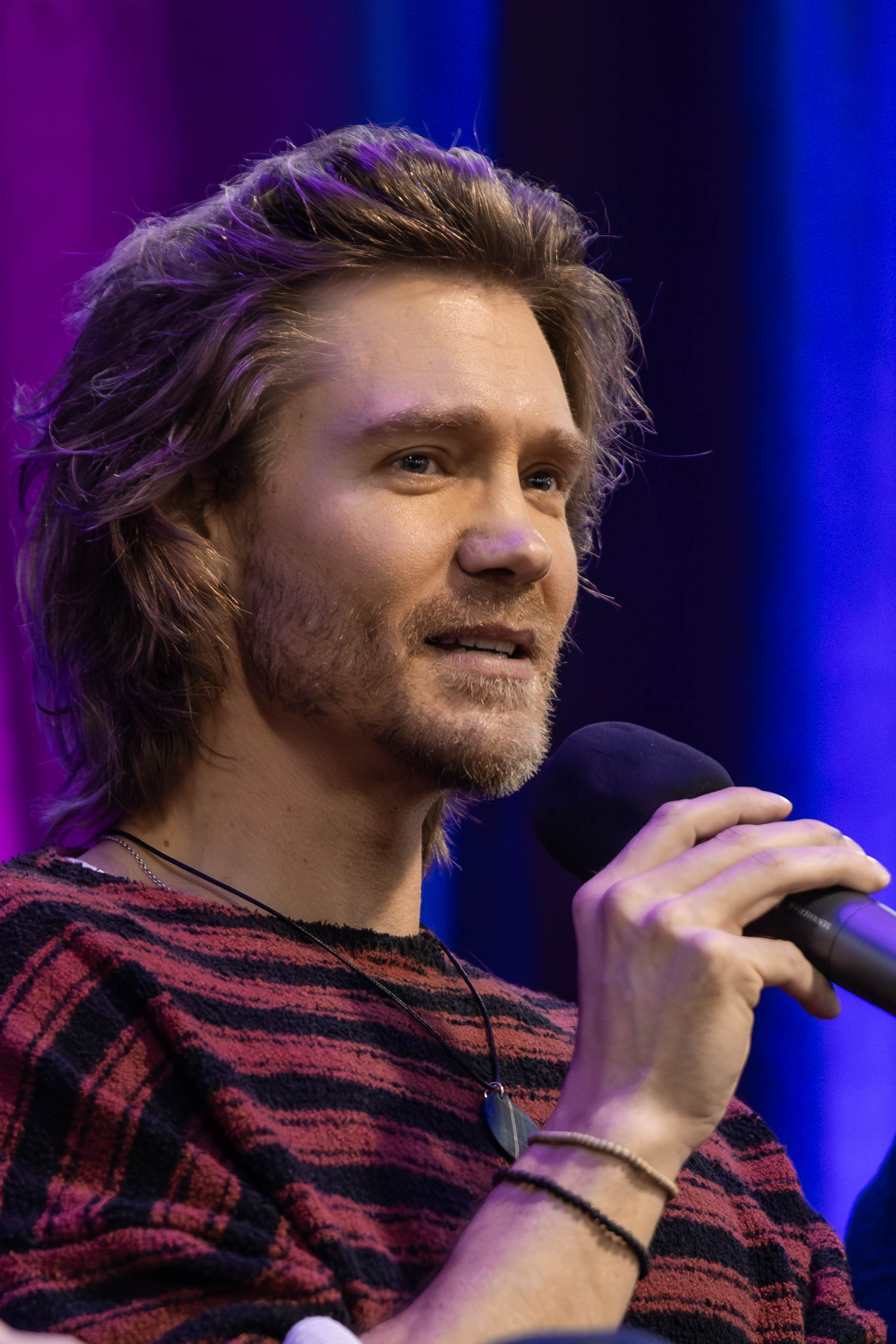
Murray in 2025

On June 1, 2022, it was announced that Murray was cast as the male lead Cal Jones on the drama series Sullivan's Crossing alongside Morgan Kohan as the female lead Maggie Sullivan and Scott Patterson as her father Sully Sullivan. The Canadian series, based on the American novel series of the same name authored by Robyn Carr, premiered on CTV on March 19, 2023. The second season premiered April 14, 2024, and in June 2024, it was announced that the show had been renewed for a third season.

He played Lucas, Brooke Shields' character's love interest in the Netflix original film Mother of the Bride (2024), released on May 9, 2024. It reached Netflix's Top 10 most watched lists in numerous countries. On July 18, 2024, Disney published a photo of Murray as Jake on set of Freaky Friday's sequel film called Freakier Friday (2025).

== Writing career ==
Murray authored a graphic novel, Everlast, which released in November 2011. In November 2017, he released American Drifter: An Exhilarating Tale of Love and Murder, which he co-authored with novelist Heather Graham. The romantic thriller was inspired by a dream.

== Personal life ==
In May 2004, Murray became engaged to his One Tree Hill co-star Sophia Bush, and they married on April 16, 2005, in Santa Monica, California. They announced their separation in September 2005. In February 2006, Bush filed for an annulment, citing fraud. Bush's petition was denied, and instead the pair were granted a divorce in December 2006.

On April 6, 2006, it was reported that Murray was engaged to Kenzie Dalton, an actress and Miss North Carolina Teen USA 2006 runner-up; at the time, he was 24 and she was 18. The day before, Murray escorted Dalton to the North Carolina Azalea Festival Queen's Welcoming Ceremony, where Dalton served as part of the "Princess' court" and wore her engagement ring. The two first met in August 2005 when Dalton appeared as an extra on One Tree Hill on the sixth episode during its third season. On September 20, 2013, it was reported that they had ended their engagement of nearly seven and a half years, with Murray's representative telling media that they had "quietly parted ways earlier in the year."

In September 2013, Murray began dating his Left Behind co-star, Australian actress Nicky Whelan. The two were first pictured together leaving the Chateau Marmont on September 19. The next month, Murray joined Whelan on the second season of Chosen. The couple separated in April 2014 after roughly eight months of dating.

In 2014, Murray began dating his Chosen co-star Sarah Roemer. In January 2015, it was announced that he and Roemer had married, and were expecting their first child. They have three children: a son, born in 2015, and two daughters, born in 2017 and 2023.

Murray is a lifelong fan of the Buffalo Bills National Football League team, and in October 2024, signed on to executive produce a docuseries alongside former Bills wide receiver and pro football hall of famer Andre Reed, titled "Just One Before I Die," about the Buffalo Bills fanbase. The five-episode series will premiere on Tubi October 21, 2026.

== Filmography ==
=== Film ===
Year	Title	Role	Notes
2001	Megiddo: The Omega Code 2	Young David Alexander	
2003	Freaky Friday	Jake Austin	
2004	A Cinderella Story	Austin Ames	
2005	House of Wax	Nick Jones	
2006	Home of the Brave	Jordan Owens	
2012	To Write Love on Her Arms	Jamie Tworkowski	
2012	The Carrier	Thatcher	Short film
2012	First Kiss	Himself	Short film
2013	The Haunting in Connecticut 2: Ghosts of Georgia	Andy Wyrick	
2013	Fruitvale Station	Officer Ingram	
2013	Cavemen	Jay	
2013	A Madea Christmas	Tanner McCoy	
2014	Left Behind	Cameron "Buck" Williams	
2015	Other People's Children	P.K.	Also executive producer
2016	Outlaws and Angels	Henry	
2018	Camp Cold Brook	Jack	
2019	Max Winslow and the House of Secrets	Atticus Virtue	
2020	Survive the Night	Rich Clark	
2020	Too Close for Christmas	Paul Barnett	Also executive producer
2021	Colors of Love	Joel Sheehan	
2021	Ted Bundy: American Boogeyman	Ted Bundy	
2021	Survive the Game	Eric	
2021	Fortress	Frederick Balzary	
2022	Fortress: Sniper's Eye	Frederick Balzary	
2023	Christmas on Windmill Way	Brady Schaltz	
2024	Mother of the Bride	Lucas	
2024	The Merry Gentlemen	Luke	
2025	Freakier Friday	Jake Austin	
2025	Bad Men Must Bleed	Jacob Wallace	
2025	Joy to the World	Max	

=== Television ===
Year	Title	Role	Notes
2000	Undressed	Dan	Episode "Scared Stiffy"
2000	Diagnosis: Murder	Ray Santucci	Episode: "The Cradle Will Rock"
2000–01	Gilmore Girls	Tristin DuGray	Recurring role (season 1), guest role (season 2), 11 episodes
2001	Murphy's Dozen	Kevin Murphy	Unaired television pilot (The WB)
2001–02	Dawson's Creek	Charlie Todd	Recurring role (season 5), 12 episodes
2002	CSI: Crime Scene Investigation	Tom Haviland	Episode: "The Accused Is Entitled"
2003	A Long Way Home	Sean	AKA: Aftermath; Television film (CBS)
2003	The Lone Ranger	Luke Hartman / Lone Ranger	Television film (The WB); Pilot for a reboot television series
2003–09, 2012	One Tree Hill	Lucas Scott	Main role (seasons 1–6), Guest role (season 9); Director (1 episode), Writer (1 episode) —131 episodes
2010	Lies in Plain Sight	Ethan McAllister	Television film (Lifetime Movie Network)
2010	Christmas Cupid	Patrick Kerns	Television film (ABC Family)
2012	Scruples	Spider Elliott	Unaired television pilot (ABC)
2013	Southland	Dave Mendoza	Guest role (season 5); 2 episodes
2013–14	Chosen	Jacob Orr	Main role (seasons 2–3), 12 episodes
2015	Texas Rising	Mirabeau Lamar	Television miniseries; 5 episodes
2015	Scream Queens	Brad Radwell	Episode: "Thanksgiving"
2015–16	Agent Carter	Jack Thompson	Main role; 14 episodes
2017	Sun Records	Sam Phillips	Main role; 8 episodes
2018	The Beach House	Brett Beauchamps	Television film (Hallmark Channel)
2018–19	Star	Xander McPherson	Recurring role (season 3); 8 episodes
2018	Road to Christmas	Danny Wise	Television film (Hallmark Channel)
2019	Riverdale	Edgar Evernever	Recurring role (season 3), guest (season 4); 9 episodes
2019	Write Before Christmas	Luke Miller	Television films (Hallmark Channel)
2020	Love in Winterland	Brett Hollister	Television films (Hallmark Channel)
2021	Sand Dollar Cove	Brody Bradshaw	Television films (Hallmark Channel)
2021	Toying with the Holidays	Kevin Vaughn	Television film (Lifetime); also exec. producer
2021	Angel Falls Christmas	Gabriel	Television film (GAC Family); also exec. producer
2023	Christmas on Windmill Way	Brady Schaltz	Television film (GAC Family)
2023–present	Sullivan's Crossing	Cal Jones	Main role; 40 episodes
2026	Big City Greens	Hot Potato (voice)	Episode: "The Farmies"

=== Music videos ===
Year	Title	Artist	Role
2010	"Un-Thinkable (I'm Ready)"	Alicia Keys	Love interest
2018	"All I Need"	Brandy	Love interest
2019	"Her World or Mine"	Michael Ray	Father

=== Commercials ===
Year	Title	Brand	Role	Ref.
2016	"Made in America: More American Jobs"	Walmart	Manufacturing worker	
2021	"Breakup"	Hotels.com	Steve	

== Bibliography ==
- Everlast (2011)
- American Drifter: An Exhilarating Tale of Love and Murder (2017), co-authored with Heather Graham

== Awards and nominations ==
Year	Award	Category	Work	Result
2004	Teen Choice Awards	Choice TV – Breakout Actor	One Tree Hill	Won
2004	Teen Choice Awards	Choice TV Actor – Drama	One Tree Hill	Nominated
2004	Teen Choice Awards	Choice Movie – Breakout Actor	A Cinderella Story	Won
2005	Teen Choice Awards	Choice Movie Actor – Action/Thriller	House of Wax	Won
2005	Teen Choice Awards	Choice Movie – Rumble (with Elisha Cuthbert and Brian Van Holt)	House of Wax	Nominated
2005	Teen Choice Awards	Choice Movie – Chemistry (with Hilary Duff)	A Cinderella Story	Nominated
2005	Teen Choice Awards	Choice Movie – Liplock (with Hilary Duff)	A Cinderella Story	Nominated
2005	Teen Choice Awards	Choice Movie – Love Scene (with Hilary Duff)	A Cinderella Story	Nominated
2005	Teen Choice Awards	Choice TV Actor – Drama	One Tree Hill	Nominated
2005	Teen Choice Awards	Choice TV: Chemistry (with James Lafferty)	One Tree Hill	Nominated
2006	Teen Choice Awards	Choice TV Actor – Drama	One Tree Hill	Nominated
2006	Prism Award	Best Performance in a Drama Series Storyline	One Tree Hill	Nominated
2008	Teen Choice Awards	Choice TV Actor – Drama	One Tree Hill	Won
2019	Burbank International Film Festival	Best Actor	Max Winslow and the House of Secrets	Nominated
