= Scott Patterson =

American actor and former baseball player (born 1958)

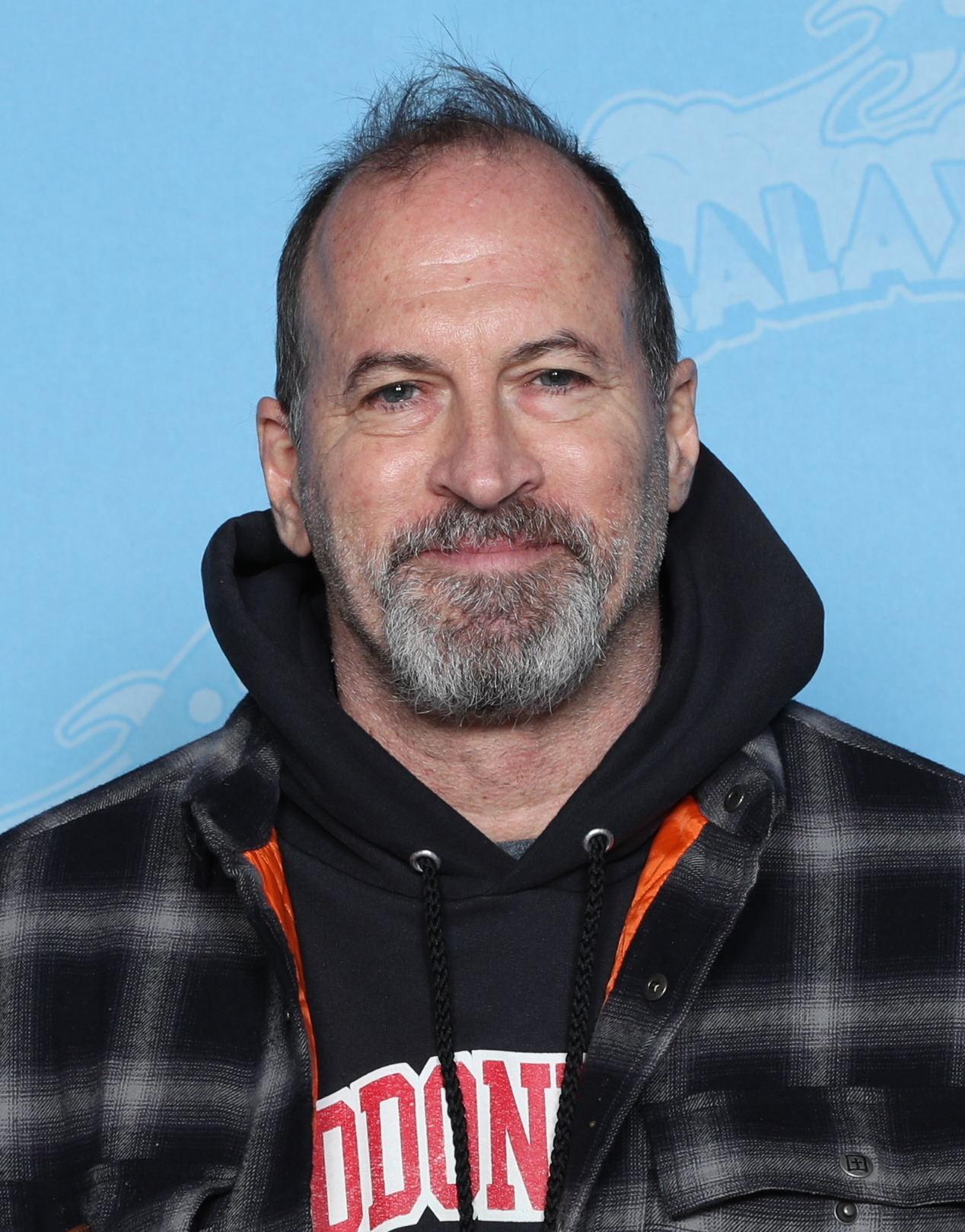
- Patterson at GalaxyCon Richmond in 2020
- Born: September 11, 1958 (age 68); Philadelphia, Pennsylvania, U.S.
- Occupations: Baseball player (1980–1986); Actor (1992–present)
- Spouse: Kristine Saryan (m. 2014)
- Children: 1

Scott Patterson (born September 11, 1958) is an American actor and former baseball player. After making his film debut in Intent to Kill (1992), Patterson had his breakout with a main role as Luke Danes on the WB comedy-drama television series Gilmore Girls (2000–2007). He reprised his role on the Netflix miniseries Gilmore Girls: A Year in the Life (2016).

After Gilmore Girls, Patterson had a main role as Gary Tolchuck on the CW sitcom Aliens in America (2007–2008) and had a starring role as Agent Peter Strahm in the horror films Saw IV (2007) and Saw V (2008).

In the 2010s, Patterson had a main role as Michael Buchanan on the NBC television series The Event (2010–2011) and voiced James Gordon and Jack the Ripper in the animated superhero film Batman: Gotham by Gaslight (2018). Since 2023, he has had a main role as Harry "Sully" Sullivan on the CTV television series Sullivan's Crossing.

== Early life ==
Patterson was born on September 11, 1958, in Philadelphia, Pennsylvania, and raised in Haddonfield, New Jersey. He attended Haddonfield Memorial High School, graduating in 1977, before attending Rutgers University, where he pursued a degree in comparative literature, eventually leaving college to play baseball. He was exposed to the teachings of Paul Newman, Arthur Penn, and Frank Corsaro at the Actors Studio, where he also participated in the Producer's Unit Penn chaired.

== Baseball career ==
Scott Patterson
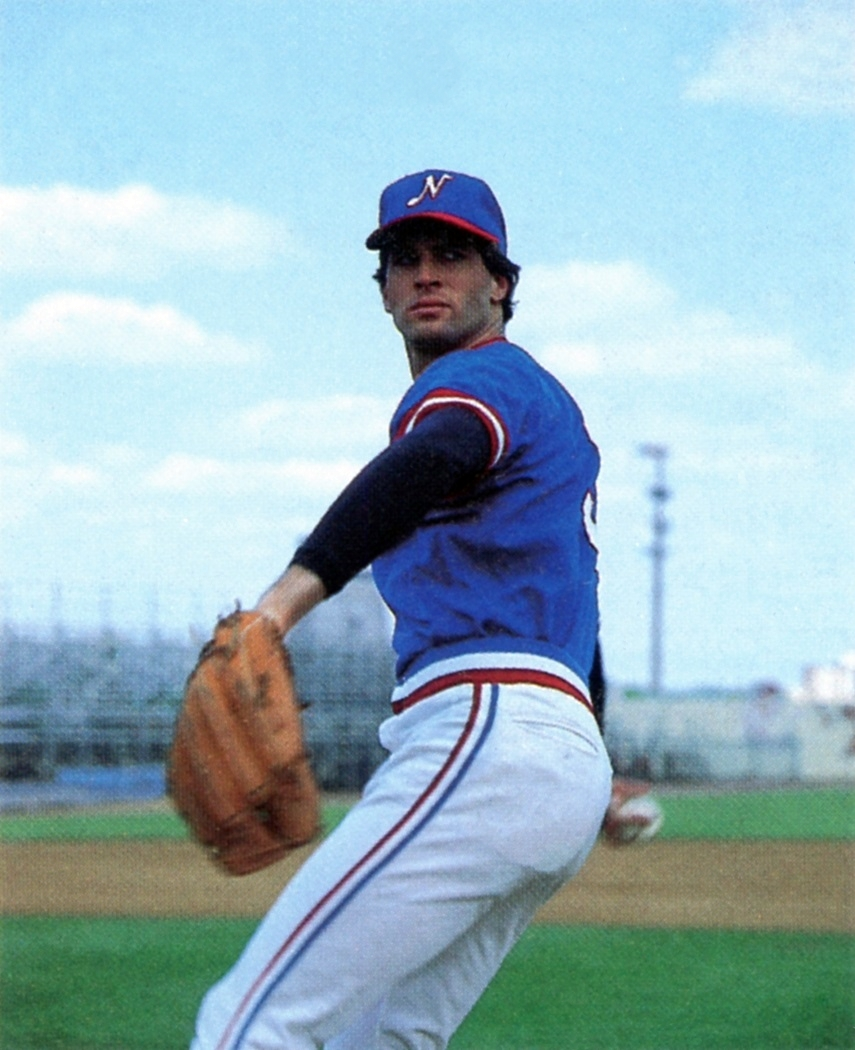
- Patterson with the Nashville Sounds in 1983
- Pitcher
- Bats: Right Throws: Right

Patterson spent seven years, from 1980 to 1986, as a professional pitcher in minor league baseball, topping out at the Triple-A level, the highest before the major leagues. He played in two major-league farm systems for seven different minor-league teams and was selected to four all-star teams (two with Atlanta and two with the New York Yankees). Patterson was initially selected by the Atlanta Braves in the first round (12th overall) of the 1980 Major League Baseball secondary draft (an event distinct from the amateur draft). He played his first pro season with their Class A Anderson Braves in 1980. In 1981 Patterson won 13 consecutive games as a starting pitcher between Class A Durham and Double-A Savannah to set a Braves record for most consecutive wins to start a season. He was named the Braves Minor League Pitcher of the Month twice.

Patterson was traded from the Braves to the New York Yankees for Bob Watson on April 23, 1982, and was placed on the Yankees Major League roster in 1983. Patterson was named as an All-Star both with the Yankees' Double-A Albany-Colonie Yankees and Triple-A Columbus Clippers in 1986. In 1985 he was selected by the Texas Rangers in the Rule 5 draft but subsequently returned to the Yankees. While in the Yankees organization Patterson was named their minor league Pitcher of the Month once, and Pitcher of the Week three times. Patterson also pitched in the Puerto Rican Winter League with the Lobos de Arecibo in 1984–85, and the Dominican Professional Baseball League with Santo Domingo in 1985–86. Patterson signed a minor league contract with the Los Angeles Dodgers affiliate, the Albuquerque Dukes, in late 1986 but never played at the major league level.

== Acting career ==
Patterson completed filming the leading role in the feature film Her Best Move, directed by Norm Hunter and co-starring Lisa Darr. He also appeared on the big screen in Little Big League, with Jason Robards, and in Three Wishes, with Patrick Swayze and Mary Elizabeth Mastrantonio. He also appeared in Boys of Abu Ghraib and Other People's Children.

On television, he has landed romantic roles; his most notable role, which he played for seven years on the television show Gilmore Girls, is Luke Danes, the backwards baseball cap-wearing on-again, off-again love interest of the show's protagonist, Lorelai Gilmore, played by Lauren Graham. On Seinfeld, Patterson's character was deemed "spongeworthy" by Elaine (Julia Louis-Dreyfus). In the "Das Boob" episode of Will & Grace, his character had a profound effect on Grace (Debra Messing). Patterson also played the love interests of Jennifer Grey in It's Like, You Know and Sharon Lawrence's character in Fired Up. He appeared on Arli$$ and Get Real.

Patterson's recent projects include a role in Aliens in America and voicing the character of King Faraday in the 2004 animated series Justice League Unlimited, from Warner Bros. Animation. He starred as Agent Strahm in two iterations of the Saw franchise, Saw IV and Saw V.

He starred as Michael Buchanan in the NBC drama series The Event, which premiered on September 20, 2010. His character was killed off in episode 18.

In 2016, Patterson reprised his role as Luke Danes for the revival miniseries Gilmore Girls: A Year in the Life, which streamed on Netflix on November 25, 2016, and consisted of four 90-minute episodes featuring most of the original cast.

Since 2023, Patterson has played the title role of Harry 'Sully' Sullivan on the Canadian television series Sullivan's Crossing.

== Filmography ==
=== Film ===
List of films and roles
Year	Title	Role	Notes
1992	Intent to Kill	Al	
1994	Little Big League	Mike McGrevey	
1995	A Boy Called Hate	CHP Officer	
1995	Three Wishes	Scott's Father	
2000	Highway 395	Mark Bradley	
2007	Her Best Move	Gil Davis	
2007	Saw IV	Agent Peter Strahm	
2008	Saw V	Agent Peter Strahm	
2012	The Frankenstein Brothers	George Martin	also known as A Beer Tale
2013	Meth Head	Hank	
2014	Boys of Abu Ghraib	Captain Hayes	
2015	Other People's Children	Frank Tassler	
2016	Outlaw		Producer; credited as Scott Gordon Patterson
2017	Yellow Fever	John Smart	
2017	Ape	Bill	Short film
2018	Batman: Gotham by Gaslight	James Gordon / Jack the Ripper	Voice role
2018	Con Man	Older Mikey	

=== Television ===
List of television appearances and roles
Year	Title	Role	Notes
1993	The Return of Ironside	Gillette	Television film
1994	Alien Nation: Dark Horizon	Ahpossno	Television film
1995	Seinfeld	Billy	Episode: "The Sponge"
1996	Them	Simon Trent	Television film
1996	Silk Stalkings	Chick Chandler	Episode: "Pre-Judgement Day"
1997	Arliss	Dan Manville	Episode: "The Real Thing"
1997–1998	Fired Up	Mickey	2 episodes
1998	Rhapsody in Bloom	Phil	Television film
1998	Vengeance Unlimited	Det. Tom Swain	2 episodes
1999	It's Like, You Know...	Ted	Episode: "The Client"
1999	Get Real	Jacob Perryhill	Episode: "Performance Anxiety"
1999	Will & Grace	Don Gregorio	Episode: "Das Boob"
2000–2007	Gilmore Girls	Luke Danes	Main role
2002	Hollywood Squares	Himself	Panelist; 5 episodes
2002–2003	Pyramid	Himself	Celebrity contestant; 3 episodes
2005	Justice League Unlimited	Agent King Faraday	Voice role; 3 episodes
2007	Up Close with Carrie Keagan	Himself	Episode: "25 October 2007"
2007–2008	Aliens in America	Gary Tolchuck	Main role
2010	90210	Finnigan "Finn" Court	3 episodes
2010	Concrete Canyons	Ben Sloane	Television film
2010–2011	The Event	Michael Buchanan	Main role
2011	CSI: Miami	Brendon Dwyer	Episode: "Killer Regrets"
2011	Celebrity Ghost Stories	Himself	Episode: "Scott Patterson/Maria Conchita Alonso/Christopher Atkins"
2012	Love at the Christmas Table	Tom Patton	Television film
2015	Kidnapped: The Hannah Anderson Story	James DiMaggio	Television film
2016	Gilmore Girls: A Year in the Life	Luke Danes	Miniseries
2018	Home & Family	Himself	Episode: "Scott Patterson/Tate Ellington/Alexandra Catalano"
2023–2025	Sullivan's Crossing	Sully Sullivan	Series regular; Seasons 1-3
